= NWA Wrestling Legends Hall of Heroes =

Professional wrestling hall of fame

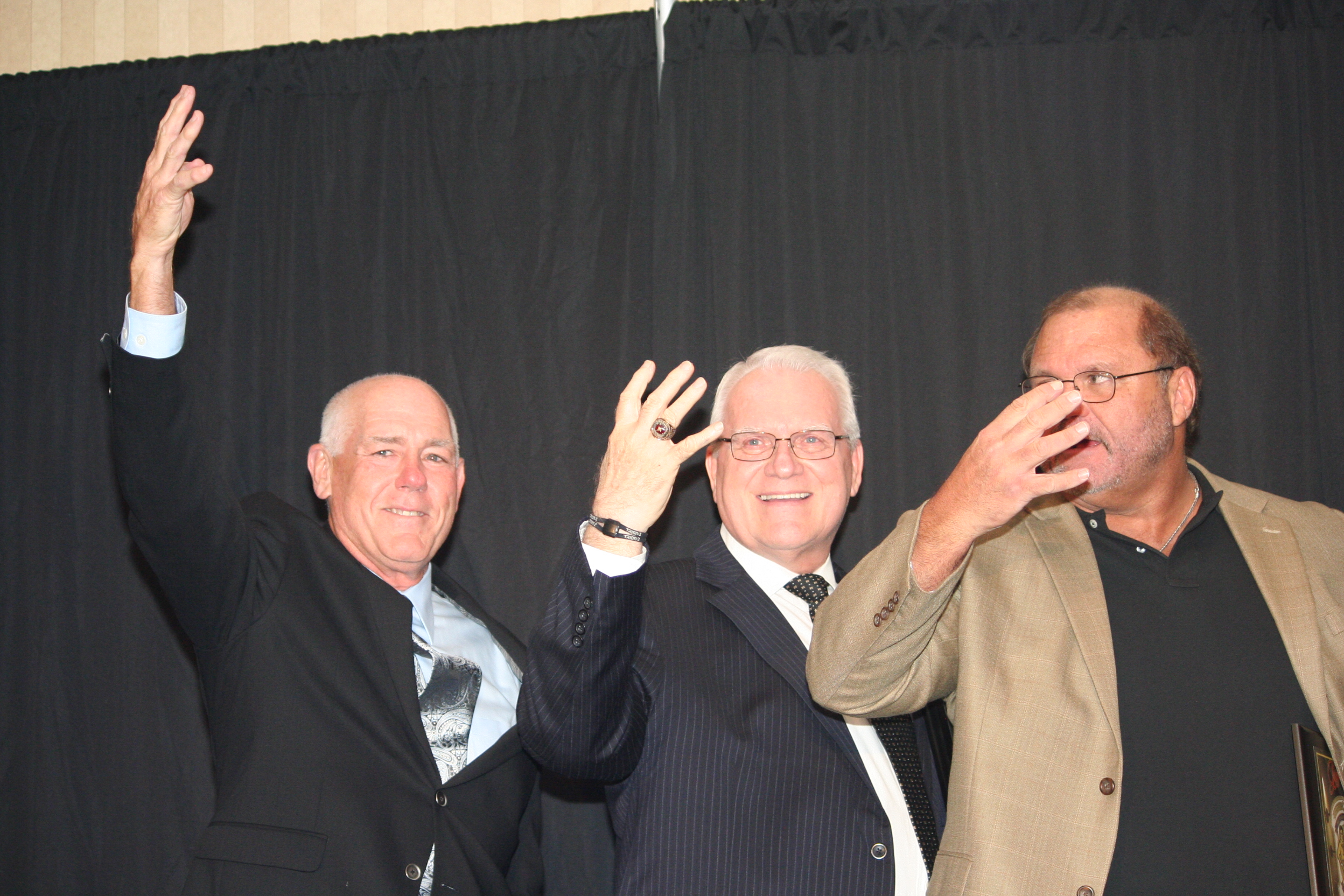
Tully Blanchard, J. J. Dillon and Arn Anderson display the Four Horsemen sign following their 2014 induction.

The National Wrestling Alliance (NWA) Wrestling Legends Hall of Heroes is a professional wrestling hall of fame that honors people who have competed or played other major roles in the NWA. Organized by wrestling promoter Greg Price, the hall is separate from the NWA Hall of Fame and is not officially endorsed by the company, but the NWA has given permission for the use of its name. An induction ceremony takes place at the annual NWA Legends Fanfest Weekend. In 2007, there were seven inductees in the inaugural class. Seven more honorees were added the following year, and another eight were added to the Hall of Heroes in 2009. The 2009 induction ceremony took place on August 7 and was hosted by Jim Cornette.

Honorees are inducted for work in any area of wrestling, including competing in the ring, managing, refereeing, promoting, and announcing. During the ceremony, personalities from the NWA deliver speeches and present the inductees with plaques. These plaques have the logo of the NWA Legends Fanfest and are identical aside from the year of induction and the inductee's name. Many presenters have been involved in the inductee's career; for example, Gary Hart, who managed Rip Hawk and Swede Hanson, inducted both men, and Buddy Roberts was inducted by Michael Hayes and Jimmy Garvin, both of whom were fellow members of The Fabulous Freebirds. Inductees and other former NWA wrestlers are seated at tables with fans to provide an intimate atmosphere. Although most people honored by the hall attend the dinner and induction ceremony, some are inducted posthumously and others are unable to attend for medical reasons.

Although most wrestlers are inducted individually, tag teams have been inducted together. Ole and Gene Anderson were among the members of the inaugural class; they competed together for many years as storyline brothers. The Fargo brothers (Don, Jackie, and Sonny), who also wrestled in tag team matches together despite not being related in real life, are scheduled to be inducted together in 2009. George Scott, inducted in 2007, and his brother Sandy, inducted in 2008, are the only true relatives in the hall. Rip Hawk and Swede Hanson, who competed as the original Blond Bombers, were also inducted together in 2007.

Like most wrestling halls of fame, there is no physical building that houses the NWA Wrestling Legends Hall of Heroes.

== Inductees ==
Year	Ring name (Birth name)	Inducted by	Inducted for	Notes
2007	Gene Anderson	Bill Eadie	Wrestling	Posthumous induction; won the NWA World Tag Team Championship (Mid-Atlantic version) (7 times) and NWA Georgia Tag Team Championship (7 times)
2007	Ole Anderson (Alan Rogowski)	Bill Eadie	Wrestling	Won the NWA Mid-Atlantic/Atlantic Coast Tag Team Championship (7 times) and NWA World Tag Team Championship (Mid-Atlantic version) (8 times)
2007	Penny Banner (Mary Ann Kostecki)	Nickla Roberts	Women's wrestling	Won the NWA Women's World Tag Team Championship (1 time)
2007	Bob Caudle	David Crockett	Announcing	Worked as commentator for Jim Crockett Promotions
2007	Swede Hanson (Robert Ford Hanson)	Gary Hart	Wrestling	Posthumous induction; won the NWA Atlantic Coast Tag Team Championship (4 times) and NWA Southern Tag Team Championship (Mid-Atlantic version) (1 time)
2007	Rip Hawk (Harvey Evers)	Gary Hart	Wrestling	Won the NWA Eastern States Heavyweight Championship (4 times) and NWA Mid-Atlantic/Atlantic Coast Tag Team Championship (5 times)
2007	George Scott	Tommy Young	Wrestling and Promoting	Won the NWA Southern Tag Team Championship (Mid-Atlantic version) (2 times) and worked as booker for Jim Crockett Promotions
2008	Paul Jones (Paul Frederick)	Jack Brisco	Wrestling and Managing	Won the NWA Mid-Atlantic Heavyweight Championship (3 times), NWA World Tag Team Championship (Mid-Atlantic version) (6 times), and NWA Mid-Atlantic/Atlantic Coast Tag Team Championship (6 times); managed Paul Jones' Army in Jim Crockett Promotions
2008	Ivan Koloff (Oreal Perras)	Don Kernodle	Wrestling	Won the NWA Mid-Atlantic Heavyweight Championship (3 times) and NWA World Tag Team Championship (Mid-Atlantic version) (4 times)
2008	Thunderbolt Patterson (Claude Patterson)	Ole Anderson	Wrestling	Won the NWA Georgia Tag Team Championship (3 times) and NWA Atlantic Coast Tag Team Championship (1 time)
2008	Buddy Roberts (Dale Hey)	Jimmy Garvin and Michael Hayes	Wrestling	Won the NWA World Six-Man Tag Team Championship (Texas version) / WCWA World Six-Man Tag Team Championship (6 times) and NWA Mid-Atlantic Tag Team Championship (1 time)
2008	Sandy Scott (Angus Mackay Scott)	Bob Caudle	Wrestling and Promoting	Worked as an executive for Jim Crockett Promotions and won the NWA World Tag Team Championship (Central States version) (1 time) and NWA Southern Tag Team Championship (Mid-Atlantic version) (3 times)
2008	Grizzly Smith (Aurelian Smith)	Magnum T. A.	Wrestling	Won the NWA United States Tag Team Championship (Tri-State version) (2 times) and NWA Texas Heavyweight Championship (1 time)
2008	Johnny Weaver (Kenneth Eugene Weaver)	Rip Hawk	Wrestling	Posthumous induction; won the NWA Atlantic Coast/Mid-Atlantic Tag Team Championship (8 times) and NWA Southern Tag Team Championship (Mid-Atlantic version) (6 times)
2009	Don Fargo (Don Kalt)	Jerry Jarrett & Steve Keirn	Wrestling	Won the NWA Southern Tag Team Championship (Mid-America version) (2 times) and NWA World Tag Team Championship (Mid-America version) (6 times)
2009	Jackie Fargo (Henry Faggart)	Jerry Jarrett & Steve Keirn	Wrestling	Won the NWA World Tag Team Championship (Mid-America version) (10 times) and NWA Southern Tag Team Championship (Mid-America version) (22 times)
2009	Sonny Fargo (Jack Lewis Faggart)	Jerry Jarrett & Steve Keirn	Wrestling	Posthumous induction; won the NWA Southern Tag Team Championship (Mid-America version) (3 times)
2009	Gary Hart (Gary Williams)	Sir Oliver Humperdink	Managing and Promoting	Posthumous induction; worked as a booker in World Class Championship Wrestling and managed several wrestlers in Mid-Atlantic Championship Wrestling
2009	Wahoo McDaniel (Edward McDaniel)	Tully Blanchard	Wrestling	Posthumous induction; won the NWA Mid-Atlantic Heavyweight Championship (6 times) and NWA World Tag Team Championship (Mid-Atlantic version) (4 times)
2009	Blackjack Mulligan (Robert Windham)	Ric Flair	Wrestling	Won the NWA Texas Heavyweight Championship (1 time) and NWA World Tag Team Championship (Mid-Atlantic version) (1 time)
2009	Nelson Royal	Brad Anderson, Tommy Angel & David Isley	Wrestling	Won the NWA Atlantic Coast Tag Team Championship (2 times)
2009	Lance Russell	Dave Brown	Announcing	Worked as commentator for wrestling events in the Memphis area
2010	Joe Blanchard	Dory Funk Jr	Promoter	Posthumous induction; Founded Southwest Championship Wrestling in 1978
2010	Danny Hodge	Jim Ross	Wrestling	Won the NWA World Junior Heavyweight Championship (6 times)
2010	Billy Robinson	Terry Funk	Wrestling	Won the NWA Southern Heavyweight Championship (Florida version) (1 time) and the NWA United National Championship (1 time)
2010	Greg Valentine	Jerry Brisco	Wrestling	Won the United States Championship (3 times) and the NWA Mid-Atlantic Heavyweight Championship (2 times)
2010	Johnny Valentine	Jerry Brisco	Wrestling	Won the NWA Brass Knuckles Championship (5 times)
2010	Mr. Wrestling II	Jody Hamilton	Wrestling	Best known for his appearances with Championship Wrestling from Florida, Mid-South Wrestling and Georgia Championship Wrestling.
2010	Mr. Wrestling	Jody Hamilton	Wrestling	American professional wrestler, better known by his ring names, Mr. Wrestling and Tim Woods
2011	Jody Hamilton	Nick Patrick	Wrestling	Won the NWA Georgia Tag Team Championship (14 times)
2011	Tom Renesto	Nick Patrick	Wrestling	Won the NWA World Tag Team Championship (Georgia version) (2 times) and the NWA North American Tag Team Championship (2 times)
2011	Ron Garvin	Mac McMurray	Wrestling	Won the NWA World Heavyweight Championship (1 time)
2011	Sir Oliver Humperdink	Diamond Dallas Page and Mick Karch	Managing	Worked for Jim Crockett Promotions and Florida Championship Wrestling
2011	Gordon Solie	Roddy Piper	Announcing	Regarded as one of the most influential wrestling announcers. Worked in Championship Wrestling from Florida, Georgia Championship Wrestling, Continental Championship Wrestling, and World Championship Wrestling.
2011	Ray Stevens	Nick Bockwinkle	Wrestling	Won the NWA Southern Junior Heavyweight Championship (3 times) and the NWA World Tag Team Championship (Mid-Atlantic version) (3 times)
2011	Masked Superstar	Stan Hansen	Wrestling	Won the NWA Georgia Heavyweight Championship (4 times) and the NWA National Tag Team Championship (3 times).
2011	Ted Turner	Thunderbolt Patterson	Promoter	Purchased Jim Crockett Promotions which he renamed World Championship Wrestling (WCW) in 1988
2013	Magnum T. A.	Tully Blanchard	Wrestling	Former 2 times United States Champion
2013	Lars Anderson	Brad Anderson	Wrestling	One half of The Minnesota Wrecking Crew. Won many Tag Team title in the NWA territories
2013	Dennis Condrey	Jerry Jarrett	Wrestling	One half of the Midnight Express
2013	Jim Cornette	Jerry Jarrett	Manager	Long time manager of the Midnight Express
2013	Bobby Eaton	Jerry Jarrett	Wrestling	One half of the Midnight Express
2013	Robert Gibson	Jerry Jarrett	Wrestling	One half of The Rock 'n' Roll Express
2013	Stan Lane	Jerry Jarrett	Wrestling	One half of the Midnight Express with Bobby Eaton and one half of The Fabulous Ones with Steve Keirn
2013	Danny Miller	Jerry Brisco	Wrestling	the first NWA/WCW World Television Champion
2013	Ricky Morton	Jerry Jarrett	Wrestling	One half of The Rock 'n' Roll Express
2013	Les Thatcher	J. J. Dillon	Wrestling and Trainer	Former NWA World Tag Team Championship (Mid-America version) (1 time)
2014	Arn Anderson	David Crockett	Wrestling	Former NWA World Tag Team Championship (Mid-America version) (5 times), Former NWA/WCW World Television Championship (4 times)
2014	Tully Blanchard	David Crockett	Wrestling	Former NWA World Tag Team Championship (Mid-America version) (1 time), Won the United States Championship (3 times)
2014	J. J. Dillon	David Crockett	Manager	Manager of the Four Horsemen
2014	The Poffo Family (Angelo, Randy and Lanny)		Wrestling	Famed pro wrestling family
2014	Jerry Brisco	Danny Miller	Wrestling	Former NWA World Tag Team Championship (Mid-America version) (3 times), First NWA Mid-Atlantic Heavyweight Champion
2014	Boris Malenko		Wrestling and Trainer	WCWA World Heavyweight Championship (1 time)
2014	Ox Baker		Wrestling	Former NWA United States Heavyweight Championship (Detroit version) (1 time)
2014	Tommy Young	Jim Cornette	Referee	Long time National Wrestling Alliance and Jim Crockett Promotions/World Championship Wrestling referee
2015	Ricky Steamboat	Mark & Chris Youngblood	Wrestling	Former NWA World Tag Team Championship (Mid-America version) (1 time), Won the United States Championship (4 times)
2015	Jay Youngblood	Mark & Chris Youngblood	Wrestling	Former NWA World Tag Team Championship (Mid-America version) (5 times)
2015	Jim Crockett Sr.		Promoter	Founder of Jim Crockett Promotions
2016	Dusty Rhodes	Magnum T. A.	Wrestling & booker	NWA World Heavyweight Champion (3 times), NWA United States Champion (1 time)
2016	The Road Warriors (Hawk and Animal)	Jim Cornette	Wrestling	Former NWA, AWA and WWF tag team champions
2016	Paul Ellering	Jim Cornette	Manager	Manager of The Road Warriors
2016	Jimmy Valiant	Paul Jones	Wrestling	Held numerous titles in many territories
2016	Nickla Roberts		Valet	Better known as Baby Doll former valet for Tully Blanchard, Dusty Rhodes, Ric Flair and Larry Zbyszko
2016	Dick Bourne	Bob Caudle	Journalism	Co-Publisher of the Mid-Atlantic Gateway website.
2016	David Chappell	Bob Caudle	Journalism	Co-Publisher of the Mid-Atlantic Gateway website.

== See also ==
- List of professional wrestling halls of fame
- List of professional wrestling awards
