= Blond Bombers =

Professional wrestling tag team

The Blond Bombers is a name used by several tag teams in professional wrestling. The first team to use the name was the combination of Rip Hawk and Swede Hanson. It was later used by Pat Patterson and Ray Stevens, who began teaming in 1965. Larry Latham and Wayne Farris used the name in the late 1970s in the Continental Wrestling Association and, from 1979 to 1980, Stanley Lane and Bryan St. John competed as the Blonde Bombers while wrestling in Championship Wrestling from Florida. In the early 2000s, the team of Tank and Chad Toland appeared as the Blond Bombers in Ohio Valley Wrestling before changing their team name upon entering World Wrestling Entertainment. Each incarnation held title belts together at least once. Patterson and Stevens were inducted as a team into the Professional Wrestling Hall of Fame in 2006.

== History ==
=== Rip Hawk and Swede Hanson ===
After joining Jim Crockett Promotions in the early 1960s, Rip Hawk met Swede Hanson, who was competing as a singles wrestler. Hawk approached Jim Crockett, Sr. about forming a tag team with Hanson, and Crockett agreed. Both had blond hair and were powerful wrestlers, so they called themselves the Blond Bombers. They were managed by Gary Hart and later by Homer O'Dell. Hawk spoke for the team during interviews while Hanson stood silently beside him.

After teaming for several years, Hawk and Hanson won the Florida version of the NWA World Tag Team Championship by defeating Hiro Matsuda and Duke Keomuka on August 3, 1965. They also competed in Australia's World Championship Wrestling, where they won the IWA World Tag Team Championship in 1970.

Much of their success, however, came in Jim Crockett Promotions, where they were hated heel (villain) wrestlers. They won the NWA Atlantic Coast Tag Team Championship four times between 1968 and 1971. They feuded with several teams, including Johnny Weaver and George Becker as well as the pairing of Paul Jones and Nelson Royal. Jim Crockett Promotions also held matches in which heel teams faced other heel teams. The Blond Bombers faced such teams as the Anderson Brothers (Gene and Ole) or Brute Bernard and Skull Murphy These matches, known as "Battles of the Bullies", were unusual because heels almost always compete against faces (fan favorites).

Hanson had a heart attack in 1971, and Hawk was teamed with rookie wrestler Ric Flair. Hanson became a face upon his return to the ring, and he feuded with Hawk and faced him in a series of matches. They began wrestling in Texas, where they won the NWA Western States Tag Team Championship three times from 1976 to 1977. Hanson left the territory after their final reign, which ended the tag team combination. They were inducted as a team into the NWA Legends Hall of Heroes in 2007 by former manager Gary Hart.

Hanson died of sepsis on February 19, 2002. Hawk died on December 22, 2012. Gary Hart died following a heart attack on March 16, 2008.

=== Pat Patterson and Ray Stevens ===
While wrestling in Oregon, Pat Patterson heard many wrestlers tell him that he would be a natural fit as a tag team partner of Ray Stevens, who competed in San Francisco. Patterson moved to San Francisco and dyed his hair blond to match Stevens, who had used the nickname "The Blond Bomber" as a singles wrestler. They defeated the team of The Destroyer and Billy Red Lyons to win the San Francisco version of the AWA World Tag Team Championship on April 17, 1965. They held the belts for over a year and a half before dropping them to the Mongolian Stomper and Ciclon Negro in December 1966. They won the title back in a rematch the following month and held it for another three months. On April 8, 1967, they lost the belts to longtime rival Pepper Gomez and future World Wide Wrestling Federation Champion Pedro Morales. They continued to team together, however, until the end of the year, when Patterson left the area to compete in Japan.

When Patterson returned to the San Francisco area, he feuded with Stevens, who had become a face. This feud included Stevens and Peter Maivia defeating Patterson and Superstar Billy Graham to win the San Francisco version of the NWA World Tag Team Championship on January 23, 1971, and Patterson and Graham regaining the belts in a rematch the following month. Patterson and Stevens also competed in singles matches; Stevens defeated Patterson in a Texas Death match on July 11, 1970, to win the San Francisco version of the NWA United States Heavyweight Championship.

The pair were later reunited in the American Wrestling Association, where they won the AWA World Tag Team Championship on September 23, 1978. The following year, Patterson began competing primarily in the World Wrestling Federation, although he and Stevens continued to team occasionally in the AWA until late 1982. They were inducted into the Professional Wrestling Hall of Fame as a team in 2006 and have been described as the "single greatest tag team" of all time.

Stevens died of a heart attack on May 3, 1996. Patterson died of liver failure caused by a blood clot on December 2, 2020.

=== Larry Latham and Wayne Farris ===
Latham and Farris both made their wrestling debuts in 1976 and later signed with the Continental Wrestling Association (CWA). CWA owners Jerry Jarrett and Jerry Lawler paired Latham and Farris as a new incarnation of the Blond Bombers. Managed by Sergeant Danny Davis, the Bombers were the promotion's top heel tag team, Their first championship came on June 15, 1979, when they won an infamous match against Jerry Lawler and Bill Dundee in Tupelo, Mississippi. After the Blond Bombers controversially won the title, Lawler and Dundee attacked the new champions and fought with them in the concession stands. They soon dropped the belts to Robert Gibson and his real-life brother Ricky, but they regained them in a rematch later that summer. Meanwhile, the Fabulous Freebirds, who had been the region's number two heel tag team became faces and challenged the Bombers for the belts. They won the title from the Latham and Farris in September 1979, but the Bombers won a rematch to reclaim the championship.

After dropping the AWA Southern Tag Team Championship for a third and final time, the Blond Bombers began to challenge for the NWA Mid-America Tag Team Championship. They defeated George Gulas and Ken Lucas to win the belts on December 15, 1979. While holding the title, they continued to feud with Gulas. When they attacked him one day, his estranged partner Bobby Eaton rescued him; Gulas and Eaton reunited as The Jet Set and defeated the Bombers to win the championship. Latham and Farris regained the belts in a rematch against The Jet Set but later dropped them to Rocky Brewer and Pat Rose. The Blond Bombers had one last reign with the Mid-America belts, as they defeated Eaton and Great Togo in July 1980. They held the title until September 3, when they lost a match to Robert Gibson and Don Fargo. After losing the belts, Farris left to compete in Puerto Rico's World Wrestling Council. Upon returning to Tennessee, he found other partners and had two more reigns as an AWA Southern Tag Team Champion. Latham soon left Tennessee to compete in the World Wrestling Federation, where he held the WWF Tag Team Championship as Spot, a member of The Moondogs.

Latham died of a heart attack in the ring during Jerry Lawler's "birthday bash" show on November 29, 2003.

=== Stanley Lane and Bryan St. John ===
Stanley Lane, who had dubbed himself the "Nature Boy" in honor of his trainer, "Nature Boy" Ric Flair, debuted for Championship Wrestling from Florida in December 1978. He was soon paired with Bryan St. John, and the team dubbed themselves the Blonde Bombers. St. John had been feuding with Ray Stevens, and the Bombers continued this rivalry. Together, they challenged NWA Florida Tag Team Champions Stevens and Mike Graham for the title belts. On October 30, 1979, the heel duo of Lane and St. John defeated the champions to win the title. As a result, St. John claimed victory in his rivalry with Stevens. The following week, they defended the belts against Mr. Hito and Mr. Sakurada. Because of a controversial finish, the championship was vacated, and a tournament was held. St. John sustained a wrist injury, however, and the Bombers were unable to participate. Graham teamed with Steve Keirn to win the tournament on November 13 by defeating Hito and Sakurada.

When St. John recovered, he and Lane faced the new champions and defeated them for the title on November 25. They defended the title against several team and entered into a feud with the Brisco Brothers (Jack and Jerry), who had held the belts together on seven previous occasions. This rivalry also included a singles match between St. John and Jack Brisco, in which their partners were handcuffed together outside of the ring to prevent interference. In March 1980, Jack Brisco teamed with Jim Garvin to win the belts from the Bombers. Lane and St. John had one final reign with the championship after defeating Garvin and Keirn, who was substituting for Brisco, on June 7, 1980. That summer, the Brisco Brothers regained the belts, after which the Blonde Bombers parted ways. St. John soon retired, and Lane focused on building a career as a singles wrestler in Georgia before forming several other tag teams. Later in his career, he teamed with former rival Steve Keirn to form The Fabulous Ones; he was also a member of The Midnight Express and The Heavenly Bodies.

=== Tank Toland and Chad Toland ===
The Toland Brothers (Tank and Chad) also used the name in Ohio Valley Wrestling (OVW), a developmental territory of World Wrestling Entertainment (WWE). They won the OVW Southern Tag Team Championship on April 6, 2005, by defeating The Thrillseekers (Matt Cappotelli and Johnny Jeter). They held the belts for six months before dropping them to Seth Skyfire and Chet Jablonski. The Tolands later competed for WWE as The Dicks (James and Chad Dick), a team dressed as Chippendales dancers. They debuted in October 2005 and were released five months later.

== Championships and accomplishments ==
- Rip Hawk and Swede Hanson

- Championship Wrestling from Florida

- NWA World Tag Team Championship (Florida version) (1 time)

- Mid-Atlantic Championship Wrestling

- NWA Atlantic Coast Tag Team Championship (4 times)

- NWA Western States Sports

- NWA Western States Tag Team Championship (3 times)

- World Championship Wrestling (Australia)

- IWA World Tag Team Championship (1 time)

- Pat Patterson and Ray Stevens

- American Wrestling Association

- AWA World Tag Team Championship (1 time)
- AWA World Tag Team Championship (San Francisco version) (2 times)

- Professional Wrestling Hall of Fame

- Class of 2006

- Larry Latham and Wayne Farris

- American Wrestling Association

- AWA Southern Tag Team Championship (3 times)

- Continental Wrestling Association

- NWA Mid-America Tag Team Championship (3 times)

- Stanley Lane and Bryan St. John

- Championship Wrestling from Florida

- NWA Florida Tag Team Championship (3 times)

- Chad Toland and Tank Toland

- Ohio Valley Wrestling

- OVW Southern Tag Team Championship (1 time)
