= Brute Bernard =

Canadian professional wrestler (1921 – 1984)

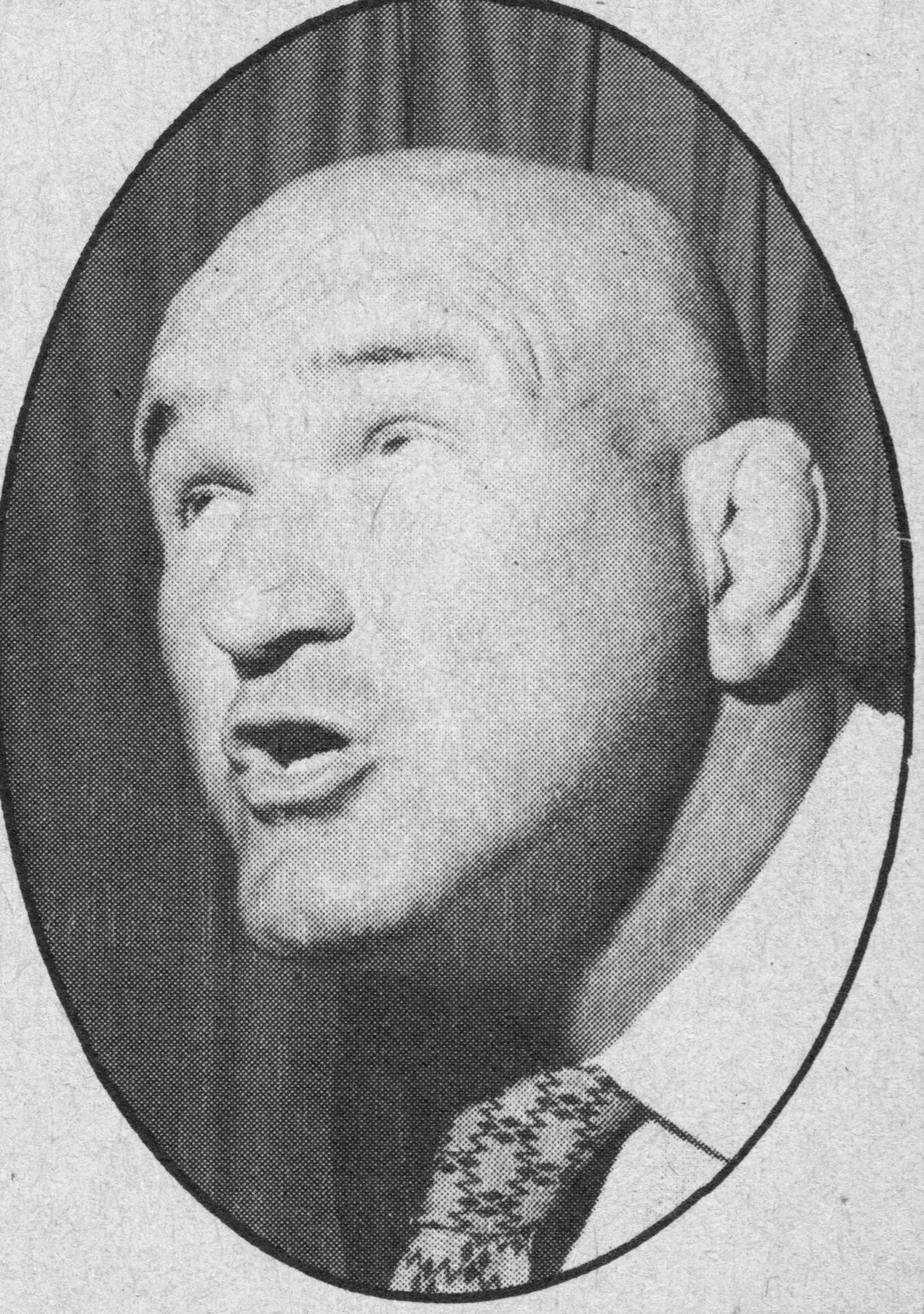

Personal information
- Born: James Prudhomme; June 6, 1921
- Died: July 14, 1984 (aged 63)
- Spouse: Betty Jo Hawkins

Professional wrestling career
- Ring name(s): Brute Berhard; Brute Bernard; Jim Bernard
- Billed height: 6 ft 2 in (188 cm)
- Billed weight: 270 lb (122 kg)
- Billed from: Quebec
- Trained by: Jack Britton
- Debut: 1957
- Retired: 1980

James Prudhomme (June 6, 1921 – July 14, 1984), was a Canadian professional wrestler, better known by the ring names Brute Bernard or Jim 'Brute' Bernhard.

He spent much of his career wrestling as part of a tag team with Skull Murphy. He competed for several wrestling promotions associated with the National Wrestling Alliance (NWA). He also worked for the Australia-based World Championship Wrestling (WCW) as well as the World Wide Wrestling Federation (WWWF). He died of a gunshot while cleaning a rifle in 1984.

== Professional wrestling career ==
=== Early career (1957-1966) ===
Bernard was discovered by wrestling promoter Jack Britton, who convinced him to become a wrestler. He made his debut in 1957, competing in Ontario. He initially wrestled under his real name, but he later took on the name Brute Bernard. He also competed as in Detroit for a promotion run by Ed Farhat. He teamed up with fellow Canadian wrestler Skull Murphy throughout the 1960s. Their first championship came on May 16, 1963, when they won the WWWF United States Tag Team Championship. They held the title belts for almost six months before dropping them to Killer Kowalski and Gorilla Monsoon on November 14. They then began competing for Championship Wrestling from Florida, an NWA territory. They participated in a tag team tournament and won the vacant Florida version of the NWA World Tag Team Championship in 1964. Bernard and Murphy feuded with Hiro Matsuda and Duke Keomuka over the belts and traded the belts back and forth before losing them to Matsusa and Keomuka for good. Bernard and Murphy worked for World Championship Wrestling in 1966, where they won the IWA World Tag Team Championship twice.

=== Texas (1967) ===
Murphy remained in Australia, while Bernard returned to the United States to compete for World Class Championship Wrestling in Texas. He defeated Fritz Von Erich, patriarch of the Von Erich family for the Texas version of the NWA United States Heavyweight Championship in March 1967. That year, he had four more title reigns, as he won the NWA Texas Brass Knuckles Championship twice and teamed with his manager Mike Paidousis to win the NWA American Tag Team Championship twice.

=== Later career (1968-1980) ===
Bernard and Murphy reunited in Australia, where they won the IWA World Tag Team Championship twice more in 1968 and 1969. They also competed for Jim Crockett Promotions in the Carolinas, where they participated in a series of "battle of the bullies" matches. These bouts went against the tradition of having faces (fan favorites) competing against heels (villains), as Bernard and Murphy competed against fellow heels the Blond Bombers (Swede Hanson and Rip Hawk).

Murphy died of a heart attack on March 23, 1970. Bernard took on a new partner, Larry Hamilton, and the pair won the NWA Atlantic Coast Tag Team Championship in October 1971. They also competed in Texas, where they won the NWA American Tag Team Championship.

Bernard continued to wrestle in Australia and won the NWA Austra-Asian Heavyweight Championship by defeating Spiros Arion on November 4, 1972. He held the belt for three weeks before dropping it back to Arion. He also won the country's World Brass Knuckles Championship twice. Back in Jim Crockett Promotions, he formed a tag team with Jay York. They had rivalries with the team of George Scott and Nelson Royal as well as the Anderson family (Gene and Ole). Bernard and York were managed by Beauregarde, who also teamed with them in six-man matches. Bernard and York won the NWA Mid-Atlantic Tag Team Championship by defeating Scott and Royal on November 26, 1973 but lost the belts to the Andersons one month later.

Bernard wrestled for several promotions in his final years as a wrestler. He returned to Detroit, where he competed as The Brute. He also teamed with Frank Morrell in Texas to win the NWA Western States Tag Team Championship in 1977. He returned to the Carolinas and wrestled for Jim Crockett Promotions until he was released due to his age. He continued to wrestle occasionally; in his final match, he refused to go along with the scripted finish. The referee, Dave Routh, declared the result a double countout. Bernard got upset in the locker room and attacked Routh. He broke Routh's nose and was fired as a result.

== Personal life ==
Bernard was married to female professional wrestler Betty Jo Hawkins. He died in 1984 of an accidental gunshot wound. One story states that Bernard was playing Russian roulette.

== Championships and accomplishments ==
- Big Time Promotions
  - Big Time Television Championship (1 time)
- Championship Wrestling from Florida
  - NWA World Tag Team Championship (Florida version) (2 times) - with Skull Murphy
- Mid-Atlantic Championship Wrestling
  - NWA Atlantic Coast Tag Team Championship (1 time) - with Larry Hamilton
  - NWA Mid-Atlantic Tag Team Championship (1 time) - with Jay York
- NWA Big Time Wrestling
  - NWA American Tag Team Championship (3 times) - with Mike Paidousis (2) and The Missouri Mauler (1)
  - NWA Brass Knuckles Championship (Texas version) (2 times)
  - NWA United States Heavyweight Championship (Texas version) (1 time)
- North American Wrestling Alliance
  - NAWA Brass Knuckles Championship (1 time)
- Western States Sports
  - NWA Western States Tag Team Championship (1 time) - with Frank Morrell
- World Championship Wrestling (Australia)
  - NWA Austra-Asian Heavyweight Championship (1 time)
  - IWA World Tag Team Championship (5 times) - with Skull Murphy
  - World Brass Knuckles Championship (Australia version) (2 times)
- World Wide Wrestling Federation
  - WWWF United States Tag Team Championship (1 time) - with Skull Murphy
