= Paul Jones (wrestler) =

American professional wrestler and manager (1942-2018)

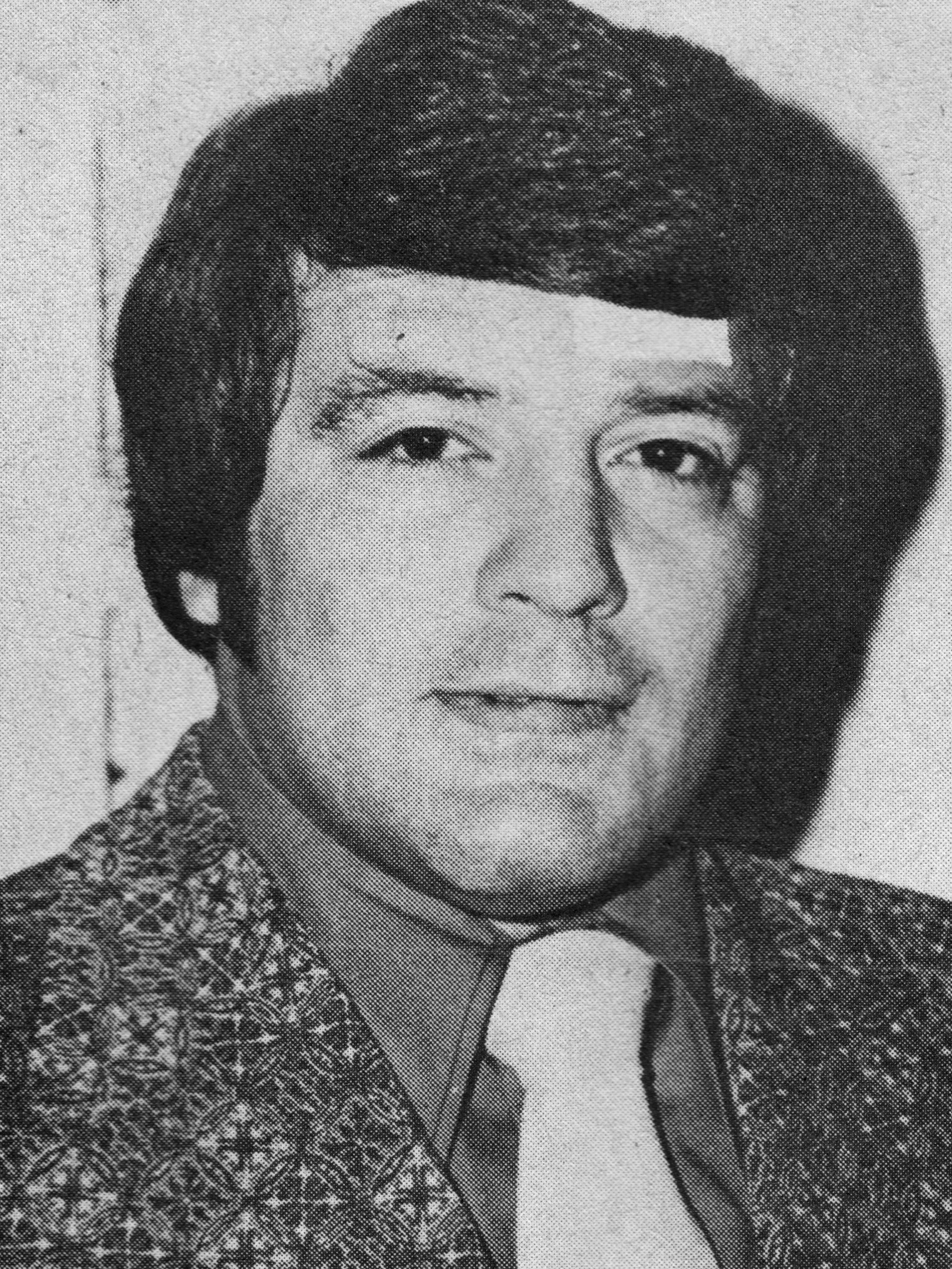

Personal information
- Born: Paul Frederick; June 16, 1942 Port Arthur, Texas, U.S.
- Died: c. April 18, 2018 (aged 75) near Atlanta, Georgia, U.S.

Professional wrestling career
- Ring name(s): Al Fredericks; Mr. Florida; Paul Jones
- Billed height: 6 ft 0 in (183 cm)
- Billed weight: 230 lb (104 kg)
- Trained by: Paul Boesch; Morris Siegel
- Debut: 1961
- Retired: 1991

Paul Frederick (June 16, 1942 – c. April 18, 2018) was an American professional wrestler and professional wrestling manager, better known by his ring name, Paul Jones. He is best known for his appearances with professional wrestling promotions in the Southeastern United States, in particular with Mid-Atlantic Championship Wrestling – where he had 23 championship reigns and led the stable Paul Jones' Army – and Championship Wrestling from Florida.

== Early life ==
Frederick was born on June 16, 1942, in Port Arthur, Texas. He attended Thomas Jefferson High School. As a teenager, he boxed, spending seven years as a Golden Gloves boxer and winning the Texas Light Heavyweight Championship and Texas Heavyweight Championship. While working in a television studio, he met Paul Boesch, who suggested he become a professional wrestler and offered to train him.

== Professional wrestling career ==
=== Early career (1961–1968) ===
Frederick was trained to wrestle by Paul Boesch and Morris Sigel, debuting in 1961 under the ring name "Paul Jones". During his early career, he competed primarily for promotions in the Southern United States including the Texas-based promotion Big Time Wrestling, the Tennessee-based promotion NWA Mid-America and Championship Wrestling from Florida. He was nicknamed "Young" Paul Jones by promoter Paul Boesch during his stint in Texas to distinguish him from Andrew Lutzi, a Russian-born veteran wrestler (later the promoter of Georgia Championship Wrestling who had used the same name.

From late-1964 to early-1965, Jones toured Australia with World Championship Wrestling, wrestling as "Al Fredericks". After returning to the United States, he competed for the Oregon-based promotion Pacific Northwest Wrestling, holding the NWA Pacific Northwest Heavyweight Championship on two occasions and the NWA Pacific Northwest Tag Team Championship once, and in Canada for Northwest Wrestling Promotions in British Columbia and Alex Turk Promotions in Manitoba. He returned to the Southern United States in mid-1967.

In 1969, Jones appeared with the California-based promotion NWA Hollywood Wrestling, briefly holding the NWA Americas Tag Team Championship with Nelson Royal in 1969. In the same year, he toured Japan with the Japan Pro Wrestling Alliance, making repeat tours in 1970 and 1971. In 1973, he made a fourth tour of Japan, this time with All Japan Pro Wrestling.

=== Mid-Atlantic Championship Wrestling (1968–1972) ===
Jones first appeared with the North Carolina–based promotion Mid-Atlantic Championship Wrestling in 1968, forming a face tag team with veteran Nelson Royal. In September 1970, the duo defeated The Minnesota Wrecking Crew to win the NWA Atlantic Coast Tag Team Championship. They lost the championship to The Blond Bombers in December 1970. Jones and Royal continued to team until 1972, when Jones left Mid-Atlantic Championship Wrestling to compete for Championship Wrestling from Florida.

=== Championship Wrestling from Florida (1972–1974, 1980) ===
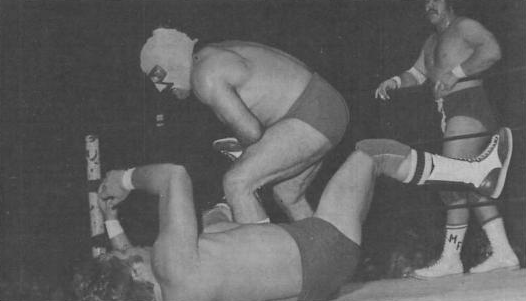
Jones (center, masked) wrestling as Mr. Florida, c. 1980

In 1972, Jones returned to Championship Wrestling from Florida, where he adopted a brash heel persona and the nickname "Number One" Paul Jones. Jones was convinced to become a heel by Jack Brisco, who wagered him a case of Canadian Club whisky that he would earn more money in a year as a heel than he ever had as a face. Jones held the NWA Florida Heavyweight Championship on four occasions, on one occasion in July 1972 throwing the championship belt off the Gandy Bridge into Tampa Bay in front of thousands of spectators in a display of arrogance. Jones also held the NWA Southern Heavyweight Championship (Florida version) once, the NWA Brass Knuckles Championship (Florida version) once, and the NWA Florida Television Championship twice – for several days in June 1972 holding the NWA Florida Heavyweight Championship, NWA Florida Television Championship and NWA Brass Knuckles Championship (Florida version) simultaneously – before leaving in 1974.

Jones briefly returned to the promotion once more in 1980, performing under a mask as "Mr. Florida" until being unmasked by The Super Destroyer.

=== Mid-Atlantic Championship Wrestling / World Championship Wrestling (1973–1989) ===
==== Championship reigns (1973–1982) ====
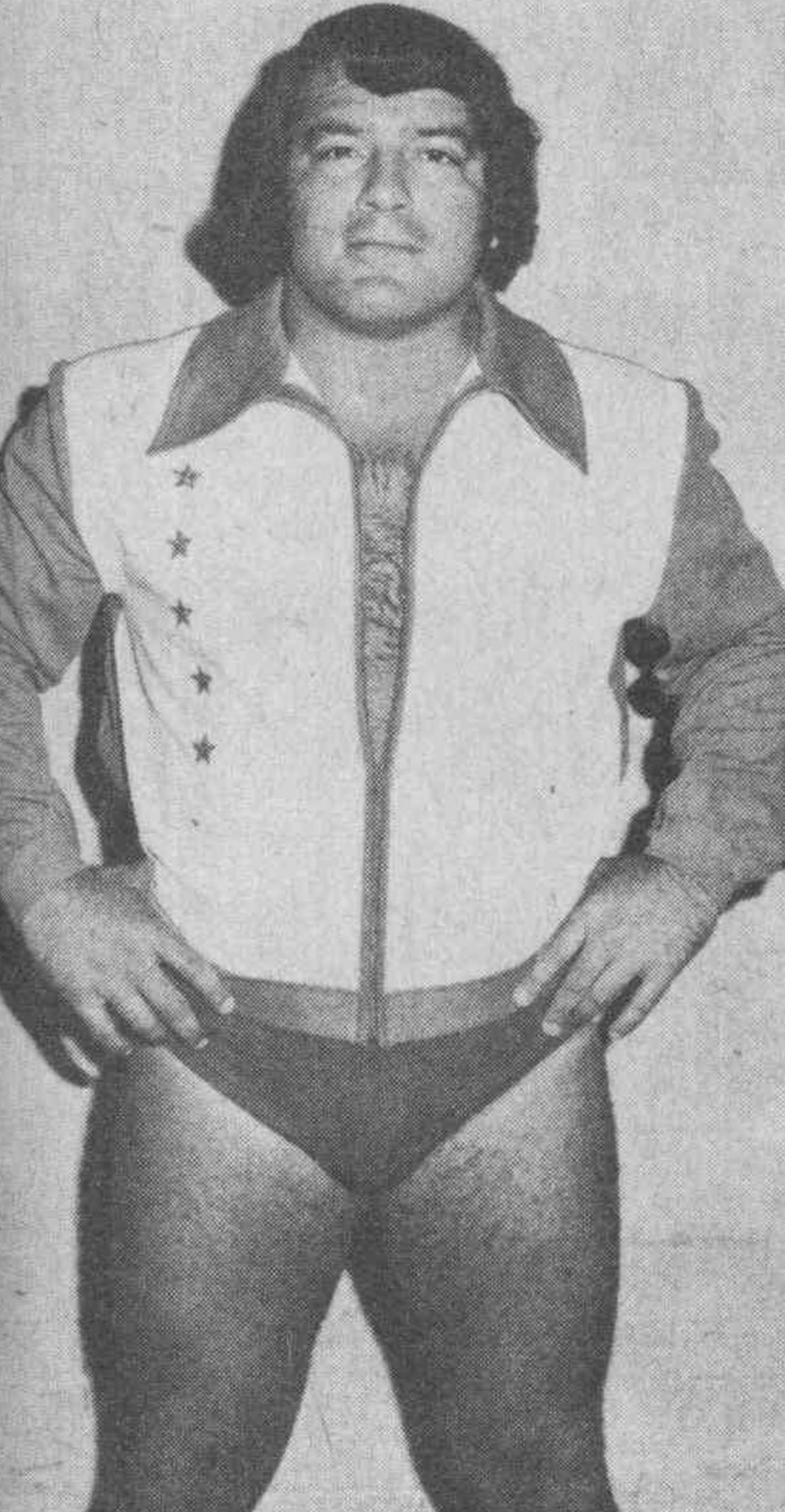
Jones, c. 1973

Jones resumed appearing regularly with Mid-Atlantic Championship Wrestling in late 1973. In April 1974, he and Bob Bruggers defeated The Andersons for the NWA Mid-Atlantic Tag Team Championship, losing the championship to Ric Flair and Rip Hawk in July 1974. Jones won his first NWA Mid-Atlantic Television Championship several days later, defeating Ivan Koloff in a Texas Death Match. He held the championship until October, when Koloff defeated him in a rematch. Jones held the championship on a total of five occasions over the next four years. Jones and Tiger Conway Jr. won the NWA Mid-Atlantic Tag Team Championship from Flair and Hawk in December 1974, losing to The Andersons in February 1975.

Jones began feuding with Johnny Valentine, with a match between them on December 25, 1974, selling out the Park Center. In March 1975, Jones defeated Valentine to win the NWA Mid-Atlantic Heavyweight Championship in controversial fashion; he was stripped of the championship 10 days later. In May 1975, Jones and Wahoo McDaniel defeated The Andersons to win the NWA World Tag Team Championship (Mid-Atlantic version). The Andersons regained the championship the next month in a televised rematch known as the "Supreme Sacrifice" match, which saw Ole Anderson ram his brother Gene's head into McDaniel's head with enough force to knock both men unconscious, enabling Ole Anderson to pin McDaniel.

After the NWA United States Heavyweight Championship (Mid-Atlantic version) was vacated when Johnny Valentine was injured in a plane crash, Jones competed in a one-night tournament on November 9, 1975, to crown a new champion, winning four bouts before losing to Terry Funk in the final. Jones defeated Funk for the championship in a rematch held later that month. He went on to trade the championship with Blackjack Mulligan, holding it on a total of three occasions before his final reign ended in December 1976.

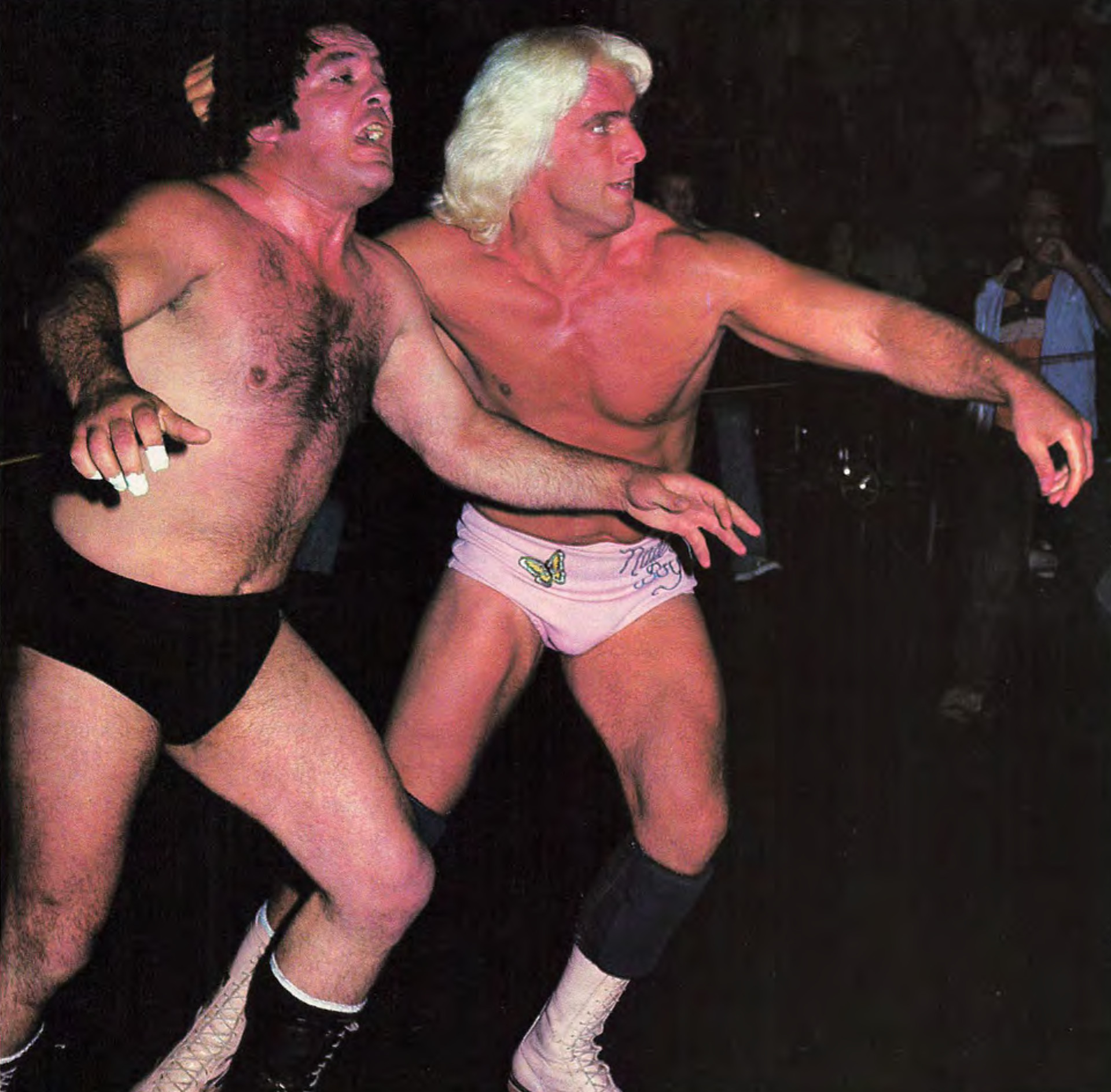
Jones (left) wrestling Ric Flair, c. 1979

In 1975, Jones began teaming with Ricky Steamboat. They held the NWA World Tag Team Championship (Mid-Atlantic version) on one occasion and the NWA Mid-Atlantic Tag Team Championship on three occasions. Their alliance ended in December 1978 when Jones attacked Steamboat at the end of a battle royal, turning heel.

In 1977, Jones wrestled for Georgia Championship Wrestling for several months, feuding with Dick Slater and briefly holding the NWA Georgia Heavyweight Championship. From 1979 to 1984, he appeared sporadically with Maple Leaf Wrestling in Ontario, Canada.

After turning heel, Jones formed a new alliance with Baron von Raschke (with whom Jones had previously briefly feuded), with the duo winning the NWA World Tag Team Championship (Mid-Atlantic version) twice in 1979 and feuding with tag teams such as Flair and Mulligan and Jay Youngblood and Steamboat. The team ended when Jones turned on von Raschke. Jones subsequently began teaming with The Masked Superstar (another former foe), winning the NWA World Tag Team Championship (Mid-Atlantic version) again in 1980 and 1981.

In 1982, Sir Oliver Humperdink began managing Jones. He held the NWA Mid-Atlantic Heavyweight Championship twice more in 1982, trading the championship with Jack Brisco.

==== Paul Jones' Army (1982–1989) ====
In 1982, Jones became a manager, forming a large stable called Paul Jones' Army. Many of Mid-Atlantic Championship Wrestling's top heels were members of Jones' stable at one time, among them The Masked Superstar, Superstar Billy Graham, Ivan Koloff, Rick Rude, Manny Fernandez, Abdullah the Butcher, and The Powers of Pain. Jones' character had a "startlingly uncomfortable presence"; at one point, he began wearing khakis and jackboots and cultivated a toothbrush moustache, giving him an appearance reminiscent of Adolf Hitler. Jones' villainous behaviour led fans to mock him with chants of "weasel".

By 1983, Jones had largely retired from in-ring competition due to accumulated back injuries. That year, Jones developed a gimmick of wearing tuxedos and created an angle in which he held a contest in which a large poster of himself dressed in a white tuxedo would be awarded as a prize to the winner. This led to a memorable episode of Mid-Atlantic Championship Wrestling, in which the winner of the poster was revealed to be a young, attractive woman. As she walked onto the ringside set to claim her prize, she attempted to embrace Jones with a kiss as her way of thanking him; but Jones backed away quickly and proceeded to berate her violently. Rufus R. Jones then came to the lady's rescue and was attacked by Paul. Paul then shoved the terrified young lady between himself and Rufus to block Rufus' defensive attack. This angle led to a brief feud between Paul Jones and Rufus R. Jones.

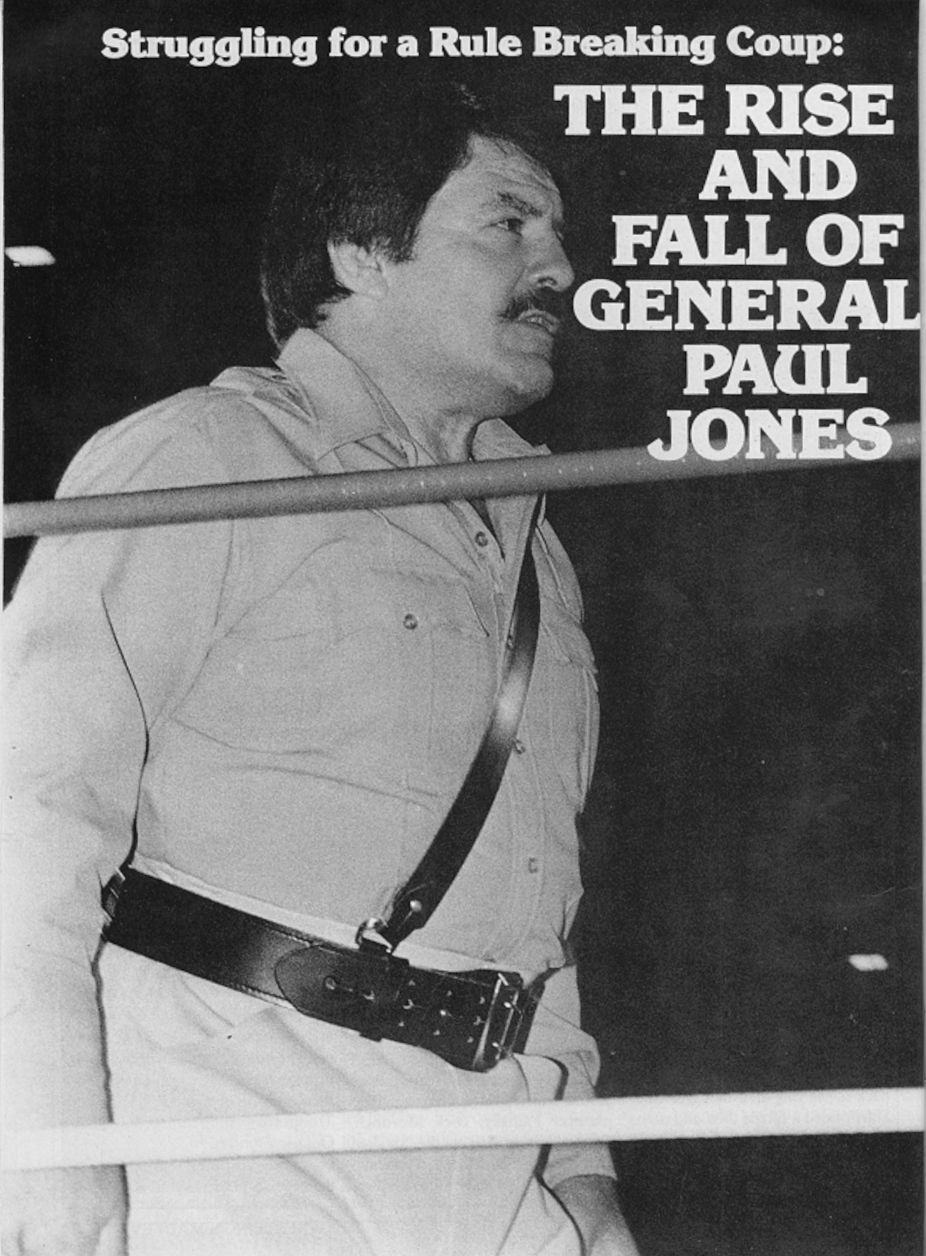
Jones, c. 1986

In the mid-1980s, Jones began a lengthy (and perhaps his most famous) feud with Jimmy Valiant. The feud included a tuxedo street fight loser leaves town match at Starrcade '84: The Million Dollar Challenge. It culminated in a hair versus hair match at Starrcade '86: The Skywalkers in November 1986 that was won by Valiant. Jones then began wearing a cowboy hat until his hair grew back to conceal his baldness.

In 1988, The Powers of Pain began feuding with the Road Warriors, with Jones claiming that The Powers of Pain were stronger than their opponents. In a memorable angle that aired on NWA World Championship Wrestling, The Powers of Pain faced The Road Warriors in a weightlifting contest with $50,000 on the line. The contest ended abruptly when Ivan Koloff blinded Road Warrior Animal using chalk dust, enabling The Powers of Pain to beat down The Road Warriors.

After the Powers of Pain left the NWA for the World Wrestling Federation in the summer of 1988, and with no one to manage, Jones left Mid-Atlantic Championship Wrestling - which had in the prior year been renamed World Championship Wrestling - in 1989.

=== Late career (1989–1991) ===
Jones spent the final years of his career competing on the independent circuit for promotions including the Pennsylvania-based Tri-State Wrestling Alliance and the North Carolina–based promotion South Atlantic Pro Wrestling. In 1990, he briefly held the SAPW Heavyweight Championship.

=== Retirement (1991–2018) ===
Frederick retired from professional wrestling in 1991. After retiring, he opened a body shop in Charlotte, North Carolina, later relocating to Georgia.

== Death ==
Frederick died in the week of April 18, 2018, at his home near Atlanta.

== Championships and accomplishments ==
- Big Time Promotions
  - Big Time Television Championship (1 time)
- Cauliflower Alley Club
  - Other honoree (2004)
- Championship Wrestling from Florida
  - NWA Brass Knuckles Championship (Florida version) (1 time)
  - NWA Florida Heavyweight Championship (4 times)
  - NWA Florida Television Championship (2 times)
  - NWA Southern Heavyweight Championship (Florida version) (1 time)
- Georgia Championship Wrestling
  - NWA Georgia Heavyweight Championship (1 time)

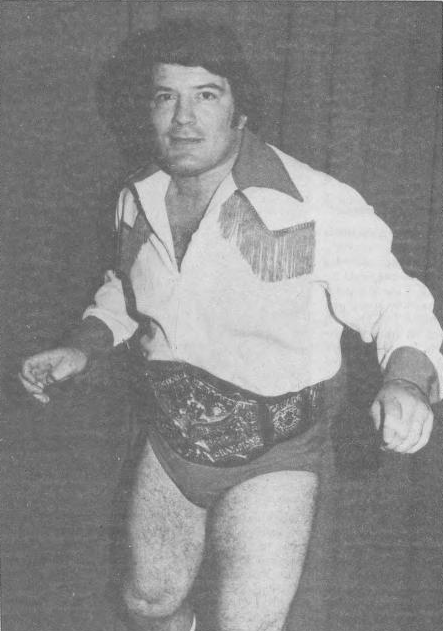
Jones as NWA World Tag Team Champion, c. 1981

- Mid-Atlantic Championship Wrestling
  - NWA Atlantic Coast Tag Team Championship/NWA Mid-Atlantic Tag Team Championship (6 times) - with Nelson Royal (1 time), Ricky Steamboat (3 times), Tiger Conway Jr. (1 time), and Bob Bruggers (1 time)
  - NWA Mid-Atlantic Heavyweight Championship (3 times)
  - NWA Mid-Atlantic Television Championship/NWA Television Championship (5 times)
  - NWA United States Heavyweight Championship (Mid-Atlantic version) (3 times)
  - NWA World Tag Team Championship (Mid-Atlantic version) (6 times) - with Ricky Steamboat (1 time), The Masked Superstar (2 times), Baron von Raschke (2 times), and Wahoo McDaniel (1 time)
- NWA Hollywood Wrestling
  - NWA Americas Tag Team Championship (1 time) - with Nelson Royal
- Pacific Northwest Wrestling
  - NWA Pacific Northwest Heavyweight Championship (2 times)
  - NWA Pacific Northwest Tag Team Championship (1 time)
- Pro Wrestling Illustrated
  - PWI Tag Team of the Year (1978) - with Ricky Steamboat
- South Atlantic Pro Wrestling
  - SAPW Heavyweight Championship (1 time)
- Wrestling Observer Newsletter
  - Worst Manager (1986)

== See also ==
- Paul Jones' Army
