= Skull Murphy =

Canadian professional wrestler (1930–1970)

Personal information
- Born: John Joseph Murphy; December 7, 1930 Hamilton, Ontario, Canada
- Died: March 23, 1970 (aged 39) Charlotte, North Carolina, U.S.
- Cause of death: Suicide

Professional wrestling career
- Ring name: Skull Murphy
- Billed height: 6 ft 1 in (1.85 m)
- Billed weight: 265 lb (120 kg)
- Billed from: Hamilton, Ontario; Ireland
- Trained by: Jimmy Simms
- Debut: 1952

John Joseph Murphy (December 7, 1930 – March 23, 1970) was a Canadian professional wrestler, better known by his ring name Skull Murphy. He began his career wrestling in Canada and later worked at Jim Crockett Promotions and Georgia Championship Wrestling in the United States. In the 1960s, he teamed with Brute Bernard in the World Wide Wrestling Federation and won championships in several professional wrestling promotions. In his later career, he worked primarily in Australia.

== Early life ==
John Joseph Murphy was raised in Hamilton, Ontario. As a child, he developed a disease that prevented him from growing any hair on his body. He attended Hamilton Central Technical School, where he met professional wrestler Chuck Molnar. Molnar convinced Murphy to become a wrestler, and Murphy began training at the Hamilton Jewish YMCA under Jimmy Simms. Author Mordecai Richler states that Murphy told him that he rubbed baby oil on his bald head before matches to reduce irritation from the ring floor.

== Career ==
=== Early career (1952–1961) ===
Murphy began competing in Welland, Ontario, as well as Larry Kasaboski's Northland Wrestling Enterprises in northeastern Ontario. He soon began competing for promotions on the east coast of the United States, including Jim Crockett Promotions, and was billed as living in Ireland. By 1959, Murphy was competing for Georgia Championship Wrestling (GCW), where he feuded with Dickie Gunkel. Professional boxer Joey Maxim was the referee for one match between Murphy and Gunkel. After Gunkel won, Murphy challenged Maxim to a "wrestler vs. boxer" match the following week, which Murphy won. He competed in GCW for several years and won five championships in 1961, which included three reigns with the Georgia version of the NWA Southern Heavyweight Championship. He also formed a tag team with Gypsy Joe and won both the NWA International Tag Team Championship and the NWA Southern Tag Team Championship.

=== Teaming with Brute Bernard (1961–1965) ===
In addition to singles competition, Murphy competed in a tag team with fellow Canadian Brute Bernard in the early 60s, having met in Detroit. During matches, they would take an autograph book handed out by a member of the audience and tear it into shreds. Competing together in the World Wide Wrestling Federation (WWWF), on May 16, 1963, they defeated Buddy Austin and Great Scott to capture the WWWF United States Tag Team Championship. Murphy and Bernard held onto the titles until being dethroned by Gorilla Monsoon and Killer Kowalski in November. They also wrestled for Championship Wrestling from Florida, winning the Florida version of the NWA World Tag Team Championship on two occasions in 1964. Murphy and Bernard then moved to World Championship Wrestling in Australia, where in 1966, they held the IWA World Tag Team Championship twice.

=== Australia and reunion with Bernard (1965–1970) ===
Murphy remained in Australia while Bernard returned to the United States; during this time, he had two reigns as IWA World Heavyweight Champion. He also formed a tag team with Killer Kowalski and won the IWA World Tag Team Championship twice more, defeating Red Bastien and Mario Milano for the title both times. Bernard later came back to Australia and reunited with Murphy, winning the tag team belts again. After this, the team returned to the United States, where they worked in Jim Crockett Promotions. While there, they wrestled as heels (villains) against other heel teams in an unusual series of matches. These "Battle of the Bullies" matches pitted them against such teams as the pairing of Swede Hanson and Rip Hawk or the Anderson Brothers (Gene and Ole).

The majority of Murphy's remaining career, however, was spent in Australia. In 1968, he had two more reigns as IWA World Tag Team Champion, pairing with Killer Karl Kox and Toru Tanaka. He also held the IWA World Heavyweight Championship again after winning the belt from Tex McKenzie on November 18, 1968. A few months prior in July, Murphy worked for All Japan Pro Wrestling in Japan, teaming with Klondike Bill to win the All Asia Tag Team Championship. His final title came on December 5, 1969, when he reunited with Bernard once again for his final reign with the IWA World Tag Team Championship.

== Death ==
On March 23, 1970, Murphy's wife found him dead in their apartment in Charlotte, North Carolina, having overdosed on sleeping pills in an apparent suicide; he was 39 years old and survived by two children. Early reports listed his cause of death as a heart attack. Murphy had been upset about his health, and on the day of his death, he and Bernard were set to face The Kentuckian and Mr. Wrestling.

== Legacy ==
Another wrestler billed as Skull Murphy wrestled for the Memphis-based Continental Wrestling Association, where he won the AWA Southern Tag Team Championship three times with Gypsy Joe Dorsetti in 1980 The team were managed by Jimmy Hart.

British wrestler Peter Northey (the son of wrestler Charles "Roy Bull Davies" Northey) also adopted the "Skull Murphy" name along with a shaven-headed image. This version of Murphy won the 1984 Grand Prix belt tournament on television and later held the British Light Heavyweight Championship in 1995, and also formed the Riot Squad tag team with Fit Finlay, together winning the 1982 World of Sport Top Tag Team Tournament.

== Championships and accomplishments ==
- Japan Pro Wrestling Alliance
  - All Asia Tag Team Championship (1 time) - with Klondike Bill
- Championship Wrestling from Florida
  - NWA World Tag Team Championship (Florida version) (2 times) - with Brute Bernard
- Georgia Championship Wrestling
  - NWA International Tag Team Championship (Georgia version) (1 time) - with Gypsy Joe
  - NWA Southern Heavyweight Championship (Georgia version) (3 times)
  - NWA Southern Tag Team Championship (Georgia version) (1 time) – with Gypsy Joe
- World Championship Wrestling (Australia)
  - IWA World Heavyweight Championship (3 times)
  - IWA World Tag Team Championship (9 times) - with Brute Bernard (5), Killer Kowalski (2), Killer Karl Kox (1), and Toru Tanaka (1)
- World Wide Wrestling Federation
  - WWWF United States Tag Team Championship (1 time) - with Brute Bernard

== See also ==
- List of premature professional wrestling deaths
