= Rip Hawk =

American professional wrestler (1930–2012)

Personal information
- Born: Harvey Maurice Evers; June 6, 1930 Indiana, U.S.
- Died: December 22, 2012 (aged 82)

Professional wrestling career
- Ring name: Rip Hawk
- Billed height: 5 ft 9 in (1.75 m)
- Billed weight: 240 lb (110 kg)
- Trained by: Karl Pojello
- Debut: 1949
- Retired: 1982

Harvey Maurice Evers (June 6, 1930 – December 22, 2012) was an American professional wrestler best known by his ring name, Rip Hawk. He began his wrestling career in the Mid-Western United States before joining Jim Crockett Promotions (JCP) in the early 1960s. In the company, he teamed with fellow wrestler Swede Hanson as the "Blond Bombers," and the duo held several championships. In the 1970s, he worked as a booker in JCP.

== Early life ==
Evers was born on June 6, 1930, in Indiana. He was raised in Ohio.

== Professional wrestling career ==
=== Early career ===
Hawk made his wrestling debut in 1949. He began as an amateur in Ohio and was discovered by professional boxer Jack Dempsey, who convinced him to wrestle professionally. His ring name came from a variety of sources: his sister called him "Rip" as a nickname, while a promoter gave him the last name "Hawk" due to his nose and his movements in the wrestling ring. His nickname, "The Profile", was taken from actor John Barrymore. He began wrestling professionally in Ohio around his 18th birthday, and later moved to Chicago, where he trained for a year with Karl Pojello. He also briefly wrestled in New York City.

Hawk was soon drafted to serve in the Korean War. He joined the United States Marine Corps and continued to wrestle during his service. He was discharged from the Marine Corps in 1954, believing he could make a better living from wrestling. He competed in several territories after returning to the United States, including Tennessee and Atlanta, Georgia, Iowa. He later moved to Missouri, where he competed in St. Joseph and St. Louis. In St. Joseph, he had a scripted feud with Sonny Myers and Larry Hamilton. He continued to move around and held his first championship, the NWA Rocky Mountain Heavyweight Championship, while wrestling for NWA Western States Sports in 1958.

=== Jim Crockett Promotions ===
Hawk moved to North Carolina in the early 1960s, where he began competing for Jim Crockett Promotions, an organization run by Jim Crockett Sr. that promoted events in the Carolinas. He met fellow wrestler Swede Hanson and approached Crockett about forming a tag team with Hanson. Crockett agreed to the idea, and Hawk and Hanson began competing as the "Blond Bombers", named after their matching blond hair and their strength in the ring. While competing in Australia, Hawk met manager Gary Hart. He approached Crockett and convinced him to bring Hart to the Carolinas to manage Hawk and Hanson.

The team competed as heels (villains) and was unique for wearing suits to their matches, as most wrestlers did not worry about dressing like professionals outside of the ring. They aroused anger from many spectators, some of whom threw acid or threatened the team with knives and guns. They also had a following among some fans, and a fan club was formed for them at one point. During interviews, Hawk spoke for the team while Hanson stood silently; Hawk occasionally insulted Hanson in the interviews, but Hanson did not respond. The team competed in the Carolinas and Virginia, as well as touring overseas in Australia, New Zealand, and Japan.

Hawk wrestled in other territories, including Texas, where he held the NWA Texas Heavyweight Championship and the Texas version of the NWA World Tag Team Championship (the latter while teaming with Rock Hunter). Nine of his championships came as a member of the Blond Bombers, however. Hawk and Hanson were booked in an angle to win their first title together, the Florida version of the NWA World Tag Team Championship, on August 3, 1965. They combined to hold the NWA Atlantic Coast Tag Team Championship on four occasions, which was the center of their feud with Johnny Weaver and George Becker. They were also booked to win the IWA World Tag Team Championship on a wrestling tour of Tasmania.

The Blond Bombers were involved in a series of unusual matches in Jim Crockett Promotions; they faced other heel tag teams, which was a rarity at the time because most promoters stuck to good versus evil storylines. They competed against such teams as Aldo Bogni and Bronko Lubich, Gene and Ole Anderson, and Skull Murphy and Brute Bernard. Hawk, along with Johnny Weaver, was also involved in booking, or scheduling, events in Jim Crockett Promotions, a task he took on in the early 1970s. He also collaborated with Johnny Ringo to design the National Wrestling Alliance logo.

In 1971, Hanson suffered a heart attack and had to take time off of wrestling. Hawk competed as a singles wrestler and feuded with the Brisco brothers (Jack and Jerry). During this rivalry, Hawk held the NWA Eastern States Heavyweight Championship four times. He was then paired with Ric Flair, who was billed as his nephew. On July 4, 1974, Hawk and Flair were booked the NWA Mid-Atlantic Tag Team Championship.

Hanson returned to wrestling but soon became a face (fan favorite) and feuded with Hawk. The former partners faced each other in tag team matches in which Hanson teamed with Tiger Conway Jr. and Hawk teamed with Flair. Eventually, the partners were dropped and the two faced each other in a series of singles matches. Hawk left Jim Crockett Promotions permanently in 1975 due to differences with booker George Scott.

=== Later career ===
Hawk then took on a new partner, Roger Kirby, with whom he held the NWA Florida Tag Team Championship twice over the next two years. Hawk and Hanson reunited as a tag team in Texas, where they competed for NWA Western States Sports. In 1976 and 1977, they were booked to win the NWA Western States Tag Team Championship three times. After their final title reign, Hanson left to wrestle elsewhere while Hawk continued to wrestle in Texas.

Hawk and Hanson were inducted into the NWA Legends Hall of Heroes in 2007. Hawk returned in 2008 to posthumously induct long-time rival and real-life friend Johnny Weaver.

== Personal life and death ==
After retiring from wrestling, he moved to Hereford, Texas, where he lived with his wife, Kitty. They have 2 daughters. He worked as a personal trainer and wrestling coach at the YMCA in Hereford until 2011. Several of his trainees went to the Junior Olympics and received athletic scholarships to college.

Evers died on December 22, 2012. He had suffered from cardiac problems prior to his death.

== Championships and accomplishments ==
- Cauliflower Alley Club
  - Men's Wrestling Award (2010)
- Championship Wrestling from Florida
  - NWA Florida Tag Team Championship (2 times) - with Roger Kirby
  - NWA World Tag Team Championship (Florida version) (1 time) - with Swede Hanson
- Mid-Atlantic Championship Wrestling
  - NWA Atlantic Coast Tag Team Championship (4 times) - with Swede Hanson
  - NWA Eastern States Heavyweight Championship (4 times)
  - NWA Mid-Atlantic Tag Team Championship (1 time) - with Ric Flair
  - NWA Southern Tag Team Championship (Mid-Atlantic version) (1 time) - with Swede Hanson
- NWA Western States Sports
  - NWA Rocky Mountain Heavyweight Championship (1 time)
  - NWA Western States Tag Team Championship (3 times) - with Swede Hanson
- Southwest Sports Inc.
  - NWA Texas Heavyweight Championship (1 time)
  - NWA World Tag Team Championship (1 time) - with Rock Hunter
- St. Louis Wrestling Hall of Fame
  - Class of 2014
- World Championship Wrestling (Australia)
  - IWA World Tag Team Championship (1 time) - with Swede Hanson
