= IWA World Tag Team Championship (Australia) =

Professional wrestling tag team championship

Details
- Promotion: World Championship Wrestling
- Date established: 1966
- Date retired: 1971
Statistics
- First champion(s): Larry Hennig and Harley Race
- Most reigns: Team: Brute Bernard and Skull Murphy (5); Individual: Mario Milano (10)

The IWA World Tag Team Championship was the top tag team professional wrestling title in the Australian World Championship Wrestling promotion from 1966 through 1971.

Although a part of WCW, the championship carried the IWA initials, for the International Wrestling Alliance, WCW's sanctioning body for its championships.

WCW joined the National Wrestling Alliance in August 1969, but still recognized this title as its world title. In 1971, the title was abandoned and the NWA Austra-Asian Tag Team Championship was established as WCW's new top tag team title.

37 different teams held the championship, combining for 50 individual title reigns.

== Title history ==
Wrestlers:	Times:	Date:	Location:	Notes:
Larry Hennig and Harley Race	1	June 1966	?	Awarded the title.
Dominic DeNucci and Mark Lewin	1	1 July 1966	Sydney	
Brute Bernard and Skull Murphy	1	15 July 1966	Sydney, New South Wales	
Mark Lewin (2) and Bearcat Wright	1	29 July 1966	Sydney	
Brute Bernard (2) and Skull Murphy (2)	2	August 1966	?	
The Flying Scots (George and Sandy Scott)	1	22 October 1966	Melbourne	
Art Nelson and Ray Stevens	1	19 November 1966	Melbourne	
The Flying Scots (George and Sandy Scott)	2	December 1966	Melbourne, Victoria	
Karl and Kurt Von Stroheim	1	June 1967	United States	Possibly fictitious title change.
Red Bastien and Mario Milano	1	28 July 1967	Sydney, New South Wales	
Killer Kowalski and Skull Murphy (3)	1	25 August 1967	Sydney, New South Wales	
Red Bastien (2) and Mario Milano (2)	2	September 1967	Melbourne, Victoria	
Killer Kowalski (2) and Skull Murphy (4)	2	6 October 1967	Sydney, New South Wales	
Red Bastien (3) and Mario Milano (3)	3	13 October 1967	Sydney, New South Wales	
Art Nelson (2) and Pat Patterson	1	25 December 1967	San Francisco, California	Possibly fictitious title change.
Mario Milano (4) and Billy White Wolf	1	February 1968	Perth, Western Australia	Took place no later than this date.
Brute Bernard (3) and Skull Murphy (5)	3	22 March 1968	Sydney	
Mario Milano (5) and Antonio Pugliese	1	April 1968	Adelaide, South Australia	
Killer Karl Kox and Skull Murphy (6)	1	May 1968	Brisbane, Queensland	
Dominic DeNucci (2) and Antonio Pugliese (2)	1	May 1968	?	
Killer Kowalski (3) and Bill Miller	1	June 1968	Adelaide, South Australia	
Dominic DeNucci (3) and Mario Milano (6)	1	July 1968	Adelaide, South Australia	Took place no later than this date.
Ciclón Negro and Baron Mikel Scicluna	1	6 July 1968	Sydney, New South Wales	
The Assassins (Jody Hamilton and Tom Renesto)	1	30 August 1968	Sydney, New South Wales	
The Flying Scots (George and Sandy Scott)	3	11 October 1968	Sydney, New South Wales	
Skull Murphy (7) and Toru Tanaka	1	November 1968	?	
Brute Bernard (4) and Skull Murphy (8)	4	January 1969	?	
Don Leo Jonathan and Antonio Pugliese (3)	1	21 February 1969	Sydney, New South Wales	
Mario Milano (7) and The Spoiler	1	7 March 1969	Sydney, New South Wales	
Don Leo Jonathan (2) and Antonio Pugliese (4)	2	March 1969	Melbourne, Victoria	
Mario Milano (8) and Waldo Von Erich	1	4 April 1969	Sydney, New South Wales	
The Spoiler (2) and Waldo Von Erich (2)	1	April 1969	?	Milano gave up his half of the title.
Tex McKenzie and Billy White Wolf (2)	1	25 April 1969	Sydney, New South Wales	
The Spoiler (3) and Waldo Von Erich (3)	2	24 May 1969	Sydney, New South Wales	
WCW joined the National Wrestling Alliance in August 1969.
Lars Anderson and Dick Murdoch	1	October 1969	?	Awarded the title.
Brute Bernard (5) and Skull Murphy (9)	5	5 December 1969	Sydney, New South Wales	
Spiros Arion and Mario Milano (9)	1	19 December 1969	Sydney, New South Wales	
Buddy Austin and King Curtis Iaukea	1	26 December 1969	Sydney, New South Wales	
Swede Hanson and Rip Hawk	1	April 1970	Hobart, Tasmania	Possibly fictitious title change.
Mark Lewin (3) and Antonio Pugliese (5)	1	15 May 1970	Sydney, New South Wales	
Von Steigers (Kurt and Karl Von Steiger)	1	19 June 1970	Sydney, New South Wales	
Spiros Arion (2) and Mark Lewin (4)	1	1970	?	
Von Steigers (Kurt and Karl Von Steiger)	2	1970	?	
Mark Lewin (5) and Mario Milano (10)	1	December 1970	?	
The Texas Outlaws (Dick Murdoch (2) and Dusty Rhodes)	1	21 January 1971	Sydney, New South Wales	
Killer Kowalski (4) and Mark Lewin (6)	1	March 1971	?	Took place no later than this date.
King Curtis Iaukea (2) and Mark Lewin (7)	1	April 1971	?	Defeated Bob Brown and Killer Kowalski.
Mr. Fuji and Tiger Jeet Singh	1	May 1971	?	Took place no later than this date.
King Curtis Iaukea (3) and Mark Lewin (8)	2	June 1971	?	Took place no later than this date.
Von Steigers (Kurt and Karl Von Steiger)	3	August 1971	?	
The title was retired in 1971 and replaced with the NWA Austra-Asian Tag Team Championship.

== See also ==
- Professional wrestling in Australia
- World Championship Wrestling
