= Johnny Weaver =

American professional wrestler (1935–2008)

Personal information
- Born: Kenneth Eugene Weaver; November 17, 1935 East Saint Louis, Illinois, U.S.
- Died: February 15, 2008 (aged 72) Charlotte, North Carolina, U.S.

Professional wrestling career
- Ring name(s): Johnny Weaver; The Grappler; Ultimate Assassin
- Billed height: 6 ft 1 in (185 cm)
- Billed weight: 233 lb (106 kg)
- Billed from: Indianapolis, Indiana
- Debut: 1957
- Retired: 1987

Kenneth Eugene Weaver (November 17, 1935 – February 15, 2008) was an American professional wrestler and wrestling commentator in the National Wrestling Alliance, better known by his ring name, Johnny Weaver.

== Career ==
=== 1960s ===
Weaver's career spanned four decades in many different territories in the NWA. He held championships across the southeast United States, the first of which was the Mid-Atlantic (Carolinas, Virginia) version of the NWA Southern Tag Team Championship, which he won with “Cowboy” Bob Ellis on December 2, 1963. His best known run was with partner George Becker in the Mid-Atlantic in the 1960s. The two held the NWA Mid-Atlantic Southern Tag Team Championship five times together, and they were household names in the territory for a period of nearly eight years. The team had memorable feuds with Rip Hawk and Swede Hanson, Lars Anderson and Gene Anderson, Aldo Bogni and Bronko Lubich with manager "Colonel" Homer O'Dell, the Infernos with manager J. C. Dykes, and many others.

Weaver's next major success came in Championship Wrestling from Florida, where he teamed with Becker to win the Florida version of the NWA Southern Tag Team Championship in February 1967. He also competed as a singles wrestler, winning his first NWA Florida Southern Heavyweight Championship that year by defeating the Missouri Mauler. He dropped it back to the Mauler but regained the belt on October 25, 1967. The following summer, he won the belt for a third time. He lost the belt to Hiro Matsuda but then regained it in a rematch in late 1968.

=== 1970s ===
Returning to the Carolinas, Weaver was a successful tag team wrestler in Mid-Atlantic Championship Wrestling. He teamed with Becker to win the NWA Mid-Atlantic Tag Team Championship on May 1, 1969. They held the belts for over nine months before dropping them to Rip Hawk and Swede Hanson on February 17, 1970. Weaver and Becker regained the title exactly one month later, however. They lost the belts to Gene and Ole Anderson but regained them on June 3, 1971, from Hawk and Hanson. Once again, Weaver and Becker dropped the titles to Hawk and Hanson but regained them in a rematch. The following year, Weaver teamed with Art Neilson to win the title twice more.

Weaver returned to Florida to compete in 1975 and won the NWA Florida Tag Team Championship by teaming with Dick Slater. He also competed in Texas, where he won the Amarillo version of the NWA International Heavyweight Championship in November 1976.

After a brief absence from the Mid-Atlantic territory in 1975, he returned for one more main event run in 1978 with Baron Von Raschke for the area's Television championship.

=== 1980s ===
Weaver's final championship reigns came in 1981 while wrestling in the Mid-Atlantic area. He teamed with Dewey Robertson to win the NWA Mid-Atlantic Tag Team Championship in 1981 by defeating Genichiro Tenryu and Mr. Fuji. They lost the belts to Chris Markoff and Nikolai Volkoff later that year, but Weaver regained the title on November 27, 1981, while teaming with Jay Youngblood. Weaver also worked as a booker while Mid Atlantic was partnered with Frank Tunney's Maple Leaf Wrestling in Toronto and briefly held the North American title during a feud with Leo Burke Leonce Cormier.

Weaver's last years in the ring were in an "elder statesman" role, helping establish new stars just entering the territory, most notably Roddy Piper. He also helped book the Mid-Atlantic territory for nearly 8 years as well, roughly between 1966 and 1973. In the early 1980s, Weaver also booked the house shows in the southern part of the territory.

Weaver began his broadcasting career in 1979 as color commentator with World Wide Wrestling host Rich Landrum. He became Landrum's permanent sidekick for the early 1980s, where he became famous for singing "Turn out the lights, the party's over" at the end of matches that face wrestlers won (a nod to Don Meredith, who did the same thing on Monday Night Football near the end of games). When Landrum left the company in 1983, Weaver then worked briefly with David Crockett, wrestling in a tag team match at Starrcade '83, before becoming paired with the longtime voice of Mid-Atlantic Wrestling Bob Caudle; whom he worked with until leaving the company in 1988.

For a period of time in the early 1980s, there was a string of recurring angles in which Weaver would get into ringside verbal confrontations with heel wrestlers or their managers. These confrontations always ended with Weaver slapping the wrestler or manager across the face, to the delight of the fans in the studio. Recipients of these slaps have included Roddy Piper, Lord Alfred Hayes, and Kevin Sullivan.

Weaver made a brief in-ring return in late 1987 in the corner of the "American Dream" Dusty Rhodes who was using a sleeper hold, calling it the "Weaver lock", and chasing down Lex Luger and the N.W.A. United States Title. During this angle, Weaver was placed in a Japanese version of the sleeper by Hiro Matsuda, causing him to bleed from the mouth. Weaver was in Rhodes' corner at Starrcade '87: Chi-Town Heat, when Rhodes defeated Luger in a steel cage after DDTing Luger onto a steel chair.

=== Legacy ===
CWF Mid-Atlantic out of Burlington, North Carolina promotes the Johnny Weaver Cup tournament every summer, culminating in Weaver Cup Finals Night every August. Mr. Weaver was a special guest in attendance to present the trophy to the tournament winner at every Finals Night until his death in 2008. Since then a former tournament winner usually presents the trophy, often accompanied by surviving members of Mr. Weaver's family. Past tournament winners have been "Dangerous E" Corey Edsel (2004), Jesse Ortega (2005), Gemini Kid (2006), "Handsome" Mitch Connor (2007), Brass Munkey (2008), Kamakazi Kid (2009), "The 1st" Ric Converse (2010), Arik Royal (2011, 2012) and Trevor Lee (2013)

== Personal life ==
Weaver was a deputy sheriff with Mecklenburg County, North Carolina. In his 50s, Weaver became one of the oldest people to take the basic law enforcement test and ultimately joined the sheriff's office. He spent most of his nineteen-year career transporting prisoners on the same back roads he had traveled as a wrestler and promoter.

Weaver died of natural causes on February 15, 2008, aged 72.

== Championships and accomplishments ==
- American Wrestling Alliance
  - AWA Indiana World Tag Team Championship (1 time) - with Sonny Weaver
- Championship Wrestling from Florida
  - NWA Florida Tag Team Championship (1 time) - with Dick Slater (1)
  - NWA Southern Heavyweight Championship (Florida version) (4 times)
  - NWA Southern Tag Team Championship (Florida version) (1 time) - with George Becker
- Mid-Atlantic Championship Wrestling
  - NWA Atlantic Coast Tag Team Championship (6 times) - with George Becker (4) and Art Nielson (2)
  - NWA Mid-Atlantic Tag Team Championship (2 times) - with Dewey Robertson (1) and Jay Youngblood (1)
  - NWA Southern Heavyweight Championship/NWA Eastern States Heavyweight Championship (3 times)
  - NWA Southern Tag Team Championship (Mid-Atlantic version) (8 times) - with “Cowboy” Bob Ellis (1) and George Becker (7)
  - NWA Television Championship (1 time)
- NWA Western States Sports
  - NWA International Heavyweight Championship (Amarillo version) (1 time)
