= NWA Western States Tag Team Championship =

Professional wrestling tag team championship

NWA International Tag Team Championship
- The third Vendetta Pro Wrestling Tag Team Championship belt, which represented the NWA Western States Tag Team Championship, now the NWA International Tag Team Championship

Details
- Promotion: Western States Sports, 1969-1981, Vendetta Pro Wrestling, 2014-2017; World Wonder Ring Stardom, 2016
- Date established: 1969
Statistics
- First champions: Mr. Ito and Chati Yokouchi
- Most reigns: As a Tag Team – The Gladiator and Mr. Wrestling, Rip Hawk and Swede Hanson (3 reigns); As Individual – Ricky Romero (11 reigns)

The NWA International Tag Team Championship is a professional wrestling title, originally created as the NWA Western States Tag Team Championship in the National Wrestling Alliance's Amarillo, Texas territory, Western States Sports. The title was in use from 1969, when it replaced Amarillo's version of the NWA North American Tag Team Championship, through the promotion's 1981 closure. The title was revived on July 15, 2014, by Vendetta Pro Wrestling when they joined the NWA. The Vendetta Pro Wrestling Tag Team Champions at the time, Shane and Shannon Ballard, were recognized as the NWA Western States Tag Team Champions, and since then, the Vendetta Pro Wrestling Tag Team title belts have represented the NWA Western States Tag Team Championship.

On September 30, 2016, The Twisted Sisterz (the team of Holidead and Thunder Rosa) defeated Alexander G. Bernard and Jimi Mayhem for the title to become the first team of women to win the NWA Western States Tag Team Championship.

On October 19, 2016, Vendetta Pro Wrestling awarded temporary, provisional control of the title to joshi puroresu promotion World Wonder Ring Stardom, while the reigning champions were on tour there. The Twisted Sisterz successfully defended the title at Stardom's December 22 Korakuen Hall show.

On December 30, 2016, NWA Director of Operations James Beard announced that the title controlled by Vendetta Pro Wrestling had been renamed the NWA International Tag Team Championship following a title defense in Japan.

As of October 1, 2017, Vendetta Pro Wrestling is no longer directly associated with the NWA following the takeover of Billy Corgan. As such, the 'NWA' International Tag Team Championship is vacated and deactivated. Billy Blade and Richie Slade retained the 'Vendetta Pro Wrestling' International Tag Team Championship.

== Names ==
Name	Years
NWA Western States Tag Team Championship	1969 – December 30, 2016
NWA International Tag Team Championship	December 30, 2016 – present

== Title history (1969-1981) ==
Silver areas in the history indicate periods of unknown lineage. An (n) indicates that a title changes occurred no later than the listed date.

Wrestlers:	Times:	Date:	Location:	Notes:
Mr. Ito and Chati Yokouchi	1	December 4, 1968	Lubbock, Texas	Defeat Dory Funk Jr. and Terry Funk for the World Title; billed as Western States Title after April 1968.
Buddy Colt and Gorgeous George, Jr.	1	June 8, 1969	Albuquerque, New Mexico	
Nick Kozak and Ricky Romero	1	July 23, 1969	Lubbock, Texas	
Buddy Colt and Gorgeous George Jr.	2	July 31, 1969	Amarillo, Texas	
Art Nelson and Kurt Von Brauner	1	August 20, 1969	Lubbock, Texas	
Terry Funk and The Lawman (Don Slatton)	1	October 6, 1969	Abilene, Texas	
Art Nelson and Kurt Von Brauner	2	October 13, 1969	Lubbock, Texas	
Terry Funk ^{(2)} and Ricky Romero ^{(2)}	1	October 21, 1969	Odessa, Texas	
The Beast and Bull Ramos	1	April 4, 1970	Amarillo, Texas	Vacant sometime after May 21, 1975 when the team splits.
Kim II and Pak Song	1	June 17, 1970	Lubbock, Texas	Defeat Rufus R. Jones and Gorgeous George Jr.
Terry Funk ^{(3)} and Ricky Romero ^{(3)}	2	June 24, 1970	Lubbock, Texas	
The Gladiator and Mr. Wrestling (Gordon Nelson)	1	August 20, 1970	Amarillo, Texas	
The Kozak Brothers (Jerry and Nick ^{(2)})	1	October 26, 1970	Abilene, Texas	
The Gladiator and Mr. Wrestling	2	December 10, 1970 (n)	Hobbs, New Mexico	Sometime after November 2, 1970.
The Kozak Brothers (Jerry ^{(2)} and Nick ^{(3)})	2	January 4, 1971	El Paso, Texas	
The Gladiator and Mr. Wrestling	3	January 13, 1971	Lubbock, Texas	
The Beast ^{(2)} and The Butcher	1	January 21, 1971	Amarillo, Texas	
Bobby Duncum, Sr. and Woody Farmer	1	April 8, 1971	Amarillo, Texas	Defeated The Beast and Bulldog Brower.
The Continental Warriors (Bobby Hart and Lorenzo Parente)	1	May 27, 1971	Amarillo, Texas	
Nick Kozak ^{(4)} and Ricky Romero ^{(4)}	2	June 22, 1971	Odessa, Texas	May win the title defeating the Warriors only for a local recognition.
The Infernos (Frankie Cain and Rocky Smith)	1	August 4, 1971	Lubbock, Texas	
The Continental Warriors (Bobby Hart and Lorenzo Parente)	2	August 11, 1971	Lubbock, Texas	
Eric Rommel and Mr. Wrestling ^{(4)}	1	November 11, 1971	Hobbs, New Mexico	
Masio Koma and Mr. Okuma	1	November 25, 1971	Amarillo, Texas	
Ricky Romero ^{(5)} and Lord Alfred Hayes	1	April 10, 1972	El Paso, Texas	
Masio Koma and Mr. Okuma	2	May 14, 1972 (n)		
Bobby Duncum, Sr. ^{(2)} and Dick Murdoch	1	July 9, 1972	Clovis, New Mexico	
Lord Alfred Hayes ^{(2)} and Ricki Starr	1	August 24, 1972	Amarillo, Texas	
Karl Von Steiger and Hans Mueller	1	September 28, 1972	Amarillo, Texas	
Nick Kozak ^{(5)} and Moose Morowski	1	October 23, 1972	El Paso, Texas	
Ciclón Negro and Karl Von Steiger ^{(2)}	1	November 20, 1972	El Paso, Texas	
Lord Alfred Hayes ^{(3)} and Nick Kozak ^{(6)}	1	November 27, 1972	El Paso, Texas	
Don and Johnny Fargo	1	February 8, 1973	Amarillo, Texas	
Moose Morowski ^{(2)} and Ricky Romero ^{(6)}	1	May 10, 1973	Amarillo, Texas	Morowski and Nick Kozak are billed as champions in El Paso, TX on May 14, 1973 and May 21, 1973.
Black Gordman and Goliath	1	June 18, 1973	El Paso, Texas	
Moose Morowski ^{(3)} and Ricky Romero ^{(7)}	2	July 2, 1973	El Paso, Texas	
Hank James and Buck Robley	1	July 4, 1973	Lubbock, Texas	Still champions as of August 3, 1973.
Karl Von Steiger ^{(3)} and The Patriot	1	September 21, 1973	Abilene, Texas	Defeat The Lawman and Dick Murdoch and Tomomi Tsuruta and Nick Kozak in a 3-team tournament.
Jerry Kozak ^{(3)} and Les Thornton	1	October 5, 1973	Abilene, Texas	
Don Fargo ^{(2)} and Hank James ^{(2)}	1	November 8, 1973 (n)		
The Beast ^{(3)} and Leo Burke	1	January 10, 1974	Amarillo, Texas	
Dory Funk, Jr. and Ricky Romero ^{(8)}	1	February 25, 1974	El Paso, Texas	
Siegfried Steinke and Karl Von Steiger ^{(4)}	1	September 9, 1974	El Paso, Texas	
Dory Funk, Jr. ^{(2)} and Ricky Romero ^{(9)}	2	September 16, 1974	El Paso, Texas	
The Interns (Tom Andrews and Jim Starr)	1	June 26, 1975	Amarillo, Texas	
Johnny Starr and Scott Casey	1	July 11, 1975	Abilene, Texas	
The Interns (Tom Andrews and Jim Starr)	2	July 22, 1975 (n)		
Ray Candy and Dory Funk, Jr. ^{(3)}	1	August 20, 1975	Lubbock, Texas	
Title vacated sometime after October 15, 1975.
The Beast ^{(4)} and Leo Burke ^{(3)}	2	February 20, 1976	Lubbock, Texas	Defeated Ricky Romero and Silver Streak in a tournament final.
Ricky Romero ^{(10)} and Silver Streak	1	February 27, 1976	Lubbock, Texas	
Bobby Jaggers and Randy Tyler	1	April 16, 1976	Lubbock, Texas	
Scott Casey ^{(2)} and Reggie Parks	1	May 12, 1976	Abilene, Texas	
Davey O'Hannon and Dennis Stamp	1	June 11, 1976	Lubbock, Texas	
Abe Jacobs and Pez Whatley	1	July 8, 1976	Amarillo, Texas	
Rip Hawk and Swede Hanson	1	July 16, 1976	Lubbock, Texas	
Abe Jacobs and Pez Whatley	2	July 22, 1976	Amarillo, TX	Title vacated by The NWA president Eddie Graham in October 1976 when Hawk is suspended for 30 days.
Al Perez and Dennis Stamp ^{(2)}	1	November 18, 1976 (n)		
Rip Hawk and Swede Hanson	2	December 9, 1976	Amarillo, Texas	
Dory Funk, Jr. ^{(4)} and The Super Destroyer	1	February 10, 1977	Amarillo, Texas	
Rip Hawk and Swede Hanson	3	April 1977 (n)		
Dory Funk, Jr. ^{(5)} and The Super Destroyer ^{(2)}	2	May 27, 1977 (n)		
Ted DiBiase and Ervin Smith	1	July 1977 (n)		Held up after a match against Brute Bernard and Frank Morrell on December 1, in Amarillo, Texas.
Brute Bernard and Frank Morrell	1	December 15, 1977	Amarillo, Texas	Win the rematch.
Dory Funk, Jr. ^{(6)} and Larry Lane	1	February 2, 1978	Amarillo, Texas	
Roger Kirby and Doug Somers	1	September 28, 1978	Amarillo, Texas	
Blackjack Mulligan and Dick Murdoch ^{(2)}	1	October 31, 1978	Odessa, Texas	
Roger Kirby and Doug Somers	2	November 2, 1978	Amarillo, Texas	
Blackjack Mulligan ^{(2)} and Dick Murdoch ^{(3)}	2	November 3, 1978	Lubbock, Texas	
Mr. Pogo and Mr. Sato	1	November 30, 1978	Amarillo, Texas	
Ted DiBiase ^{(2)} and Merced Solis	1	February 8, 1979	Amarillo, Texas	
Mr. Pogo and Mr. Sato	2	February 15, 1979	Amarillo, Texas	
Ricky Romero ^{(11)} and Akihisa Takachiho	1	April 22, 1979	Albuquerque, New Mexico	Fictitious title change.
Mr. Sato ^{(3)} and John Tolos	1	May 3, 1979	Amarillo, Texas	
Title vacated in June 1979 when Tolos left the area.
Mr. Kiyomoto ^{(2)} and Mr. Sato ^{(4)}	1	June 14, 1979	Amarillo, Texas	Defeated Dory Funk, Jr. and Larry Lane in a tournament final. Kiyomoto previously held the title as Akihisa Takachiho.
Ati Tago and Reno Tuu Fuli	1	July 21, 1979	Amarillo, Texas	
The Von Erichs (Kevin and David)	1	August 8, 1979	Lubbock, Texas	
Gino Caruso and Gary Young	1	December 5, 1979 (n)	Houston, Texas	
Tim Brooks and Gypsy Joe	1	December 15, 1979	Amarillo, Texas	Title vacated in January 1980 when Joe refuses to wrestle at the Amarillo Sports Arena, claiming that "the wrestlers do not receive enough protection.
Gary Young and Gino Caruso	2	January 10, 1980	Amarillo, Texas	Defeat Tim Brooks and Jim Dillon.
Mitsu Ishikawa and Hugo Savinovich	1	March 20, 1980	Amarillo, Texas	
Mitsu Ishikawa ^{(2)} and Haru Sonoda	1	April 1980 (n)	Amarillo, Texas	
Ted Heath and Larry Lane ^{(2)}	1	1980 (n)		
Title retired in 1981 when the promotion closed.

== Title history (since 2014) ==
Wrestlers:	Times:	Date:	Location:	Notes:
Vendetta Pro Wrestling Tag Team Championship
The Ballard Brothers (Shane and Shannon)	1	July 15, 2014	Santa Maria, California	Title revived with Vendetta Pro Wrestling to joining the NWA and The Ballard Brothers recognized as the Western States Tag Champions upon Vendetta Pro joining the NWA.
SU/KA (Sunami and Kadin Anthony)	1	August 2, 2014	Santa Maria, California	Defeated Ballard Brothers in a Tag Team Steel Cage Match.
Championships stripped from SU/KA by Vendetta Pro Commissioner Joseph Duncan due to Kadin Anthony being unable appear.
Parental Discretion (Mike Menace, Mario Banks and Mike Rayne)	1	September 12, 2014	Santa Maria, California	Already scheduled to face The Ballard Brothers in a #1 Contendership match, the match was made to be for the vacant Tag titles. Parental Discretion have elected to use the “Freebird Rule”, allowing any two members of the team to defend the titles.
The Ballard Brothers (Shane and Shannon)	2	May 16, 2015 (Interim); June 12, 2015 (Undisputed)	Lompoc, California	On May 16, 2015 in Lompoc, California; The Ballard Brothers won a four-way Tag Team match to become the Interim NWA Western States Tag Team Champions, while Parental Discretion would continue to hold the Vendetta Pro Wrestling Tag Team title. On June 12, 2015, The Ballard Brothers would defeat Parental Discretion members Mike Menace and Mike Rayne to become undisputed NWA Western States Tag Team Champions by capturing their Vendetta Pro Tag Team titles, and thus, having the "Interim" tag removed. Although their second NWA Western States Tag Team title, this was the third title for The Ballards in Vendetta Pro.
The Classic Connection (Buddy Royal and Levi Shapiro)	1	August 8, 2015	Santa Maria, California	Won the NWA Western States Tag Team title along with the Apex Pro Tag Team title in a Tag Team Triangle Tag match, defeating The Ballards and The Von Dooms. The Classic Connection put up their APW Universal Tag Team title, PCW Tag Team title, and FCW-LA Tag Team title, retaining all three.
The Von Dooms (Vintage Dragon and Cyanide Von Doom)	1	January 8, 2016	Santa Maria, California	Defeated The Classic Connection, The Midnight Delight and The Ballard Brothers in a Four Corners Tag Team Match.
Alexander G. Bernard and Jimi Mayhem	1	July 29, 2016	Santa Maria, California	Defeated The Ballard Brothers, The Twisted Sisterz and the team of Vintage Dragon and Espiritu (who filled in for an injured Cyanide Von Doom) in a Four Corners Tag Team Match.
The Twisted Sisterz (Holidead and Thunder Rosa)	1	September 30, 2016	Santa Maria, California	Defeated Alexander G. Bernard and Jimi Mayhem to become the first pair of women to win the NWA Western States Tag Team Championship. Title renamed the NWA International Tag Team Championship on December 30, 2016
Vacant		February 13, 2017	Brownsville, Texas	On January 6, 2017, The Ballard Brothers (Shane and Shannon Ballard) defeated The Twisted Sisterz with a fast count performed by Vendetta Pro Wrestling Commissioner Joseph Duncan. On February 13, NWA announced it would not recognize The Ballard Brothers as champions and held the title up.
The Ballard Brothers (Shane and Shannon)	3	February 24, 2017	Santa Maria, California	Defeated The Twisted Sisterz in a rematch for the held up titles.
The Midnight Delight (Billy Blade and Richie Slade)	3	May 1, 2017	Las Vegas, Nevada	
Vacant		October 1, 2017		Following the takeover of the National Wrestling Alliance by Billy Corgan, all NWA Sanctioned Championships controlled by Vendetta Pro Wrestling are vacant and deactivated. Billy Blade and Richie Slade retain the Vendetta Pro Wrestling International Tag Team Championship.
Title Deactivated

== See also ==
- List of National Wrestling Alliance championships
- NWA North American Tag Team Championship
- NWA Western States Heavyweight Championship
- NWA International Tag Team Championship
