= NWA Mid-Atlantic Tag Team Championship =

Professional wrestling tag team championship

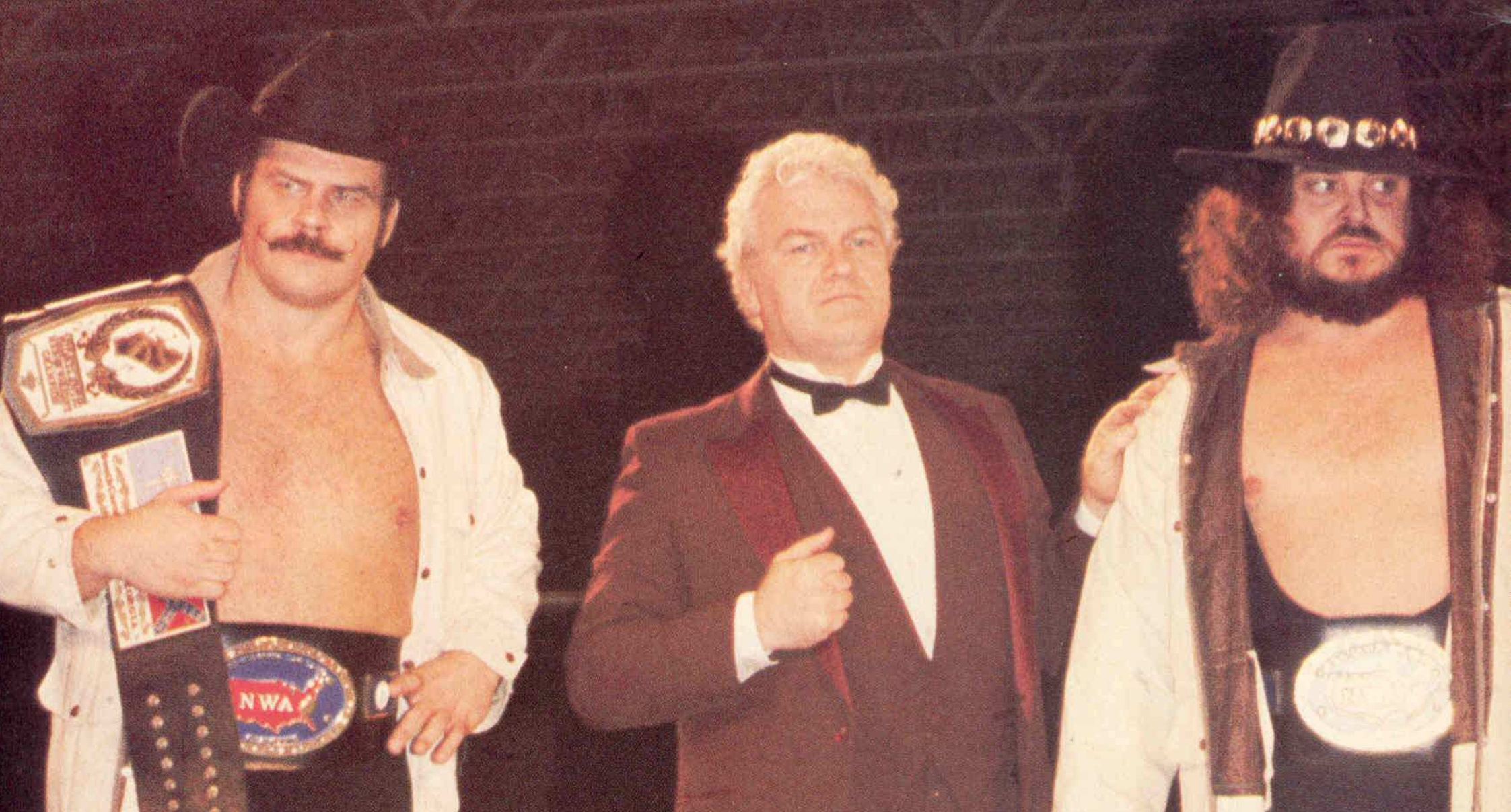
- The Texas Long Riders - Ron Bass (left) and Black Bart (right) - as NWA Mid-Atlantic Tag Team Champions, c. 1985. Bass also holds the NWA Mid-Atlantic Heavyweight Championship.

Details
- Promotion: NWA Mid-Atlantic
- Date established: June 1968
- Current champion: Vacant
- Date won: April 10, 2017

Other name
- NWA Atlantic Coast Tag Team Championship
Statistics
- First champions: Rip Hawk and Swede Hanson
- Most reigns: As a team: Minnesota Wrecking Crew (Ole and Gene Anderson (6 reigns); As an individual: Johnny Weaver (8 reigns)
- Longest reign: Triple X (Drake Dawson and Curtis Thompson) (366 days)
- Shortest reign: Rip Hawk and Swede Hanson (2 days)

The NWA Mid-Atlantic Tag Team Championship was a tag team title defended in the National Wrestling Alliance's NWA Mid-Atlantic territory. The championship was originally created in the summer of 1968 and was originally named the NWA Atlantic Coast Tag Team Championship. During this time, the title was the primary tag team championship that was defended in Mid-Atlantic Championship Wrestling owned by Jim Crockett, Sr. and later by his son, Jim Crockett, Jr. While the current Mid-Atlantic promotion operates primarily out of the same area as the Crockett promotion, they aren't the same, as Jim Crockett, Jr. sold his territory to Ted Turner in November 1988. This promotion would then be renamed World Championship Wrestling. The title was relegated to serve as the secondary tag team championship in Crockett's territory after Mid-Atlantic created its own territorial version of the NWA World Tag Team Championship in January 1975 and was used until sometime in 1985 when it was abandoned. In 2000, the title was revived for the Mid-Atlantic territory.

== Title history ==
Key
No.	Overall reign number
Reign	Reign number for the specific champion
Days	Number of days held

No.	Champion	Championship change			Reign statistics		Notes	Ref.
No.	Champion	Date	Event	Location	Reign	Days	Notes	Ref.
NWA Atlantic Coast Tag Team Championship
1	Rip Hawk and Swede Hanson	June 2, 1968	MACW show	Washington, DC	1	N/A	Title Awarded and defeat Édouard Carpentier and Miguel Perez in a fictitious match.	
2	Johnny Weaver and George Becker	May 1, 1969	MACW show	Winston-Salem, North Carolina	1	292		
3	Rip Hawk and Swede Hanson	February 17, 1970	MACW show	Raleigh, North Carolina	2	28		
4	Johnny Weaver and George Becker	March 17, 1970	MACW show	Raleigh, North Carolina	2	9		
5	The Andersons (Gene and Ole Anderson)	March 26, 1970	MACW show	Greensboro, North Carolina	1	180		
6	Paul Jones and Nelson Royal	September 22, 1970	MACW show	Raleigh, North Carolina	1	78		
7	Rip Hawk and Swede Hanson	December 9, 1970	MACW show	Raleigh, North Carolina	3	176		
8	Johnny Weaver and George Becker	June 3, 1971	MACW show	Greensboro, North Carolina	3	114		
9	Rip Hawk and Swede Hanson	September 25, 1971	MACW show	Hampton, Virginia	4	2		
10	Johnny Weaver and George Becker	September 27, 1971	MACW show	Fayetteville, North Carolina	4	15		
11	Larry Hamilton and Brute Bernard	October 12, 1971	MACW show	Raleigh, North Carolina	1	171		
12	Johnny Weaver (5) and Art Neilson	March 31, 1972	MACW show	Greensboro, North Carolina	1	220		
13	The Andersons (Gene and Ole Anderson)	November 6, 1972	MACW show	Charlotte, North Carolina	2	7		
14	Johnny Weaver (6) and Art Neilson (2)	November 13, 1972	MACW show	Charlotte, North Carolina	2	110		
15	The Andersons (Gene and Ole Anderson)	March 3, 1973	MACW show	Winston-Salem, North Carolina	3	87		
16	Jerry Brisco and Thunderbolt Patterson	May 29, 1973	MACW show	High Point, North Carolina	1	37		
17	The Andersons (Gene and Ole Anderson)	July 5, 1973	MACW show	Greensboro, North Carolina	4	89		
18	Sandy Scott and Nelson Royal (2)	October 2, 1973	MACW show	Raleigh, North Carolina	1	N/A		
NWA Mid-Atlantic Tag Team Championship
19	Brute Bernard and Jay York	November 26, 1973	MACW show	Raleigh, North Carolina	1	30	Brute and York managed by Beauregarde.	
20	The Andersons (Gene and Ole Anderson)	December 26, 1973	MACW show	Columbia, South Carolina	5	103		
21	Paul Jones (2) and Bob Bruggers	April 8, 1974	MACW show	Fayetteville, North Carolina	1	87		
22	Rip Hawk (5) and Ric Flair	July 4, 1974	MACW show	Greensboro, North Carolina	1	155		
23	Paul Jones (3) and Tiger Conway Jr.	December 6, 1974	MACW show	Charleston, South Carolina	1	76	Defeat Flair and Brute Bernard, subbing for Hawk.	
24	The Andersons (Gene and Ole Anderson)	February 20, 1975	MACW show	Greensboro, North Carolina	6	0	Won the title vs. title match.	
—		February 20, 1975	—	—			The Andersons are the reigning NWA World Tag Team Champions (Mid-Atlantic version) and title is inactive until September 22, 1976 when the tournament to crown new champions starts.	
25	Dino Bravo and Tim Woods	November 3, 1976	MACW show	Raleigh, North Carolina	1	75	Defeat Sgt. Jacques Goulet and Mike "The Judge" DuBois in tournament final.	
26	The Hollywood Blonds (Buddy Roberts and Jerry Brown)	January 17, 1977	MACW show	Greenville, South Carolina	1	83		
27	Dino Bravo (2) and Tiger Conway, Jr. (2)	April 10, 1977	MACW show	Charlotte, North Carolina	1	87		
28	Greg Valentine and Ric Flair (2)	July 6, 1977	MACW show	Anderson, South Carolina	1	47	Awarded.	
29	Paul Jones (4) and Ricky Steamboat	August 22, 1977	MACW show	Greensboro, North Carolina	1	434	Steamboat and Jones win NWA World Tag Team Champions (Mid-Atlantic version) on April 23, 1978 and hold the titles concurrently.	
30	Ric Flair (3) and Big John Studd	October 30, 1978	MACW show	Greenville, South Carolina	1	6		
31	Paul Jones (5) and Ricky Steamboat (2)	November 5, 1978	MACW show	Greensboro, North Carolina	2	N/A		
32	Big John Studd (2) and Ken Patera	January 2, 1979	MACW show	N/A	1	N/A		
33	Paul Jones (6) and Ricky Steamboat (3)	April 26, 1979	MACW show	N/A	3	N/A		
—	Vacated	August 8, 1979	—	—	—	—	When Jones turns on Steamboat.	
34	Ricky Steamboat (4) and Dino Bravo (3)	October 20, 1979	MACW show	N/A	1	N/A	Bravo is actually wrestling in the AWA at this time.	
35	Masked Superstar and Masked Superstar 2 (3)	March 26, 1980	MACW show	N/A	1	N/A		
—	Vacated	April 30, 1980	—	—	—	—	When Masked Superstar #2 is unmasked and leaves the area.	
36	Matt Borne and Buzz Sawyer	June 2, 1980	MACW show	Greenville, South Carolina	1	118	Defeat The Iron Sheik and Jimmy Snuka in tournament final.	
37	The Sheepherders (Butch Miller and Luke Williams)	September 28, 1980	MACW show	Charlotte, North Carolina	1	75		
38	Dewey Robertson and George Wells	December 12, 1980	MACW show	Richmond, Virginia	1	57		
39	Genichiro Tenryu and Mr. Fuji	February 7, 1981	MACW show	Greensboro, North Carolina	1	N/A		
40	Dewey Robertson and Johnny Weaver (7)	May 25, 1981	MACW show	N/A	1	N/A		
41	The Imperial Russians (Chris Markoff and Nikolai Volkoff)	June 27, 1981	MACW show	Charlotte, North Carolina	1	153		
42	Jay Youngblood and Johnny Weaver (8)	November 27, 1981	MACW show	Appalachia, Virginia	1	N/A		
43	Ox Baker and Carl Fergie	December 2, 1981	MACW show	N/A	1	N/A		
44	Jay Youngblood (2) and Porkchop Cash	January 29, 1982	MACW show	Charleston, South Carolina	1	N/A		
45	Don Kernodle and Pvt. Jim Nelson	May 22, 1982	MACW show	N/A	1	N/A		
46	Porkchop Cash (2) and Iceman Parsons	June 1, 1982	MACW show	N/A	1	16		
47	Don Kernodle and Jim Nelson	June 17, 1982	MACW show	Roanoke, Virginia	2	66		
48	Ricky Steamboat (5) and Jay Youngblood (3)	August 22, 1982	MACW show	Toronto	1	202		
—	Vacated	March 12, 1983	—	—	—	—	Upon winning the NWA World Tag Team Championship.	
49	One Man Gang and Kelly Kiniski	May 23, 1983	MACW show	Greenville, South Carolina	1	58	Defeat Mike Rotunda and Rufus R. Jones in tournament final.	
50	Rufus R. Jones and Bugsy McGraw	July 20, 1983	MACW show	Emporia, Virginia	1	N/A		
—	Vacated	August 2, 1983	—	—	—	—		
51	Long Riders (Ron Bass and Black Bart)	August 25, 1984	MACW show	N/A	1	N/A		
		March 23, 1985	N/A	N/A				
NWA MACW Tag Team Championship
52	Triple X (Drake Dawson and Curtis Thompson)	September 11, 1999	MACW show	Elizabeth City, North Carolina	1	367	Reigning Northern Continental Tag Team champions; awarded Mid-Atlantic Tag Team Title around March 17, 2000.	
—	Vacated	September 12, 2000	—	—	—	—	When Dawson leaves NWA to become pit crew member for a NASCAR Winston Cup team. Title vacated as of September 5, 2002.	
53	The Midnight Express (Bobby Eaton and Rick Nelson)	December 7, 2002	MACW show	Asheville, North Carolina	1	N/A	Defeat the Road Warrior Hawk and Mad Maxx.	
—	Vacated	December 2, 2004	—	—	—	—		
54	Dusty Rhodes and Buff Bagwell	January 22, 2005	MACW show	Seoul, South Korea	1	N/A	Defeat Terry Taylor and Rikki Nelson.	
—		August 20, 2005	—	—				
55	Rick Steiner and Terry Taylor	September 24, 2005	MACW show	Concord, North Carolina	1	N/A	Defeat Tommy Gunn and Ricky Morton.	
—		November 8, 2006	—	—				
56	The Steiner Brothers (Rick (2) and Scott)	December 9, 2006	MACW show	Easley, South Carolina	1	45	Defeat Chris Hamrick and Rikki Nelson.	
—		January 23, 2007	—	—				
57	Buff Bagwell (2) and Rick Nelson (2)	May 2, 2009	MACW show	Shelby, North Carolina	1	259	Defeat Reid Flair and David Flair.	
58	The Rock 'n' Roll Express (Robert Gibson and Ricky Morton)	January 16, 2010	MACW show	Caldwell, North Carolina	1	105		
59	Buff Bagwell (3) and Rick Nelson (3)	May 1, 2010	MACW show	Anderson, South Carolina	2	140		
60	The Rock 'n' Roll Express (Robert Gibson and Ricky Morton)	September 18, 2010	MACW show	Maiden, North Carolina	2	49		
61	Brad Armstrong and Ricky Morton (3)	November 6, 2010	MACW show	Taylorsville, North Carolina	1	N/A	Brad Armstrong replaces Robert Gibson to defeats Chris Hamrick and Jeff Lewis, still champions as of December 4, 2010.	
—	Vacated	April 8, 2012	—	—	—	—	MACW leaves the NWA in 2012. Title vacated as of October 1, 2012. No Championship by Ricky Nelson or the old MACW is sanctioned or recognized by the NWA after this date	
		N/A	N/A	N/A				
63	The Legion of KAOS (Damien Wayne and Lance Erickson)	November 2, 2013	MACW show	Kingsport, Tennessee	1	252	Defeat C&C Wrestle Factory (Caprice Coleman and Cedric Alexander) to win vacant title.	
—	Vacated	July 12, 2014	MACW show	Carolina Beach, North Carolina	—	—	When Legion Of Kaos split up to pursue singles careers.	
64	The Brutes (Mark James and Jimmy Parker)	June 20, 2015	MACW show	Louisburg, North Carolina	1	252	Defeated The A.H.L. and The Cabellero's in a 3-way for the vacant titles at NWA R.A.G.E. XII.	
65	The Sound and The Fury (Will Huckaby and Joe Black)	February 27, 2016	MACW show	Williamston, North Carolina	1	408	Defeated The Brutes (Jimmy Parker and Mark James) and 1st Generation (Victor Andrews and James Anthony) in a Triple Threat at "Onslaught".	
—	Deactivated	April 10, 2017	—	—	—	—		

== See also ==
- List of National Wrestling Alliance championships
