= The Missouri Mauler =

American professional wrestler (1931–1996)

Personal information
- Born: Larry Hamilton; March 11, 1931 St. Joseph, Missouri, U.S.
- Died: July 20, 1996 (aged 65) St. Joseph, Missouri, U.S.

Professional wrestling career
- Ring name(s): The Missouri Mauler; Rocky Hamilton; Thunderbolt; The Black Secret
- Billed height: 6 ft 4 in (1.93 m)
- Billed weight: 325 lb (147 kg)
- Debut: c. 1950
- Retired: 1981

Larry Edward "Rocky" Hamilton (April 1, 1931 – July 20, 1996), better known by his ring name the Missouri Mauler, was an American professional wrestler who competed in the National Wrestling Alliance, becoming a mainstay of the latter promotion throughout the 1960s.

One of the earliest professional wrestlers to appear on televised wrestling events, he feuded with many popular wrestlers of the era including Jack Brisco, "Plowboy" Stan Frazier, Steve Keirn, Tim Woods, Tarzan Tyler and Fritz Von Erich during his 31-year career.

He is also the older brother of wrestler Jody Hamilton who competed as the masked wrestler the Assassin as well as the uncle of former World Championship Wrestling official Nick Patrick.

== Career ==
=== Early life and career ===
Making his debut in the Missouri area during the early 1950s, he began wrestling for promoter Ed Don George in Buffalo, New York, where he and his brother began teaming together as the Hamilton Brothers in 1957 headlining an event at Madison Square Garden against Antonino Rocca and Miguel Perez the following year.

Splitting up shortly thereafter, Hamilton and his brother went their separate ways leaving New York in October 1958 with Joseph Hamilton leaving for San Francisco while Larry Hamilton began working for promoter Jim Crockett, Sr. in the Carolinas.

=== Crockett Promotions ===
It was during his time in what would later become Jim Crockett Promotions that Larry Hamilton would find his greatest success becoming a major star in the promotion in only a few years. Appearing in the earliest televised matches for the promotion, Hamilton teamed with the Great Bolo to win the regional tag team title from Mr. Moto and Duke Keomuka in 1959.

The two would remain the top "heel" tag team in the promotion until the early 1960s when Joseph Hamilton was brought into the promotion and began teaming with the Great Bolo in 1961 (the two would continue teaming together as the Assassins for the next 15 years).

Hamilton and the Masked Bolos (Jody Hamilton and Tom Renesto) faced Haystacks Calhoun and the Kentuckyians (John Quinn and Grizzly Smith) in a series of six-man tag team matches during the next year setting several attendance records in the Carolina-Virginia area including an event held the Greenville Memorial Auditorium in Greenville, South Carolina.

During the early 1970s, Hamilton formed a successful tag team with Jim "Brute" Bernard winning the Texas-based NWA America and NWA Atlantic Coast tag team titles between 1971 and 1972.

=== Later years ===
Following his retirement in 1981, Hamilton entered bail bonding and was involved in the St. James Catholic Church in his hometown St. Joseph, Missouri. In later years, Hamilton lived with his elderly mother and underwent hip replacement surgery, but remained in relatively good health until his death from a heart attack on July 20, 1996.

== Championships and accomplishments ==
- American Wrestling Association
  - Nebraska Heavyweight Championship (2 times)
- Central States Wrestling

- NWA North American Tag Team Championship (Central States version) (1 time) - with Dutch Savage
- NWA United States Heavyweight Championship (Central States version) (2 times)

- L&G Promotions

- L&G Caribbean Heavyweight Championship (1 time)

- Championship Wrestling from Florida

- NWA Brass Knuckles Championship (Florida version) (2 times)
- NWA Florida Heavyweight Championship (1 time)
- NWA Florida Television Championship (1 time)
- NWA Southern Heavyweight Championship (Florida version) (6 times)

- Mid-Atlantic Championship Wrestling

- NWA Eastern States Heavyweight Championship (2 times)
- NWA Atlantic Coast Tag Team Championship (1 time) - with Brute Bernard
- NWA Southern Tag Team Championship (Mid-Atlantic version) (2 times) - with Great Bolo (1) and Pampero Firpo (1)

- NWA Big Time Wrestling

- NWA American Heavyweight Championship (1 time)
- NWA American Tag Team Championship (1 time) - with Brute Bernard
- NWA Texas Heavyweight Championship (1 time)

- World Championship Wrestling (Australia)^{1}

- NWA Austra-Asian Tag Team Championship (1 time) - with Steve Rackman

- Southeastern Championship Wrestling - Continental Championship Wrestling

- NWA Southeast United States Junior Heavyweight Championship (2 times)

=== Notes ===
^{1}Note: This promotion, though named World Championship Wrestling, was an NWA affiliated promotion based out of Australia and operated from the 60's to the 90's. This promotion should not be confused with the U.S.-based World Championship Wrestling once owned by Ted Turner and sold to World Wrestling Entertainment in 2001.
