= NWA Mid-Atlantic Heavyweight Championship =

Professional wrestling championship

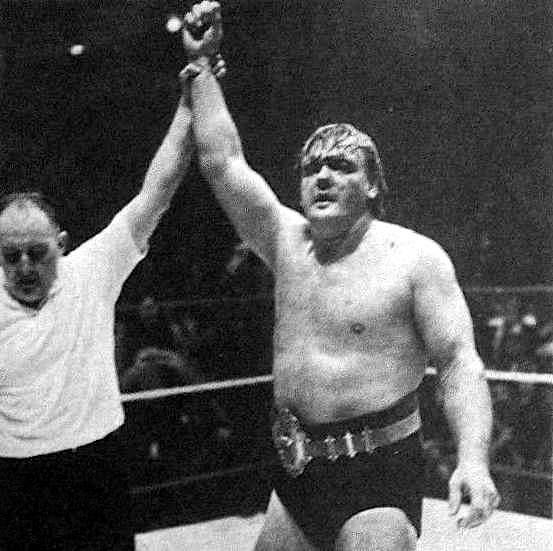
- Johnny Valentine wearing the NWA Mid-Atlantic Heavyweight Championship title belt in 1975

Details
- Promotion: National Wrestling Alliance; Jim Crockett Promotions; Mid-Atlantic Championship Wrestling
- Date established: October 13, 1970
- Date retired: December 26, 1986

Other name
- NWA Eastern Heavyweight Championship
Statistics
- First champion: Pat O'Connor
- Most reigns: Wahoo McDaniel (7 reigns)
- Longest reign: Ken Patera (334 days)
- Shortest reign: Pat O'Connor (1 day) (Note: The exact date on which Pat O' Connor won his only reign is unknown, which means that it lasted between 1 and 285 days.)

The NWA Mid-Atlantic Heavyweight Championship, originally known as the NWA Eastern States Heavyweight Championship, was a professional wrestling championship promoted in Jim Crockett Promotions (JCP), a territory-promotion governed by the National Wrestling Alliance (NWA).

== Title history ==
On October 13, 1970, the championship was introduced as the NWA Eastern Heavyweight Championship during a taping of Championship Wrestling. (Note: Championship Wrestling was a television program for JCP that began airing on local WGHP television markets in 1964.) It was announced that the Missouri Mauler had defeated the defending champion Pat O'Connor in New York City to win the title; this title change was fictitious and a storyline to introduce the championship to the promotion; nevertheless, O'Connor's reign is denoted as the first official reign. Because it was fictitious, further information regarding O'Connor's reign is unavailable.

On the September 6, 1973 taping of Championship Wrestling, JCP owner Jim Crockett Jr. announced the retirement of the NWA Eastern Heavyweight Championship and the establishment of the NWA Mid-Atlantic Heavyweight Championship. At the time of this change, Jerry Brisco was in his fourth reign as the NWA Eastern Heavyweight Champion, and as a result of never losing the title, he was recognized as the first NWA Mid-Atlantic Heavyweight Champion. Because Brisco's fourth reign did not end, being awarded the NWA Mid-Atlantic Heavyweight Title is not counted as a new reign overall in the title's history. By 1974, JCP was also known as "Mid-Atlantic Championship Wrestling" (MACW), which is why all of its championships included "Mid-Atlantic" in their names.

On December 26, 1986, Ron Garvin, after winning JCP's version of the NWA United States Tag Team Championship with Barry Windham, vacated the NWA Mid-Atlantic Heavyweight Championship and handed the belt to Crockett Jr. on a taping of World Championship Wrestling. (Note: World Championship Wrestling was a television program for JCP that began airing on WTBS television markets in 1981.) Crockett Jr. deactivated the championship for unknown reasons, and eventually, JCP was sold to Ted Turner in 1988, thus becoming the new promotion, World Championship Wrestling.

In the late 1990s, NWA gave a group of promoters permission to establish a territory called "Mid-Atlantic Championship Wrestling"; however, this territory has not claimed any connection to the original JCP/MACW. As a result, their prime championship, called the MACW Heavyweight Championship, has no connection to this original championship or its lineage.

== Reigns ==
Overall, there were 63 reigns among 29 wrestlers. Fifteen of those reigns occurred while the title was called the "NWA Eastern Heavyweight Championship" while 46 reigns occurred under the "NWA Mid-Atlantic Heavyweight Championship" name. Johnny Valentine ranks first in combined reigns by the length of 504 days with 2 reigns total. Wahoo McDaniel had the most reigns with seven. Ken Patera's second reign was the longest in the title's history at 334 days. All title changes occurred at JCP–promoted events: live events, pay-per-view events, and on televised events that aired on broadcast delay.

Key
No.	Overall reign number
Reign	Reign number for the specific champion
Days	Number of days held

No.	Champion	Championship change			Reign statistics		Notes	Ref.
No.	Champion	Date	Event	Location	Reign	Days	Notes	Ref.
NWA Eastern Heavyweight Championship
1	Pat O'Connor	August 8, 1970	Live event	N/A	1	66	It was announced in local advertisements that O'Connor was the reigning Eastern Heavyweight Champion until October 13, 1970, when he lost the championship to the Missouri Mauler; this reign was a storyline to introduce the championship to JCP, and as a result, further information regarding how O'Connor won the title is unavailable.	
2	The Missouri Mauler	October 13, 1970	Championship Wrestling	N/A	1	275	The Missouri Mauler announced on local television from WGHP television studios that he had defeated O'Connor for the title in New York City; the title change was a continuation of the storyline to introduce the championship to JCP, and as a result, further information regarding the title change is unavailable. This title change aired on broadcast delay.	
3	Danny Miller	July 15, 1971	Live event	Greensboro, North Carolina	1	67		
4	The Missouri Mauler	September 20, 1971	Live event	Charlotte, North Carolina	2	71		
5	Jack Brisco	November 30, 1971	Championship Wrestling	High Point, North Carolina	1	76	This title change aired on broadcast delay.	
6	Rip Hawk	February 14, 1972	Live event	Charlotte, North Carolina	1	56		
7	Jack Brisco	April 10, 1972	Live event	Charlotte, North Carolina	2	42		
8	Rip Hawk	May 22, 1972	Live event	San Juan, Puerto Rico	2	22		
9	Jerry Brisco	June 13, 1972	Live event	Columbia, South Carolina	1	76		
10	Rip Hawk	August 28, 1972	Live event	Greenville, South Carolina	3	7		
11	Jerry Brisco	September 4, 1972	Live event	Greenville, South Carolina	2	115		
12	Rip Hawk	December 28, 1972	Live event	Greensboro, North Carolina	4	65		
13	Jerry Brisco	March 3, 1973	Live vent	Salem, North Carolina	3	67		
14	Ole Anderson	May 9, 1973	All Star Wrestling (Note: All Star Wrestling, Wide World Wrestling, and World Wide Wrestling were television programs for JCP that began airing on local WRAL television markets in the late 1950s.)	Raleigh, North Carolina	1	55	This title change aired on broadcast delay.	
NWA Mid-Atlantic Heavyweight Championship
15 (1)	Jerry Brisco	July 3, 1973	Live event	Columbia, South Carolina	4	186	On September 6, 1973 the NWA retired the NWA Eastern Heavyweight Championship and introduced the NWA Mid-Atlantic Heavyweight Championship to JCP as its replacement. As a result of Brisco being recognized as the final NWA Eastern Heavyweight Champion later the NWA recognized him as the first NWA Mid-Atlantic Heavyweight Champion. However, this reign is not considered to be a new reign overall in the title's history because Jerry Brisco originally never lost the title.	
16 (2)	Johnny Valentine	January 5, 1974	Live event	N/A	1	296	From the information known, Jim Crockett Jr. awarded Johnny Valentine the championship after Brisco traveled to Japan to wrestle and could not defend the title in the United States; a formal vacancy was not established, however.	
—	Vacated	October 28, 1974	—	—	—	—		
17 (3)	Johnny Valentine	November 4, 1974	Live event	N/A	2	135		
18 (4)	Paul Jones	March 9, 1975	Live event	Charlotte, North Carolina	1	10	Jones' title win became a controversy as a result of Valentine having his leg on the ring rope when the referee counted the pinfall, which the referee failed to see. If this were seen, the pin count would have been stopped.	
19 (5)	Johnny Valentine	March 19, 1975	All Star Wrestling	Raleigh, North Carolina	3	102	Valentine demanded a review of his match with Jones by NWA President Sam Muchnick, who ruled in favor of Valentine. As a result, Muchnick stripped Jones of the championship and awarded it to Valentine; a formal vacancy was not established, however. This title change aired on tape delay.	
20 (6)	Wahoo McDaniel	June 29, 1975	Live event	Asheville, North Carolina	1	11		
21 (7)	Ric Flair	July 10, 1975	Live event	N/A	1	16		
22 (8)	Wahoo McDaniel	July 26, 1975	Live event	Asheville, North Carolina	2	56		
23 (9)	Ric Flair	September 20, 1975	Live event	Hampton, Virginia	2	226		
24 (10)	Wahoo McDaniel	May 3, 1976	Live event	Charlotte, North Carolina	3	21		
25 (11)	Ric Flair	May 24, 1976	Live event	Charlotte, North Carolina	3	110		
26 (12)	Wahoo McDaniel	September 11, 1976	Live event	Greenville, South Carolina	4	35		
27 (13)	Ric Flair	October 16, 1976	Live event	Greensboro, North Carolina	4	72		
28 (14)	Wahoo McDaniel	December 27, 1976	Live event	Richmond, Virginia	5	166		
29 (15)	Greg Valentine	June 11, 1977	Live event	Greensboro, North Carolina	1	59		
30 (16)	Wahoo McDaniel	August 9, 1977	Live event	Raleigh, North Carolina	6	29		
31 (17)	Greg Valentine	September 7, 1977	Mid-Atlantic Championship Wrestling	Raleigh, North Carolina	2	207	This title change aired on broadcast delay. As part of the storyline, Valentine "broke" Wahoo's leg, but this was not a legitimate injury.	
32 (18)	Wahoo McDaniel	April 2, 1978	Live event	Greensboro, North Carolina	7	7		
33 (19)	Ken Patera	April 9, 1978	Live event	Charlotte, North Carolina	1	161		
33 (20)	Tony Atlas	September 17, 1978	Live event	Roanoke, Virginia	1	28		
34 (21)	Ken Patera	October 15, 1978	Live event	Roanoke, Virginia	2	334		
35 (22)	Jim Brunzell	September 14, 1979	Live event	Richmond, Virginia	1	69		
36 (23)	Ray Stevens	November 22, 1979	Live event	Greensboro, North Carolina	1	33		
37 (24)	Jim Brunzell	December 25, 1979	Live event	Charlotte, North Carolina	2	168		
38 (25)	The Iron Sheik	May 11, 1980	Live event	Charlotte, North Carolina	1	174		
39 (26)	Ricky Steamboat	November 1, 1980	Live event	Richmond, Virginia	1	166		
40 (27)	Ivan Koloff	April 16, 1981	Live event	Norfolk, Virginia	1	177		
41 (28)	Ricky Steamboat	October 10, 1981	Live event	Greensboro, North Carolina	2	22		
42 (29)	Roddy Piper	November 1, 1981	Live event	Greensboro, North Carolina	1	180		
43 (30)	Jack Brisco	May 10, 1982	Live event	Greenville, North Carolina	3 (1)	58		
43 (31)	Roddy Piper	July 7, 1982	Mid-Atlantic Championship Wrestling	Charlotte, North Carolina	2	27	This title change aired on broadcast delay.	
44 (32)	Jack Brisco	August 3, 1982	Live event	Raleigh, North Carolina	4 (2)	29		
45 (33)	Paul Jones	September 1, 1982	Mid-Atlantic Championship Wrestling	Charlotte, North Carolina	2	47	This title change aired on broadcast delay.	
46 (34)	Jack Brisco	October 18, 1982	Live event	Greenville, South Carolina	5 (3)	15		
47 (35)	Paul Jones	November 2, 1982	Live event	Raleigh, North Carolina	3	28		
48 (36)	Jack Brisco	November 30, 1982	Live event	Columbia, South Carolina	6	61		
49 (37)	Dory Funk Jr.	January 30, 1983	Live event	Charlotte, North Carolina	1	187		
50 (38)	Rufus Jones	August 5, 1983	Live event	Richmond, Virginia	1	120		
51 (39)	Dick Slater	December 3, 1983	Live event	Hampton, Virginia	1	11		
52 (40)	Ivan Koloff	January 11, 1984	(Note: From 1983 to 1984, JCP taped programming in indoor arenas to air on television markets; however, the name of the programming and the markets it aired on is unknown.)	N/A	2	14	After Dick Slater won the NWA United States Championship on December 14, 1983, he elected to award Ivan Koloff the NWA Mid-Atlantic Heavyweight Championship; aired on broadcast delay 1/14/84.	
53 (41)	Angelo Mosca Jr.	January 25, 1984	Live event	Shelby, North Carolina	1	53		
54 (42)	Ivan Koloff	March 18, 1984	Live event	Charlotte, North Carolina	3	35		
55 (43)	Angelo Mosca Jr.	April 22, 1984		Charlotte, North Carolina	2	20	This title change aired on broadcast delay.	
56 (44)	The Masked Outlaw	May 12, 1984		Spencer, North Carolina	2	46	The Masked Outlaw was an alternate ring name of Dory Funk Jr. (who was suspended for shoving NWA representative Sandy Scott), who had won the title under his real name previously. This title change aired on broadcast delay.	
57 (45)	Angelo Mosca Jr.	June 27, 1984		Norfolk, Virginia	3	63	This title change aired on broadcast delay.	
58 (46)	Ron Bass	August 29, 1984		Spartanburg, South Carolina	1	199	This title change aired on broadcast delay.	
59 (47)	Buzz Tyler	March 16, 1985		Greensboro, North Carolina	1	121	This title change aired on broadcast delay.	
—	Vacated	July 15, 1985	—	—	—	—	Buzz Tyler was stripped of the championship after he left JCP; title was declared vacant as a result.	
60 (48)	Krusher Khrushchev	November 28, 1985	Starrcade (1985)	Greensboro, North Carolina	1	44	Krusher Khrushchev defeated Sam Houston in a tournament final to win the vacant championship.	
61 (49)	Sam Houston	January 11, 1986	World Championship Wrestling	Atlanta, Georgia	1	66	This title change aired on broadcast delay. Khrushchev legitimately injured his knee during this match; he would miss six months of action.	
62 (50)	Black Bart	March 18, 1986	Live event	Mooresville, North Carolina	1	168		
63 (51)	Ron Garvin	September 2, 1986	Live event	Spartanburg, South Carolina	1	115		
—	Deactivated	December 26, 1986	World Championship Wrestling	—	—	—	After winning JCP's version of the NWA United States Tag Team Championship with Barry Windham, Garvin vacated the NWA Mid-Atlantic Heavyweight Championship and handed it to Jim Crockett Jr. The title was deactivated afterwards for unknown reasons by Crockett Jr., and JCP was then sold to Ted Turner in 1988. As a result, Ron Garvin was the final wrestler to hold the NWA Mid-Atlantic Heavyweight Title.	

=== Combined reigns ===
Key

Symbol	Meaning
¤	The exact length of at least one title reign is uncertain, so the shortest possible length is used.

Rank	Wrestler	# of reigns	Combined days
1	Johnny Valentine	3	504¤ (Note: The exact date on which Johnny Valentine won his first reign is unknown, which means that it lasted between 402 and 432 days.)
2	Ken Patera	2	495
3	Jerry Brisco	4	440¤ (Note: The exact date on which Jerry Brisco lost his fourth championship reign is unknown, which means that it lasted between 182 and 212 days.)
4	Ric Flair	4	408¤
5	Missouri Mauler	2	347
6	Wahoo McDaniel	7	341¤
7	Greg Valentine	2	266
8	Jack Brisco	6	253¤ (Note: The exact date on which Jack Brisco lost his second reign in unknown, which means that it lasted between 15 and 45 days.)
9	Jim Brunzell	2	237
10	Ivan Koloff	3	237¤ (Note: The exact date on which Ivan Koloff was awarded the championship by Dick Slater took place between December 14 and December 31, 1983, which means that his second reign lasted between 25 and 42 days.)
11	Dory Funk, Jr./The Masked Outlaw	2	233
12	Roddy Piper	2	207
13	Ron Bass	1	199
14	Rick Steamboat	2	188
15	The Iron Sheik	1	174
16	Black Bart	1	168
17	Rip Hawk	4	147¤ (Note: The exact date on which Rip Hawk won his second reign is unknown, although it is confirmed in sources that it took place between April 25, 1972 and May 25, 1972. As a result, his reign lasted between 19 and 49 days.)
18	Angelo Mosca, Jr.	3	136
19	Rufus Jones	1	120
20	Ron Garvin	1	115
21	Buzz Tyler	1	107¤ (Note: The exact date on which Buzz Tyler was stripped of the championship is unknown, which means that his only reign lasted between 107 and 137 days.)
22	Paul Jones	2	85
23	Danny Miller	1	67
24	Sam Houston	1	66
25	Ole Anderson	1	55
26	Ray Stevens	1	33
27	Tony Atlas	1	28
28	Dick Slater	1	28¤ (Note: The exact date on which Dick Slater awarded Ivan Koloff the championship is unknown, which means that his only reign lasted between 11 and 28 days.)
29	Pat O'Connor	1	1¤

== See also ==
- Jim Crockett Promotions alumni
- NWA Worlds Heavyweight Championship
- List of NWA World Heavyweight Champions
