= Swede Hanson (wrestler) =

American professional wrestler (1933–2002)

Personal information
- Born: Robert Fort Hanson; March 27, 1933 East Orange, New Jersey, U.S.
- Died: February 19, 2002 (aged 68) Columbia, South Carolina, U.S.

Professional wrestling career
- Ring name: Swede Hanson
- Billed height: 6 ft 5 in (1.96 m)
- Billed weight: 300 lb (140 kg)
- Trained by: George Tragos
- Debut: 1957
- Retired: 1986

Robert Fort Hanson (March 27, 1933 – February 19, 2002) was an American professional wrestler best known by his ring name Swede Hanson. He spent much of his career wrestling as part of a tag team with Rip Hawk. Together, they held championships in four different promotions.

Hanson and Hawk were villain wrestlers and competed against some of the most popular teams of their time. They later feuded with each other when Hawk found a new partner after Hanson suffered a legitimate heart attack. Hanson retired in 1986 and lived in South Carolina until his death in 2002.

== Early life ==
Hanson was born in East Orange, New Jersey. He attended high school until his senior year; although he was offered a football scholarship to Wake Forest University, he declined the offer and stopped attending school. His mother was struggling financially, so Hanson became an aircraft mechanic to help his family. He also competed as an amateur boxer, and he compiled a 61–3 record in New Jersey Golden Gloves competitions.

== Professional wrestling career ==
Boxing and professional wrestling promoter Willie Gilzenberg discovered Hanson and convinced him to compete in wrestling. He trained with George Tragos and debuted in WWWF (now World Wrestling Entertainment) in Paterson, New Jersey, against Miguel Torres in 1957. Hanson was sent to Pittsburgh, Pennsylvania, to compete while he continued to develop his skills. While there, he wrestled against Bruno Sammartino in Sammartino's debut match.

He was later hired by Jim Crockett and moved to the Carolinas to compete. While there, he began teaming with Rip Hawk to form a tag team known as the "Blond Bombers". They competed as heels (villains) and were hated by the crowds. During appearances, fans would throw acid or threaten them with knives and guns. In one attack, Hanson was stabbed in the leg and required 72 stitches. Hawk taught Hanson a move called the reverse neckbreaker, which saw Hanson stand back-to-back with his opponent, clasp his hands under the opponent's chin, and fall to the ring floor while pulling the opponent with him. This became Hanson's signature maneuver that he used in most matches.

Hanson remained silent during the team's interviews while Hawk did most of the talking. The team won its first title on August 3, 1965, when they defeated Hiro Matsuda and Duke Keomuka to win the Florida version of the NWA World Tag Team Championship. They also competed in Mid-Atlantic Championship Wrestling, where they became the inaugural NWA Atlantic Coast Tag Team Champions. They held the title belts four times between 1968 and 1971 while feuding with George Becker and Johnny Weaver. During that time, they also won the IWA World Tag Team Championship while competing in Tasmania. While in the Carolinas, Hanson and Hawk spent a lot of time with Ric Flair when Flair entered the wrestling business. Hawk stated that Flair used to cause trouble for the group, including one incident in which Flair flirted with the girlfriend of a Mafia member. Hanson and Hawk used their friendship with the Mafia member to help Flair escape from being killed in revenge.

In 1971, Hanson suffered a heart attack and had to take time away from wrestling. After returning, he formed a tag team with Super Destroyer. The partnership was short-lived, as Super Destroyer later turned on Hanson. As a result, Hanson become a face (fan favorite) and the two feuded for several months. In 1974, Hanson and his new partner, Tiger Conway Jr., began a feud with Hawk and Ric Flair. The series of matches later evolved into singles matches that pitted former partners Hanson and Hawk against each other. Hanson later became a less high-profile wrestler and was given the role of putting over new wrestlers in the promotion. Hanson left the territory for a while but later returned with a new gimmick. He had frizzy hair and wore psychedelic clothes while teaming with Gene Anderson and Sgt. Jacques Goulet.

Hanson returned to the WWWF in 1979 as a vicious heel under the management of Fred Blassie. To build up his heat, many of his opponents were stretchered-out of the ring following their matches with Swede. He unsuccessfully challenged World champion Bob Backlund at Madison Square Garden in October of that year.

Hanson and Hawk later reformed their team and competed together in the Amarillo, Texas-based NWA Western States Sports. While there, they won the NWA Western States Tag Team Championship three times. Hanson's final title reign was the only one that did not involve Hawk, as he teamed with The Hangman in Montreal, Quebec to win the Canadian International Tag Team Championship in 1981. Hanson then returned to McMahon's New England–based Capitol Wrestling, which had since become the World Wrestling Federation (WWF). Using the gimmick of a redneck, complete with long hair and a Confederate flag, he competed for the WWF as a face until his retirement in 1986.

== Personal life ==
During the course of his wrestling career, he was married twice. While both marriages ended in divorce, he and his second wife remained close until the day he died. Swede's marriages brought him seven children and twelve grandchildren. Swede's first marriage to a woman named Vicky, brought him a daughter and son, named Linda and Lance. Then he married a woman named Doris, which brought him another daughter and son, Luana and Bobby. He also gained a stepson, Billy Roy and two adopted children, Mary and Carol, through his second marriage. Hanson lived in Charlotte, NC for over 20+ years. In the late 80's, Hanson and his second wife moved to Fort Mill, SC. After divorcing his second wife, he remained living in a double-wide mobile home on five acres of land in Fort Mill, South Carolina. He was later engaged to a woman named Patsy Hughes.

During his wrestling career, Hanson also worked in construction and had a position as a bouncer. After retiring from wrestling, Hanson worked a series of jobs. He was a trainer at a fitness center and later returned to construction work. His final position was as manager of a nightclub. Hanson also participated in several golf tournaments to raise money for charities.

== Death and legacy ==
In his later life, Hanson suffered from diabetes and Alzheimer's disease. He also had high blood pressure and heart problems. He was hospitalized in Columbia, South Carolina, in October 2001 due to dementia and died from sepsis, on February 19, 2002.

Hanson is regarded as an intimidating but honest wrestler. The character he portrayed was hated by many fans, but Hanson was different from many heel wrestlers because he did not cheat to win matches. Even while competing as a heel, however, Hanson and Hawk were admired by many spectators and had a fan club devoted to them. In contrast to Hawk, who remained a heel during his entire run in Mid-Atlantic Championship Wrestling, Hanson gained popularity with even more fans when he feuded with Hawk and became the promotion's top face wrestler. Writers who have looked back on his career have noted that he wrestled with "heart" and always worked his hardest in the ring. Hanson has had a lasting impact on the business, as he was willing to put over other wrestlers, including Blackjack Mulligan and Angelo Mosca to help boost their careers. He and Hawk also helped popularize the quick tag, which saw them trading places in the ring every few seconds to remain energized while their opponents became worn down.

== Championships and accomplishments ==
- Championship Wrestling from Florida
  - NWA World Tag Team Championship (Florida version) (1 time) – with Rip Hawk
- Lutte Internationale
  - Canadian International Tag Team Championship (1 time) – with The Hangman
- Mid-Atlantic Championship Wrestling
  - NWA Atlantic Coast Tag Team Championship (4 times) – with Rip Hawk
  - NWA Southern Tag Team Championship (Mid-Atlantic version) (1 time) – with Rip Hawk
- NWA Western States Sports
  - NWA Western States Tag Team Championship (3 times) – with Rip Hawk
- World Championship Wrestling (Australia)
  - IWA World Tag Team Championship (1 time) – with Rip Hawk
