= World Brass Knuckles Championship =

Wrestling

Details
- Promotion: World Championship Wrestling
- Date established: 1974
- Date retired: 1978
Statistics
- First champion: Ciclon Negro
- Final champion: King Curtis Iaukea

The World Brass Knuckles Championship was a professional wrestling brass knuckles championship in the Australian World Championship Wrestling promotion from 1974 until 1978.

== Title history ==
Wrestler	Reign	Date	Location	Notes
Ciclon Negro	1	October 1974	New York City	Billed as having defeated Brute Bernard for the title.
Mario Milano	1	7 November 1974	Melbourne, Victoria	
Brute Bernard	1	January 1974	Sydney, New South Wales	Wins in a tag team match, teaming with Waldo Von Erich to defeat Mario Milano & Tony Parisi but was stripped in 74/08 after throwing dye in Killer Karl Koxs eye.
Mario Milano	2	January 1974	Hordern Pavilion, Sydney, New South Wales	Defeated Bob Roop to win the vacant title.
Leorenzo Parente	1	May 1974	Sydney, New South Wales	
Mario Milano	3	June 1974	Sydney, New South Wales	
Bull Ramos	1	June 1975	Melbourne, Victoria	
Great Mephisto	1	6 August 1975	Melbourne, Victoria	
Rocky Romero	1	1975	Melbourne, Victoria	
Great Mephisto	2	1975	Sydney, New South Wales	
Ron Miller	1	December 1975	??	
George Barnes	1	12 February 1976	??	
Ron Miller	2	December 1976	Brisbane, Queensland	
Ciclon Negro	2	October 1976	Melbourne, Victoria	Vacant in 76 when Negero leaves the area.
Bugsy McGraw	1	December 1977	Sydney, New South Wales	Defeats Larry O'Day.
Kevin Martin	1	December 1977	Sydney, New South Wales	
Butcher Brannigan	1	December 1977	Sydney, New South Wales	
Mario Milano	4	December 1977	Sydney, New South Wales	
Butcher Brannigan	2	December 1977	??	
Ron Miller	3	December 1977	??	
Bruiser Brody	1	December 1978	Sydney, New South Wales	
Ron Miller	4	December 1978	Sydney, New South Wales	
Brute Bernard	2	December 1978	Sydney, New South Wales	
King Curtis Iaukea	1	December 1978	Sydney, New South Wales	
Bulldog Brower	1	December 1978	Sydney, New South Wales	
King Curtis Iaukea	2	December 1978	Sydney, New South Wales	
WCW closed in December 1978.

== See also ==
- Professional wrestling in Australia
- World Championship Wrestling
