= Butcher Brannigan =

American professional wrestler (1948–2009)

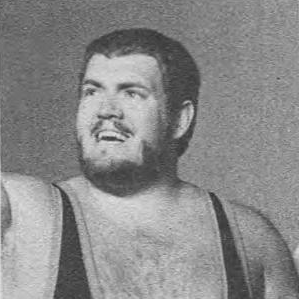

Personal information
- Born: Joseph Novo; September 3, 1948 Perth Amboy, New Jersey, U.S.
- Died: September 6, 2009 (aged 61) Hamilton, New Jersey, U.S.

Professional wrestling career
- Ring name(s): Butcher Brannigan; Buck Brannigan; Crusher Brannigan; The Grappler; Joe Nova
- Billed height: 6 ft 3 in (191 cm)
- Billed weight: 290 klb
- Debut: 1970
- Retired: 1980s

Joseph Novo (September 3, 1948 – September 6, 2009) was an American professional wrestler. He is known for his appearances with promotions such as Championship Wrestling from Florida, IWA Australia, World Wide Wrestling Federation and Stampede Wrestling in the 1970s and early 1980s.

== Professional wrestling career ==
=== Early career (1970–1971) ===
Novo made his wrestling debut in 1970. In the summer of 1972 he went to Japan to work for Japan Wrestling Association

=== World Wide Wrestling Federation (1971–1972) ===
In 1971, he made his debut as in the New York for the World Wide Wrestling Federation as Joe Nova who worked as a jobber. He would have matches against Gorilla Monsoon, Jimmy Valiant, and Chuck O'Connor.

=== Championship Wrestling from Florida (1972–1973) ===
Novo would wrestle as Joe Nova from Championship Wrestling from Florida in 1972. He would feud with Bob Orton Jr., Tony Garea, and Frank Hester.

=== World Class Championship Wrestling (1973) ===
In 1973, he went to Fritz Von Erich's World Class Championship Wrestling in Texas. He wrestled as Butcher Brannigan. He scored a victory over the Khosrow Vaziri on October 23 who later became known the Iron Sheik.

=== Return to World Wide Wrestling Federation (1973–1975) ===
He would return to the Northeast as Butcher Brannigan and later Butcher Nova. He feuded with Spiros Arion. He wrestled at Madison Square Garden on April 14, 1975, as he lost to Édouard Carpentier. He left the company later that year.

=== Stampede Wrestling (1975–1976) ===
In 1975, he went to Calgary, Alberta for Stu Hart's Stampede Wrestling. On December 12, he lost in the tournament final to Frankie Laine for the Stampede North American Heavyweight Championship.

In 1976, he also appeared briefly in the television series "Starsky and Hutch" (Season 1 Episode 2 - "Texas Longhorn"). He is credited as "The Wrestler".

=== Return to World Class Championship Wrestling (1977) ===
In 1977, Brannigan returned to WCCW and feuded with Ivan Putski and Scott Casey. He left later that year.

=== World Championship Wrestling (1977–1978) ===
He went to wrestle for World Championship Wrestling in Australia in 1977. This would be the peak of his career. Teaming with Bugsy McGraw as they defeated Rick Martel and Larry O'Dea for the NWA Austra-Asian Tag Team Championship. Dropped the titles to O'Dea and Ron Miller on May 2, 1977. He would feud with O'Dea and Mario Milano. Afterwards he won the titles three more times with Killer Karl Krupp, Les Roberts, and Ox Baker.

In August 1978, he and Les Roberts won a tournament to win the vacated tag titles in Papua New Guinea. They dropped the belts to Larry O'Dea and Mario Milano on October 1. Then on October 27 found a new partner Ox Baker and defeated O'Dea and Milano. They dropped the titles to Andre the Giant and Ron Miller becoming the last champions on December 8. The promotion folded at the end of the year.

=== Late career ===
He went to wrestle for NWA Hollywood between 1978 and 1980. Later on, he wrestled as Buck Branngian. From 1979 to 1982 he wrestled for Georgia Championship Wrestling. In 1980 he returned to Championship Wrestling from Florida as a jobber. Also made appearances for Mid-Atlantic Championship Wrestling in 1982.

On September 17, 1981, he won the NWA British Empire/Commonwealth Championship defeating Steve Rickard.

In 1982, he went to England to wrestle for Joint Promotions as Crusher Brannigan.

In 1983, he once again won the NWA (New Zealand) British Empire/Commonwealth Heavyweight title.

== Death ==
He died just a few days after his 61st birthday on September 7, 2009, of kidney failure and heart disease.

== Championships and accomplishments ==
- Dominion Wrestling Union
  - NWA British Empire/Commonwealth Championship – (2 times)
- NWA Hollywood Wrestling
  - NWA Americas Tag Team Championship (1 Time) - with Man Mountain Mike
  - NWA "Beat the Champ" Television Championship – (1 time)
- World Championship Wrestling (Australia)
  - NWA Austra-Asian Tag Team Championship – (4 times) with Bugsy McGraw (1), Killer Karl Krupp (1), Les Roberts (1) and Ox Baker (1)
  - World Brass Knuckles Championship – (2 times)
