= Bugsy McGraw =

American professional wrestler (born 1944)

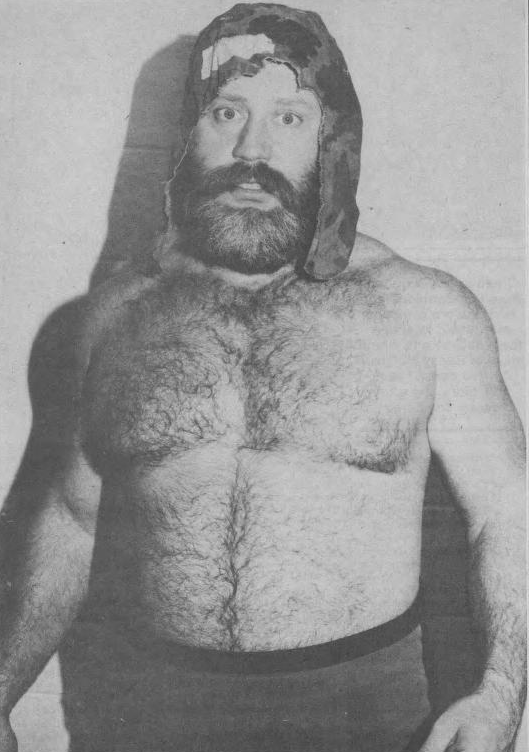
- Mcgraw, c. 1980

Personal information
- Born: Michael Davis; November 1, 1944 (age 81) Florida, United States

Professional wrestling career
- Ring name(s): Beautiful Brutus; Bugsy McGraw; Buggsy McGraw; The Big O The Brute; Michael Davis; The Mighty Brutus; The Skull
- Billed height: 6 ft 1 in (185 cm)
- Billed weight: 279 lb (127 kg)
- Billed from: Central Florida
- Debut: 1967
- Retired: 2005

Michael Davis (born November 1, 1944), best known by the ring names Bugsy McGraw and The Skull, is an American retired professional wrestler. McGraw is known for his long beard and for his philosophical, crazed rants during wrestling interviews. He was a major star in significant territories during the 1970s and 1980s, including major runs in Vancouver, Australia, Florida, Dallas and Memphis.

== Professional wrestling career ==
=== Early career (1967–1981) ===
Davis started his career as "The Big O" in 1967 in Florida, Detroit, and Central States Wrestling, wrestling under a mask. In 1971, he competed in Florida as "Beautiful Brutus", first managed by The Great Malenko, who he would go on to feud with after firing Malenko as his manager. Beautiful Brutus went on to defeat Malenko for the NWA Brass Knuckles Championship. Their feud led to a bloody series of matches across the Florida territory. In the mid 1970's he wrestled as The Brute in Gene Kiniski's All Star Wrestling in British Columbia and held their version of the Canadian Heavyweight title.

Under the name "Bugsy McGraw", he wrestled all over the world, including a brief stay in the World Wide Wrestling Federation. But his reputation was primarily built in Florida, where career highlights included beating Dusty Rhodes for the NWA Florida Television Championship and Don Muraco for the NWA Florida Heavyweight Championship in 1980. McGraw also feuded with major Florida stars Barry Windham, Dory Funk Jr. and Terry Funk.

=== Texas (1981–1982) ===
In late 1981, McGraw moved to Texas and World Class Championship Wrestling became a huge star there, first as a babyface feuding with Great Kabuki and defeating him for the NWA American Heavyweight Championship. He also competed as a heel, feuding with Bruiser Brody, Kerry Von Erich, and Kevin Von Erich. He also wrestled in a Body Slam Battle Royal, losing to André the Giant at Texas Stadium in 1982. McGraw wrestled in Memphis in the early 1980s in CWA mostly as a member of Jimmy Hart's heel First Family stable.

For part of his run as a heel, he was part of the heel stable of wrestlers managed by the managerial team of H&H (Armand Hussein and Gary Hart). McGraw made a face turn once again after both of his H&H managers turned on him, later defeating them in a handicap match at Wrestling Star Wars in August 1982.

=== Jim Crockett Promotions (1983) ===
After leaving Texas, McGraw would go to several territories, finally settling in Jim Crockett Promotions in North Carolina. He feuded with The Assassins, teaming mostly with Rufus R. Jones. McGraw and Jones won the NWA Mid-Atlantic Tag Team Championship and wrestled in the first Starrcade event, losing to The Assassins.

=== Championship Wrestling from Florida (1985–1987) ===
McGraw returned to the promotion he had the longest and most prominent run in, Championship Wrestling from Florida, and would start off in a big angle with the Fabulous Freebirds turning heel right away and jumping Mike Graham only to have him make the save and get the feud rolling often teaming with Mike Graham and Brian Blair and later Wahoo McDaniel. The Freebirds would eventually leave Florida and along with Blackjack Mulligan would feud with Percy Pringle, team of The Missing Link, The Assassin, and Abdullah the Butcher. He would have one more feud with Rip Rogers that would have Rip Rogers valet giving him a bottle with something in it to blind McGraw in early 1986. He would not be seen for over a year and would return in 1987 once again with Blackjack Mulligan feuding with Kevin Sullivan only to have Sullivan become a babyface to feud with Oliver Humperdink and Dory Funk Jr. and Terry Funk. Florida would later on merge and be absorbed by Jim Crockett Promotions and even with a brief teaming with Jimmy Valiant he would not be held on to by The Crocketts and would be let go.

=== Later career (1987–1991, 2004–2005) ===
He would show up for several independent promotions and would even join the reformed Florida Championship Wrestling as a heel and feud with old partner Blackjack Mulligan. He would retire from active competition in 1991. He would return to the ring a few times. On October 30, 2004 U of Virginia Children’s Medical Center Benefit Show Bugsy McGraw beat Masked Superstar. And January 29, 2005 at WrestleReunion participated in a Legends Battle Royal that was won by Greg Valentine.

=== Total Nonstop Action Wrestling (2009) ===
On the June 18, 2009, edition of Total Nonstop Action Wrestling's Impact! television show Davis appeared as the new head of security hired by Mick Foley.

== Personal life ==
After retiring from full-time wrestling, Davis enrolled in nursing school in 1988 and subsequently worked as a registered nurse for more than 20 years before retiring from nursing in 2014. While working as a nurse, he assisted with the care of Jack Brisco during the former world champion's health difficulties following open-heart surgery.

== Autobiography ==
On March 26, 2019, the release of Bugsy McGraw's autobiography was announced through a partnership between WOHW Publishing and the Darkstream Press imprint. The book was coauthored by Ian Douglass, the writer of Dan Severn's autobiography and a contributing writer of Hornswoggle's autobiography. It also included a foreword by Rocky Johnson and an afterword from Brian Blair. Davis insisted on using the two-G spelling of his wrestling name on the cover of the book, which he said he always tried to use in place of the one-G spelling for the sake of "being different."

The book finished sixth in the voting for the Wrestling Observer Newsletter's Best Pro Wrestling Book of 2019. In the process, it received the highest number of votes of any independently published pro wrestling autobiography released during that year.

== Championships and accomplishments ==
- American Wrestling Association
  - AWA Midwest Heavyweight Championship (1 time)
- Big Time Wrestling (San Francisco)
  - NWA United States Heavyweight Championship (San Francisco version) (1 time)
- Championship Wrestling from Florida
  - NWA Brass Knuckles Championship (Florida version) (1 time)
  - NWA Florida Heavyweight Championship (1 time)
  - NWA Florida Tag Team Championship (2 time) - with Pak Song (1) and Thor The Viking (1)
  - NWA Florida Television Championship (3 times)
  - NWA United States Tag Team Championship (Florida version) (1 time) - with Dusty Rhodes
- Mid-Atlantic Championship Wrestling
  - NWA Mid-Atlantic Tag Team Championship (1 time) - with Rufus R. Jones
- NWA All-Star Wrestling
  - NWA Canadian Tag Team Championship (Vancouver version) (3 times) - with Mike Webster (1), Gene Kiniski (1) and Mr. X (1)
  - NWA Pacific Coast Heavyweight Championship (Vancouver version) (1 time)
- NWA Big Time Wrestling / World Class Championship Wrestling
  - NWA Americas Heavyweight Championship (1 time)
  - NWA American Tag Team Championship (1 time) - with King Kong Bundy
  - NWA Brass Knuckles Championship (Texas version) (3 times)
  - WCCW Television Championship (1 time)
- NWA Tri-State
  - NWA North American Heavyweight Championship (Tri-State version) (1 time)
  - NWA United States Tag Team Championship (Tri-State version) (1 time) - with Dr. X
- World Championship Wrestling
  - NWA Austra-Asian Tag Team Championship (2 times) - with Butcher Brannigan (1) and Mario Milano (1)
  - World Brass Knuckles Championship
- Wrestling Observer Newsletter
  - Worst On Interviews (1987)
  - Worst Tag Team (1987) with Jimmy Valiant
- Other titles
  - (Montreal) International Tag Team Championship (1 time)
  - SWF Tag Team Championship (1 time) - with Jumping Jack Flash
