= NWA Austra-Asian Tag Team Championship =

Professional wrestling tag team championship

Details
- Promotion: World Championship Wrestling
- Date established: 1972
- Date retired: December 1978
Statistics
- First champion(s): Jimmy Golden and Dennis McCord
- Most reigns: Team: Ron Miller and Larry O'Dea (4); Individual: Larry O'Dea (9)

The NWA Austra-Asian Tag Team Championship was the top tag team professional wrestling title in the Australian World Championship Wrestling promotion from 1972 through the promotion's 1978 closure.

WCW joined the National Wrestling Alliance in August 1969, but still recognized the IWA World Tag Team Championship as its world title. In 1971, that title was abandoned and this title was established as WCW's new top tag team title.

24 different teams held the championship, combining for 29 individual title reigns.

== Title history ==
Key
Symbol	Meaning
No.	The overall championship reign
Reign	The reign number for the specific wrestler listed.
Event	The event in which the championship changed hands
N/A	The specific information is not known
—	Used for vacated reigns in order to not count it as an official reign

No.	Champion	Reign	Date	Days held	Location	Event	Notes	Ref(s).
1	Jimmy Golden and Dennis McCord	1	2 December 1972	(Note: The exact date the championship was lost is uncertain, which means that the championship reign lasted between 30 and 60 days.)	Melbourne	Live event	Defeated Brute Bernard and Gary Hart in the finals of a seven-team tournament.	
2	Don Carson and Dick Dunn	1	January 1973	(Note: The exact date the championship was won is uncertain, which means that the championship reign lasted between 30 and 60 days.)	N/A	Live event	Awarded the title after Golden was injured in the United States.	
3	The Medics (Bob Griffin and Dale Lewis)	1	2 March 1973	7	Sydney	Live event		
4	Don Carson and Dick Dunn	2	9 March 1973	21	Sydney	Live event		
5	Ron Miller and Larry O'Dea	1	30 March 1973	44	Sydney	Live event		
6	Hiro Tojo and Waldo Von Erich	1	13 May 1973	(Note: The exact date the championship was lost is uncertain, which means that the championship reign lasted between 49 and 79 days.)	Sydney	Live event		
7	Spiros Arion and Mark Lewin	1	July 1973	(Note: The exact date the championship was won is uncertain, which means that the championship reign lasted between 80 and 110 days.)	N/A	Live event		
8	Hiro Tojo (2) and Hito Tojo	1	19 October 1973	112	Sydney	Live event		
9	Ron MIller and Larry O'Dea	2	8 February 1974	(Note: The exact date the championship was vacated is uncertain, which means that the championship reign lasted between 1 and 56 days.)	Sydney	Live event		
—	Vacated	—	1974	—	N/A	N/A	Championship was vacated after Ron Miller was injured by Ciclón Negro and Waldo Von Erich.	
10	Pat Barett and Tony Kontellis	1	5 April 1974	14	Sydney	Live event	Won a tournament.	
11	The Original Mr. Wrestling and Bobby Shane	1	19 April 1974	77	Sydney	Live event		
12	Ron Miller and Larry O'Dea	3	5 July 1974	308	Sydney	Live event		
13	The Missouri Mauler and Steve Rackman	1	9 May 1975	23	Sydney	Live event		
14	Bobby Hart and Larry O'Dea (4)	1	1 June 1975	61	Sydney	Live event		
15	Skandor Akbar and George Gouliovas	1	1 August 1975	(Note: The exact date the championship was vacated is uncertain, which means that the championship reign lasted between 1 and 152 days.)	Sydney	Live event		
—	Vacated	—	1975	—	N/A	N/A	Championship was vacated after Skandor Akbar was injured by The Great Mephisto.	
16	Johnny Gray and Ron Miller (4)	1	December 1975	(Note: The exact date the championship was won and lost is uncertain, which means that the championship reign lasted between 61 and 121 days.)	Melbourne	Live event	Won a tournament.	
17	Les Roberts and Hiro Tojo (3)	1	March 1976	(Note: The exact date the championship was won and lost is uncertain, which means that the championship reign lasted between 1 and 91 days.)	N/A	Live event		
18	Johnny Gray (2) and Kevin Martin	1	May 1976 (nlt)	(Note: The exact date the championship was won and lost is uncertain, which means that the championship reign lasted between 93 and 213 days.)	Brisbane	Live event		
19	Larry O'Dea (5) and Ed Wiskoski	1	September 1976	(Note: The exact date the championship was won is uncertain, which means that the championship reign lasted between 141 and 170 days.)	N/A	Live event		
20	Rick Martel and Larry O'Dea (6)	1	18 February 1977	(Note: The exact date the championship was lost is uncertain, which means that the championship reign lasted between 1 and 73 days.)	Sydney	Live event	Defeated Masa Saito and Ed Wiskoski.	
21	Butcher Brannigan and Bugsy McGraw	1	1977	(Note: The exact date the championship was lost is uncertain, which means that the championship reign lasted between 1 and 73 days.)	N/A	Live event		
22	Ron Miller (5) and Larry O'Dea (7)	4	2 May 1977	46	Sydney	Live event		
23	Butcher Brannigan (2) and Killer Karl Krupp	1	17 June 1977	107	Sydney	Live event		
24	Bugsy McGraw (2) and Mario Milano	1	2 October 1977	(Note: The exact date the championship was vacated is uncertain, which means that the championship reign lasted between 1 and 152 days.)	Sydney	Live event		
—	Vacated	—	1977/1978	—	N/A	N/A	Championship was vacated after Mario Milano was injured by Bruiser Brody.	
25	Bobby Hart and Larry O'Dea (8)	2	3 March 1978	(Note: The exact date the championship was vacated is uncertain, which means that the championship reign lasted between 1 and 180 days.)	Sydney	Live event		
—	Vacated	—	April 1978	—	N/A	N/A	Championship vacated when Bobby Hart left the country.	
26	Butcher Brannigan (2) and Les Roberts (2)	1	August 1978	(Note: The exact date the championship was won is uncertain, which means that the championship reign lasted between 32 and 61 days.)	Papua New Guinea	Live event	Won a tournament; possibly fictitious.	
27	Mario Milano (2) and Larry O'Dea (9)	1	1 October 1978	26	Sydney	Live event		
28	Ox Baker and Butcher Brannigan (3)	1	27 October 1978	42	Sydney	Live event		
29	André the Giant and Ron Miller (6)	1	8 December 1978	(Note: The exact date the championship was won/lost is uncertain, which means that the championship reign lasted between 1 and 13 days.)	Sydney	Live event		
—	Abandoned	—	December 1978	—	N/A	N/A	World Championship Wrestling closed.	

== See also ==
- Professional wrestling in Australia
- World Championship Wrestling
