= Jack Brisco =

American wrestler (1941–2010)

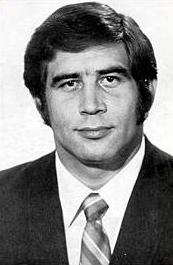
- Brisco in 1973

Personal information
- Born: Freddie Joe Brisco; September 21, 1941 Seminole, Oklahoma, U.S.
- Died: February 1, 2010 (aged 68) Tampa, Florida, U.S.
- Cause of death: Complications from cardiac surgery
- Education: Oklahoma State University
- Family: Gerald Brisco (brother); Wes Brisco (nephew)

Professional wrestling career
- Ring name(s): Jack Brisco; Tiger Brisco; Uvalde Slim
- Billed height: 6 ft 1 in (185 cm)
- Billed weight: 234 lb (106 kg)
- Billed from: Blackwell, Oklahoma
- Trained by: Leroy McGuirk
- Debut: May 15, 1965
- Retired: February 28, 1985
- Sports career
Medal record
Collegiate Wrestling
Representing the Oklahoma State Cowboys
NCAA Division I Championships
Gold medal – first place	1965 Laramie	191 lb
Silver medal – second place	1964 Ithaca	191 lb

Freddie Joe "Jack" Brisco (September 21, 1941 – February 1, 2010) was an American amateur wrestler and professional wrestler. As an amateur for Oklahoma State, Brisco was two-time All-American and won the NCAA Division I national championship. He turned pro shortly after and performed for various territories of the National Wrestling Alliance (NWA), becoming a two-time NWA World Heavyweight Champion, and multi-time NWA World Tag Team Champion with his brother Gerald Brisco.

Brisco is considered one of the greatest wrestlers of his era. Legendary champion Lou Thesz described him as "one of the toughest and most highly skilled wrestlers of the last 50 years". Don Leo Jonathan called him "probably the greatest champion of the 20th century." In the late 1970s, the Brisco brothers discovered Terry Bollea, the future wrestling legend best known as Hulk Hogan, whom they introduced to Hiro Matsuda for training.

== Early life ==
Freddie Joe Brisco was born in Seminole, Oklahoma, one of five siblings. He and his family were members of the Chickasaw Nation. He was raised mainly in Blackwell, and grew up as a fan of professional wrestling, and particularly a fan of Lou Thesz, Danny Hodge and Dick Hutton.

Brisco started wrestling at Blackwell High School and was a three-time Oklahoma state champion. He was also an all-state fullback on the high school football team.

== Amateur wrestling career ==
Brisco was followed by his younger brother, Gerald, into sport wrestling and turned down a football scholarship at University of Oklahoma to go to Oklahoma State. During his junior year in 1964, he was NCAA runner-up in the 191 lbs weight class. In 1965, he improved on his finish, and by doing so became the first Native American to win an NCAA Wrestling National Championship. During this senior campaign, he wasn't taken down once during the entire season.

== Professional wrestling career ==
=== Early years (1965–1969) ===
Brisco grew up idolizing Danny Hodge and wanted to be a professional wrestler. Hodge had ties to Leroy McGuirk, a local promoter who contacted Brisco in his senior year. McGuirk helped Brisco get started in his professional wrestling career, leading to Brisco wrestling Ronnie Garvin for his first match. At the start of his career, he wrestled around Oklahoma for around a year then he went to the Tennessee territory to work for Nick Gulas for four weeks. Brisco returned to Oklahoma then went on to have stints in Texas and Australia.

Brisco's first documented professional wrestling championship reign began on October 16, 1965, when he defeated Don Kent to win the NWA Missouri Junior Heavyweight Championship. He held the belt for less than a month, and regained it in November by defeating Kent again. Around this time, Brisco also wrestled for NWA Tri-State. While there, he won a couple of state titles (the Oklahoma Heavyweight Championship and the Arkansas Heavyweight Championship). He also won his first tag team title in this promotion, teaming with Haystacks Calhoun for his first reign as co-holder of the Tri-State version of the NWA United States Tag Team Championship. He later held the title again, as he teamed with Gorgeous George, Jr. to win the belts on May 9, 1967.

=== National Wrestling Alliance (1969–1984) ===
==== Championship Wrestling from Florida (1969–1972) ====
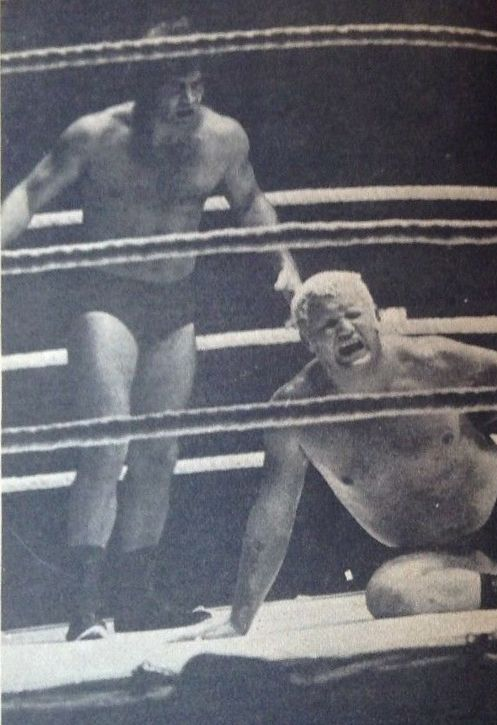
Brisco (left) in June 1973

Brisco then moved to the Florida area, where he wrestled for Championship Wrestling from Florida for several years. His first title there was the NWA Florida Southern Heavyweight Championship, which he won on February 11, 1969, by defeating The Missouri Mauler. He dropped the title to the Mauler and regained it on July 8. Two weeks later, he won the first of an eventual ten NWA Florida Tag Team Championships, with Ciclon Negro. Although he and Negro dropped the tag team belts the following month, Brisco held the Southern Heavyweight Title until November 1969, when he left the area to wrestle in Japan and Australia.

When Brisco returned to Florida, he began teaming with his brother, who he had trained in professional wrestling. He also continued competing as a singles wrestler, winning the NWA Florida Television Championship on November 27, 1970. On February 16, 1971, the Briscos teamed up to win the NWA Florida Tag Team Championship. They dropped the belts the next month to Dory Funk, Jr. and Terry Funk and regained them from the Funks in April. That month, Brisco also beat Terry Funk in a singles match to win the NWA Florida Television Championship again. Brisco's next major success was regaining the Southern Heavyweight Championship from Dick Murdoch on June 8, 1971. The title was later held up after a controversial rematch with Murdoch.

Brisco then took a short break from Florida wrestling to work for Mid-Atlantic Championship Wrestling. While there, he won the NWA Eastern States Heavyweight Championship twice by defeating The Missouri Mauler and Rip Hawk.

Upon his return to Florida, he quickly won the NWA Florida Brass Knuckles Championship from Paul Jones on June 13, 1972, and vacated it the same day. He then won his third and final Television Championship on November 7, 1972. Nine days later, he won the Tag Team Championship, again with his brother.

==== NWA World Heavyweight Champion (1973–1975) ====
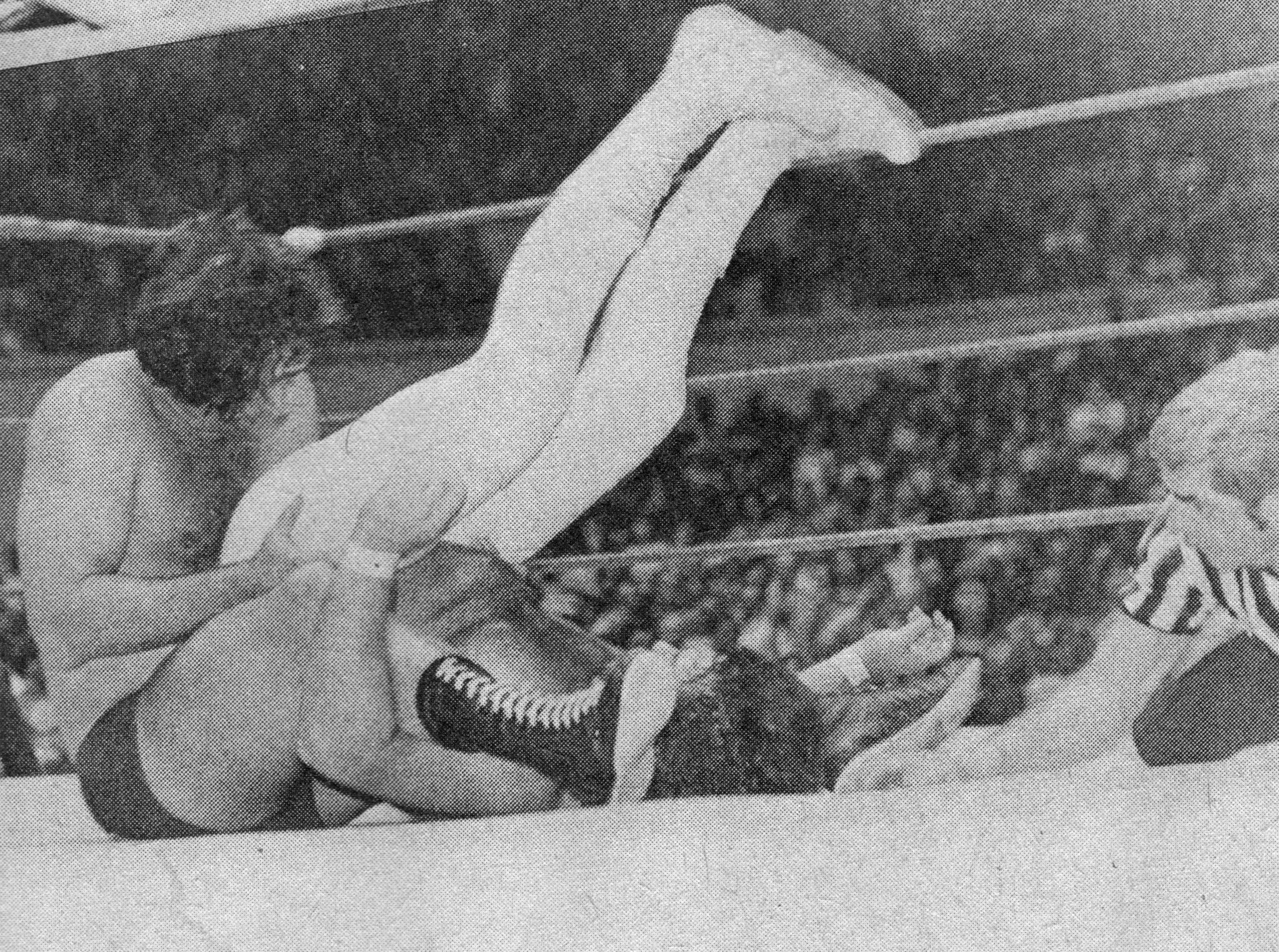
Brisco attempting to pin Jerry Lawler while defending the NWA World Heavyweight title at the Mid-South Coliseum in Memphis, Tennessee in 1975

Brisco's first NWA World Heavyweight Championship win was scheduled to be over Dory Funk Jr., capping off a multi-year feud. However, Dory claimed to be injured in a truck accident and missed the scheduled date. Brisco and Terry Funk were sent out to make the bookings that were already scheduled for Brisco, and Dory later lost the title to Harley Race. Brisco and several others within the NWA power structure always questioned the legitimacy of the accident, claiming Dory Funk Sr. did not want his son to lose to a "pure" wrestler and harm his credibility Brisco won the title from Race after a brief reign, in Houston, Texas, on July 20, 1973. He defended the championship in NWA-affiliated promotions across the world facing top names like Johnny Valentine, Stan Stasiak, Abdullah The Butcher, Gene Kiniski, The Sheik and Bobby Shane until losing to Giant Baba on December 4, 1974. He regained it four days later. Brisco then defended the title until losing it to Terry Funk on December 10, 1975. His loss continued the extensive feud between the Briscos and Funks, which went on for several more years. During his initial reign as champion, Brisco toured Australia where he successfully defended his title against local favorite, Spiros Arion.

==== Various territories (1976–1977) ====
In 1976, Brisco wrestled in several promotions and continued to add to his list of titles. He won the Memphis version of the NWA Southern Heavyweight Championship on August 10, 1976, by defeating local favorite Jerry Lawler. He won the NWA Missouri Heavyweight Championship from Bob Backlund on November 26. At this time, the Briscos were also awarded the ESA International Tag Team Championship, although they did not wrestle as a team in the area.

==== Return to CWF (1977–1978) ====
Wrestling in Florida again, Brisco teamed with his brother to win several more championships. In 1977, they defeated Bob Orton, Jr. and Bob Roop for the NWA Florida Tag Team Championship. They lost the title to Ox Baker and Superstar Billy Graham and soon regained it in a rematch. On January 25, 1978, they won the belts again by defeating Ivan Koloff and Mr. Saito. While holding these belts, they also won the NWA Florida United States Tag Team Championship on February 21, from Mike Graham and Steve Keirn. They dropped the United States tag belts back to Graham and Keirn but soon regained them. They were defeated for the United States title by Killer Karl Kox and Bobby Duncum, and were again successful in regaining it in a rematch. The same thing happened when the Briscos faced Mr. Saito and Mr. Sato that year: they lost the belts and quickly won them back. The Briscos also defeated Saito and Sato to regain the NWA Florida Tag Team Championship. The following year, another victory over Saito and Sato earned the Briscos their final United States Tag Team Championship reign.

==== Georgia Championship Wrestling (1978–1980) ====
The Briscos also had success in Georgia Championship Wrestling, where they won the NWA Georgia Tag Team Championship twice. They competed in a tournament for the tag team belts and finished in second place after a loss to the Funks. They defeated the Funks for the belts two months later. On November 25, 1979, the Briscos defeated Austin Idol and The Masked Superstar to win the belts a second time. Jack gave up his share of the title, however, to Ole Anderson. Later that year, Brisco became the first NWA National Heavyweight Champion by defeating Terry Funk in a tournament final.

==== Second return to CWF (1980–1982) ====
In 1980, Brisco resumed wrestling in Florida. He won the NWA Florida Tag Team Championship again, teaming with Jimmy Garvin this time. After losing the belts, Brisco teamed with his brother to win them for a final time.

In 1981, Brisco won his final Southern Heavyweight Championship by defeating Bobby Jaggers. He finished his time in Florida with two reigns as co-holder of Florida's version of the NWA North American Tag Team Championship. He and his brother won a tournament to win their first title, defeating Assassin #1 and Bobby Jaggers in the finals. They lost the belts to the Funks on January 9, 1982, and regained them in a rematch one week later.

==== Puerto Rico and Mid-Atlantic (1981–1984) ====
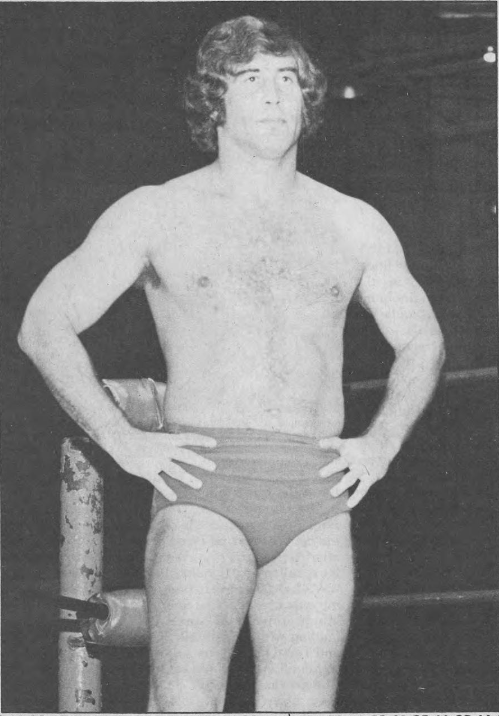
Brisco, c. 1982

Brisco also wrestled in Puerto Rico in 1981, for the World Wrestling Council. He won the WWC Caribbean Heavyweight Championship on May 30, and held it for almost seven months. He teamed with his brother to win the WWC North American Tag Team Championship from Los Pastores (better known as The Bushwhackers) on August 8, holding it for six weeks before dropping it to The Fabulous Kangaroos. Brisco also returned to Missouri in 1981, defeating Ted DiBiase to win a second NWA Missouri Heavyweight Championship. He held the belt for three weeks before losing it to Ken Patera.

In 1982, Brisco returned to Mid-Atlantic Championship Wrestling. He regained the NWA Mid-Atlantic Heavyweight Championship (formerly called the NWA Eastern States Heavyweight Championship) by defeating Roddy Piper on May 10, 1982. He dropped the title back to Piper on July 7 and regained it in August. After his matches with Piper, Brisco traded the title back and forth with Paul Jones several times. He lost the belt to Jones on September 1 and won it back on October 18. Jones won the belt again a week later, and dropped it back to Brisco in November.

Brisco teamed with his brother to win the Mid-Atlantic version of the NWA World Tag Team Championship three times. As heels, they beat Ricky Steamboat and Jay Youngblood for the belts on June 18, 1983. This set up a rivalry in which the belts switched hands several times. Steamboat and Youngblood regained the belts on October 3, but the Briscos won them back on October 21. They held the title for a little over a month before dropping it back to Steamboat and Youngblood. The Briscos again won the belts the following year, from Wahoo McDaniel and Mark Youngblood.

=== World Wrestling Federation (1984–1985) ===
The Briscos acquired minority interests in Georgia Championship Wrestling and, in 1984, convinced a majority (52%) of the shareholders to sell their shares to Vince McMahon, enabling him to increase his dominance of the professional wrestling world. The popular story that the Briscos were offered lifetime jobs with the WWF in exchange for selling their interests in Georgia Championship Wrestling was refuted by Jack Brisco in a 1996 interview for Wrestling Perspective.

On December 28, 1984, the Briscos challenged the North-South Connection (Adrian Adonis and Dick Murdoch) for the WWF Tag Team Championship in Madison Square Garden. The match ended in a double count-out, and was Jack Brisco's last high-profile bout.

Jack left the business entirely in February 1985, at the age of 43, after becoming disillusioned with the direction of the sport, citing a lack of amateur wrestlers in the professional ranks and the growing reliance on soap opera storylines.

== Post retirement and death ==
Brisco was inducted into the Professional Wrestling Hall of Fame in 2005. Brisco lived in Florida where he ran the Brisco Brothers Body Shop with brothers Gerald and Bill for over 30 years. He has also made occasional wrestling appearances such as Florida's Wrestle Reunion in January 2005. Brisco is considered one of the great legendary wrestlers of the 1970s and has often been cited as such by Ric Flair during his emotional promos. Brisco and his brother Gerald were inducted into the WWE Hall of Fame Class of 2008.

Over the final few years of his life Jack suffered from bouts of pneumonia and back problems. He had been a heavy smoker. On February 1, 2010, Brisco died at the age of 68 from complications of open heart surgery. He was survived by his wife of over 30 years. At the time of his death, he was being treated under the care of his friend, fellow retired wrestler-turned-nurse Bugsy McGraw.

== Championships and accomplishments ==
=== Amateur wrestling ===
- Collegiate/High School
  - Oklahoma State Wrestling Heavyweight Champion (3 times)
- National Collegiate Athletic Association
  - NCAA Division I All-American (1964–1965)
  - NCAA Division I Champion 191 lb (1965)
  - Big Eight Conference Championships (2 times)

=== Professional wrestling ===
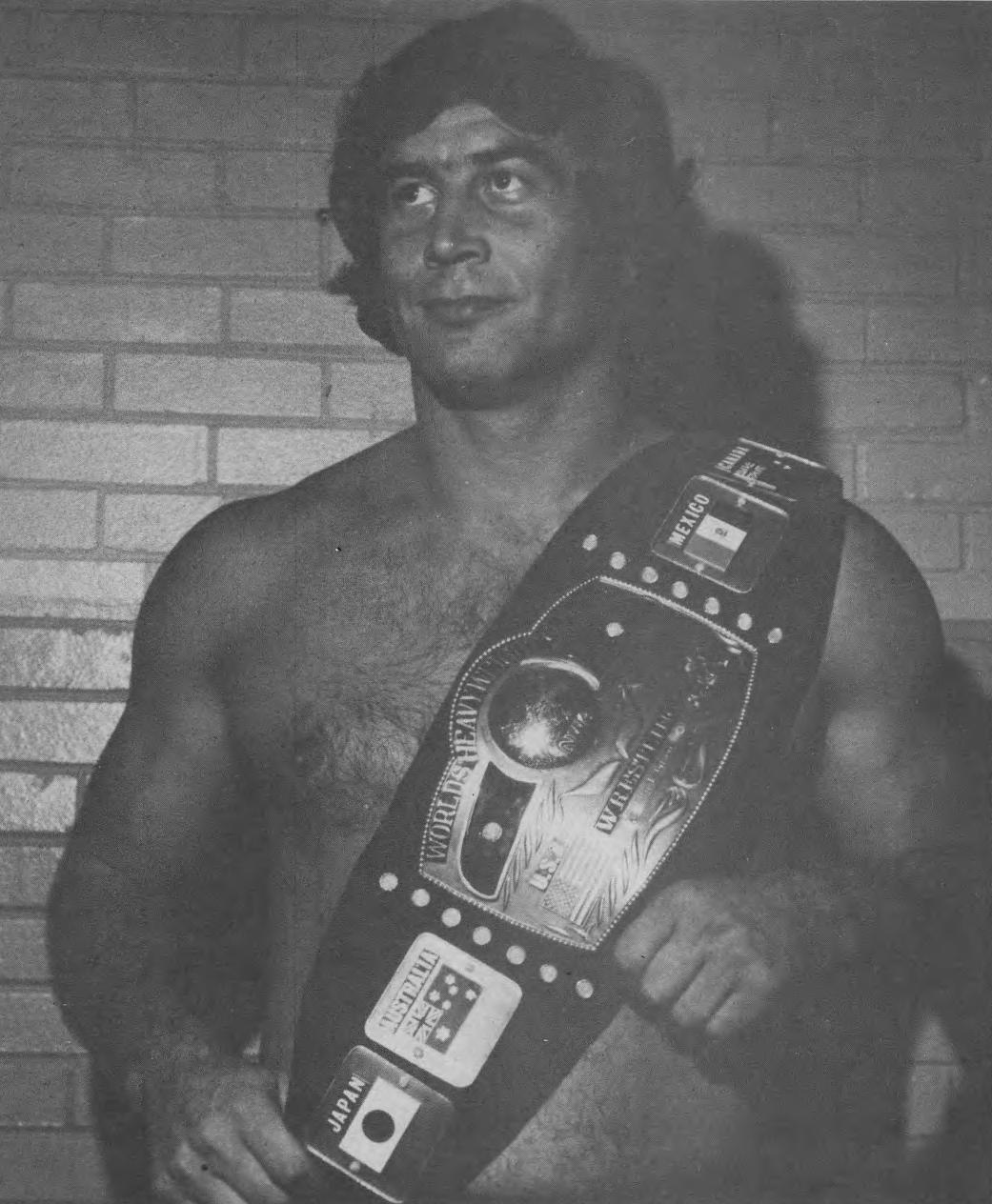
Brisco during his reign as NWA World Heavyweight Champion, wearing the belt over his shoulder.

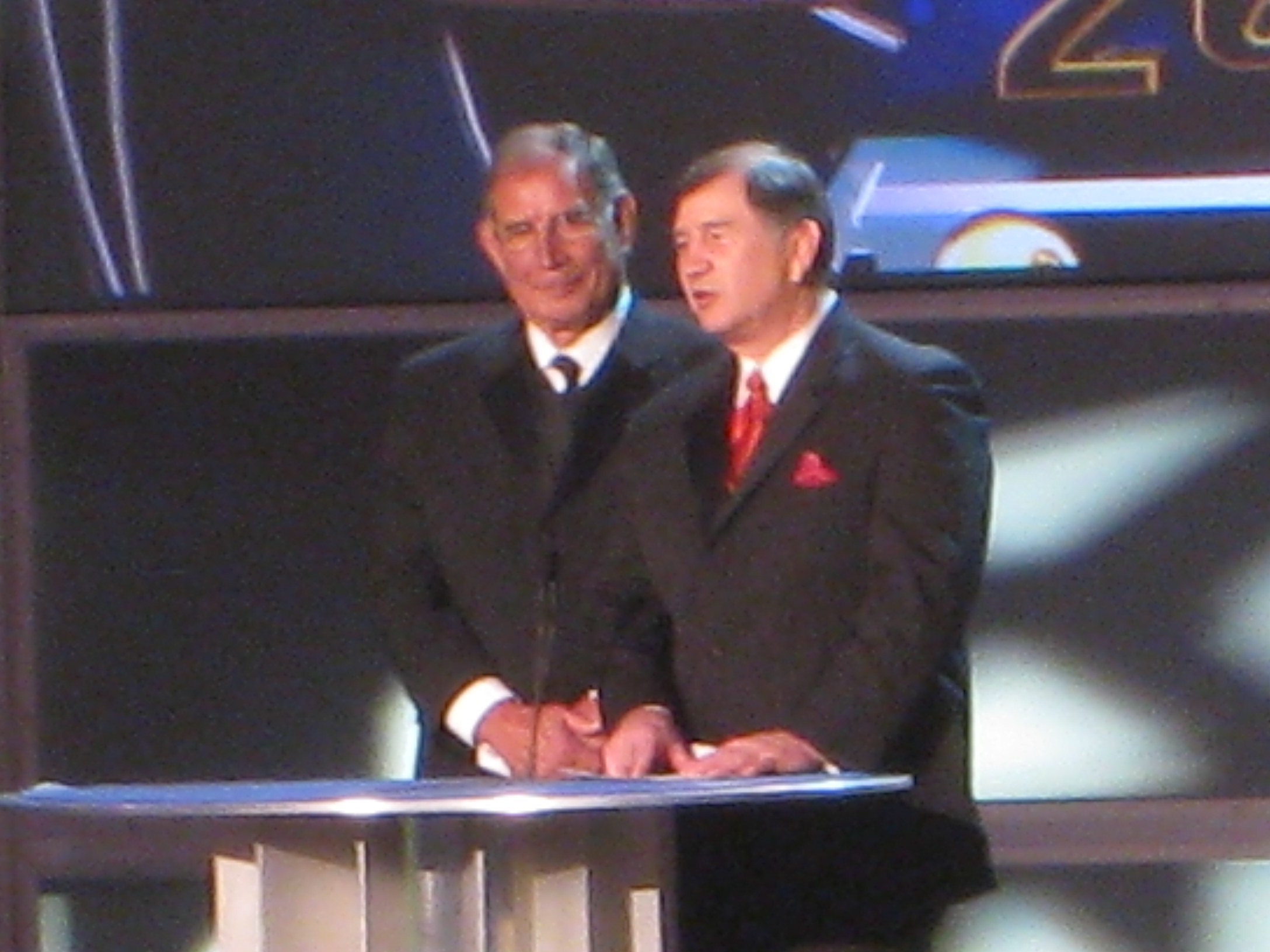
Brisco (left) with his brother Gerald during their WWE Hall of Fame induction ceremony on March 29, 2008

- Cauliflower Alley Club
  - Lou Thesz Award (2005)
  - Other honoree (1996)
- Championship Wrestling from Florida
  - NWA Florida Heavyweight Championship (8 times)
  - NWA Brass Knuckles Championship (Florida version) (1 time)
  - NWA Florida Tag Team Championship (10 times) – with Gerry Brisco (8), Ciclon Negro (1), and Jimmy Garvin (1)
  - NWA Florida Television Championship (3 times)
  - NWA North American Tag Team Championship (Florida version) (2 times) – with Gerry Brisco
  - NWA Southern Heavyweight Championship (Florida version) (4 times)
  - NWA United States Tag Team Championship (Florida version) (5 times) – with Gerry Brisco
- Eastern Sports Association
  - ESA International Tag Team Championship (1 time) - with Gerry Brisco
- George Tragos/Lou Thesz Professional Wrestling Hall of Fame
  - Class of 2001
- Georgia Championship Wrestling
  - NWA Georgia Tag Team Championship (2 times) – with Gerry Brisco
  - NWA National Heavyweight Championship (1 time)
- Gulf Coast Championship Wrestling
  - NWA Gulf Coast Louisiana Championship (1 time)
- International Professional Wrestling Hall of Fame
  - Class of 2024
- Mid-Atlantic Championship Wrestling
  - NWA Eastern States Heavyweight Championship (2 times)
  - NWA Mid-Atlantic Heavyweight Championship (4 times)
  - NWA World Tag Team Championship (Mid-Atlantic version) (3 times) – with Gerry Brisco
- National Wrestling Alliance
  - NWA World Heavyweight Championship (2 times)
  - Champion Carnival Technique Prize (1981)
  - NWA Hall of Fame (class of 2010)
- NWA Mid-America
  - NWA Southern Heavyweight Championship (Memphis version) (1 time)
- NWA Tri-State
  - NWA Arkansas Heavyweight Championship (1 time)
  - NWA Oklahoma Heavyweight Championship x1
  - NWA United States Tag Team Championship (Tri-State version) (2 times) – with Haystacks Calhoun (1) and Gorgeous George, Jr. (1)
- Pro Wrestling Illustrated
  - PWI Match of the Year (1974) vs. Dory Funk, Jr. on January 27
  - PWI Most Popular Wrestler of the Year (1972) tied with Fred Curry
  - PWI Wrestler of the Year (1973)
  - PWI Stanley Wetson Award (2017)
  - PWI ranked him # 54 of the 100 best tag teams during the "PWI Years" with Gerry Brisco in 2003.
  - PWI ranked him #67 of the top 500 singles wrestlers of the "PWI Years" in 2003
- Professional Wrestling Hall of Fame and Museum
  - Class of 2005
- St. Louis Wrestling Club
  - NWA Missouri Heavyweight Championship (2 times)
  - NWA Missouri Junior Heavyweight Championship (2 times)
- St. Louis Wrestling Hall of Fame
  - Class of 2008
- World Wrestling Council
  - WWC Caribbean Heavyweight Championship (1 time)
  - WWC North American Tag Team Championship (1 time) – with Gerry Brisco
- World Wrestling Entertainment
  - WWE Hall of Fame (Class of 2008)
- Wrestling Observer Newsletter
  - Wrestling Observer Newsletter Hall of Fame (Class of 1996)
  - Wrestling Observer Newsletter Hall of Fame (2023) - with Gerald Brisco
