= NWA Florida Television Championship =

Professional wrestling championship

Details
- Promotion: Championship Wrestling from Florida
- Date established: November 21, 1956
- Date retired: February 1987
Statistics
- First champion: Ray Stevens
- Final champion: Lex Luger
- Most reigns: Jack Brisco (4 reigns)

The NWA Florida Television Championship was a secondary title in Championship Wrestling from Florida. It existed from 1970 until 1987.

== Title history ==
Key
No.	Overall reign number
Reign	Reign number for the specific champion
Days	Number of days held
N/A	Unknown information

No.	Champion	Championship change			Reign statistics		Notes	Ref.
No.	Champion	Date	Event	Location	Reign	Days	Notes	Ref.
1	Ray Stevens	November 21, 1956	CWF show	Tampa, Florida	1	(Note: The length of this championship is too uncertain to calculate.)	Defeated Harry Smith to become the first champion.	
Championship history is unrecorded from November 21, 1956 to October 29, 1970.
2	Tarzan Tyler	October 29, 1970	CWF show	Tampa, Florida	1	29	Defeated Jack Brisco in tournament final.	
3	Jack Brisco	November 27, 1970	CWF show	Tampa, Florida	1	51		
4	Tarzan Tyler	January 17, 1971	CWF show	Tampa, Florida	2	(Note: The date the championship was vacated is uncertain, which means the reign lasted between 43 and 59 days.)	Tyler wins the title in the first fall of a best-of-three falls match in which his NWA Florida Heavyweight Championship is also on the line; Brisco wins the next two falls to take the Florida title from Tyler	
—	Vacated	March 1971	—	—	—	—	Tarzan Tyler was suspended and had to give back the championship	
5	Terry Funk	March 18, 1971	CWF show	Tampa, Florida	1	33	Defeated Buddy Austin in tournament as The Masked Texan but unmasks after match.	
6	Jack Brisco	April 20, 1971	CWF show	Tampa, Florida	2	240		
7	Ole Anderson	December 16, 1971	CWF show	Tampa, Florida	1	7		
8	Bob Roop	December 23, 1971	CWF show	Tampa, Florida	1	12		
9	Bobby Shane	January 4, 1972	CWF show	Tampa, Florida	1	58		
—	Vacated	March 2, 1972	—	—	—	—	Championship vacated when Bobby Shane refused to wrestle on televised shows	
10	Paul Jones	April 18, 1972	CWF show	Tampa, Florida	1	(Note: The date the championship was vacated is uncertain, which means the reign lasted between 136 and 162 days.)	Defeated Johnny Walker in tournament final.	
—	Vacated	September 1972	N/A	N/A	—	—	Jones attempted to retire the championship without losing it.	
11	Tim Woods	September 28, 1972	CWF show	Tampa, Florida	1	21	Defeated Jack Brisco by default in the tournament final.	
12	Bobby Shane	October 19, 1972	CWF show	Tampa, Florida	2	19		
13	Jack Brisco	November 7, 1972	CWF show	Tampa, Florida	3	209		
14	Gorgeous George Jr.	June 4, 1973	CWF show	Orlando, Florida	1	(Note: The date the championship was wont is uncertain, which means the reign lasted between 1 and 706 days.)		
15	Jack Brisco	June 1973	CWF show	N/A	4	(Note: The date the championship was won is uncertain, which means the reign lasted between 1 and 707 days.)		
16	Buddy Colt	June 30, 1973	CWF show	St. Petersburg, Florida	1	17		
17	Paul Jones	July 17, 1973	CWF show	Tampa, Florida	2	30		
18	Great Mephisto	August 16, 1973	CWF show	Jacksonville, Florida	1	82		
19	Dick Slater	November 6, 1973	CWF show	Tampa, Florida	1	21		
20	Mike Graham	November 27, 1973	CWF show	Tampa, Florida	1	476		
21	J. J. Dillon	March 18, 1975	CWF show	Tampa, Florida	1	135		
22	Rocky Johnson	July 31, 1975	CWF show	Jacksonville, Florida	1	173		
23	The Missouri Mauler	January 20, 1976	CWF show	Tampa, Florida	1	273		
24	Tommy Seigler	October 19, 1976	CWF show	Tampa, Florida	1	21		
25	The Assassin	November 9, 1976	CWF show	Tampa, Florida	1	23		
26	Mike Graham	December 2, 1976	CWF show	Jacksonville, Florida	2	169		
27	Pat Patterson	May 20, 1977	CWF show	Tallahassee, Florida	1	95		
28	Pedro Morales	August 23, 1977	CWF show	Tampa, Florida	1	(Note: The date the championship was lost is uncertain, which means the reign lasted between 221 and 250 days.)		
29	Dick Slater	April 1978	CWF show	Florida	2	(Note: The date the championship was lost is uncertain, which means the reign lasted between 368 and 397 days.)		
30	Jerry Brisco	May 3, 1978	CWF show	Florida	1	119		
31	Bobby Duncum	August 30, 1978	CWF show	Miami, Florida	1	(Note: The date the championship was lost is uncertain, which means the reign lasted between 1 and 31 days.)		
32	Dusty Rhodes	September 1978	CWF show	Florida	1	(Note: The date the championship was won is uncertain, which means the reign lasted between 1 and 29 days.)		
33	Bugsy McGraw	September 1978	CWF show	Florida	1	(Note: The date the championship was won is uncertain, which means the reign lasted between 1 and 29 days.)		
Championship history is unrecorded from September 1978 to January 1979.
34	Dusty Rhodes	January 1979	CWF show	Florida	2			
Championship history is unrecorded from January 1979 to September 11, 1979.
35	Bugsy McGraw	September 11, 1979	CWF show	Tampa, Florida	2	174		
36	Steve Keirn	March 3, 1980	CWF show	West Palm Beach, Florida	1	64		
37	Masa Saito	May 6, 1980	CWF show	Tampa, Florida	1	81		
38	Barry Windham	July 26, 1980	CWF show	St. Petersburg, Florida	1	(Note: The date the championship was won/lost is uncertain, which means the reign lasted between 6 and 35 days.)		
39	Super Destroyer	August 1980	CWF show	Florida	1	(Note: The date the championship was wont is uncertain, which means the reign lasted between 3 and 33 days.)		
40	Barry Windham	September 3, 1980	CWF show	Miami, Florida	2	84		
41	Baron Von Raschke	November 26, 1980	CWF show	Hollywood, Florida	1	(Note: The date the championship was lost is uncertain, which means the reign lasted between 95 and 3,269 days.)		
42	Manny Fernandez	March 1981	CWF show	Florida	1	(Note: The date the championship was won is uncertain, which means the reign lasted between 31 and 61 days.)		
43	Don Muraco	May 1, 1981	CWF show	Orlando, Florida	1	25		
44	Gran Apollo	May 26, 1981	CWF show	Tampa, Florida	1	104		
45	Dory Funk Jr.	September 7, 1981	CWF show	Tampa, Florida	1	9		
46	Tommy Gilbert	September 16, 1981	CWF show	Florida	1	(Note: The date the championship was lost is uncertain, which means the reign lasted between 15 and 45 days.)		
47	Eddy Mansfield	October 1981	CWF show	Florida	1	(Note: The date the championship was won is uncertain, which means the reign lasted between 32 and 62 days.)		
48	Wahoo McDaniel	December 2, 1981	CWF show	Miami, Florida	1	(Note: The date the championship was vacated is uncertain, which means the reign lasted between 1 and 24 days.)		
—	Vacated	December 1981	—	—	—	—	Championship was vacated for undocumented reasons	
49	Eric Embry	December 26, 1981	CWF show	St. Petersburg, Florida	1	21	Won a tournament.	
50	Ray Stevens	January 16, 1982	CWF show	St. Petersburg, Florida	2	(Note: The date the championship was lost is uncertain, which means the reign lasted between 75 and 97 days.)		
51	Sweet Brown Sugar	April 1982	CWF show	Florida	1	(Note: The date the championship was won is uncertain, which means the reign lasted between 1 and 3,675 days.)		
52	David Von Erich	April 24, 1982	CWF show	Florida	1			
53	Dory Funk Jr.	1982	CWF show	Florida	2			
54	Tommy Gilbert	1982	CWF show	Florida	2			
Championship history is unrecorded from April 1982 to September 16, 1982.
55	Eddy Mansfield	September 16, 1982	CWF show	N/A	2			
—	Vacated	1982	—	—	—	—		
56	Lex Luger	March 12, 1986	CWF show	Tampa, Florida	1	(Note: The date the championship was abandoned is uncertain, which means the reign lasted between 39 and 39 days.)	Defeated Jerry Grey in tournament final.	
—	Deactivated	February 1987	—	—	—	—		
