= World Championship Wrestling (Australia) =

Australian professional wrestling company

- Acronym: WCW
- Founded: 1964
- Defunct: 1978
- Headquarters: Melbourne, Victoria, Australia
- Owner: Jim Barnett

World Championship Wrestling was an Australian professional wrestling promotion that ran from 1964 until 1978.

== History ==
The promotion gained publicity through television programs on the Nine Network, which were presented at noon on Saturdays and Sundays.

An average of 6,500 people attended in the first three months of the promotion's existence, a crowd of 8,000 attended a show on 7 November in Melbourne when the first title change in the new promotion took place as Dominic De Nucci defeated Killer Kowalski for the International Wrestling Alliance World Heavyweight Championship. WCW also promoted throughout Southeast Asia, particularly in Singapore and Hong Kong.

When WCW began operations in 1964, the promotion created the International Wrestling Alliance as a sanctioning body for WCW's original championships, the IWA World Heavyweight and World Tag Team Championships. WCW joined the National Wrestling Alliance in August 1969, but they continued to recognise the IWA World championships until 1971, when they were abandoned in favor of new NWA-sanctioned titles (see below).

In 1978, the Nine Network ceased coverage of WCW; with no TV coverage, promoters were facing financial ruin, leading to the decline of professional wrestling in Australia. The "World Championship Wrestling" name was reused in 1982 by Georgia Championship Wrestling in the United States for its own TV program, which became the roots of the American promotion of the same name. At the time, the promotion's former owner, Jim Barnett, was one of the owners of Georgia Championship Wrestling.

Documentaries about the promotion were released in 2007 called Ruff, Tuff N Real and Over the Top Rope in 2017.

== Roster ==
- Jack Little
- Lord Athol Layton
- Michael Cleary
- Paul Jennings
- Sam Menacker
- Tony Marino
- Ted Whitten
- "Playboy" Gary Hart
- J. J. Dillon
- Michael Hunt
- Bob McMaster

=== Wrestlers ===
- Abdullah the Butcher
- Alex Iakovidis
- Allan Pinfold
- "Amazing Antonino Argentino" Rocca
- André the Giant
- Andreas Lambrakis
- Angelo "Little Jumping Joe" Savoldi
- Antonio Pugliese
- Apache Bull Ramos
- Art Nelson
- Big Bad John
- Blackjack Slade
- Brute Bernard
- Bugsy McGraw
- Bulldog Brower
- Bruiser Brody
- Bruno Sammartino
- Butcher Brannigan
- Bobby Shane
- Bob Ragan
- Bob Roop
- Ciclón Negro
- Chief Big Heart
- Chief Billy White Wolf
- Clyde Steeves
- Con Dandos
- Con Tolios
- “Cowboy” Bob Ellis
- Czaya Nandor
- Dale Lewis
- Dennis McCord
- Dennis Stamp
- Dick Dunn
- Dick Murdoch
- Dick Steinborn
- Dominic DeNucci
- Don Carson
- Donna Christianello
- Dr. Jerry Graham
- Dusty Rhodes
- Efride Dengler
- El Greco
- Evelyn Stevens
- Fred Blassie
- George Barnes
- George Gouliovas
- George Julio
- George Lackey
- George Trikilis
- The Golden Terror
- The Great Mephisto
- Hans Schroeder
- Harley Race
- "Haystacks" Calhoun
- Jack Claybourne
- Jack Brisco
- Jerry Brisco
- Jan Jansen
- Jimmy Golden
- John da Silva
- John Tolios
- Johnny Gray
- Kevin Martin
- Ken Medlin
- Kid Hardy
- Killer Karl Kox
- Killer Kowalski
- King Curtis Iaukea
- Larry Hennig
- Larry O'Dea
- Lars Anderson
- Len Holt
- Lenny Hayter
- Les Roberts
- Lorenzo Parente
- Lou Liotta
- Mario Milano
- Mark Lewin
- Max Steyne
- Max Tamboola
- Michael Cleary
- The Missouri Mauler
- Moose Morowski
- Murphy the Surfie
- Mr. Fuji
- Mr Wrestling
- Nikita Kalmikoff
- Ox Baker
- Pat Barrett Paddy
- Pat Patterson
- Paulette Giret
- Peter Scalise
- Peter Spence
- "Playboy" Gary Hart
- Ray Stevens
- Red Bastien
- Ricky Wallace
- Ripper Collins
- Ron Miller
- Roy Heffernan
- Sheik Wadi Ayoub
- Skandor Akbar
- Skull Murphy
- Sonny Dalton
- Spike Robson
- Spiros Arion
- The Spoiler
- Steve Hardy
- Steve Rackman
- The Medics (Bob Griffin and Dale Lewis)
- Tiger Singh
- Tex McKenzie
- The Tojo Brothers (Hiro 'The Great' Tojo and Hito Tojo)
- Tony Kontellis
- Tony Parisi
- The Von Steiger Brothers
- Waldo Von Erich
- Ron Fuller

== Championships ==
Championship:	Final champion(s):	Active From:	Active Till:	Notes:
IWA-sanctioned championships
IWA World Heavyweight Championship	King Curtis Iaukea	October 1964	1971	WCW joined the NWA in August 1969, but continued recognizing its own world champion until 1971.
IWA World Tag Team Championship	Kurt and Karl Von Steiger	June 1966	1971	
NWA-sanctioned championships
NWA Austra-Asian Heavyweight Championship	Ron Miller	28 April 1972	December 1978	
NWA Austra-Asian Tag Team Championship	André the Giant and Ron Miller	2 December 1972	December 1978	

== See also ==
- Professional wrestling in Australia
- List of professional wrestling organisations in Australia
