= Professional wrestling in Australia =

Professional wrestling in Australia makes up a small part of Australian culture. Unlike the North American or Japanese products which have large, globally renowned organisations such as WWE, AEW, Consejo Mundial de Lucha Libre or New Japan Pro-Wrestling with several hundred smaller promotions, Australia only has approximately 30 smaller independent circuit promotions which exist in all Australian states and territories. Tours from the North American product are regularly sold out in capital cities such as Adelaide, Brisbane, Melbourne, Perth, and Sydney.

== History ==
Professional wrestling in Australia first gained distinction in the early 1900s, however there were very few shows promoted. Nonetheless, stars such as Clarence Weber, Jack Carkeek, Clarence Whistler and George Hackenschmidt toured the country. As time went on, the sport's popularity began to grow, particularly in the 1930s as people sought to find relief from The Great Depression.

Throughout the 1940s professional wrestling suffered due to World War II but in the 1950s it reached new highs as many stars from overseas were imported and created larger crowds and, in turn, a larger market. Established names such as Lou Thesz, Dr. Jerry Graham and Gorgeous George toured the country during the decade.

Throughout the 1960s and 1970s, Australia established its only major promotion in WCW Australia. WCW had a television deal with the Nine Network, the first in Australia to do so and attracted crowds between 2,000 and 9,000 people on a weekly basis. International stars such as Killer Kowalski, Ray Stevens, Dominic Denucci, Mario Milano, Spiros Arion, Karl Gotch, Bruno Sammartino, Gorilla Monsoon and local stars Ron Miller and Larry O'Dea were all involved with the promotion which grew steadily through the 1960s and was a well known product in the 1970s. However, with the introduction of World Series Cricket, WCW was left with no television deal and was forced to close down in 1978. This sent the Australian market into a large decline. With no access to any product anywhere in the world, the Australian market was almost dead until the World Wrestling Federation became a prominent figure in professional wrestling in the mid-1980s.

Australia has depended on the North American product since 1985. Hosting tours in 1985 and 1986 kept a solid viewing in the sport through programmes such as Superstars of Wrestling and Saturday Night's Main Event. Small local promotions have tried to take advantage of the popularity of professional wrestling in more recent times, but there has been nothing of note since the demise of World Championship Wrestling in 1978.

However the local scene has been the subject of controversy.

In September 2002, a promotion called Professional Championship Wrestling presented a show at the Rowville Community Centre in which two wrestlers faced off in a contest that used thumbs tacks in a ring surrounded by barbed wire. Melbourne talk back radio received phone calls claiming that the audience was "showered with blood". Despite claims by a promotion spokesman that the event was theatrical, the Professional Boxing and Contact Sports Board investigated on the grounds that such a claim was not enough. Police also investigated and the Knox City Council reviewed the promotion's use of the venue after being led to believe the event was a "family event".

== Australian wrestlers overseas ==
Individual wrestlers originating in Australia struggled for a long time to obtain any international recognition. Perhaps the two biggest names when one mentioned Australia were The Fabulous Kangaroos—Roy Heffernan and Al Costello. They were the only Australian wrestlers to make it big in the United States at the time and held the Florida and Texas versions of the NWA World Tag Team titles as well as the north east version of the NWA United States tag team titles in the Capitol Wrestling Corporation (later to become WWE) on three occasions, as well as being inducted into the Wrestling Observer Newsletter Hall of Fame.

Australian wrestler Peter Stilsbury was brought into the WWF in the mid-1980s under the name Outback Jack in response to the mainstream popularity at the time of the Australian film Crocodile Dundee. He appeared in several vignettes hyping his debut by showing Jack in the wilds of the Australian Outback, drinking beer with cows, and came down to the ring to the theme song by Rolf Harris, "Tie Me Kangaroo Down, Sport". Outback Jack started his career touring in Canada with Stu Hart's Stampede Wrestling.

Early in the new millennium Nathan Jones made two WWE appearances in 2003 at WrestleMania XIX and at Survivor Series later that same year even though he only actually wrestled at the latter event, making him the first Australian wrestler to ever perform on a WWE pay-per-view event. Jones also performed on two World Wrestling All-Stars pay-per-views, losing to Jeff Jarrett at WWA: The Inception and to Scott Steiner at WWA: The Eruption.

It would be in late 2011 that things started to change. WWE signed an Australian female wrestler Tenille Dashwood to its development territory NXT. She was originally from Melbourne. Dashwood debuted as a clumsy dancer Emma, and in early 2014 was elevated to the main roster. On 6 April 2014 she became only the second Australian wrestler to perform on a WWE pay per view and the first ever woman to do so when she was a part of the Diva's Title match at WrestleMania XXX. She later appeared at the 2014 Survivor Series in November. In 2017 she became the first Australian to perform at three WWE pay per view events when she was part of the fatal five way for the Raw Women's Championship at No Mercy. She made it four at TLC in opposition to Asuka. She was released soon after, and worked for Ring of Honor and Impact Wrestling before returning to WWE as the mystery opponent of Ronda Rousey on Smackdown.

In early 2013, WWE signed another Australian wrestler Buddy Murphy, known in Australia as Matt Silva to NXT. Murphy made his televised debut on NXT 15 May 2014, teaming with Elias Samson in a losing effort against The Ascension. In August 2014, Murphy began teaming with American Wesley Blake and in January 2015, Blake and Murphy scored an upset victory over The Vaudevillains and the following week defeated the Lucha Dragons to win the NXT Tag Team Championship, making Murphy the first Australian to hold a championship within the WWE. In early 2018 Murphy joined the Cruiserweight division and participated in the Cruiserweight title tournament losing to Mustafa Ali in the quarter finals. He soon become a top contender to the new champion Cedric Alexander, and he managed to defeat Alexander at WWE Super Show-Down in his main roster pay-per-view debut in his home town Melbourne to win the WWE Cruiserweight Championship. On the 23 February 2022 episode of Dynamite, he made his debut for All Elite Wrestling as Buddy Matthews joining the "House of Black" faction with Malakai Black and Brody King.

In April 2015, WWE signed both Billie Kay and Peyton Royce to NXT. The pair later formed the team The IIconics under their original name of The Iconic Duo. They were elevated to the main roster on the SmackDown brand just after WrestleMania 34 and made their main roster pay per view debut at WWE Super Show-Down with a victory over the team of Asuka and Naomi. After appearances at WWE Evolution, the 2019 Royal Rumble and Elimination Chamber, the IIconics won the WWE Women's Tag Team Championship at WrestleMania 35. On 9 October 2021, The IIconics now using the name The IInspiration signed a contract with Impact Wrestling and will make their debut at Bound for Glory (2021).

In 2016, Mikey Nicholls and Shane Haste signed with WWE, beginning training at the WWE Performance Center in April, and working for NXT. They debuted as TM-61 (Nick Miller and Shane Thorne) in May. They reached their peak in late 2016 making the final of the Dusty Rhodes Tag Team Classic only to be defeated by the Authors of Pain at NXT TakeOver: Toronto. Nicholls would leave at the end of 2018, while Haste would remain until the end of 2021.

In 2017, Rhea Ripley joined WWE and participated in the Mae Young Classic. The Adelaide-based wrestler known locally as Demi Bennett would go on to participate in the second Mae Young Classic in 2018, but at TV tapings in Birmingham, England, Ripley became the first Australian woman to win a WWE controlled title when she defeated fellow Australian Toni Storm in a tournament final to be the inaugural winner of the NXT UK Women's Championship. Ripley consequently made her first pay per view appearance at the 2019 Royal Rumble as a participant of the Women's Royal Rumble match. At Wrestlemania 37 Rhea defeated Asuka to win the Raw Women's Championship

In 2018, Toni Storm signed a WWE NXT UK contract and subsequently won the NXT UK Women's Championship. On 23 July 2021, Toni Storm made her WWE SmackDown debut defeating Zelina Vega.

In 2019, WWE signed Bronson Reed and Brendan Vink, both reporting to WWE NXT. Bronson Reed won his first championship, the NXT North American Championship in May 2021, defeating Johnny Gargano. Brendan made his first WWE Raw appearance in 2020 losing a tag team match against the Street Profits.

On 25 June 2021, Robbie Eagles who currently competes for New Japan Pro Wrestling became the first Australian to win a championship in Japan, defeating El Desperado for the IWGP Junior Heavyweight Championship at Wrestle Grand Slam in Tokyo Dome.

Only two other Australian wrestlers have appeared on a worldwide pay-per-view event to date at all. They are Chuck E. Chaos at WWA: The Eruption who lost to Jerry Lynn, and Mark Mercedes at WWA: The Reckoning who lost to Rick Steiner.

== Foreign tours ==
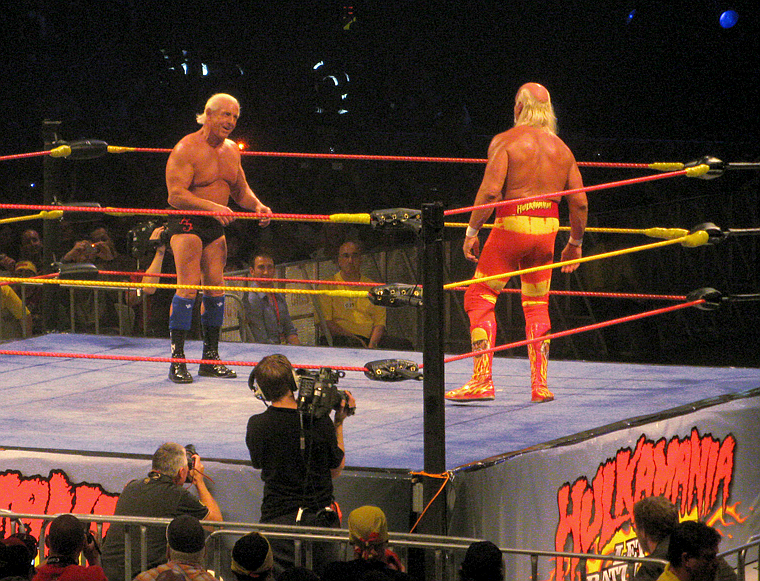
Ric Flair and Hulk Hogan face each other at Hulkamania: Let The Battle Begin in Melbourne's Rod Laver Arena.

Shows from North American promotions have been held in Australia as early as 1985 when the WWF toured three cities, they did a second tour in 1986 across five cities. That was the last Australia saw of a live North American product until WCW did a Nitro and Thunder taping in Melbourne, a Nitro taping in Brisbane and a Thunder taping and a house show in Sydney in 2000.

In 2000, I-Generation Superstars of Wrestling held a pay-per-view in Sydney headlined "Rodman Down Under" where Dennis Rodman would lose to Curt Hennig with the i-Generation Championship being contested. Australia also hosted shows presented by World Wrestling All-Stars, including two pay per views events, The Inception in 2001 from Sydney and The Eruption in 2002 from Melbourne.

After a 16-year hiatus, WWE (previously known at the WWF) returned to Australia for the 2002 WWE Global Warning Tour taped event from Colonial Stadium in Melbourne. Since then, WWE has returned to tour Australia at least once a year with House shows events. In 2016 WWE's developmental brand WWE NXT toured Australia for the first time including a taping a NXT TV episode which aired on WWE Network about one month later. In 2018 WWE held their first Australian live pay-per-view WWE Super Show-Down from the Melbourne Cricket Ground.

2009 saw the first international tour other than WWE since 2002 when Hulk Hogan and Eric Bischoff held the Hulkamania: Let The Battle Begin tour throughout Australia in Melbourne, Perth, Brisbane, and Sydney. Wrestlers included Hulk Hogan (wrestling in Australia for the first time), Ric Flair (who came out of retirement), Spartan-3000, Heidenreich, Eugene, Brutus "The Barber" Beefcake and Orlando Jordan. Despite having ONE HD television cameras present, this event has never been released on DVD.

In 2016, House of Hardcore presented House of Hardcore 15 in Melbourne, before returning in 2017 for a tour of Melbourne, Sydney, Perth, Adelaide, and Brisbane. They returned in 2018 for a tour of Perth, Melbourne, Sydney, and Sunshine Coast, the 2018 tour also saw the NWA World Heavyweight Champion Nick Aldis made four championship defences against Mark Cometti, Jonah Rock, Robbie Eagles and Jack Bonza.

On 9 January 2018, New Japan Pro-Wrestling (NJPW) announced their first Tour of Australia, "New Japan Fallout Down Under" tour in which they would visit Adelaide, Melbourne, Sydney, and Perth. The events took place between "The New Beginning in Osaka" and "Honor Rising: Japan 2018" on the NJPW calendar. Announced for the tour was Kenny Omega, Kazuchika Okada, Minoru Suzuki, Cody, Matt and Nick Jackson, Yuji Nagata, Tomohiro Ishii, Kushida, Evil, Bad Luck Fale, Sanada, Will Ospreay^, Tanga Loa, Juice Robinson, Tama Tonga, Lance Archer, Chase Owens, Rocky Romero, and Toa Henare. Will Ospreay only appeared on the Sydney and Perth legs, while Hiroshi Tanahashi missed the tour due to an injury. All the events were taped and were uploaded to NJPW World on delay without any commentary. In June 2019, NJPW returned to Australia for their Southern Showdown tour in Melbourne and Sydney, with the Melbourne show broadcast live on Pay Per View through Fite TV.

On 26 January 2018 Progress Wrestling announced an Australian tour for April 2018, which would see them partner up with local promotion.

Various Australian wrestling shows like World Series Wrestling have featured overseas talent not signed to a major North American promotion.

In late 2022, NJPW announced NJPW Tamashii, a series of events that would be held in Australia and New Zealand. The Tamashii brand was officially launched in September, with the first Australian show taking place on 13 November in Sydney.

On 25 August 2024, at All In, All Elite Wrestling (AEW) announced its debut show in Australia, Grand Slam Australia, taking place on 15 February 2025. Originally scheduled for Suncorp Stadium in Brisbane, Queensland, the event was later moved to Brisbane Entertainment Centre. It was broadcast live as a television special on ESPN and taped for later broadcast on TNT and HBO Max. That same night, AEW also taped Global Wars Australia, a co-promoted show with its sister promotion Ring of Honor (ROH), which aired on tape delay via Honor Club on February 17. On 25 August 2025, at Forbidden Door, AEW announced its return to Australia with the second Grand Slam Australia taking place on 14 February 2026 at Qudos Bank Arena in Sydney, New South Wales. The following day, AEW will return to the Brisbane Entertainment Centre with House Rules: Brisbane, a non-televised house show.

=== Events list ===
WWE Raw-branded event	WWE SmackDown-branded event	WWE NXT-branded event

Year	Promotion	Tour	Location(s)	Event type
1985	WWF	WWF Australian Tour	Melbourne, Newcastle, Perth	House shows
1986	WWF	WWF Australian Tour	Melbourne, Sydney, Brisbane, Perth, Adelaide	House shows
2000	WCW	WCW Australian Tour (Nitro & Thunder TV Tapings)	Brisbane, Sydney, Melbourne	Taped events (WWE Network)
2000	i-Generation	Superstars of Wrestling: Rodman Down Under	Sydney	Taped event
2001	WWA	WWA The Inception	Sydney	Pay-per-view event (Main Event)
2002	WWA	WWA The Eruption	Melbourne	Pay-per-view event (Main Event)
2002	WWE	WWE Global Warning Tour: Melbourne	Melbourne	Taped event (WWE Network)
2003	WWE	WWE Raw Ruthless Aggression	Sydney, Melbourne	House shows
2003	WWE	WWE Passport to SmackDown	Perth	House show
2004	WWE	WWE SmackDown Superstars Return of the Deadman Tour	Sydney, Brisbane, Melbourne	House shows
2005	WWE	WWE Raw WrestleMania Revenge Tour	Brisbane, Newcastle, Sydney	House shows
2005	WWE	WWE SmackDown WrestleMania Revenge Tour	Melbourne, Perth, Adelaide	House shows
2005	WWE	WWE Raw Survivor Series Tour	Sydney, Adelaide, Melbourne	House shows
2006	WWE	WWE Smackdown Road to Wrestlemania 22 Tour	Sydney, Brisbane	House shows
2006	WWE	WWE Raw SummerSlam Tour	Melbourne, Newcastle, Sydney, Brisbane	House shows
2007	WWE	WWE Raw Survivor Series Tour	Melbourne, Sydney, Brisbane	House shows
2008	WWE	WWE Smackdown ECW Tour	Melbourne, Sydney, Newcastle, Adelaide, Brisbane	House shows
2009	WWE	WWE Raw Live Tour	Melbourne, Sydney, Perth, Adelaide, Brisbane	House shows
2009	-	Hulkamania: Let The Battle Begin	Melbourne, Sydney, Perth, Brisbane	Taped events (Never Released)
2010	WWE	WWE Smackdown Live 2010	Melbourne, Sydney, Perth, Adelaide, Brisbane	House shows
2011	WWE	WWE World Tour	Melbourne, Sydney, Perth, Adelaide, Brisbane	House shows
2012	WWE	WWE Raw World Tour	Melbourne, Sydney, Brisbane	House shows
2013	WWE	WWE Raw World Tour	Melbourne, Sydney, Perth, Adelaide, Brisbane	House shows
2014	WWE	WWE Live	Melbourne, Sydney, Perth	House shows
2015	WWE	WWE Live	Brisbane, Melbourne, Sydney	House shows
2016	HOH	House of Hardcore 15	Melbourne	Taped event (HOH on Twitch)
2016	WWE	WWE Live: Australia	Melbourne, Adelaide, Sydney	House shows
2016	WWE	WWE NXT Live (NXT TV Taping)	Melbourne	Taped event (WWE Network)
2016	WWE	WWE NXT Live	Perth, Canberra, Newcastle, Gold Coast, Sydney	House shows
2017	HOH	House of Hardcore Australia Tour 2017	Melbourne, Sydney, Perth, Adelaide, Brisbane	Taped events (HOH on Twitch)
2017	WWE	WWE Live: Australia	Melbourne, Sydney, Brisbane	House shows
2018	NJPW	Fallout Down Under Tour	Adelaide, Melbourne, Sydney, Perth	Taped events (NJPW World)
2018	Progress Wrestling	Progress x Australia Tour	Perth, Melbourne, Sydney	Taped events (Demand Progress)
2018	HOH	House of Hardcore Australian Tour 2018	Perth, Melbourne, Sydney, Sunshine Coast	Taped events (HOH on Twitch)
2018	WWE	WWE Super Show-Down	Melbourne	Pay-per-view event (WWE Network)
2019	NJPW	Southern Showdown	Melbourne, Sydney	Pay-per-view event (NJPW World)
2019	WWE	WWE Live: Australia	Melbourne, Sydney, Brisbane	House shows
2022	NJPW	NJPW Tamashii	Sydney	Taped events (NJPW World)
2023	NWA	The World is a Vampire: NWA vs. WAOA		
2023	Impact Wrestling	Impact Down Under Tour	Wagga Wagga	
2023	NJPW	NJPW Tamashii	Sydney	Taped events (NJPW World)
2024	WWE	Elimination Chamber	Perth	Pay-per-view event (WWE Network)
2025	AEW	Grand Slam Australia	Brisbane	Taped event (ESPN, TNT, and HBO Max)
2025	WWE	Crown Jewel	Perth	Pay-per-view event (Netflix)
2026	AEW	Grand Slam Sydney	Sydney	Taped event (ESPN, TNT, and HBO Max)
2026	AEW	AEW House Rules: Brisbane	Brisbane	House show

== Television programming ==
=== History ===
From the late 1990s, both WCW Monday Nitro and WWE Raw were broadcast pay television networks with WCW Monday Nitro on TNT and WWE Raw on Fox Sports.

In September 2002 negotiations between FOX8 and WWE fell through and SmackDown! was cancelled. This situation (that also affected WWE pay per views) continued until August 2003 when SmackDown! returned on Saturday nights. RAW was moved from Fox Sports to FOX8 and was shown on Friday nights. In order to prevent spoiler hunting on the internet, FOX8 moved WWE programming to timeslots closer to their United States air date. Finally it start airing RAW live on 4 February 2014

In February 2005, WWE Heat, WWE Velocity and The WWE Experience were added to Fox8 and set up a large wrestling program on Saturdays and Sundays. Despite Heat, Velocity and Experience all being cancelled in the United States the shows continued to be shown in Australia to fulfill contractual obligations. When SmackDown! was moved to Friday nights in the United States, in Australia it remained on Friday afternoons. ECW on Sci Fi began broadcasting in Australia from 2 September 2006 in the place of WWE Velocity on Saturdays.

TNA Impact! began airing on 5 April 2008 on Fox8. It had been airing on Saturday nights on Fuel TV at 8.30pm AEST from June 2011, but this ceased in November 2014 when Fuel was absorbed by Fox Sports. For the remainder of 2014 and into 2015 it was shown on Main Event free of the usual charges, until 27 June 2015.

Free to air wrestling programming has been scarce on Australian television in recent times. However, with the conversion to Digital Television, several wrestling programs were purchased. In June 2008, WWE After Burn aired on Channel 9 on Sunday afternoon. However, it later aired at 1am on Tuesday mornings. TNA Xplosion began airing on One HD in prime time at 8:30pm on Thursday but by late 2010 it had been replaced in effect by the WWE Experience.

A cut down, one-hour version of WWE Raw and SmackDown Live aired from 2017 until 2020 on Nine Network's 9Go!. From January 2020, Kayo Sports began airing WWE Smackdown, WWE Raw and WWE NXT.

On 6 December, 2022, the exclusive WWE channel began transmission on Foxtel on channel 144. All WWE programming was moved to the new channel. This arrangement ended at the end of 2024 with the move to Netflix.

=== Pay-per-view ===
Pay-per-views in Australia are shown on Main Event, the only provider in Australia. WWE's major pay-per-views Royal Rumble, WrestleMania, King of the Ring, SummerSlam and Survivor Series began to be shown on pay-per-view by the late 1990s. Main Event has been broadcasting pay-per-views for both WWE starting from the late 1990s until the end of 2022 (including the Fanatic Series from October 2006 for a time) and WCW pay-per-views from around the same time until they were bought out in March 2001. WWE premium live events moved to the WWE channel in late 2022, and moved to Netflix from the beginning of 2025.

At the beginning of 2003 WWE pay-per-views were also lost to Main Event in the same deal that cost Australian fans SmackDown. Village Cinemas showed them for a few months until August 2003 when they returned to Main Event, starting with SummerSlam. A special NWA-TNA package replaced it in early 2003 but only lasted a year. NWA-TNA pay-per-views were shown once a month throughout 2003 during a time when they were being presented weekly in the United States.

After just over 3 years, NWA-TNA made its return—now just TNA. Beginning with TNA Sacrifice 2006 on 27 May 2006 on tape delay, this continued for 12 months before events started being broadcast live in May 2007. This ceased after the transmission of Slammiversary on 29 June 2015.

Three World Wrestling All-Stars pay per views also aired live in Australia—WWA The Inception, WWA The Eruption and WWA The Reckoning.
