= NWA Florida Tag Team Championship =

Professional wrestling tag team championship

- A previous version of the championship belt

Details
- Promotion: Championship Wrestling From Florida (1968–1987); Florida Championship Wrestling (1988–1989); Professional Wrestling Federation (1989-1991); NWA Florida (1997–2006); Pro Wrestling Fusion (2009–2011); Championship Wrestling From Florida (2012); NWA Signature Pro Wrestling (2015); NWA Florida Wrestling Alliance (2016–2017)
- Date established: December 10, 1968

Other names
- FCW Tag Team Championship (1988–1989); PWF Tag Team Championship (1989–1997)
Statistics
- First champion: The Medics
- Most reigns: Mike Graham and Steve Keirn (11 times)
- Longest reign: Vince Lewis and James Morrison (745 days)
- Shortest reign: Hiro Matsuda and Tim Woods (15 days)

The NWA Florida Tag Team Championship is a professional wrestling championship that has been contested in various Florida-based professional wrestling promotions. It started out in 1968 as the main tag team title in Championship Wrestling from Florida and lasted until 1990 when it was abandoned. It was picked back up in 1997 by NWA Florida, where it was the primary tag team title until June 2005, when the company shut down. In August 2009, the title was picked up by Florida-based Pro Wrestling Fusion until 2011. NWA Florida Underground transformed its FUW Tag Team championship to the NWA Florida Tag Team championship in 2012

== Title history ==
Key
Symbol	Meaning
No.	The overall championship reign
Reign	The reign number for the specific wrestler listed.
Event	The event in which the championship changed hands
N/A	The specific information is not known
—	Used for vacated reigns in order to not count it as an official reign

=== Championship Wrestling from Florida ===
Key
No.	Overall reign number
Reign	Reign number for the specific champion
Days	Number of days held

No.	Champion	Championship change			Reign statistics		Notes	Ref.
No.	Champion	Date	Event	Location	Reign	Days	Notes	Ref.
1	The Medics (Billy Garrett and Jim Starr)	December 10, 1968	CWF Show	Tampa, Florida	1	42	Defeated José Lothario and Wahoo McDaniel in a tournament final.	
—	Vacated	January 21, 1969	—	—	—	—	Championship held up after the match between Jack Brisco and Nick Kozak and the Medics.	
2	The Medics (Billy Garrett and Jim Starr)	January 28, 1969	CWF Show	Tampa, Florida	2	18	Won a tournament.	
—	Vacated	February 15, 1969	—	—	—	—	Titles held up after match between Bobby and Lee Fields and the Medics.	
3	The Medics (Billy Garrett and Jim Starr)	February 18, 1969	CWF Show	Tampa, Florida	3	70	Won the rematch	
4	Lester Welch and The Gladiator	April 29, 1969	CWF Show	Tampa, Florida	1	28		
5	Hiro Matsuda and Missouri Mauler	May 27, 1969	CWF Show	Tampa, Florida	1	56		
6	Jack Brisco and Ciclón Negro	July 22, 1969	CWF Show	Tampa, Florida	1	14		
7	Hiro Matsuda and Missouri Mauler	August 5, 1969	CWF Show	Tampa, Florida	2	29		
8	Ciclón Negro (2) and Sammy Steamboat	September 3, 1969	CWF Show	Miami, Florida	1	52		
9	Bronko Lubich and Chris Markoff	October 25, 1969	CWF Show	Tampa, Florida	1	73		
10	Ciclón Negro (3) and Jack Brisco	January 6, 1970	CWF Show	Tampa, Florida	2	24		
11	Bronko Lubich and Chris Markoff	January 30, 1970	CWF Show	Tallahassee, Florida	2	43		
12	Missouri Mauler (3) and Dale Lewis	March 14, 1970	CWF Show	Tampa, Florida	1	37		
13	Jose Lothario and Argentina Apollo	April 20, 1970	CWF Show	Orlando, Florida	1	150		
14	The Texas Outlaws (Dick Murdoch and Dusty Rhodes)	September 17, 1970	CWF Show	Jacksonville, Florida	1			
—	Vacated	December 1970	—	—	—	—	The Texas Outlaws were stripped of the title for being disqualified too many times.	
15	Jose Lothario (2) and Danny Miller	December 25, 1970	CWF Show	Tampa, Florida	1	10	Defeated the Infernos in a one night six-tag team tournament.	
16	The Infernos (Frankie Cain and Rocky Smith)	January 4, 1971	CWF Show	Orlando, Florida	1	43		
17	The Brisco Brothers (Jack Brisco(3) and Jerry Brisco)	February 16, 1971	CWF Show	Tampa, Florida	1	42		
18	The Funk Brothers (Dory Funk Jr. and Terry Funk)	March 30, 1971	CWF Show	Tampa, Florida	1	14		
19	The Brisco Brothers (Jack Brisco(4) and Jerry Brisco)	April 13, 1971	CWF Show	Tampa, Florida	2	57		
—	Vacated	June 9, 1971	—	—	—	—	Jerry Brisco was injured and unable to defend the championship.	
20	Ron Garvin and Ole Anderson	July 2, 1971	CWF Show	Jacksonville, Florida	1	34	Won a tournament.	
21	The Australians (Ron Miller and Larry O'Dea)	August 5, 1971	CWF Show	Jacksonville, Florida	1	77		
22	Dick Murdoch (2) and Bobby Duncum	October 21, 1971	CWF Show	Tampa, Florida	1	13		
23	The Australians (Ron Miller and Larry O'Day)	November 3, 1971	CWF Show	Miami, Florida	2	35		
24	The Alaskans (Mike York and Frank Monte)	December 8, 1971	CWF Show	Miami, Florida	1	14		
25	The Australians (Ron Miller and Larry O'Day)	December 22, 1971	CWF Show	Miami, Florida	3	19		
26	The Infernos (Frankie Cain and Rocky Smith)	January 10, 1972	CWF Show	West Palm Beach, Florida	2	36		
27	The Australians (Ron Miller and Larry O'Day)	February 15, 1972	CWF Show	Tampa, Florida	4	23		
28	Bobby Shane and Bearcat Wright	March 9, 1972	CWF Show	Tampa, Florida	1	61		
29	Boris Malenko and Bob Roop	May 9, 1972	CWF Show	Tampa, Florida	1	22		
30	Mike Webster and The Professional (Note: This was Doug Gilbert under a mask.)	May 31, 1972	CWF Show	Miami, Florida	1	24		
31	Boris Malenko (2) and Johnny Walker	June 24, 1972	CWF Show	Jacksonville, Florida	1	5		
32	The Zodiac and Taurus	June 29, 1972	CWF Show	Jacksonville, Florida	1	6		
33	Hiro Matsuda (3) and Tim Woods	July 5, 1972	CWF Show	Miami, Florida	1	15		
34	Nick Bockwinkel and Ray Stevens	July 20, 1972	CWF Show	Tampa, Florida	1	26		
35	Matsuda (4) and Bob Orton (2)	August 15, 1972	CWF Show	Tampa, Florida	1	21	Bob Orton previously held the championship under the name "The Zodiac".	
—	Vacated	September 5, 1972	—	—	—	—	Orton defeated Matsuda to win both tag team belts, but the NWA ruled that the championship was vacant.	
36	Ron Fuller and Jimmy Golden	September 19, 1972	CWF Show	Tampa, Florida	1	21	Defeated Paul Jones and Dick Murdoch in tournament final.	
37	Norvell Austin and Sputnik Monroe	October 10, 1972	CWF Show	Tampa, Florida	1	37		
38	The Brisco Brothers (Jack Brisco(5) and Jerry Brisco)	November 16, 1972	CWF Show	Tampa, Florida	3	41		
39	Bobby Shane (2) and Chris Markoff (3)	December 27, 1972	CWF Show	Miami, Florida	1	21		
40	Tim Woods (2) and Big Bad John	January 17, 1973	CWF Show	Miami, Florida	1	27		
41	Bobby Shane (3) and Gorgeous George Jr.	February 13, 1973	CWF Show	Tampa, Florida	1	7		
42	Mike Graham and Kevin Sullivan	February 20, 1973	CWF Show	Tampa, Florida	1	102		
43	The Samoans (Tio Tio and Reno Tufuuli)	June 2, 1973	CWF Show	St. Petersburg, Florida	1	59		
44	Mike Graham and Kevin Sullivan	July 31, 1973	CWF Show	Tampa, Florida	2	14		
45	The Samoans (Tio Tio and Reno Tufuuli)	August 14, 1973	CWF Show	Tampa, Florida	2	7		
46	Mike Graham and Kevin Sullivan	August 21, 1973	CWF Show	Tampa, Florida	3	46		
47	Dick Slater and Dusty Rhodes (2)	October 6, 1973	CWF Show	St. Petersburg, Florida	1	48		
48	Jos LeDuc and Paul LeDuc	November 23, 1973	CWF Show	Tallahassee, Florida	1	81		
49	Dick Slater (2) and Stan Vachon	February 12, 1974	CWF Show	Tampa, Florida	1	29		
50	Haystacks Calhoun and Kevin Sullivan (4)	March 13, 1974	CWF Show	Miami Beach, Florida	1	6		
51	The Hollywood Blonds (Buddy Roberts and Jerry Brown)	March 19, 1974	CWF Show	Tampa, Florida	1	168		
52	Dick Slater (3) and Mike Graham (4)	September 3, 1974	CWF Show	Tampa, Florida	1	14		
53	Dusty Rhodes (3) and Mike Graham (5)	September 17, 1974	CWF Show	Tampa, Florida	1	14	Graham defeated Slater to win the control of the tag team titles and chose Rhodes as his new partner.	
54	Dick Slater (4) and Toru Tanaka	October 1, 1974	CWF Show	Tampa, Florida	1	88		
55	Dominic DeNucci and Tony Parisi	December 28, 1974	CWF Show	Tampa, Florida	1	0		
56	Dick Slater (5) and J. J. Dillon	February 4, 1975	CWF Show	Florida	1	7		
57	Dick Slater (6) and Johnny Weaver	February 11, 1975	CWF Show	Florida	1	64	Dick Slater defeated J. J. Dillon to win the control of the NWA Florida Tag Team Championship and chose Johnny Weaver as the new tag team partner.	
58	Harley Race and Roger Kirby	April 16, 1975	CWF Show	Miami, Florida	1	59		
59	Roger Kirby (2) and Bob Roop (2)	June 14, 1975	CWF Show	St. Petersburg, Florida	1	25	Bob Roop replaced Harley Race after Race left the area.	
60	Ciclón Negro (4) and Omar Negro	July 9, 1975	CWF Show	Miami Beach, Florida	1	38	Won a tag team battle royal.	
61	J. J. Dillon (2) and Roger Kirby (3)	August 16, 1975	CWF Show	St. Petersburg, Florida	1	32		
62	Ciclón Negro (5) and Omar Negro	September 17, 1975	CWF Show	Miami Beach, Florida	2	89		
63	Roger Kirby (4) and Rip Hawk	December 15, 1975	CWF Show	West Palm Beach, Florida	1	8		
64	Eddie Graham and Mike Graham (6)	December 23, 1975	CWF Show	Tampa, Florida	1	28		
65	Bob Orton Jr. and Bob Roop (3)	January 20, 1976	CWF Show	Tampa, Florida	1	0	Defeated Eddie Graham and Bill Dromo, who was a substitute for Mike Graham	
66	Roger Kirby (4) and Rip Hawk	January 20, 1976	CWF Show	Florida	2	63		
67	The Orton Family (Bob Orton Sr. (3) and Bob Orton Jr. (2))	March 23, 1976	CWF Show	Florida	1	63		
68	Bob Orton Sr. (4) and Bob Roop (4)	May 25, 1976	N/A	N/A	1	14	Bob Roop replaced Bob Orton Jr. after Junior won the NWA Florida Heavyweight Championship	
—	Vacated	June 8, 1976	—	—	—	—	After a match between The Brisco Brothers and Bob Orton and Bob Roop.	
69	Bob Orton Sr. (5) and Bob Roop (5)	June 22, 1976	CWF Show	Tampa, Florida	2	7	Defeated the Brisco Brothers in a rematch.	
70	Bob Backlund and Steve Keirn	June 29, 1976	CWF Show	Tampa, Florida	1	70		
71	The Hollywood Blonds (Buddy Roberts and Jerry Brown)	September 7, 1976	CWF Show	Tampa, Florida	2	55		
72	Mike Graham (7) and Ken Lucas	November 1, 1976	CWF Show	Orlando, Florida	1	43		
73	Bob Orton Jr. (6) and Bob Roop (6)	December 14, 1976	CWF Show	Tampa, Florida	3	27		
74	The Brisco Brothers (Jack Brisco (6) and Jerry Brisco)	January 10, 1977	CWF Show	Orlando, Florida	4	82		
75	Ox Baker and "Superstar" Billy Graham	April 2, 1977	CWF Show	N/A	1	62		
76	The Brisco Brothers (Jack Brisco (7) and Jerry Brisco)	June 3, 1977	CWF Show	Ft. Lauderdale, Florida	5	10		
—	Vacated	June 13, 1977	—	—	—	—	After a match between The Brisco Brothers and Ivan Koloff and Pat Patterson.	
77	Ivan Koloff and Pat Patterson	June 20, 1977	CWF Show	West Palm Beach, Florida	1	91		
78	Rocky Johnson and Pedro Morales	September 19, 1977	CWF Show	West Palm Beach, Florida	1	37		
79	Ivan Koloff (2) and Mr. Saito	October 26, 1977	CWF Show	Florida	1	28		
80	Mike Graham (8) and Steve Keirn (2)	November 23, 1977	CWF Show	Florida	1	3		
—	Vacated	November 26, 1977	—	—	—	—	After a match between Mike Graham and Steve Keirn vs. Ivan Koloff and Mr. Saito.	
81	Ivan Koloff (3) and Mr. Saito	December 6, 1977	CWF Show	Tampa, Florida	2	27	Defeated the Masked Marauders in a tournament final.	
82	Mike Graham (9) and Steve Keirn (3)	January 2, 1978	CWF Show	Florida	2	8		
83	Ivan Koloff (4) and Mr. Saito	January 10, 1978	CWF Show	Tampa, Florida	3	14		
84	The Brisco Brothers (Jack Brisco (8) and Jerry Brisco)	January 24, 1978	CWF Show	Miami, Florida	6	42		
85	Mr. Saito (4) and Mr. Sato	March 7, 1978	CWF Show	Florida	1	98		
86	The Brisco Brothers (Jack Brisco (9) and Jerry Brisco)	June 13, 1978	CWF Show	Miami, Florida	7	14		
87	The Spoilers (Spoiler I and Spoiler II)	June 27, 1978	CWF Show	Tampa, Florida	1	46		
88	Mike Graham (10) and Steve Keirn (4)	August 12, 1978	CWF Show	St. Petersburg, Florida	3	5		
89	The Spoilers (Spoiler I and Spoiler II)	August 17, 1978	CWF Show	Florida	2	19		
90	Mike Graham (11) and Steve Keirn (5)	September 5, 1978	CWF Show	Lakeland, Florida	4	6		
91	Mr. Saito (5) and Mr. Sato	September 11, 1978	CWF Show	Florida	2	12		
92	Mike Graham (12) and Steve Keirn (6)	September 23, 1978	CWF Show	Florida	5	10		
93	Kox and Bobby Duncum (3)	October 3, 1978	CWF Show	Florida	1	11		
94	Pak Song and Eric the Red	October 14, 1978	CWF Show	Lakeland, Florida	1	27		
95	Pak Song (2) and Mr. Uganda (6)	November 10, 1978	N/A	N/A	1	85	Title given to Mr. Uganda, after Eric the Red was involved in a traffic accident.	
96	Mike Graham (13) and Steve Keirn (7)	February 3, 1979	CWF Show	Florida	6	26		
97	Bugsy McGraw and Pak Song (3)	March 1, 1979	CWF Show	Florida	1	25		
98	Mike Graham (14) and Steve Keirn (8)	March 26, 1979	CWF Show	West Palm Beach, Florida	7			
99	Bugsy McGraw (2) and Thor the Viking	May 1979	CWF Show	Florida	1			
100	Jimmy Garvin and Steve Keirn (9)	July 31, 1979	CWF Show	Florida	1	25		
101	Mr. Hito and Mr. Sakurada	August 25, 1979	CWF Show	St. Petersburg, Florida	1	35		
102	Bobo Brazil and Sweet Brown Sugar	September 29, 1979	CWF Show	St. Petersburg, Florida	1	10		
103	Ray Stevens (2) and Mike Graham (15)	October 9, 1979	CWF Show	Tampa, Florida	1	21		
104	Stan Lane and Bryan St. John	October 30, 1979	CWF Show	Tampa, Florida	1	7		
—	Vacated	November 6, 1979	—	—	—	—	After a match between Stan Lane and Bryan St. John vs. Mr. Sakurada and Mr. Hito.	
105	Mike Graham (16) and Steve Keirn (10)	November 13, 1979	CWF Show	Tampa, Florida	8	12	Defeated Mr. Sakurada and Mr. Hito in a tournament final.	
106	Stan Lane and Bryan St. John	November 25, 1979	CWF Show	St. Petersburg, Florida	2	106		
107	Jack Brisco (10) and Jimmy Garvin (2)	March 10, 1980	CWF Show	West Palm Beach, Florida	1	52		
108	Stan Lane and Bryan St. John	May 1, 1980	CWF Show	Jacksonville, Florida	3	52		
109	The Brisco Brothers (Jack Brisco (10) and Jerry Brisco)	June 22, 1980	CWF Show	Orlando, Florida	8	46		
110	Ivan Koloff (5) and Nikolai Volkoff	August 7, 1980	CWF Show	Jacksonville, Florida	1	33		
111	Dusty Rhodes (4) and Bobo Brazil (2)	September 9, 1980	CWF Show	Florida	1	39		
112	Barry Windham and Scott McGhee	October 18, 1980	CWF Show	St. Petersburg, Florida	1	45		
113	The Cowboy Connection (Bobby Jaggers and R.T. Tyler)	December 2, 1980	CWF Show	Tampa, Florida	1	31		
114	Barry Windham (2) and Mike Graham (17)	January 2, 1981	CWF Show	Orlando, Florida	1	10		
—	Vacated	January 12, 1981	—	—	—	—	After Barry Windham won the NWA Florida Heavyweight Championship.	
115	The Cowboy Connection (Bobby Jaggers and R.T. Tyler)	January 16, 1981	CWF Show	Tampa, Florida	2	27	Defeated Manny Fernandez and Mike Graham for the vacant titles.	
116	Dusty Rhodes (5) and André the Giant	February 12, 1981	CWF Show	Ft. Lauderdale, Florida	1	3		
—	Deactivated	February 15, 1981	N/A	N/A	—	—		
117	New Breed (Chris Champion and Sean Royal)	December 25, 1986	CWF Show	Tampa, Florida	1	58	Defeated Kendall Windham and Vic Steamboat to win the championship.	
118	Southern Boys (Steve Armstrong and Tracy Smothers)	February 21, 1987	CWF Show	Sarasota, Florida	1	22		
119	The MOD Squad (Basher and Spike)	March 15, 1987	CWF Show	N/A	1	33		
120	Mike Graham (18) and Steve Keirn (11)	April 17, 1987	CWF Show	N/A	9	67		
121	The Sheepherders (Butch Miller and Luke Williams)	June 23, 1987	CWF Show	Tampa, Florida	1	67		
122	Mike Graham (19) and Steve Keirn (12)	August 29, 1987	CWF Show	St. Petersburg, Florida	10	10		
123	The Mighty Yankees (Bob Cook and Jerry Grey)	September 8, 1987	CWF Show	Tampa, Florida	1	39		
124	Mike Graham (20) and Steve Keirn (13)	October 17, 1987	CWF Show	Lakeland, Florida	11			
—	Vacated	December 1987	—	—	—	—	CWF Closed	

=== Florida Championship Wrestling (Renamed FCW Tag Team Titles) ===
Key
No.	Overall reign number
Reign	Reign number for the specific champion
Days	Number of days held

No.	Champion	Championship change			Reign statistics		Notes	Ref.
No.	Champion	Date	Event	Location	Reign	Days	Notes	Ref.
1	Johnny Ace and The Terminator	September 20, 1988	FCW show	Tampa, Florida	1	107		
2	The Nasty Boys (Brian Knobs and Jerry Sags)	January 5, 1989	FCW Show	Nassau, Bahamas	1	21		
3	Johnny Ace and The Terminator	January 26, 1989	FCW Show	Tampa, Florida	2	57		
4	The Nasty Boys (Brian Knobs and Jerry Sags)	March 24, 1989	FCW Show	St. Petersburg, Florida	2	4	This was a Steel Cage match.	
5	Southern Force (Black Bart and Bobby Jaggers (3))	March 28, 1989	FCW Show	Tampa, Florida	1	42		
6	Mike Graham (21) and Dustin Rhodes	May 9, 1989	FCW Show	Tampa, Florida	1	(Note: The exact date the championship reign ended is uncertain, which means it lasted between 1 and 22 days.)		
7	Southern Force (Black Bart (2) and Tony Anthony)	May 1989	FCW Show	Tampa, Florida	1	(Note: The exact date the championship reign began is uncertain, which means that the reign lasted between 11 and 33 days.)		
8	The Nasty Boys (Brian Knobs and Jerry Sags)	June 11, 1989	FCW Show	Orlando, Florida	3	(Note: The exact date that the championship reign ended is uncertain, which means that the reign lasted between 20 and 50 days.)		
9	The Playboys (Brett Sawyer and Jim Backlund)	July 1989	N/A	N/A	1	(Note: The exact date that the championship reign ended is uncertain, which means that the reign lasted between 22 and 52 days.)	The Playboys were awarded the championship.	
10	The Nasty Boys (Brian Knobs and Jerry Sags)	August 22, 1989	FCW Show	Tampa, Florida	4	56		
11	Jumbo Barretta and Dennis Knight	October 17, 1989	FCW Show	Tampa, Florida	1	26		
12	Mark Starr and Lou Pérez	November 12, 1989	FCW Show	Tampa, Florida	1	4		
13	The Bounty Hunters (Big Al Green and Tim Parker)	November 16, 1989	FCW Show	Tampa, Florida	1	51	Defeated Lou Pérez and Brickhouse Brown to win the championship.	
14	The Nasty Boys (Brian Knobs and Jerry Sags)	January 6, 1990	FCW Show	Nassau, Bahamas	5	96		
15	Robert Fuller and Kendall Windham	April 12, 1990	FCW Show	Tampa, Florida	1	27		
16	Mike Graham (22) and Joe Gomez	May 9, 1990	FCW Show	Tampa, Florida	1	(Note: The exact date the championship reign ended is uncertain, which means that the reign lasted between 84 and 114 days.)		
	vacated	August 1990	N/A	N/A			Mike Graham retired	
17	Mark Starr (2) and Sgt. Rock	September 13, 1990	FCW Show	Tampa, Florida	1	(Note: The exact date that the championship reign ended is uncertain, which means that the reign lasted between 18 and 47 days.)	Defeated Joe Gomez and Hurricane Walker	
18	Hurricane Walker and Tim Parker	October 1990	FCW Show	Florida	1	(Note: The exact date the championship reign began is uncertain, which means that the reign lasted between 13 and 42 days.)		
19	Sgt. Rock and Ron Slinker	November 12, 1990	FCW Show	Florida	1	(Note: The exact date the championship was abandoned is uncertain, which means that the reign lasted between 50 and 80 days.)		
—	Deactivated	January 1991	N/A	N/A	—	—		

=== NWA Florida Major League Wrestling / NWA Florida ===
Key
No.	Overall reign number
Reign	Reign number for the specific champion
Days	Number of days held

No.	Champion	Championship change			Reign statistics		Notes	Ref.
No.	Champion	Date	Event	Location	Reign	Days	Notes	Ref.
1	Blackhearts (Apocalypse and Destruction)	1997	CWF Show	N/A	1	(Note: The length of the championship reign is too uncertain to calculate.)	records are unclear as to whom they defeated	
—	Vacated	1998	—	—	—	—	Championship vacated for undocumented reasons	
2	Steve Keirn (14) and Brian Blair	November 13, 1998	CWF Show	Gainesville, Florida	1	641	Defeated the Cuban Assassin and Pepe Prado to win the championship.	
—	Vacated	August 15, 2000	—	—	—	—	Championship held up after match between Steve Keirn and Brian Blair and The Bushwackers ended in controversial fashion.	
3	Steve Keirn (15) and Brian Blair	September 2000	CWF Show	N/A	2	(Note: The exact date the championship was won is unknown, which means the championship reign lasted between 45 and 74 days.)	Defeated The Bushwackers in a rematch.	
4	Brian Blair (3) and Cyborg	November 14, 2000	CWF Show	Tampa, Florida	1	238	Blair defeated Keirn to win the controls for the tag team titles and choose a new partner.	
—	Vacated	July 10, 2001	—	—	—	—	Vacated when both wrestlers were injured.	
5	The Shane Twins (Mike and Todd Shane)	July 10, 2001	CWF Show	Tampa, Florida	1	151	Won three-way match.	
5	Quickiemart (Yaz and Agent Steele)	December 8, 2001	CWF Show	St. Petersburg, Florida	1	62		
6	Wrongful Death (Naphtali and Dagon Briggs)	February 8, 2002	CWF Show	St. Petersburg, Florida	1	49		
7	Nick Berk and Z-Barr	March 29, 2002	CWF Show	St. Petersburg, Florida	1	1		
8	Wrongful Death (Naphtali and Dagon Briggs)	March 30, 2002	CWF Show	Crystal River, Florida	2	56		
9	The Shane Twins (Mike and Todd Shane)	May 25, 2002	CWF Show	St. Petersburg, Florida	2	139		
10	Scoot Andrews and Mike Sullivan	October 11, 2002	CWF Show	St. Petersburg, Florida	1	120		
11	The Shane Twins (Mike and Todd Shane)	February 8, 2003	CWF Show	St. Petersburg, Florida	3	126		
12	The Vandalz (Tommy Vandal and Ricky Vandal)	June 14, 2003	CWF Show	Pinellas Park, Florida	1	63		
13	The Shane Twins (Mike and Todd Shane)	August 16, 2003	CWF Show	Pinellas Park, Florida	4	196		
14	Fahrenheit 420 (Stash and David Mercury)	February 28, 2004	CWF Show	St. Petersburg, Florida	1	49		
15	Mikey Tenderfoot and Justice	April 17, 2004	CWF Show	Brandon, Florida	1	154		
16	Jerrelle Clark and Mikey Batts	September 18, 2004	CWF Show	Brandon, Florida	1	63		
17	Frankie Capone and Marcus Dillon	November 20, 2004	CWF Show	Brandon, Florida	1	(Note: The exact date NWA Florida closed is uncertain, which means that the championship reign lasted between 193 and 222 days.)		
—	Deactivated	June 2005	—	—	—	—	NWA Florida closed	

=== Pro Wrestling Fusion ===
Key
No.	Overall reign number
Reign	Reign number for the specific champion
Days	Number of days held

No.	Champion	Championship change			Reign statistics		Notes	Ref.
No.	Champion	Date	Event	Location	Reign	Days	Notes	Ref.
1	The Dark City Fight Club (Jon Davis and Kory Chavis)	August 22, 2009	CWF Show	Daytona Beach, Florida	1	224	Defeated Sinn Bodhi and Dagon to win the vacant championship.	
2	The New Heavenly Bodies (Chris Nelson and Vito DeNucci)	April 3, 2010	CWF Show	Tampa, Florida	1	13		
3	The Dark City Fight Club (Jon Davis and Kory Chavis)	April 16, 2010		Sanford, Florida	2	218		
—	Vacated	November 20, 2010	—	—	—	—	The Dark City Fight Club won the NWA World Tag Team Championship	
The FUW Tag Team Titles were renamed the NWA Florida Tag Team Championship
4	Kennedy Kendrick and Deimos	January 25, 2014	NWA FUW Underground Shines 2	Tampa, Florida	1	76	Won a Fatal Four-way match	
5	Generation Genesis (Mitch Mitchell and Jeff Boom)	April 11, 2014	Defeated Kennedy Kendrick in a street fight	St. Petersburg, Florida	1	168		
6	Team Lucha (Jay Rios and Cruz)	September 26, 2014	CWF Show	Tampa, Florida	1	170		
7	Generation Genesis (Mitch Mitchell and Jeff Boom)	March 15, 2015	CWF Show	Plant City, Florida	2	226	Defeated Circle of Disrespect (Francisco Ciatso and Simon Sez.)	
8	Dirty Blondes (Leo Brien and Mike Patrick)	October 27, 2015	CWF Show	Brandon, Florida	1	(Note: The exact date the promotion left the NWA is uncertain, which means that the reign lasted between 5 and 34 days.)}}	Defeated Circle of Disrespect (Francisco Ciatso and Simon Sez.)	
—	Deactivated	November 2015	—	—	—	—	Promotion left the NWA	
