= Mike Graham (wrestler) =

American professional wrestler (1951–2012)

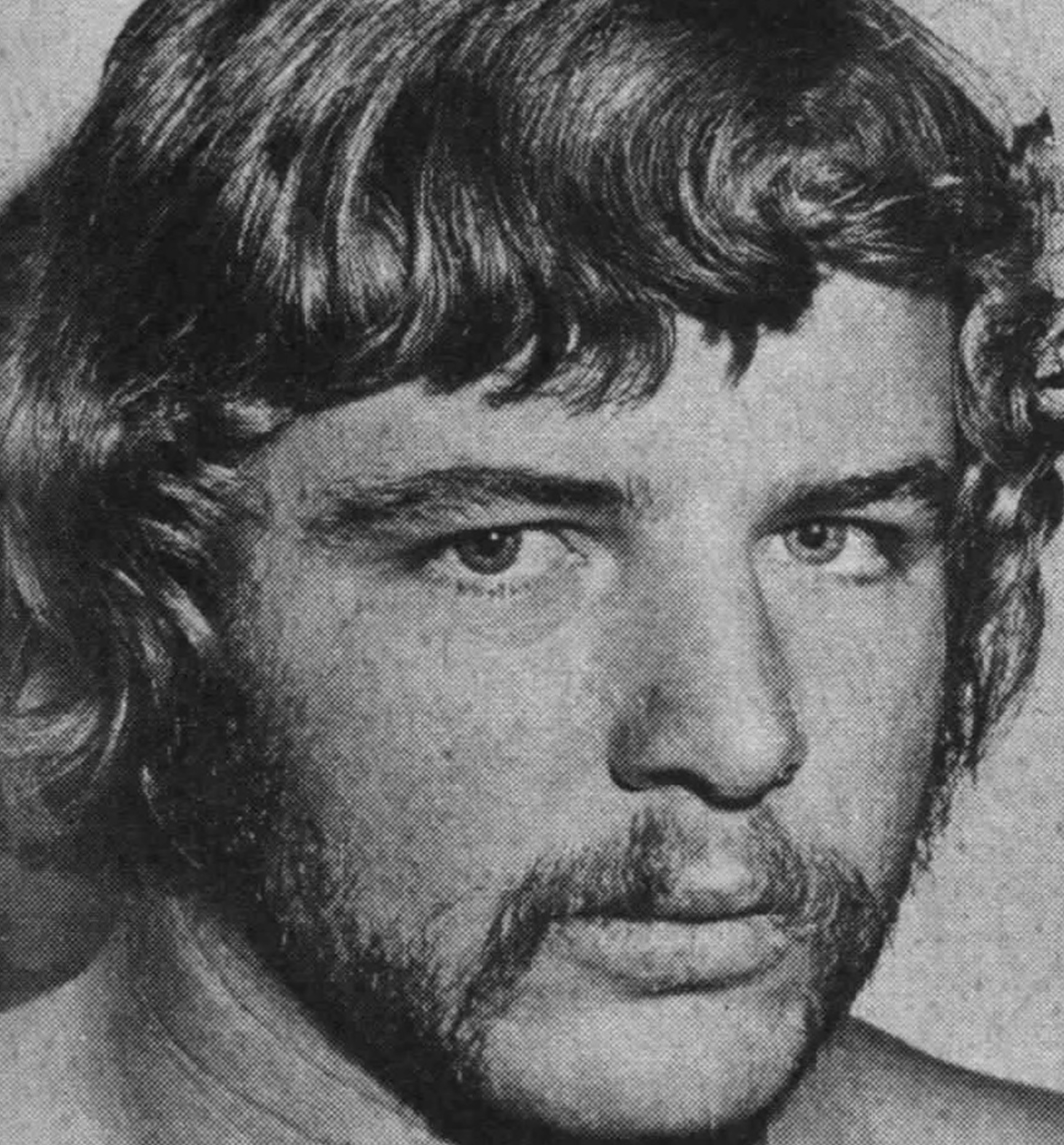
- Graham, circa 1973

Personal information
- Born: Edward Michael Gossett; September 22, 1951 Tampa, Florida, U.S.
- Died: October 19, 2012 (aged 61) Daytona, Florida, U.S.
- Cause of death: Suicide
- Family: Eddie Graham (father)

Professional wrestling career
- Ring name: Mike Graham
- Billed height: 5 ft 8 in (173 cm)
- Billed weight: 230 lb (104 kg)
- Trained by: Eddie Graham; Yasuhiro Kojima; Boris Malenko
- Debut: 1972
- Retired: March 31, 2012

Edward Michael Gossett (September 22, 1951 – October 19, 2012), better known as Mike Graham, was an American professional wrestler who was the son of Eddie Graham.

== Amateur wrestling ==
Mike Graham was a Florida high school wrestling district champion his senior year in 1969 for Thomas Richard Robinson High School in Tampa, Florida. He became a three-time state AAU champion and a Junior Olympics champion at 198 pounds. Graham was a state champion in the 154-pound weight class and, as a sophomore, defeated senior Richard Blood (later to become Ricky Steamboat) in the finals of a district meet. He left the University of Tampa to turn professional against the wishes of his mother Lucy. Mike was also an accomplished powerlifter who set state records in the bench press.

== Professional wrestling career ==
=== Championship Wrestling from Florida (1972 - 1980) ===
Michael Gossett started wrestling in 1972 in his father's Championship Wrestling from Florida, which was a National Wrestling Alliance territory. He was trained by his father, Boris Malenko and Hiro Matsuda. He would often tag team with his father upon his arrival, but also formed a successful tag team with Kevin Sullivan. Sullivan eventually turned on him to form his "Satanic cult", The Army of Darkness. After getting turned on, Graham teamed with the likes of Steve Keirn and Barry Windham to feud with Sullivan's team and to capture several tag team titles over the years. He was a mainstay on the Florida circuit during the ’70s and early 80’s and was a favorite of Gordon Solie and Dory Funk Jr. He was also respected by Ric Flair, who noted "Mike Graham was as tough as they come, a phenomenal performer who never got the recognition he deserved because he was considered too small to be a championship contender. His reputation was legit for his size. He was very tough."

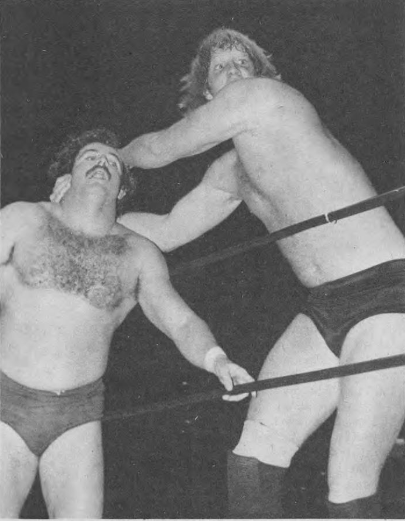
Graham (left) during a 1982 match against David Von Erich

=== American Wrestling Association (1981 - 1982) ===
In 1981, Graham wrestled in the American Wrestling Association and feuded with Buck Zumhofe over the AWA Light Heavyweight Championship over the next two years.

=== Championship Wrestling from Florida (1982 - 1990) ===
Graham headed back to Florida in 1983, where he primarily worked as a tag team wrestler. His father Eddie died after committing multiple gunshot suicide on January 21, 1985, leading to Mike taking over his Championship Wrestling from Florida territory. In the late 1980s, he would again team with Keirn and wrestled in the NWA's Jim Crockett Promotions (who he sold his father's territory to), with Keirn briefly around this time. He then went back to the AWA in 1988, where he won the Light Heavyweight Title again. In the following years, Graham & Keirn wrestled in Memphis as a tag team, and Graham went back to Florida to the newly renamed Florida Championship Wrestling, where he briefly teamed with Dustin Rhodes.

=== World Championship Wrestling (1991 - 1992) ===
Shortly after former FCW booker Dusty Rhodes took over the creative reigns of World Championship Wrestling, Graham was brought into the company and made his debut at a house show in Roanoke, VA on February 8, 1991. Teaming with Rip Rogers, the duo lost to The Young Pistols. Graham gained his first victory on his second match with the company, defeating Bill Maddox in Hampton, VA on April 11. He would go on to compete on numerous house shows, facing both babyface and heel opposition such as Black Bart, The Junkyard Dog and Tom Zenk. Graham made his televised debut on ''WCW Main Event'' on September 8, 1991, defeating Terrance Taylor in the first round of a tournament to crown the first WCW Light Heavyweight Championship. On the Clash of the Champions XVI, Richard Morton defeated Graham in the semi-finals.

On October 12, 1991, Graham teamed withy Brian Pillman to defeat Terrance Taylor & Thomas Rich on WCW Worldwide. Seven days later, he teamed with Big Josh & Bobby Eaton to defeat the entire York Foundation (Rich, Morton, and Taylor) on ''World Championship Wrestling''. On the November 2nd episode of WCW Worldwide, Graham provided guest commentary during a Brian Pillman match; after being goaded by Teddy Long he responded by putting the manager in a figure four. A week later on the same show, Graham would face Long's charge Johnny B. Badd. The feud carried over onto WCW World Championship Wrestling; on November 16th he teamed with WCW World Lightweight Champion Brian Pillman to defeat Johnny B. Badd, Teddy Long, and The Diamond Studd (Scott Hall). On the November 30th episode of Worldwide, he teamed with Brian Pillman & Tom Zenk in a losing effort to the Dangerous Alliance (Arn Anderson, Bobby Eaton, and Larry Zybysko).

As November proceeded, Mike Graham was shown in segments training newcomer Marcus Alexander Bagwell). During the month, Graham would defeat the young wrestler in a dark match on WCW World Championship Wrestling. Meanwhile on the house show circuit, Graham teamed with Big Josh in victorious encounters with The York Foundation. As December began, Graham faced Lightweight Champion Brian Pillman in a series of babyface vs babyface encounters in which the champion emerged victorious. On the December 21st episode of World Championship Wrestling, Graham defeated Thomas Rich. He made his PPV debut on December 29, 1991 at Starrcade 91 in Norfolk, VA, teaming with Dallas Page in an unsuccessful effort against Bill Kazmier & Jushin Liger.

As 1992 proceeded, Graham again teamed with champion Brian Pillman and was defeated by Bobby Eaton & Arn Anderson on the February 1st episode of World Championship Wrestling. In April, he frequently teamed with Greg Valentine as a replacement for an injured Terrance Taylor to defend the United States Tag-Team Championship on the house show circuit. After this, Graham began to be utilized less frequently. In September 1992 he faced rookie Erik Watts on the house show circuit and was featured in a televised segment showing the training of Watts. His final WCW match came on December 27, 1992 at a house show in Hartselle, AL, where he teamed with Bobby Eaton to face Tom Zenk & Johnny Gunn.

=== Post Active Competition ===
Graham retired as an in-ring competitor in 1992. He became a road agent for World Championship Wrestling. Along with the likes of Paul Orndorff, Pez Whatley and DeWayne Bruce, Graham also worked as a trainer in WCW as part of the WCW Power Plant. At Slamboree 1993, Mike represented his deceased father when he was inducted into the WCW Hall of Fame. He was reportedly responsible for causing Chris Benoit, Eddie Guerrero, Dean Malenko, and Perry Saturn to leave the company for the WWF, granting their releases. In the early 2000s, Graham was a road agent for the short-lived Xcitement Wrestling Federation and for Turnbuckle Championship Wrestling. Graham defeated his arch rival Kevin Sullivan at WrestleReunion 3 on September 10, 2005. He made occasional appearances for the revived Florida Championship Wrestling. Mike Graham worked with World Wrestling Entertainment in early 2006, on a DVD about Dusty Rhodes, which was released on June 6, 2006. He made several appearances on WWE 24/7's Legends of Wrestling series as part of a panel which discussed famous pro wrestlers of the 1980s. He also hosted classic episodes of Championship Wrestling from Florida on WWE 24/7 Classics.

Graham's father was posthumously inducted into the WWE Hall of Fame in 2008, with Mike representing him at the ceremony and the following night at WrestleMania XXIV. Graham then competed in a Legends Battle Royal won by Roddy Piper for Pro Wrestling Guerrilla on January 29, 2011. He also held a weekly radio show called Talking Wrestling with Mike Graham. His former tag team partner Kevin Sullivan was the last ever guest in his radio show, recalling a chilling phone call where Mike was emotional and told Kevin he loved him; he killed himself six days later.

== Boat racing career ==
In addition to his wrestling career, Graham also competed in offshore power boat racing. In 1993, Graham throttled Kiely Motorsports' 35' Offshore Class C catamaran to multiple championship finishes:

- 1st Place Finish: Sarasota, Florida
- 1st Place Finish: Marathon, Florida
- 3rd Place Finish: New Orleans, Louisiana
- Reserve Championship: APBA / UIM Offshore World Championship in Sanibel Island, Florida.

Graham maintained position as the throttle man for each finish.

== Death ==
On October 19, 2012, Graham was found dead by his wife of a self-inflicted gunshot wound to the head at their residence in Daytona Beach, Florida during Biketoberfest. He was 61 years old. His father and son had committed suicide in similar manners on January 21, 1985 and December 2010 respectively. At the time of Graham's death, he was wearing his son's old work boots, and also frequently threatened committing suicide to his wife. He was also intoxicated, and according to his toxicology report, his blood-alcohol concentration was at 0.259 percent.

Graham suffered business misfortunes years prior to his death, and a restaurant he owned in Florida closed in 2011 after about two years of operation. He and his wife were also invested in Florida's real estate market, which suffered during the recession. His friends also said that he had struggled with the death of his son Stephen. In the final months in his life, Graham had felt responsible for the deaths of his father and son. A celebration of life for Graham was held in Largo, Florida, where nearly 500 people, including a number of retired professional wrestlers, attended.

== Championships and accomplishments ==
- American Wrestling Association
  - AWA World Light Heavyweight Championship (2 times)
- Championship Wrestling from Florida
  - FCW Tag Team Championship (2 times) - with Dustin Rhodes (1) and Joe Gomez (1)
  - NWA Florida Heavyweight Championship (1 time)
  - NWA Florida Global Tag Team Championship (1 time) - with Scott McGhee
  - NWA Florida Tag Team Championship (16 times) - with Kevin Sullivan (3), Eddie Graham (1), Ken Lucas (1), Steve Keirn (9), Ray Stevens (1), and Barry Windham (1)
  - NWA Florida Television Championship (2 times)
  - NWA International Junior Heavyweight Championship (1 time)
  - NWA North American Tag Team Championship (Florida version) (1 time) – with Steve Keirn
  - NWA United States Tag Team Championship (Florida version) (3 times) - with Steve Keirn
  - PWF Florida Heavyweight Championship (1 time)
- Mid-South Sports
  - NWA Georgia Tag Team Championship (1 time) - with Eddie Graham
- NWA Mid-America
  - NWA World Tag Team Championship (Mid-America version) (1 time) – with Kevin Sullivan
- Pro Wrestling Illustrated
  - Rookie of the Year (1972)
  - PWI ranked him #100 of the 500 best singles wrestler of the year in the PWI 500 in 1992
  - PWI ranked him #325 of the Top 500 Singles Wrestlers of the "PWI Years" in 2003
- Southeastern Championship Wrestling
  - NWA Southeast United States Junior Heavyweight Championship (1 time)
