= Mario Milano =

Italian professional wrestler (1935–2016)

Personal information
- Born: Mario Bulfone; 15 May 1935 Trieste, Trieste, Italy
- Died: 9 December 2016 (aged 81)

Professional wrestling career
- Ring name(s): Barracuda; Black Diablo; Mario Bulfone; Mario Milano; Mario La Pantera
- Billed height: 6 ft 5 in (1.96 m)
- Billed weight: 265 lb (120 kg)
- Debut: 1953
- Retired: 1986

Mario Bulfone (15 May 1935 – 9 December 2016), better known by his ring name Mario Milano, was a professional wrestler. Milano got his start in wrestling in Venezuela and later competed in Australia, Hong Kong, Japan, South Africa, Mexico and North America.

== Professional wrestling career ==
=== Early career ===
Bulfone, though born in Italy, grew up in Venezuela and began wrestling in Caracas at age 18 in 1953. A curfew prohibited anyone under 19 from being out after 9 o'clock, so he had to hide his identity to avoid trouble with the police. He wore a mask and wrestled as Black Diablo. After he turned 20, he wrestled without the mask under his real name.

=== Tennessee ===
In 1962, Bulfone moved to the United States to wrestle, originally under the name Mario La Pantera. A promoter felt that Americans would be unable to remember his name, so he gave Bulfone the name Mario Milano, naming him after Milan, Italy. He lived in Nashville, Tennessee, where he competed for the National Wrestling Alliance (NWA).

With Jackie Fargo, he won his first championship, the Mid-America version of the NWA Southern Tag Team Championship, on 5 November 1963. After holding the title belts for one month, they dropped them to Tojo Yamamoto and Ivan Malenkov but regained them later in December 1963 when Malenkov left the territory and was a no-show at the title defense.

On 2 March 1965, Milano again teamed with Fargo to win the Mid-America version of the NWA World Tag Team Championship. He also teamed with Len Rossi to win the Mid-America version of the NWA Southern Tag Team Championship six times - in total, he won that title nine times.

=== Australia ===
In 1967, Milano was offered a three-month stint wrestling in Australia for promoter Jim Barnett. His stay was then extended, after which he was offered a contract and moved to Australia permanently. Wrestling in the Australian World Championship Wrestling promotion, he teamed with Red Bastien to win the IWA World Tag Team Championship three times that year. He also had two reigns in 1967 as IWA World Heavyweight Champion after defeating Killer Kowalski and Ripper Collins.

He used the Atomic Drop as a finisher, and did an angle where he used it on a 400-pound (180 kg) wrestler.

In 2008 Mario appeared on Australian TV for International Wrestling Australia (IWA) on their series Main Event Wrestling on the Aurora Community Channel. He featured in 6 shows in an angle with resident heel champion Mark Mercedes.

Milano also appears in Roy Slaven's South Coast News series, set in the NSW South Coast town of Ulladulla, as the proprietor of the Bluebird Cafe and the captain/coach of the local A-Grade cricket team.

Milano made a live appearance on Saturday 14 May 2011 for Melbourne-based promotion Professional Championship Wrestling.

=== WWWF ===
In 1970 Milano wrestled for the World Wide Wrestling Federation in the Northeast (New York) territory where he was a babyface. Feuding with Eric the Red and Professor Toru Tanaka. He only stayed with the company for a year.

=== Japan ===
Bulfone wrestled for All Japan Pro Wrestling on tours in 1975 to 1985 after World Championship Wrestling shut down.

== Death ==
Bulfone died on 13 December 2016 at the age of 81.

== Personal life ==
Mario Bulfone was born in Trieste, Italy and later in 1948 moved to Venezuela. He lived in Australia at the time of his death. Bulfone had five children.

== Championships and accomplishments ==
- NWA Mid-America
  - NWA Southern Tag Team Championship (Mid-America version) (9 times) - with Jackie Fargo (2), Len Rossi (6) and Danny Hodge
  - NWA World Tag Team Championship (Mid-America version) (1 time) - with Jackie Fargo
- World Championship Wrestling (Australia)
  - IWA World Heavyweight Championship (4 times)
  - IWA World Tag Team Championship (10 times) - with Red Bastien (3), Billy White Wolf (1), Antonio Pugliese (1), Dominic DeNucci (1), The Spoiler (1), Waldo Von Erich (1), Spiros Arion (1) and Mark Lewin (1)
  - NWA Austra-Asian Heavyweight Championship (1 time)
  - NWA Austra-Asian Tag Team Championship (2 times) - with Bugsy McGraw (1) and Larry O'Dea (1)
  - World Brass Knuckles Championship (4 times)
- International Wrestling Australia
  - IWA Hall of Fame

== In film ==
Mario Milano appeared as the Russian muscleman in Chang Cheh's The Boxer From Shantung in 1972.

- The Boxer From Shantung (1972) - Russian Boxer
- The Spectre of Edgar Allan Poe (1974) - Joseph
- Zebra Force (1976) - Peter
- High Rolling (1977) - Country Fighter
- Beyond Evil (1980) - Dr. Frank Albanos
