= The Great Kabuki =

Japanese professional wrestler (born 1948)

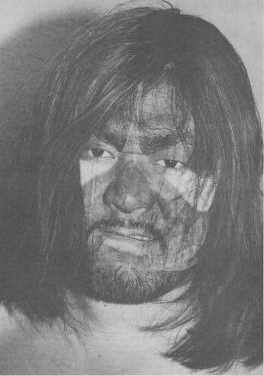
- The Great Kabuki, c. 1980s

Personal information
- Born: September 8, 1948 (age 77) Nobeoka, Miyazaki, Japan
- Children: 4

Professional wrestling career
- Ring name(s): Akihisa Takachiho; Yoshino Sato (II); Devil Sato (II); El Gran Kabuki; The Great Kabuki; Hito Tojo; Kabuki; Mr. Kiyomoto; Mr. Sato; Professor Takachiho; Rising Sun #1; Takachiho
- Billed height: 1.80 m (5 ft 11 in)
- Billed weight: 110 kg (243 lb)
- Billed from: Singapore
- Trained by: Giant Baba; Umanosuke Ueda
- Debut: October 31, 1964
- Retired: September 30, 2018

Akihisa Mera (米良 明久, Mera Akihisa; born September 8, 1948), better known as The Great Kabuki (ザ・グレート・カブキ, Za Gurēto Kabuki), is a Japanese retired professional wrestler. He is famous as the first to blow Asian mist in his opponents' faces.

== Professional wrestling career ==
Mera was born on September 8, 1948, in Nobeoka, Japan. He started wrestling in 1964 at the age of 16 for the Japanese Wrestling Association. He left Japan to compete in the United States in the 1970s. From there he wrestled all over the world, including All Japan Pro Wrestling, several territories of the National Wrestling Alliance including Jim Crockett Promotions, Mid-South, Continental Wrestling Association and World Class Championship Wrestling under the name Akihisa Takachihō. He also used the names Yoshino Sato and Devil Sato (with authorization from his mentor the original Yoshinosato, former sumotori Junzo Hasegawa, who lead JWA during its dying days), which was later shortened to Mr. Sato (not to be confused with Akio Sato, who later used the moniker in other American territories).

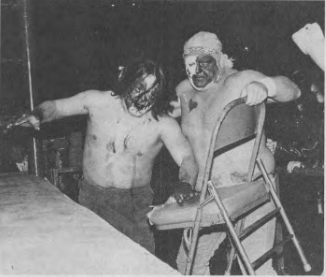
Kabuki (left) and Dusty Rhodes during a professional wrestling match, c. 1982

Mera adopted the Great Kabuki persona in World Class in 1981. The character was created by Gary Hart, based on an old gimmick used by Filipino wrestler Rey Urbano, a former partner of Hasegawa's in the U.S. Kabuki kept his hair in a mop cut which kept his facial features mostly hidden; he also painted his face. Hart explained that his face was scarred in a bed of hot coals during a match with Tiger Jeet Singh in Singapore. He was most often a heel and was managed by most of the top heel managers of the 1970s and early 1980s. When he was a babyface, he was very unpredictable and could turn at any time, making him somewhat of an anti-hero, or tweener. Kabuki had a pre-match ritual of showing his skills with the nunchaku that intimidated most opponents. In WCCW, he joined H & H Limited while managed by Arman Hussein and Gary Hart and tagged with masked wrestler Magic Dragon while building on his singles work. After an injury in 1983, he joined Skandor Akbar's Devastation Inc.

In the early 1980s, the Kabuki character would sometimes be portrayed by wrestler Kazuharu Sonoda, who had been Mera's teammate Magic Dragon in the WCCW. These were mainly appearances for World Class Championship Wrestling, Jim Crockett Promotions, and Georgia Championship Wrestling, as well as appearances in Japan from 1981 to 1984. Sonoda's Kabuki would never appear alongside Gary Hart. Gary Hart did not want Mera or himself to work elsewhere due to their characters' drawing power, but he would allow Sonoda to play the role as deal to promoters who wanted Kabuki for their shows. These appearances continued until Sonoda's death in 1987.

Kabuki was the first wrestler to blow Asian mist into his opponents' faces. When Keiji Mutoh debuted in Jim Crockett Promotions as The Great Muta in March 1989, Mutoh was billed by manager Gary Hart as Kabuki's son due to the similarities in style and the use of Asian mist. In reality, they are not related.

Some of Kabuki's major feuds were against Jimmy Valiant, Scott Casey, Abdullah the Butcher, Dusty Rhodes, Toshiaki Kawada, Chris Adams, Genichiro Tenryu, Bruiser Brody, and the Fabulous Freebirds. Kabuki's battles against Adams were billed as the battle of the superkicks, as ring announcer Bill Mercer often asked which kick was better: Adams' superkick or Kabuki's thrust kick.

In July 1990, Kabuki won the World Tag Team Championship with Jumbo Tsuruta, but within days, he joined Tenryu in creating the Super World of Sports promotion. In 1992, he joined New Japan Pro-Wrestling's Heisei Ishingun, until leaving in 1996. From there he went on to be one of the co-founders of IWA Japan.

In the World Wrestling Federation, Kabuki participated in the 1994 Royal Rumble, from which he was eliminated by Lex Luger. He also helped take out The Undertaker in the previous match of the night.

Kabuki retired in 1998. He had a series of retirement matches. On July 20, he would main event at the Tokyo Korakuen Hall in IWA Japan by teaming up with Kendo Nagasaki to wrestle Keisuke Yamada and Shigeo Okumura; his last bout in the independent circuit. On August 8 he teamed up with The Great Muta to defeat Michiyoshi Ohara and Tatsutoshi Goto for New Japan Pro-Wrestling, one of the major Japanese circuits. (Giant Baba would not let him retire in All Japan Pro Wrestling due to his jump to SWS.) September 7 was the grand finale for Kabuki, as he teamed up with Terry Funk and Doug Gilbert to defeat Freddy Kruger, Leatherface, and Metalface - symbolically his last match involving foreign wrestlers.

Mera appeared in a band's music video "The Emeralds" under his Great Kabuki gimmick.

On January 4, 2015, Kabuki made a special appearance for New Japan Pro-Wrestling, taking part in the New Japan Rumble on the pre-show of Wrestle Kingdom 9. He was quickly disqualified upon entering the ring due to using the Asian Mist. Kabuki returned a year later, taking part in the Wrestle Kingdom 10 pre-show New Japan Rumble, where he was once again disqualified for using the mist.

Wrestled at a Pro Wrestling Noah show on December 22, 2017, teaming with his Heisei Ishingun teammates Shiro Koshinaka and Akitoshi Saito to defeat Go Shiozaki, Yoshinari Ogawa and Masao Inoue.

Kabuki wrestled his final match on September 30, 2018, at 70 at a show that was independently produced by Masakatsu Funaki in Osaka, Japan, teaming with Giant Small Baba, Small Antonio Inoki, and Teruko Kagawa to defeat the team of HIRO Dai Circus Yasuda, Mitsukuni Daiso, Waka Shoyo, and Yamaishi Meijin in an 8-man tag team match.

== Championships and accomplishments ==
- All Japan Pro Wrestling
  - All Asia Tag Team Championship (1 time) – with Tomotsugu Kutsuwada
  - World Tag Team Championship (1 time) – with Jumbo Tsuruta
- Central States Wrestling
  - NWA Central States Tag Team Championship (2 time) – with Pak Song (1) and Killer Karl Kox (1)
- Championship Wrestling from Florida
  - NWA Florida Tag Team Championship (2 times) – with Mr. Saito
  - NWA United States Tag Team Championship (Florida version) (4 times) – with Mr. Saito
- Japan Wrestling Association
  - NWA United National Championship (1 time)
  - 3rd World Tag League (with Seiji Sakaguchi)
- Mid-Atlantic Championship Wrestling
  - NWA Television Championship (1 time)
- Mid-South Wrestling Association
  - Mid-South Louisiana Heavyweight Championship (1 time)
- National Wrestling Federation
  - NWF World Tag Team Championship (1 time) (with Mitsu Arakawa)
- NWA Los Angeles
  - NWA "Beat the Champ" Television Championship (1 time)
- NWA Mid-America
  - NWA Mid-America Heavyweight Championship (1 time)
- Pro Wrestling Illustrated
  - PWI ranked him # 154 of the 500 best singles wrestlers during the "PWI Years" in 2003.
- Professional Wrestling Hall of Fame and Museum
  - Class of 2020
- Tokyo Sports
  - Effort Award (1975)
  - Outstanding Performance Award (1983)
  - Popularity Award (1983)
- World Championship Wrestling (Australia)
  - NWA Austra-Asian Tag Team Championship (1 time) – with Hiro Tojo
- World Class Championship Wrestling
  - NWA American Heavyweight Championship (1 time)
  - NWA Brass Knuckles Championship (Texas version) (2 times)
  - NWA World Tag Team Championship (1 time) – with Chang Chung
  - WCCW Television Championship (1 time)
- Western States Sports
  - NWA Western States Tag Team Championship (2 time) – with Ricky Romero (1) and Mr. Sato (1)
