= Larry O'Dea =

Australian professional wrestler and promoter

Personal information
- Born: Larry Davies; 1944 Canberra, Australia
- Died: 30 June 1997 (aged 53)

Professional wrestling career
- Ring name(s): Larry O'Dea; Larry O'Day
- Trained by: Hal Morgan; Jim Deakin
- Debut: c. 1964
- Retired: 1993

Larry Davies (1944 – 30 June 1997) was an Australian professional wrestler best known as Larry O'Dea. He was one half of the tag team known as "The Australians" with Ron Miller.

Larry made his professional wrestling debut in the 1960s for George Gardiner Promotions in Australia then soon left for New Zealand before joining World Championship Wrestling in 1964. In 1971 Davies started teaming up with Ron Miller as one-half of the tag team "The Australians" touring the United States and in 1973 he went on a tour of Japan with All Japan Pro Wrestling Davies became a co-owner of Australian wrestling company WCW Australia along with Ron Miller in 1974 up until 1978.

In 1980, he went back to New Zealand.

Davies had a match with his son, Jeff O'Day, at World Championship Wrestling's Clash of the Champions XIX as participants in a tag team tournament for the then vacant NWA World Tag Team Championship. They were eliminated in the first round by The Miracle Violence Connection (Steve Williams and Terry Gordy).

In December 1993, he wrestled a tour of India for Indo-Asian Wrestling.

Larry remained involved in the wrestling industry until his death from liver cancer on 30 June 1997.

== Championships and accomplishments ==
- All Star Pro Wrestling

- NWA British Commonwealth Heavyweight Championship (New Zealand version) (2 times)
- NWA Australasian Tag Team Championship (1 time) - with Ripper Collins

- Championship Wrestling from Florida

- NWA Florida Tag Team Championship (4 times) - with Ron Miller

- Gulf Coast Championship Wrestling

- NWA Tennessee Tag Team Championship (1 time) - with Ron Miller

- World Championship Wrestling (Australia)

- NWA Austra-Asian Tag Team Championship (9 times) - with Ron Miller (4), Bobby Hart (2), Ed Wiskoski (1), Rick Martel (1) and Mario Milano (1)
- NWA Austra-Asian Television Championship (1 time)

- NWA Australia
  - Australian Heavyweight Championship (1 time)
