= Joe Malenko =

American professional wrestler

Personal information
- Born: Jody Simon; June 4, 1956 (age 70) Tampa, Florida, U.S.
- Family: Boris Malenko (father); Dean Malenko (brother)

Professional wrestling career
- Ring name(s): Joe Malenko; Joe Solkoff; Karl Gotch Jr.
- Billed height: 5 ft 10 in (178 cm)
- Billed weight: 220 lb (100 kg)
- Trained by: Boris Malenko; Karl Gotch
- Debut: 1977
- Retired: 2017

Jody Simon (born June 4, 1956) is an American retired professional wrestler, better known by his ring name Joe Malenko. He is the son of Boris Malenko and the older brother of Dean Malenko.

== Professional wrestling career ==
=== Early career (1977–1985) ===
Malenko wrestled as Karl Gotch Jr. in Mexico's Universal Wrestling Association in August 1978.

=== Japan (1985–1999) ===
Malenko is most known for his stints wrestling in Japan. Malenko began in the Universal Wrestling Federation (Japan) in May 1985 for 13 days. One of his most well known matches in the UWF was his tag match with Super Tiger where they faced the team of Yoshiaki Fujiwara and Osamu Kido.

Malenko would then team up with his brother, Dean, in All Japan Pro Wrestling to form "The Malenko Brothers". Malenko would tour regularly with All Japan from February 1988 until May 1992. Malenko had two reigns as World Junior Heavyweight Champion. From late 1989 to early 1990, he teamed with Kenta Kobashi against the Can-Am Express (Dan Kroffat and Doug Furnas) for the All Asia Tag Team Championship. Joe's most memorable matches came in his match versus his brother, Dean and when they (the Malenko Brothers) faced The British Bruisers (Johnny Smith and Dynamite Kid) during Giant Baba's 30th Wrestling Anniversary on September 30, 1990. Joe and Dean's only chance for the All Asia Tag Team Championship was against the Can-Am Express on March 4, 1992, in Tokyo, Japan.

Then Malenko worked for Pro Wrestling Fujiwara Gumi from 1993 to 1994 and UWF International in 1995. He also worked for New Japan Pro Wrestling and Battlarts until his last match in Japan in 1999.

=== North America (1992–2000) ===
Malenko made an appearance in World Championship Wrestling (WCW) in 1992, during the Clash of the Champions XIX. He teamed with his brother to take on the team of Nikita Koloff and Ricky Steamboat in the first round of a tournament held for the NWA World Tag Team Titles. "The Malenko Brothers" came up short. Next Joe and Dean travelled to Puerto Rico to take part in the World Wrestling Council's 19th Anniversary show. They were defeated by Steve Doll and Rex King, who at the time held the WWC World Tag Team Championship.

Malenko made his first appearance in Extreme Championship Wrestling on November 18, 1994. He once again teamed up with his brother, Dean, to take on the team of Sabu and the Tazmaniac, but lost. Dean continued to work ECW, but Joe mainly worked for ECW when they toured in Florida. He worked ECW's first run of Florida shows in 1995 against Stevie Richards and Osamu Nishimura, wrestling to a draw against both. When ECW returned to Florida in May, Malenko was once again featured on the opening matches of the card. On May 5, 1995. Malenko defeated local Florida indy wrestler, and acquaintance from his father's wrestling school, Soulman Alex G. The next night in Tampa, Malenko defeated Miguel San Juan.

On the May 11, 1998 edition of WCW Monday Nitro, Joe Malenko came out and confronted Chris Jericho, who had been in a feud with Dean for weeks. However, the confrontation led to an attack by Jericho in Joe Malenko's only appearance on Nitro.

He wrestled his last match on September 19, 2000, against Greg Valentine in a no-contest in Tampa, Florida.

=== Later career (2010, 2012, 2017) and retirement ===
On October 25, 2010, it was announced that Malenko would be participating in All Japan Pro Wrestling's World's Strongest Tag Determination League in November and December 2010 with partner Osamu Nishimura. The duo won twice and drew once in their eight matches in the tournament, finishing eighth out of nine in the final standings.

Simon retired from professional wrestling on December 7, 2010.

On June 24, 2012, Malenko came out of retirement and defeated Kennedy Kendrick in Riverview, Florida.

His last match was on September 26, 2017, in a tag team match with Bob Cook defeating Taino and The Puerto Rican Hound Dog.

== Personal life ==
Simon is Jewish.

He works as a pharmacist in Tampa, Florida.

== Championships and accomplishments ==
- All Japan Pro Wrestling
  - World Junior Heavyweight Championship (2 times)
- Florida Mixed Martial Arts Hall of Fame
  - Class of 2025
- Global Wrestling Alliance
  - GWA Tag Team Championship - with Dean Malenko
- Cauliflower Alley Club
  - Men's Wrestling Award (2023)
- Pro Wrestling Illustrated
  - PWI ranked him #101 of the 500 best singles wrestlers in the PWI 500 in 1993
  - PWI ranked him #276 of the Top 500 best singles wrestlers in the PWI Years in 2003

== See also ==
- List of Jewish professional wrestlers
