= Ricky Hunter =

Canadian professional wrestler (1936–2022)

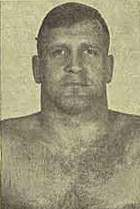
- Sprott in 1973

Personal information
- Born: Charles B. Sprott; March 1, 1936 Winnipeg, Manitoba, Canada
- Died: February 8, 2022 (aged 85)

Professional wrestling career
- Ring name(s): Buddy Sprott; Rocky Hunter; Ricky Hunter; The Gladiator; The Spartan; The Super Gladiator; Cowboy Rick Hunter; Rick Hunter
- Billed height: 5 ft 10 in (178 cm)
- Billed weight: 237 lb (108 kg)
- Billed from: Portland, Oregon
- Trained by: George Gordienko; Ole Olsen
- Debut: October 16, 1957
- Retired: 1990

Charles B. Sprott (March 1, 1936 – February 8, 2022) was a Canadian professional wrestler, better known by his ring names Ricky Hunter and the masked wrestler The Gladiator. He was best known for his title-winning success in Championship Wrestling from Florida in the late 1960s, and for his stint from the mid-1980s in the World Wrestling Federation (now WWE).

Sprott was active for over 30 years, mainly performing in a number of National Wrestling Alliance (NWA) promotions. He wrestled throughout the United States and Canada, and internationally, including in Australia, Japan, and England.

== Professional wrestling career ==
=== Early career (1957–1962) ===
Sprott made his debut on October 16, 1957 in his hometown of Winnipeg, Manitoba, Canada, wrestling under a variation of his real name, Buddy Sprott. He won his first championship, the Atlas Wrestling Club junior heavyweight title, by defeating Ray Lasko in September 1958 in Lockport, Manitoba. In September 1961 he teamed with George Eakin to defeat John DePaulo and Stan Mykietowich to win the Madison Wrestling Club tag team titles in Winnipeg, losing them two months later to Bob Brown and John DePaulo.

=== United States (1962–1968) ===
In early 1962 Sprott expanded from his base in Manitoba, entering the larger wrestling market in the United States. He went to train with Verne Gagne of the American Wrestling Association in Minneapolis, Minnesota, and Don Owen of the Pacific Northwest Wrestling promotion in Portland, Oregon. He then wrestled with Ed Francis' promotion in Hawaii and Worldwide Wrestling Associates in Los Angeles run by Mike and Gene LeBell under the name Rocky Hunter, in the Pacific Northwest as Ricky Hunter, as well as still appearing in Manitoba as Buddy Sprott. During this time he faced notable opponents such as Mad Dog Vachon, Pat Patterson, and Mr. Fuji. Sprott continued to develop his in-ring ability and success rate, wrestling mainly in Hawaii and the American and Canadian Pacific Northwest through to 1966, but including at least one international tour, wrestling in Australia in 1963.

In March 1966 Sprott began wrestling in Roy Shire's NWA San Francisco territory, where he would remain for most of that year. Sprott credited his time in California with Shire as the point where they developed his masked wrestling character The Gladiator. In early 1967 Sprott moved onto Central States Wrestling where he would compete with the likes of Lou Thesz and Bob Orton, and later that year he entered Georgia Championship Wrestling. At the start of 1968 he undertook an extensive tour of Japan, wrestling with the Japan Wrestling Association, and then returned via Hawaii to again wrestle in Georgia.

=== Championship Wrestling from Florida (1968–1969) ===
At the start of November 1968 Sprott moved to the Championship Wrestling from Florida promotion, where he started performing as his masked persona of The Gladiator. He became one of the first wrestlers to employ the inverted suplex manoeuvre, and it was in this promotion that he had his greatest success, winning multiple titles over the next year.

On 23 November 1968 The Gladiator defeated Nick Kozak in Tampa to win the NWA Florida Heavyweight Championship for the first time. The Gladiator dropped the belt to Hans Mortier two-and-half months later, on 4 February 1969.

Following this, on 3 April 1969 in Jacksonville The Gladiator defeated Boris Malenko for the NWA Florida Brass Knuckles Championship, which he lost back to Malenko two weeks later on 17 April. On 23 April The Gladiator fought the reigning NWA World Heavyweight Champion and future Hall of Famer Dory Funk, Jr. to a sixty-minute time-limit draw, with a rematch on 21 May going for ninety minutes before The Gladiator lost by disqualification.

The Gladiator teamed with Lester Welch to defeat the team of The Medics (Billy Garrett and Jim Starr) for the NWA Florida Tag Team Championship on 29 April in Tampa, becoming only the second team to hold this title. The Gladiator and Welch lost these belts to the team of Yasuhiro Kojima and The Missouri Mauler on 27 May. The Gladiator then regained the NWA Florida Heavyweight Championship by defeating Mortier on 13 June 1969 to become a two time heavyweight champion, but shortly after again lost the belt back to Mortier.

=== Around the territories (1969–1985) ===
==== Hawaii, Texas and the Pacific Coast (1969-1973) ====
Following his successful run in Florida, Sprott again moved around the wrestling territories of the time. Throughout the remainder of 1969 and 1970 he returned to Hawaii as Ricky Hunter, and fought through Shire's San Francisco territory as The Gladiator. In early 1971 he again toured Japan as Ricky Hunter, and then spent several months in the NWA Western States promotion, based in Amarillo, Texas, famous as the home territory of the Funks. Wrestling as The Spartan, on 14 April 1971 he defeated Pak Song to win the NWA Western States Heavyweight Championship, losing the belt to Terry Funk in May.

He returned to Hawaii and California territories through 1972, wrestling again as Ricky Hunter. In April 1972 he returned to the Pacific Northwest, where he remained for the rest of the year. In 1973 he moved onto World Class Championship Wrestling based in Texas.

==== All-South Wrestling Alliance (1973-1974) ====
In mid-1973, adopting the new moniker of The Super Gladiator, he entered the recently created independent All-South Wrestling Alliance (ASWA) based in Atlanta, a non-National Wrestling Alliance (NWA) competitor to Georgia Championship Wrestling. On 31 July 1973 in Atlanta The Super Gladiator teamed with Tommy Seigler to beat Rock Hunter and Assassin #2 to win the ASWA Georgia Tag Team Championship, which they would hold until 9 October before losing it back to the same opponents.

On Friday, 24 August 1973 The Atlanta Constitution & Journal reported that Sprott had sued the reigning NWA World Heavyweight Champion Jack Brisco for slander and harassment, seeking a $75,000 payment plus losses. The lawsuit arose from an alleged incident in the parking lot of WTCG-TV the previous month, where Sprott claimed Brisco had called him names "in hearing distance of a number of wrestling fans" waiting for a wrestling television taping. The result of the case is not known, but the alleged incident would have occurred at the height of tensions between the NWA's Georgia Championship Wrestling and Sprott's rebel independent All-South Wrestling Alliance.

Just over two weeks after losing the tag team titles he shared with Tommy Seigler, on 27 October 1973 The Super Gladiator defeated Seigler to win the ASWA Georgia Television Title. He would never relinquish this title, retaining it in his last recorded title defence against El Mongol in March 1974. Although briefly successful and attracting several high-profile wrestlers, the ASWA was squeezed out of business by the powerful NWA, with The Super Gladiator being the last recorded television champion when the promotion closed in November 1974.

==== California, AWA and the Northwest (1974-1985) ====
In mid-1974 Sprott went back to wrestling in California as Ricky Hunter. In April 1975 he again returned to wrestle in the NWA Pacific Northwest promotion and the Canadian Northwest Wrestling promotion's NWA: All-Star Wrestling based in British Columbia. On 16 June 1975 he teamed with Guy Mitchell to defeat Gene Kiniski and Dale Lewis for the NWA Canadian Tag Team Championship in Vancouver. This was Sprott's first and only title as the maskless Ricky Hunter, and the last championship title he would hold; they dropped these belts to Lewis and Mr. Saito on 10 August 1975.

Sprott remained wrestling chiefly in California and the Northwest until mid- to late 1979. He then spent several months in the American Wrestling Association (AWA) in Minneapolis, and from mid-1980 divided his time between the AWA and the NWA Pacific Northwest, as well as spending some time overseas, including in England. Sprott said after retiring that the Portland territory was by far his favourite, and he also enjoyed wrestling in the San Francisco territory, thus explaining the extended time he spent in these areas.

Throughout this period Sprott shared the ring with many of the biggest names in wrestling, as both opponents and tag team partners. This included both past and future World Champions, and future Hall of Famers, including the likes of André the Giant, Jesse The Body Ventura, Rowdy Roddy Piper, Superfly Jimmy Snuka, Superstar Billy Graham, and Soulman Rocky Johnson.

=== World Wrestling Federation (1985–1996) ===
==== As a wrestler (1985-1990) ====
Approaching fifty years of age, and beyond his prime, Sprott joined the World Wrestling Federation (WWF) (now WWE) in mid-1985, shortly after the first WrestleMania event. In the WWF he performed as both Rick Hunter and The Gladiator, with both characters taking on the role of a jobber, cleanly losing to the stars of the day. Both Rick Hunter and The Gladiator made regular appearances on WWF Championship Wrestling and the later WWF Superstars of Wrestling, the WWF's nationally and internationally broadcast weekly television programs of the time.

Despite the sustained record of losses at this time, Sprott's personas, particularly Rick Hunter, put up many creditable performances, and he was sometimes teamed with bigger name characters to take the pinfall in tag team matches. By performing as both a masked and an unmasked wrestler, Sprott was often used as a heel or 'bad guy', losing to the big-name face or 'good guy' characters, while his other persona could be a face, losing to the big-name heels. This, along with his ability to put on credible matches, made Sprott a very useful jobber for the bookers as he was able to take on a multitude of roles. Sprott stated that at times he would wrestle two matches in a night, one as each of his characters. Sprott's last recorded match with the WWF was on December 11, 1990 in Tampa, Florida, where he teamed with Dennis Allen losing to The Bushwhackers on WWF Superstars of Wrestling.

==== Refereeing (1990-1996) ====
Despite this, Sprott stayed in the business, wrestling occasionally as a fill-in for absent or injured wrestlers in house shows or dark matches, as well as assisting with setting up the ring. With his decades of experience, during his last five years with the WWF Sprott also took on the role of referee. Sprott finally left the sport around 1996, stating in a 2006 interview that "... for thirty-six years I was a professional wrestler and loved every minute of it".

== Personal life ==
Hunter was reported to have been a firefighter with the Winnipeg Fire Department from the mid-1950s to the early 1960s, when he quit to take up wrestling full-time. Sprott retired to Clearwater, Florida, and was married to Sharon, however he was a widower.

He died on February 8, 2022, at the age of 85.

== Championships and accomplishments ==
- Atlas Wrestling Club
  - Junior Heavyweight Champion (1 time) (as Buddy Sprott)
- Madison Wrestling Club
  - Tag Team Championship (1 time) – with George Eakin (as Buddy Sprott)
- L&G Promotions
  - L&G Caribbean Heavyweight Championship (1 time)
- Championship Wrestling from Florida
  - NWA Florida Heavyweight Championship (2 times) (as The Gladiator)
  - NWA Florida Brass Knuckles Championship (1 time) (as The Gladiator)
  - NWA Florida Tag Team Championship (1 time) – with Lester Welch (as The Gladiator)
- All-South Wrestling Alliance
  - Georgia Tag Team Championship (1 time) – with Tommy Seigler (as The Super Gladiator)
  - Georgia Television Championship (1 time, undefeated) (as The Super Gladiator)
- NWA All-Star Wrestling
  - NWA Canadian Tag Team Championship (Vancouver version) (1 time) – with Guy Mitchell (as Ricky Hunter)
- Western States Sports
  - NWA Western States Heavyweight Championship (2 times) (as The Spartan)
  - NWA Western States Tag Team Championship (3 times) - with Mr. Wrestling
