= Sonny King (wrestler) =

American professional wrestler (1945–2024)

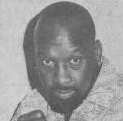
- King in 1978

Personal information
- Born: Larry Johnson; February 8, 1945 North Carolina, U.S.
- Died: August 31, 2024 (aged 79)

Professional wrestling career
- Ring name: Sonny King
- Billed height: 6 ft 1 in (185 cm)
- Billed weight: 231 lb (105 kg)
- Debut: 1960s
- Retired: 1985

Larry Johnson (February 8, 1945 – August 31, 2024) was an American professional wrestler better known as Sonny King. He competed in the World Wide Wrestling Federation (WWWF), where he won the WWWF Tag Team Championship. Professional wrestling journalist and historian Dave Meltzer credits King as one of the first African-American wrestlers ever to hold a championship in WWWF, which would later become WWE.

== Professional wrestling career ==
Johnson began his career as a professional boxer, but later turned to professional wrestling after befriending Ernie Ladd. Johnson initially turned down the offer from Jack Britton to join the business, but later tried it anyway. He began his training in Detroit. He later worked in Pittsburgh and Ontario.

In 1972, he teamed with Chief Jay Strongbow to win the World Wide Wrestling Federation's World Tag Team Championship from Baron Mikel Scicluna and King Curtis Iaukea. After a month, they lost the title to the team of Professor Tanaka and Mr. Fuji. Through 1973 and 1974, he worked in NWA Mid Atlantic where he most often fought Johnny Valentine and Swede Hanson.

Johnson won the NWA Alabama Heavyweight Championship in Alabama in March 1977. In 1978 and 1979, Johnson worked in Memphis as a manager to Jos Leduc and Ron Bass. He also feuded with Jerry Lawler for the Southern Championship. While with Championship Wrestling from Florida, he traded the Florida version of the NWA Brass Knuckles Championship with Killer Karl Kox.

While partnering with The Angel in the Continental Wrestling Association in 1980, he won the AWA Southern Tag Team Championship. While waiting for a card to start in the Carolinas, he noticed a male force his way into an arena past an elderly security guard. When Johnson confronted the man, he was stabbed numerous times, during which he suffered a punctured lung and the knife nicked his heart. Johnson was rushed into emergency surgery. Years later, Johnson recounted the surgeon having to massage his heart outside his body to keep him alive. He retired in the mid-1980s.

== Personal life and death ==
Johnson was born on 8 February 1945. He grew up in North Carolina. After retiring from wrestling, he worked in a junkyard in South Florida, buying and selling car parts. One of his sons played football for the South Carolina Gamecocks. He was reunited with another son after a 2010 interview. Johnson died on August 31, 2024, at the age of 79.

== Championships and accomplishments ==
- Championship Wrestling from Florida

- NWA Brass Knuckles Championship (Florida version) (1 time)

- Continental Wrestling Association

- AWA Southern Tag Team Championship (2 times) - with Ricky Morton (1) and The Angel (1)

- Southeastern Championship Wrestling

- NWA Alabama Heavyweight Championship (1 time)
- NWA Gulf Coast Tag Team Championship (1 time) - with Eddie Sullivan

- International Wrestling Association

- IWA Brass Knuckles Championship (1 time)

- World Wide Wrestling Federation

- WWWF World Tag Team Championship (1 time) - with Chief Jay Strongbow
