= NWA Brass Knuckles Championship (Florida version) =

Professional wrestling championship

Details
- Promotion: Championship Wrestling from Florida
- Date established: January, 1960
- Date retired: 1984

Other name(s)
- NWA World Brass Knuckles Championship (Florida version)
Statistics
- First champion(s): Danny McShain
- Most reigns: Boris Malenko (8 reigns)
- Longest reign: Bobby Duncum (166 days) (Note: There are several reigns where the start or end date is unclear, which means there could be a reign that lasted longer than 166 days but an exact length has not been verified.)
- Shortest reign: Jack Brisco (0 days)
- Oldest champion: Tarzan Tyler (45 years)
- Youngest champion: Dusty Rhodes (25 years, 60 days)

The Florida version of the NWA Brass Knuckles Championship was a secondary professional wrestling championship defended sporadically in the National Wrestling Alliance's Florida territory, Championship Wrestling from Florida. As its name suggests, the title was contested in matches in which the participants wore brass knuckles and it existed from 1960 until the title was abandoned, no earlier than late 1984.

== Title history ==
Key
No.	Overall reign number
Reign	Reign number for the specific champion
Days	Number of days held

No.	Champion	Championship change			Reign statistics		Notes	Ref.
No.	Champion	Date	Event	Location	Reign	Days	Notes	Ref.
1	Danny McShain	January 11, 1960 (nlt)	CWF show	N/A	1	(Note: The length of the reign is too uncertain to calculate.)	Newspaper reports indicate that McShain had been awarded the championship "recently".	
2	Jan Madrid	February 22, 1960	CWF show	Orlando, Florida	1	7		
3	Eddie Graham	February 29, 1960	CWF show	Orlando, Florida	1	50		
4	Mike DiBiase	April 19, 1960	CWF show	Tampa, Florida	1	7		
5	Eddie Graham	April 26, 1960	CWF show	Tampa, Florida	2		Listed as champion on May 20, 1963. Later inactive	
Championship history is unrecorded from 1963 to April 23, 1968.
6	Johnny Valentine	April 23, 1968	CWF show	Tampa, Florida	1	48	Championship was reactivated as the Florida version. Unclear if Valentine was the first holder of the reactivated championship	
7	Eddie Graham	June 10, 1968	CWF show	Orlando, Florida	3	24		
8	Boris Malenko	July 4, 1968	CWF show	Jacksonville, Florida	1	26		
9	Joe Scarpa	July 30, 1968	CWF show	Tampa, Florida	1	23		
10	Boris Malenko	August 22, 1968	CWF show	Jacksonville, Florida	2	74		
11	José Lothario	November 4, 1968	CWF show	Orlando, Florida	1	14		
12	Boris Malenko	November 18, 1968	CWF show	Orlando, Florida	3	136		
13	The Gladiator	April 3, 1969	CWF show	Jacksonville, Florida	1	14		
14	Boris Malenko	April 17, 1969	CWF show	Jacksonville, Florida	4	6		
15	Joe Scarpa	April 23, 1969	CWF show	Miami Beach, Florida	2	67		
16	Boris Malenko	June 29, 1969	CWF show	Miami Beach, Florida	5	66		
17	Beautiful Brutus	September 3, 1969	CWF show	Miami Beach, Florida	1	62		
18	Dale Lewis	November 4, 1969	CWF show	Miami Beach, Florida	1	16		
19	Don Curtis	November 20, 1969	CWF show	Jacksonville, Florida	1	21		
20	The Missouri Mauler	December 11, 1969	CWF show	Jacksonville, Florida	1	26		
21	Danny Miller	January 6, 1970	CWF show	Tampa, Florida	1	42		
22	The Missouri Mauler	February 17, 1970	CWF show	Tampa, Florida	2	74		
23	José Lothario	May 2, 1970	CWF show	San Juan, Puerto Rico	2	24		
24	Thunderbolt Patterson	May 26, 1970	CWF show	Tampa, Florida	1	88		
25	José Lothario	August 22, 1970	CWF show	San Juan, Puerto Rico	3	101		
26	Dusty Rhodes	December 1, 1970	CWF show	Tampa, Florida	1			
—	Vacated	December 1970	—	—	—	—	Dusty Rhodes was stripped of the title for undocumented reasons	
27	Tarzan Tyler	December 22, 1970	CWF show	Tampa, Florida	1	39		
28	Ciclón Negro	January 30, 1971	CWF show	Miami Beach, Florida	1	24		
29	Boris Malenko	February 23, 1971	CWF show	Tampa, Florida	6	57		
30	The Champion	April 21, 1971	CWF show	Miami Beach, Florida	2	14		
31	Dale Lewis	May 5, 1971	CWF show	Miami Beach, Florida	2	38		
32	Bob Roop	June 12, 1971	CWF show	Jacksonville, Florida	1	19		
33	Bobby Duncum	July 1, 1971	CWF show	Jacksonville, Florida	1	166		
34	George Gaiser	December 14, 1971	CWF show	Tampa, Florida	1	7		
35	Bobby Duncum	December 21, 1971	CWF show	Tampa, Florida	2	37		
36	Boris Malenko	January 27, 1972	CWF show	Tampa, Florida	7	61		
37	Bearcat Wright	March 28, 1972	CWF show	Tampa, Florida	1	48		
38	Boris Malenko	May 15, 1972	CWF show	Tampa, Florida	8	22		
39	Paul Jones	June 6, 1972	CWF show	Tampa, Florida	1	7		
40	Jack Brisco	June 13, 1972	CWF show	Tampa, Florida	1	0		
—	Vacated	June 13, 1972	—	—	—	—	The championship was vacated for undocumented reasons	
Championship history is unrecorded from June 13, 1972 to December 1972.
41	Dusty Rhodes	December 1972 (nlt)	CWF show	N/A	2			
—	Vacated	December 1972	—	—	—	—	Dusty Rhodes was stripped of the title for striking NWA President Sam Muchnick.	
42	Tarzan Tyler	December 22, 1972	CWF show	Tampa, Florida	3		Won a tournament to become champion	
Championship history is unrecorded from December 22, 1972 to 1975.
43	Killer Karl Kox	1975	CWF show	N/A	1		Won a tournament to become champion.	
44	Rocky Johnson	1976	CWF show	N/A	1			
		N/A	N/A	N/A				
45	Steve Keirn	October 2, 1978	CWF show	West Palm Beach, Florida	1		Defeated Killer Karl Kox to win the championship, records are unclear of in Kox was the champion at the time	
		N/A	N/A	N/A				
46	Killer Karl Kox	1978	CWF show	N/A	2			
47	Sonny King	February 1979 (nlt)	CWF show	N/A	2	(Note: The exact date the championship was won and lost is uncertain, which means that the championship reign lasted at least 62 days.)		
48	Killer Karl Kox	May 1979 (nlt)	CWF show	N/A	3			
		N/A	N/A	N/A				
49	Dick Slater	October 1980 (nlt)	CWF show	N/A	1			
—		N/A	—	—				
50	Jerry Lawler	September 29, 1981 (nlt)	CWF show	St. Petersburg, Florida	1		EIther defended the championship against Bobby Jaggers on that date or won it from Jaggers.	
—		May 1982 (nlt)	—	—	September 29, 1981 (nlt)			
51	Ciclón Negro	May 1982 (nlt)	CWF show	N/A	2			
—		September 1983	—	—	May 1982			
—	Vacated	September 1983 (nlt)	—	—	—	—	Championship vacated for undocumented reasons.	
52	Blackjack Mulligan	September 1983 (nlt)	CWF show	N/A	1		Defeated Kareem Muhammad in a tournament final to become champion	
53	Black Bart	January 1984	CWF show	N/A	1	(Note: The exact date the championship was won is uncertain, which means that the reign lasted between 95 and 125 days.)		
54	Blackjack Mulligan	May 5, 1984	CWF show	St. Petersburg, Florida	2			
55	Panama Gang	November 1984 (nlt)	CWF show	St. Petersburg, Florida	1			
	deactivated	N/A	N/A	N/A			Championship abandoned.	

== See also ==
- List of National Wrestling Alliance championships
