= Jerry Grey (professional wrestler) =

American professional wrestler (1963–2026

Personal information
- Born: Jerry Grey; July 9, 1963 Akron, Ohio, U.S.
- Died: May 25, 2026 (aged 62)

Professional wrestling career
- Ring name(s): Jerry Grey; Mega Maharishi; Mighty Yankee #1
- Billed height: 6 ft 0 in (1.83 m)
- Billed weight: 251 lb (114 kg)
- Debut: September 14, 1981
- Retired: 2009

Jerry Grey (July 9, 1963 – May 25, 2026) was an American professional wrestler.

== Biography ==
Grey made his debut in 1981, and made frequent appearances for Mid South Wrestling, Championship Wrestling from Florida, and Jim Crockett Promotions. He notably had successful matches against Ric Flair and Brickhouse Brown.

He also appeared at Memphis Wrestling, being an advisor to Bill Dundee and Dutch Mantel, under the name Mega Maharishi.

In 1987, alongside his partner Bob Cook, they won the Florida Tag-Team Titles as The Mighty Yankees.

Grey died of colon cancer on May 25, 2026, at the age of 62.

== Championships and accomplishments ==
- Championship Wrestling from Florida
  - NWA Bahamas Heavyweight Championship (1 time)
  - NWA Florida Tag Team Championship (1 time, with Bob Cook)
- Pacific Northwest Wrestling
  - NWA Pacific Northwest Tag Team Championship (1 time, with Tom Prichard)
- Cauliflower Alley Club
  - Courage Award (2021)
