= Boris Malenko =

American professional wrestler (1933–1994)

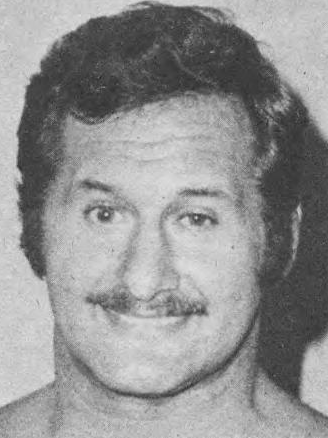

Personal information
- Born: Lawrence J. Simon; June 28, 1933 Newark, New Jersey, U.S.
- Died: September 1, 1994 (aged 61) Tampa, Florida, U.S.
- Cause of death: Leukemia
- Family: Joe Malenko (son); Dean Malenko (son)

Professional wrestling career
- Ring name(s): Boris Malenko; Crusher Duggan; Larry Simon; Laurence Malenko; The Great Malenko; The Masked Muscovite; Mr. Jacksonville; Mr. Miami; Otto Von Krupp
- Billed height: 5 ft 10 in (1.78 m)
- Billed weight: 220 lb (100 kg; 16 st)
- Billed from: Moscow, Soviet Union (as Boris Malenko); Germany (as Otto Von Krupp)
- Debut: 1955
- Retired: 1980

Lawrence J. Simon (June 28, 1933 – September 1, 1994), better known by the ring name Boris Malenko (Russian: Бори́с Маленко́, IPA: [bɐˈrʲis mɐˈlʲenkə]), was an American professional wrestler and professional wrestling trainer. He is best known for his appearances with Championship Wrestling from Florida and Big Time Wrestling in the 1960s and 1970s as a Russian heel. He was the father of professional wrestlers Joe and Dean Malenko.

== Early life ==
Simon was born in Newark, New Jersey and raised in Irvington, New Jersey. As a teenager, Simon competed at amateur wrestling in YMCAs. Before becoming a professional wrestler, he worked as a truck driver in the Garment District in New York City.

== Professional wrestling career ==
Simon made his professional debut in 1955 as "Larry Simon", wrestling in the Eastern United States. In 1957, he joined the Dallas, Texas-based promotion Big Time Wrestling under the ring name "Crusher Duggan", winning the NWA Texas Heavyweight Championship later that year.

On July 19, 1961, Simon unsuccessfully challenged Buddy Rogers for the NWA World Heavyweight Championship in Jacksonville, Florida.

In September 1961, Simon joined in the Minneapolis, Minnesota-based American Wrestling Association. He adopted the persona of "Otto Von Krupp", a German wrestler who wore jackboots and a swastika on his back. Simon formed a tag team with Bob Geigel, with the duo winning the AWA World Tag Team Championship in November 1961, holding it until Simon left the promotion in January 1962.

In 1962, playing upon Cold War tensions, Simon adopted the persona of "Boris Malenko", an agent of the Soviet Union. He was occasionally billed as "The Great Malenko"; a pun, with "Malenko" being Russian for "little", or as "Dr. Malenko" or "Professor Malenko". He built his career in South Florida, where his gimmick made him a hated heel among the Cuban population. Over the next decade, he held the NWA Florida Heavyweight Championship twice, the NWA Florida Tag Team Championship twice, the NWA Southern Heavyweight Championship (Florida version) once, the NWA Southern Tag Team Championship (Florida version) once, and the NWA Brass Knuckles Championship (Florida version) eight times. His main rivals included Eddie Graham, Wahoo McDaniel, Johnny Valentine, Joe Scarpa, and José Lothario. In an angle in 1966, after Malenko bloodied Sammy Steamboat by biting his ear, Eddie Graham stormed the ring and punched Malenko's dentures out of his mouth, then crushed them.

In 1970, Malenko returned to Big Time Wrestling, where he held the NWA American Heavyweight Championship and the NWA Texas Tag Team Championship. He had a heated feud with Wahoo McDaniel, with McDaniel defeating him in a hair versus hair match in July 1970. A bout between the two in the Astrodome set a longstanding attendance record. In December 1970, McDaniel defeated Malenko in a loser leaves town match, marking his departure from the promotion. During his time with Big Time Wrestling he was managed by Lord Charles Montegue.

On May 9, 1972, Malenko and Bob Roop defeated Bearcat Wright and Bobby Shane to win the NWA Florida Tag Team Championship, and six days later, Malenko defeated Wright in singles competition to win his eighth and final Florida Brass Knuckles title in Orlando. On June 24, 1972, Malenko and Johnny Weaver defeated Mike Webster and The Professional for his second run with the Florida Tag Team titles.

Malenko toured Japan with All Japan Pro Wrestling in 1973 and New Japan Pro-Wrestling in 1974. During his time with NJPW, Malenko wrestled a number of high-profile bouts with Antonio Inoki.

In the late 1970s, Malenko wrestled for the Knoxville, Tennessee-based promotion Southeastern Championship Wrestling, winning both the NWA Southeastern Heavyweight Championship (Northern Division) and the NWA Southeastern Television Championship in 1978. He became the manager of Jerry Blackwell after it was claimed he had acquired the mortgage to Blackwell's family farm, forcing him to fight on his behalf. The angle ended after Ron Garvin paid off the mortgage, freeing Blackwell to attack Malenko.

Malenko retired in 1980 and opened a training school in Florida with his sons Dean and Joe. He died of leukemia in Tampa Florida at age 61 in late 1994.

== Wrestlers trained ==
- Dean Malenko
- Joe Malenko
- Kane
- Bart Gunn
- Tugboat
- Al Perez
- Norman Smiley
- Gangrel
- Barry Horowitz
- X-Pac
- Bobby Blaze
- Bob Orton Jr.
- Buddy Landel
- Chris Champion
- Eddie Sharkey
- Horace Hogan
- Marc Mero
- Perry Saturn
- Van Hammer
- Carl Malenko (not related)
- Bob Cook
- Frank Reyes
- Debbie Malenko (not related)

== Personal life ==
Simon, who was Jewish, had two sons, Dean and Jody, both of whom became professional wrestlers. He died in September 1994 from leukemia.

== Championships and accomplishments ==
- All-Star Wrestling Omaha
  - Nebraska Heavyweight Championship (1 time)
- American Wrestling Association
  - AWA World Tag Team Championship (1 time) - with Bob Geigel
- Championship Wrestling from Florida
  - NWA Brass Knuckles Championship (Florida version) (8 times)
  - NWA Florida Heavyweight Championship (1 time)
  - NWA Florida Tag Team Championship (2 times) - with Bob Roop (1 time) and Johnny Walker (1 time)
  - NWA Southern Heavyweight Championship (Florida version) (1 time)
  - NWA Southern Tag Team Championship (Florida version) (1 time) - with Johnny Valentine
- George Tragos/Lou Thesz Professional Wrestling Hall of Fame
  - Trainers Award (2023)
- National Wrestling Alliance
  - NWA Hall of Fame (Class of 2016)
- NWA Big Time Wrestling
  - NWA American Heavyweight Championship (1 time)
  - NWA Texas Heavyweight Championship (1 time)
  - NWA Texas Tag Team Championship (1 time) - with Killer Karl Kox
- Southeastern Championship Wrestling
  - NWA Southeastern Heavyweight Championship (Northern Division) (1 time)
  - NWA Southeastern Television Championship (1 time)
- WWE
  - WWE Hall of Fame (Class of 2018)

== Luchas de Apuestas record ==
Winner (wager)	Loser (wager)	Location	Event	Date	Notes
Wahoo McDaniel (hair)	Boris Malenko (hair)	Houston, Texas	Live event	July 10, 1970	
Ronnie Garvin (hair)	Boris Malenko (hair)	Knoxville, Tennessee	Live event	October 13, 1979	

== See also ==
- List of Jewish professional wrestlers
