= NWA Tri-State Heavyweight Championship =

Professional wrestling championship

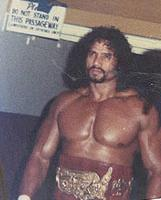
- Jimmy Snuka is a former NWA Tri-State Heavyweight Champion.

Details
- Promotion: NWA Tri-State; NWA Mid-America (1960-1974)
- Date established: March 31, 1954
- Date retired: No later than March 1982

Other name(s)
- NWA Tri-State Heavyweight Championship (Alabama version)
Statistics
- First champion(s): Whitey Whittler
- Final champion(s): Paul Jones
- Most reigns: Jimmy Golden (4)
- Longest reign: Mike George (81 days)
- Shortest reign: Whitey Whittler (28 days)

The NWA Tri-State Heavyweight Championship was a professional wrestling heavyweight championship in Tri-States Wrestling (NWA Tri-State). The original version was created in 1954, however, it was phased out in favor of the NWA World Junior Heavyweight Championship.

The Alabama version of the NWA Tri-State Heavyweight Championship existed from 1960 until 1974. It was defended primarily in Alabama under the banner of NWA Tri-State Wrestling, and at times in Tennessee for NWA Mid-America. Because the championship was a professional wrestling championship, it was not won or lost competitively but instead by the decision of the bookers of a wrestling promotion. The championship was awarded after the chosen team "won" a match to maintain the illusion that professional wrestling is a competitive sport.

The title was revived to replace the NWA North American Heavyweight Championship as the promotion's top singles title after Bill Watts left to form Mid-South Wrestling in 1979. It was vacated and decommissioned when Tri-State promoter Leroy McGuirk closed the promotion in 1982.

== Title history ==
Key

Symbol	Meaning
#	The overall championship reign
Reign	The reign number for the specific set of wrestlers listed.
Event	The event promoted by the respective promotion in which the title changed hands
—	Used for vacated reigns in order to not count it as an official reign
	Indicates periods of unknown lineage
(NLT)	Indicates that the championship changed hands "No Later Than" a certain date.
¤	Indicates that the data presented in this cell is uncertain.

== Names ==
Name	Years
NWA Tri-State Heavyweight Championship	March 31, 1954 – April 28, 1954
NWA Tri-State Heavyweight Championship (Alabama version)	September 12, 1960 – October 3, 1974
NWA Tri-State Heavyweight Championship	September 7, 1980 – 1982
NWA-MCW Heavyweight Championship	1982 – March 1982

== Title history ==
=== NWA Tri-State Heavyweight Championship (Original version) ===
Key
No.	Overall reign number
Reign	Reign number for the specific champion
Days	Number of days held

No.	Champion	Championship change			Reign statistics		Notes	Ref.
No.	Champion	Date	Event	Location	Reign	Days	Notes	Ref.
1	Whitey Whittler	March 31, 1954	House show	Joplin, MO	1	28	Defeated Red Berry in a tournament final.	
2	Red Berry	April 28, 1954	House show	Joplin, MO	1			

=== NWA Tri-State Heavyweight Championship (Alabama version) ===
Key
No.	Overall reign number
Reign	Reign number for the specific champion
Days	Number of days held

No.	Champion	Championship change			Reign statistics		Notes	Ref.
No.	Champion	Date	Event	Location	Reign	Days	Notes	Ref.
1	Joe Scarpa	September 12, 1960	Tri-State show	Memphis, Tennessee	1	(Note: The length of this reign is too uncertain to calculate.)	Defeated Mario Galento in tournament final to become the first champion.	
Championship history is unrecorded from September 12, 1960 to September 1971 (NLT).
2	Jerry Lawler	September 1971 (NLT)	Tri-State show	(Note: The location of the match was not captured as part of the championship documentation.)	1	(Note: The date the championship was won and lost has not been documented which means the championship reign lasted anywhere between 1 day and 424 days.)	Won a battle royal, last eliminating Jimmy Golden.	
Championship history is unrecorded from September 1971 (NLT) to October 29, 1971 (NLT).
3	Jimmy Golden	October 29, 1971 (NLT)	Tri-State show		1	(Note: The date the championship was won and lost has not been documented which means the championship reign lasted anywhere between 1 day and 64 days.)		
4	Tony Russo	November 5, 1971	Tri-State show	Gadsden, Alabama	1	20		
5	Gary Martin	November 25, 1971	Tri-State show	Anniston, Alabama	1	(Note: The date the championship was won and lost has not been documented which means the championship reign lasted anywhere between 1 day and 402 days.)		
6	Tony Russo	December 1971 (NLT)	Tri-State show		2	(Note: The date the championship was won and lost has not been documented which means the championship reign lasted anywhere between 1 day and 20 days.)		
7	The Golden Hawk	December 16, 1971	Tri-State show	Anniston, Alabama	1	(Note: The date the championship was won and lost has not been documented which means the championship reign lasted anywhere between 1 day and 91 days.)	Still billed as champion on January 6, 1972	
Championship history is unrecorded from December 16, 1971 to March 16, 1972 (NLT).
8	Buddy Wayne	March 16, 1972 (NLT)	Tri-State show		1	(Note: The date the championship was won and lost has not been documented which means the championship reign lasted anywhere between 1 day and 90 days.)		
9	Jimmy Golden	April 6, 1972¤	Tri-State show	Anniston, Alabama¤	2	(Note: The date the championship was won and lost has not been documented which means the championship reign lasted anywhere between 1 day and 182 days.)	Still champion as of 72/06/08	
Championship history is unrecorded from April 6, 1972¤ to October 5, 1972 (NLT).
10	Ramon Perez	October 5, 1972 (NLT)	Tri-State show		1	(Note: The date the championship was won and lost has not been documented which means the championship reign lasted anywhere between 1 day and 258 days.)		
Championship history is unrecorded from October 5, 1972 (NLT) to December 21, 1972 (NLT).
11	Tony Russo	December 21, 1972 (NLT)	Tri-State show		3	(Note: The date the championship was won and lost has not been documented which means the championship reign lasted anywhere between 1 day and 112 days.)		
Championship history is unrecorded from December 21, 1972 (NLT) to January 26, 1973 (NLT).
12	Buddy Wayne	January 26, 1973 (NLT)	Tri-State show		2	(Note: The date the championship was won and lost has not been documented which means the championship reign lasted anywhere between 1 day and 440 days.)		
Championship history is unrecorded from January 26, 1973 (NLT) to March 7, 1974 (NLT).
13	Jimmy Golden	March 7, 1974 (NLT)	Tri-State show		3	(Note: The date the championship was won and lost has not been documented which means the championship reign lasted anywhere between 1 day and 404 days.)		
14	Jack Donovan	March 14, 1974¤	Tri-State show	Anniston, Alabama¤	1	70		
15	Jimmy Golden	May 23, 1974¤	Tri-State show	Anniston, Alabama¤	4	(Note: The date the championship was won and lost has not been documented which means the championship reign lasted anywhere between 1 day and 133 days.)		
Championship history is unrecorded from May 23, 1974¤ to October 3, 1974 (NLT).
16	Dennis Condrey	October 3, 1974 (NLT)	Tri-State show		1	(Note: The date the championship was won and lost has not been documented which means the championship reign lasted anywhere between 1 day and 221 days.)		
—	Deactivated	1974	—	—	—	—	Championship abandoned.	

=== NWA Tri-State Heavyweight Championship (Final version) ===
Key
No.	Overall reign number
Reign	Reign number for the specific champion
Days	Number of days held

No.	Champion	Championship change			Reign statistics		Notes	Ref.
No.	Champion	Date	Event	Location	Reign	Days	Notes	Ref.
1	Tom Jones	1981	Tri-State show	N/A	1			
2	Mr. Pogo	1981	Tri-State show	N/A	2			
3	Tom Jones	1981	Tri-State show	N/A	2			
4	Mike George	February 28, 1981	Tri-State show	Tulsa, OK	1	30		
5	Bob Sweetan	March 30, 1981	Tri-State show	Tulsa, OK	1	63		
6	Mike George	June 1, 1981	Tri-State show	Tulsa, OK	2	81		
—	Vacated	August 21, 1981	—	—	—	—	Championship vacated when George leaves the territory.	
7	Jimmy Snuka	January 18, 1982	Tri-State show	Tulsa, OK	1	42	Won tournament.	
8	Paul Jones	March 1, 1982	Tri-State show	Tulsa, OK	1			
9	Eddie Mansfield	March 1982	Tri-State show	N/A	1	(Note: The exact date on which the title was won is not known, which means their title reign lasted between 1 and 15 days.)		
10	Paul Jones	March 17, 1982	Tri-State show	Springfield, MO	2			
—	Deactivated	1982	—	—	—	—	NWA Tri-State closed in 1982, and the championship was subsequently abandoned.	

== List of top combined reigns ==
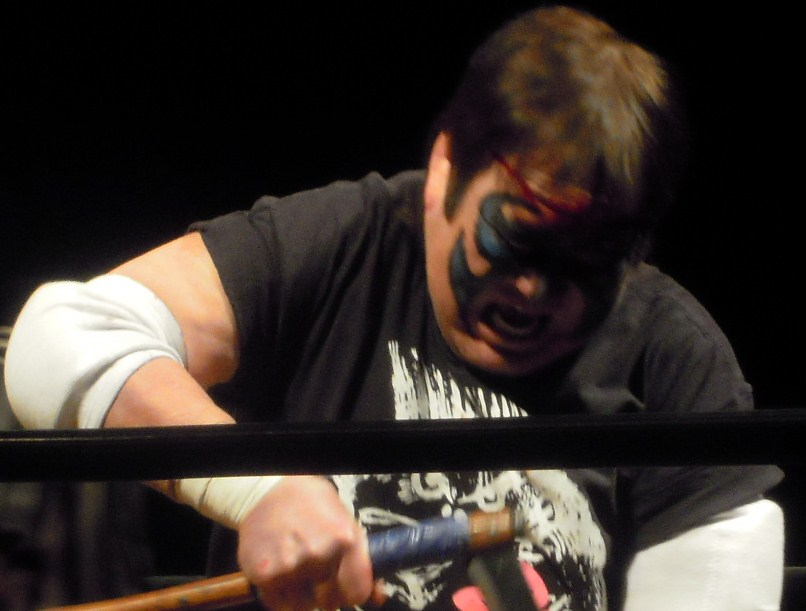
Mr. Pogo, who was the fifth longest-reigning Tri-State Heavyweight Champion

¤	The exact length of several title reigns are uncertain, so the shortest possible length is used.

List of combined reigns
Rank	Champion	No. of reigns	Combined days
1	Mike George	2	111
2	Bob Sweetan	1	63
3	Terry Gibbs	1	55¤
4	Jimmy Snuka	1	42¤
5	Mr. Pogo	2	29¤
6	Whitey Whittler	1	28
7	Eddie Mansfield	1	1¤
8	Red Berry	1	N/A
9	Terry Orndorff	1	N/A
10	Tom Jones	2	N/A
11	Paul Jones	2	N/A
