= Chief Jay Strongbow =

American professional wrestler (1928–2012)

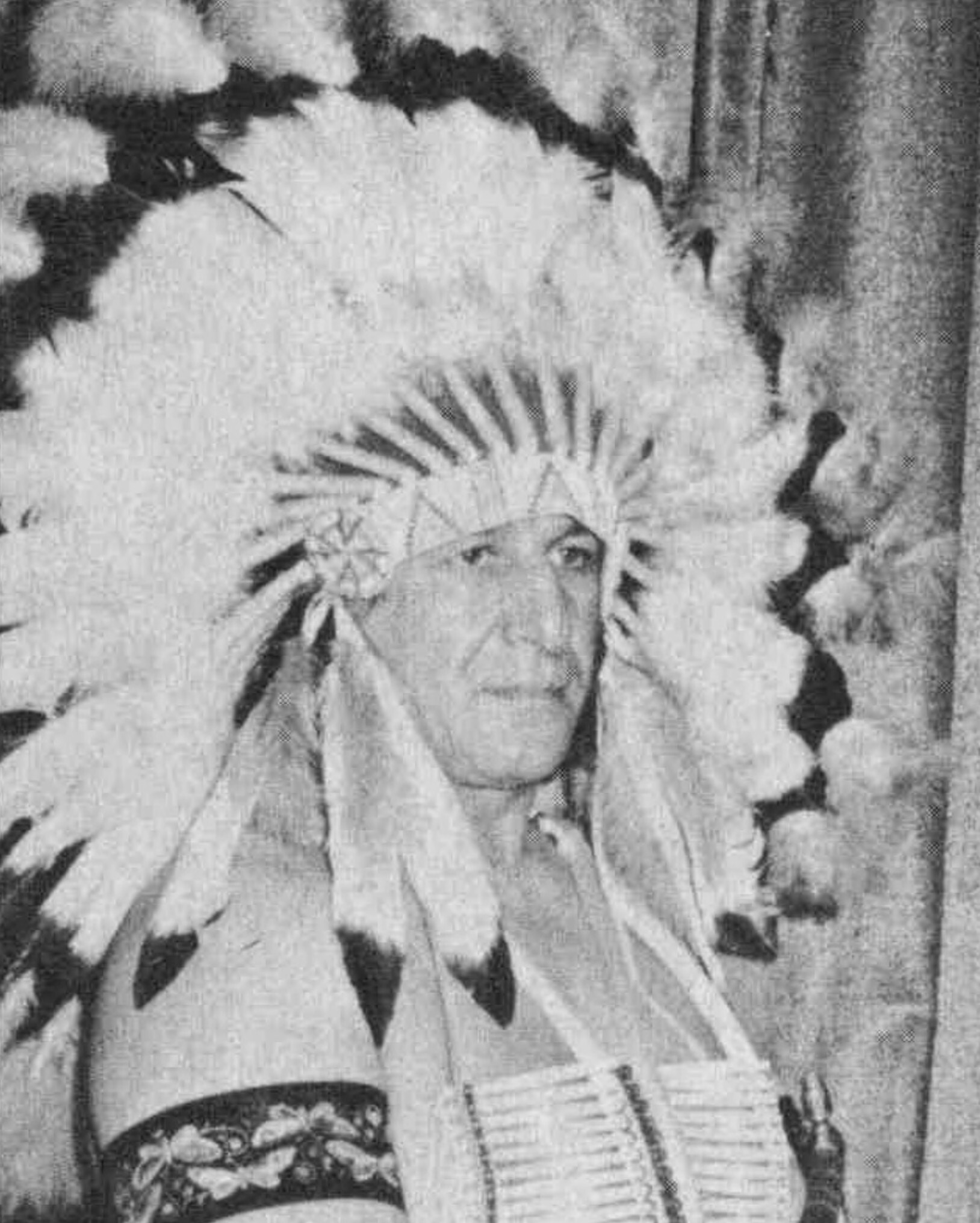
- Strongbow in 1973

Personal information
- Born: Luke Joseph Scarpa; October 4, 1928 Philadelphia, Pennsylvania, U.S.
- Died: April 3, 2012 (aged 83) Griffin, Georgia, U.S.
- Children: 2, including Mark Young

Professional wrestling career
- Ring name(s): Chief Jay Strongbow; Joe Scarpa
- Billed height: 6 ft 0 in (183 cm)
- Billed weight: 247 lb (112 kg)
- Billed from: Pawhuska, Oklahoma
- Trained by: Chief Don Eagle
- Debut: 1947
- Retired: November 16, 1987

Luke Joseph Scarpa (October 4, 1928 – April 3, 2012) was an American professional wrestler and WWE Hall of Famer who was best known by the ring name Chief Jay Strongbow. He portrayed a Native American wrestler who wore a war bonnet to the ring and would "go on the warpath" when the fans started cheering him against an opponent. In reality, Scarpa was an Italian-American who portrayed an Indian to stand out. His best accomplishments are in WWF where he was a four-time World Tag-Team Champion.

== Professional wrestling career ==
=== National Wrestling Alliance (1947–1970) ===
Scarpa's wrestling career began in 1947, under his real name. He was trained by second generation Native American wrestler Chief Don Eagle. He was a standout in the Georgia and Florida territories of the National Wrestling Alliance throughout the 1950s and 1960s, winning several championships and becoming a fan favorite. He won the NWA (Georgia) Southern Tag Team titles with Chief Little Eagle in Georgia Championship wrestling in 1965. During his time in Georgia he was also the Inaugural NWA National Television Championship when he won an 8-man tournament by beating Assassin #2 in the finals. By the time he went over to WWWF, he was already a 12 Tag-Team and 6 Time singles champion.

=== World Wide Wrestling Federation (1970–1979) ===
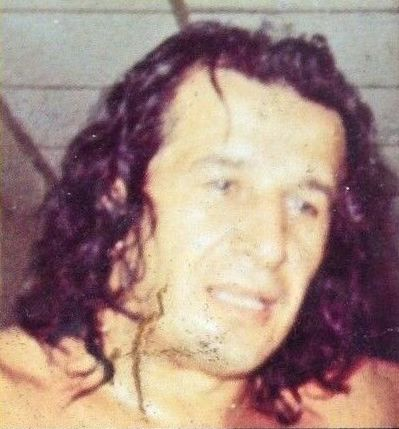
Strongbow in 1973

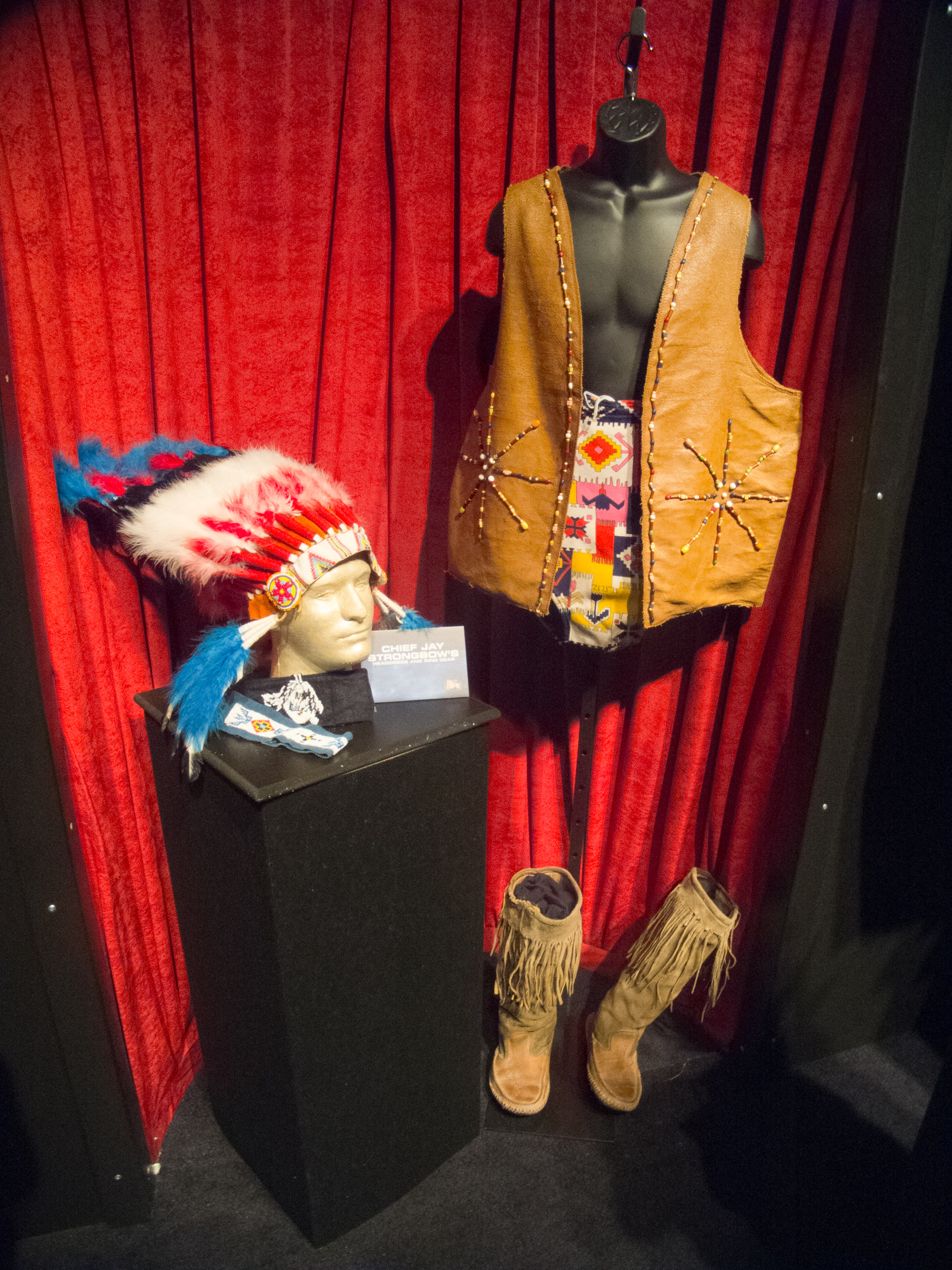
Strongbow's wrestling attire.

In 1970, Scarpa began working for Vincent J. McMahon's World Wide Wrestling Federation as Chief Jay Strongbow, a Native American gimmick complete with a traditional headdress and Native themed wrestling moves. He feuded with the likes of "The Golden Greek" Spiros Arion, "Handsome Jimmy" Valiant, and Superstar Billy Graham, nearly winning the WWWF World Heavyweight Championship. A memorable match against "Iron Mike" McCord featured Strongbow applying his sleeper hold. But Lou Albano, McCord's manager, interfered by smashing a cast on the Chief's forehead. It was alleged that Strongbow had previously jumped Albano in the locker room, breaking his arm. McCord was disqualified, but Strongbow was cut wide open by Albano's blows. Strongbow settled the score in front of a sold-out crowd at Madison Square Garden, beating Captain Lou Albano convincingly.

Strongbow picked up a win at Madison Square Garden in the summer of 1970, shortly after he entered the WWWF, pinning top contender Crusher Verdu, who was managed by Lou Albano.

In 1975, he began feuding with Spiros Arion. Arion, a popular and seemingly unbeatable babyface, returned to the WWWF after an absence and teamed with Strongbow. Arion turned on Strongbow, destroying his headdress on Philadelphia television after he had tied Strongbow in the ropes, and rubbed the feathers in his face. Arion was now a heel, and pinned Strongbow in eastern arenas as he went on to challenge champion Bruno Sammartino.

Strongbow won his first WWWF World Tag Team Championship on May 22, 1972, with partner Sonny King. They defeated the team of Baron Mikel Scicluna and King Curtis Iaukea. Strongbow and King held the title for a month before losing it to the team of Mr. Fuji and Professor Toru Tanaka on June 27.

Four and a half years later, on December 7, 1976, Strongbow won his second WWWF World Tag Team Championship, this time with partner Billy White Wolf. The team won the title in a three-team tournament, defeating The Executioners and Nikolai Volkoff and Tor Kamata. Their reign was cut short in August 1977 when the belts were vacated due to White Wolf suffering a neck injury at the hands of Ken Patera's Swinging Neckbreaker. In October 1978, Strongbow came to blows with his tag-team partner, 'High Chief' Peter Maivia in a match with The Yukon Lumberjacks, both of them feuding over who should start the match. When things seemed to settle, Maivia came up behind Strongbow and clubbed him on the back of the head before walking off back to the dressing room leaving Strongbow to be assaulted by the Yukon Lumberjacks.

In 1979, he feuded with Greg "The Hammer" Valentine, who broke Strongbow's leg. The two wrestled all over the WWF circuit, including an "Indian Strap match" at Madison Square Garden on July 30, 1979.

=== Big Time Wrestling (1976) ===
Strongbow also competed for The Sheik's Big Time Wrestling promotion in Detroit. He had a memorable feud with "Bulldog" Don Kent, which culminated in a "shark cage match" in 1976. Strongbow and Kent fought inside of a small shark cage, with the first man to escape being declared the winner. With an assist from fellow fan favorite Mark Lewin, Strongbow was able to escape the shark cage victorious.

=== NWA Georgia / Mid-Atlantic and other territories (1980–1981) ===
After wrestling in the WWF for 9 years, Strongbow went to work for Georgia Championship Wrestling and Mid-Atlantic Championship Wrestling. In Detroit he feuded with Don Kent once again. Then he feuded with Baron Von Raschke in Georgia. He won the WWC Caribbean Heavyweight Championship defeating Luke Graham on October 11, 1980, in Puerto Rico. Then dropped the title on December 20 to "The Honky Tonk Man" Danny Condrey. In 1981 he went to Mid-Atlantic Championship Wrestling where he feuded with Kevin Sullivan.

=== World Wrestling Federation (1982–1986) ===
In 1982, Strongbow formed a tag team with his on-screen brother, Jules Strongbow. On June 28, the Strongbows won the tag team championship from the team of Mr. Fuji and Mr. Saito in New York City's Madison Square Garden. During the match, special guest referee Ivan Putski counted the winning fall, but did not see Fuji's foot draped over the bottom rope. On the July 13 episode of Championship Wrestling, the Strongbows lost the titles back to Fuji and Saito, but on the October 26 episode of Championship Wrestling, the Strongbows defeated Fuji and Saito for their second WWF Tag Team Championship reign as a team. On the March 8, 1983 episode of Championship Wrestling, the Strongbows lost the titles to The Wild Samoans (Afa and Sika). After failing in regaining the belts, the Strongbows disbanded. Strongbow went into jobbing. In 1986, he teamed with Steve Gatorwolf as The Indians.

=== Retirement (1986–2011) ===
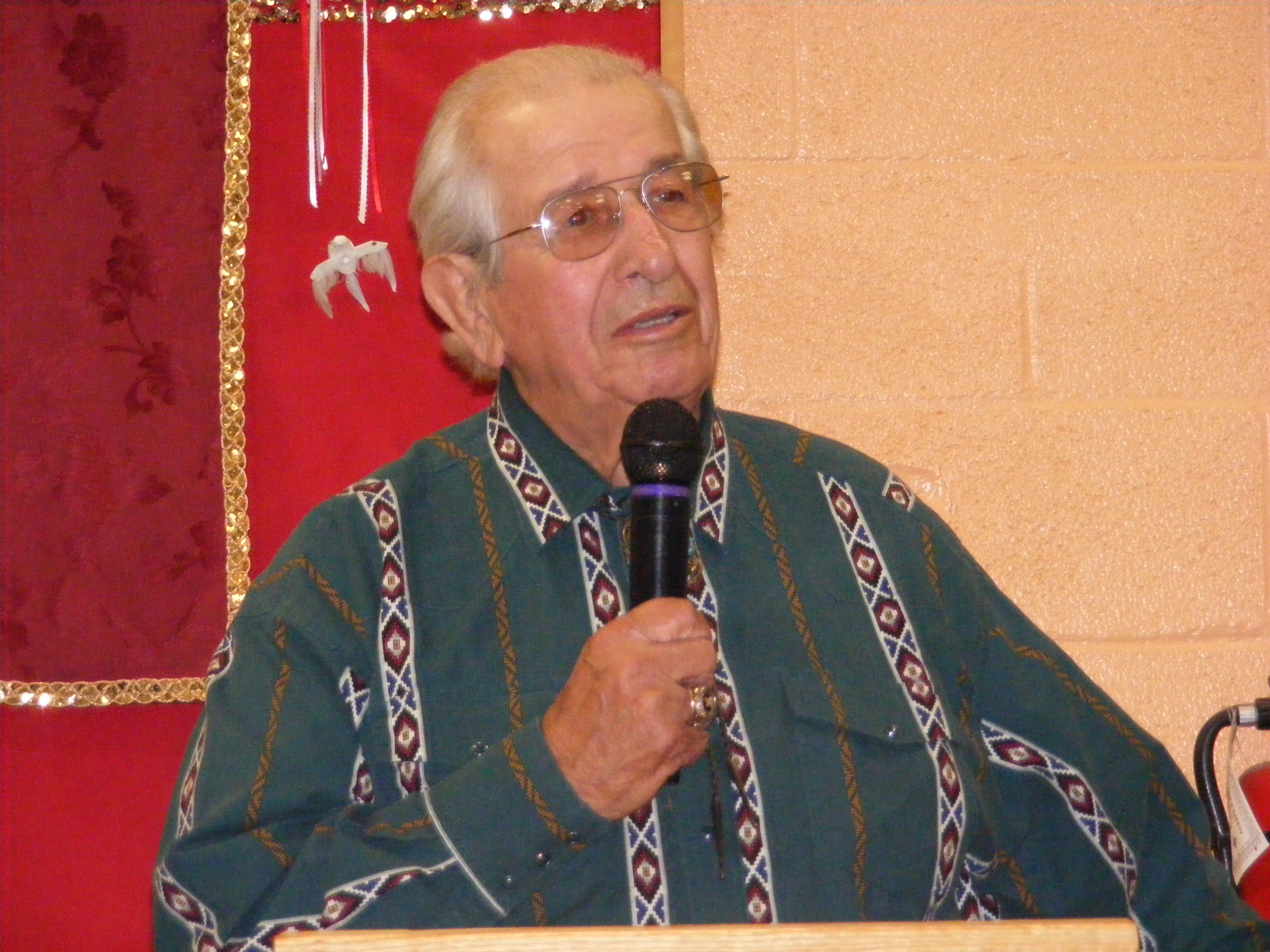
Strongbow in 2011

Strongbow retired in 1986, but would still step back into the ring from time to time, most notably for a legends battle royal in East Rutherford, New Jersey in 1987. In retirement, Strongbow became a WWF road agent and worked in the company's front office. Strongbow was not a popular backstage figure, derided by The Honky Tonk Man and Bret Hart amongst others whilst Randy Savage stated that Strongbow "killed more young wrestlers’ careers than drugs."

He also participated in a 1994 storyline in which he mentored Tatanka (an actual Native American of the Lumbee tribe). Strongbow was inducted into the WWF Hall of Fame class of 1994 by Gorilla Monsoon. Strongbow's last appearance in WWE was a brief appearance on the November 17, 2008 episode of Monday Night Raw when Stephanie McMahon introduced him to the audience in Atlanta.

== Personal life ==
Though his Chief Jay Strongbow character was billed as coming from Pawhuska, Oklahoma, he actually hailed from Nutley, New Jersey, and attended Nutley High School.

His son, Joe Jr. wrestled in the 1980s and early 1990s mainly as Mark Pyle and Mark Young in the WWF from 1986–1990 and Vince Young in WCW. Joe Jr. died in 2016 at the age of 48. He also has a daughter Connie Pacheco of Portland, Oregon. Following his retirement, he lived on a farm in Georgia.

== Death ==
Scarpa fell at his home in late 2011 and was hospitalized. He died in that hospital on April 3, 2012, at the age of 83. He was buried in Griffin, Georgia.

== Championships and accomplishments ==
- Georgia Championship Wrestling
  - NWA Southern Tag Team Championship (Georgia version) (1 time) - with Chief Little Eagle
  - NWA National Television Championship (1 time)
- Jim Crockett Promotions
  - NWA Southern Tag Team Championship (Mid-Atlantic version) (2 times) - with Don Curtis
- Championship Wrestling from Florida
  - NWA Brass Knuckles Championship (Florida version) (2 times)
  - NWA Florida Heavyweight Championship (1 time)
  - NWA Southern Tag Team Championship (Florida version) (3 times) - with Jose Lothario
  - NWA World Tag Team Championship (Florida version) (1 time) - with Don Curtis
- Gulf Coast Championship Wrestling
  - NWA Gulf Coast Heavyweight Championship (1 time)
  - NWA Southern Tag Team Championship (Gulf Coast version) (2 times) - with Lee Fields
- NWA Mid-America
  - NWA Mid-America World Tag Team Championship (3 times) - with Lester Welch (2) and Alex Perez (1)
  - NWA Tri-State Heavyweight Championship (Alabama version) (1 time)
- Mid-South Sports
  - NWA Georgia Heavyweight Championship (1 time)
  - NWA Macon Tag Team Championship (1 time) - with El Mongol
  - NWA World Tag Team Championship (Georgia version) (1 time) - with Don Curtis
- New England Pro Wrestling Hall of Fame
  - Class of 2011
- Pro Wrestling Illustrated
  - PWI Most Popular Wrestler of the Year (1973)
  - PWI Most Inspirational Wrestler of the Year (1979)
  - PWI ranked him # 214 of the 500 best singles wrestlers during the "PWI Years" in 2003.
- Professional Wrestling Hall of Fame and Museum
  - (Class of 2009)
- World Wrestling Council
  - WWC Caribbean Heavyweight Championship (1 time)
- World Wide Wrestling Federation / World Wrestling Federation
  - WWWF/WWF Tag Team Championship (4 times) - with Sonny King (1), Billy White Wolf (1), and Jules Strongbow (2)
  - WWF Hall of Fame (Class of 1994)
- Wrestling Observer Newsletter

- Most Washed Up Wrestler (1983)
