= Bob Cook (professional wrestler) =

American professional wrestler (born 1963)

Personal information
- Born: Robert Cook; August 20, 1963 (age 62) Portland, Michigan, U.S.

Professional wrestling career
- Ring name(s): Bob Cook; Mighty Yankee #2; Masked Superstar #2; Piranha Steele
- Billed height: 6 ft 1 in (1.85 m)
- Billed weight: 266 lb (121 kg)
- Billed from: North Port, Florida
- Trained by: Boris Malenko; Dean Malenko
- Debut: 1981
- Retired: 2024

Robert Cook (born August 20, 1963) is an American professional wrestler better known by his ring name Bob Cook best known for working in the World Championship Wrestling, Championship Wrestling From Florida, and the World Wrestling Federation during the late 1980s and early 1990s.

== Professional wrestling career ==
Cook was trained by Boris Malenko and made his professional wrestling debut in 1981. During the early years of his career, he worked for Championship Wrestling from Florida.

In 1987, he teamed with Jerry Grey as the Mighty Yankees. Cook was Mighty Yankee #2 and they won the NWA Florida Tag Team Championship defeating Mike Graham and Steve Keirn. They dropped the titles back to Graham and Keirn a month later. They also worked in Memphis until disbanding in 1988. Cook also teamed with Bucky Seigler in Memphis in 1987. Also during this time, Cook worked for Jim Crockett Promotions in the Mid-Atlantic.

In 1989, after the closures of CWA, Florida, and Mid-Atlantic, Cook worked for World Championship Wrestling as enhancement talent competing against Sting (wrestler), Brian Pillman, Mick Foley Ric Flair, Ricky Steamboat, Steiner Brothers, Lex Luger, Ron Simmons, and Dustin Rhodes. He left WCW in 1994.

In 1995, Cook worked for the World Wrestling Federation working against Bam Bam Bigelow, Bob Holly, 1-2-3 Kid, Hakushi, Lex Luger, Kama, Davey Boy Smith and Savio Vega.

In 1996. he retired from wrestling.

Then in 2010, he came out of retirement working in the independents in Florida. On June 26, 2011, Cook won the Malenko Cup Battle Royal for Definitive Wrestling International's 2nd Annual Malenko Memorial Cup in Riverview, Florida in tribute to his trainer Boris.

His most recent match was teaming with George South losing to Ricky Morton and Tommy Rich at SuperStar Wars Wrestling in Gastonia, North Carolina on April 20, 2024.

== Championships and accomplishments ==
- Championship Wrestling from Florida
  - NWA Florida Tag Team Championship (1 time) - with Mighty Yankee #1
