= Jerry Lawler =

American professional wrestler and color commentator (born 1949)

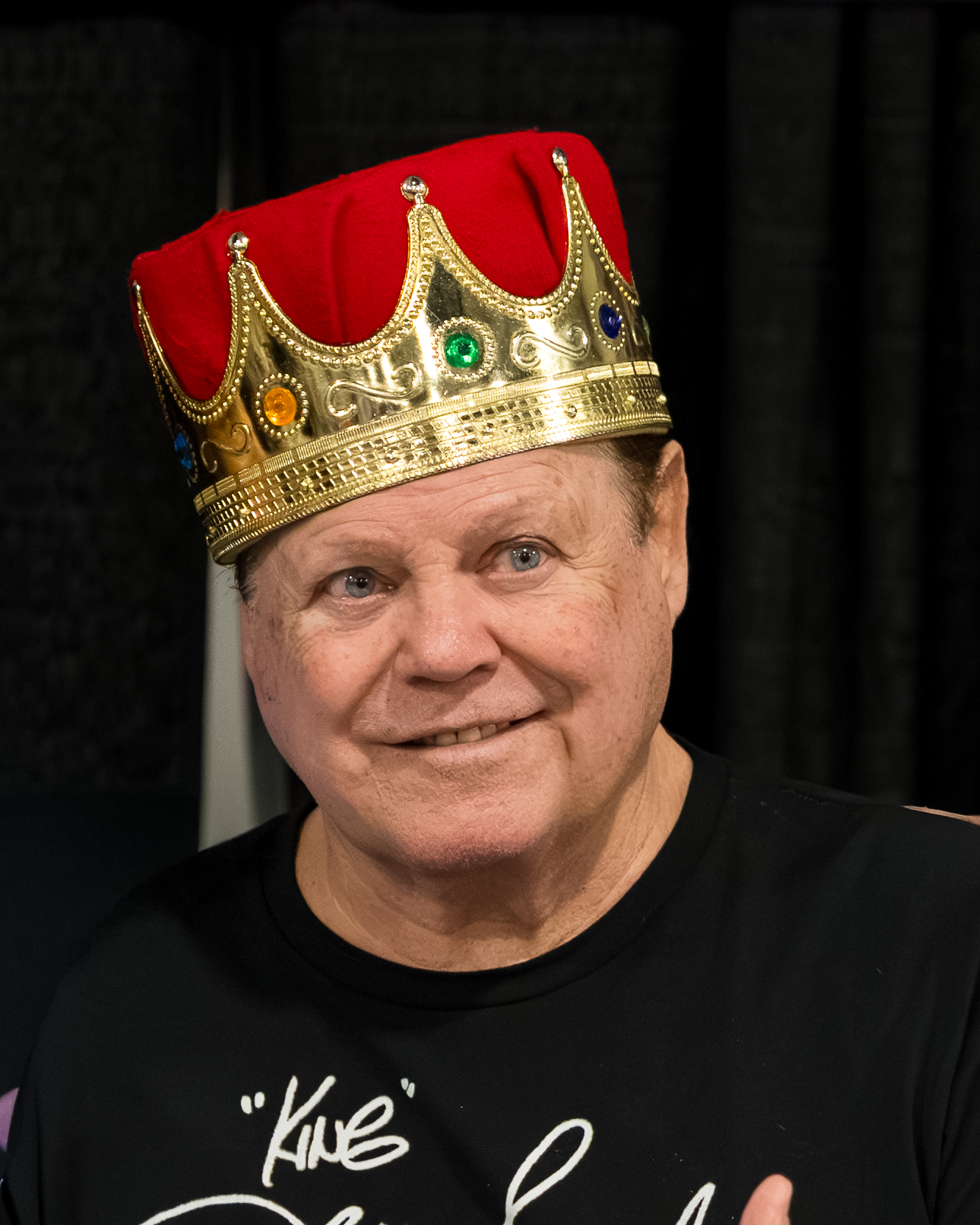
- Lawler in 2026

Personal information
- Born: Jerry O'Neil Lawler; November 29, 1949 (age 76) Memphis, Tennessee, U.S.
- Spouses: Kay Lawler (m. 1971; div. 1978); Paula Lawler (m. 1982; div. 1991); Stacy Carter (m. 2000; div. 2003)
- Children: 3, including Brian
- Relatives: The Honky Tonk Man (cousin); Carl Fergie (cousin)

Professional wrestling career
- Ring name: Jerry "The King" Lawler
- Billed height: 6 ft 0 in (183 cm)
- Billed weight: 243 lb (110 kg)
- Billed from: Memphis, Tennessee
- Trained by: Jackie Fargo
- Debut: 1970
- Retired: January 21, 2023

Jerry O'Neil Lawler (born November 29, 1949), better known as Jerry "the King" Lawler, is an American color commentator and professional wrestler signed to WWE under a Legends contract.

Lawler began his career in his hometown of Memphis, Tennessee, in the 1970s, becoming the top star in the regional Continental Wrestling Association (CWA) promotion. In CWA, he held the AWA Southern Heavyweight Championship 57 times and the CWA World Heavyweight Championship once. During this time, he gained national recognition for his feud with comedian Andy Kaufman, which included an appearance on Late Night with David Letterman in 1982. Beyond his duties as an active wrestler, Lawler also worked as a booker in CWA and later in its successor promotion, United States Wrestling Association (USWA). He went on to perform for numerous other territories, winning dozens of championships. He is a one-time AWA World Heavyweight Champion and a three-time WCWA World Heavyweight Champion; he unified the titles by defeating Kerry Von Erich at SuperClash III in 1988, forming the USWA Unified World Heavyweight Championship, which he held 28 times.

In 1992, Lawler joined the World Wrestling Federation (WWF, now WWE), where he performed as a color commentator and occasional wrestler. Debuting as a commentator on Superstars, Lawler became a regular color commentator on Raw in the mid-1990s, forming long-running partnerships with Jim Ross and later Michael Cole. Although never a champion in the promotion, he had high-profile feuds with Bret Hart and challenged The Miz for the WWE Championship in 2011 at the age of 61. He last served on a regular commentary team in 2020, after which he reduced his appearances while remaining affiliated with the company in a limited capacity. Throughout his time in WWE, he also performed on the independent circuit, last wrestling in 2023.

Lawler is a member of the Memphis Wrestling, Professional Wrestling, Wrestling Observer Newsletter, and WWE Halls of Fame. Outside of wrestling, he is known for his work in music, as a commercial artist, and for running for mayor of Memphis in 1999. He is also known for portraying himself in the 1999 Jim Carrey film about Kaufman, Man on the Moon.

== Early life ==
Lawler was born November 29, 1949, in Memphis, Tennessee, where he graduated from Treadwell High School. When he was 19, his father, Jerome Lawler, died.

== Professional wrestling career ==
=== Early career (1970–1977) ===
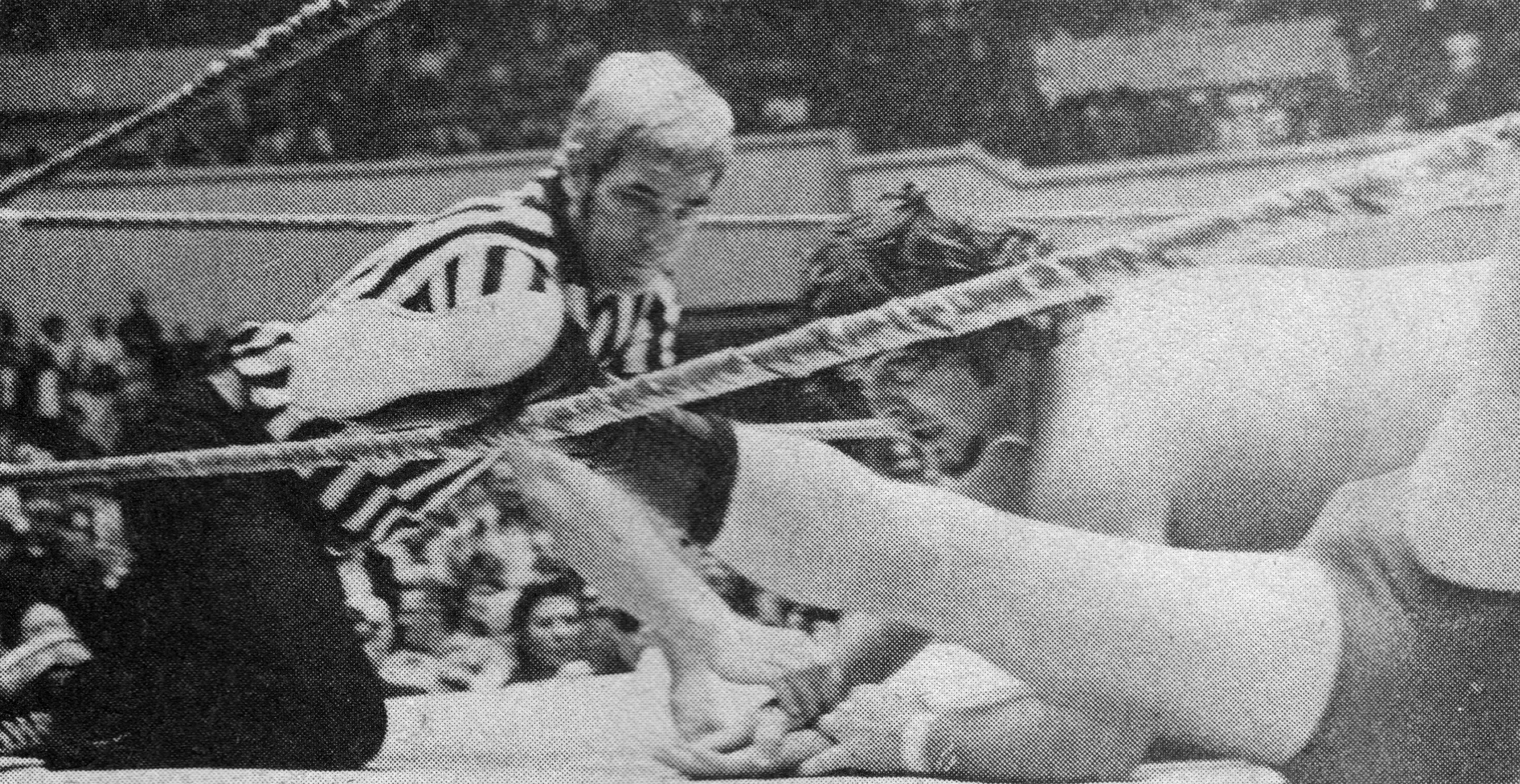
Lawler attempts to pin Jack Brisco in a 1975 match for the NWA World's Heavyweight Championship

While working in Memphis, Tennessee, as a disc jockey, Lawler's artistic ability attracted the attention of local wrestling promoter Aubrey Griffith.

The two made an agreement in which Lawler would give Griffith free publicity in exchange for free wrestling training. Lawler debuted as a wrestler in 1970, and won his first championship in September 1971 by winning a battle royal. He soon won the NWA Southern Tag Team Championship under the managerial service of Sam Bass with partner Jim White. In 1974, Lawler began feuding with Jackie Fargo, who had been his trainer and mentor. This led to a match for the NWA Southern Heavyweight Championship. On July 24, 1974, Lawler won the belt and the title of "King of Wrestling." While Lawler began his career as a heel, he became a face after splitting from Bass at the end of 1974.

During 1975, Lawler teamed with a variety of partners such as Mr Wrestling II, Don Greene, and Bob Orton, Jr. He won the NWA Macon Tag Team Championship twice during this period.

=== Continental Wrestling Association (1977–1989) ===
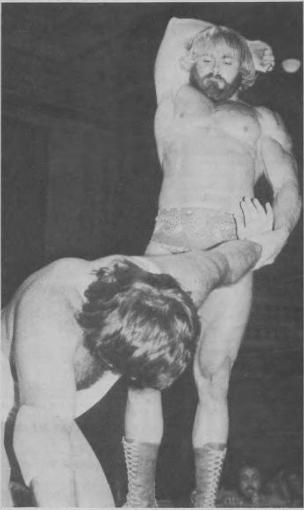
Lawler being worked on in a match against Kevin Sullivan in 1981

In 1977, promoter Jerry Jarrett broke away from Nick Gulas' NWA Mid-America promotion and formed his own promotion, the Continental Wrestling Association. Lawler—Gulas' biggest star—opted to join Jarrett. The CWA quickly outperformed NWA Mid-America, which ultimately folded in 1989. Lawler was both a co-owner of the CWA and its top star.

On November 12, 1979, while working in the CWA, Lawler defeated Superstar Billy Graham to become the CWA World Champion. In 1980, coming off the back end of a feud with The Fabulous Freebirds, his career was put on hold due to a broken leg suffered in a game of touch football, but he returned to the ring after several months.

In 1982, Lawler began a notorious feud with comedian Andy Kaufman. At the time, Kaufman wrestled women as part of his skits and had declared himself the Intergender Heavyweight Champion. On April 5, Lawler, who had taken exception to the skits, wrestled Kaufman in Memphis. During the course of the match, Lawler delivered two piledrivers to Kaufman, the second after the bell rang, sending him to the hospital and nearly breaking his neck. On July 29, Lawler slapped Kaufman in the face on an episode of Late Night with David Letterman. Kaufman responded by shouting profanities and throwing his coffee at Lawler.

Years later, Lawler appeared as himself in the Kaufman biopic Man on the Moon; the film revealed that Lawler's feud with Kaufman had been staged. Lawler later claimed that not only was his entire feud with Kaufman staged, but also the two were actually very good friends.

In 1988, Lawler feuded with Dutch Mantel.

In 1989, the CWA merged with World Class Championship Wrestling to form the United States Wrestling Association.

=== American Wrestling Association (1982–1985, 1987–1988) ===
On March 7, 1983, Lawler won the AWA International Championship by defeating Austin Idol. On May 30, 1983, Bill Dundee defeated Jerry Lawler for the AWA Southern Heavyweight Championship. The feud quickly escalated and on June 6, 1983, the two met in a Loser Leaves Town Match for the title, in which Lawler won. Lawler defeated Ken Patera on July 25 to begin his second reign as the International Champion. Lawler became the NWA Mid America Champion on April 12, 1984, when he defeated Randy Savage for the title. He later returned to the United States, where he defeated Bill Dundee on July 29, 1986, to begin a new reign as the AWA International Champion. Lawler feuded with Tommy Rich, Austin Idol, and Paul E. Dangerously throughout early 1987. The animosity began after controversy over an AWA World Championship title shot involving Nick Bockwinkel. During the feud, the trio defeated Lawler in a steel cage match and cut his hair, which caused a riot in the Mid-South Coliseum.

Lawler won the AWA World Heavyweight Championship from Curt Hennig on May 9, 1988. During his reign, Lawler feuded with World Class Championship Wrestling's Champion Kerry Von Erich. He defeated Von Erich on December 15, 1988, at Superclash III to unify the two titles. Soon after, Lawler's issues with Verne Gagne led to his departure from the AWA, most notably Lawler claiming that he was never paid for the match at Superclash.

=== Other promotions (1981–1989) ===
In 1981, Lawler wrestled for Championship Wrestling From Florida feuding with Dory Funk Jr. and Terry Funk. In 1985, Lawler traveled to Hawaii, where he won the NWA Polynesian Pacific title on January 25, 1986, defeating Lars Anderson. He dropped the title to Tui Selinga on March 26 in Honolulu, Hawaii.

In March 1989, he wrestled for New Japan Pro-Wrestling. He lost to IWGP Heavyweight Champion Tatsumi Fujinami on March 16.

=== World Class Championship Wrestling (1988–1989) ===
Lawler continued feuding with Kerry Von Erich in WCCW. He lost to Von Erich in a steel cage match on November 25, 1988. He would defeat Von Erich by disqualification to retain the WCCW heavyweight title. He wrestled Mil Mascaras to a draw on July 28.

=== United States Wrestling Association (1989–1997) ===
In 1989, Lawler made his debut in the Memphis brand United States Wrestling Association, where he won the USWA Unified World Heavyweight Championship 28 times from 1989 until its doors closed in 1997. While champion, he feuded with The Soultaker, Jimmy Valiant, Kamala, Eddie Gilbert, and Jeff Jarrett.

In 1992, Lawler teamed with Jeff Jarrett in a feud against The Moondogs. The feud between Jarrett/Lawler and The Moondogs was voted the 1992 PWI Feud of the Year by Pro Wrestling Illustrated. He won the USWA World Tag Team Championship with Jarrett four times and twice with Bill Dundee.

Lawler dropped the USWA Unified World Heavyweight for the last time to Dutch Mantel on August 8, 1997, in an All Body Hair match. A month later on September 14 he lost a Bullwhip on a Pole match to Mantel in his last USWA match. The promotion closed in November 1997.

=== World Wrestling Federation (1992–2001) ===
==== Feuds with Bret Hart and Doink the Clown (1992–1995) ====
Lawler began his WWF career in December 1992 as an announcer on Superstars, while still working in USWA. He made his in-ring debut at the 1993 Royal Rumble when he participated in the namesake match, which was won by Yokozuna. From 1993 to 1995, he feuded with Bret Hart and the rest of the Hart family. The feud began at King of the Ring when Lawler interrupted Hart's victory ceremony and attacked Bret.

Lawler claimed that he was the only true king in the World Wrestling Federation (WWF), and the two were scheduled to wrestle at SummerSlam to settle the dispute. At the event, however, Lawler came to the ring on crutches and claimed that he could not wrestle because of injuries suffered in a car accident. Hart faced Lawler's "court jester", Doink the Clown instead, and beat him by submission. Lawler then attacked Hart, revealing that he was not injured. Hart defeated Lawler by submission but refused to release the Sharpshooter. As a result, the referee reversed the decision and awarded the title of "Undisputed King of the World Wrestling Federation" to Lawler. The two would continue to work throughout the fall on the house show circuit, including in steel cages.

Simultaneously, in a form of cross-promotion, Lawler engaged in a bitter feud with Vince McMahon (who at the time was never advertised as the actual owner of the World Wrestling Federation) back in the USWA. There, Lawler played the babyface to his hometown Memphis audience, whereas McMahon (who had always played face in the WWF) was being portrayed as a smug heel intent on dethroning Lawler as the king of professional wrestling. As part of the cross-promotion, McMahon, Bret and Owen Hart, Giant González, Tatanka, and "Macho Man" Randy Savage would begin appearing on USWA television to further the feud. While the program continued in the USWA, the feud between Lawler and McMahon would not be acknowledged on WWF television.

The Hart family (Bret, Owen, Bruce, and Keith) was scheduled to face a team captained by Lawler in an elimination match at Survivor Series. However, Shawn Michaels had to take Lawler's place because Lawler was facing legal troubles. He was indicted for raping and sodomizing a 15-year-old girl, though charges were dropped when the alleged victim recanted her story.

As a result, the feud between Lawler and Vince McMahon back in the USWA was also abruptly discontinued. Lawler did not face Bret Hart at another pay-per-view until the first In Your House, when he beat Hart after Hakushi and his manager Shinja interfered. This set up a "Kiss My Foot" match at King of the Ring 1995, which Bret won. As a result, Lawler was forced to kiss Bret's feet. The feud took one final turn when Lawler introduced his "dentist" Isaac Yankem, D.D.S.. After Hart defeated Yankem by disqualification, however, the feud quickly disappeared.

Following the end of his legal troubles which kept him out of Survivor Series 1993, Lawler eventually returned to the WWF at WrestleMania X, which was also his first appearance as a commentator on a WWF pay-per-view. During the main event of the night, "Rowdy" Roddy Piper served as special guest referee for the second WWF World Heavyweight Championship match. During this Lawler began making disparaging remarks about him. Lawler would continue to berate Piper on later episodes of Monday Night Raw, including bringing a skinny kid into the ring dressed as Piper and forcing him to kiss his feet. This ultimately led to a match between the two at King of the Ring 1994 which Lawler lost.

In the fall of 1994, Lawler initiated a feud with Doink the Clown. Lawler popped the balloons carried by Doink's midget sidekick, Dink. After Doink and Dink retaliated, Lawler introduced a midget sidekick of his own, who he named Queasy. In the following weeks, Doink added two more sidekicks, Wink and Pink, while Lawler introduced Sleazy and Cheesy. This led to an elimination match at Survivor Series 1994, which Lawler's team won. After the match, however, Lawler's team turned on him, joining with Doink's team to attack Lawler.

==== Smoky Mountain and various feuds (1994–1996) ====
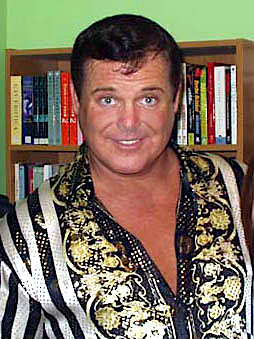
Lawler at a book signing in 2003

In late 1994 and early 1995, Lawler wrestled briefly in Smoky Mountain Wrestling (SMW) while still continuing to commentate sporadically for the WWF. During his absences, Shawn Michaels filled in for him as color commentator on Monday Night Raw. He defeated Tony Anthony for the promotion's top title in January 1995. Lawler was the last SMW Heavyweight Champion defeating Brad Armstrong on Boxing Day 1995. The promotion closed its doors on December 30.

By 1996, Lawler wrestled occasionally on WWF Superstars where he would take on jobbers while holding a microphone in the ring to, essentially, "do the commentary on (his) very own matches" while occasionally serving as the official cornerman for Isaac Yankem D.D.S. After a brief feud with Ultimate Warrior, Lawler began feuding with Jake Roberts after making fun of Roberts' real life drug and alcohol problems. The two met in a match at SummerSlam 1996, which Lawler won. After the match, Lawler poured Jim Beam whiskey down Roberts' throat.

Afterwards, he feuded with Mark Henry, which the two meet at In Your House 10: Mind Games which Henry won.

==== Part-time wrestling and commentator (1997–1998) ====
In early 1997, Lawler was involved in a working relationship between the WWF and Extreme Championship Wrestling (ECW). In June, Lawler entered the King of the Ring tournament for the first time and advanced to the semi-final round where he was defeated by Mankind. By the fall, the WWF introduced a new "light-heavyweight division" to compete with World Championship Wrestling (WCW)'s cruiserweight division. Lawler's son, Brian Christopher, was one of the major superstars in the division, although the WWF played up an angle where both Lawler and Christopher would deny their family relationship, even though the two would aid each other in matches and so on. USWA folded in November of that year.

By 1998, Lawler rarely wrestled in the WWF and focused on commentary. Despite their feud in the USWA in 1993, by 1998, Vince McMahon had turned heel in the WWF for the first time and left the announce position, to which Lawler began praising McMahon's name on commentary as part of his own heel persona, much to the chagrin of Jim Ross. It was McMahon's departure from the commentary team which led to the strong on-screen chemistry between Lawler and Ross in subsequent years. This played a key role in a change of Lawler's character; although he still supported the heels, he showed a sense of right and wrong, and would condemn actions of heels when they went too far.

==== Sporadic appearances, feud with Tazz, and departure (1999–2001) ====
Lawler during this period would continue commentating and rarely wrestled for the WWF. He wrestled between 1999 and 2001 mainly in house shows. On June 22, 2000, he made an appearance on SmackDown! teaming with The Kat to defeat Dean Malenko and Terri Runnels. This would be the first time in two years he wrestled on WWF television. A week later, he defeated Malenko on Raw.

He would turn face by 2000 (while wrestling). This began when Lawler surprisingly attacked Tazz when Tazz started bullying Jim Ross, thus beginning a feud with Tazz. At SummerSlam on August 27, Lawler wrestled Tazz in defense of Ross, and defeated him. At Unforgiven on September 24, he lost to Tazz in a Leather Strap match. Also, Lawler feuded with Tazz's partner Raven until January 2001.

With the creation of the XFL in 2001, Lawler was given the job as an announcer for the new football league. Lawler claims that he never wanted to announce for the XFL (he would admit on-air that he knew and cared almost nothing about the sport), but that he agreed to it after McMahon and Kevin Dunn asked him.

In February 2001, Lawler's then-wife Stacy "The Kat" Carter was involved in a storyline where Right to Censor (RTC), a group of wrestlers purportedly wanting to rein in the vulgarity of the "Attitude Era," during which she demanded equal time for the "right for nudity". RTC's leader Steven Richards offered a match with Lawler at No Way Out on February 25. If Lawler won, The Kat would get naked and if Richards won, The Kat would become RTC property. Richards won the match at No Way Out. The next night, Lawler teamed with the APA (Bradshaw and Faarooq) as they defeated Right to Censor members Bull Buchanan, The Goodfather and Val Venis on Raw is War. This would be Lawler's last WWF match.

After No Way Out, The Kat was released by the WWF and Lawler quit the company in protest.

=== Extreme Championship Wrestling (1997) ===
In 1997, Lawler became heavily involved in the working relationship between the WWF and Extreme Championship Wrestling (ECW). In interviews and commentary, he referred to the promotion as "Extremely Crappy Wrestling". His frequent insults toward ECW eventually led to the promotion "invading" Monday Night Raw in February 1997. He wrestled in two matches. The first on July 19 at Heat Wave 1997 in a steel cage match with Rob Van Dam and Sabu in a no contest against Rick Rude, The Sandman, and Tommy Dreamer. He wrestled against Dreamer at ECW's Hardcore Heaven pay-per-view in August, which Dreamer won.

=== Independent circuit (2001–2012) ===
During his absence from the WWF, Lawler made appearances on the independent circuit in both Australia and the States, as well as joining the fledgling Xcitement Wrestling Federation (XWF) promotion alongside WCW veteran Tony Schiavone as a color commentator. On October 26, 2001, he appeared on WWA The Inception as a commentator alongside Jeremy Borash, as well as wrestling in a battle royal. He also made appearances with the International Wrestling Cartel and with Maryland Championship Wrestling, where he held the promotion's world title after defeating The Bruiser on November 2. He would return to WWF after a nine-month absence.

On March 31, 2002, he reunited with his son, Brian, to defeat David Flair and Jim Cornette at the Tojo Yamamoto Memorial Show.

On November 8, 2003, in a match refereed by Mick Foley, Lawler defeated Al Snow for the JAPW Heavyweight Championship in Secaucus, New Jersey. He lost the title a month later to Dan Maff.

Also made appearances in Ohio Valley Wrestling, International Wrestling Cartel, and other promotions.

On November 11, 2005, he teamed with Brad Armstrong and Jeff Hardy to defeat The Midnight Express and Jim Cornette for CCW A Tribute for Starrcade.

On November 7, 2008, a tribute show was held for Lawler called Lawler 35 - A Tribute Fit For The King. it was held in Nashville. In the main event match, he defeated Sid Vicious.

On March 16, 2012, he defeated Tommy Dreamer at Wrestle War 2012.

=== Return to WWF/WWE (2001–present) ===
==== Commentator and part-time wrestler (2001–2012) ====
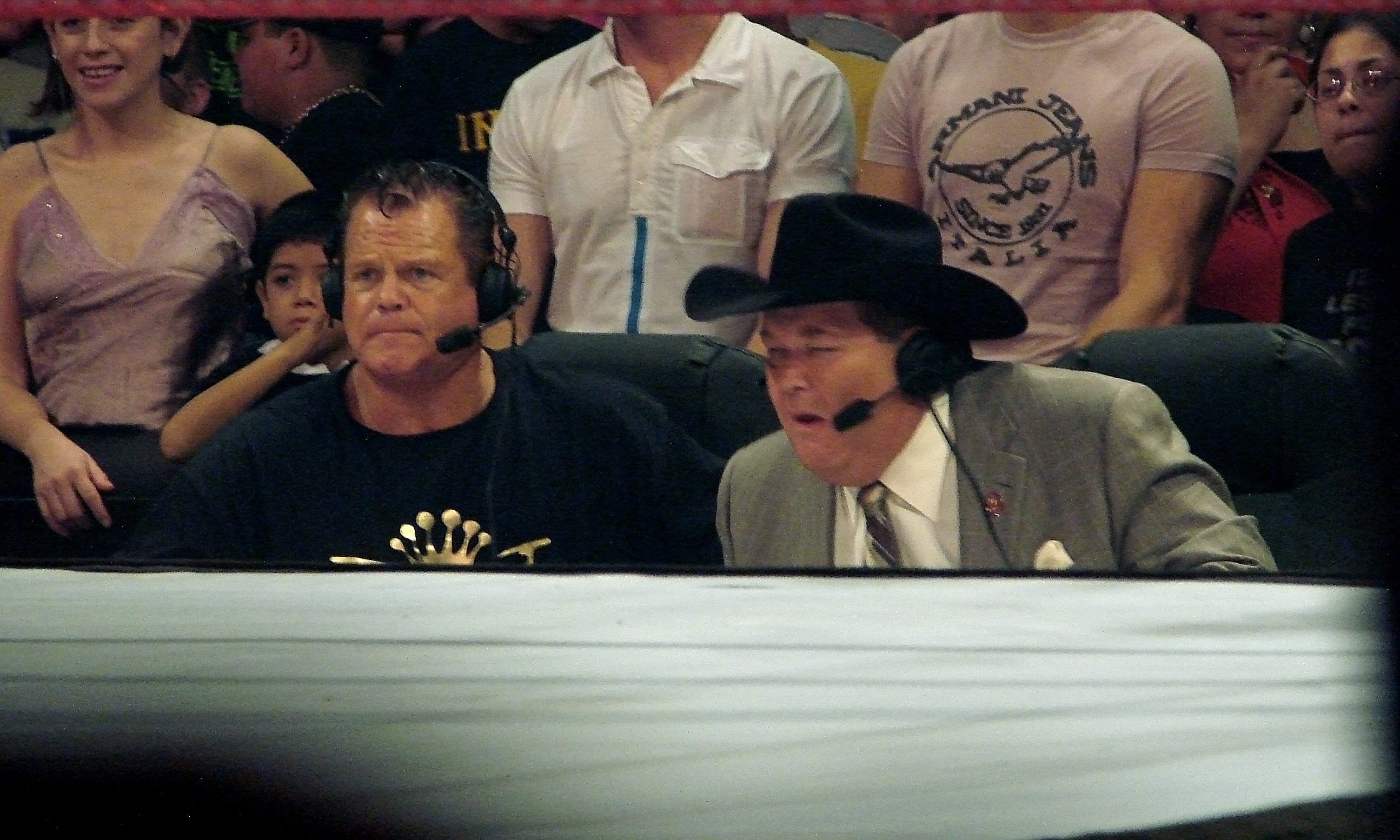
Lawler and Jim Ross calling the action for WWE

On November 19, 2001, after a nine-month hiatus from the company, Lawler returned to the WWF. He was reintroduced by Vince McMahon on Raw as the replacement for color commentator (and Alliance member) Paul Heyman, who had been (kayfabe) fired in the aftermath of the Alliance's loss at the previous night's Survivor Series. As he had been before his departure, Lawler once again became color commentator on Raw and pay-per-view events alongside Jim Ross and SmackDown! with Michael Cole, until the brands were separated and Lawler became exclusive to Raw. Lawler stated that his well-worked chemistry with Jim Ross has been a result of their different styles; according to Lawler, Jim Ross is a fine storyteller and keeps fans well-versed with current storylines, whereas he provides reaction and emotion to liven the commentary.

In 2003, Raw's announce team of Lawler and Jim Ross feuded with Sunday Night Heat's team of Jonathan Coachman and Al Snow. At Unforgiven, Lawler and Ross lost a match against Coachman and Snow, thus losing their right to do commentary on Raw. In a rematch, however, Ross defeated Coachman, winning Lawler and Ross their position back.

In 2006, Lawler faced Tazz at ECW One Night Stand, which Tazz won in only 30 seconds by making Lawler pass out to the Tazzmission.

In July 2006, Randy Orton began a feud with Hulk Hogan. Lawler attacked Orton in defense of Hogan, which set up a match between them on Raw. Orton defeated Lawler after a low blow and an RKO.

On March 31, 2007, Lawler was inducted into the WWE Hall of Fame by William Shatner, whom Lawler had a memorable altercation with on a January 1995 episode of Raw. In August, King Booker claimed to be the only one entitled to be known as "King". After being beaten by King Booker in the ring on the August 6 episode of Raw, Lawler was supposed to be forced to crown his opponent at a show of August 13 in Madison Square Garden. During the ceremony, however, Lawler announced another king as a new opponent for King Booker, "The King of Kings" Triple H. This led to a worked brawl between Lawler and King Booker.

On the July 7, 2008, episode of Raw, Lawler was attacked by Kane after saving Michael Cole from a similar attack, in which Kane repeatedly asked "Is he alive or is he dead?" Later that summer, he teamed with "Hacksaw" Jim Duggan to face Ted DiBiase and Cody Rhodes for the World Tag Team Championship but lost.

On the March 23, 2009, episode of Raw, Lawler challenged Chris Jericho to a match because of his disrespectful and erratic behavior to WWE Hall of Famers, which Jericho accepted. The following week, Lawler lost to Jericho after submitting to the Walls of Jericho. After the match, Jericho outlined how he would remain supreme against WWE Hall of Famers at WrestleMania 25.

On the July 20 episode of Raw, Lawler announced himself as the opponent against The Brian Kendrick. He went on to defeat Kendrick. On the November 16 episode of Raw, after recent acquisition Sheamus attacked the timekeeper in frustration for not receiving an opponent, Lawler left the announce table to confront Sheamus and check on the victim, only to receive a kick to the head for his troubles. On June 7, 2010, during a Viewer's Choice edition of Raw, Lawler lost his crown to IRS because he had apparently not paid his taxes, but it was regained by Quinton Jackson later on. At the end of the night, Lawler was one of the many employees at ringside that were brutally attacked by the season 1 NXT rookies. Lawler, however, was the only person at ringside that fought back, as he used punches and chops to attack the NXT rookies assaulting him until it was a 3-on-1 assault. The following week on Raw, Lawler and the Raw roster fought off the now-called "The Nexus" when they attempted to ambush John Cena a second time. On June 28, Lawler, Ricky Steamboat, Michael Hayes, Arn Anderson, Mike Rotunda and Dean Malenko were severely attacked by the Nexus, just as they were celebrating Steamboat's career. Josh Mathews replaced Lawler on color commentator for the remainder of the show.

On the July 26 episode of Raw, Lawler teamed with Mark Henry, Goldust, Yoshi Tatsu, Evan Bourne and The Hart Dynasty in a tag team elimination match versus the Nexus. Lawler was eliminated by Heath Slater.

On the November 29 King of the Ring Raw special, Lawler (who was celebrating his 61st birthday) challenged The Miz to a WWE Championship match. It was granted by the Anonymous Raw General Manager, who made it a Tables, Ladders, and Chairs match and it was Lawler's first shot at the title. The Miz retained the championship after interference by Cole and Alex Riley. Cole's interference caused tension between the two, but when Lawler threatened to attack Cole, the Anonymous Raw General Manager issued a "cease and desist" order, which barred any physicality between them.

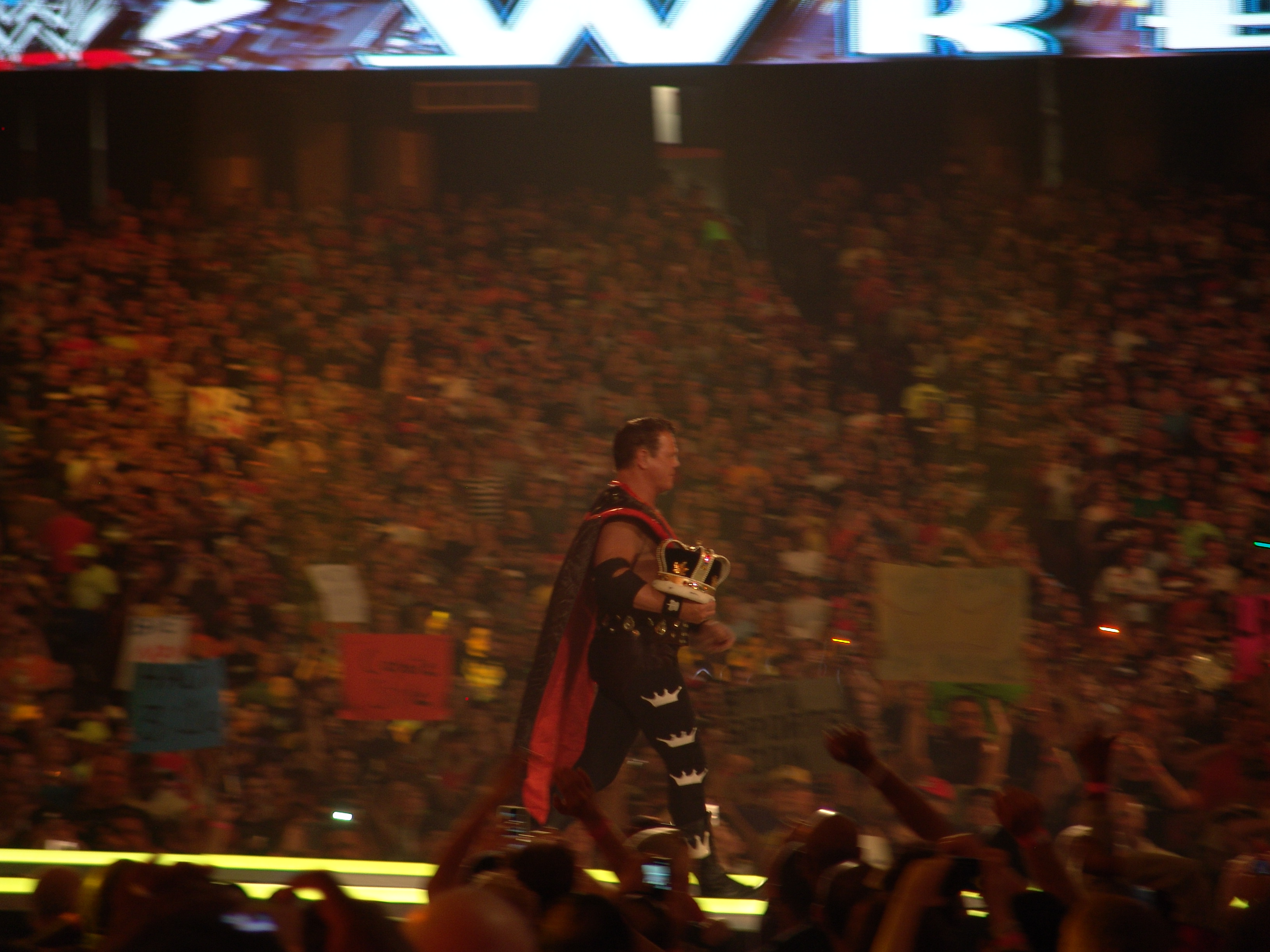
Lawler making his way to the ring at WrestleMania XXVII

Lawler continued to challenge with The Miz, where on the December 20 Raw, Lawler teamed with Randy Orton and John Morrison to take on The Miz, Riley and Sheamus in a 6-man tag match which Lawler won by pinning The Miz. This led to a rematch between The Miz and Lawler the following week, with Lawler once again getting the victory, this time by count-out after Morrison got involved. Lawler teamed with Orton again on the January 10, 2011 Raw, facing The Miz and Riley, which Lawler won by pinning Riley. Lawler won a 7-man Raw Rumble match on the January 31 Raw with help from John Cena to earn a WWE Championship match against The Miz at Elimination Chamber, where he was unsuccessful in winning the title, ending the feud.

The following night on Raw, Lawler, after having enough of Cole's attitude, which included the mocking of Lawler's mother's recent death, challenged him to a match at WrestleMania XXVII, which Cole accepted on the February 28 Raw and announced that he would be trained in the coming weeks by Jack Swagger for the upcoming match. Stone Cold Steve Austin was announced as the guest referee for the match the following week. On the March 14 Raw, Lawler was confronted by his son, Brian Lawler, who was invited to Raw to "expose" his father's character. Brian ranted about various problems he had with his father before slapping him and leaving. Cole continued to harass Lawler after Brian left, but was interrupted by a returning Jim Ross. Before Ross could attack Cole, Swagger attacked Lawler from behind and then proceeded to attack and lock in the ankle lock on Ross, while Cole harassed him. Lawler tried to stop the attack, but fell victim to the ankle lock as well.

At WrestleMania, Lawler initially won by submission, but the Anonymous Raw General Manager reversed the decision due to Stone Cold physically getting involved in the match by pushing Cole, making Cole the winner by disqualification. Lawler and Ross then faced Cole and Swagger at Extreme Rules in a Country Whipping match, where they were defeated. Lawler challenged Cole to one last match at Over the Limit, even going as far as to putting his Hall of Fame ring on the line and offered to personally induct Cole into the Hall of Fame itself. During the contract signing, Cole announced it would be a "Kiss My Foot" match. At the pay-per-view, Lawler defeated Cole. Afterwards, Ross, Eve Torres and Bret Hart helped Lawler by making Cole kiss his foot. Following the pay-per-view, Cole apologized to Lawler, ending the feud.

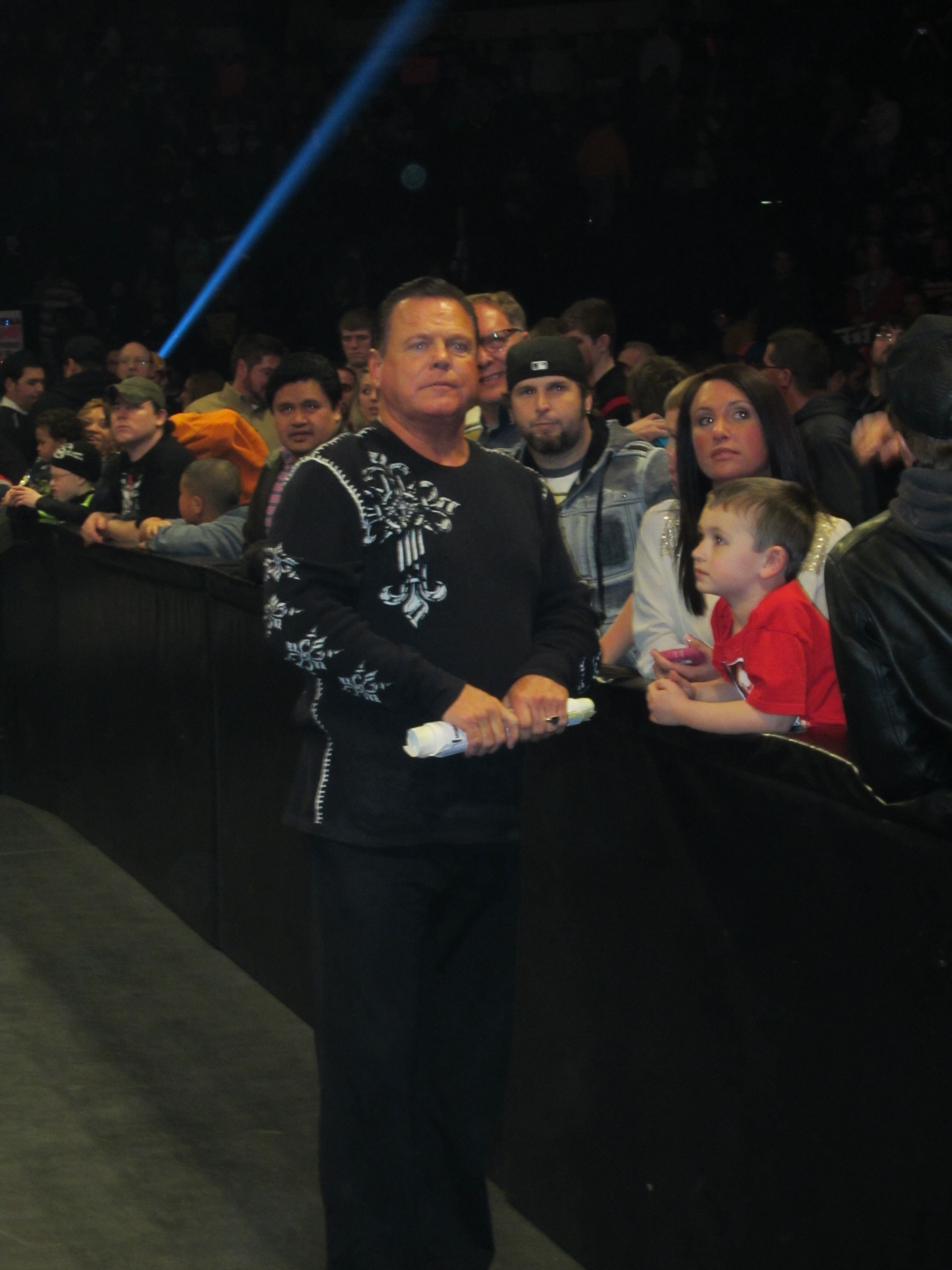
After his heart attack, Lawler returned to commentating.

Lawler competed in the 2012 Royal Rumble match as the number 12 entrant, but was eliminated by Cody Rhodes after 43 seconds. He, along with Booker T, eliminated Cole afterwards. On the April 30, 2012, episode of Raw, Lawler competed in a Beat the Clock challenge to determine the number one contender for the WWE Championship match at Over the Limit, but was defeated by Daniel Bryan, who went on to challenge for the title. On the July 9 episode of Raw, Lawler went against Cole in a WrestleMania XXVII rematch, which he quickly won, but the anonymous Raw General Manager, who returned that night as the guest general manager, reversed the decision and Lawler lost to Cole by disqualification following interference by Booker T. Santino Marella came out to reveal that Hornswoggle was the Anonymous Raw General Manager, who was hiding underneath the ring.

On the July 23 episode of WWE Raw 1000, after CM Punk attacked The Rock, Lawler would mention on commentary that "CM Punk has turned his back on the WWE Universe." The following week on Raw, Punk would confront Lawler about what he said before being interrupted by Big Show. On the August 20 episode of Raw, after Cena would not tell Punk he was the "Best in the World", Punk would ask for Lawler to get in the ring and say it for the WWE Universe. After Lawler refused to say Punk was the "Best in the World" too, Punk would attack Lawler from behind. The next week on Raw, after Lawler demanded an apology from Punk, Punk would challenge Lawler to a match, which Lawler would accept later that night, where Punk would defeat Lawler in a Steel Cage match. Before the September 3 episode of Raw, Punk and Lawler brawled backstage, with Punk getting the upper hand before officials stopped them, Lawler was kicked in the throat, which caused Lawler to miss commentary that night, with The Miz filling in for him.

==== Heart attack incident ====
On September 10, 2012, during Raw at the Bell Centre in Montreal, Quebec, not long after defeating Punk and Dolph Ziggler in a tag-team match with Randy Orton, Lawler legitimately collapsed at the announcers table while Kane and Daniel Bryan competed against Titus O'Neil and Darren Young. Cole continued to call that match alone, as well as the next match, before WWE (through Cole) announced the medical situation with Lawler. The remaining matches on the show went ahead as scheduled but without commentary and updates on Lawler's condition were provided by Cole. At the end of the broadcast, it was announced that he had received CPR, but was breathing independently and reacting to stimulation. Doctors said that Lawler was clinically dead for almost 30 minutes. It was later confirmed on WWE.com that Lawler had suffered a heart attack. On September 11, he underwent an angioplasty to improve blood flow to his heart. On September 12, Lawler was reported to be slowly being eased off sedation, his ventilator removed. He was able to blink, nod, and squeeze with his hands, and that same day, the results of several CT scans showed no signs of brain damage. By September 17, Lawler had returned to his home in Memphis. During Lawler's hospital stay, it was determined that his heart attack was not caused by a blocked artery, but was instead an unexplained cardiac arrest. Lawler was soon medically cleared to continue wrestling.

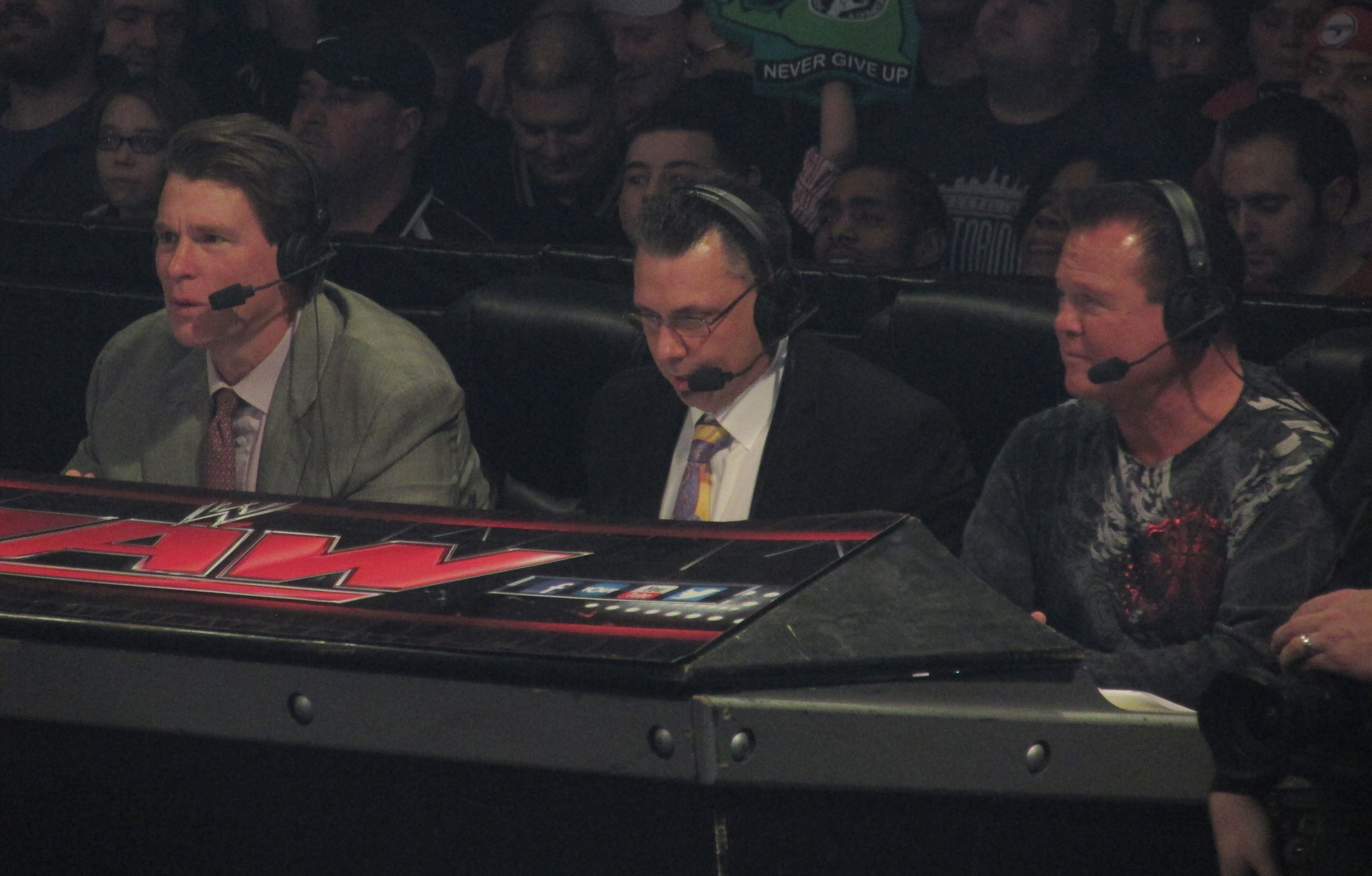
Lawler (right) commentating on Raw with John "Bradshaw" Layfield (left) and Michael Cole (center) in January 2014

It was announced on October 29 that Lawler would return to WWE on the November 12 episode of Raw. He continued his rivalry with Punk after his return was interrupted by Punk and Paul Heyman, who re-enacted his heart attack. Lawler continued to favor Punk's opponents, hoping that Punk would lose the WWE Championship, which he eventually did to The Rock at the Royal Rumble much to Lawler's delight.

==== SmackDown (2015–2016) ====
On January 8, 2015, it was announced on WWE.com that Lawler would be a part of the SmackDown broadcast team as a color commentator along with Cole and Byron Saxton starting January 15, ending his 19-year run as a color commentator of Raw as he was replaced by Booker T.

On the March 30 episode of Raw, however, Lawler made a one-night return to commentary with Saxton to fill in for Cole, Booker T and John "Bradshaw" Layfield (JBL) after they were assaulted by Brock Lesnar after Lesnar was refused his rematch against Seth Rollins. On June 17, 2016, Lawler was suspended following his arrest for domestic violence, with WWE stating they have "zero tolerance for matters involving domestic violence, and per our policy, Jerry Lawler was suspended indefinitely following his arrest", until July 1, when the charges were dropped and WWE lifted Lawler's suspension.

On July 7, 2016, Lawler returned to SmackDown resuming his commentary role. However, shortly afterwards, Lawler was taken off air and placed on the pre-show of both Raw and SmackDown as an analyst.

==== Sporadic appearances (2016–2019) ====
On December 5, 2016, it was announced that Lawler would no longer be used on pre-shows and instead be kept for special events such as the Hall of Fame ceremony.

On January 17, 2017, Lawler returned to SmackDown Live to host the return of The King's Court from his hometown of Memphis, Tennessee. During his interview with Dolph Ziggler, Ziggler took credit for Lawler's real life heart attack in September 2012 before and kicking him in the chest and leaving the ring. Later that night on Talking Smack, Renee Young announced that Lawler, Cole and Corey Graves will be the commentary team for the Royal Rumble match at the 2017 Royal Rumble. On August 28, Lawler filled in for Booker T on Raw commentary from his hometown of Memphis. Lawler, Ross and numerous other WWE Legends appeared on Raw 25 on January 22, 2018. On January 26, it was revealed that Lawler signed a new one-year deal with WWE. At the 2018 Royal Rumble, during the men's match, Lawler was the special guest commentator where he correctly predicted that Shinsuke Nakamura would win.

On March 21, 2018, Lawler suffered a stroke at his home in Memphis. He explained the incident on his podcast, which he revealed he could not speak for three days. He stayed in the hospital's ICU until he woke up three days later and regained his speech. The doctors said Lawler would make a full recovery. He was able to make all of his appearances during WrestleMania 34 weekend in New Orleans and was cleared to wrestle.

On April 8, 2018, at WrestleMania 34, Lawler called the fifth annual André the Giant Memorial Battle Royal on the WrestleMania 34 pre-show, alongside Ross and Saxton.

On April 27, 2018, Lawler served as part of the pre-show panel at the first WWE pay per view in Saudi Arabia called the Greatest Royal Rumble alongside Ross.

On the special SmackDown Live 1000th episode on October 16, 2018, Lawler returned as a guest commentator alongside Booker T to provide commentary for the New Day–The Bar match for the SmackDown Tag Team Championship.

Lawler returned as a guest commentator on the July 22, 2019, special episode of Raw called the Raw Reunion.

On the July 30, 2019, edition of SmackDown Live, Lawler returned to host the Kings Court with Trish Stratus as his guest.

Lawler returned on the August 19, 2019, edition of Raw to host the Kings Court and was attacked by "The Fiend" Bray Wyatt.

==== Return to full-time commentary (2019–2020) ====
On September 26, 2019, WWE announced as a part of their "WWE Premiere Week" that a new commentary team will be on Raw. Lawler would return to full-time commentary on Raw, as an analyst alongside Vic Joseph and Dio Maddin beginning on the September 30, 2019, edition of Raw. By January 2020, Lawler had outlasted both Joseph and Maddin, who were replaced by Tom Phillips and Byron Saxton, respectively. Lawler was replaced by Samoa Joe on the April 27, 2020, episode of Raw.

==== Sporadic appearances (2023–present) ====
Following his 2023 stroke recovery, Lawler appeared at Raw in Memphis, Tennessee on August 28, 2023, in a segment for the live audience, which was later uploaded to WWE's YouTube page as a digital exclusive. On the November 28, 2023, episode of NXT, he chose the participants that will compete in the Iron Survivor Challenge at NXT Deadline.

On May 6, 2024, it was reported that Lawler's broadcast contract with WWE expired at the beginning of 2024 and the company decided not to renew it. Lawler still remains under a Legends contract with WWE.

=== Proposed match with Hulk Hogan (2007–2008) ===
In 2007, it was announced that Lawler would be participating in a 'dream match' with Hulk Hogan which had been set to take place in the Memphis Wrestling promotion on April 27. The match had been heavily hyped by promoter Corey Maclin as Hogan had competed in the Memphis territory early in his career. On April 12, however, Lawler pulled out of the event citing his contractual obligations to WWE rendering him unable to appear on a show that was due to be filmed by VH1 for the television show Hogan Knows Best. On January 11, 2008, Maclin revealed that he filed a lawsuit against WWE, claiming that pressure on Lawler (and others) to withdraw from the event violated section two of the Sherman Antitrust Act.

== Other endeavors ==
Lawler has created some musical recordings. Among these are two late-1970s singles: "Cadillac Man/Memphis", and "Bad News". During his feud with manager Jimmy Hart (Lawler is a factor for "The Mouth of the South" Jimmy Hart entering professional wrestling; Lawler wanted to record a wrestling album with him singing, and since they had gone to school together, he called Hart and asked him to be a part of it) in the mid-1980s, Hart became known as "The Wimp", a nickname given to him by Lawler and chanted by fans. Hart was the subject of the song "Wimpbusters", which was sung by Lawler to the tune of the popular hit "Ghostbusters" by Ray Parker Jr.. A music video was also made, featuring Lawler, legendary announcer Lance Russell, and wrestlers such as Randy Savage, Jimmy Valiant, Dutch Mantel, Tommy Rich, and Rufus R. Jones, along with footage of "The King" beating Hart and his "First Family." A very young Brian Christopher also made an appearance as a young child being bullied, and another child is seen wearing a replica of Tully Blanchard's West Texas State jersey. He also recorded a CD titled Memphis' Other King.

Lawler had his own talk show called "The Jerry Lawler Show" on WMC-TV in Memphis during the 1980s.

In 1998, Lawler appeared in the film Man on the Moon, starring Jim Carrey. According to Lawler's autobiography, It's Good To Be The King... Sometimes, an incident involving Jim Carrey forgetting a line led to animosity between the two actors during filming. Between scenes Jim Carrey often remained in character as Andy Kaufman and at one point spit on Jerry, just as Kaufman had done in 1982. A 'stunned' Lawler reacted by grabbing Carrey by the hair and locked him in a sleeper hold and jerking his neck— sending Carrey to the hospital.

In 1999, Lawler ran for mayor of Memphis, Tennessee. His platform focused on making the streets safer for residents, beautifying the city, and improving the quality of education. In addition, he vowed to attract businesses to Memphis, improve the flow of traffic, create more parks, and decrease property taxes. Lawler ended up with 11.7% of ballots, beating twelve of the fifteen candidates. Ultimately, however, Mayor Willie Herenton was easily reelected.

In 2000, Lawler made a very brief cameo appearance in the music video of "I Can't Lie To Me" By Clay Davidson. On December 17, 2002; he released his autobiography titled It's Good To Be The King... Sometimes. On July 8, 2009, Lawler again ran for the position of Mayor of Memphis in a special mayoral election; on October 15, 2009. He was in 5th with 4% of the vote.

Lawler is also a commercial artist, designing graphics for various companies, including WWE. In 2007, he painted the cover of the wrestling comic book Headlocked.

In 2012, he played the role of Sheriff Jackson Cole in the horror comedy film Girls Gone Dead.

Lawler has provided his voice for numerous WWE video games in which he has appeared as a commentator. He also features as a playable character in WWE 2K20, WWE 2K22, WWE 2K23, and WWE 2K24. Additionally, he is playable in WWE All Stars and WWE '12 as a downloadable character.

In 2016, Lawler and business partner Barry Aycock opened a wrestling-themed establishment King Jerry Lawler's Hall of Fame Bar & Grille on Beale Street, Downtown Memphis, Tennessee. The next year Lawler opened King Jerry Lawler's Memphis BBQ Co. in Cordova, Tennessee.

In March 2017, Lawler launched the wrestling and pop-culture podcast Dinner with the King. His co-host is Glenn Moore and the podcast is produced by Pod Avenue. The podcast ceased production after Moore was accused of scamming Lawler fans who tried to buy merchandise and artwork from Lawler. Lawler and new co-host Scott Reedy started a new podcast called The Jerry Lawler Show in 2019 and ran until 2020.

== Personal life ==
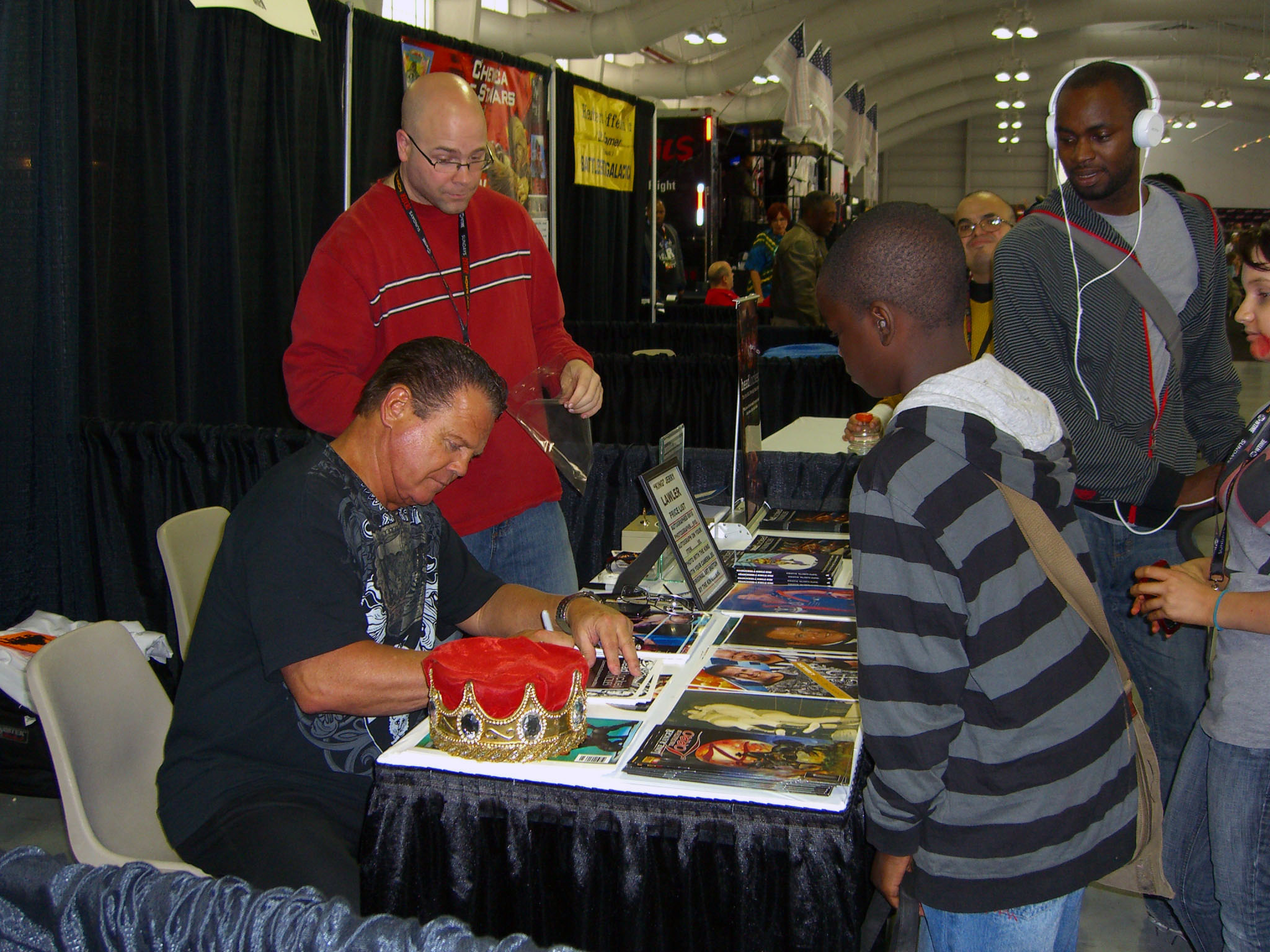
Lawler signing autographs for fans at the New York Comic Con in Manhattan, October 16, 2011

Lawler is the cousin of fellow professional wrestler The Honky Tonk Man. Lawler has been married three times and had two sons with his first wife, Kay. He also has a daughter named Heather. His son Brian, who wrestled in WWF/E under the names "Brian Christopher" and "Grandmaster Sexay," died by suicide on July 29, 2018. His other son, Kevin, has been in professional wrestling as both a referee and wrestler under the names "Kevin Christian" and "Freddie Gilbert," the latter of which was used during a stint as the "brother" of Eddie Gilbert. In his book, It's Good To Be The King ... Sometimes, Lawler says he believes Kevin's short physical stature has prevented him from reaching success similar to Brian. In August 2008, Kevin was arrested on charges of trespassing and aggravated burglary. After divorcing Kay, Lawler was later married to Paula from February 14, 1982, to October 2, 1991.

He met his third wife, Stacy "The Kat" Carter, at a charity softball game in Memphis, Tennessee, on July 23, 1989. They married in September 2000. In mid-February 2001, Carter (who was a valet and has also made in-ring appearances) was released by the World Wrestling Federation. Lawler then left the company in protest. Carter and Lawler later separated shortly before Lawler rejoined the WWF in November 2001. Their divorce was finalized on October 15, 2003.

Though he has spent most of his life in Memphis, Lawler did spend a part of his childhood in Ohio after his father was transferred to a Ford Motor Company assembly plant in Lorain, Ohio. From the ages of 7 to 15 his family resided in the city of Amherst, Ohio, a suburb near Cleveland. Although this stay was brief, it would have an influence on Lawler throughout his life thereafter. He often cites Cleveland as his second-favorite city behind only Memphis and is a die-hard fan of the Cleveland Guardians, the Cleveland Browns, and the Cleveland Cavaliers. When WWE performs in Cleveland, Lawler will usually wear a Browns jersey or an Indians jersey (at SummerSlam 1996 he teased Browns fans by wearing a Baltimore Ravens jersey, because the original Browns moved to Baltimore and became the Ravens), and during baseball season, he would throw out the first pitch at a game.

Lawler is a collector of Coca-Cola and Superman merchandise, and owns a replica of the Batmobile from the 1960s Batman series.

In late 1993, Lawler was indicted in Jefferson County, Kentucky, on charges of statutory rape and sodomy of a 13-year-old girl. Lawler later made a plea for a lesser charge after witnesses refused to testify. Lawler then returned to work for the World Wrestling Federation.

Lawler's son Brian was found hanging in the Hardeman County Jail on July 29, 2018, and was pronounced dead later that day. On the one-year anniversary of his death, Lawler filed a wrongful death lawsuit against Hardeman County, Hardeman County Sheriff John Doolen and others for allegedly failing to protect him. He alleged that Doolen had personally promised to "keep an eye" on Brian after he was incarcerated. The case was dismissed on September 20, 2024.

On February 7, 2023, Lawler was rushed to the hospital after suffering a stroke at his Florida home. Lawler had previously suffered a stroke in 2018.

Lawler was scheduled to appear at HorrorHound Weekend in Cincinnati on Friday, September 5, 2025; however, on September 10, it was reported that "due to some personal matters" he had to cancel. The following day on September 11, TMZ reported that Lawler cancelled due to suffering his third stroke since 2018 at one of his homes in Florida on that Friday and was hospitalized. Lawler's daughter confirmed that her father was on the road to recovery and that she was taking Lawler back to his primary residence in Memphis where he will rest up for a few more weeks before getting back to normal. According to Lawler's caregiver, his 2023 stroke impacted the left side of his body while his 2025 stroke impacted the right side of the body and left him color blind.

In August 2026, a street named after Lawler was dedicated to him in his home town of Memphis, Tennessee.

== Championships and accomplishments ==
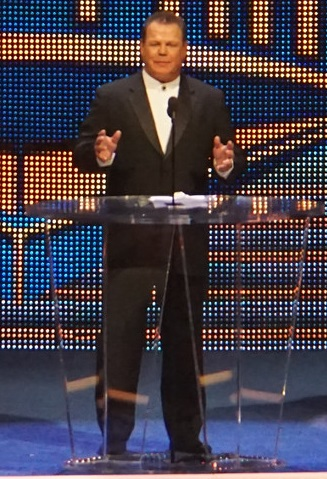
Lawler was inducted into the WWE Hall of Fame in 2007.

- American Wrestling Association
  - AWA Southern Heavyweight Championship (57 times)
  - AWA Southern Tag Team Championship (10 times) – with Jimmy Valiant (1), Bill Dundee (3), Mongolian Stomper (1), Jos LeDuc (1), Austin Idol (1), Plowboy Frazier (1), and Big Bubba (1)
  - AWA World Heavyweight Championship (1 time) (Note: These title changes took place during an AWA hosted card as part of an interpromotional relationship between the American Wrestling Association, World Class Wrestling Association, and Continental Wrestling Association. Lawler also won the championship during a CWA hosted card.)
  - AWA World Tag Team Championship (2 times) – with Bill Dundee
- Cauliflower Alley Club
  - President's Award (2022)
- Championship Wrestling of Arkansas
  - CWA Arkansas Heavyweight Championship (1 time, final)
- Championship Wrestling from Florida
  - NWA Brass Knuckles Championship (Florida version) (1 time)
- Continental Wrestling Association / Championship Wrestling Association
  - CWA World Heavyweight Championship (1 time)
  - CWA International Heavyweight Championship (3 times)
  - CWA Lord of the Ring (1988)
  - CWA Heavyweight Championship (1 time)
  - CWA World Tag Team Championship (2 times) – with Austin Idol (1) and Tommy Rich (1)
  - NWA Mid-America Heavyweight Championship (3 times)
  - NWA Southern Heavyweight Championship (Memphis version) (7 times)
  - 10,000 Dollar Tag Team Tournament- with Jimmy Valiant
- Georgia Championship Wrestling
  - NWA Macon Tag Team Championship (2 times) – with Mr. Wrestling II (1) and Don Greene (1)
- NWA Gulf Coast Championship Wrestling
  - NWA Tennessee Tag Team Championship (1 time) – with Jim White
- Indiana Sports Hall of Fame
  - Class of 2023
- International Wrestling Association
  - IWA Heavyweight Championship (1 time)
- Jersey All Pro Wrestling
  - JAPW Heavyweight Championship (1 time)
- Maryland Championship Wrestling
  - MCW Heavyweight Championship (1 time)
  - MCW Tag Team Championship (1 time) – with The Bruiser
- Memphis Championship Wrestling
  - MCW Southern Heavyweight Championship (2 times)
- Memphis Wrestling
  - Memphis Wrestling Southern Heavyweight Championship (2 times)
  - Memphis Wrestling Television Championship (1 time)
- Memphis Wrestling Hall of Fame
  - Class of 2017
- Northeast Wrestling
  - NEW Tag Team Championship (1 time) - with Keith Youngblood
- NWA Mid-America
  - NWA Southern Heavyweight Championship (Mid-America version) (10 times)
  - NWA Southern Tag Team Championship (Mid-America version) (9 times) – with Jim White (7), Plowboy Frazier (1), and Bill Dundee (1)
  - NWA Southern Junior Heavyweight Championship (5 times)
  - NWA Tri-State Heavyweight Championship (Alabama version) (1 time)
  - NWA Tri-State Tag Team Championship (Alabama version) (2 times) – with Steve Lawler
  - NWA United States Tag Team Championship (Mid-America version) (1 time) – with Jackie Fargo (1)
  - NWA Southern States Heavyweight Championship Tournament (1975)
- NWA Polynesian Wrestling
  - NWA Polynesian Pacific Heavyweight Championship (1 time)
- NWA Virginia
  - NWA All-Star Heavyweight Championship (1 time)
- Power Pro Wrestling
  - PPW Tag Team Championship (1 time) – with Bill Dundee
- Pro Wrestling Illustrated
  - Feud of the Year (1992) with Jeff Jarrett vs. The Moondogs
  - Feud of the Year (1993) vs. Bret Hart
  - Most Hated Wrestler of the Year (1993, 1995)
  - Most Inspirational Wrestler of the Year (1988, 2012)
  - Ranked No. 7 of the 500 top singles wrestlers in the PWI 500 in 1992
  - Ranked No. 23 of the 500 top singles wrestlers in the PWI Years in 2003
  - Ranked No. 56 of the 100 top tag teams of the PWI Years with Bill Dundee in 2003
- Pro Wrestling This Week
  - Wrestler of the Week (December 6–12, 1987)
- Professional Wrestling Hall of Fame and Museum
  - Class of 2011
- Smoky Mountain Wrestling
  - SMW Heavyweight Championship (2 times)
- Traditional Championship Wrestling
  - TCW Tag Team Championship (1 time) – with Matt Riviera
- United States Wrestling Association
  - USWA Heavyweight Championship (2 times)
  - USWA Texas Heavyweight Championship (1 time)
  - USWA Unified World Heavyweight Championship (28 times)
  - USWA World Tag Team Championship (6 times ) – with Jeff Jarrett (4) and Bill Dundee (2)
  - USWA World Heavyweight Title Number One Seed Round Robin Tournament (1990)
  - USWA World Heavyweight Championship Tournament (1990)
  - USWA World Heavyweight Championship #1 Contender's Tournament (1993)
- Windy City Pro Wrestling
  - WCPW Battle Royal Championship (1 time)
- World Class Wrestling Association
  - WCWA World Heavyweight Championship (3 time)
  - WCWA Texas Heavyweight Championship (1 time)
- World Wrestling Council
  - Caribbean Cup (2014)
- World Wrestling Federation / World Wrestling Entertainment / WWE
  - Raw Rumble (2011)
  - WWE Hall of Fame (Class of 2007)
  - Slammy Award (5 times)
    - Mouthiest (1994)
    - I'm Talking and I Can't Shut Up (1996)
    - Most Embarrassing Moment (1995) – Kissing his own foot
    - WWE.com Exclusive Video of the Year (2012) – Speaking to WWE.com about his miraculous return
    - Comeback of the Year (2012)
- Wrestling Observer Newsletter
  - Best Color Commentator (1997, 1996)
  - Feud of the Year (1987) vs. Austin Idol and Tommy Rich
  - Feud of the Year (1992) with Jeff Jarrett vs. The Moondogs
  - Feud of the Year (1993) vs. Bret Hart
  - Worst Feud of the Year (1994) vs. Doink the Clown
  - Worst Television Announcer (2002)
  - Worst Worked Match of the Year (1994) with Sleazy, Queasy and Cheesy vs. Clowns R' Us at Survivor Series
  - Wrestling Observer Newsletter Hall of Fame (Class of 1996)
- Xcitement Wrestling Federation
  - XWF World Heavweight Championship (1 time)
- USA Championship Wrestling
  - USACW United States Championship (1 time)

== Luchas de Apuestas record ==
Winner (wager)	Loser (wager)	Location	Event	Date	Notes
Jerry Lawler (hair)	Inferno (mask)	Nashville, Tennessee	GWE Nashville	June 5, 1974	
Jerry Lawler (hair)	The Mummy (mask)	Memphis, Tennessee	GWE Memphis	December 2, 1974	
Jerry Lawler (hair)	Bill Dundee (hair)	Memphis, Tennessee	GWE Memphis	September 5, 1977	
Jerry Lawler (hair)	John Louie (hair)	Memphis, Tennessee	CWA Memphis	April 24, 1978	
Bill Dundee (hair)	Jerry Lawler (championship)	Memphis, Tennessee	CWA Live event	October 1, 1979	
Jerry Lawler (hair)	Tom Branch (hair)	Memphis, Tennessee	CWA Memphis	November 11, 1985	
Jerry Lawler (hair)	Big Bubba (hair)	Memphis, Tennessee	CWA Memphis	November 23, 1986	
Austin Idol (hair)	Jerry Lawler (hair and championship)	Memphis, Tennessee	CWA show	April 27, 1987	
Jerry Lawler (hair)	Don Bass (hair)	Memphis, Tennessee	CWA Memphis	August 31, 1987	
Jerry Lawler (hair)	Christmas Creature (mask)	Memphis, Tennessee	USWA Memphis	December 28, 1992	
