= NWA Columbus Heavyweight Championship =

Professional wrestling competition

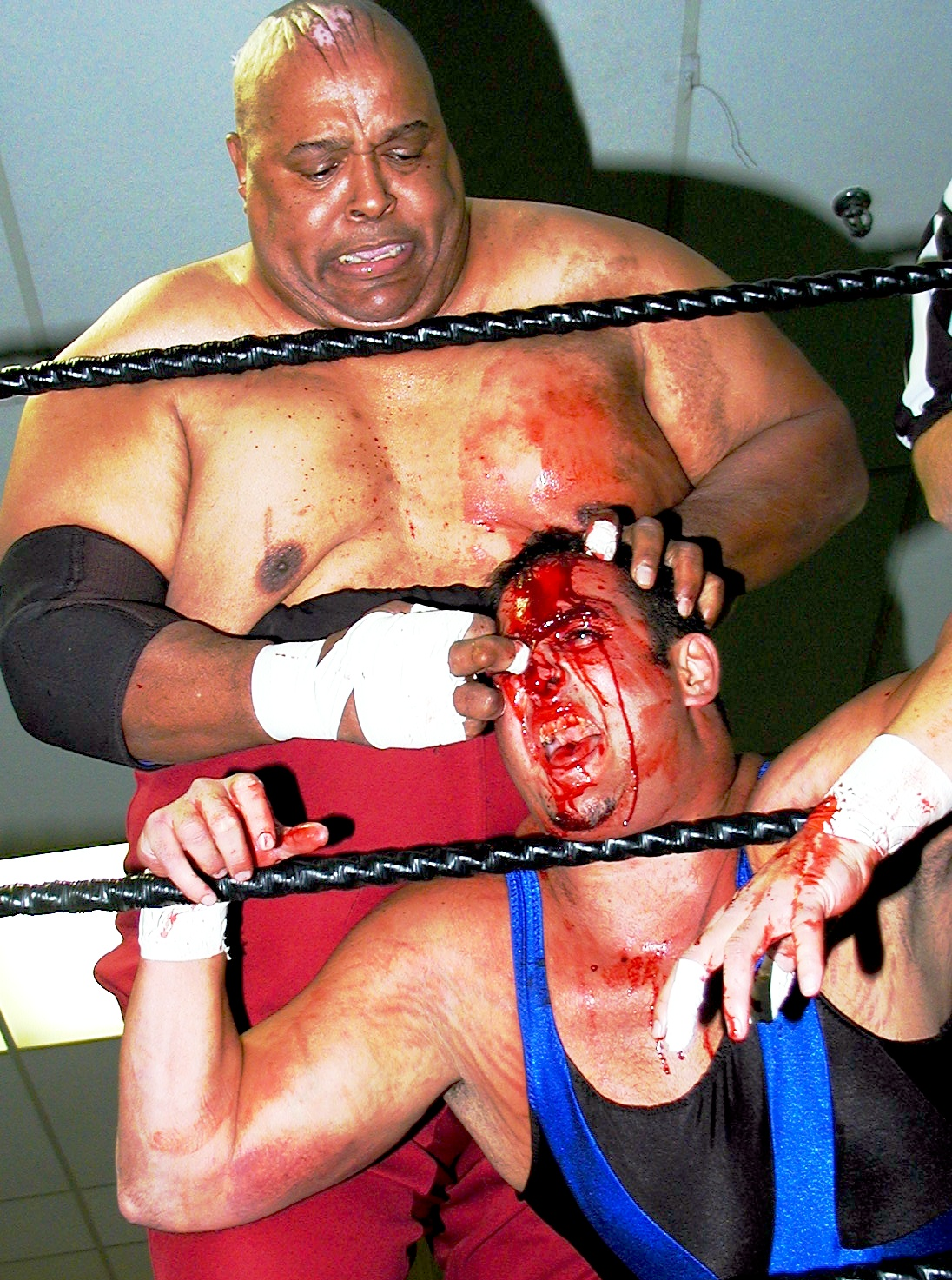
- Abdullah the Butcher is a former NWA Columbus Heavyweight Champion.

Details
- Promotion: Georgia Championship Wrestling
- Date established: July 22, 1970
- Date retired: 1979
Statistics
- First champion: Assassin #2
- Final champion: King Kong Mosca
- Most reigns: Bob Armstrong (4)
- Longest reign: Bob Armstrong (131 days)
- Shortest reign: Hiro Matsuda (21 days)

The NWA Columbus Heavyweight Championship was a professional wrestling regional championship in Georgia Championship Wrestling (GCW). It was a minor title, complementing the NWA Columbus Tag Team Championship, and defended almost exclusively at the Columbus Municipal Auditorium throughout the 1970s.

The Columbus titles were one of two sets of GCW's city-wide championships, along with the NWA Macon Heavyweight Championship and NWA Macon Tag Team Championship, and one of a select few city championships recognized by the National Wrestling Alliance. The final champion was Angelo Mosca and the title was eventually abandoned after 1979.

There have been a total of 11 recognized champions who have had a combined 18 official reigns, with "Bullet" Bob Armstrong holding the most at four. At 131 days, Armstrong's second reign was the longest in the title's history. The shortest reigning champion was Hiro Matsuda, whose first and only reign lasted 21 days.

Key
No.	Overall reign number
Reign	Reign number for the specific champion
Days	Number of days held

No.	Champion	Championship change			Reign statistics		Notes	Ref.
No.	Champion	Date	Event	Location	Reign	Days	Notes	Ref.
1	Assassin #2	July, 1971 (NLT)	GCW show	N/A	1	(Note: The exact date on which the title was lost is not known, which means their title reign lasted between 77 and 97 days.)		
2	Bill Dromo	October 6, 1971	GCW show	Columbus, GA	1	(Note: The exact date on which the title was lost is not known, which means their title reign lasted between 119 and 335 days.)		
Championship history is unrecorded from October 6, 1971 to September 6, 1972.
3	Bob Armstrong	September 6, 1972	GCW show	Columbus, GA	1	126		
4	Hiro Matsuda	January 10, 1973	GCW show	Columbus, GA	1	21		
5	Bob Armstrong	January 31, 1973	GCW show	Columbus, GA	2	131		
6	Bobby Duncum	June 11, 1973	GCW show	Columbus, GA	1			
7	Bill Dromo	1973	GCW show	N/A	2			
8	Bobby Duncum	August 8, 1973	GCW show	Columbus, GA	2	14		
9	Mr. Wrestling II	August 22, 1973	GCW show	Columbus, GA	1	(Note: The exact date on which the title was lost is not known, which means their title reign lasted between 14 and 98 days.)		
10	Gorgeous George Jr.	November, 1973 (NLT)	GCW show	N/A	1			
Championship history is unrecorded from November, 1973 (NLT) to January, 1974 (NLT).
11	Bob Armstrong	January, 1974 (NLT)	GCW show	N/A	3			
Championship history is unrecorded from January, 1974 (NLT) to April, 1974 (NLT).
12	Bob Armstrong	April, 1974 (NLT)	GCW show	N/A	4			
Championship history is unrecorded from April, 1974 (NLT) to 1975.
—	Vacated	1975	—	—	—	—	Championship vacated for unknown reasons.	
Championship history is unrecorded from 1975 to February, 1977 (NLT).
13	Mr. Wrestling II	February, 1977 (NLT)	GCW show	N/A	2			
Championship history is unrecorded from February, 1977 (NLT) to January, 1978 (NLT).
14	Mr. Wrestling II	January, 1978 (NLT)	GCW show	N/A	3	102		
15	Abdullah the Butcher	April 30, 1978	GCW show	Columbus, GA	1	49		
16	Stan Hansen	June 18, 1978	GCW show	Columbus, GA	1			
Championship history is unrecorded from June 18, 1978 to November 29, 1978.
17	Ole Anderson	November 29, 1978	GCW show	Columbus, GA	1		Defeated Mr. Wrestling II.	
Championship history is unrecorded from November 29, 1978 to January, 1979 (NLT).
18	King Kong Mosca	January, 1979 (NLT)	GCW show	N/A	1			

List of top combined reigns

¤	The exact length of several title reigns are uncertain, so the shortest possible length is used.

List of combined reigns
Rank	Champion	No. of reigns	Combined days
1	Bob Armstrong	4	257¤
2	Mr. Wrestling II	3	173¤
3	Bill Dromo	2	119¤
4	Assassin #2	1	77¤
5	Abdullah the Butcher	1	49
6	Hiro Matsuda	1	21
7	Bobby Duncum	2	16¤
8	Gorgeous George Jr.	1	N/A
9	Stan Hansen	1	N/A
10	Ole Anderson	1	N/A
11	King Kong Mosca	1	N/A
