= Minnesota Wrecking Crew (professional wrestling) =

Professional wrestling tag team

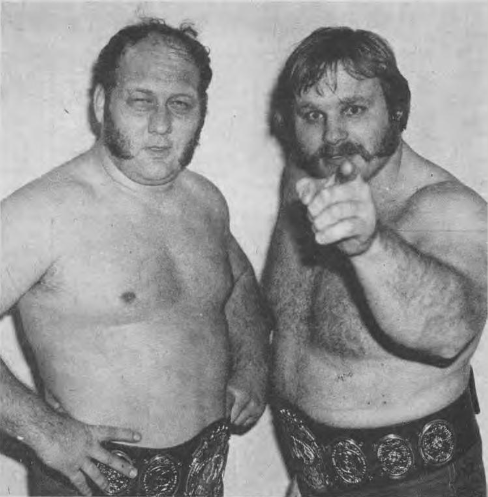
- Gene (left) and Ole Anderson as tag team champions, c. 1982

Tag team
- Members: Gene Anderson; Lars Anderson; Ole Anderson; Arn Anderson
- Name(s): Andersons; Minnesota Wrecking Crew
- Billed heights: Gene: 6 ft 0 in (1.83 m); Lars: 6 ft 1 in (1.85 m); Ole: 6 ft 1 in (1.85 m); Arn: 6 ft 1 in (1.85 m)
- Billed from: Minnesota
- Debut: 1966
- Disbanded: 1990
- Years active: 1966-1990

The Minnesota Wrecking Crew, also known simply as the Andersons, was originally a professional wrestling tag team who was formed by Gene and Lars Anderson, but since then has comprised a number of wrestlers. All members wrestled were presented as members of the Anderson family despite not being blood related.

== History ==
Gene Anderson formed the original Minnesota Wrecking Crew with his kayfabe brother Lars Anderson in 1966. They wrestled throughout the country in the late 60s until Lars left to live in Hawaii. In 1969 Gene then brought in Alan Rogowski, and renamed him Ole Anderson. They dominated tag team wrestling in the 1970s, winning the NWA World Tag Team Titles 8 times. Over those years, Lars Anderson was on occasion brought back in as part of this team.

A young Ric Flair was promoted in the mid 1970s as being the cousin of the Andersons who fell out with them resulting in a family feud over the NWA World Tag Team Championship - with Flair enlisting Greg Valentine as his partner - throughout the late 1970s.

When Gene stopped wrestling in 1981 to manage, the team was disbanded.

In 1985, Ole reformed the Crew with Arn Anderson (his kayfabe nephew) as his partner. They won the NWA National Tag Team Titles and were members of the original Four Horsemen as the Wrecking Crew, reuniting with their kayfabe cousin Flair. They disbanded in 1987 when Ole was kicked out of the Horsemen.

Arn and Ole revived the Wrecking Crew in 1990, yet again in alliance with Flair as Horsemen, but it lasted for only a few months before Ole retired.

Also in 1990, Ole managed the Minnesota Wrecking Crew 2 in NWA while Arn was out injured. This team consisted of Mike Enos and Wayne Bloom. Both members were from Minnesota and wore masks. The two men were the then-current AWA World Tag Team Champions, but were beaten by NWA World Tag Team Champions Rick and Scott Steiner in the NWA.

=== Legacy ===
In 2001 in Ohio Valley Wrestling, Brock Lesnar and Shelton Benjamin (once teammates on the University of Minnesota wrestling team) formed the Minnesota Stretching Crew in honor of the Wrecking Crew with their trunks university colors maroon and yellow. More recently, independent women wrestlers Lacey and Rain have used the name Minnesota Home Wrecking Crew in homage to the Andersons' classic tag team.

The Canadian sketch comedy troupe The Minnesota Wrecking Crew are also named in honor of the original MWC tag team.

== Championships and accomplishments ==
- National Wrestling Alliance

- NWA Hall of Fame (class of 2010)

=== Lars and Gene ===
- Mid-South Sports

- NWA Georgia Tag Team Championship (2 times)
- NWA World Tag Team Championship (Georgia version) (1 time)

=== Gene and Ole ===
- Georgia Championship Wrestling

- NWA Columbus Tag Team Championship (11 times)
- NWA Georgia Tag Team Championship (7 times)
- NWA Macon Tag Team Championship (1 time)
- NWA World Tag Team Championship (Georgia version) (1 times)

- Mid-Atlantic Championship Wrestling

- NWA Atlantic Coast Tag Team Championship (3 times)
- NWA Mid-Atlantic Tag Team Championship (6 times)
- NWA World Tag Team Championship (Mid-Atlantic version) (7 times)

- Pro Wrestling Illustrated

- Tag Team of the Year (1975, 1977)

=== Ole and Arn ===
- Jim Crockett Promotions

- NWA National Tag Team Championship (1 time)

- Pro Wrestling Illustrated

- Ranked Ole and Arn Anderson No. 79 of the best 100 tag teams during the PWI Years in 2003

== See also ==
- The Brain Busters
- The Enforcers
