= Gene Anderson (wrestler) =

American professional wrestler and manager

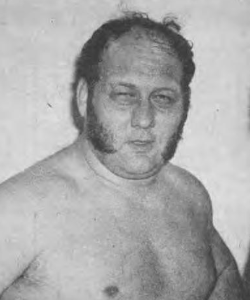
- Anderson, c. 1982

Personal information
- Born: Eugene Avon Anderson; October 4, 1939 Saint Paul, Minnesota, U.S.
- Died: October 31, 1991 (aged 52) Huntersville, North Carolina, U.S.
- Cause of death: Heart attack
- Education: North Dakota State College of Science
- Spouse: Edith Simpson
- Children: 3, including Brad Anderson

Professional wrestling career
- Ring name: Gene Anderson
- Billed height: 6 ft 0 in (183 cm)
- Billed weight: 251 lb (114 kg)
- Trained by: Verne Gagne
- Debut: 1958
- Retired: 1985

Eugene Avon Anderson (October 4, 1939 – October 31, 1991) was an American professional wrestler and professional wrestling manager. He is best known for being one-half of the tag team the Minnesota Wrecking Crew, first with Lars Anderson, then with Ole Anderson.

He was a marquee performer for the National Wrestling Alliance (NWA) from the late-1960s, appearing with promotions including the American Wrestling Association (AWA), Georgia Championship Wrestling (GCW) and Mid-Atlantic Championship Wrestling (MACW). The Minnesota Wrecking Crew were named "Tag Team of the Year" by Pro Wrestling Illustrated in 1975 and 1977.

== Early life ==
Anderson was born in Saint Paul, Minnesota to Royal Anderson and Pauline Sergeant. He competed in amateur wrestling while attending South Saint Paul Secondary, becoming a state champion. He attended North Dakota State College of Science.

== Professional wrestling career ==
=== Early career (1958–1961) ===
Anderson was trained by Verne Gagne, making his debut in 1958. He spent several years wrestling in Calgary, Alberta, Canada for Stampede Wrestling.

=== American Wrestling Association (1961–1966) ===
Anderson joined the Minneapolis, Minnesota–based American Wrestling Association (AWA) in 1961. In 1965, he formed the tag team The Minnesota Wrecking Crew with Lars Anderson, who was billed as his brother.

=== Georgia Championship Wrestling (1963, 1966-1967, 1973–1981, 1984) ===
Anderson made his first appearance with the Atlanta, Georgia-based promotion Georgia Championship Wrestling (GCW) in 1963. In 1967, he and Lars Anderson held the NWA Southern Tag Team Championship (Georgia version) on two occasions. The duo also won the NWA World Tag Team Championship (Georgia version) in April 1967, vacating the championship later that year. Anderson resumed wrestling for Georgia Championship Wrestling (GCW) in the mid-1970s, this time with Ole Anderson as his partner. The duo held both the NWA Macon Tag Team Championship and the NWA Southeastern Tag Team Championship (Georgia version) on one occasion in 1974, and the NWA Georgia Tag Team Championship on seven occasions between 1974 and 1977.

=== Mid-Atlantic Championship Wrestling (1966–1985) ===
In 1966, Anderson (along with Lars) began regularly wrestling for the Charlotte, North Carolina–based promotion Mid-Atlantic Championship Wrestling (MACW). After Lars relocated to Hawaii in 1969, Anderson reformed the tag team with Ole Anderson, who was also billed as his brother. Between 1970 and 1975, he and Ole Anderson won the NWA Atlantic Coast Tag Team Championship (renamed the NWA Mid-Atlantic Tag Team Championship in 1973) on six occasions. On January 29, 1975, the duo were crowned the inaugural NWA World Tag Team Champions (Mid-Atlantic version). They went on to hold the championship on six further occasions. The duo's final reign ended when they forfeited the championship in December 1981 after Anderson sustained an injury. In 1979, Anderson took control of Buddy Rogers' stable of wrestlers, naming it "Anderson's Army". Between 1979 and 1981, Anderson managed wrestlers including The Iron Sheik, Jimmy Snuka, Ray Stevens, The Masked Superstar, and Ivan Koloff. The stable was disbanded when Anderson reformed The Minnesota Wrecking Crew with Ole Anderson. In October 1981, Anderson received a stiff baseball bat blow to the back of his head from Wahoo McDaniel, resulting in a stroke. In 1982, Anderson joined Sir Oliver Humperdink's stable, the House of Humperdink. Humperdink acted as Anderson's manager for the remainder of his time in Mid-Atlantic Championship Wrestling (MACW).

=== Retirement (1985–1991) ===
Anderson wrestled his final match in 1985. Anderson ran a professional wrestling school with Nelson Royal. Wrestlers trained by Anderson included Ken Shamrock. Anderson later became a deputy sheriff in North Carolina.

== Personal life ==
Anderson was married to Edith "Edie" Anderson (née Simpson). The couple had a son, Brad, who also became a professional wrestler, as well as two daughters, Alicia Anderson and Pauline Anderson. Anderson had a damaged neck, which caused him to constantly twitch.

== Death ==
Anderson died of a sudden heart attack on October 31, 1991, while attending a law enforcement training event in Huntersville, North Carolina.

== Championships and accomplishments ==
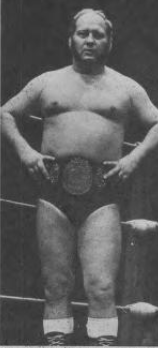
Gene Anderson as tag team champion, c. 1982

- Georgia Championship Wrestling
  - NWA Georgia Tag Team Championship (7 times) - with Ole Anderson
  - NWA Macon Tag Team Championship (1 time) - with Ole Anderson
  - NWA Southeastern Tag Team Championship (Georgia version) (1 time) - with Ole Anderson
  - NWA Southern Tag Team Championship (Georgia version) (2 times) - with Lars Anderson
  - NWA World Tag Team Championship (Georgia Version) (1 time) - with Lars Anderson
- Mid-Atlantic Championship Wrestling
  - NWA Atlantic Coast Tag Team Championship (4 times) - with Ole Anderson
  - NWA Mid-Atlantic Tag Team Championship (2 times) - with Ole Anderson
  - NWA World Tag Team Championship (Mid-Atlantic version) (7 times, inaugural) - with Ole Anderson
- National Wrestling Alliance
  - NWA Hall of Fame (class of 2010)
- Pro Wrestling Illustrated
  - PWI Tag Team of the Year (1975, 1977) - with Ole Anderson
  - PWI ranked him # 60 of the 100 best tag teams during the "PWI Years" with Ivan Koloff in 2003

== See also ==
- Anderson family
- Minnesota Wrecking Crew
