= Freddie Miller (broadcaster) =

American broadcaster

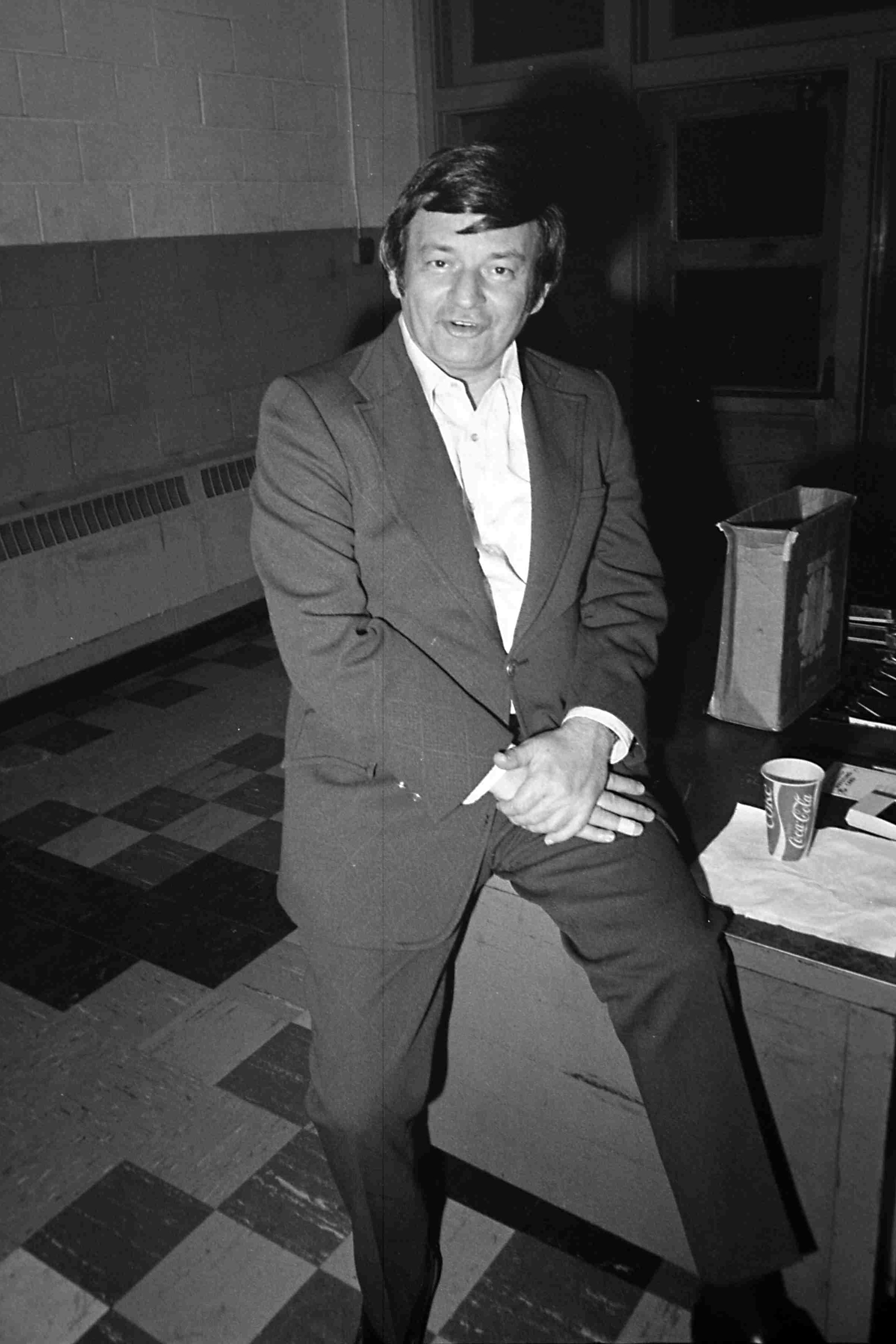
Freddie Miller photographed in the late 1970s prior to a wrestling card in Dalton, Georgia

Freddie G. Miller (February 19, 1929 – November 25, 1992) was a broadcaster and television personality in Atlanta, Georgia, United States. Miller worked for Atlanta television station WXIA-TV (then known by call letters including WLWA-TV and WQXI-TV) from the 1950s to the 1970s. His greatest exposure and notoriety came in the years following, for his role on the announcing team of professional wrestling programs broadcast on another Atlanta station, WTBS.

Miller is best remembered by wrestling fans as Gordon Solie's co-host on Georgia Championship Wrestling, which was later renamed World Championship Wrestling. When Vince McMahon, Jr. bought GCW's time slot, Solie left the promotion to remain with Ole Anderson and his renamed Championship Wrestling from Georgia, but Miller stayed on until McMahon sold the promotion and time slot to Jim Crockett, Jr. of Jim Crockett Promotions. Miller conducted some interviews, but his primary duties were to announce upcoming house shows in the segue to commercial breaks, in much the same fashion as was done in the WWF at the time by Howard Finkel. McMahon also used Miller on his flagship show WWF Championship Wrestling for conducting backstage interviews into 1985.

Miller is also remembered for his trademark phrase "Don't miss it...BEEE THERE" (emphasis intentional) when advertising upcoming house shows. He was also the subject of ribbing by the boys for his over-enthusiastic pronunciation of "STOOOOOBENVILLE OHIO", one of the stops on the Georgia circuit. During McMahon's ownership of Georgia Championship Wrestling, Miller served double duty as co-host of Gorilla Monsoon and as ring announcer for in-studio matches. On Black Saturday, July 14, 1984, Miller opened the program, and briefly described the new programming which would be offered through the WWF, then introduced McMahon. This moment has been featured on numerous WWE Home Video releases, most notably The Rise and Fall of WCW.

Miller is also remembered as the host of Stars of Tomorrow and Dance Party – both locally produced shows which featured local talent. He also hosted local showings of horror films on WXIA's version of the Dialing for Dollars franchise.

After leaving GCW, he retired as an on-air personality and later did voice-overs for WCW house shows into the 1990s. Miller made a final on-camera appearance at Clash of the Champions XX: 20th Anniversary. He died from a heart attack on November 25, 1992, at the age of 63.
