= Angelo Mosca =

American-Canadian football player and professional wrestler (1937–2021)

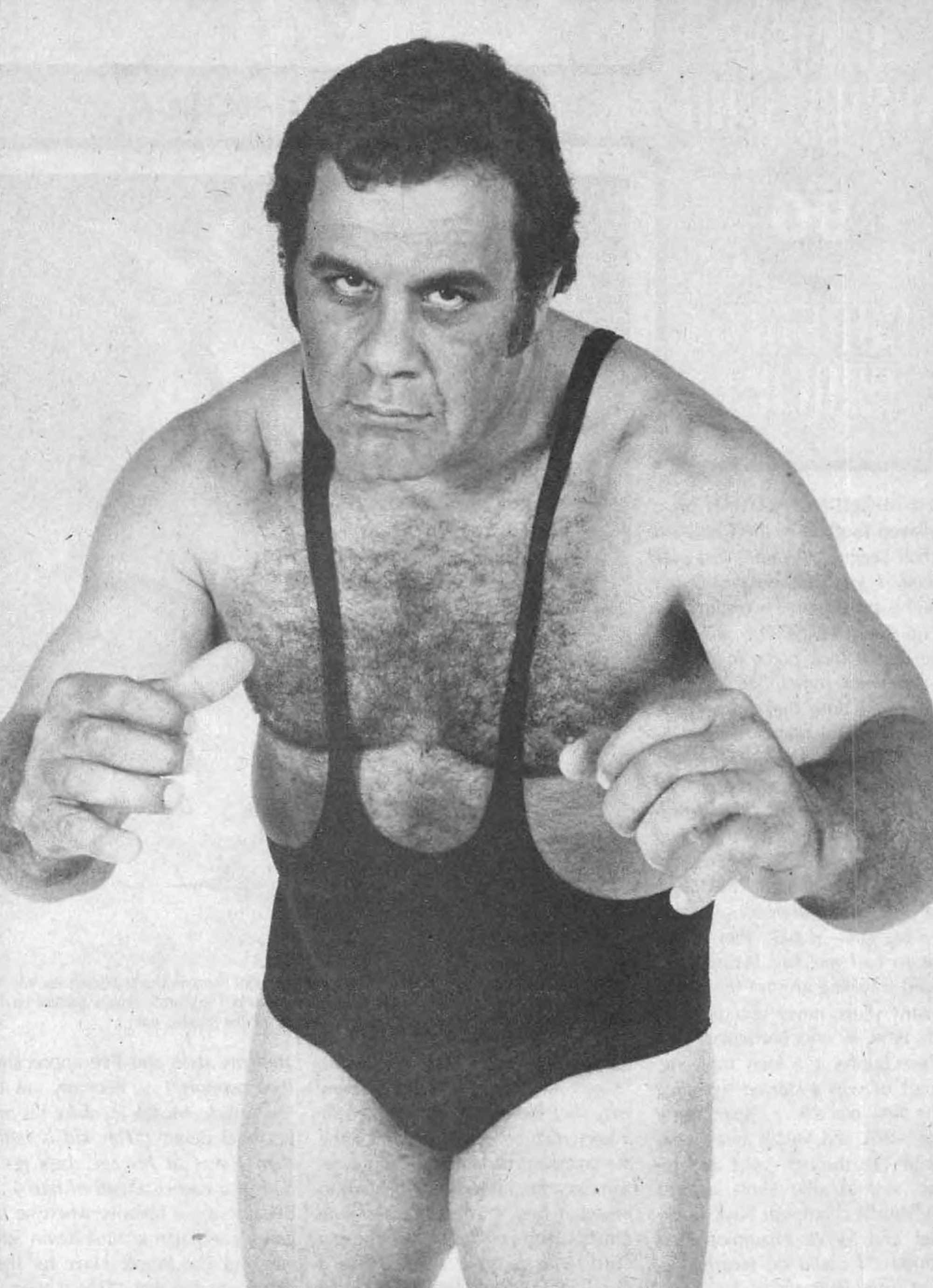
- Mosca, circa 1984

No. 68
- Position: Defensive tackle

Personal information
- Born: February 13, 1937; Waltham, Massachusetts, U.S.
- Died: November 6, 2021 (aged 84); Hamilton, Ontario, Canada
- Listed height: 6 ft 4 in (1.93 m)
- Listed weight: 275 lb (125 kg)

Career information
- College: Notre Dame
- NFL draft: 1959: 30th round, 350th overall pick

Career history
- Hamilton Tiger-Cats (1958–1959); Ottawa Rough Riders (1960–1961); Montreal Alouettes (1962); Hamilton Tiger-Cats (1962–1972)

Awards and highlights
- 5× Grey Cup champion (1960, 1963, 1965, 1967, 1972); 2× CFL All-Star (1963, 1970); 5× CFL East All-Star (1960, 1963, 1965, 1966, 1970); 2× CFL's Most Outstanding Lineman Award - Runner Up (1963, 1970)
- Canadian Football Hall of Fame (Class of 1987)

Angelo Valentino Mosca (February 13, 1937 – November 6, 2021) was an American professional football player and professional wrestler. He was a defensive lineman in the Canadian Football League (CFL). As a wrestler, Mosca was known by the nicknames King Kong Mosca and the Mighty Hercules. He had a son, Angelo Jr., who also wrestled. Mosca was elected to the Canadian Football Hall of Fame in 1987, the Hamilton Sports Hall of Fame in 2012, and the Ontario Sports Hall of Fame in 2013.

== Early life ==
The second oldest boy in a family of four boys and seven girls, Mosca was born on February 13, 1937, in Waltham, Massachusetts, to Agnes and Angelo Mosca. His father Angelo was an immigrant from Panni in southern Italy, and his mother's mother was an African-American (and also half-Italian and half-Black), which was kept a secret from neighbours in their segregated, working-class neighbourhood in Waltham since New England was not known for its racial tolerance at the time. Mosca's parents were alcoholics, and he was often neglected and abused by them, which led Mosca to run away from home at the age of 16. His father died in 1986, and his mother died at the age of 93.

== Football career ==
Mosca attended the University of Notre Dame on a scholarship, but was kicked out for bookmaking. He then transferred to University of Wyoming as a redshirt who never played a single down for the football team. He was booted out for theft, allegedly stealing typewriters and cameras from stores and selling them on campus. He was drafted by the NFL's Philadelphia Eagles in 1959 in the 30th round (350th overall). He had already decided to play in the CFL, in 1958 for the Hamilton Tiger-Cats. He went to Hamilton the same year after graduating from Notre Dame with a degree in business administration. He was traded to the Ottawa Rough Riders for Hardiman Cureton on August 15, 1960, and played for the Rough Riders in 1960 and 1961 before joining the Montreal Alouettes in 1962 for 5 games. He played his remaining years, 1962 to 1972 in Hamilton and was a five-time all star.

Mosca played both offensive and defensive tackle, middle guard and end. He played in nine Grey Cup games, more than any other player in CFL history, tied with his teammate John Barrow. Mosca's teams won five Grey Cup games, one with the Ottawa Rough Riders and four with the Hamilton Tiger-Cats.

He is infamous for the 51st Grey Cup game out-of-bounds and late hit on BC Lions star running back Willie Fleming. With Fleming out of the game, the Tiger-Cats went on to win the Grey Cup and Mosca's reputation as being the meanest CFL player grew. It was a reputation he later promoted as the notorious professional wrestler "King Kong" Mosca. Mosca was the runner-up for the Schenley Most Outstanding Lineman award in 1963 and 1970. He also only missed one game his entire football career.

On August 25, 2015, the Tiger-Cats announced that they would retire Mosca's jersey number 68.

== Professional wrestling career ==
Angelo Mosca
Professional wrestling career
- Ring name(s): King Kong; King Mosca; Angelo Mosca Sr.
- Billed height: 6 ft 4 in (193 cm)
- Billed weight: 319 lb (145 kg)
- Debut: 1959
- Retired: 1986

Mosca was brought into wrestling by Montreal promoter Eddie Quinn. He began wrestling in the off-season, and became a full-time wrestler after his retirement from football. He wrestled all across North America, always at or near the top of the card, and almost always as a heel, even in Toronto until the late 1970s, then he became a face, and in the early 1980s, the lead face. He also wrestled in Verne Gagne's American Wrestling Association and in Stu Hart's Stampede Wrestling, where he was frequently paired with "Superstar" Billy Graham in tag team competition. During the mid '70s and '80s, Mosca worked in the Carolinas, facing top stars such as Ric Flair, Wahoo McDaniel, Blackjack Mulligan, and Ivan Koloff.

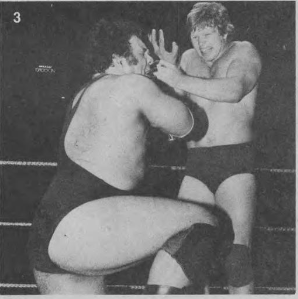
Mosca and Bob Backlund, c. 1982

In 1981, during his time in the World Wrestling Federation, Mosca wrestled as (often – in a reversal of his character in Canada) the promotion's most hated heel due to his brutal style. He became a top challenger to WWF Champion Bob Backlund's World Championship, but was not successful in winning the belt. He also engaged in a feud with Pat Patterson, a part-time wrestler who also did color commentary on the WWF's syndicated programs, after Mosca attacked Patterson at a television taping with a water pitcher; Patterson had grown disgusted with Mosca's rulebreaking tactics and, setting off the attack, publicly thanked a referee for disqualifying Mosca for refusing to pin his jobber opponent.

Mosca was the colour commentator and wrestled for the WWF TV tapings in Ontario from August 1984 until January 1985 as a babyface. After being fired by the WWF, Mosca promoted the NWA in Ontario in 1985-87. He and Milt Avruskin hosted a TV show featuring compilations of NWA matches. Mosca organized an NWA card in Hamilton in February 1986 called "Moscamania" that drew an excellent house of 12,000 but the follow-up a year later drew only 3,200. He retired from wrestling in 1986.

Mosca's son, Angelo Mosca Jr., had a brief wrestling career. Mosca managed his son for a brief time in late 1984 in the WWF.

== Personal life ==
Mosca lived in and around Hamilton for many years, and lived in St. Catharines, Ontario, with his wife, Helen, a real estate agent. He first met her in 1996 at a Ticats game; they married in 1998. His first wife, the mother of his two children, died of cancer. His second wife, to whom he was married 20 years, suffered a fatal heart attack.

He authored a book with Steve Milton called Tell Me To My Face, published by Lulu Canada Inc. The book was released in September 2011.

In 2011, Mosca got into a fight with former B.C. Lions quarterback Joe Kapp at a CFL alumni luncheon regarding a controversial hit Mosca had made in the 1963 Grey Cup game. After Kapp attempted to give flowers to Mosca, Mosca hit Kapp on the head with his cane, prompting Kapp to knock Mosca down with a punch. The video of the fight went viral, receiving over 647,000 views on YouTube and mentions on ESPN's Monday Night Football and on Fox TV's The O'Reilly Factor. Mosca auctioned off the cane he used against Kapp at the following year's alumni luncheon for $7,700 (equivalent to $10,372 in 2025), with the money going towards the alumni association's "dire straits" fund for struggling former players.

Mosca appeared in several Canadian TV commercials in the 1970s and 1980s. Mosca still made PR appearances for the league and the Ticats and for other businesses.

In February 2015, he revealed that he had been diagnosed with Alzheimer's disease, which took away his ability to swallow or eat solid foods.

His number 68 football jersey was retired by the Hamilton Tiger-Cats football club on August 27, 2015, in a ceremony at Tim Hortons Field in Hamilton.

In July 2016, Mosca was named part of a class action lawsuit filed against WWE which alleged that wrestlers incurred traumatic brain injuries during their tenure and that the company concealed the risks of injury. The suit was litigated by attorney Konstantine Kyros, who has been involved in a number of other lawsuits against WWE. US District Judge Vanessa Lynne Bryant dismissed the lawsuit in September 2018.

== Death ==
Mosca died at the Macassa Lodge in Hamilton at age 84 on November 6, 2021. He had stayed there for a number of years.

== Championships and accomplishments ==
=== North American football ===
- Canadian Football League
  - Canadian Football Hall of Fame (Class of 1987)
  - Ranked No. 37 of the Top 50 players of the league's modern era by Canadian sports network TSN

=== Professional wrestling ===
- American Wrestling Association
  - AWA British Empire Heavyweight Championship (1 time)
- Big Time Wrestling (San Francisco)
  - NWA United States Heavyweight Champion (San Francisco version) (1 time)
- Cauliflower Alley Club
  - Other honoree (1996)
- Championship Wrestling from Florida
  - NWA Florida Bahamian Championship (1 time)
  - NWA Florida Global Tag Team Championship (1 time) – with Bobby Duncum
  - NWA Southern Heavyweight Championship (Florida version) (1 time)
- Georgia Championship Wrestling
  - NWA Columbus Heavyweight Championship (1 time)
  - NWA Georgia Heavyweight Championship (1 time)
  - NWA Macon Heavyweight Championship (1 time)
- Maple Leaf Wrestling
  - NWA Canadian Heavyweight Champion (Toronto version) (4 times)
- Mid-Atlantic Championship Wrestling
  - NWA Mid-Atlantic Television Championship (2 times)
- NWA Tri-State
  - NWA Tri-State Brass Knuckles Championship (1 time)
- Pro Wrestling Illustrated
  - Ranked No. 305 of the 500 best singles wrestlers during the PWI Years in 2003
- Stampede Wrestling
  - Stampede North American Heavyweight Championship (1 time)
  - Stampede Wrestling Hall of Fame (Class of 1995)
- World Wrestling Council
  - WWC Caribbean Heavyweight Championship (1 time)
- Wrestling Observer Newsletter
  - Worst Television Announcer (1984)

== See also ==
- List of gridiron football players who became professional wrestlers
