= Bill Dromo =

Canadian professional wrestler (1937–2012)

Personal information
- Born: June 28, 1937 Teulon, Manitoba, Canada
- Died: December 28, 2012 (aged 75) Carrlton, Georgia

Professional wrestling career
- Ring name(s): Bill Dromo; Big Bill Dromo; Bill Zbyszko; Mr. Griffin; Invader; Super Destroyer
- Billed height: 6 ft 3 in (1.91 m)
- Billed weight: 275 lb (125 kg)
- Trained by: Dave Piper
- Debut: 1958
- Retired: 1982

William Dromo (June 28, 1937 – December 28, 2012) was a Canadian professional wrestler who was best known as Bill Dromo.

== Professional wrestling career ==
Dromo made his wrestling debut in 1958 in Minnesota. He also worked during most of his career in Georgia, Florida, Texas, Hawaii, Memphis and Stampede Wrestling in Calgary. In 1966, he made a tour in Australia and numerous tours to Japan in the 1960s and 1970s.

In 1982, Dromo retired from wrestling.

== Personal life ==
Dromo died on December 28, 2012 at 75. He had suffered form Parkinson's disease for many years.

== Championships and accomplishments ==
- Championship Wrestling from Florida
  - NWA Southern Heavyweight Championship (Florida version) (1 time)
  - NWA Florida Television Championship (1 time)
- Mid-South Sports/Georgia Championship Wrestling
  - NWA Albany Heavyweight Championship (2 times)
  - NWA Columbus Heavyweight Championship (6 times)
  - NWA International Tag Team Championship (Georgia version) (1 time) – with Chief Little Eagle
  - NWA Macon Tag Team Championship (4 times) - with Alberto Torres (1) and Bob Armstrong (3)
  - NWA Southeastern Tag Team Championship (Georgia version) (6 times) - with Bob Armstrong (2), Roberto Soto (1), Mr. Wrestling II (1), Mike McCord (1) and Don Muraco (1)
- Japan Pro Wrestling Alliance
  - All Asia Heavyweight Championship (1 time)
- NWA Mid-America / Continental Wrestling Association
  - NWA Mid-America Tag Team Championship (3 times) – with Tojo Yamamoto (3) and Lorenzo Parente (1)
- Stampede Wrestling
  - Stampede International Tag Team Championship (1 time) – with Gil Hayes
