= Bobby Duncum =

American professional wrestler (1944–2026)

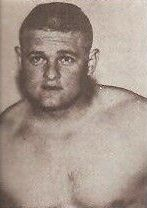
- Duncum in 1967

Personal information
- Born: Bobby Edward Duncum; August 14, 1944 Austin, Texas, U.S.
- Died: January 21, 2026 (aged 81)
- Education: West Texas A&M University
- Children: Bobby Duncum Jr.

Professional wrestling career
- Ring name(s): Bobby Duncum; Bob Duncum; Lord Robert Duncum; The Mummy; Spoiler #2
- Billed height: 6 ft 7 in (201 cm)
- Billed weight: 285 lb (129 kg)
- Billed from: Austin, Texas
- Trained by: Dory Funk Jr.
- Debut: 1966
- Retired: 1986
- Football career

No. 69
- Position: Tackle

Career information
- College: West Texas A&M
- NFL draft: 1967: 13th round, 331st overall pick

Career history
- St. Louis Cardinals (1968)
- Stats at Pro Football Reference

Robert Eldon Duncum (August 14, 1944 – January 21, 2026) was an American professional wrestler and football player. He is best known for his appearances for the World Wide Wrestling Federation, the National Wrestling Alliance and the American Wrestling Association from the late-1960s to the late-1980s. He was the father of the professional wrestler Bobby Duncum Jr.

== American football career ==
Duncum was a three-year letterman with the West Texas A&M Buffaloes football team from 1964 to 1966. He was selected by the St. Louis Cardinals in the thirteenth round (331st overall) of the 1967 NFL/AFL draft. He appeared in four games with the Cardinals in 1968.

== Professional wrestling career ==
His wrestling persona was that of a heel cowboy and he wrestled some of the top babyface stars of the era such as Bob Backlund and Bruno Sammartino in the WWWF/WWF. In the AWA, along with Nick Bockwinkel, Ray Stevens, and Blackjack Lanza, he was a member of the famous wrestling stable, managed by Bobby Heenan, known as "The Heenan Family". His famous catch phrase during interviews (and written phonetically) was "You unnastan?" ("you understand?"). His final match was on November 16, 1986, in Clarksburg, West Virginia, teaming with Lord Zoltan to defeat Troy Orndorff and Kurt Kaufman.

== Death ==
Duncum died on January 21, 2026, at the age of 81.

== Championships and accomplishments ==
- American Wrestling Association
  - AWA World Tag Team Championship (1 time) - with Blackjack Lanza
- Championship Wrestling from Florida
  - NWA Brass Knuckles Championship (Florida version) (2 times)
  - NWA Florida Global Tag Team Championship (1 time) - with Angelo Mosca
  - NWA Florida Tag Team Championship (3 times) - with Dick Murdoch (1 time), Don Jardine (1 time), and Killer Karl Kox (1 time)
  - NWA Florida Television Championship (1 time)
  - NWA Southern Heavyweight Championship (Florida version) (1 time)
  - NWA United States Tag Team Championship (Florida version) (1 time) - with Killer Karl Kox
- Mid-Atlantic Championship Wrestling
  - NWA Brass Knuckles Championship (Mid-Atlantic version) (1 time)
- Mid-South Sports / Georgia Championship Wrestling
  - NWA Columbus Heavyweight Championship (1 time)
  - NWA Georgia Tag Team Championship (1 time) - with Stan Vachon
  - NWA Macon Heavyweight Championship (1 time)
  - NWA Southeastern Heavyweight Championship (Georgia version) (1 time)
- NWA Big Time Wrestling
  - NWA Texas Tag Team Championship (1 time) - with Chris Colt
- Western States Sports
  - NWA Brass Knuckles Championship (Amarillo version) (1 time)
  - NWA Western States Tag Team Championship (2 times) - with Woody Farmer (1 time) and Dick Murdoch (1 time)

== See also ==
- List of gridiron football players who became professional wrestlers
