= Black Saturday (professional wrestling) =

Professional wrestling event

Vince McMahon appears on Superstation WTBS to announce the World Wrestling Federation's takeover of the World Championship Wrestling program.

In American professional wrestling, the term Black Saturday refers to Saturday, July 14, 1984, the day when Vince McMahon's World Wrestling Federation (WWF; now World Wrestling Entertainment, or WWE) took over the timeslot on Superstation WTBS that had been home to Georgia Championship Wrestling (GCW) and its flagship weekly program, World Championship Wrestling, for twelve years. McMahon's purchase led to a longstanding rivalry between himself and WTBS owner Ted Turner, who later bought GCW's successor on the network, Jim Crockett Promotions (JCP), and formed his own company under the World Championship Wrestling (WCW) name.

== Background ==
Georgia Championship Wrestling's (GCW) first weekly television series had premiered on Atlanta-based WTBS (then WTCG; now WPCH) in 1972, when station owner Ted Turner purchased the rights to air the program from competing station WQXI (now WXIA). From that date, GCW's program aired for two hours (from 6:00-8:00pm, and later from 6:05-8:05pm following the introduction of the "Turner Time" scheduling format in 1981) every Saturday night. In 1976, GCW became the first National Wrestling Alliance (NWA) territory to earn a national cable television contract as WTBS began to be carried by various cable and satellite providers nationwide as Superstation WTBS.

In 1982, GCW renamed its weekly program World Championship Wrestling, a name previously used for an Australian promotion owned by GCW partner Jim Barnett. Brothers Jack and Gerald Brisco had major stakes in the organization, while Ole Anderson was head booker and was basically in charge of operations. GCW's program was hosted by NWA announcer Gordon Solie, who also hosted programs for various other NWA-affiliated wrestling promotions at the time. World Championship Wrestling was a program featuring the "rasslin'" style of wrestling, that emphasized a more athletic product and put less emphasis on cartoonish gimmicks.

The following year, Vince McMahon, who as owner of the World Wrestling Federation (WWF; now World Wrestling Entertainment, or WWE) promoted the gimmicks that GCW fans were not traditionally receptive to and who in recent months had begun to expand his promotion nationwide, took control of the other major cable television contract at the time when he purchased Southwest Championship Wrestling's Sunday morning timeslot on USA Network for his All American Wrestling program. In 1984, in addition to the cable contract and his nationally syndicated offerings (WWF Championship Wrestling and WWF All-Star Wrestling), McMahon expanded further by premiering Tuesday Night Titans on USA Network.

Later in 1984, McMahon decided that, as part of his continued expansion, the WWF needed a second national cable outlet for its weekly programming. The only other cable deal available at the moment was the one GCW had with WTBS; if McMahon was able to acquire this timeslot, he would hold a monopoly on all nationally televised professional wrestling in the United States. Consequently, he approached Turner with an offer to buy GCW's Saturday night timeslot, only for Turner to reject him out of hand. McMahon, undeterred, tried to find another way of securing the timeslot for the WWF; he discovered that method shortly after his rejection by Turner.

The year before, Anderson had forced Barnett out of GCW upon allegedly discovering evidence that Barnett had committed embezzlement. McMahon subsequently approached Barnett to discuss a potential sale. The Brisco brothers, dissatisfied with Anderson's management of the promotion following Barnett's ouster, were similarly approached. All three men agreed to sell their stakes in GCW to McMahon, giving the WWF the controlling stake in the company and McMahon access to its WTBS timeslot. The last World Championship Wrestling program under GCW control aired on July 7, 1984.

In a 2025 episode of on the Something to Wrestle With podcast with Conrad Thompson, John Layfield (who was close with both Brisco brothers) spoke of how Anderson had offered a $5,000 bounty to any wrestler willing to shoot on the Briscos in the ring, an offer popularly misconstrued as soliciting a professional hit. Layfield said that Buzz Sawyer was one of the wrestlers who took Anderson up on the offer, but later backed out. He also said that Jerry Brisco told him that The Road Warriors were also offered the money, but warned the brothers what Anderson had done; he also called the move "chickenshit".

== Slot takeover and reception ==
The July 14 program opened with show co-host Freddie Miller (Solie was absent for reasons never made clear; he either resigned in protest or was terminated following the purchase, as were many other people involved with the former GCW regime) introducing McMahon and welcoming the WWF to WTBS. McMahon promised the GCW fans who were tuned in that they would enjoy his new program just as much.

However, unlike World Championship Wrestling, which had been a weekly show from the WTBS studios in Atlanta, the WWF's WTBS show at first consisted solely of highlights from the WWF's USA Network and syndicated programming, as well as house show clips from Madison Square Garden, Boston Garden and most of the other major arenas in which the promotion did business. This was in direct violation of a promise McMahon had made to Turner at the time of the purchase to provide original programming for WTBS, including having programs taped at the WTBS studios.

Finally, on March 2, 1985, the WWF began airing in-studio matches (while changing the name of the program to WWF Georgia Championship Wrestling) co-hosted by ring announcer Miller and play-by-play commentator Gorilla Monsoon. Along with these matches, Miller did interviews with many WWF stars, mainly to promote the first WrestleMania card. These programs ran until March 30, using the same set that would later be used by Jim Crockett Jr. when he purchased the Saturday night timeslot from McMahon.

The WWF program on WTBS was a ratings disaster from the start. GCW's core audience began writing and telephoning WTBS in droves, furious over the fact that GCW was no longer airing on the station and demanding to know why. Thousands of complaints were received, many of which focused on the loss of Solie. Turner himself was angered by the sinking ratings and made two decisions that would fix the problem.

First, Turner made an offer to Bill Watts, a promoter who ran Mid-South Wrestling (MSW) out of Oklahoma, to take a Sunday afternoon timeslot on WTBS. He also entered into negotiations to bring Championship Wrestling from Georgia, an NWA affiliate founded by Anderson after his ouster by McMahon and which the NWA regarded as the successor to GCW, to the station on Saturday mornings with Solie as announcer. McMahon was not happy with either of Turner's decisions, thinking his control of GCW would make the WWF the exclusive wrestling company on WTBS. Both MSW and Championship Wrestling from Georgia outperformed the WWF in ratings.

== Sale and aftermath ==
Losing money on the deal and desperately looking for help, McMahon turned to Barnett, who directed him to NWA President Jim Crockett Jr., the owner of Jim Crockett Promotions (JCP), which promoted wrestling shows in Virginia and the Carolinas. At the time, Crockett was trying to counter the WWF's national expansion by unifying the remaining NWA territories that McMahon had not driven out of business into one nationwide unit. Crockett, who had just bought out Championship Wrestling from Georgia, bought the World Championship Wrestling program from McMahon for $1 million and returned NWA programming to WTBS. This promotion would eventually become World Championship Wrestling (WCW) when Turner bought the promotion from Crockett in 1988 and later withdrew it from the NWA.

Despite his setback with regard to the WTBS timeslot, McMahon's USA Network contract and syndicated programming were not affected in any way. USA Network gave McMahon another timeslot when WWF Prime Time Wrestling, a similar program to the WWF's WTBS program that aired on Monday nights and was a forerunner to the current Monday Night Raw, debuted early in 1985. Due in large part to both parties' actions, McMahon and Turner began a rivalry that would continue for over a decade, before ending in 2001 when McMahon purchased the key assets of WCW from AOL Time Warner, which had previously purchased Turner's company in 1996.

Turner's decision to give timeslots to Watts and Anderson indirectly led to other wrestling promotions gaining national cable television contracts. Verne Gagne's American Wrestling Association (AWA) debuted on ESPN in 1985 and aired on the network until the company folded in 1991. Fritz Von Erich's World Class Championship Wrestling (WCCW) joined ESPN in 1986 and its Dallas-based successors, the United States Wrestling Association (USWA) and the Global Wrestling Federation (GWF), later occupied timeslots on that network as well. Herb Abrams' Universal Wrestling Federation (UWF) had a weekly program that aired on SportsChannel America. By 1994, none of these companies remained in business, with the exception of the Memphis-based branch of the USWA, which folded in 1997. During the 1990s, Philadelphia-based Extreme Championship Wrestling (ECW) rose to become the third-largest wrestling company in North America, behind the WWF and WCW. In 1999, it secured a cable deal to air a program on TNN, but the next year, TNN gained rights to WWF programming and dropped ECW, which folded in April 2001, shortly after the WWF's purchase of WCW's assets.

In July 2018, the Black Saturday episode was made available as a hidden gem on the WWE Network. Black Saturday was also covered by Vice TV in the season finale of Dark Side of the Ring's fifth season, which aired on May 7, 2024.
