= NWA Columbus Tag Team Championship =

Details
- Promotion: Georgia Championship Wrestling
- Date established: October 30, 1974
- Date retired: No later than February 1977
Statistics
- First champions: Ron Garvin and Terry Garvin
- Most reigns: Too uncertain to determine
- Longest reign: Too uncertain to determine
- Shortest reign: Too uncertain to determine

The NWA Columbus Tag Team Championship was a professional wrestling tag team championship in Georgia Championship Wrestling (GCW). A minor title complementing the NWA Columbus Heavyweight Championship, it was one of many state tag team championships recognized by the National Wrestling Alliance.

Some reigns were held by champions using a ring name, while others used their real name. There have been a total of 26 recognized individual champions and 15 recognized teams, who have had a combined 10 official reigns. The earliest recorded champions were Ron Garvin and Terry Garvin, and the last-known champions were Robert Fuller and Bob Armstrong. The following is a chronological list of teams that have been Columbus Tag Team Champions by ring name.

Key
No.	Overall reign number
Reign	Reign number for the specific team—reign numbers for the individuals are in parentheses, if different
Days	Number of days held

No.	Champion	Championship change			Reign statistics		Notes	Ref.
No.	Champion	Date	Event	Location	Reign	Days	Notes	Ref.
1	The Garvin Brothers (Ron Garvin and Terry Garvin)	October 30, 1974	Live event	Columbus, GA	1	28	Won a 6-team tournament final.	
2	The Mighty Yankees (Mighty Yankee #1 and Mighty Yankee #2)	November 27, 1974	GCW show	Columbus, GA	1	56		
3	Mr. Wrestling II and Danny Little Bear	January 22, 1975	GCW show	Columbus, GA	1	70		
4	Assassin #2 and Professor Tanaka	April 2, 1975	GCW show	Columbus, GA	1	64		
5	Mr. Wrestling and Mr. Wrestling II	June 5, 1975	GCW show	Columbus, GA	1	34		
6	Dick Slater and Bob Orton Jr.	July 9, 1975	GCW show	Columbus, GA	1	(Note: The exact date on which the title was lost is not known, which means their title reign lasted between 1 and 98 days.)		
7	Luke Graham and Moondog Mayne	1975	GCW show	Columbus, GA	1	N/A		
8	Dick Slater and Bobo Brazil	December 3, 1975	GCW show	Columbus, GA	1	N/A		
9	Luke Graham and Moondog Mayne	January 4, 1976 (NLT)	GCW show	Columbus, GA	2	(Note: The exact date on which the title was won is not known, which means their title reign lasted between 1 and 10 days.)		
10	Mr. Wrestling II and Bob Armstrong	January 14, 1976	GCW show	N/A	1	N/A		
Championship history is unrecorded from January 14, 1976 (NLT) to June 1976 (NLT).
11	The Spoiler and Abdullah the Butcher	June 1976 (NLT)	GCW show	Columbus, GA	1	(Note: The exact date on which the title was won is not known, which means their title reign lasted between 1 and 22 days.)		
12	Mark Lewin and Leon Ogle	June 23, 1976	GCW show	Columbus, GA	1	35		
13	Johnny Valiant and Jimmy Valiant	July 28, 1976	GCW show	Columbus, GA	1	49		
14	Pork Chop Cash and Tom Jones	September 15, 1976	GCW show	Columbus, GA	1	21		
15	Killer Brooks and Bill Howard	October 6, 1976	GCW show	Columbus, GA	1	N/A		
Championship history is unrecorded from October 6, 1976 (NLT) to February 1977 (NLT).
16	Robert Fuller and Bob Armstrong	February 1977 (NLT)	GCW show	N/A	1			
