= NWA Macon Heavyweight Championship =

Professional wrestling championship

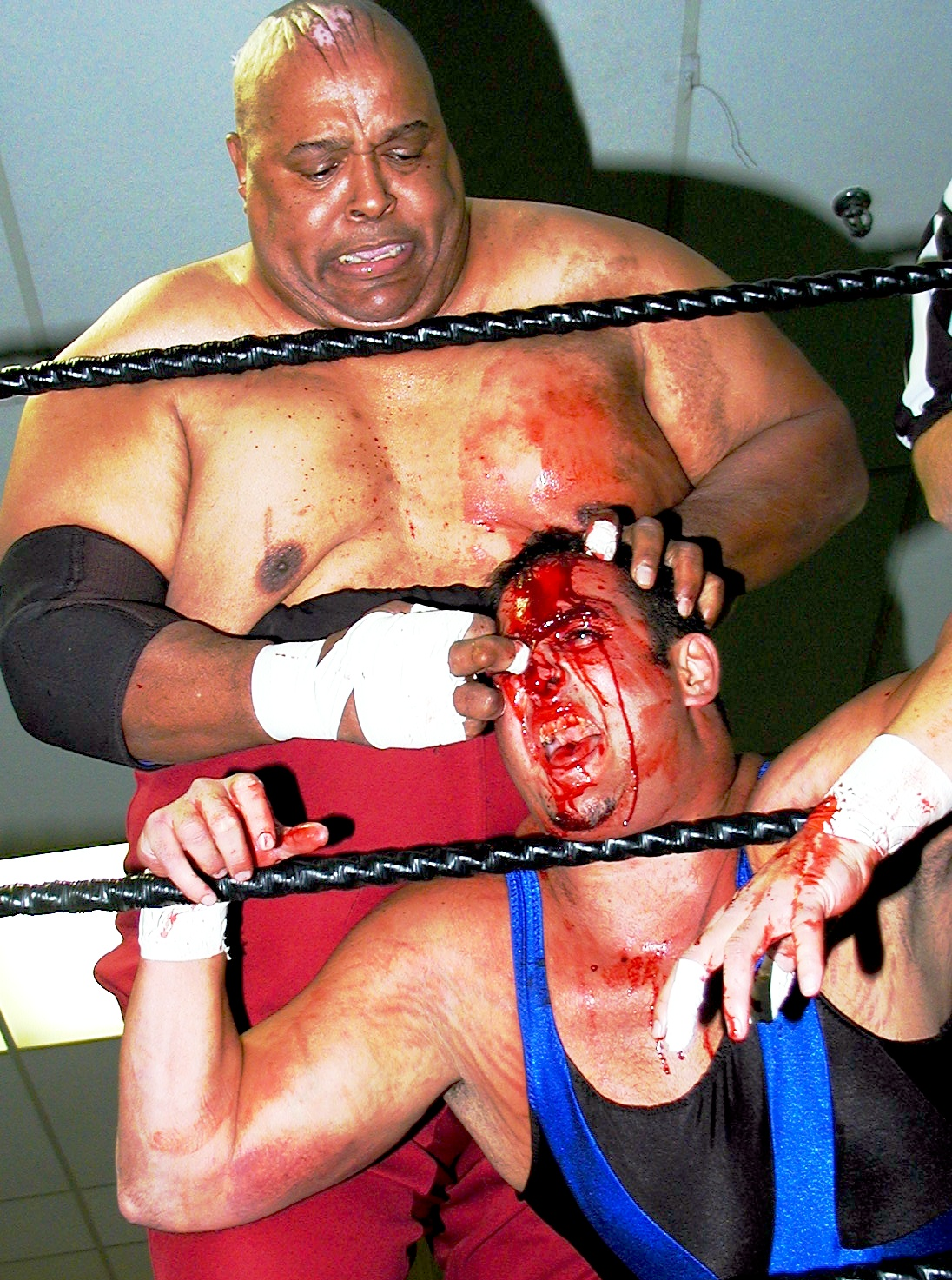
- Abdullah the Butcher is a former NWA Macon Heavyweight Champion.

Details
- Promotion: Georgia Championship Wrestling
- Date established: August 14, 1973
- Date retired: 1979
Statistics
- First champion: Buddy Colt
- Final champion: Tommy Rich
- Most reigns: Mr. Wrestling II (4)
- Longest reign: Dick Slater (285 days)
- Shortest reign: Bob Armstrong (9 days)

The NWA Macon Heavyweight Championship was a professional wrestling regional championship in Georgia Championship Wrestling (GCW). It was a secondary title, complementing the NWA Macon Tag Team Championship, and defended almost exclusively at the Macon City Auditorium and Macon Coliseum throughout the 1970s.

The Macon titles were one of two sets of GCW's citywide championships, along with the NWA Columbus Heavyweight Championship and NWA Columbus Tag Team Championship, and one of a select few city championships recognized by the National Wrestling Alliance. The final champion was "Wildfire" Tommy Rich before the title was eventually abandoned after 1979.

There have been a total of 13 recognized champions who have had a combined 22 official reigns, with Mr. Wrestling II holding the most at four. The longest reigning champion was "Dirty" Dick Slater, who held the title for 285 days. The shortest reigning champion was "Bullet" Bob Armstrong, whose first reign lasted only nine days.

== Title history ==
Key
No.	Overall reign number
Reign	Reign number for the specific champion
Days	Number of days held

No.	Champion	Championship change			Reign statistics		Notes	Ref.
No.	Champion	Date	Event	Location	Reign	Days	Notes	Ref.
1	Buddy Colt	August 14, 1973	GCW show	Macon, Georgia	1	35	Won title in a one-night 16-man championship tournament.	
2	Bob Armstrong	September 18, 1973	GCW show	Macon, Georgia	1	147		
3	Bobby Duncum	February 12, 1974	GCW show	Macon, Georgia	1	35		
4	Bob Armstrong	March 19, 1974	GCW show	Macon, Georgia	2	42		
5	Bobby Duncum	April 30, 1974	GCW show	Macon, Georgia	2	14		
6	Mr. Wrestling II	May 14, 1974	GCW show	Macon, Georgia	1	(Note: The exact date on which the title was vacated is not known, which means their title reign lasted between 1 and 307 days.)		
—	Vacated	1975	—	—	—	—	Championship vacated for unknown reasons.	
7	Toru Tanaka	March 18, 1975	GCW show	Macon, Georgia	1	84	Defeated Danny Little Bear in a tournament final.	
8	Bob Armstrong	June 10, 1975	GCW show	Macon, Georgia	3	9		
9	Dick Slater	June 19, 1975	GCW show	Macon, Georgia	1	285		
10	Stan Stasiak	March 30, 1976	GCW show	Macon, Georgia	1	28		
11	Mr. Wrestling II	April 27, 1976	GCW show	Macon, Georgia	2	(Note: The exact date on which the title was lost is not known, which means their title reign lasted between 266 and 307 days.)		
Championship history is unrecorded from April 27, 1976 to March 1977 (NLT).
12	J. J. Dillon	March 1977 (NLT)	GCW show	Macon, Georgia	1			
13	Mr. Wrestling II	March 29, 1977	GCW show	Macon, Georgia	3	42		
14	Ole Anderson	May 10, 1977	GCW show	Macon, Georgia	1	245		
15	Dick Slater	January 10, 1978	GCW show	Macon, Georgia	2	(Note: The exact date on which the title was vacated is not known, which means their title reign lasted between 50 and 80 days.)		
—	Vacated	March 1978	—	—	—	—	Championship vacated for unknown reasons.	
16	Tommy Rich	March 14, 1978	GCW show	Macon, Georgia	1	42	Defeated Stan Hansen in a tournament final.	
17	Abdullah the Butcher	April 25, 1978	GCW show	Macon, Georgia	1	28		
18	Mr. Wrestling II	May 23, 1978	GCW show	Macon, Georgia	4	140		
19	Angelo Mosca	October 10, 1978	GCW show	Macon, Georgia	1	112		
20	Wahoo McDaniel	January 30, 1979	GCW show	Macon, Georgia	1	(Note: The exact date on which the title was vacated is not known, which means their title reign lasted between 214 and 243 days.)		
—	Vacated	September 1979	—	—	—	—	Championship vacated for unknown reasons.	
21	Killer Karl Kox	September 25, 1979	GCW show	Macon, Georgia	1	12	Defeated Tommy Rich in a tournament final.	
22	Tommy Rich	October 7, 1979	GCW show	Macon, Georgia	2	50		
—	Deactivated	1979	—	—	—	—	Championship is vacated for unknown reasons and subsequently abandoned in favor of the NWA Georgia Heavyweight Championship.	

== List of top combined reigns ==
¤	The exact length of several title reigns are uncertain, so the shortest possible length is used.

List of combined reigns
Rank	Champion	No. of reigns	Combined days
1	Dick Slater	2	285¤
2	Ole Anderson	1	245
3	Bob Armstrong	3	198
4	Mr. Wrestling II	4	182¤
5	Angelo Mosca	1	112
5	Tommy Rich	2	92
6	Toru Tanaka	1	84
7	Bobby Duncum	2	49
8	Stan Stasiak	1	38
9	Buddy Colt	1	35
10	Abdullah the Butcher	1	28
11	Killer Karl Kox	1	12
12	James Dillon	1	N/A
13	Wahoo McDaniel	1	N/A
