= WCW World Tag Team Championship =

Former wrestling championship

- The final belt design of the WCW World Tag Team Championship. (1998-2001)

Details
- Promotion: NWA/JCP (1975–1988); WCW (1988–2001); WWF (2001)
- Date established: January 29, 1975
- Date retired: November 18, 2001 (unified with the WWF Tag Team Championship and became Undisputed/Unified WWF Tag Team Championship)

Other names
- NWA World Tag Team Championship (Mid-Atlantic) (1975–1991); WCW World Tag Team Championship (WCW) (1991–2001); WCW/nWo World Tag Team Championship (WCW) (1998); WCW Tag Team Championship (WWF) (2001); Unified/Undisputed WWF Tag Team Championship (November 18, 2001)
Statistics
- First champions: The Minnesota Wrecking Crew (Gene and Ole Anderson)
- Final champions: Dudley Boyz (Bubba Ray Dudley and D-Von Dudley)
- Most reigns: As Tag Team (10 reigns): Harlem Heat (Booker T and Stevie Ray); As Individual (11 reigns): Booker T
- Longest reign: Doom (Butch Reed and Ron Simmons) (282 days)
- Shortest reign: The Misfits In Action (Cpl. Cajun and Lt. Loco) (<30 min)
- Oldest champion: Diamond Dallas Page (44 years, 256 days)
- Youngest champion: David Flair (20 years, 304 days)
- Heaviest champion: Scott Hall and The Giant (728 lb (330 kg) combined)
- Lightest champion: Rey Mysterio and Juventud Guerrera (330 lb (150 kg) combined)

The WCW World Tag Team Championship, originally known as the NWA World Tag Team Championship (Mid-Atlantic version), was a professional wrestling world tag team championship in World Championship Wrestling (WCW) and later the World Wrestling Federation (WWF, now WWE). It was the original world tag team title of WCW that existed from 1975 under the Jim Crockett Promotions banner until its closure in 2001.

After the acquisition of WCW's assets by the WWF in March 2001, it became one of two tag team titles in the WWF, with its name being immediately abbreviated to the WCW Tag Team Championship. It continued to complement the then-WWF Tag Team Championship until November 2001, when both titles were unified.

== History ==
The WCW World Tag Team Championship was originally created as the NWA World Tag Team Championship of Mid-Atlantic Championship Wrestling (MACW) run by Jim Crockett Promotions (JCP). Following the title's introduction in 1975, the Minnesota Wrecking Crew became the inaugural champions on January 29. The title was renamed the WCW World Tag Team Championship in 1991 when Ted Turner bought JCP and it became World Championship Wrestling. Despite the title's name in MACW, the National Wrestling Alliance (NWA) did not recognize its own NWA World Tag Team Championship until 1992, when the NWA held a tournament to crown the first tag team recognized by all of the NWA territories. Terry Gordy and Steve Williams won the tournament. As a result of Gordy and Williams being the WCW World Tag Team Champions when they became NWA World Tag Team Champions, both titles were defended together until WCW left the NWA in September 1993. On January 17, 2008, the NWA withdrew its recognition of every WCW World Tag Team Champion linked to the NWA World Tag Team Championship, officially stating that their titles were formed in 1995.

In March 2001, the World Wrestling Federation (WWF) purchased WCW. Soon after, The Invasion took place in which The Alliance (an alliance between WCW and ECW) was formed to fight against the WWF. During this time, the title was referred to as the WCW Tag Team Championship. The Final WCW Tag Team Champions as of the last WCW Monday Nitro was Sean O'Haire and Chuck Palumbo. They were signed to WWE during the invasion and debuted as the 'WCW Tag Team Champions'. Shortly after their WWF (WWE) Debut the WCW Tag Team Championships were won by Kane and The Undertaker after they defeated O'Haire and Palumbo on Smackdown (August 9th, 2001). A few weeks later At SummerSlam, the WCW Tag Team Champions Kane and The Undertaker defeated Chris Kanyon and Diamond Dallas Page for the WWF Tag Team Championship in a steel cage match to unify the two titles for the first time ever. Both titles remained independently active during this reign, with Kane and The Undertaker first losing the WWF Tag Team Championship to The Dudley Boyz (Bubba Ray Dudley and D-Von Dudley) on the September 17 episode of Raw, followed by the loss of the WCW Tag Team Championship to Booker T and Test on the September 25 episode of SmackDown!. At Survivor Series, the WCW Tag Team Champions The Dudley Boyz defeated the WWF Tag Team Champions The Hardy Boyz (Jeff Hardy and Matt Hardy) in a steel cage unification match. The WCW Tag Team Championship was then retired with WWE (the former WWF) officially recognizing The Dudley Boyz as the final champions.

== Reigns ==
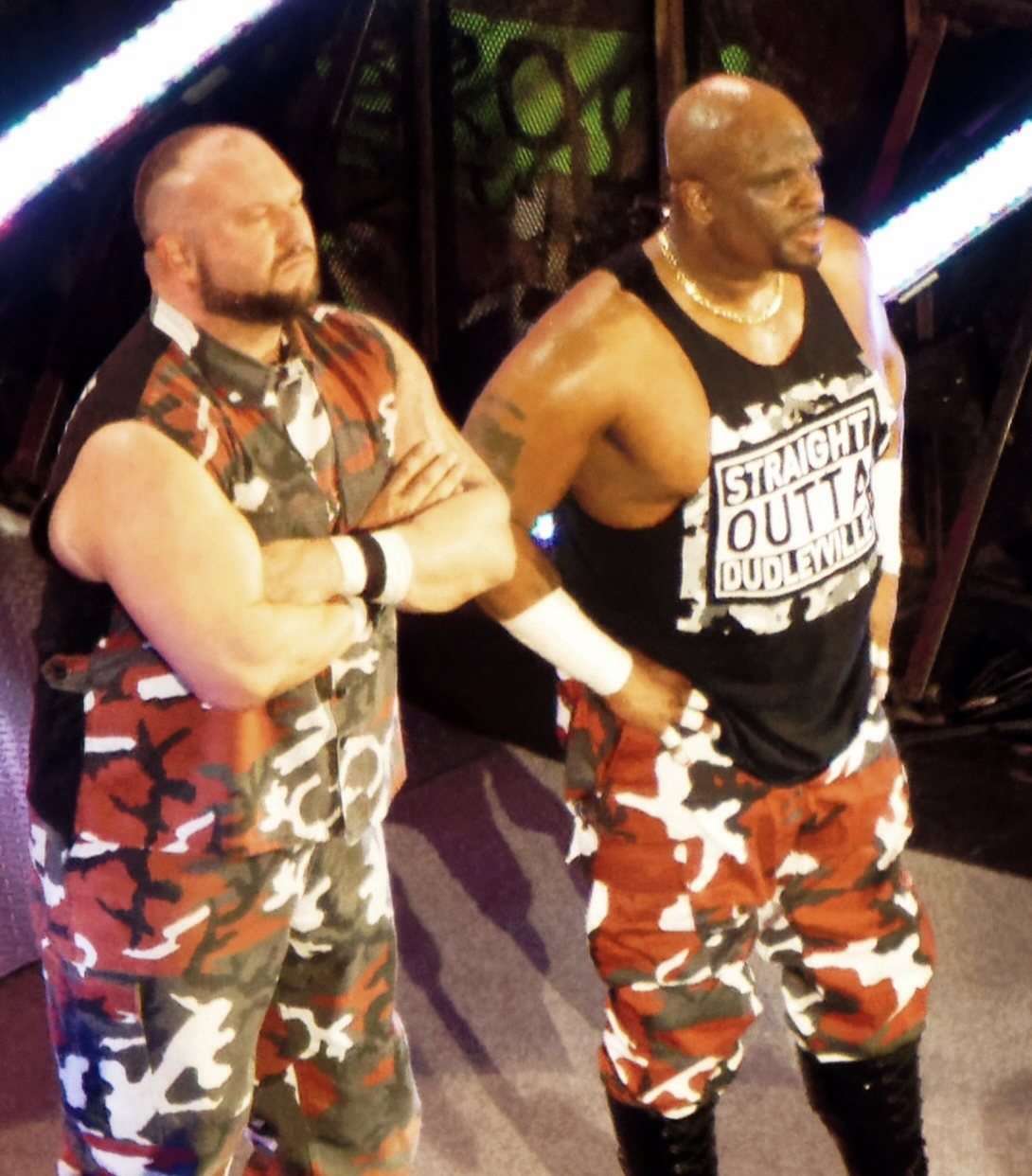
The Dudley Boyz were the final WCW World Tag Team Champions.

The inaugural champions were Minnesota Wrecking Crew (Gene and Ole Anderson), who were crowned as champions on January 29, 1975. The record for longest reign was held by Doom, whose only reign lasted 282 days. Harlem Heat held the record for most reigns as a team with 12. Booker T held the record for overall reigns as an individual with 11.

The final champions were The Dudley Boyz (Bubba Ray Dudley and D-Von Dudley), who won the titles from The Hardy Boyz (Matt Hardy and Jeff Hardy) on the October 23, 2001 episode of SmackDown!. After the WCW Tag Team Championship was deactivated at Survivor Series, the duo continued to serve as the WWF Tag Team Champions until their loss to Spike Dudley and Tazz on the January 7, 2002 episode of Raw in a hardcore match.

== See also ==
- Tag team championships in WWE
