= Mr. Wrestling II =

American professional wrestler (1934–2020)

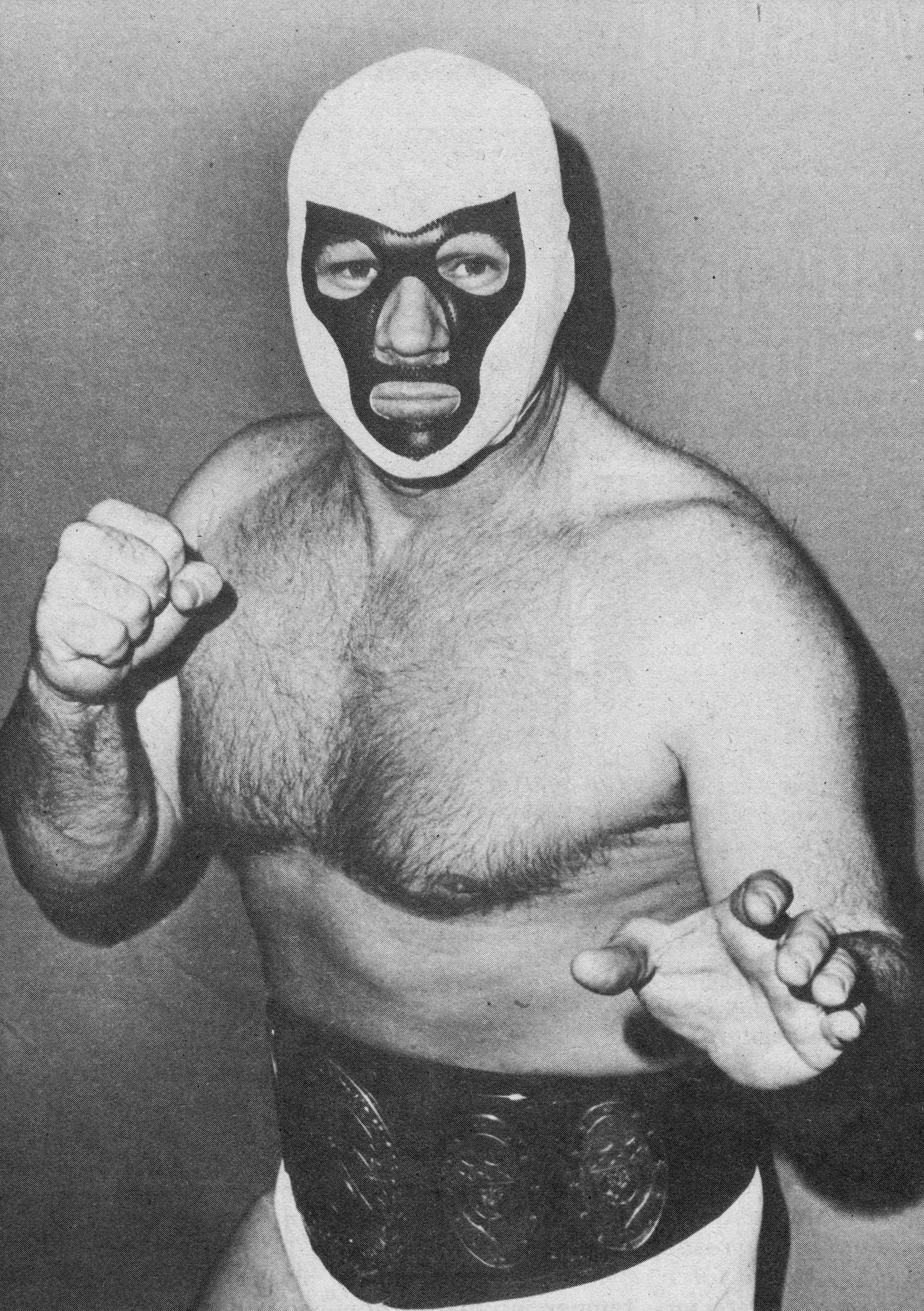

Personal information
- Born: John Francis Walker; September 10, 1934 Charleston, South Carolina, U.S.
- Died: June 10, 2020 (aged 85) Honolulu, Hawaii, U.S.

Professional wrestling career
- Ring name(s): The Grappler; Johnny Walker; Mr. Wrestling; Mr. Wrestling II
- Billed height: 6 ft 0 in (1.83 m)
- Billed weight: 247 lb (112 kg)
- Billed from: Atlanta, Georgia
- Trained by: Tony Morelli; Pat O'Connor
- Debut: 1955
- Retired: October 13, 2007

John Francis Walker (September 10, 1934 – June 10, 2020), better known by the ring name Mr. Wrestling II, was an American professional wrestler. He is best known for his appearances with Championship Wrestling from Florida and Georgia Championship Wrestling in the 1970s and early 1980s.

== Professional wrestling career ==
=== Early career (1955–1964) ===
Walker was trained by Tony Morelli and Pat O'Connor. He debuted in 1955 under the ring name Johnny Walker.

After debuting as a wrestler, Walker spent a good portion of his early career (approximately from the late 1950s to the 1960s) as journeyman wrestler Johnny "Rubberman" Walker, a mainstay of Houston promoter Paul Boesch. Boesch gave him the nickname due to his flexibility.

Walker retired in 1964.

=== The Grappler (1967–1972) ===
Walker came out of retirement in 1967. In the early 1970s, Walker wrestled on the independent circuit in Florida under a mask as the Grappler.

=== Mr. Wrestling II (1972–1984) ===
In 1972, Walker was semi-retired and running a gas station in Tennessee. Georgia promoter Paul Jones and his booker Leo Garibaldi asked him to return to wrestling as the masked Mr. Wrestling II. Introduced as the partner of the original Mr. Wrestling (Tim Woods), Walker would take his place in many instances. Eddie Graham, the owner of the NWA Florida promotion, was also a part owner of the Georgia promotion. Graham was sending talent back and forth between the two promotions, due to the promotional war that occurred in Atlanta over a dispute with Ray Gunkel's widow Ann Gunkel and her "outlaw promotion" All-South Wrestling Alliance.

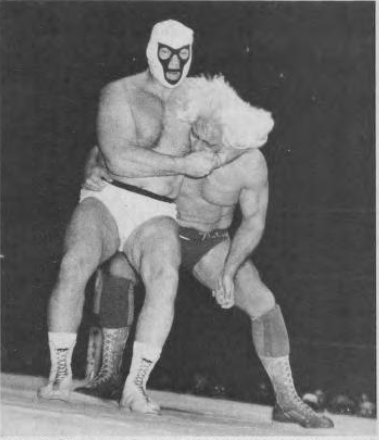
Mr. Wrestling II with Ric Flair in a headlock during a match, c. 1982

Walker as Mr. Wrestling II became an immediate top draw and legend for the territory, leading to ten reigns as the Georgia Heavyweight Champion. During Walker's time in Georgia as Mr. Wrestling II, he was considered one of the top five most-popular wrestlers in the United States. He also attracted a high-profile fan in Jimmy Carter, at the time the governor of Georgia.

While most of his career during the 1970s and 1980s was focused on the southeastern corner of the United States, he also made a prominent appearance in Mid-South Wrestling during 1983 and 1984 as the coach and mentor of a young wrestler named Magnum T. A. Vignettes aired on television, hosted by either Reisor Bowden or Jim Ross, in which Mr. Wrestling II was shown away from the ring with Magnum discussing his philosophy in taking on a rising young star in the role of a "coach" or showing training sessions with the two. As a tag team, they also won the promotion's tag team title from Butch Reed and Jim Neidhart on December 25, 1983.

Subtle seeds of resentment were planted along the way, which led to the pair splitting and feuding. Mr. Wrestling II turned his back on Magnum in a tag team match against The Midnight Express, which saw Magnum bloodied. On the following week's program, Mr. Wrestling II threw in the towel to cost Magnum the match while he was participating in the tournament for the promotion's television title, claiming that Magnum was too badly cut to continue. Mr. Wrestling II had previously won the North American Championship from the departing Junkyard Dog, which Magnum won from him in Tulsa, Oklahoma on May 13, 1984.

=== World Wrestling Federation (1984–1986) ===
Walker was later signed by Vince McMahon for the World Wrestling Federation in 1984, as part of McMahon's national expansion. However, as he was in the twilight of his career, Walker was mainly used as enhancement talent and rarely appeared on TV. He spent two years in the WWF before leaving in 1986.

=== Later career (1986–1990) ===
In 1986, Mr. Wrestling II worked for Continental Championship Wrestling feuding with Bob Armstrong. On May 5, he lost a Loser Leaves Town match to Armstrong. He returned to Continental in 1987, feuding with Jerry Stubbs. He later worked for Southern Championship Wrestling in 1988 and defeated Pat Rose on a Five Star Wrestling TV show in 1990.

=== Hawai'i Championship Wrestling (2007) ===
Mr. Wrestling II was the director of talent relations for Hawai'i Championship Wrestling. On October 13, 2007, he came out of retirement at 73 and won the HCW Kekaulike Heritage Tag Team Championship with Steve Corino as Mr. Wrestling 3, II's protégé.

== Carter family connections ==
Jimmy Carter, the governor of Georgia and later president of the United States during Mr. Wrestling II's 1970s heyday, considered Walker his favorite wrestler, as did Carter's mother, Lillian. Walker was invited to Carter's inauguration, but declined. The United States Secret Service insisted that he appear unmasked for security reasons. Due to his popularity at the time under the mask, he could not justify the possible ramifications of exposing his identity. He instead enjoyed several private audiences with Lillian. He faced scrutiny from the Secret Service on these occasions as well, but they went off without incident.

== Family ==
Walker had three sons, John Jr., Robert, and Mike, with his wife, Olivia. She was a seamstress and costume maker. Many of her clients were country music performers, including Porter Wagoner. During an interview, Ric Flair stated that many of his robes were made by her. She died in October 2000.

== Death ==
On June 10, 2020, Bill Apter reported that Walker had died, aged 85.

== Championships and accomplishments ==
- Big Time Promotions
  - Big Time Promotions Television Championship (2 times)
- Championship Wrestling from Florida
  - NWA Florida Heavyweight Championship (2 times)
  - NWA Florida Tag Team Championship (2 times) – with Boris Malenko (1), Big Bad John (1)
  - NWA Southern Heavyweight Championship (Florida version) (1 time)
- Continental Championship Wrestling
  - NWA Alabama Heavyweight Championship (1 time)
- Deep South Wrestling
  - DSW American Championship (1 time)
  - Deep South Heavyweight Championship (1 times)
- Hawai'i Championship Wrestling
  - HCW Kekaulike Heritage Tag Team Championship (1 time) – with Mr. Wrestling III
- Mid-South Sports / Georgia Championship Wrestling
  - NWA Georgia Heavyweight Championship (12 times)
  - NWA Macon Heavyweight Championship (4 times)
  - NWA Georgia Tag Team Championship (6 times) – with Bob Orton, Jr. (1), Mr. Wrestling I (4), and Tony Atlas (1)
  - NWA Macon Tag Team Championship (3 times) – with Mr. Wrestling I (2), and Jerry Lawler (1)
  - NWA Southeastern Tag Team Championship (Georgia version) (1 time) – with Bill Dromo
- National Wrestling Alliance
  - NWA Hall of Fame (Class of 2012)
- NWA Tri-State / Mid-South Wrestling Association
  - Mid-South Mississippi Heavyweight Championship (1 time)
  - Mid-South North American Championship (2 time)
  - Mid-South Tag Team Championship (2 times) – with Tiger Conway Jr. (1), and Magnum T. A. (1)
  - NWA North American Heavyweight Championship (Tri-State version) (2 time)
- NWA Big Time Wrestling
  - NWA Texas Tag Team Championship (1 time) - with Amazing Zuma
- NWA Mid-America
  - NWA Southern Tag Team Championship (Mid-America version) (9 times) – with Ken Lucas (2), Bob Ramstead (1), Sundown Kid (1), Dennis Hall (3), Tojo Yamamoto (1), and Bearcat Brown (1)
  - NWA United States Junior Heavyweight Championship (4 times)
  - NWA United States Tag Team Championship (Mid-America version) (1 time) – with Oni Maivia
  - NWA World Tag Team Championship (Mid-America version) (4 times) – with Len Rossi (2) and Bearcat Brown (2)
- North American Wrestling Alliance
  - NAWA Television Championship (1 time)
- Professional Wrestling Hall of Fame
  - Class of 2014
- Pro Wrestling Illustrated
  - PWI Wrestler of the Year (1975)
  - PWI Most Popular Wrestler of the Year (1980)
- Southern Championship Wrestling (Georgia)
  - SCW Tag Team Championship (1 time) - with Ranger Ross
- World Championship Wrestling
  - WCW Hall of Fame (Class of 1993)
- Wrestling Observer Newsletter
  - Most Overrated (1980)

He and Tony Atlas did win the NWA World Tag Team Championship (Mid-Atlantic version) at one time. However, the reign and win aren't official nor are they recognized.
