= NWA Macon Tag Team Championship =

Professional wrestling tag team championship

Details
- Promotion: Georgia Championship Wrestling (events in Macon, Georgia)
- Date established: September 16, 1969
- Date retired: December 23, 1975 (at the earliest)
Statistics
- First champions: Cyclone and Roberto Soto
- Most reigns: Individual: Bob Armstrong (6); Team: Bob Armstrong and Bill Dromo (3)

The NWA Macon Tag Team Championship was a tag team professional wrestling championship in Georgia Championship Wrestling, defended exclusively on events held at the Macon City Auditorium and Macon Coliseum in Macon, Georgia, United States. The title lasted from 1969 to 1975.

== Title history ==
Wrestlers:	Times:	Date:	Location:	Notes:
Cyclone and Roberto Soto	1	September 16, 1969	Macon, Georgia	Defeated The Assassins and The Super Assailants in a three-way round-robin match.
Buddy Colt and Homer O'Dell	1	January 13, 1970	Macon, Georgia	
El Mongol and Joe Scarpa	1	March 17, 1970	Macon, Georgia	
Buddy Colt (2) and Karl Von Stroheim	1	June 16, 1970	Macon, Georgia	
Bill Dromo and Alberto Torres	1	August 18, 1970	Macon, Georgia	
Skandor Akbar and Buddy Colt (3)	1	August 25, 1970	Macon, Georgia	
Bob Armstrong and Paul DeMarco	1	November 24, 1970	Macon, Georgia	This was a No Disqualification match.
The Assassins (Assassin #1 and Assassin #2)	1	December 15, 1970	Macon, Georgia	The Assassins' NWA Georgia Tag Team Championship was also on the line.
Bob Armstrong (2) and El Mongol (2)	1	January 12, 1971	Macon, Georgia	
Big Bad John and Buddy Colt (4)	1	October 19, 1971	Macon, Georgia	
Bob Armstrong (3) and Bill Dromo (2)	1	November 16, 1971	Macon, Georgia	This was a No Disqualification match.
Flash and Rocket Monroe	1	January 25, 1972	Macon, Georgia	
Bob Armstrong (4) and Bill Dromo (3)	2	April 25, 1972	Macon, Georgia	
The Assassins (Assassin #1 and Assassin #2)	2	May 9, 1972	Macon, Georgia	
Argentina Apollo and Bob Armstrong (5)	1	August 22, 1972	Macon, Georgia	
Skandor Akbar (5) and Rocket Monroe (2)	1	September 5, 1972	Macon, Georgia	
Argentina Apollo (2) and Tommy Seigler	1	November 14, 1972	Macon, Georgia	This was a No Disqualification match.
The title was vacated on November 28, 1972 in Macon, Georgia, after Apollo and Seigler left GCW for the All-South Wrestling Alliance.
The Super Infernos	1	February 27, 1973	Macon, Georgia	Won a 12-team one-night tournament.
Bob Armstrong (5) and Bill Dromo (4)	3	July 17, 1973	Macon, Georgia	
The Super Infernos	2	August 7, 1973	Macon, Georgia	This was a Title vs. Masks match.
Mr. Wrestling II and Mr. Wrestling	1	October 30, 1973	Macon, Georgia	This was a No Disqualification match.
Gorgeous George, Jr. and Bobby Shane	1	November 6, 1973	Macon, Georgia	
The title was vacated no later than March 1974 . Gorgeous George, Jr. and Bobby Shane made their last known defense of the title on December 11, 1973.
Jerry Lawler and Mr. Wrestling II (2)	1	March 3, 1974	Macon, Georgia	Won an eight-team one-night tournament.
Bob Armstrong (6) and Mr. Wrestling (2)	1	March 26, 1974	Macon, Georgia	
The title was vacated in May 1974 .
Ron and Terry Garvin	1	June 11, 1974	Macon, Georgia	Won an eight-team one-night tournament.
Tom Jones and Roberto Soto	1	September 24, 1974	Macon, Georgia	This was a No Disqualification match.
The Minnesota Wrecking Crew (Gene and Ole Anderson)	1	1974	Macon, Georgia	Records are unclear as to how they won the title.
Buddy Colt (5) and Harley Race	1	November 12, 1974	Macon, Georgia	
Rocky Johnson and Danny Little Bear	1	December 3, 1974	Macon, Georgia	
The Mighty Yankees	1	December 31, 1974	Macon, Georgia	
Robert Fuller and Jimmy Golden	1	January 21, 1975	Macon, Georgia	This was a No Disqualification match.
Ron Garvin (2) and Roger Kirby	1	February 4, 1975	Macon, Georgia	
Robert Fuller (2) and Don Muraco	1	February 18, 1975	Macon, Georgia	
Don Greene and Jerry Lawler (2)	1	March 9, 1975	Macon, Georgia	
Mr. Wrestling (2) and Mr. Wrestling II (3)	1	July 22, 1975	Macon, Georgia	Defeated Jerry Lawler and Bob Orton, Jr. in a No Disqualification match.
Bob Orton, Jr. and Dick Slater	1	July 29, 1975	Macon, Georgia	
The title was vacated in December 1975.
Luke Graham and Moondog Mayne	1	December 11, 1975	Macon, Georgia	Won an eight-team one-night tournament.
The title was retired no earlier than December 23, 1975, Luke Graham and Lonnie Mayne's last documented defense.
