= Georgia Championship Wrestling =

American professional wrestling promotion

- Acronym: GCW
- Founded: 1944; 2020 (revival)
- Defunct: 1984 (original promotion)
- Style: Rasslin'
- Headquarters: Atlanta, Georgia
- Founder: Paul Jones
- Owners: Paul Jones (1944–1974); Jim Barnett (1974–1983); Jack Brisco (1983–1984); Jerry Brisco (1983–1984); Ole Anderson (1983–1984); Vince McMahon (1984); Grady Odom (1990–2025); Sherry Odom Abbott (2025–present)
- Parent: Georgia Championship Wrestling, Inc. (original promotion)

Georgia Championship Wrestling is an American professional wrestling promotion based in Atlanta, Georgia. The promotion was affiliated with what had been the world's top sanctioning body of championship titles for decades before, the National Wrestling Alliance (NWA), and ran live wrestling shows throughout its geographic "territory" of Georgia. The company was also known for its self-titled TV program, which aired on Atlanta-based superstation WTBS from the 1970s until 1984 when its timeslot was purchased by the World Wrestling Federation.

== History ==
=== Early history ===
Georgia Championship Wrestling was formed in Atlanta in 1944 by promoter Paul Jones (retired wrestler Andrew Lutzi, not Paul Frederik who later was given the name) as ABC Booking. ABC held its matches at Atlanta's Municipal Auditorium on Friday evenings. Jones operated ABC for thirty years until his retirement in 1974, though from about 1970 until 1972 he was assisted by his booker Ray Gunkel. Jones was so infirm by this time (he died in 1988) that Gunkel effectively ran the promotion.

On December 25, 1971, Georgia Championship Wrestling made its television debut with a special Christmas program. Beginning in late January 1972 the promotion's regular series, Big Time Wrestling, began airing on Saturday afternoons on WQXI-TV in Atlanta; the show was recorded for later broadcast over WJBF in Augusta and WTOC-TV in Savannah, stations located in two of GCW's major cities. Big Time Wrestling was hosted by Ed Capral, and featured ring announcer Charlie Harben and referee Leo Garibaldi, and included interviews with wrestlers pertaining to their upcoming matches.

The promotion underwent some big changes in 1972. Firstly, it started promoting matches at the then-brand-new Omni Coliseum. Secondly, it switched its television outlet from its original home, then-ABC-affiliated WQXI-TV (now WXIA-TV) to UHF independent station WTCG, then owned by Ted Turner. WTCG would become a satellite-distributed superstation in 1976, and change its call letters to WTBS in 1979, ultimately becoming the national TBS cable channel.

=== Battle of Atlanta ===
The new television deal would be one of Gunkel's last decisions. Ray Gunkel died of a heart attack later that year after a match versus Ox Baker in Savannah, Georgia. The death set off some internal problems, with Ray's widow Ann, who had worked closely with Ray and expected to get her share of the promotion being shut out in favor of Bill Watts, with the promotion being renamed "Mid-South Sports". Ann Gunkel decided to start her own promotion outside of the National Wrestling Alliance, which she named the "All-South Wrestling Alliance".

Mid-South Sports's longterm prospects were not good at that point, most of their wrestlers had gone with Ann, and Ann's promotion had gotten Mid-South's television time slot, though both promotions aired on WTCG. (Ted Turner and Ann Gunkel had both attended Brown University and were rumored to be romantically involved.) After two years of strife, a trouble-shooter was called in: Jim Barnett, who had owned promotions in Indiana, Michigan, Ohio, Colorado and Australia. (The Australian promotion was called World Championship Wrestling.) At this point, Ann's promotion went downhill, being locked out of arena dates, with wrestlers defecting to Mid-South, and finally Ann Gunkel's All-South Wrestling Alliance folded in 1974.

=== Superstation ===
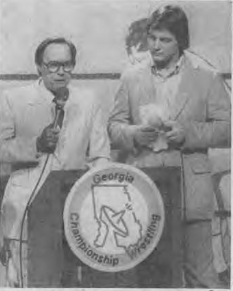
Gordon Solie (left) and Roddy Piper during a television taping of Georgia Championship Wrestling, c. 1982

When WTCG became distributed via satellite in 1976, the renamed Georgia Championship Wrestling became the first television program produced by an NWA-affiliated promotion to be broadcast nationally. This program was hosted by Gordon Solie and was recorded in the studios of WTCG in Midtown Atlanta. Shows were taped before a small (yet enthusiastic), live in-studio audience, as were most professional wrestling TV shows of that era. The show featured wrestling matches, plus melodramatic monologues and inter-character confrontations—similar to the programming offered by other territories, including the Northeast-based World Wrestling Federation (WWF, now WWE). GCW's main show, which aired on Saturday evenings, was complemented with a Sunday evening edition.

Many of the NWA's regional promoters were unhappy, but Barnett claimed since he was only using Georgia-based wrestlers, that there was no harm. Whether or not Barnett was in fact taking the promotion national is a matter of dispute. Some wrestlers, such as Roddy Piper, say that he was in fact doing so, but was prevented by fears of crossing organized crime figures involved with the sport. Throughout the 1970s, Georgia Championship Wrestling was one of the main shows that kept the Superstation alive.

In 1982, Georgia Championship Wrestling changed its main programming name to World Championship Wrestling at the request of Ted Turner. GCW also expanded its reach into parts of Ohio and Michigan which were considered "open territory" at the time. A January 1983 show in Dayton, Ohio, was the first show held in that city in five years.

A power struggle in late 1983 forced Barnett to sell most of his shares in GCW to a consortium consisting of wrestlers and brothers Jack Brisco and Gerald Brisco; Paul Jones; and Al Rogowski, a match booker, who also wrestled as Ole Anderson. This move set the stage for an important move in wrestling history, involving another regional promoter: Vince McMahon.

=== Black Saturday ===
In July 1984, the Brisco brothers sold their stock in GCW to McMahon for $900,000. In return McMahon received GCW's television time slots on WTBS, which McMahon then claimed for his WWF, which was in the midst of expanding into a national promotion. McMahon also guaranteed jobs with the WWF for the Briscos; Gerald Brisco remained with the WWF/WWE for decades before retiring in 2009. After working out a few prior commitments, Georgia Championship Wrestling ceased to exist.

GCW announcer Freddie Miller was the only member of the original GCW on-air cast who neither quit in protest nor was replaced by the new owner. McMahon had underestimated two major factors, however. The first was the differences in tastes between fanbases of different geographical regions. The WWF's style of wrestling sharply differed from that of GCW, with the WWF featuring cartoonish characters and storylines and squash matches and GCW featuring more athletic competition. Secondly, Southerners resented the symbolism of a "Yankee" company coming down from the North and "taking over" their wrestling.

In addition, WWF World Championship Wrestling was mainly used as a re-cap show, featuring matches which had previously aired on the WWF's main programming such as WWF Championship Wrestling and WWF All-Star Wrestling. This angered WTBS owner Ted Turner, who believed McMahon reneged on a promise to have live matches originating from Turner Broadcasting System's Atlanta studios.

=== After Black Saturday ===
As a result of dissatisfaction by the audience and Ted Turner himself with the WWF-produced series, which garnered lower ratings than previously, Turner began giving time slots to other southern wrestling promotions. Ole Anderson continued to operate on a smaller scale in the territory, promoting Championship Wrestling from Georgia out of Atlanta, which briefly aired on TBS Saturday mornings. Bill Watts' Mid-South Wrestling, which operated in Oklahoma, Arkansas, Louisiana, and Mississippi, was given the Sunday evening time slot previously used by GCW that the WWF did not take.

Eventually, on March 30, 1985, McMahon sold the Saturday night time slot to Jim Crockett Jr., a Charlotte, North Carolina–based promoter who ran NWA-branded shows in the Mid-Atlantic states. Jim Crockett Promotions took over production of the Saturday television show using the same set. JCP purchased Watts's promotion (by then renamed the Universal Wrestling Federation) in 1987. When JCP ran into financial difficulty, Turner Broadcasting took over the promotion in November 1988 to keep the programming on its network, naming the new subsidiary World Championship Wrestling (WCW) after the title of its then-flagship program.

In 2001, the WWF purchased the assets and trademarks belonging to WCW, including the entire tape libraries of GCW and JCP.

While the WWF purchased the tape library in 2001, the trademarks owned by businessman Grady Odom still remain active. Wrestler and promoter Chris Nelms took on an executive role in 2020 alongside Tim Rice, and GCW began holding events again across central Georgia, though Grady Odom remained as the promotion's owner until his death in 2025. The promotion has since been owned by Sherry Odom Abbott, Grady's sister.

== Championships ==
=== Current ===
- GCW Georgia Heavyweight Championship
- GCW Georgia Tag Team Championship

=== City ===
- NWA Columbus Heavyweight Championship
- NWA Columbus Tag Team Championship
- NWA Macon Heavyweight Championship
- NWA Macon Tag Team Championship

=== State ===
- NWA Georgia Heavyweight Championship
- NWA Georgia Junior Heavyweight Championship
- NWA Georgia Television Championship
- NWA Georgia Tag Team Championship

=== Southern ===
- NWA Southern Heavyweight Championship
- NWA Southern Tag Team Championship
- NWA Southern Women's Championship

=== National ===
- NWA National Heavyweight Championship
- NWA National Tag Team Championship
- NWA National Television Championship

=== International and World ===
- NWA International Tag Team Championship
- NWA World Junior Heavyweight Championship
- NWA World Tag Team Championship

== See also ==
- List of National Wrestling Alliance territories
- List of independent wrestling promotions in the United States
