= 2020 in professional wrestling =

2020 in professional wrestling describes the year's events in the world of professional wrestling.

The COVID-19 pandemic severely affected the professional wrestling industry worldwide in 2020. Many promotions cancelled or postponed booked events, with some being rescheduled for 2021. Other promotions, notably All Elite Wrestling (AEW) and WWE, instead held events behind closed doors. Other promotions began to follow suit as the year progressed. New Japan Pro-Wrestling (NJPW) was one of the first promotions to reintroduce live fans in the second half of the year with a limited capacity, followed by AEW.

== List of notable promotions ==
These promotions held notable events in 2020.

Promotion Name	Abbreviation	Notes
All Elite Wrestling	AEW	
All Japan Pro Wrestling	AJPW	
Consejo Mundial de Lucha Libre	CMLL	
CyberFight	CF	Founded in July by CyberAgent, CyberFight is an umbrella brand that oversees and promotes four individual promotions: DDT Pro-Wrestling (DDT), Ganbare☆Pro-Wrestling (GanPro), Pro Wrestling Noah (NOAH), and Tokyo Joshi Pro Wrestling (TJPW).
DDT Pro-Wrestling	DDT	The "DDT Pro-Wrestling" name has been solely used since 2004, but the DDT abbreviation had previously stood for the promotion's original name Dramatic Dream Team. In 2017, the promotion was purchased by CyberAgent. DDT then became part of a new umbrella brand titled CyberFight in July 2020.
Impact Wrestling	Impact	
International Wrestling Revolution Group	IWRG	
Lucha Libre AAA Worldwide	AAA	The "AAA" abbreviation has been used since the mid-1990s and had previously stood for the promotion's original name Asistencia Asesoría y Administración.
Major League Wrestling	MLW	
National Wrestling Alliance	NWA	
New Japan Pro-Wrestling	NJPW	
Pro Wrestling Noah	NOAH	In January, the promotion was purchased by CyberAgent. NOAH then became part of a new umbrella brand titled CyberFight in July.
Ring of Honor	ROH	
World Wonder Ring Stardom	Stardom	
WWE	—	WWE stands for World Wrestling Entertainment, which is still the legal name, but the company ceased using the full name in April 2011, with the WWE abbreviation becoming an orphaned initialism. WWE divided its roster into five storyline divisions – referred to as brands where wrestlers exclusively performed on their respective weekly television programs. Raw, SmackDown, and NXT were their three main brands, while NXT UK and 205 Live were specialty brands that were promoted under the NXT banner.

== Calendar of notable shows ==
=== January ===
Date	Promotion(s)	Event	Location	Main Event	Notes
1	AEW	Homecoming	Jacksonville, Florida	The Elite (Kenny Omega, Matt Jackson, and Nick Jackson) defeated Death Triangle (Pac, Pentagón Jr., and Rey Fénix) in a six-man tag team match	Aired as a special episode of Dynamite.
1	CMLL	Sin Piedad	Mexico City, Mexico	Dulce Gardenia defeated Kawato-San in a two out of three falls Lucha de Apuestas (hair versus hair)	
1	IWRG	Cinco Luchas en Jaula	Naucalpan, State of Mexico, Mexico	Demonio Infernal defeated Fuerza Guerrera Nueva Generacion, Pasion Cristal, Ave Rex, Emperador Azteca, El Hijo del Alebrije in a Steel cage match for the "Briefcase of Glory" and the vacant IWRG Intercontinental Middleweight Championship	
4	CMLL	El Ultimo Vuelo del Rey del Guaguanco	Mexico City, Mexico	Ángel de Oro, Atlantis Jr., Niebla Roja, and Shocker defeated El Felino, Gran Guerrero, Mephisto, and Rey Bucanero in a Best two-out-of-three falls eight-man tag team match	The first of two Mr. Niebla tribute shows held by CMLL.
4	NJPW	Wrestle Kingdom 14 in Tokyo Dome	Tokyo, Japan	Night 1: Kazuchika Okada (c) defeated Kota Ibushi to retain the IWGP Heavyweight Championship	First Tokyo Dome Show to take place over two nights. The second night (January 5) featured the retirement match for Jushin Thunder Liger.
5	NJPW	Wrestle Kingdom 14 in Tokyo Dome	Tokyo, Japan	Night 2: Tetsuya Naito (IWGP Intercontinental Champion) defeated Kazuchika Okada (IWGP Heavyweight Champion) in a Double Gold Dash match for both titles	First Tokyo Dome Show to take place over two nights. The second night (January 5) featured the retirement match for Jushin Thunder Liger.
6	NJPW	New Year Dash!!	Tokyo, Japan	Los Ingobernables de Japón (Tetsuya Naito and Sanada) defeated Bullet Club (Jay White and Kenta) in a tag team match	This event featured the retirement ceremony of Jushin Thunder Liger.
10	Impact	Bash at the Brewery 2	San Antonio, Texas, United States	Ohio Versus Everything (Dave Crist, Jake Crist, Madman Fulton, and Sami Callihan) defeated Brian Cage, Rich Swann, Tessa Blanchard, and Willie Mack in an Eight-person Tag team Elimination match	
10–20	CMLL; NJPW	Fantastica Mania	Japan	January 20: Carístico (c) defeated Bárbaro Cavernario to retain the NWA World Historic Middleweight Championship	
11	MLW	Zero Hour	North Richland Hills, Texas, United States	Mance Warner defeated Jimmy Havoc in a No Ropes Barbed Wire Match	
12	Impact	Hard To Kill	Dallas, Texas, United States	Tessa Blanchard defeated Sami Callihan (c) to win the Impact World Championship	With her win, Blanchard became the first woman to hold a men's world championship.
12	ROH	Honor Reigns Supreme	Concord, North Carolina, United States	La Facción Ingobernable (Dragon Lee, Kenny King, and Rush) defeated Villain Enterprises (Marty Scurll, Brody King, and PCO) in a six-man tag team match	
12	WWE: NXT UK	TakeOver: Blackpool II	Blackpool, Lancashire, England, United Kingdom	Walter (c) defeated Joe Coffey by submission to retain the WWE United Kingdom Championship	On January 17, the WWE United Kingdom Championship was renamed to NXT United Kingdom Championship.
15	AEW	Bash at the Beach	Coral Gables, Florida, United States	Pac defeated Darby Allin in a singles match	Aired as a special episode of Dynamite. Bash at the Beach was previously a World Championship Wrestling event that was acquired by WWE, who let the trademark expire in 2005. AEW Executive Vice President Cody then trademarked the name in March 2019.
19	Stardom	Stardom 9th Anniversary Show	Tokyo, Japan	Mayu Iwatani (c) defeated Momo Watanabe to retain the World of Stardom Championship	
20–24	AEW	Chris Jericho's Rock 'N' Wrestling Rager at Sea Part Deux: Second Wave	Miami, Florida, United States to Nassau, Bahamas	January 21: Jon Moxley defeated Pac to earn an AEW World Championship match at Revolution	Matches from the event on January 21 were taped and aired as an episode of Dynamite on January 22.
24	CMLL	La Noche de Mr. Niebla	Mexico City, Mexico	El Felino, Último Guerrero, and Diamante Azul defeated Carístico, Bárbaro Cavernario and Valiente by disqualification in a Relevos increíbles six-man tag team match	The second Mr. Niebla tribute show held by CMLL.
24	NWA	Hard Times	Atlanta, Georgia, United States	Ricky Starks defeated Trevor Murdoch in a tournament final match to become the new NWA World Television Champion	
25	WWE: NXT; NXT UK	Worlds Collide	Houston, Texas, United States	Imperium (Walter, Fabian Aichner, Marcel Barthel, and Alexander Wolfe) defeated The Undisputed Era (Adam Cole, Kyle O'Reilly, Bobby Fish, and Roderick Strong) in an eight-man tag team match	
26	WWE: Raw; SmackDown	Royal Rumble	Houston, Texas, United States	Drew McIntyre won the 30-man Royal Rumble match by last eliminating Roman Reigns to earn a world championship match at WrestleMania 36	Charlotte Flair won the women's Royal Rumble match and chose to challenge Rhea Ripley for the NXT Women's Championship at WrestleMania 36 (first time an NXT title was chosen by the Rumble winner). Drew McIntyre chose to challenge Brock Lesnar for the WWE Championship at WrestleMania 36.
27	WWE: Raw	Edge Appreciation Night	San Antonio, Texas, United States	Erick Rowan defeated Branden Vice in a singles match	Aired as a special episode of Raw, celebrating Edge's surprise return at the Royal Rumble the night before.
(c) – denotes defending champion(s)

=== February ===
Date	Promotion(s)	Event	Location	Main Event	Notes
1	MLW	Fightland	Philadelphia, Pennsylvania, United States	Davey Boy Smith Jr., The Von Erichs (Ross and Marshall Von Erich), and Killer Kross defeated Team Filthy (Tom Lawlor, Dominic Garrini, Erick Stevens, and Kit Osbourne) in an eight-man tag team match	
1	NJPW	The New Beginning in Sapporo	Sapporo, Japan	Shingo Takagi defeated Hirooki Goto (c) to win the NEVER Openweight Championship	
2	NJPW	The New Beginning in Sapporo	Sapporo, Japan	Kazuchika Okada defeated Taichi in a singles match	
8	Stardom	Stardom The Way To Major League	Tokyo, Japan	Takumi Iroha defeated Mayu Iwatani	
9	ROH	Free Enterprise	Baltimore, Maryland, United States	Villain Enterprises (PCO and Marty Scurll) defeated Rush and Nick Aldis in a tag team match	
9	NJPW	The New Beginning in Osaka	Osaka, Japan	Tetsuya Naito (c) defeated Kenta to retain the IWGP Heavyweight Championship and the IWGP Intercontinental Championship	
16	WWE: NXT	TakeOver: Portland	Portland, Oregon, United States	Adam Cole (c) defeated Tommaso Ciampa to retain the NXT Championship	
22	Impact	Sacrifice	Louisville, Kentucky, United States	Tessa Blanchard (Impact World Champion) defeated Ace Austin (Impact X Division Champion) in a Champion vs. Champion non-title singles match	
23	DDT	Into The Fight	Tokyo, Japan	Masato Tanaka (c) defeated Mao to retain the KO-D Openweight Championship	
27	WWE: Raw; SmackDown	Super ShowDown	Riyadh, Saudi Arabia	Goldberg defeated "The Fiend" Bray Wyatt (c) to win the WWE Universal Championship	First time a women's championship (the SmackDown Women's Championship) was defended in the country. With Goldberg's win, he became the first wrestler to win a world championship after being inducted into the WWE Hall of Fame.
28	WWE: SmackDown	John Cena Appreciation Night	Boston, Massachusetts, United States	The Usos (Jey Uso and Jimmy Uso) defeated The Miz and John Morrison in a tag team match	Aired as a special episode of SmackDown.
28	ROH	Bound By Honor	Nashville, Tennessee, United States	PCO (c) defeated Dragon Lee to retain the ROH World Championship	
29	ROH	Gateway to Honor	St. Charles, Missouri, United States	Rush defeated PCO (c) and Mark Haskins to win the ROH World Championship	
29	AEW	Revolution	Chicago, Illinois, United States	Jon Moxley defeated Chris Jericho (c) to win the AEW World Championship	
(c) – denotes defending champion(s)

=== March ===
Date	Promotion(s)	Event	Location	Main Event	Notes
8	WWE: Raw; SmackDown	Elimination Chamber	Philadelphia, Pennsylvania, United States	Shayna Baszler defeated Natalya, Liv Morgan, Asuka, Ruby Riott, and Sarah Logan in an Elimination Chamber match to earn a WWE Raw Women's Championship match at WrestleMania 36	
13	AAA; MLW	AAA vs MLW	Tijuana, Baja California, Mexico	La Familia Real (L.A. Park, El Hijo de L.A. Park, and L.A. Park Jr.) defeated Psycho Clown, Nicho el Millonario, and Niño Hamburguesa in a No Disqualification trios match	AAA and MLW's first co-promoted event.
16	WWE: Raw	3:16 Day	Orlando, Florida, United States	Rey Mysterio defeated Andrade in a singles match	Aired as a special episode of Raw, celebrating 3:16 Day for Stone Cold Steve Austin. This show was originally scheduled to be held in Pittsburgh, Pennsylvania, but had to be moved due to the COVID-19 pandemic.
20	DDT	Judgement 2020: DDT 23rd Anniversary	Tokyo, Japan	Masato Tanaka (c) defeated Konosuke Takeshita to retain the KO-D Openweight Championship	
23	WWE: Raw	Raw 1400	Orlando, Florida, United States	Aleister Black defeated Leon Ruff in a singles match	Aired as a special episode of Raw, marking the 1400th episode of Raw. This show was originally scheduled to be held in Fort Worth, Texas, but had to be moved due to the COVID-19 pandemic.
24	Stardom	Stardom Cinderella Tournament 2020	Tokyo, Japan	Giulia defeated Natsuko Tora in the 2020 Cinderella Tournament finals	
25	WWE: Raw; SmackDown; NXT	WrestleMania 36	Orlando, Florida, United States	Part 1 (aired April 4): The Undertaker defeated AJ Styles in a Boneyard match	This event was originally scheduled to take place in Tampa, Florida, solely on April 5 and to air live, but it was moved to the WWE Performance Center in Orlando due to the COVID-19 pandemic. The date of the event was also moved up and it aired on tape delay on April 4 and 5. This was the first WrestleMania to be done over two nights, the first to be held without a live audience, the first to air on tape delay, and the first to promote the NXT brand, subsequently also being the first in which an NXT championship (the NXT Women's Championship) was defended at the event. The event also featured The Undertaker's final match.
26	WWE: Raw; SmackDown; NXT	WrestleMania 36	Orlando, Florida, United States	Part 2 (aired April 5): Drew McIntyre defeated Brock Lesnar (c) to win the WWE Championship	
(c) – denotes defending champion(s)

=== April ===
Date	Promotion(s)	Event	Location	Main Event	Notes
8–10	Impact	Rebellion	Nashville, Tennessee, United States	Part 1 (aired April 21): Ken Shamrock defeated Sami Callihan by technical submission in an unsanctioned match	This event was originally scheduled to air live on pay-per-view from New York City on April 19, but it was rescheduled and moved to a closed set at Skyway Studios in Nashville due to the COVID-19 pandemic. The event aired on tape delay as a two-part special of Impact!
8–10	Impact	Rebellion	Nashville, Tennessee, United States	Part 2 (aired April 28): Moose defeated Hernandez and Michael Elgin in a three-way match	This event was originally scheduled to air live on pay-per-view from New York City on April 19, but it was rescheduled and moved to a closed set at Skyway Studios in Nashville due to the COVID-19 pandemic. The event aired on tape delay as a two-part special of Impact!
(c) – denotes defending champion(s)

=== May ===
Date	Promotion(s)	Event	Location	Main event	Notes
10	WWE: Raw; SmackDown	Money in the Bank	Orlando, Florida; Stamford, Connecticut, United States	Asuka defeated Carmella, Shayna Baszler, Dana Brooke, Lacey Evans, and Nia Jax in the women's Money in the Bank ladder match to win the WWE Raw Women's Championship (Note: The match was originally announced with its normal rules in which the winner would receive a women's championship match contract, but on the May 11 episode of Raw, Raw Women's Champion Becky Lynch revealed that she was going on hiatus due to pregnancy and that the ladder match was actually for the title.) Otis defeated Aleister Black, Daniel Bryan, King Corbin, AJ Styles, and Rey Mysterio in the men's Money in the Bank ladder match to earn a world championship match contract The men's and women's ladder matches happened at the same time, though the women's match concluded first.	This event was originally scheduled to take place in Baltimore, Maryland, but it was moved due to the COVID-19 pandemic. Most of the matches took place live at the WWE Performance Center in Orlando, while the event's two eponymous matches were pre-recorded at WWE's global headquarters in Stamford on April 15.
23	AEW	Double or Nothing	Jacksonville, Florida, United States	Matt Hardy and The Elite (Adam Page, Kenny Omega, Matt Jackson and Nick Jackson) defeated The Inner Circle (Chris Jericho, Jake Hager, Sammy Guevara, Santana and Ortiz) in a Stadium Stampede match	This event was originally scheduled to take place in Paradise, Nevada, but it was moved to the Jacksonville Jaguars complex due to the COVID-19 pandemic. Most of the matches took place live at Daily's Place, while the main event Stadium Stampede match was pre-recorded at the TIAA Bank Field stadium; recording began the night of May 22 and ended early morning of May 23. First event to feature the AEW TNT Championship.
(c) – denotes defending champion(s)

=== June ===
Date	Promotion(s)	Event	Location	Main event	Notes
6	DDT	Wrestle Peter Pan	Tokyo, Japan	Konosuke Takeshita defeated Yoshihiko in a Last Man Standing match	First Peter Pan event to take place over two nights.
7	DDT	Wrestle Peter Pan	Tokyo, Japan	Tetsuya Endo defeated Masato Tanaka (c) to win the KO-D Openweight Championship	First Peter Pan event to take place over two nights.
7	WWE: NXT	TakeOver: In Your House	Winter Park, Florida, United States	Io Shirai defeated Charlotte Flair (c) and Rhea Ripley to win the NXT Women's Championship	First In Your House-branded event since 1999. First WWE Network event to be announced following the start of the COVID-19 pandemic. Most of the matches took place live from Full Sail University, while the Backlot Brawl was pre-recorded on May 28 in the parking lot of Full Sail.
14	WWE: Raw; SmackDown	Backlash	Orlando, Florida, United States	Randy Orton defeated Edge in a singles match	This event was originally scheduled to take place in Kansas City, Missouri, but it was moved to the WWE Performance Center in Orlando due to the COVID-19 pandemic. It was the first WWE pay-per-view event announced following the start of the pandemic. Most of the matches took place live, while the main event was pre-recorded on June 7.
22	WWE: Raw	Championship Monday	Orlando, Florida, United States	Apollo Crews (c) defeated Shelton Benjamin to retain the WWE United States Championship	Aired as a special episode of Raw.
26	WWE: SmackDown	Tribute to The Undertaker	Orlando, Florida, United States	Jeff Hardy defeated King Corbin in a singles match	Aired as a special episode of SmackDown, paying tribute to The Undertaker's career.
(c) – denotes defending champion(s)

=== July ===
Date	Promotion(s)	Event	Location	Main event	Notes
1	WWE: NXT	The Great American Bash	Winter Park, Florida, United States	Night 1: Io Shirai defeated Sasha Banks (with Bayley) in a singles match	First The Great American Bash-branded event since 2012. The event aired as a two-part special of NXT; the event was pre-recorded during the day on July 1—the first part aired that night with the second on July 8.
1	WWE: NXT	The Great American Bash	Winter Park, Florida, United States	Night 2 (aired July 8): Keith Lee (NXT North American Champion) defeated Adam Cole (NXT Champion) in a Winner Takes All match	First The Great American Bash-branded event since 2012. The event aired as a two-part special of NXT; the event was pre-recorded during the day on July 1—the first part aired that night with the second on July 8.
1	AEW	Fyter Fest	Jacksonville, Florida, United States	Night 1: Kenny Omega and Adam Page (c) defeated Best Friends (Chuck Taylor and Trent) to retain the AEW World Tag Team Championship	This event was originally scheduled to be broadcast on PPV from Wembley Arena in London, England, and be AEW's United Kingdom debut, but was moved due to the COVID-19 pandemic. The event instead aired as a two-part special of Dynamite. Night 1 aired live, while Night 2 was pre-recorded on July 2 and aired on July 8. AEW invited sponsors of the venue who could also invite friends and family to attend the event as part of an experiment towards returning to live ticketed spectators.
2	AEW	Fyter Fest	Jacksonville, Florida, United States	Night 2 (aired July 8): Chris Jericho defeated Orange Cassidy in a singles match	This event was originally scheduled to be broadcast on PPV from Wembley Arena in London, England, and be AEW's United Kingdom debut, but was moved due to the COVID-19 pandemic. The event instead aired as a two-part special of Dynamite. Night 1 aired live, while Night 2 was pre-recorded on July 2 and aired on July 8. AEW invited sponsors of the venue who could also invite friends and family to attend the event as part of an experiment towards returning to live ticketed spectators.
12	NJPW	Dominion in Osaka-jo Hall	Osaka, Japan	Evil (New Japan Cup winner) defeated Tetsuya Naito (c) to win the IWGP Heavyweight Championship and IWGP Intercontinental Championships	This event was originally scheduled to take place on June 14, but was postponed to allow the New Japan Cup tournament to take place, as the tournament was originally cancelled earlier in the year due to the COVID-19 pandemic.
15	AEW	Fight for the Fallen	Jacksonville, Florida, United States	Jon Moxley (c) defeated Brian Cage by technical submission to retain the AEW World Championship	Aired as a special episode of Dynamite.
18	Impact	Slammiversary XVIII	Nashville, Tennessee, United States	Eddie Edwards defeated Ace Austin, Trey, Rich Swann, and Eric Young in a Fatal five-way elimination match to win the vacant Impact World Championship	
19	WWE: Raw; SmackDown	The Horror Show at Extreme Rules	Orlando, Florida, United States	Bray Wyatt defeated Braun Strowman in a Wyatt Swamp Fight	This event was originally scheduled to take place in San Jose, California, but was moved due to the COVID-19 pandemic. Most of the matches took place live at the WWE Performance Center, while the main event Wyatt Swamp Fight was pre-recorded at an undisclosed location about two hours outside of Orlando; recording began the night of July 16 and ended early morning of July 17. First Extreme Rules event to have an altered title. Final WWE PPV held at the Performance Center during the pandemic.
25	NJPW	Sengoku Lord in Nagoya	Nagoya, Japan	Evil (c) defeated Hiromu Takahashi to retain the IWGP Heavyweight Championship and IWGP Intercontinental Championship	
(c) – denotes defending champion(s)

=== August ===
Date	Promotion(s)	Event	Location	Main Event	Notes
12	AEW	Tag Team Appreciation Night	Jacksonville, Florida, United States	Orange Cassidy defeated Chris Jericho in a singles match	Aired as a special episode of Dynamite.
14	Impact	Emergence	Nashville, Tennessee, United States	Part 1 (aired August 18): The Motor City Machine Guns (Chris Sabin and Alex Shelley) (c) defeated The North (Ethan Page and Josh Alexander) to retain the Impact World Tag Team Championship	Aired on tape delay as a two-part special of Impact!.
14	Impact	Emergence	Nashville, Tennessee, United States	Part 2 (aired August 25): Deonna Purrazzo (c) defeated Jordynne Grace in a 30-minute Ironman match to retain the Impact Knockouts Championship	Aired on tape delay as a two-part special of Impact!.
22	AEW	Saturday Night Dynamite	Jacksonville, Florida, United States	Mr. Brodie Lee defeated Cody (c) to win the AEW TNT Championship	Aired as a special episode of Dynamite.
22	WWE: NXT	TakeOver XXX	Winter Park, Florida, United States	Karrion Kross defeated Keith Lee (c) to win the NXT Championship	The event making debut Pat McAfee as wrestler.
22	WWE: NXT	TakeOver XXX	Winter Park, Florida, United States	Karrion Kross defeated Keith Lee (c) to win the NXT Championship	TakeOver and SummerSlam were both originally scheduled to take place at the TD Garden in Boston, Massachusetts, but were moved due to the COVID-19 pandemic. TakeOver was moved to Full Sail University in Winter Park, while SummerSlam was moved to the Amway Center in Orlando, making it WWE's first PPV to be held outside of the WWE Performance Center since March; broadcasts of Raw, SmackDown, and PPVs were held at the Amway Center until December 2020. SummerSlam was subsequently the first WWE PPV to be presented in the WWE ThunderDome, a new virtual fan viewing experience.
23	WWE: Raw; SmackDown	SummerSlam	Orlando, Florida, United States	"The Fiend" Bray Wyatt defeated Braun Strowman (c) in a Falls Count Anywhere match to win the WWE Universal Championship	
23	WWE: Raw; SmackDown	SummerSlam	Orlando, Florida, United States	"The Fiend" Bray Wyatt defeated Braun Strowman (c) in a Falls Count Anywhere match to win the WWE Universal Championship	The event making debut Dominik Mysterio as wrestler. The event featuring return of Roman Reigns.
27	AEW	Thursday Night Dynamite	Jacksonville, Florida, United States	Sammy Guevara defeated Matt Hardy in a Tables match	First major wrestling to show to have ticketed fans during the COVID-19 pandemic, though to a limited capacity (10–15% capacity of Daily's Place). Aired as a special episode of Dynamite.
29	NJPW	Summer Struggle in Jingu	Tokyo, Japan	Tetsuya Naito defeated Evil (c) to win the IWGP Heavyweight Championship and IWGP Intercontinental Championship	
30	WWE: Raw; SmackDown	Payback	Orlando, Florida, United States	Roman Reigns defeated "The Fiend" Bray Wyatt (c) and Braun Strowman in a No Holds Barred Triple Threat match to win the WWE Universal Championship	First Payback event since 2017.
(c) – denotes defending champion(s)

=== September ===
Date	Promotion(s)	Event	Location	Main Event	Notes
1	WWE: NXT	Super Tuesday	Winter Park, Florida, United States	Finn Bálor and Adam Cole tied two falls each in a 60-minute fatal four-way iron man match, also involving Tommaso Ciampa and Johnny Gargano, for the vacant NXT Championship	The first part of a two-week special Tuesday event due to NHL playoff hockey on USA Network in NXT's normal Wednesday time slot.
4	NJPW	Fighting Spirit Unleashed; Week 1	Port Hueneme, California, United States	Jay White defeated Flip Gordon in a singles match	The first part of a two-week event, promoted as part of New Japan Pro-Wrestling of America's weekly TV show, NJPW Strong.
5	AEW	All Out	Jacksonville, Florida, United States	Jon Moxley (c) defeated MJF to retain the AEW World Championship	This event was originally scheduled to take place in Hoffman Estates, Illinois, but was moved to Daily's Place in Jacksonville due to the COVID-19 pandemic.
8	WWE: NXT	Super Tuesday II	Winter Park, Florida, United States	Finn Bálor defeated Adam Cole to win the vacant NXT Championship	The second part of a two-week special Tuesday event due to NHL playoff hockey on USA Network in NXT's normal Wednesday time slot.
11	NJPW	Fighting Spirit Unleashed; Week 2	Port Hueneme, California, United States	Kenta (c) defeated Jeff Cobb for the IWGP United States Championship challenge rights certificate	The second part of a two-week event, promoted as part of New Japan Pro-Wrestling of America's weekly TV show, NJPW Strong.
14	WWE: Raw	In Your Face	Orlando, Florida, United States	Drew McIntyre vs. Keith Lee ended in a no contest	Aired as a special episode of Raw.
22	AEW	Late Night Dynamite	Jacksonville, Florida, United States	Shawn Spears defeated Matt Sydal in a singles match	Aired as a special episode of Dynamite.
25	CMLL	87th Anniversary Show	Mexico City, Mexico	La Alianza de Plata y Oro (Carístico and Místico) (c) defeated AtrapaSueños (Rey Cometa and Espíritu Negro) to retain the CMLL World Tag Team Championship	
27	WWE: Raw; SmackDown	Clash of Champions	Orlando, Florida, United States	Roman Reigns (c) defeated Jey Uso to retain the WWE Universal Championship	This event was originally scheduled to take place in Newark, New Jersey, on September 20, but was moved and pushed back due to the COVID-19 pandemic.
(c) – denotes defending champion(s)

=== October ===
Date	Promotion(s)	Event	Location	Main Event	Notes
3	Impact	Victory Road	Nashville, Tennessee, United States	Eric Young (c) defeated Eddie Edwards to retain the Impact World Championship	
3	Stardom	Stardom Yokohama Cinderella 2020	Yokohama, Japan	Mayu Iwatani (c) defeated Syuri to retain the World of Stardom Championship	
4	WWE: NXT	TakeOver 31	Orlando, Florida, United States	Finn Bálor (c) defeated Kyle O'Reilly to retain the NXT Championship	First NXT event to be presented inside the "Capitol Wrestling Center," an homage to the Capitol Wrestling Corporation, the predecessor to WWE; the Capitol Wrestling Center is hosted at the WWE Performance Center and is NXT's version of the ThunderDome used for Raw and SmackDown, but with a small live crowd included with all future NXT shows held here until further notice. This was also the first TakeOver event to air on traditional PPV in addition to the WWE Network.
5	AJPW	Champion Carnival Final	Tokyo, Japan	Zeus defeated Kento Miyahara to win the Champion Carnival tournament final	
7	AEW	Chris Jericho's 30th Anniversary Celebration	Jacksonville, Florida, United States	The Inner Circle (Chris Jericho and Jake Hager) defeated The Chaos Project (Luther and Serpentico) in a tag team match	Aired as a special episode of Dynamite. This event had the final match of Mr. Brodie Lee, who died on December 26.
9	WWE: Raw; SmackDown	2020 WWE Draft; Night 1	Orlando, Florida, United States	"The Fiend" Bray Wyatt defeated Kevin Owens in a singles match	Aired as a special episode of SmackDown.
11	CF: NOAH	N-1 Victory Final	Osaka, Japan	Katsuhiko Nakajima defeated Kaito Kiyomiya to win the N-1 Victory tournament final	NOAH's first major event to be promoted under CF.
12	WWE: Raw; SmackDown	2020 WWE Draft; Night 2	Orlando, Florida, United States	Lana won a 13-woman dual branded battle royal by last eliminating Natalya to earn a WWE Raw Women's Championship match on the following week's episode of Raw	Aired as a special episode of Raw.
14	AEW	Dynamite One Year Anniversary Show	Jacksonville, Florida, United States	Jon Moxley (c) defeated Lance Archer to retain the AEW World Championship	Aired as a special episode of Dynamite.
16	WWE: SmackDown	Fox Season 2 Premiere	Orlando, Florida, United States	Roman Reigns (c) defeated Braun Strowman to retain the WWE Universal Championship	Aired as a special episode of SmackDown.
18	NJPW	G1 Climax 30 Final	Tokyo, Japan	Kota Ibushi defeated Sanada to win the G1 Climax tournament final	
19	WWE: Raw	2020–21 Season Premiere	Orlando, Florida, United States	Braun Strowman defeated Keith Lee in a singles match	Aired as a special episode of Raw.
24	Impact	Bound for Glory	Nashville, Tennessee, United States	Rich Swann defeated Eric Young (c) to win the Impact World Championship	
25	WWE: Raw; SmackDown	Hell in a Cell	Orlando, Florida, United States	Randy Orton defeated Drew McIntyre (c) in a Hell in a Cell match to win the WWE Championship	This event was originally scheduled to occur on November 1, but was moved up as WWE's initial contract with the Amway Center expired on October 31.
28	WWE: NXT	Halloween Havoc	Orlando, Florida, United States	Io Shirai (c) defeated Candice LeRae in a Tables, Ladders and Scares match to retain the NXT Women's Championship	First Halloween Havoc-branded event since 2000 and the first under the WWE banner; the event was previously an annual World Championship Wrestling (WCW) pay-per-view until WWE purchased WCW in 2001. Aired as a special episode of NXT.
30	CMLL	Día de Muertos	Mexico City, Mexico	El Terrible defeated Euforia to win CMLL Rey del Inframundo Championship	
31	ROH	Pure Tournament Final	Baltimore, Maryland, United States	Jonathan Gresham defeated Tracy Williams to win the revived ROH Pure Championship	Match took place on August 23, 2020, but aired on tape delay on October 31.
(c) – denotes defending champion(s)

=== November ===
Date	Promotion(s)	Event	Location	Main event	Notes
3	CF: DDT	Ultimate Party	Tokyo, Japan	Tetsuya Endo (c) defeated Daisuke Sasaki to retain the KO-D Openweight Championship	DDT's first major event to be promoted under CF.
7	NJPW	Power Struggle	Osaka, Japan	Tetsuya Naito (c) defeated Evil to retain the IWGP Heavyweight Championship and IWGP Intercontinental Championship	
7	AEW	Full Gear	Jacksonville, Florida, United States	Jon Moxley (c) defeated Eddie Kingston in an "I quit" match to retain the AEW World Championship	
11	CF: TJPW	Wrestle Princess I	Tokyo, Japan	Yuka Sakazaki (c) defeated Mizuki to retain the Princess of Princess Championship	TJPW's first Wrestle Princess event
14	Impact	Turning Point	Nashville, Tennessee, United States	Rich Swann (c) defeated Sami Callihan to retain the Impact World Championship	
22	WWE: Raw; SmackDown	Survivor Series	Orlando, Florida, United States	Roman Reigns (SmackDown's Universal Champion) defeated Drew McIntyre (Raw's WWE Champion) in a Champion vs. Champion non-title singles match	This event featured the retirement ceremony of The Undertaker. Final WWE PPV held at the Amway Center during the COVID-19 pandemic.
27	CMLL	Leyenda de Azul	Mexico City, Mexico	Ultimo Guerrero (c) defeated Euforia to retain the CMLL World Heavyweight Championship	This event aired live on TicketMaster Live from Arena Mexico with no fans in attendance.
(c) – denotes defending champion(s)

=== December ===
Date	Promotion(s)	Event	Location	Main event	Notes
2	AEW	Winter Is Coming	Jacksonville, Florida, United States	Kenny Omega defeated Jon Moxley (c) to win the AEW World Championship	Aired as a special episode of Dynamite. This event featured the debut of Sting in AEW, which was his first appearance on TNT in over 19 years; his last appearance was on the final episode of WCW Monday Nitro on March 26, 2001.
6	WWE: Raw; SmackDown	Tribute to the Troops	Orlando, Florida, United States	Drew McIntyre defeated The Miz in a singles match	Aired midday on FOX adjacent to the NFL broadcasts. The following night's episode of Raw was WWE's final show broadcast from the Amway Center during the COVID-19 pandemic as the ThunderDome was relocated to Tropicana Field in St. Petersburg, Florida, which began with the December 11 episode of SmackDown. WWE remained at Tropicana Field until April 2021.
6	WWE: NXT	TakeOver: WarGames	Orlando, Florida, United States	The Undisputed Era (Adam Cole, Kyle O'Reilly, Roderick Strong, and Bobby Fish) defeated Team McAfee (Pat McAfee, Pete Dunne, Danny Burch, and Oney Lorcan) in a WarGames match	
11	NJPW	World Tag League and Best of the Super Juniors 2020 Finals	Tokyo, Japan	Hiromu Takahashi defeated El Desperado to win the Best of the Super Juniors tournament final	
11	NJPW	Detonation; Week 1	Port Hueneme, California, United States	Jay White defeated Karl Fredericks in a singles match	The first part of a two-week event, promoted as part of New Japan Pro-Wrestling of America's weekly TV show, NJPW Strong.
12	NJPW	Super J-Cup	Port Hueneme, California, United States	El Phantasmo defeated A. C. H. to win the Super J-Cup tournament final	
12	Impact	Final Resolution	Nashville, Tennessee, United States	Rich Swann (c) defeated Chris Bey to retain the Impact World Championship	
12	AAA	Triplemanía XXVIII	Azcapotzalco, Mexico City, Mexico	Pagano defeated Chessman in a Lucha de Apuestas Hair vs. Hair match	This event was originally scheduled to take place on August 22, but was postponed due to the COVID-19 pandemic and was held behind closed doors.
18	NJPW	Detonation; Week 2	Port Hueneme, California, United States	Kenta (c) defeated Brody King to retain the IWGP United States Championship challenge rights certificate	The second part of a two-week event, promoted as part of New Japan Pro-Wrestling of America's weekly TV show, NJPW Strong.
18	ROH	Final Battle	Baltimore, Maryland, United States	Rush (c) defeated Brody King to retain the ROH World Championship	
20	Stardom	Osaka Dream Cinderella 2020	Yokohama, Japan	Utami Hayashishita (c) defeated Momo Watanabe to retain the World of Stardom Championship	
20	WWE: Raw; SmackDown	TLC: Tables, Ladders & Chairs	St. Petersburg, Florida, United States	Randy Orton defeated "The Fiend" Bray Wyatt in a Firefly Inferno match	First WWE PPV held at Tropicana Field during the COVID-19 pandemic.
22	WWE: SmackDown	Christmas Day SmackDown	St. Petersburg, Florida, United States	Big E defeated Sami Zayn (c) in a lumberjack match to win the WWE Intercontinental Championship	Aired on tape delay on December 25 as a special episode of SmackDown.
23	MLW	Opera Cup Final	Orlando, Florida, United States	Tom Lawlor defeated Low Ki to win the Opera Cup tournament final	
23	AEW	Holiday Bash	Jacksonville, Florida, United States	The Young Bucks (Matt Jackson and Nick Jackson) (c) defeated The Acclaimed (Anthony Bowens and Max Caster) to retain the AEW World Tag Team Championship	Aired as a special episode of Dynamite.
23	WWE: NXT	A Very Gargano Christmas	Orlando, Florida, United States	Adam Cole defeated Velveteen Dream in a singles match	Aired as a special episode of NXT.
30	AEW	Brodie Lee Celebration of Life	Jacksonville, Florida, United States	Cody Rhodes, Orange Cassidy, and Preston "10" Vance defeated Team Taz (Brian Cage, Ricky Starks, and Powerhouse Hobbs) in a six-man tag team match	A tribute show to Mr. Brodie Lee, who was an active member of the roster and leader of The Dark Order who died on December 26 at the age of 41. Aired as a special episode of Dynamite.
(c) – denotes defending champion(s)

=== Shows affected by COVID-19 ===
Due to the COVID-19 pandemic, many promotions canceled or postponed their events. Others, such as WWE and AEW, began presenting empty arena shows. WWE began this with the March 13 episode of SmackDown, airing the show from the WWE Performance Center in Orlando, Florida. Their following episodes of 205 Live and Monday Night Raw were also broadcast from the Performance Center; WrestleMania 36 and subsequent pay-per-views were also held at this venue until August. NXT broadcasts continued to be held at NXT's home base of Full Sail University in Winter Park, Florida, but also behind closed doors. AEW began this format with the March 18 episode of Dynamite, as well as that day's tapings for Dark, broadcasting from Daily's Place in Jacksonville, Florida, though after a couple of weeks at this venue, they moved to The Nightmare Factory, AEW's de facto training facility in Norcross, Georgia, though shows returned to Daily's Place in May. Since AEW's first broadcast under this format, they used their wrestlers and other employees to serve as the live audience in place of fans for matches in which the wrestlers were not performing. WWE similarly began doing this starting with the May 25 broadcast of Raw, using their Performance Center trainees as the live audience; the promotion further expanded this to friends and family members of wrestlers, beginning with the June 15 episode of Raw. Impact Wrestling began doing shows behind closed doors in April.

AEW then invited 60 selected fans (who were sponsors of the venue who could also invite friends and family) to their Fyter Fest event in July, following COVID-19 protocols, becoming the first to have fans, albeit select ones, to attend a professional wrestling event since the start of the pandemic. Beginning with the August 21 episode of SmackDown, WWE changed venues, with all future broadcasts of Raw, SmackDown, 205 Live, and PPVs being held in a bio-secure bubble called the WWE ThunderDome. WWE had nearly 1,000 LED boards to allow for rows and rows of fans to attend virtually for free—the ThunderDome was initially hosted at Orlando's Amway Center before moving to Tropicana Field in St. Petersburg, Florida, in December (and then the Yuengling Center in Tampa, Florida, in April 2021). In October, WWE moved NXT's shows, along with 205 Live, to the WWE Performance Center, which was redone as the Capitol Wrestling Center, NXT's version of the ThunderDome, though with a select few live fans also in attendance—the name was also an homage to WWE's predecessor, the Capitol Wrestling Corporation. In following COVID-19 guidelines, AEW became the first promotion to sell tickets for shows, but only to a 10–15% capacity of the Daily's Place venue. Fans were required to wear masks for the entirety of the shows with friends and families placed in their own pods distanced from other fans; the fans were also placed in the upper seating area of the open air venue. This began with the August 27 episode of Dynamite.

==== Events postponed to 2021 ====
Original date	Promotion(s)	Event	Original location	Notes
March 20	CMLL	Homenaje a Dos Leyendas	Mexico City, Mexico	The event was scheduled to be held on March 20 but was moved to September 17, 2021, due to the COVID-19 pandemic.
March 21	AAA	Rey de Reyes	Merida, Yucatan, Mexico	The event was scheduled to be held on March 21 but was moved to May 1, 2021, in San Pedro Cholula, Puebla, due to the COVID-19 pandemic.
October 10	AAA	Triplemanía Regia II	Monterrey, Mexico	The event was scheduled to be held on October 10 but was moved to December 4, 2021, due to the COVID-19 pandemic.

==== Canceled events ====
The following events were canceled and not rescheduled as a result of the COVID-19 pandemic.

Scheduled date	Promotion(s)	Event	Location	Notes
March 13	ROH	18th Anniversary Show	Sunrise Manor, Nevada, United States	
March 14	ROH	Past vs. Present	Sunrise Manor, Nevada, United States	
March 28	Impact	Lockdown	Windsor, Ontario, Canada	
March 29	PWG	Kobe	Los Angeles, California, United States	The event was scheduled to be held in tribute to NBA star Kobe Bryant, who had died in a helicopter crash on January 26.
March 31	NJPW	Sakura Genesis	Tokyo, Japan	
April 3	Impact	TNA: There's No Place Like Home	Tampa, Florida, United States	This would have been a Total Nonstop Action Wrestling (TNA) reunion show.
April 4	ROH	Supercard of Honor XIV	Lakeland, Florida, United States	
April 4	WWE: NXT	TakeOver: Tampa Bay	Tampa, Florida, United States	Matches scheduled and planned for the event were moved to weekly episodes of NXT beginning April 1.
April 10–11	ROH	Pure Excellence	Columbus, Ohio, United States	Originally meant to host the ROH Pure Tournament for the reactivated ROH Pure Championship
April 19	NWA	Crockett Cup	Atlanta, Georgia, United States	
April 23	ROH	Battlestar	New York, New York, United States	
April 24	ROH	Quest For Gold	Philadelphia, Pennsylvania, United States	Supposed to host a 16-woman tournament to crown the inaugural ROH Women's World Champion (the first women's champion in ROH since Kelly Klein, whose Women of Honor World Championship was retired after her firing)
May 3–4	NJPW	Wrestling Dontaku	Fukuoka, Japan	
May 6	Dragon Gate	Dead or Alive	Nagoya, Japan	
June 19	ROH	Best in the World	Baltimore, Maryland, United States	

== Notable events ==
- February 27 – At WWE's Super ShowDown pay-per-view, the WWE SmackDown Women's Championship became the first women's championship to be defended in Saudi Arabia when Bayley defended the title against Naomi (which was only the second women's match contested in the country).
- March 13 – WWE SmackDown is the first major wrestling show produced behind closed doors at the onset of the COVID-19 pandemic.
- March 25–26 – WWE's WrestleMania 36, originally scheduled to be held live in April, is the first major pay-per-view event produced behind closed doors as a result of the COVID-19 pandemic. This would also be the only WrestleMania to be held without fans and air on tape delay, broadcast on April 4 and 5.
- June 17 – Independent wrestler David Starr was accused of sexual assault, sparking the Speaking Out movement in which several sex crime accusations were made against numerous wrestlers in major and independent promotions, resulting in the termination and/or suspension of many.
- July 1–2 – AEW's Fyter Fest is the first event to have live fans in attendance during the COVID-19 pandemic, albeit select fans (venue sponsors who were invited).
- July 27 – CyberAgent founded CyberFight as the umbrella brand for DDT Pro-Wrestling, Ganbare☆Pro-Wrestling, Pro Wrestling Noah, and Tokyo Joshi Pro Wrestling. CyberFight was founded to oversee and promote the four individual promotions, similar to WWE's brand extension.
- August 7 – NJPW Strong premiered on NJPW World and FITE TV.
- August 21 – WWE debuted the ThunderDome for their Raw and SmackDown brands, a virtual fan viewing experience used for TV shows and pay-per-views.
- August 27 – AEW Dynamite became the first major wrestling show to have ticketed fans in attendance during the COVID-19 pandemic (10–15% capacity of venue).
- September 15 – Primetime Live premiered on FITE TV.
- October 4 – WWE debuted the Capitol Wrestling Center for their NXT brand, similar to the ThunderDome but with a small live crowd of select fans included.
- December 1 – NWA Shockwave premiered on YouTube.

== Accomplishments and tournaments ==
=== AAA ===
Accomplishment	Winner	Date won	Notes
Copa Triplemanía Femenil	Lady Shani	December 12	Defeated Lady Maravilla, Hades, Big Mami, Pimpinela Escarlata, Mamba, Chik Tormenta, Faby Apache, and La Hiedra to win.

=== AEW ===
Accomplishment	Winner(s)	Date won	Notes
Casino Ladder Match	Brian Cage	May 23	Defeated Darby Allin, Colt Cabana, Orange Cassidy, Scorpio Sky, Kip Sabian, Frankie Kazarian, Luchasaurus, and Joey Janela to earn an AEW World Championship match, originally scheduled for the second night of Fyter Fest, but rescheduled for Fight for the Fallen due to COVID-19 pandemic-related issues; Cage was unsuccessful in winning the championship.
AEW TNT Championship tournament	Cody	May 23	Defeated Lance Archer in the tournament final to determine the inaugural champion.
AEW Women's Tag Team Cup Tournament: The Deadly Draw	Diamante and Ivelisse	August 13 (aired August 22)	Defeated The Nightmare Sisters (Allie and Brandi Rhodes) in the tournament final to win The Deadly Draw Trophy.
Casino Battle Royale (Men)	Lance Archer	September 5	Last eliminated Eddie Kingston to earn an AEW World Championship match, which occurred on the Dynamite One Year Anniversary Show on October 14; Archer was unsuccessful in winning the championship.
AEW World Championship Eliminator Tournament	Kenny Omega	November 7	Defeated Adam Page in the tournament final to earn an AEW World Championship match; Omega subsequently defeated Jon Moxley to win the title at Dynamite: Winter Is Coming on December 2.
Dynamite Diamond Battle Royale	MJF and Orange Cassidy	December 2	12-man battle royal to determine the two participants in the Dynamite Diamond Final for the AEW Dynamite Diamond Ring. MJF and Cassidy co-won the battle royal to face each other on Dynamite the following week where MJF defeated Cassidy to win the ring.

=== All Japan Pro-Wrestling (AJPW) ===
Dates		Tournament	Final
Start	Final	Tournament	Final
June 30	July 13	5th Asunaro Cup	Dan Tamura defeated Hokuto Omori to win the 5th Asunaro Cup
September 12	October 5	Champion Carnival	Zeus defeated Kento Miyahara to win the 2020 Champion Carnival

=== Big Japan Pro Wrestling ===
Dates		Tournament	Final
Start	Final	Tournament	Final
March 3	April 26	Ikkitousen Strong Climb	Daichi Hashimoto defeated Quiet Storm to win the 2020 Ikkitousen Strong Climb.

=== CMLL ===
Accomplishment	Winner(s)	Date won	Notes
Reyes del Aire	Templario	January 14	
Family tag team tournament	Nueva Generación Dinamitas (El Cuatrero and Sansón)	January 16–17	
Torneo Nacional de Parejas Increíbles	Carístico and Forastero	February 14–28	
Torneo de parejas familiares	Nueva Generación Dinamitas (El Cuatrero and Sansón)	February 24	
Mexican National Tag Team Championship tournament	Atlantis Jr. and Flyer	March 13	Won a 16-team tournament for the championship.
Mexican National Women's Tag Team Championship tournament	La Jarochita and Lluvia	October 2–16	Defeated La Amapola and La Metálica in the finals for the vacant title.
Rey del Inframundo	El Terrible	October 23-30	Defeated Euforia in the finals to win the vacant title.
Leyenda de Azul	Angel de Oro	November 27	Defeated Ephesto in the finals to win the elimination tournament.

=== Dragon Gate ===
Dates		Tournament	Final
Start	Final	Tournament	Final
January 25	January 26	Ashiyanikki Cup Six Man Tag Team Tournament	Team Dragon Gate (Ben-K, Dragon Dia & Strong Machine J) defeated R.E.D. (Big R Shimizu, Eita & Kaito Ishida) to win the 2020 Ashiyanikki Cup Six Man Tag Team Tournament.
May 15	June 7	King of Gate	Eita defeated Naruki Doi to win the 2020 King Of Gate.

=== DDT Pro-Wrestling ===
Dates		Tournament	Final
Start	Final	Tournament	Final
August 8	August 23	King of DDT	Tetsuya Endo defeated T-Hawk to win the 2020 King of DDT Tournament.
November 22	December 27	D-Oh Grand Prix	TBD

=== Impact ===
Accomplishment	Winner(s)	Date won	Notes
Impact World Championship #1 Contender's Tournament	Ace Austin	June 2	Defeated Wentz (who replaced his Rascalz teammate Trey) in the tournament final to win a future Impact World Championship match, but champion Tessa Blanchard was stripped of the title and released on June 25. Austin would later be involved in a five-way elimination match at Slammiversary for the vacant title, but was unsuccessful
Impact Knockouts Championship #1 Contender's Gauntlet Match	Kylie Rae	July 18	Last eliminated Taya Valkyrie to win a future Impact Knockouts Championship match. However, Rae failed to appear at Bound for Glory for her match against champion Deonna Purrazzo. Su Yung would later replace her and win the title. Rae subsequently announced her temporary retirement from wrestling two weeks later.
Call Your Shot Gauntlet	Rhino	October 24	Last eliminated Sami Callihan to win the Call Your Shot Trophy for a championship match of his choosing. Rhino also won an Impact contract for his tag team partner Heath. Had neither Heath or Rhino won the match, Rhino would've be fired. Rhino would later use the trophy to win the Impact World Tag Team Championship as a part of Violent By Design on the May 2 episode of Impact.

=== IWRG ===
Dates		Tournament	Final
Start	Final	Tournament	Final
June 14	September 6	Rey del Ring	Demonio Infernal (c) defeated Shun Skywalker to retain the 2020 IWRG Rey del Ring Championship.

=== Michinoku Pro Wrestling ===
Dates		Tournament	Final
Start	Final	Tournament	Final
May 30	June 28	Okama Saikyou League	MUSASHI defeated Koji Kawamura to win the 2020 Okama Saikyou League.

=== MLW ===
Accomplishment	Winner	Date won	Notes
Opera Cup	Tom Lawlor	December 23	Defeated Low Ki in the tournament final to win the Opera Cup.

=== NJPW ===
Accomplishment	Winner(s)	Date won	Notes
New Japan Cup	Evil	July 11	Defeated Kazuchika Okada in the tournament final to win.
NEVER Openweight 6-Man Tag Team Championship tournament	Chaos (Hirooki Goto, Tomohiro Ishii, and Yoshi-Hashi)	August 9	Defeated Chaos (Kazuchika Okada, Toru Yano and Sho) in the tournament final to win the titles.
New Japan Cup USA	Kenta	August 21	Defeated David Finlay in the tournament final to win.
KOPW tournament	Toru Yano	August 29	Defeated Kazuchika Okada, El Desperado and Sanada in a four-way match which acted as the finals of an eight-man tournament to become the first provisional champion.
IWGP Junior Heavyweight Tag Team Championship tournament	Suzuki-gun (El Desperado and Yoshinobu Kanemaru)	September 11	Defeated Los Ingobernables de Japón (Bushi and Hiromu Takahashi) in the tournament final to win the titles.
Lion's Break Crown	Clark Connors	October 9	Defeated Danny Limelight in the tournament final to win.
G1 Climax	Kota Ibushi	October 18	Defeated Sanada in the tournament final to win.
World Tag League	Guerrillas of Destiny; Tama Tonga & Tanga Loa	December 11	Defeated Juice Robinson & David Finlay in the tournament final to win.
Best of the Super Juniors	Hiromu Takahashi	December 11	Defeated El Desperado in the tournament final to win.
Super J-Cup	El Phantasmo	December 12	Defeated A. C. H. in the tournament final to win.

=== NWA ===
Accomplishment	Winner(s)	Date won	Notes
NWA World Television Championship tournament	Ricky Starks	January 24	Defeated Trevor Murdoch in the tournament final to win the revived NWA World Television Championship; the title had been inactive since 2000.

=== Pro Wrestling Noah ===
Dates		Tournament	Final
Start	Final	Tournament	Final
September 18	October 11	N-1 Victory	Katsuhiko Nakajima defeated Kaito Kiyomiya to win the 2020 N-1 Victory.

=== Pro Wrestling Zero1 ===
Dates		Tournament	Final
Start	Final	Tournament	Final
July 5	August 2	Tenka-Ichi Junior	Shoki Kitamura defeated El Lindaman to win the 2020 Tenka-Ichi Junior.
October 2	November 1	Fire Festival	Hartley Jackson defeated Tamura Hayato to win the 2020 Fire Festival.

=== ROH ===
Accomplishment	Winner(s)	Date won	Notes
ROH Pure Tournament	Jonathan Gresham	August 23 (aired October 31)	Defeated Tracy Williams in the tournament final to win the revived ROH Pure Championship; the title had been inactive since 2006.

=== Sendai Girls ===
Accomplishment	Winner	Date won	Notes
Jaja Uma Tournament	Mei Hoshizuki	September 22	

=== WWE ===
Accomplishment	Winner(s)	Date won	Notes
Royal Rumble (Women)	Charlotte Flair	January 26	Winner received their choice of a championship match for either the Raw Women's Championship, SmackDown Women's Championship, or NXT Women's Championship at WrestleMania 36; Flair from Raw last eliminated Shayna Baszler to win and chose the NXT Women's Championship, which she subsequently won from Rhea Ripley.
Royal Rumble (Men)	Drew McIntyre	January 26	Winner received their choice of a championship match for either Raw's WWE Championship, SmackDown's Universal Championship, or the NXT Championship at WrestleMania 36; McIntyre last eliminated Roman Reigns to win and chose his own brand's WWE Championship, which he subsequently won from Brock Lesnar.
Dusty Rhodes Tag Team Classic	The BroserWeights (Matt Riddle and Pete Dunne)	January 29	Defeated The Grizzled Young Veterans (Zack Gibson and James Drake) in the tournament final to win the Dusty Rhodes Tag Team Classic Trophy and an NXT Tag Team Championship match at TakeOver: Portland, which they subsequently won from The Undisputed Era (Bobby Fish and Kyle O'Reilly).
Tuwaiq Mountain Trophy Gauntlet Match	The Undertaker	February 27	Last eliminated AJ Styles to win the Tuwaiq Mountain Trophy. Undertaker was a last-minute replacement for Rey Mysterio.
Money in the Bank ladder match (Women)	Asuka	April 15 (aired May 10)	Defeated Carmella, Dana Brooke, Lacey Evans, Nia Jax, and Shayna Baszler to win. On the May 11 episode of Raw, previous Raw Women's Champion Becky Lynch revealed that she was going on hiatus due to pregnancy and that the ladder match was actually for the Raw Women's Championship instead of a contract that granted a women's championship match. The women's ladder match happened at the same time as the men's match but concluded first.
Money in the Bank ladder match (Men)	Otis	April 15 (aired May 10)	Defeated AJ Styles, Aleister Black, Daniel Bryan, King Corbin, and Rey Mysterio to win a world championship match contract; however, The Miz defeated Otis to win the contract at Hell in a Cell on October 25. The Miz later successfully cashed in the contract at Elimination Chamber 2021 to win the WWE Championship from Drew McIntyre. The men's ladder match happened at the same time as the women's match but concluded second.
Interim NXT Cruiserweight Championship tournament	El Hijo del Fantasma	May 27 (aired June 3)	As NXT Cruiserweight Champion Jordan Devlin of NXT UK was unable to defend the title in the United States as a result of a travel ban due to the COVID-19 pandemic, an eight-man round-robin tournament was held to crown an interim champion in the U.S. until Devlin's return. Fantasma defeated Drake Maverick in the tournament final to become the interim champion. Fantasma subsequently changed his ring name to Santos Escobar.
WWE Intercontinental Championship tournament	AJ Styles	June 8 (aired June 12)	Defeated Daniel Bryan in the tournament final to win the vacant Intercontinental Championship. Previous champion Sami Zayn was stripped of the title after electing to refrain from competing during the COVID-19 pandemic.
NXT UK Heritage Cup tournament	A-Kid	N/A (aired November 26)	Defeated Trent Seven in the tournament final to determine the inaugural NXT UK Heritage Cup Champion. The actual date the match took place is unknown.

== Title changes ==
=== AEW ===
AEW World Championship
Incoming champion – Chris Jericho
Date	Winner	Event/Show	Note(s)
February 29	Jon Moxley	Revolution	
December 2	Kenny Omega	Dynamite: Winter Is Coming	

AEW TNT Championship
(Title created)
Date	Winner	Event/Show	Note(s)
May 23	Cody	Double or Nothing	Defeated Lance Archer in the tournament final to determine the inaugural champion.
August 13 (aired August 22)	Mr. Brodie Lee	Dynamite	
October 7	Cody	Dynamite: Chris Jericho's 30th Anniversary Celebration	Dog Collar match. For Cody's title defense at Full Gear, his ring name was lengthened to Cody Rhodes following a legal battle with WWE over the trademark for the name. This would in turn be Mr. Brodie Lee's final match before his untimely death on December 26.
November 7	Darby Allin	Full Gear	

AEW Women's World Championship
Incoming champion – Riho
Date	Winner	Event/Show	Note(s)
February 12	Nyla Rose	Dynamite	First trans woman to win a women's championship in a major American promotion.
May 23	Hikaru Shida	Double or Nothing	No Disqualification and No Countout match.

AEW World Tag Team Championship
Incoming champions – SoCal Uncensored (Frankie Kazarian and Scorpio Sky)
Date	Winner	Event/Show	Note(s)
January 21	Kenny Omega and Adam Page	Chris Jericho's Rock 'N' Wrestling Rager at Sea Part Deux: Second Wave	Aired on tape delay as an episode of Dynamite on January 22.
September 5	FTR (Cash Wheeler and Dax Harwood)	All Out	
November 7	The Young Bucks (Matt Jackson and Nick Jackson)	Full Gear	Last Chance match where if The Young Bucks had lost, they would have never been able to challenge for the championship again. Additionally, FTR's manager Tully Blanchard was barred from ringside.

FTW Championship
(Title reactivated but not officially sanctioned)
Date	Winner	Event/Show	Note(s)
July 2 (aired July 8)	Brian Cage	Fyter Fest; Night 2	Awarded the championship by Taz due to AEW World Champion Jon Moxley unable to show up for their scheduled championship match as Moxley's wife had tested positive for COVID-19.

=== CMLL ===
CMLL World Heavyweight Championship
Incoming champion – Último Guerrero
No title changes

CMLL World Light Heavyweight Championship
Incoming champion – Niebla Roja
No title changes

CMLL World Middleweight Championship
Incoming champion – El Cuatrero
No title changes

CMLL World Welterweight Championship
Incoming champion – Titán
No title changes

CMLL World Lightweight Championship
Incoming champion – Vacant
No title changes

CMLL World Micro-Estrellas Championship
Incoming champion – Chamuel
No title changes

CMLL World Mini-Estrella Championship
Incoming champion – Shockercito
No title changes

CMLL World Tag Team Championship
Incoming champions – Alianza de Plata y Oro (Carístico and Místico)
No title changes

CMLL World Trios Championship
Incoming champions – Los Guerreros Lagunero (Euforia, Gran Guerrero and Último Guerrero)
No title changes

CMLL World Women's Championship
Incoming champion – Marcela
Date	Winner	Event/Show	Note(s)
October 23	Princesa Sugehit	Super Viernes	

CMLL Arena Coliseo Tag Team Championship
Incoming champions – Esfinge and Tritón
Date	Winner	Event/Show	Note(s)
April 29	Vacated	CMLL Informa	Championship vacated after Tritón left CMLL in September 2019

NWA World Historic Light Heavyweight Championship
Incoming champion – Stuka Jr.
No title changes

NWA World Historic Middleweight Championship
Incoming champion – Carístico
No title changes

NWA World Historic Welterweight Championship
Incoming champion – Volador Jr.
No title changes

Mexican National Heavyweight Championship
Incoming champion – El Terrible
Date	Winner	Event/Show	Note(s)
September 25	Diamante Azul	CMLL on Mexiquense	

Mexican National Light Heavyweight Championship
Incoming champion – Bárbaro Cavernario
No title changes

Mexican National Welterweight Championship
Incoming champion – Soberano Jr.
No title changes

Mexican National Lightweight Championship
Incoming champion – Eléctrico
No title changes

Mexican National Tag Team Championship
Incoming champions – Vacant
Date	Winner	Event/Show	Note(s)
March 13	Atlantis Jr. and Flyer	Super Viernes	Won a 16-team tournament

Mexican National Trios Championship
Incoming champions – Nueva Generación Dinamita (El Cuatrero, Forastero, and Sansón)
No title changes

Mexican National Women's Championship
Incoming champion – La Metálica
Date	Winner	Event/Show	Note(s)
September 25	Reyna Isis	CMLL 87th Anniversary Show	

Mexican National Women's Tag Team Championship
Incoming champions – Vacant
Date	Winner	Event/Show	Note(s)
October 17	La Jarochita and Lluvia	Super Viernes	Defeated La Amapola and La Metálica in the finals of a three-week tournament for the vacant title.

=== Impact ===
Impact World Championship
Incoming champion – Sami Callihan
Date	Winner	Event/Show	Note(s)
January 12	Tessa Blanchard	Hard To Kill	First woman to hold a men's world championship.
June 25	Vacated	N/A	Tessa Blanchard was stripped of the title after she was terminated by Impact for unfulfilled commitments and not being able to agree to new terms before her contract expired on June 30.
July 18	Eddie Edwards	Slammiversary	Fatal five-way elimination match for the vacant championship, also involving Trey Miguel, Ace Austin, Rich Swann, and Eric Young.
August 15 (aired September 1)	Eric Young	Impact!	
October 24	Rich Swann	Bound for Glory	

Impact X Division Championship
Incoming champion – Ace Austin
Date	Winner	Event/Show	Note(s)
April 8–10 (aired April 21)	Willie Mack	Rebellion; Night 1	The two-part event was taped between April 8–10, but it is currently unknown which day this match was taped.
July 18	Chris Bey	Slammiversary	
August 14 (aired August 18)	Rohit Raju	Emergence; Night 1	This was a Triple Threat match also involving TJP
December 12	Manik	Final Resolution	

Impact Knockouts Championship
Incoming champion – Taya Valkyrie
Date	Winner	Event/Show	Note(s)
January 18 (aired February 11)	Jordynne Grace	Impact!	
July 18	Deonna Purrazzo	Slammiversary	
October 24	Su Yung	Bound for Glory	
November 14	Deonna Purrazzo	Turning Point	No Disqualification match

Impact World Tag Team Championship
Incoming champions – The North (Ethan Page and Josh Alexander)
Date	Winner	Event/Show	Note(s)
July 19 (aired July 21)	The Motor City Machine Guns (Chris Sabin and Alex Shelley)	Impact!	
October 24	The North (Ethan Page and Josh Alexander)	Bound for Glory	Defeated previous champions The Motor City Machine Guns (Chris Sabin and Alex Shelley), The Good Brothers (Doc Gallows and Karl Anderson), and Ace Austin & Madman Fulton in a Fatal Four Way Tag Team match
November 14	The Good Brothers (Doc Gallows and Karl Anderson)	Turning Point	

TNA World Heavyweight Championship
(Title reactivated but not officially sanctioned)
Date	Winner	Event/Show	Note(s)
April 8–10 (aired April 28)	Moose	Rebellion; Night 2	Declared himself the champion due to Impact World Champion Tessa Blanchard being unable to show up for scheduled championship match against Michael Elgin and Eddie Edwards due COVID-19 travel restrictions.

=== IWRG ===
IWRG Intercontinental Heavyweight Championship
Incoming champion – El Hijo de Canis Lupus
No title changes

IWRG Intercontinental Lightweight Championship
Incoming champion – Vacant
No title changes

IWRG Intercontinental Middleweight Championship
Incoming champion – Imposible
Date	Winner	Event/Show	Note(s)
January 1	Vacated	N/A	Imposible changed his ring persona to "Fuerza Guerrera Next Generation" and the State of Mexico wrestling commission forced him to vacated the championship.
January 1	Demonio Infernal	Cinco Luchas en Jaula	Defeated Fuerza Guerrera Nueva Generacion, Pasion Cristal, Ave Rex, Emperador Azteca, El Hijo del Alebrije in a steel cage match

IWRG Intercontinental Tag Team Championship
Incoming champions – Bryce Benjamin and Marshe Rockett
No title changes

IWRG Intercontinental Trios Championship
Incoming champions – Centella de Oro, Multifacético, and Prayer
No title changes

IWRG Intercontinental Welterweight Championship
Incoming champion – Cerebro Negro
No title changes

IWRG Junior de Juniors Championship
Incoming champion – El Hijo del Médico Asesino
No title changes

IWRG Rey del Aire Championship
Incoming champion – Dragón Bane
No title changes

IWRG Rey del Ring Championship
Incoming champion – Demonio Infernal
No title changes

Distrito Federal Trios Championship
Incoming champions – El Infierno Eterno (Demonio Infernal, Eterno, and Lunatic Xtreme)
No title changes

=== AAA ===
AAA Mega Championship
Incoming champion – Kenny Omega
No title changes

AAA World Cruiserweight Championship
Incoming champion – Laredo Kid
No title changes

AAA World Mini-Estrella Championship
Incoming champion – Dinastía
No title changes

AAA Latin American Championship
Incoming champion – Daga
No title changes

AAA Reina de Reinas Championship
Incoming champion – Taya Valkyrie
No title changes

AAA World Tag Team Championship
Incoming champions – Lucha Brothers (Fenix and Pentagón Jr.)
No title changes

AAA World Mixed Tag Team Championship
Incoming champions – Lady Maravilla and Villano III Jr.
No title changes

AAA World Trios Championship
Incoming champions – Jinetes del Aire (El Hijo del Vikingo, Octagón Jr., and Myzteziz Jr.)
No title changes

=== MLW ===
MLW World Heavyweight Championship
Incoming champion – Jacob Fatu
No title changes.

MLW World Tag Team Championship
Incoming champions – The Von Erichs (Marshall Von Erich and Ross Von Erich)
No title changes.

MLW World Middleweight Championship
Incoming champion – Myron Reed
No title changes.

MLW National Openweight Championship
Incoming champion – Alexander Hammerstone
No title changes.

=== NJPW ===
IWGP Heavyweight Championship
Incoming champion – Kazuchika Okada
Date	Winner	Event/Show	Note(s)
January 5	Tetsuya Naito	Wrestle Kingdom 14 in Tokyo Dome; Night 2	Double Gold Dash match in which Naito also defended the IWGP Intercontinental Championship.
July 12	Evil	Dominion in Osaka-jo Hall	
August 29	Tetsuya Naito	Summer Struggle in Jingu	

IWGP Intercontinental Championship
Incoming champion – Jay White
Date	Winner	Event/Show	Note(s)
January 4	Tetsuya Naito	Wrestle Kingdom 14 in Tokyo Dome; Night 1	
July 12	Evil	Dominion in Osaka-jo Hall	
August 29	Tetsuya Naito	Summer Struggle in Jingu	

IWGP United States Championship
Incoming champion – Lance Archer
Date	Winner	Event/Show	Note(s)
January 4	Jon Moxley	Wrestle Kingdom 14 in Tokyo Dome; Night 1	Texas Deathmatch.

IWGP Tag Team Championship
Incoming champions – Guerrillas of Destiny (Tama Tonga and Tanga Loa)
Date	Winner	Event/Show	Note(s)
January 4	FinJuice (David Finlay and Juice Robinson)	Wrestle Kingdom 14 in Tokyo Dome; Night 1	
February 1	Guerrillas of Destiny (Tama Tonga and Tanga Loa)	The New Beginning USA	
February 21	Golden☆Ace (Hiroshi Tanahashi and Kota Ibushi)	New Japan Road	
July 12	Dangerous Tekkers (Taichi and Zack Sabre Jr.)	Dominion in Osaka-jo Hall	

IWGP Junior Heavyweight Championship
Incoming champion – Will Ospreay
Date	Winner	Event/Show	Note(s)
January 4	Hiromu Takahashi	Wrestle Kingdom 14 in Tokyo Dome; Night 1	
August 29	Taiji Ishimori	Summer Struggle in Jingu	

IWGP Junior Heavyweight Tag Team Championship
Incoming champions – Bullet Club (El Phantasmo and Taiji Ishimori)
Date	Winner	Event/Show	Note(s)
January 5	Roppongi 3K (Sho and Yoh)	Wrestle Kingdom 14 in Tokyo Dome; Night 2	
August 28	Vacated	—	Title held up after Roppongi 3K were unable to defend due to Yoh's ACL tear.
September 11	Suzuki-gun (El Desperado and Yoshinobu Kanemaru)	New Japan Road	Defeated Los Ingobernables de Japón (Bushi and Hiromu Takahashi) in the tournament final to win the titles.

NEVER Openweight Championship
Incoming champion – Kenta
Date	Winner	Event/Show	Note(s)
January 5	Hirooki Goto	Wrestle Kingdom 14 in Tokyo Dome; Night 2	
February 1	Shingo Takagi	The New Beginning in Sapporo	
August 29	Minoru Suzuki	Summer Struggle in Jingu	
November 7	Shingo Takagi	Power Struggle	

NEVER Openweight 6-Man Tag Team Championship
Incoming champions – Taguchi Japan (Ryusuke Taguchi, Togi Makabe, and Toru Yano)
Date	Winner	Event/Show	Note(s)
January 5	Los Ingobernables de Japón (Evil, Shingo Takagi, and Bushi)	Wrestle Kingdom 14 in Tokyo Dome; Night 2	Five-team Gauntlet match, also involving Chaos (Tomohiro Ishii, Yoshi-Hashi, and Robbie Eagles), Suzuki-gun (Taichi, El Desperado, and Yoshinobu Kanemaru), and Bullet Club (Bad Luck Fale, Yujiro Takahashi, and Chase Owens).
August 1	Vacated	—	Evil left Los Ingobernables de Japón to join Bullet Club, thus the title was vacated.
August 9	Chaos (Hirooki Goto, Tomohiro Ishii, and Yoshi-Hashi)	Summer Struggle	Defeated Chaos (Kazuchika Okada, Toru Yano and Sho) in the tournament final to win the titles.

KOPW
(Title created)
Date	Winner	Event/Show	Note(s)
August 29	Toru Yano	Summer Struggle in Jingu	Defeated Kazuchika Okada, El Desperado, and Sanada in a four-way match, which acted as the finals of an eight-man tournament, to become the first provisional champion. Due to the title's untraditional format, Yano was not officially recognized as the year's champion until he defeated Bad Luck Fale in a Bodyslam or No Corner Pads match on December 23.

=== NWA ===
NWA Worlds Heavyweight Championship
Incoming champion – Nick Aldis
No title changes.

NWA World Women's Championship
Incoming champion – Allysin Kay
Date	Winner	Event/Show	Note(s)
January 24	Thunder Rosa	Hard Times	
October 27	Serena Deeb	UWN Primetime Live	

NWA National Championship
Incoming champion – Aron Stevens
Date	Winner	Event/Show	Note(s)
September 29	Trevor Murdoch	UWN Primetime Live	

NWA World Television Championship
(Title created)
Date	Winner	Event/Show	Note(s)
January 24	Ricky Starks	Hard Times	Defeated Trevor Murdoch in the finals of an eight-man tournament to become the inaugural champion.
January 26 (aired March 3)	Zicky Dice	NWA Power	
October 20	Elijah Burke	UWN Primetime Live	

NWA World Tag Team Championship
Incoming champions – Rock 'n' Roll Express (Ricky Morton and Robert Gibson)
Date	Winner	Event/Show	Note(s)
January 24	Eli Drake and James Storm	Hard Times	Triple threat tag team match, also involving The Wild Cards (Royce Isaacs and Thom Latimer)
November 10	Aron Stevens and JR Kratos	UWN Primetime Live	

=== ROH ===
ROH World Championship
Incoming champion – PCO
Date	Winner	Event/Show	Note(s)
February 29	Rush	Gateway to Honor	

ROH World Television Championship
Incoming champion – Dragon Lee
No title changes.

ROH Pure Championship
(Title reactivated)
Date	Winner	Event/Show	Note(s)
August 23 (aired October 31)	Jonathan Gresham	ROH Pure Tournament Final	Won a 16-man tournament to crown a new champion of the revived title, last defeating Tracy Williams in the finals.

ROH World Tag Team Championship
Incoming champions – Jay Lethal and Jonathan Gresham
No title changes.

ROH World Six-Man Tag Team Championship
Incoming champions – Villain Enterprises (Marty Scurll, Brody King, and PCO)
Date	Winner	Event/Show	Note(s)
January 11	Mexa Squad (Bandido, Flamita, and Rey Horus)	Saturday Night at Center Stage	Flip Gordon wrestled in place of PCO for Villain Enterprises during this match due to PCO defending the ROH World Championship later in the night.

Women of Honor Championship
Incoming champion – Kelly Klein
Date	Winner	Event/Show	Note(s)
January 1	Deactivated	—	Kelly Klein was stripped of the championship after her contract was not renewed by ROH. The Women of Honor World Championship was subsequently retired and replaced with the ROH Women's World Championship.

=== The Crash ===
The Crash Heavyweight Championship
Incoming champion – Bandido
No title changes

The Crash Cruiserweight Championship
Incoming champion – Oraculo
No title changes

The Crash Junior Championship
Incoming champion – Terro Azteca
No title changes

The Crash Tag Team Championship
Incoming champions – La Rebelión Amarilla (Bestia 666 and Mecha Wolf)
Date	Winner	Event/Show	Note(s)
February 22	Los Traumas (Trauma I and Trauma II)	The Crash Show	Three-way steel cage match, also involving El Mesías and Oráculo

The Crash Women's Championship
Incoming champion – Lady Flamer
No title changes

=== WWE ===
– Raw
– SmackDown
– NXT
– NXT UK
– Unbranded

==== Raw and SmackDown ====
Raw and SmackDown each have a world championship, a secondary championship, a women's championship, and a male tag team championship.

WWE Championship
Incoming champion – Brock Lesnar
Date	Winner	Event/Show	Note(s)
March 25 (aired April 5)	Drew McIntyre	WrestleMania 36; Part 2	First Scottish and first UK-born wrestler to hold a world championship in WWE. The event was taped on March 25 and 26, but McIntyre confirmed in his memoir, A Chosen Destiny: My Story, that the WWE Championship match was taped on March 25.
October 25	Randy Orton	Hell in a Cell	Hell in a Cell match.
November 16	Drew McIntyre	Raw	No Disqualification, No Countout match.

WWE Universal Championship
Incoming champion – "The Fiend" Bray Wyatt
Date	Winner	Event/Show	Note(s)
February 27	Goldberg	Super ShowDown	First wrestler to win a world championship after being inducted into the WWE Hall of Fame.
March 25 or 26 (aired April 4)	Braun Strowman	WrestleMania 36; Part 1	The event was taped on March 25 and 26, but it is currently unknown which day this match was taped.
August 23	"The Fiend" Bray Wyatt	SummerSlam	Falls Count Anywhere match.
August 30	Roman Reigns	Payback	No Holds Barred Triple Threat match also involving Braun Strowman, who Reigns pinned.

WWE United States Championship
Incoming champion – Andrade
Date	Winner	Event/Show	Note(s)
May 25	Apollo Crews	Raw	
August 30	Bobby Lashley	Payback	

WWE Intercontinental Championship
Incoming champion – Shinsuke Nakamura
Date	Winner	Event/Show	Note(s)
January 31	Braun Strowman	SmackDown	
March 8	Sami Zayn	Elimination Chamber	3-on-1 Handicap match, also involving Shinsuke Nakamura and Cesaro as Zayn's partners. Zayn won the title by pinning Braun Strowman.
May 12	Vacated	Backstage	Sami Zayn was stripped of the title after electing to refrain from competing during the COVID-19 pandemic.
June 8 (aired June 12)	AJ Styles	SmackDown	Defeated Daniel Bryan in the tournament final for the vacant title.
August 21	Jeff Hardy	SmackDown	On August 28, Sami Zayn returned with his own title belt, claiming to be the legitimate champion as he was never defeated. WWE did not recognize Zayn as champion; however, this led to the following match to determine the undisputed champion.
September 27	Sami Zayn	Clash of Champions	Triple threat ladder match also involving AJ Styles in which the winner had to retrieve both Jeff Hardy's belt and Zayn's faux belt to determine the undisputed Intercontinental Champion.
December 22 (aired December 25)	Big E	Christmas Day SmackDown	Lumberjack match.

WWE Raw Women's Championship
Incoming champion – Becky Lynch
Date	Winner	Event/Show	Note(s)
April 15 (aired May 10)	Asuka	Money in the Bank	Money in the Bank ladder match, also involving Carmella, Dana Brooke, Lacey Evans, Nia Jax, and Shayna Baszler. On the May 11 episode of Raw, Becky Lynch announced that she was going on hiatus due to pregnancy and that the women's ladder match was actually for the championship instead of a contract that granted a championship match. Lynch then passed the title directly onto Asuka.
July 20 (aired July 27)	Sasha Banks	Raw	The title could be won by pinfall, submission, disqualification, or count-out; Banks won via count-out.
August 23	Asuka	SummerSlam	

WWE SmackDown Women's Championship
Incoming champion – Bayley
Date	Winner	Event/Show	Note(s)
October 25	Sasha Banks	Hell in a Cell	Hell in a Cell match.

WWE Raw Tag Team Championship
Incoming champions – The Viking Raiders (Erik and Ivar)
Date	Winner	Event/Show	Note(s)
January 20	Seth Rollins and Buddy Murphy	Raw	Buddy Murphy's ring name was shortened to Murphy on February 7.
March 2	The Street Profits (Angelo Dawkins and Montez Ford)	Raw	Last Chance match.
October 12	The New Day (Kofi Kingston and Xavier Woods)	Raw	As a result of the 2020 WWE Draft, then-SmackDown Tag Team Champions The New Day were drafted to Raw while then-Raw Tag Team Champions The Street Profits (Angelo Dawkins and Montez Ford) were drafted to SmackDown. To keep the branded championships on their respective brands, WWE official Adam Pearce had the two teams trade championships. Also due to the draft and unlike previous reigns, Big E was not also recognized as champion under the Freebird Rule as he was drafted to SmackDown, thus splitting him from the team.
December 20	The Hurt Business (Cedric Alexander and Shelton Benjamin)	TLC: Tables, Ladders & Chairs	

WWE SmackDown Tag Team Championship
Incoming champions – The New Day (Big E, Kofi Kingston, and Xavier Woods)
Date	Winner	Event/Show	Note(s)
February 27	The Miz and John Morrison	Super ShowDown	Big E and Kofi Kingston represented The New Day.
April 17	The New Day (Big E, Kofi Kingston, and Xavier Woods)	SmackDown	Triple threat match between Big E (representing The New Day), Jey Uso (representing The Usos), and The Miz (representing himself and John Morrison). Big E pinned Miz to win the title, with Kingston and Woods also recognized as champion under the Freebird Rule.
July 19	Shinsuke Nakamura and Cesaro	The Horror Show at Extreme Rules	Tables match. Big E and Kofi Kingston represented The New Day.
October 9	The New Day (Kofi Kingston and Xavier Woods)	SmackDown	Unlike previous reigns, Big E was not also recognized as champion under the Freebird Rule as he was split from the team as result of the 2020 WWE Draft; Big E remained on SmackDown while Kingston and Woods were drafted to Raw.
October 12	The Street Profits (Angelo Dawkins and Montez Ford)	Raw	As a result of the 2020 WWE Draft, then-SmackDown Tag Team Champions The New Day (Kofi Kingston and Xavier Woods) were drafted to Raw while then-Raw Tag Team Champions The Street Profits were drafted to SmackDown. To keep the branded championships on their respective brands, WWE official Adam Pearce had the two teams trade championships.

==== NXT ====
NXT Championship
Incoming champion – Adam Cole
Date	Winner	Event/Show	Note(s)
July 1 (aired July 8)	Keith Lee	The Great; American Bash; Night 2	Winner Takes All match in which Lee also defended the NXT North American Championship.
August 22	Karrion Kross	TakeOver XXX	
August 26	Vacated	NXT	Karrion Kross relinquished the title due to suffering a separated shoulder during his match at TakeOver XXX.
September 8	Finn Bálor	Super Tuesday II	A 60-minute fatal four-way iron man match occurred on the September 1 episode of NXT Super Tuesday between Finn Bálor, Adam Cole, Tommaso Ciampa, and Johnny Gargano for the vacant championship, but the match ended in a tie between Bálor and Cole. NXT General Manager William Regal then scheduled a sudden death match between the two for the next episode where Bálor defeated Cole to win the vacant title.

NXT North American Championship
Incoming champion – Roderick Strong
Date	Winner	Event/Show	Note(s)
January 22	Keith Lee	NXT	
July 15 (aired July 22)	Vacated	NXT	Keith Lee voluntarily relinquished the title so that he could focus on defending the NXT Championship.
August 22	Damian Priest	TakeOver XXX	Defeated Bronson Reed, Cameron Grimes, Johnny Gargano, and Velveteen Dream in a five-way ladder match to win the vacant title.
October 28	Johnny Gargano	Halloween Havoc	Devil's Playground Match.
November 11	Leon Ruff	NXT	
December 6	Johnny Gargano	TakeOver: WarGames	Triple threat match, also involving Damian Priest.

NXT Women's Championship
Incoming champion – Rhea Ripley
Date	Winner	Event/Show	Note(s)
March 25 or 26 (aired April 5)	Charlotte Flair	WrestleMania 36; Part 2	First time an NXT championship was defended at WrestleMania. First wrestler to win an NXT championship before and after NXT became one of WWE's three main brands. The event was taped on March 25 and 26, but it is currently unknown which day this match was taped.
June 7	Io Shirai	TakeOver: In Your House	Triple threat match also involving Rhea Ripley, who Shirai pinned.

NXT Tag Team Championship
Incoming champions – The Undisputed Era (Bobby Fish and Kyle O'Reilly)
Date	Winner	Event/Show	Note(s)
February 16	The BroserWeights (Matt Riddle and Pete Dunne)	TakeOver: Portland	As a result of a travel ban due to the COVID-19 pandemic, Timothy Thatcher substituted for Dunne in title defenses, but was not officially recognized as champion.
May 13	Imperium (Fabian Aichner and Marcel Barthel)	NXT	Timothy Thatcher substituted for Pete Dunne in the title defense because of the COVID-19 pandemic travel ban.
August 26	Breezango (Fandango and Tyler Breeze)	NXT	
October 21	Danny Burch and Oney Lorcan	NXT	

NXT Cruiserweight Championship
Incoming champion – Angel Garza
Date	Winner	Event/Show	Note(s)
January 26	Jordan Devlin	Worlds Collide	Fatal four-way match, also involving Travis Banks and Isaiah "Swerve" Scott, who Devlin pinned. The title became shared with the NXT UK brand due to Devlin's status as an NXT UK wrestler.
May 27 (aired June 3)	El Hijo del Fantasma	NXT	As a result of a travel ban due to the COVID-19 pandemic, Jordan Devlin was unable to defend the title in the United States. An interim champion was crowned to serve as titleholder in the U.S. until Devlin could return; Devlin still defended the title on NXT UK. Fantasma defeated Drake Maverick in the tournament final to determine the U.S.-based interim champion. On the June 10 episode of NXT, Fantasma unmasked himself and changed his ring name to Santos Escobar.

==== NXT UK ====
WWE United Kingdom Championship
Incoming champion – Walter
The title was renamed to NXT United Kingdom Championship during the January 17 taping of NXT UK.
No title changes.

NXT UK Women's Championship
Incoming champion – Kay Lee Ray
No title changes.

NXT UK Tag Team Championship
Incoming champions – Gallus (Mark Coffey and Wolfgang)
No title changes.

NXT UK Heritage Cup
(Title created)
Date	Winner	Event/Show	Note(s)
N/A (aired November 26)	A-Kid	NXT UK	Defeated Trent Seven in the tournament final to determine the inaugural champion. The actual date the match took place is currently unknown.

==== Unbranded ====
These titles are not brand exclusive. The colors indicate the home brand of the champions (names without a color are former WWE wrestlers, Hall of Famers, or non-wrestlers).

WWE 24/7 Championship
Incoming champion – R-Truth
Date	Winner	Event/Show	Note(s)
January 13	Mojo Rawley	Raw	Pinned R-Truth on the entrance ramp after Truth had been attacked by Brock Lesnar.
January 17	R-Truth	WWE Live	
January 17	Mojo Rawley	WWE Live	
January 18	R-Truth	WWE Live	
January 18	Mojo Rawley	WWE Live	
January 19	R-Truth	WWE Live	
January 19	Mojo Rawley	WWE Live	
January 27	R-Truth	Raw	Truth rolled up Mojo Rawley in the ring after Rawley had successfully retained the title in a match against No Way Jose.
January 27	Mojo Rawley	Raw	After losing the title to R-Truth, Rawley performed his finisher on Truth and pinned him to win back the title.
February 10	Riddick Moss	Raw	Following a tag team match, during which the 24/7 rule was suspended, Ross turned on his tag team partner Mojo Rawley and pinned him to win the title.
March 22	R-Truth	N/A	While Riddick Moss was out jogging in his neighborhood in Orlando, Florida, a referee pulled up beside him in a car and Truth, who was hiding in the trunk, surprised Moss and pinned him with a roll-up. Shown on WWE's website and social media accounts.
March 25 or 26 (aired April 4)	Mojo Rawley	WrestleMania 36; Part 1	Pinned R-Truth in the host's viewing area. Just prior to this reign, Rawley was moved to SmackDown. The event was taped on March 25 and 26, but it is currently unknown which day this title change was taped.
March 25 or 26 (aired April 5)	Rob Gronkowski	WrestleMania 36; Part 2	Following a scuffle with several other wrestlers, Gronkowski performed a dive on top of the group and pinned Mojo Rawley to win the championship. NFL player Gronkowski served as the host of the two-part WrestleMania 36. Seventh non-wrestler to win the title. The event was taped on March 25 and 26, but it is currently unknown which day this title change was taped.
June 1	R-Truth	N/A	Truth, disguised as a yard worker, rolled up Rob Gronkowski in Gronkowski's backyard to win the championship. Recorded during the afternoon and shown later that night on Raw.
June 17 (aired June 22)	Akira Tozawa	Raw	R-Truth was originally scheduled to defend the championship against Tozawa in a singles match, however, Truth was attacked by Bobby Lashley. Tozawa then took advantage of the situation and pinned Truth to become champion.
June 27 (aired June 29)	R-Truth	Raw	Singles match during which the 24/7 rule was suspended.
July 20	Shelton Benjamin	Raw	After R-Truth was confronted by MVP and Bobby Lashley backstage, Benjamin attacked Truth and pinned him to win the title.
August 3 (aired August 10)	Akira Tozawa	Raw	Triple threat match, during which the 24/7 rule was suspended, also involving R-Truth, who Tozawa pinned.
August 3 (aired August 10)	R-Truth	Raw	After Akira Tozawa was involved in a six-man tag team match, Truth pinned Tozawa on the entrance ramp.
August 13 (aired August 17)	Shelton Benjamin	Raw	Attacked and pinned R-Truth at ringside.
August 13 (aired August 17)	Cedric Alexander	Raw	After Shelton Benjamin was involved in a six-man tag team match, Alexander rolled up Benjamin at ringside to win the title.
August 13 (aired August 17)	Shelton Benjamin	Raw	After Cedric Alexander had successfully defended the title against Akira Tozawa, Benjamin attacked Alexander and pinned him to win the championship.
August 24	Akira Tozawa	Raw	Fatal four-way match, during which the 24/7 rule was suspended, also involving Cedric Alexander and R-Truth, who Tozawa pinned.
August 31	R-Truth	N/A	Pinned Akira Tozawa in the parking garage where the referee was disguised as the parking garage attendant. Recorded during the afternoon and shown later that night on Raw.
September 27	Drew Gulak	Clash of Champions	After R-Truth found the referee's catering room backstage, Gulak rolled up Truth in the hallway to win the title.
September 27	R-Truth	Clash of Champions	During Drew Gulak's backstage interview, Truth attacked and pinned Gulak to regain the title.
September 28	Akira Tozawa	Raw	Backstage, while one of Tozawa's ninjas presented R-Truth with a black belt contained within a briefcase, Tozawa snuck up behind Truth and pinned him with a rollup to win the title.
September 28	Drew Gulak	Raw	Gulak, disguised as Akira Tozawa's ninja, attacked Tozawa with the briefcase and pinned Tozawa to win the title, unmasking himself afterwards.
September 28	R-Truth	Raw	Truth attacked Drew Gulak with the briefcase and pinned him to win back the title.
October 5	Drew Gulak	Raw	Gulak, disguised as a janitor, pinned R-Truth backstage, who tripped over a mop bucket and slipped on the wet floor.
October 5	R-Truth	Raw	Amidst a brawl inside a dumpster backstage that also involved Akira Tozawa, Truth pinned Drew Gulak to regain the title.
November 2	Drew Gulak	Raw	After Bobby Lashley had defeated R-Truth in a non-title match, Gulak came out and attempted to pin Truth, but Lashley attacked Gulak and laid Gulak's unconscious body on Truth, allowing Gulak to get the pinfall and win the title. Gulak was previously a member of the SmackDown brand, but was drafted to Raw in the 2020 WWE Draft.
November 9	R-Truth	Raw	After The Hurt Business attacked Drew Gulak backstage, Truth pinned Gulak to win the title.
November 9	Akira Tozawa	Raw	Seven-way match, during which the 24/7 rule was suspended, also involving Drew Gulak, Erik, Gran Metalik, Lince Dorado, and Tucker.
November 9	Erik	Raw	Following the seven-way match, Tozawa tried to escape the ring, but Erik rolled up Tozawa to win the title.
November 9	Drew Gulak	Raw	Outside the ring, Gulak rolled up Erik to win the title.
November 9	Tucker	Raw	In an attempt to get away from the other wrestlers outside the ring, Drew Gulak went back inside the ring where Tucker rolled up Gulak to win the title.
November 9	Drew Gulak	Raw	While still locked up in the roll up, Gulak reversed it on Tucker to win back the title.
November 9	Tucker	Raw	While still locked up in the roll up, Tucker reversed it on Drew Gulak to win back the title.
November 9	Gran Metalik	Raw	Following a brawl with the other wrestlers, Metalik performed a top rope elbow drop on Tucker to win the title.
November 9	Lince Dorado	Raw	After celebrating with his tag team partner Gran Metalik, Dorado rolled up Metalik to win the title.
November 9	R-Truth	Raw	After an argument between Gran Metalik and Lince Dorado, Truth attacked both and performed the Attitude Adjustment on Dorado to win the title and escaped backstage.
November 22	The Gobbledy Gooker	Survivor Series; Kickoff	Pinned R-Truth by the panelist table. The character was portrayed by Drew Gulak, however, WWE does not recognize this as a reign for Gulak.
November 22	Akira Tozawa	Survivor Series	After being distracted by a trail of bird seed backstage, Tozawa performed a rollup on The Gobbledy Gooker to win the title.
November 22	R-Truth	Survivor Series	Immediately after Akira Tozawa won the title, Truth appeared and attacked Tozawa with a bag of bird seed and pinned him to regain the title.
December 31	Angel Garza	TikTok's New Year's Eve Party	During the livestream while R-Truth was conversing with The New Day (Kofi Kingston and Xavier Woods), referee John Cone appeared to celebrate and then Garza, who had been flirting with Lana, rolled up Truth to win the title.

WWE Women's Tag Team Championship
Incoming champions – The Kabuki Warriors (Asuka and Kairi Sane)
Date	Winner	Event/Show	Note(s)
March 25 or 26 (aired April 4)	Alexa Bliss and Nikki Cross	WrestleMania 36; Part 1	The event was taped on March 25 and 26, but it is currently unknown which day this match was taped.
May 26 (aired June 5)	Bayley and Sasha Banks	SmackDown	During their first reign, they went by the team name of The Boss 'n' Hug Connection.
August 30	Nia Jax and Shayna Baszler	Payback	
December 20	Asuka and Charlotte Flair	TLC: Tables, Ladders & Chairs	

== Awards and honors ==
=== AAA ===
==== AAA Hall of Fame ====
Inductee
La Parka

=== Impact ===
==== Impact Hall of Fame ====
Inductee
Ken Shamrock

=== WWE ===
==== WWE Hall of Fame ====
Due to the COVID-19 pandemic, the 2020 WWE Hall of Fame ceremony was postponed and merged with the 2021 event. The Class of 2020 was inducted alongside the Class of 2021 at the 2021 ceremony. Listed here are the Class of 2020 inductees.

Category	Inductee
Individual	John "Bradshaw" Layfield
Individual	The British Bulldog (posthumous inductee)
Individual	Jushin "Thunder" Liger
Group	New World Order ("Hollywood" Hulk Hogan, Scott Hall, Kevin Nash, and Sean Waltman)
Group	The Bella Twins (Brie Bella and Nikki Bella)
Celebrity	William Shatner
Warrior Award	Titus O'Neil
Legacy	Ray Stevens
Legacy	Brickhouse Brown
Legacy	Steve Williams
Legacy	Baron Michele Leone
Legacy	Gary Hart

== Debuts ==
- February 11 – Mai Sakurai
- June 6 – Madoka Kikuta
- July 5 – Chie Ozora
- July 23 – Moka Miyamoto
- June 13 – Riko Kaiju
- August 14 – Ami Sourei
- August 23 – Dominik Mysterio
- September 2 – Ren Ayabe
- September 6 – Waka Tsukiyama
- September 27
  - Sumika Yanagawa
  - Yuuri
- October 8 – Bron Breakker
- November 11
  - Colten Gunn
  - Jade Cargill
- November 11 – Misa Kagura
- November 14 – Lady C
- December 12 – Ichiban
- December 15 – La Estrella

== Retirements ==
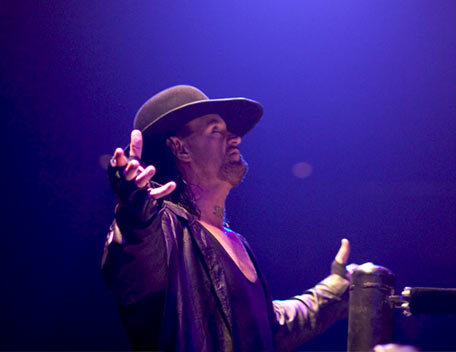
The Undertaker, who wrestled for WWE for 30 years; he had his final match at WrestleMania 36 earlier in the year with his retirement ceremony held at Survivor Series on November 22

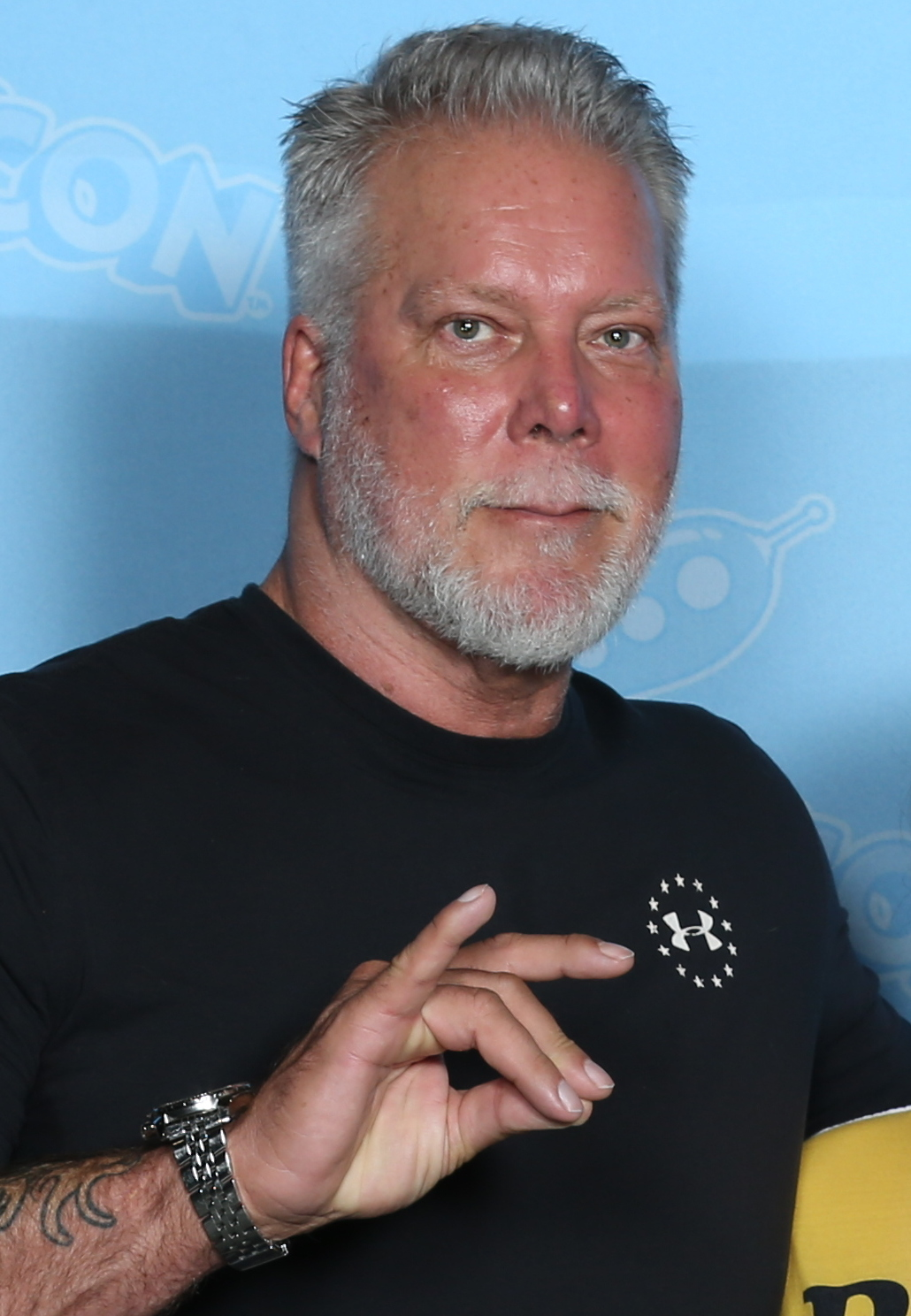
Kevin Nash

- January 5
  - Kevin Nash (1990–2020)
  - Jushin Thunder Liger (1984–2020)
- January 7 – Naoki Sano (1984–2020)
- February 8 - Jimmy Valiant (May 5, 1964 – February 8, 2020) (wrestled one match in 2022)
- February 19 – Tiger Hattori (1978–2020)
- February 22 – Manabu Nakanishi (1992–2020)
- February 24 – Kagetsu (2008–2020)
- February 28 – Gillberg (1990–2020)
- May 15 – D-Von Dudley (1991–2020)
- May 20 – Arisa Hoshiki (2011–2020)
- June 20 – C. W. Anderson (December 2, 1993 – June 19, 2020, returned to wrestling in 2021)
- June 23
  - Sarah Logan (2011–2020, returned for an appearance at Royal Rumble (2022).)
  - Saraya Knight (1999–2020)
- June 29 – Ophidian (2007–2020)
- July 16 – Bobby Fulton (1977–2020)
- August 11 – Vanessa Kraven (2004–2020, returned to wrestling in 2022)
- September 4 – Olímpico (1993–2020)
- September 18 – Hiroe Nagahama (2014–2020)
- October 12 – Erick Stevens (2003–2020)
- October 24 – Mitsuo Momota (May 27, 1970 – October 24, 2020)
- October 31 – Matt Tremont (2007–2020)
- November 22 – The Undertaker (1987–2020)
- November 28 – Jimmy Rave (1999–2020)

== Deaths ==
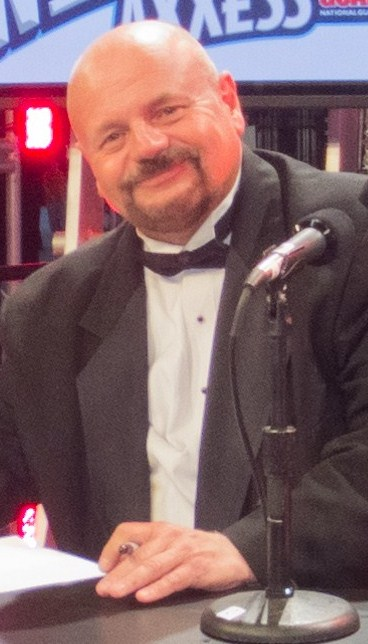
Howard Finkel

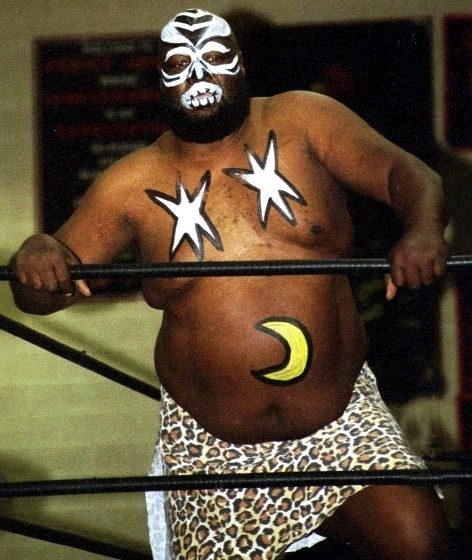
Kamala

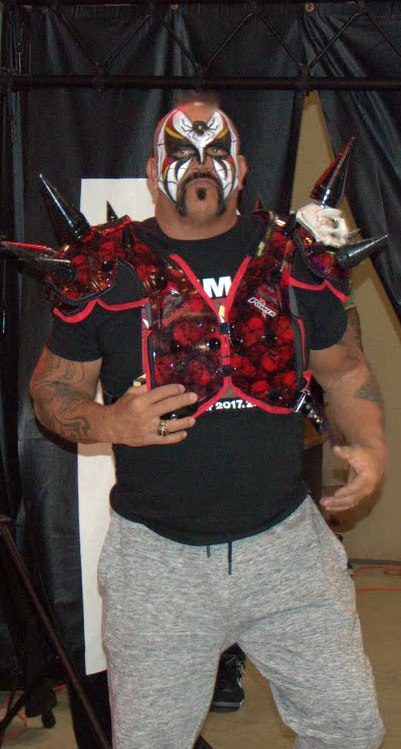
Road Warrior Animal

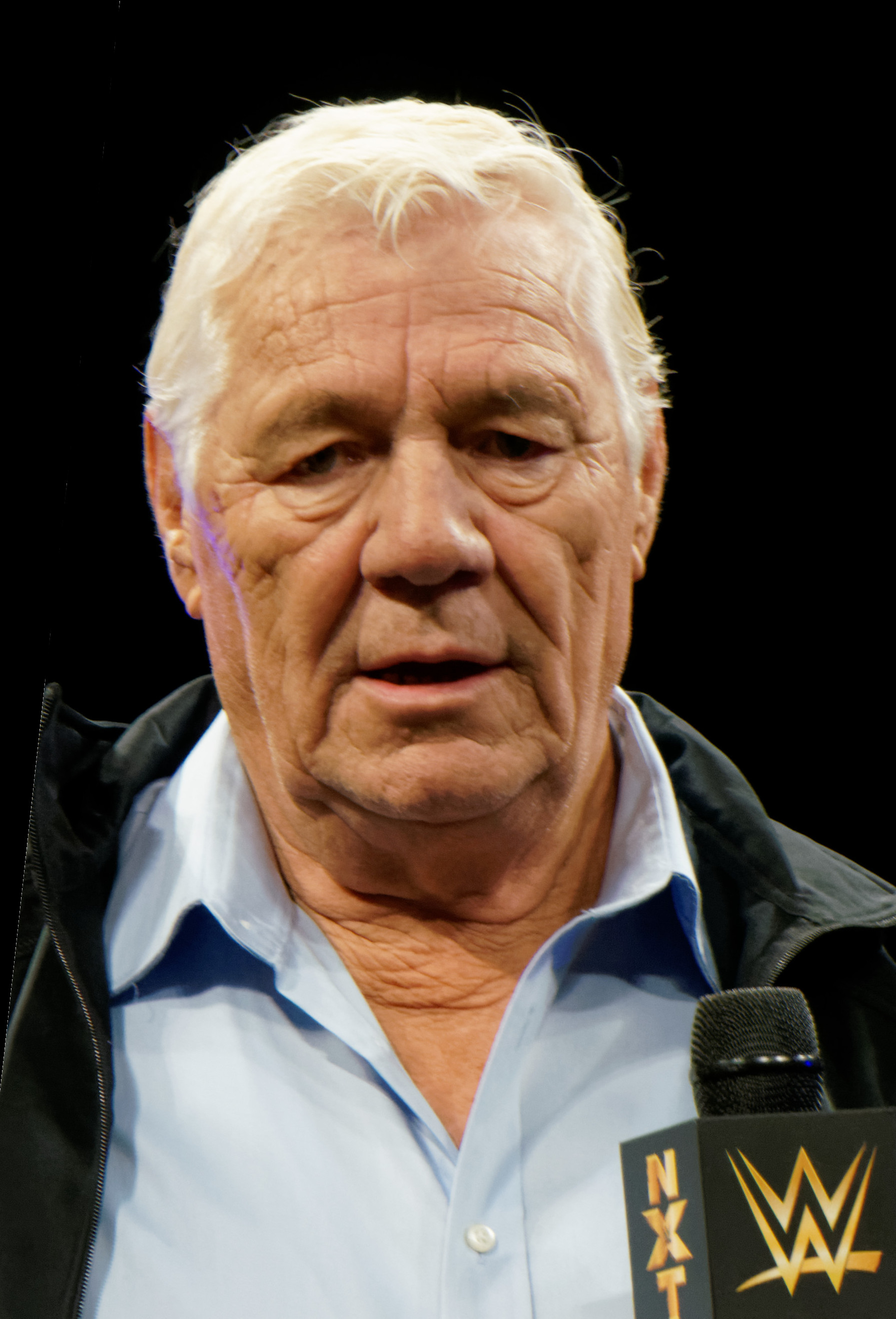
Pat Patterson

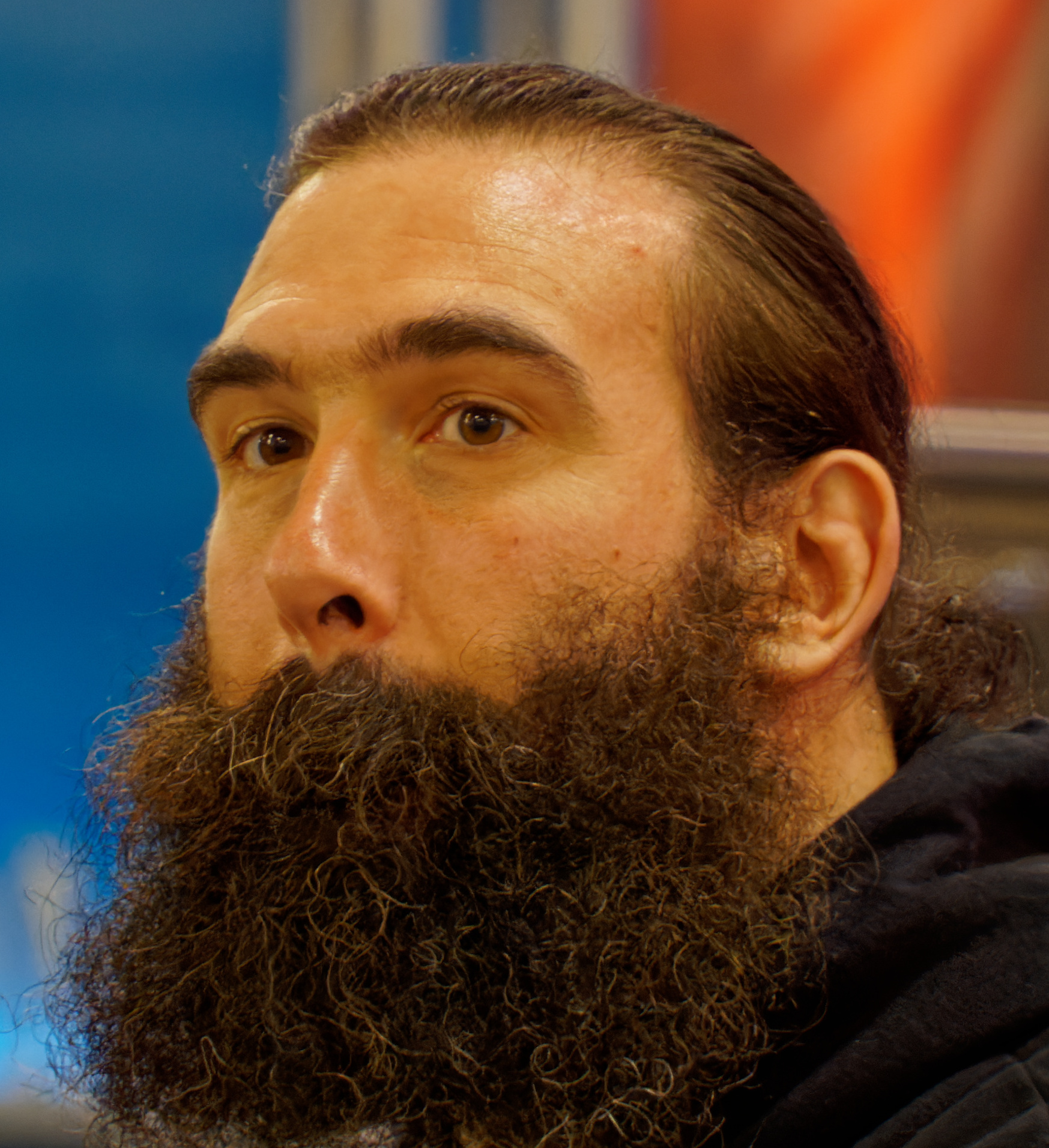
Jon Huber, known as Mr. Brodie Lee in All Elite Wrestling, and Luke Harper in WWE

- January 5 – Charlie Cook (born 1941)
- January 9 – Pampero Firpo (b. 1930)
- January 11 – La Parka II (b. 1966)
- January 12 – Kazuo Sakurada (b. 1948)
- January 15 – Rocky Johnson (b. 1944)
- January 17 – Bobby Kay (b. 1950)
- January 19 – Steve Gillespie (b. 1963)
- January 23 – Hercules Ayala (b. 1950)
- January 25 – Justice Pain (b. 1978)
- January 28 – Carlos Rocha (b. 1927)
- March 5 – Rip Oliver (b. 1952)
- March 8 – Wayne Bridges (b. 1936)
- April 10 - Teijo Khan (b. 1956)
- April 12 – Joe Pedicino (b. 1949)
- April 16 – Howard Finkel (b. 1950)
- April 18
  - Jack Lotz (b. 1933)
  - Dick Steinborn (b. 1933)
- May 6 – Supreme (b. 1970)
- May 15 – Discovery (b. 1965)
- May 17 – Shad Gaspard (b. 1981)
- May 23 – Hana Kimura (b. 1997)
- May 31 – Danny Havoc (b. 1986)
- June 4 – Matematico II (b. 1969)
- June 10 – Mr. Wrestling II (b. 1934)
- June 30 – Tim Brooks (b. 1947)
- July 25 – Z-Barr (b. 1982)
- July 27 – Crybaby Waldo (b. 1966)
- July 31 – Mark Rocco (b. 1951)
- August 9 – Kamala (b. 1950)
- August 16 – Xavier (b. 1977)
- August 27 – Bob Armstrong (b. 1939)
- August 30 – Ric Drasin (b. 1944)
- September 1 – Tom Andrews (wrestler) (b. 1937)
- September 9 – Stevie Lee (b. 1966)
- September 10 – Barry Scott (b. 1955)
- September 21 – Jackie Stallone (b. 1921)
- September 22 – Road Warrior Animal (b. 1960)
- October 9 – Len Rossi (b. 1930)
- October 15 – Karsten Beck (b. 1986)
- October 17 – Principe Aéreo (b. 1994)
- October 20 – John Condrone (b. 1960)
- October 28 – Tracy Smothers (b. 1962)
- November 16 – The Bruiser (b. 1976)
- November 24 – Klaus Kauroff (b. 1941)
- November 25 – Bob Ryder (b. 1956)
- December 2 – Pat Patterson (b. 1941)
- December 10 – Tom Lister Jr. (b. 1958)
- December 20 - Skulu (b. 1973)
- December 21 – Kevin Greene (b. 1962)
- December 24 – Dick Cardinal (b. 1927)
- December 25 – Danny Hodge (b. 1932)
- December 26 – Brodie Lee (b. 1979)

== See also ==
- List of WWE pay-per-view and WWE Network events
- List of AEW pay-per-view events
- List of NJPW pay-per-view events
- List of Impact Wrestling pay-per-view events
- List of ROH pay-per-view events
- List of MLW events
- List of NWA pay-per-view events
- Speaking Out Movement
- WWE ThunderDome
