= 1944 in professional wrestling =

1944 in professional wrestling describes the year's events in the world of professional wrestling.

== List of notable promotions ==
Only one promotion held notable shows in 1944.

Promotion Name	Abbreviation
Empresa Mexicana de Lucha Libre	EMLL

== Calendar of notable shows ==
Date	Promotion(s)	Event	Location	Main Event
September 22	EMLL	EMLL 11th Anniversary Show	Mexico City, Mexico	Gorilla Ramos defeated Black Guzmán (c) in a best two-out-of-three falls match for the Mexican National Light Heavyweight Championship
(c) – denotes defending champion(s)

== Notable events ==
- Paul Jones starts the Georgia Championship Wrestling professional wrestling promotion based in Atlanta, Georgia.

== Championship changes ==
=== EMLL ===
NWA World Middleweight Championship
incoming champion – Tarzán López
No title changes

Mexican National Heavyweight Championship
incoming champion - Rye Duran
No title changes

Mexican National Middleweight Championship
incoming champion – El Santo
Date	Winner	Event/Show	Note(s)
April 1	Tarzán López	Live event	
April 8	Vacated	Live event	
May 31	El Santo	Live event	Defeated Tuffy Truesdale to win the vacant championship

Mexican National Lightweight Championship
incoming champion – Joe Silva
Date	Winner	Event/Show	Note(s)
April 28	Raul Romero	EMLL show	

Mexican National Light Heavyweight Championship
Incoming champion – Black Guzmán
Date	Winner	Event/Show	Note(s)
September 20	Gorilla Ramos	EMLL 11th Anniversary Show	
October 18	Tarzán López	EMLL show	

Mexican National Welterweight Championship
incoming champion – El Santo
Date	Winner	Event/Show	Note(s)
February 8	Jack O'Brien	EMLL show	

== Debuts ==
- Debut date uncertain:
  - June Byers
  - Killer Kowalski
  - Roy Heffernan

== Births ==
- Date of birth unknown:
  - Caswell Martin
  - Larry O'Day(died in 1997)
  - Mike Webster
- January 1 – Jimmy Hart
- April 4:
  - Tiger Jeet Singh
  - El Sicodélico
- April 20 – Bob Bruggers (died in 2024)
- May 25 - Victor Rivera (wrestler)
- May 29 – Ronnie P. Gossett(died in 2007)
- June 1 – Diamond Lil
- June 30 – Terry Funk(died in 2023)
- July 12 – Ric Drasin (died in 2020)
- August 3 – Roland Bock (died in 2025)
- August 10 – Jim Crockett Jr.(died in 2021)
- August 14 – Bobby Duncum Sr.(died in 2026)
- August 24 – Rocky Johnson(died in 2020)
- August 31 – Jos LeDuc(died in 1999)
- September 12 – Lonnie Mayne(died in 1978)
- October 4 – Michel Martel(died in 1978)
- October 21:
  - Jonathan Boyd(died in 1999)
  - Butch Miller(died in 2023)
- October 31 - Roy Callender
- November 1:
  - Bobby Heenan(died in 2017)
  - Bugsy McGraw
- November 2 – Michael Buffer

== Deaths ==
- January 29 – Jim Clintstock (39)
- April 30 – Ernst Roeber (72)
- September 9 – Gus Sonnenberg (46)
