= 1939 in professional wrestling =

1939 in professional wrestling describes the year's events in the world of professional wrestling.

== List of notable promotions ==
Only one promotion held notable shows in 1939.

Promotion Name	Abbreviation
Empresa Mexicana de Lucha Libre	EMLL

== Calendar of notable shows ==
Date	Promotion(s)	Event	Location	Main event
September 19	EMLL	EMLL 6th Anniversary Show	Mexico City, Mexico	Bobby Arreola defeated Ciclón Veloz in a tournament final for the vacant Mexican National Welterweight Championship

== Championship changes ==
=== EMLL ===
NWA World Middleweight Championship
New
Date	Winner	Event/Show	Note(s)
Uncertain	Gus Kallio	N/A	Awarded the championship because he already held the World Middleweight Championship in the United States.
February 19	Octavio Gaona	EMLL show	

Mexican National Heavyweight Championship
incoming champion - Francisco Aguayo
No title changes

Mexican National Middleweight Championship
incoming champion – Firpo Segura
Date	Winner	Event/Show	Note(s)
Uncertain	Octavio Gaona	EMLL show	
February 9	Tarzán López	EMLL show	

Mexican National Lightweight Championship
incoming champion – Jack O'Brien
No title changes

Mexican National Welterweight Championship
incoming champion – Tarzán López
Date	Winner	Event/Show	Note(s)
Uncertain	Vacated	N/A	Championship vacated for undocumented reasons

Mexican National Featherweight Championship
incoming champion - Luis Robles
No title changes

== Debuts ==
- Debut date uncertain:
  - Gladys Gillem
  - Mae Young
- July 4 – Buddy Rogers

== Births ==
- February 9 – Espectro I(died in 1993)
- February 13 – Lumberjack Pierre
- February 26 – Chuck Wepner
- February 28 – Dewey Robertson(died in 2007)
- March 1 – Adnan Al-Kaissie(died in 2023)
- March 7 – George Hultz
- March 13 – Rodolfo Ruíz (died in 2025)
- March 14 – Lars Anderson
- March 20 – Paul Christy(died in 2021)
- March 24 – Jim Herd
- May 5 – Bill Watts
- June 8 – Tinieblas Sr.
- June 20 – Ramona Isbella
- August 8 – Michael Okpala (died in 2004)
- October 3 – Bob Armstrong(died in 2020)
- October 4 – Gene Anderson(died in 1991)
- October 20 – Gil Hayes (died in 2022)
- November 1 – Fred Peloquin
- December 14 – Roger Kirby(died in 2019)
- December 25 – Ivan Gomes (died in 1990)

== Deaths ==
- March 11 – William Miller (Australian athlete) (92)
