= 1941 in professional wrestling =

1941 in professional wrestling describes the year's events in the world of professional wrestling.

== List of notable promotions ==
Only one promotion held notable shows in 1941.

Promotion Name	Abbreviation
Empresa Mexicana de Lucha Libre	EMLL

== Calendar of notable shows ==
Date	Promotion(s)	Event	Location	Main Event
September 25	EMLL	EMLL 8th Anniversary Show	Mexico City, Mexico	Mike London (c) defeated Gorilla Ramos in a best two-out-of-three falls for the Mexican National Junior Heavyweight Championship
(c) – denotes defending champion(s)

== Championship changes ==
=== EMLL ===
NWA World Middleweight Championship
incoming champion – Tarzán López
Date	Winner	Event/Show	Note(s)
December 16	Black Guzmán	EMLL show	

Mexican National Heavyweight Championship
incoming champion - Firpo Segura
No title changes

Mexican National Middleweight Championship
incoming champion – Tarzán López
Date	Winner	Event/Show	Note(s)
May 12	Black Guzmán	EMLL show	
December 16	Vacated	N/A	Championship vacated after Guzmán won the NWA World Middleweight Championship

Mexican National Lightweight Championship
incoming champion – Dientes Hernandez
No title changes

Mexican National Welterweight Championship
incoming champion – Vacant
Date	Winner	Event/Show	Note(s)
April 6	Lobo Negro	EMLL show	
November 23	Jack O'Brien	EMLL show	

Mexican National Featherweight Championship
incoming champion - Luis Robles
Date	Winner	Event/Show	Note(s)
1941	Vacated	N/A	Robles died in an automobile accident

== Debuts ==
- Debut date uncertain:
  - Yukon Eric

== Births ==
- Date of birth uncertain:
  - Jarochita Rivero(died in 2006)
  - Rocket Monroe(died in 2010)
- January 11 – Abdullah the Butcher
- January 19 – Pat Patterson(died in 2020)
- January 21 – Ivan Putski
- January 22 – Tony Parisi(died in 2000)
- January 24:
  - Teruo Takahashi
  - Klaus Kauroff (died in 2020)
- January 27 – Cuban Assassin
- February 3 – Dory Funk Jr. (died in 2026)
- March 2 – Charlie Cook (died in 2020)
- April 11 - Buddy Wolfe (died in 2017)
- May 17 – Mike Pappas (died in 2022)
- May 18 – Gino Brito
- June 8 – Paul Peller
- June 29 – Johnny Saint
- June 30 – Rusher Kimura(died in 2010)
- July 5 – Little Tokyo(died in 2011)
- July 8
  - Thunderbolt Patterson
  - Jerry Valiant (died in 2010)
- July 20 - Don Chuy (died in 2014)
- July 25 - Norman Frederick Charles III (died in 2019)
- September 15 - Verne Langdon (died in 2011)
- September 21 – Jack Brisco(died in 2010)
- October 15 - John Quinn (died in 2019)
- October 16 - Bob Leonard (died in 2016)
- October 19 – Peter Thornley
- October 30 - Kotetsu Yamamoto (died in 2010)
- December 18 - Motoshi Okuma (died in 1992)

== Deaths ==
- January 31 – Alfred Albert Joe de Re la Gardiur (59)
- October 12 – Buddy O'Brien (31)
