= 1952 in professional wrestling =

1952 in professional wrestling describes the year's events in the world of professional wrestling.

== List of notable promotions ==
Only one promotion held notable shows in 1952.

Promotion Name	Abbreviation
Empresa Mexicana de Lucha Libre	EMLL

== Calendar of notable shows ==
Date	Promotion(s)	Event	Location	Main event
September 26	EMLL	EMLL 19th Anniversary Show	Mexico City, Mexico	El Santo defeated Bobby Bonales (c) in a best two-out-of-three falls match for the NWA World Welterweight Championship
(c) – denotes defending champion(s)

== Championship changes ==
=== EMLL ===
NWA World Middleweight Championship
incoming champion – Enrique Llanes
Date	Winner	Event/Show	Note(s)
February 3	Vacant	N/A	Championship vacated for undocumented reasons
June 13	Tarzán López	EMLL show	Won a tournament

NWA World Welterweight Championship
incoming champion – Bobby Bonales
Date	Winner	Event/Show	Note(s)
September 26	El Santo	EMLL show	

Mexican National Heavyweight Championship
incoming champion - Daniel Aldana
Date	Winner	Event/Show	Note(s)
Uncertain	Firpo Segura	EMLL show	

Mexican National Middleweight Championship
incoming champion – Uncertain
No title changes

Mexican National Lightweight Championship
incoming champion – Black Shadow
No title changes

Mexican National Light Heavyweight Championship
incoming champion – Vacant
No title changes

Mexican National Welterweight Championship
incoming champion - El Santo
No title changes

=== NWA ===
NWA Worlds Heavyweight Championship
Incoming Champion – Lou Thesz
Date	Winner	Event/Show	Note(s)
No title changes

== Debuts ==
- Debut date uncertain:
  - Shirley Crabtree
  - Brute Bernard
  - Espanto II
  - Fritz Von Erich
  - Jackie Fargo
  - John Tolos
  - Ray Stevens
  - Ricky Romero
  - Waldo Von Erich
  - Don Fargo
- February 13 – Gene Kiniski
- September 23 - Tony Borne

== Retirements ==
- The Great Gama (1895–1952)

== Births ==
- January 3 – Jim Ross
- March 2 – Sandy Parker (died in 2022)
- March 23 – Villano III(died in 2018)
- May 14 – Scott Irwin(died in 1987)
- May 21 – Mr. T
- June 6 – Moondog Spot (died in 2003)
- June 19 – El Canek
- June 20 – Benny Urquidez
- June 27 – Randy Hogan
- June 30 – Nightmare Danny Davis
- July 5 – Hillbilly Jim
- August 4 – Dick the Brusier Jr.
- September 3 – Black Terry (died in 2025)
- September 6 – Javier Llanes
- September 12 – Silo Sam (died in 2005)
- September 14 – Bobo Brazil Jr.
- September 15 – Greg Boyd
- September 19 – Paco Alonso(died in 2019)
- September 22:
  - Gran Cochisse
  - Américo Rocca
- September 25 – Jimmy Garvin
- October 6 – Rip Oliver (died in 2020)
- October 14 – Dan Spivey
- November 4 –Larry Cameron(died in 1993)
- November 9 – Joyce Grable (died in 2023)
- November 15 – Randy Savage(died in 2011)
- November 19
  - Ricky Gibson (died in 2006)
  - Wayne Hart
- November 22 – George Weingeroff
- November 27 – Buddy Rose(died in 2009)
- November 29 – Jules Strongbow
- December 12 – Gary Michael Cappetta
- December 13 – Junkyard Dog(died in 1998)

== Deaths ==
- June 13- Alex Kasaboski, 41
- December 25- Charles Cutler (wrestler), 68
