= 1933 in professional wrestling =

1933 in professional wrestling describes that year's events in the world of professional wrestling.

== List of notable promotions ==
Only one promotion held notable shows in 1933.

| Promotion Name | Abbreviation | Notes |
|---|---|---|
| Empresa Mexicana de Lucha Libre | EMLL | Founded this year with first show held in September. |

== Calendar of notable shows ==
| Date | Promotion(s) | Event | Location | Main event |
|---|---|---|---|---|
| September 21 | EMLL | Debut show | Mexico City, Mexico | Yaqui Joe defeated Bobby Sampson |

== Notable events ==
- The nation's top wrestling promoters, including Toots Mondt, Jack Curley, Paul Bowser, Tom Packs, Jess McMahon and others create a new trust, a precursor to the National Wrestling Alliance
- February 9 - Ed Don George defeats Henri Deglane to win the AWA version of the World Heavyweight Championship in Boston
- September 21 – promoter Salvador Lutteroth holds the first Empresa Mexicana de Lucha Libre (EMLL; "Mexican Wrestling Enterprise") show in Mexico City.

== Title changes ==
=== EMLL ===
Mexican National Heavyweight Championship
Incoming champion – Uncertain
No title changes

Mexican National Middleweight Championship
(Title created)
| Date | Winner | Event/Show | Note(s) |
| Uncertain | Yaqui Joe | EMLL Show | |

== Debuts ==
- Debut date uncertain
  - Erik Malmberg
  - Jack O'Brien
- February 20 – Bronko Nagurski
- September 23 – Dientes Hernández

== Births ==
- Date uncertain
  - Ann Lake
  - Keita Meretana
  - Max Crabtree (d. 2023)
  - Espanto I (d. 1968)
  - Randhawa (d. 2013)
- January 4 – René Guajardo (d. 1992)
- January 6 – Mike Lane (d, 2015)
- January 12 – Ray Stern (d. 2007)
- January 27 – Al Zinck (d. 2024)
- February 16 – Rod Trongard (d. 2005)
- March 13 – Sam Betts (died in 2024)
- March 20 – Frank Townsend (died in 1965)
- March 27 – Swede Hanson (d. 2002)
- April 4 – Stan Holek (d. 2015)
- April 18 – Tank Morgan (d. 1991)
- May 26 – Silento Rodriguez (d. 2024)
- June 12 – Eric Pomeroy (died in 2012)
- June 13 – Janet Wolfe (d. 1951)
- June 16 – Sweet Daddy Siki (died in 2024)
- June 24 – Don Kent (d. 1993)
- June 28 – Boris Malenko (d. 1994)
- July 4 – Rufus R. Jones (d. 1993)
- July 29 – Lou Albano (d. 2009)
- August 13 – Jack Lotz (d. 2020)
- August 29 – Dale Lewis (d. 1997)
- September 2 – Rubén Peucelle (d. 2014)
- September 16 – Dick Brower (d. 1997)
- September 28 – Dick Steinborn (d. 2020)
- October 2 – Waldo Von Erich (d. 2009)
- October 11 – Ripper Collins (d. 1991)
- December 2 – Gypsy Joe (d. 2016)

== Deaths ==
- April 19 – Ben Roller (56)
- June 3 – William Muldoon (81)
- July 13 – George Kotsonaros (40)
- August 5 – Fred Beell (57)
- November 10 – Wladyslaw Pytlasinski (70)
