= 1955 in professional wrestling =

1955 in professional wrestling describes the year's events in the world of professional wrestling.

== List of notable promotions ==
Only one promotion held notable shows in 1955.

Promotion Name	Abbreviation
Empresa Mexicana de Lucha Libre	EMLL

== Calendar of notable shows ==
Date	Promotion(s)	Event	Location	Main event
September 16	EMLL	EMLL 22nd Anniversary Show	Mexico City, Mexico	El Santo (c) defeated Black Shadow in a best two-out-of-three falls match for the NWA World Middleweight Championship
December 2	EMLL	Juicio Final	Mexico City, Mexico	El Santo vs. Halcón Negro in a Lucha de Apuestas, mask Vs. mask match
(c) – denotes defending champion(s)

== Championship changes ==
=== EMLL ===
NWA World Middleweight Championship
incoming champion – El Santo
No title changes

NWA World Welterweight Championship
incoming champion – Blue Demon
No title changes

Mexican National Heavyweight Championship
incoming champion - Joaquin Murrieta
Date	Winner	Event/Show	Note(s)
March 15	Vacant	N/A	Vacated for undocumented reasons

Mexican National Middleweight Championship
incoming champion – Vacant
No title changes

Mexican National Lightweight Championship
incoming champion – Vacant
No title changes

Mexican National Light Heavyweight Championship
incoming champion – Vacant
No title changes

Mexican National Welterweight Championship
incoming champion – Vacant
No title changes

Mexican National Women's Championship
New
Date	Winner	Event/Show	Note(s)
Uncertain	La Dama Enmascarada	EMLL show	Won a tournament to become the first women's champion.
February 28	Irma González	EMLL show	

=== NWA ===
NWA Worlds Heavyweight Championship
Incoming Champion – Lou Thesz
Date	Winner	Event/Show	Note(s)
No title changes

== Debuts ==
- Debut date uncertain:
  - Billy Robinson
  - Boris Malenko
  - King Curtis Iaukea
  - Estrella Blanca
  - The Spoiler
  - Sweet Daddy Siki
  - Don McClarty
  - Miyuki Yanagi (All Japan Women's Pro Wrestling Association)
  - Yukiko Tomoe (All Japan Women's Pro Wrestling Association)
  - Reiko Yoshiba (All Japan Women's Pro Wrestling Association)
- March 27 – Chabela Romero
- July 1 – Butcher Vachon
- October 10 – Emile Dupre
- October 12 – Gene LeBell

== Births ==
- February 8 – Jim Neidhart(died in 2018)
- February 10 – Chris Adams(died in 2001)
- February 18 – Raymond Rougeau
- February 24 – Pierre Lefebvre(died in 1985)
- February 28 – The Commandant
- March 1 – Mike Tenay
- March 19 – Rick McGraw(died in 1985)
- March 30 – Gerard Gordeau
- April 30 – José Luis Feliciano
- May 14 – Vader(died in 2018)
- May 16 – Psycho Sam Cody
- May 27 – Eric Bischoff
- May 30 – Jake Roberts
- June 1 – David Schultz
- June 4 – Precious
- June 16 – Drew McDonald(died in 2015)
- June 17 – Ultra Seven
- June 19 – Tod Gordon
- June 21 – Jay Youngblood(died in 1985)
- July 9 – Herb Abrams (died in 1996)
- July 18 – Iron Mike Steele (died in 2007)
- July 26 – Rocky Santana
- August 11 – Norio Honaga
- August 12 – Terry Taylor
- September 8 – Jerry Balisok (died in 2013)
- September 9 – Winona Littleheart (died in 2020)
- September 15 – Al Greene(died in 2013)
- September 20 – Johnny Kidd
- September 29 – Mile Zrno
- October 8 – Judy Martin
- October 10 – Cachorro Mendoza
- November 12 – Hubert Gallant
- November 17 – Ted Allen(died in 2010)
- December 16 – Eddy Steinblock (died in 2017)
- December 17 – Spike Huber
- December 29 – Pantera Sureña

== Deaths ==
- September 5 – George Tragos (59)
- October 12 – Bernarr Macfadden (87)
