= Jim Clintstock =

American professional wrestler (1904–1944)

Personal information
- Born: Howard Clay Clinkscale; December 29, 1904 Olathe, Kansas, U.S.
- Died: January 29, 1944 (aged 39) Charlotte, North Carolina, U.S.
- Family: Clifton Clinstock (brother)

Professional wrestling career
- Ring name(s): Jim Clintstock; Jim Clinstock; Jim Clinkstock; Harold Clinkscale; Masked Marvel
- Billed height: 6 ft 4 in (1.93 m)
- Billed weight: 231 lb (105 kg)
- Trained by: Freddie Knichel
- Debut: 1927

Howard Clay Clinkscale (December 29, 1904 – January 29, 1944), better known by the ring name "Big" Jim Clintstock, was an American professional wrestler. He was the older brother of wrestler Clifton Clinstock.

== Career ==
Clintstock made his debut in 1927. Billed as a Cherokee wrestling star, his flying scissors was a formidable finishing move. During the 1930s, he made several appearances for the Eastern States Championship Wrestling and Jim Crockett Promotions.

== Death ==
Clinstock died on January 29, 1944, when he was allegedly killed during a dispute with two men at a dentist's office in Charlotte, North Carolina.

== Championships and accomplishments ==
- Championship Wrestling from Florida
  - NWA Florida Heavyweight Championship (1 time)

== Luchas de Apuestas record ==
Winner (wager)	Loser (wager)	Location	Event	Date	Notes
Alf Johnson	The Masked Marvel (mask)	Bristol, Virginia	Live event	September 1, 1938	(Note: This was a Best 2-out-of-3 Falls match.)
Alf Johnson	The Masked Marvel (mask)	Roanoke, Virginia	Live event	September 6, 1938	
