= 1934 in professional wrestling =

Newsreel footage of a professional wrestling match between Man Mountain Dean and "Jumping" Joe Savoldi in Los Angeles in 1934

1934 in professional wrestling describes the year's events in the world of professional wrestling.

== List of notable promotions ==
Only one promotion held notable shows in 1934.

Promotion Name	Abbreviation
Empresa Mexicana de Lucha Libre	EMLL

== Calendar of notable shows ==
Date	Promotion(s)	Event	Location	Main Event
September 21	EMLL	EMLL 1st Anniversary Show	Mexico City, Mexico	La Maravilla Enmascarada defeated Frank Gou

== Championship changes ==
=== EMLL ===
Mexican National Heavyweight Championship
incoming champion – Uncertain
Date	Winner	Event/Show	Note(s)
June 21	Francisco Aguayo	EMLL show	

Mexican National Middleweight Championship
incoming champion – Uncertain
No title changes

Mexican National Lightweight Championship
New
Date	Winner	Event/Show	Note(s)
June 28	Jack O'Brien	EMLL show	Defeated Dientes Hernandez in the finals of a tournament

Mexican National Welterweight Championship
New
Date	Winner	Event/Show	Note(s)
June 17	Mario Nuñez	EMLL show	Defeated Tony Canales to become the first champion

== Debuts ==
- Debut date uncertain:
  - Bobby Bonales
- January 28 – Firpo Segura
- April 5 – Lou Thesz
- April 12 – Tarzán López
- June 28 – El Santo
- October – Octavio Gaona

== Retirements ==
- Retirement date uncertain:
  - Joe Stecher

== Births ==
- Date of birth uncertain:
  - Karl Von Steiger (died in 2022)
- January 2 – Alberto Torres (wrestler)(died in 1971)
- February 2 – Dory Dixon
- March 3 – Bobby Fields(died in 2011)
- April 2 – Brian Glover (died in 1997)
- April 6 – Anton Geesink (died in 2010)
- April 9 – Les Thornton(died in 2019)
- April 18 – Little Beaver(died in 1995)
- April 19 – Ox Baker(died in 2014)
- May 4 – Sam Steamboat(died in 2006)
- May 5 – Mr. Fuji(died in 2016)
- May 13 – Killer Karl Krupp(died in 1995)
- May 27 – Sandy Scott(died in 2010)
- June 9 – Don Manoukian(died in 2014)
- June 11 – John da Silva (died in 2021)
- June 18 – Great Goliath(died in 2004)
- June 27 – Don Robinson (died in 2025)
- July 3 – Armand Hussein(died in 2007)
- July 7 – Tomás Marín (died in 2018)
- July 23 – Louie Tillet (died in 2024)
- July 28 – Mr. Wrestling (died in 2002)
- August 1 – Eric the Red (died in 1978)
- August 3 – Haystacks Calhoun(died in 1989)
- August 11 – Penny Banner(died in 2008)
- August 19 – Bob Konovsky (died in 1982)
- August 27 – Reggie Parks(died in 2021)
- September 10 –
  - Jerry Kozak (died in 2014)
  - Mr. Wrestling II(died in 2020)
- September 29 – Skandar Akbar(died in 2010)
- October 24 – Sapphire(died in 1996)
- November 20 – Don Carson(died in 2013)
- December 6 – Nick Bockwinkel(died in 2015)
- December 12 – José Lothario(died in 2018)

== Deaths ==
- January 3 – Alex Munro, 63
