= 1950 in professional wrestling =

1950 in professional wrestling describes the year's events in the world of professional wrestling.

== List of notable promotions ==
Only one promotion held notable shows in 1950.

Promotion Name	Abbreviation
Empresa Mexicana de Lucha Libre	EMLL

== Calendar of notable shows ==
Date	Promotion(s)	Event	Location	Main Event
September 21	EMLL	EMLL 17th Anniversary Show	Mexico City, Mexico	Sugi Sito defeated Tarzán López (c) in a best two-out-of-three falls match for the NWA World Middleweight Championship
(c) – denotes defending champion(s)

== Championship changes ==
=== EMLL ===
NWA World Middleweight Championship
Incoming champion – Tarzán López
Date	Winner	Event/Show	Note(s)
September 21	Sugi Sito	EMLL 17th Anniversary Show	

NWA World Welterweight Championship
Incoming champion – Gory Guerrero
No title changes

Mexican National Heavyweight Championship
Incoming champion - Daniel Aldana
No title changes

Mexican National Middleweight Championship
Incoming champion – Uncertain
No title changes

Mexican National Welterweight Championship
Incoming champion – Vacant
Date	Winner	Event/Show	Note(s)
Uncertain	El Santo	EMLL show	

Mexican National Light Heavyweight Championship
Incoming champion – Cavernario Galindo
Date	Winner	Event/Show	Note(s)
December	Enrique Llanes	EMLL show	

=== NWA ===
NWA Worlds Heavyweight Championship
Incoming Champion – Lou Thesz
Date	Winner	Event/Show	Note(s)
No title changes

== Debuts ==
- Debut date uncertain:
  - Bob Geigel
  - Bob Orton Sr.
  - Dick the Bruiser
  - Don Curtis
  - Don Kent
  - Hard Boiled Haggerty
  - Karloff Lagarde
  - Lenny Montana
  - Little Beaver
  - Lord Alfred Hayes
  - Médico Asesino
  - Missouri Mauler
  - Rayo de Jalisco Sr.
- March 21 – Leo Nomellini
- April 4 – Iron Mike DiBiase
- August 3 – Don Leo Jonathan
- September 14 – Pat O'Connor

== Births ==
- January 5 – Bobby Kay(died in 2020)
- January 13 – Bruce Hart
- January 18 – Kahoz
- February 2
  - Osamu Kido (died in 2023)
  - Genichiro Tenryu
- March 20 - Al Madril
- April 15 - Bobby Lee (Mexican wrestler) (died in 2020)
- April 28 - Jay Leno
- May 2
  - Moondog Rex(died in 2019)
  - Don Kernodle (died in 2021)
- May 29 – Kamala(died in 2020)
- May 31 – Moondog Spike (died in 2013)
- June 2 – Ron Mikolajczyk
- June 7 – Howard Finkel(died in 2020)
- June 9 – Mando Guerrero
- June 11 – King Parsons
- June 13 – Chris Taylor(died in 1979)
- June 28 – Villano I (died in 2001)
- July 10 – Shota Chochishvili (died in 2009)
- July 14 – Hercules Ayala(died in 2020)
- July 18 – Shahid Khan
- August 1 – Jimmy Golden
- August 5 – Goldie Rogers (died in 2012)
- August 25 – Jesse Hernandez
- August 28 – Cowboy Lang (died in 2007)
- September 10 – Vivian St. John (died in 2013)
- October 10 – Gene Ligon
- October 18 – Bob Bradley
- November 1 – Ray Richard (died in 2025)
- November 10 – Bob Orton Jr.
- November 13 – The Great Wojo (died in 2025)
- November 16 – Harvey Martin (died in 2001)
- November 27 – Gran Hamada (died in 2025)
- November 30 – Leroy Brown(died in 1988)
- December 13 – Steve Travis (died in 2018)
- December 18 – Lizmark (died in 2015)

== Deaths ==
- August 25 – Earl Caddock (62)
- November 4 – Danno O'Mahony (38)
