= Dick Cardinal =

American professional wrestler (1927–2020)

Personal information
- Born: Richard Cardinal; July 10, 1927 Everett, Washington, U.S.
- Died: December 24, 2020 (aged 93) Marysville, Washington, U.S.

Professional wrestling career
- Ring name: Dick Cardinal
- Billed height: 5 ft 7 in (170 cm)
- Billed weight: 180 lb (82 kg)
- Debut: 1940s
- Retired: 1982

Richard Glen Cardinal (July 10, 1927 – December 24, 2020) was an American professional wrestler who was known for his shoot style of wrestling.

== Early life ==
Cardinal began an Amateur Wrestling career at the age of 10, when he was scouted outside a gym where a local meet was being held, and they required a spot to be filled in.

== Professional wrestling career ==
Cardinal was trained for the carnival by August Sepp who was a Russian hooker, and with the help of Benny Sherman, Vic Short, and Bud Anderson he became arguably the greatest hook wrestler. Cardinal made his wrestling debut in 1940s. He would spend of his career for Pacific Northwest Wrestling and NWA All-Star Wrestling in Vancouver, Canada.

Wicks retired from wrestling in 1975. However, he returned to wrestling in 1982 under a mask as the Nightmare Cowboy to help out a friend’s promotion in Montana.

== Death ==
Cardinal died on Christmas Eve 2020 at 93.
