= 1956 in professional wrestling =

1956 in professional wrestling describes the year's events in the world of professional wrestling.

== List of notable promotions ==
Only one promotion held notable shows in 1956.

Promotion Name	Abbreviation
Empresa Mexicana de Lucha Libre	EMLL

== Calendar of notable shows ==
Date	Promotion(s)	Event	Location	Main Event
April	EMLL	Arena Coliseo 13th Anniversary Show	Mexico City, Mexico	Uncertain
September 21	EMLL	EMLL 23rd Anniversary Show	Mexico City, Mexico	El Santo defeated El Gladiador in a best two-out-of-three falls Lucha de Apuesta mask vs. mask match

== Notable events ==
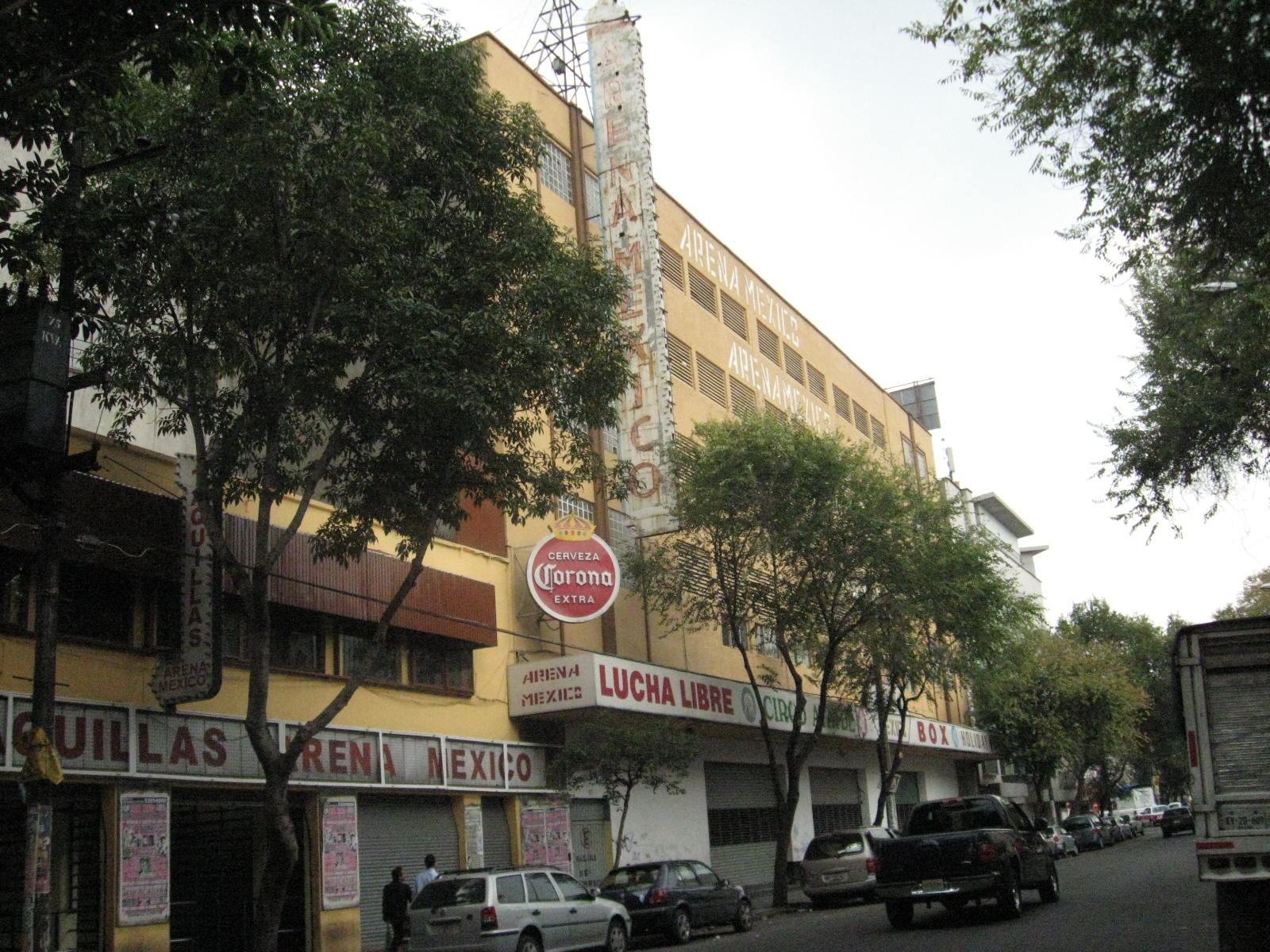
Arena Mexico as seen from Calle Dr Lavista.

- January 6 - Heavyweight Wrestling debuts in the Northeast as the main television program of the Capitol Wrestling Corporation based from Turner's Arena in Washington, DC.
- April – Arena México opens, built by Empresa Mexicana de Lucha Libre (EMLL; "Mexican Wrestling Enterprise") owner Salvador Lutteroth. Arena México became EMLL's main venue from that point forward and is referred to as the Cathedral of Lucha Libre.

== Championship changes ==
=== EMLL ===
NWA World Middleweight Championship
Incoming champion – El Santo
Date	Winner	Event/Show	Note(s)
October 19	Rolando Vera	EMLL show	

NWA World Welterweight Championship
Incoming champion – Blue Demon
No title changes

Mexican National Heavyweight Championship
Incoming champion – vacant
Date	Winner	Event/Show	Note(s)
September 7	El Médico Asesino	EMLL show	

Mexican National Lightweight Championship
Incoming champion –vacant
No title changes

Mexican National Light Heavyweight Championship
Incoming champion – vacant
Date	Winner	Event/Show	Note(s)
September 9	Tarzán López	EMLL show	

Mexican National Middleweight Championship
Incoming champion – vacant
Date	Winner	Event/Show	Note(s)
September 14	El Santo	EMLL show	

Mexican National Welterweight Championship
Incoming champion – vacant
Date	Winner	Event/Show	Note(s)
October 5	Jalisco Gonzalez	EMLL show	

Mexican National Women's Championship
Incoming champion – Irma Gonzales
Date	Winner	Event/Show	Note(s)
July 1	Rosita Williams	EMLL show	

=== NWA ===
NWA Worlds Heavyweight Championship
Incoming champion – Lou Thesz
Date	Winner	Event/Show	Note(s)
March 15	Whipper Billy Watson	NWA show	Won the championship by count out
November 9	Lou Thesz	NWA show	

== Debuts ==
- Debut date uncertain:
  - Sandy Barr
  - Jody Hamilton
  - Smasher Sloan
  - Mr. Wrestling II

== Retirements ==
- Mildred Burke (1935-1956)
- Jim Londos (1912-1956)

== Births ==
- January 10 – Denny Brown
- January 11 – Kuniaki Kobayashi(died in 2024)
- March 18 – Rick Martel
- March 21 – Angel Gabriele (died in 2016)
- March 23 – Ryuma Go (died in 2009)
- March 24 – Teijo Khan (died in 2020)
- March 28 – Dangerous Danny Davis
- April 5 – Diamond Dallas Page
- April 14 – Larry Winters (died in 2015)
- April 21 – Vicky Williams
- May 7 – Hercules(died in 2004)
- May 9 – Frank Andersson(died in 2018)
- May 11:
- Espanto Jr.
- Sunny War Cloud
- May 14 – Kasavubu (d. 1982)
- May 24 – Super Parka
- May 25:
  - Tatsutoshi Goto
  - El Solar
- June 4 – Joe Malenko
- July 13 – Tiger Jackson
- July 19:
  - Randy Rose
  - Yoshiaki Yatsu
- July 26 – Tommy Rich
- July 28 – Jimmy Jackson (wrestler) (died in 2008)
- August 8 – Taras Bulba(died in 2016)
- August 10 – Fred Ottman
- September 16 – Kazuharu Sonoda(died in 1987)
- September 18 – Súper Kendo
- September 21 – Ricky Morton
- September 26 – Richard Charland
- October 12 – Emilio Charles Jr. (died in 2012)
- October 22 – Bob Ryder (died in 2020)
- November 2 – Mike Davis(died in 2001)
- November 3 – Korstia Korchenko
- November 6 – Tony Rumble(died in 1999)
- November 10 – Hiroshi Shimada
- November 12 – Billy Anderson (wrestler)
- November 20 – Momma Benjamin
- December 20 – Super Strong Machine
- December 27 – Masashi Aoyagi (died in 2022)
- December 31 – MS-1(died in 2012)

== Deaths ==
- May 19 – Jack Taylor (Canadian wrestler) (69)
