= 1947 in professional wrestling =

1947 in professional wrestling describes the year's events in the world of professional wrestling.

== Gallery ==
Video footage of professional wrestling in 1947
Footage of a match between Fred Atkins and Laverne Baxter at Sydney Stadium in 1947

Footage of a match between Aktins and Chief Little Wolf, also in Sydney in 1947

== List of notable promotions ==
Only one promotion held notable shows in 1947.

| Promotion Name | Abbreviation |
|---|---|
| Empresa Mexicana de Lucha Libre | EMLL |

== Calendar of notable shows ==
| Date | Promotion(s) | Event | Location | Main event |
|---|---|---|---|---|
| September 24 | EMLL | EMLL 14th Anniversary Show | Mexico City, Mexico | Gory Guerrero (c) defeated Rito Romero in a best two-out-of-three falls match for the NWA World Middleweight Championship |
(c) – denotes defending champion(s)

== Championship changes ==
=== EMLL ===
NWA World Middleweight Championship
incoming champion – Gory Guerrero
No title changes

NWA World Welterweight Championship
incoming champion – El Santo
| Date | Winner | Event/Show | Note(s) |
| February 15 | Jack O'Brien | show | |

Mexican National Heavyweight Championship
incoming champion - Steve Morgan
| Date | Winner | Event/Show | Note(s) |
| March 22 | Firpo Segura | EMLL show | |

Mexican National Middleweight Championship
incoming champion – Tarzán López
No title changes

Mexican National Lightweight Championship
incoming champion – Emilio Charles
No title changes

Mexican National Light Heavyweight Championship
incoming champion – Black Guzmán
| Date | Winner | Event/Show | Note(s) |
| April 12 | Tarzán López | EMLL show | |

Mexican National Welterweight Championship
incoming champion – Vacant or El Santo
No title changes

== Debuts ==
- Debut date uncertain:
  - Adolfo Moreno
  - Chief Jay Strongbow
  - Eddie Graham
  - Dr. Jerry Graham
  - Johnny Valentine
- October 9 – Sky Low Low

== Births ==
- Date of birth uncertain:
  - B. J. Annis
  - Butts Giraud
  - Jake Milliman
  - Gilles Poisson
- January 2 – Samoan Joe (died in 2015)
- January 8
  - Ashura Hara(died in 2015)
  - Luke Williams
- January 26 – Raúl Mata(died in 2018)
- February 9 – Alexis Smirnoff (died in 2019)
- February 23 – Bobby Bass
- March 6 – Killer Khan (died in 2023)
- March 7 – Chick Donovan
- March 28 – Tony St. Clair
- April 2 – Ron Pritchard
- April 26 – Larry Matysik (died in 2018)
- May 1 – Samson Kutsuwada (died in 2004)
- June 16 – Buddy Roberts(died in 2012)
- June 28 – Jack Armstrong (died in 2026)
- July 9 – Tommy Young
- July 14 – Ultramán
- July 19 – Frenchy Martin (died in 2016)
- July 23 – El Halcón
- August 28 – El Cobarde(died in 1983)
- August 31 – Animal Hamaguchi
- September 15 – Teddy Long
- October 5 – El Faraón
- October 14 – Nikolai Volkoff(died in 2018)
- October 22 – Porkchop Cash
- October 30 – George Wells (died in 2020)
- December 4 – Killer Tim Brooks (died in 2020)
- December 27 – Bill Eadie
