= Mike Jackson (wrestler) =

American wrestler (born 1949)

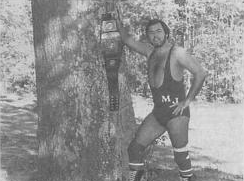
- Jackson as Alabama Junior Heavywieght champion, c. 1984

Personal information
- Born: Michael Jackson; November 10, 1949 (age 76) Birmingham, Alabama

Professional wrestling career
- Ring name: Mike Jackson
- Billed height: 5 ft 10 in (178 cm)
- Billed weight: 222 lb (101 kg)
- Debut: June 1972

Michael Jackson (born November 10, 1949), better known by his ring name Mike Jackson, is an American professional wrestler. who currently works for Total Nonstop Action Wrestling (TNA). He also makes appearances on the independent circuit. He also known for his During the 1970s and 1980s he worked for Georgia Championship Wrestling (GCW) and a short time with World Championship Wrestling (WCW) in the 1980s and early 1990s.

== Professional wrestling career ==
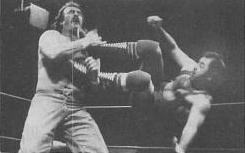
Jackson (right) dropkicks Jake Roberts, c. 1984

Jackson made his professional wrestling debut in June 1972. Early in his career he worked for NWA Mid-America and Southeast Championship Wrestling. In 1978 he made his debut for Georgia Championship Wrestling.

During his career he wrestled against Ric Flair, Carlos Colon and Bob Backlund. He also worked for American Wrestling Association, UWF Mid-South, World Wrestling Federation and Jim Crockett Promotions (which later became World Championship Wrestling) from 1984 to 1991.

He went into semi-retirement from wrestling in the early 1990s and made his last appearance in the 1993 Pro Wrestling Illustrated's Top 500 at 382.

In 1998, he wrestled for New Dimension Wrestling and then once again retired.

In 2005, he came out of retirement working for NWA Wrestle Birmingham and Peachstate Wrestling Alliance in Georgia.

On December 8, 2019, Jackson and Tommy Rich defeated 1 Called Manders and Mance Warner to win the WOMBAT tag team titles.

As of 2026, Jackson still wrestles in Georgia and Alabama.

=== Impact Wrestling / Total Nonstop Action Wrestling (2020, 2021–present) ===
On March 7, 2020, Jackson made his debut for Impact Wrestling at 70 years old losing to Johnny Swinger on a TV taping which aired April 14.

Jackson returned to Impact for one night only on December 18, 2021, teaming with Johnny Swinger as The Rhythmic Warriors as they defeated Kar Daniel Dunn and Chris Sabin. Jackson then participated in the Reverse Battle Royal at Slammiversary (2022) won by Shark Boy.

He wrestled in a 6-way scramble won by KUSHIDA at Hard To Kill (2023). The next night, he lost to Trey Miguel.

He wrestled on February 13, 2026, for Total Nonstop Action Wrestling as he lost to Mance Warner in Nashville, Tennessee.

== Championships and accomplishments ==
- Continental Championship Wrestling
  - CCW United States Junior Heavyweight Championship (2 times)
- Game Changer Wrestling
  - WOMBAT Tag Team Championship (1 time) - with Tommy Rich
- Global Championship Wrestling
  - Alabama Junior Heavyweight Championship (1 time)
- Memphis Wrestling
  - Junior Heritage Championship (1 time)
- Peachstate Wrestling Alliance
  - PWA Heritage Championship (3 times)
  - PWA Southern Cruiserweight Championship (1 time)
- Pro Wrestling Illustrated
  - PWI ranked Mike Jackson # 277 of the 500 best singles wrestlers of the PWI 500 in 1992
- Rocket City Championship Wrestling
  - RCCW World Heavyweight Championship (1 time)
- Spartan Pro Wrestling
  - Spartan Pro Heavyweight Championship (1 time)
  - United States Junior Heavyweight Championship (1 time)
- Wrestle Birmingham
  - Wrestle Birmingham Junior Heavyweight Championship (3 times)
  - NWA Wrestle Birmingham Junior Heavyweight Championship Tournament (2006)
