= Hard To Kill (2023) =

2023 Impact Wrestling pay-per-view event

- Promotional poster featuring Bully Ray and Josh Alexander
- Promotion: Impact Wrestling
- Date: January 13, 2023
- City: Atlanta, Georgia
- Venue: Center Stage
- Attendance: 550
- Buy rate: 3,900

Pay-per-view chronology
← Previous; Bound for Glory	Next → Multiverse United

Hard To Kill chronology
← Previous; 2022	Next → 2024

The 2023 Hard To Kill was a professional wrestling pay-per-view (PPV) event produced by Impact Wrestling. It took place on January 13, 2023, at the Center Stage in Atlanta, Georgia, and was the fourth event under the Hard To Kill chronology.

Ten matches took place at the event, including two on the pre-show and one taped as a digital exclusive. In the main event, Mickie James defeated Jordynne Grace to win the Impact Knockouts World Championship in a Title vs. Career match. In other prominent matches, Masha Slamovich defeated Deonna Purrazzo, Killer Kelly, and Taylor Wilde in a four-way match to become the number one contender to the Impact Knockouts World Championship, and Josh Alexander defeated Bully Ray in a Full Metal Mayhem match to retain the Impact World Championship in the opening bout. The event also featured the debut of Santino Marella as the Director of Authority, the return of PCO, special appearances by Raven and Tara, and the return of Frankie Kazarian, announcing his departure from All Elite Wrestling to sign a contract with Impact.

== Production ==
=== Background ===
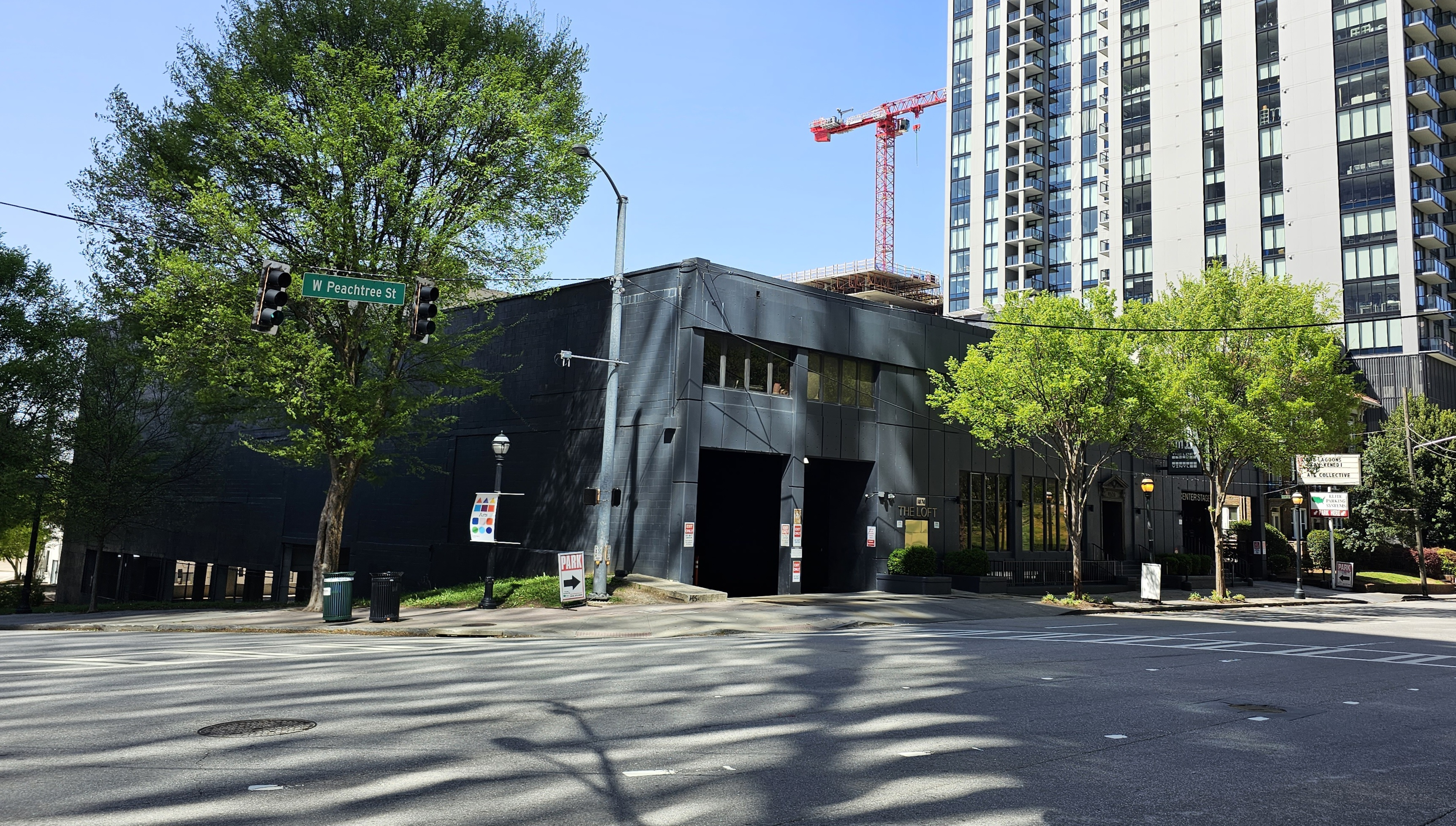
The event was held at the Center Stage in Atlanta, Georgia.

On October 7, 2022, at Bound for Glory, it was announced that Hard To Kill will take place on January 13, 2023, at the Center Stage in Atlanta, Georgia.

=== Storylines ===
The event featured several professional wrestling matches, which involve different wrestlers from pre-existing scripted feuds, plots, and storylines. Wrestlers portray heroes, villains, or less distinguishable characters in scripted events that build tension and culminate in a wrestling match or series of matches. Storylines are produced on Impact's weekly television program.

At Bound for Glory, Bully Ray returned to Impact Wrestling in the Call Your Shot Gauntlet, last eliminating Steve Maclin to win a championship match at the time and place of his choosing. Later that night, after Josh Alexander retained the Impact World Championship against Eddie Edwards, Edwards' Honor No More stable attacked Alexander. Ray suddenly emerged and looked to invoke his opportunity at that moment, only to then help Alexander run off Honor No More. The situation would be addressed on the subsequent episode of Impact!, where Alexander called out Ray. The latter would then explain that he wants to rewrite his legacy in Impact due to his past as someone who will do whatever it takes to achieve his goals, no matter who he betrays. As such, he promised Alexander that he will let him know when he will challenge him face-to-face. However, many in Impact did not believe Ray's change in attitude – save for Ray's friend Tommy Dreamer – still believing that he will take the first opportunity he can get to ambush Alexander. At Over Drive, Ray defeated Moose, someone who tried to paint Ray in his previous light, in a tables match. In the main event, Alexander retained his title against Frankie Kazarian. After that match, Ray would confront Alexander and invoked his opportunity at Hard To Kill, which Alexander accepted. Once Alexander left the ring, Ray attacked him and threatened to piledrive his wife Jen, who was sitting at ringside. The match would be announced for the main event of Hard To Kill. On the December 22 episode of Impact!, Alexander would be attacked by Ray, Jason Hotch, and John Skyler. Tommy Dreamer, Ray's former friend, tried to intervene, but Ray dispatched of him using a steel chair and ladder. Alexander would go to Impact Executive Vice President Scott D'Amore, demanding his match with Ray at Hard To Kill be upgraded to a Full Metal Mayhem match, which D'Amore made official.

After suffering a defeat from Chelsea Green on the July 14, 2022 episode of Impact!, Mickie James would leave the arena to return home, emotional and unsure about her future in professional wrestling. Several weeks later, on the September 1 episode of Impact!, James returned and announced her "Last Rodeo", a final retirement campaign towards an Impact Knockouts World Championship match where if she loses her next bout, she promised to retire from in-ring competition. James would go on to defeat the likes of Gisele Shaw, Mia Yim, Taylor Wilde, and Chelsea Green; the victory over Green causing the latter to leave in the same vein as James had done five months ago. On the December 1 episode of Impact!, James defeated longtime rival Deonna Purrazzo before being confronted by Knockouts World Champion Jordynne Grace, who would challenge James to a match at Hard To Kill. Impact would announce the match, making it a Title vs. Career match.

On the December 15 episode of Impact!, where Eddie Edwards defeated Delirious, Edwards attacked Delirious until the returning Jonathan Gresham made the save. Later on the episode, it was confirmed that Gresham would face Edwards at Hard To Kill.

On the Countdown to Over Drive pre-show, The Motor City Machine Guns (Alex Shelley and Chris Sabin) defeated Bullet Club members Ace Austin and Chris Bey to earn an Impact World Tag Team Championship match. Later on the main show, reigning champions Heath and Rhino successfully defended the titles against The Major Players (Brian Myers and Matt Cardona). On the December 8 episode of Impact!, Heath and Rhino defended the titles against The Motor City Machine Guns, but the match went to a no contest due to interference from The Major Players. The former two teams would have a rematch the following week, with Sabin pinning Rhino to earn the MCMG their third Impact World Tag Team Championship. The week after, The Motor City Machine Guns announced that they will defend their titles against Heath and Rhino, The Major Players, and the team of Austin and Bey - who recently made it to the finals of the Super Junior Tag League in New Japan Pro-Wrestling - in a four-way tag team elimination match at Hard To Kill.

At Over Drive, Trey Miguel defeated Black Taurus in the finals of a tournament to crown a new Impact X Division Champion, as the title was vacated by Frankie Kazarian via invoking Option C. However, Miguel won after spraying Taurus's eyes with a can of spray paint, turning heel in the process. Miguel would go onto defacing the title belt by tagging it with his logo, something he would do to his opponents thereafter. On the December 15 episode of Impact!, when Decay (Taurus and Crazzy Steve) were making their entrance for a tag team match, Miguel struck Steve with the spray paint can before tagging him, with the lingering effects causing Decay to lose to The Major Players. On the subsequent episode of Impact!, it was announced that Miguel and Taurus will have a rematch for the X Division Championship at Hard To Kill.

On December 29, Impact announced a three-way match between Deonna Purrazzo, Masha Slamovich, and Taylor Wilde to determine the next number one contender for the Knockouts World Championship. On January 5, Impact announced the addition of Killer Kelly into the match.

On the December 1, 2022 Impact!, Moose cut a promo after defeating Bhupinder Gujjar, saying he knew what Bully Ray's true intentions with the Call Your Shot Trophy were. He went on to say that he never wanted to hear Ray's name again, which inadvertently drew the attention of Impact Digital Media Champion Joe Hendry; believing that Moose wanted a title match. For the next several weeks, Moose would target Hendry, and Gujjar in association, telling both men to "believe in Moose." On December 29, Hendry would challenge Moose to a match for the Digital Media Championship at Hard To Kill, which Moose accepted and would be made official on January 3, 2023.

On January 6, Impact announced that on Countdown to Hard to Kill, the pre-show of the event, the Impact Knockouts World Tag Team Champions The Death Dollz (Jessicka, Rosemary and Taya Valkyrie) will face Gisele Shaw, Savannah Evans and Tasha Steelz in a non-title six-Knockouts tag team match. Also on the pre-show, a six-way match was scheduled between Angels, Bhupinder Gujjar, Kushida, Mike Bailey, Mike Jackson, and Yuya Uemura.

On the December 22, 2022 episode of Impact!, top world title contenders Rich Swann and Steve Maclin faced off in a match that ended in a double countout. Despite this, as well as several referees and security guards attempting to separate the two men, both continued their respective assaults on one another. On the January 5, 2023 episode of Impact!, Swann challenged Maclin to a rematch, this time a Falls Count Anywhere match at Hard To Kill, which was made official later in the night.

== Event ==
Other on-screen personnel
Role:	Name:
Commentators	Tom Hannifan
Commentators	Matthew Rehwoldt
Commentators	Raven (Falls Count Anywhere match)
Ring announcer	David Penzer
Referees	Daniel Spencer
Referees	Allison Leigh
Referees	Frank Gastineau
Interviewer	Gia Miller

=== Countdown to Hard to Kill ===
There were three matches on the Countdown to Hard to Kill pre-show, with one taped as a digital exclusive.

The penultimate match saw Kushida, Alan Angels, Mike Jackson, Yuya Uemura and Mike Bailey square off in a X Division six-way bout. In the end, as Bailey was going to the top rope, Kenny King came from the back and pushed Bailey from the top rope. Kushida then cleared the apron with a handspring kick and locked in the Hoverboard Lock on Angels for the submission win.

The main event of the pre-show saw Trey Miguel defend the Impact X Division Championship against Black Taurus (with Crazzy Steve). In the end, Miguel hit the Lightning Spiral, but his feet were on the rope. Unbeknownst to the referee, Miguel then blinded Taurus with a spray paint, allowing him to hit another Lightning Spiral for the win.

=== Preliminary matches ===
The event started with a ten-bell salute to former Impact commentator Don West.

The opening contest was a Full Metal Mayhem match for the Impact World Championship between Josh Alexander and Bully Ray. In the closing stages, Alexander's wife, Jen, delivered a low blow to Ray, allowing Alexander to deliver a Sliced Bread, but Ray kicked out. Alexander then went to the top rope and connected with a splash through a table, for a two-count. Alexander immediately locked in the Ankle Lock for the submission victory.

Next, Frankie Kazarian made his return, announcing that he had left All Elite Wrestling (AEW) and had officially joined Impact Wrestling, putting the Impact roster on notice.

The next match saw The Motor City Machine Guns defend the Impact World Tag Team Championship against Bey and Austin, Heath and Rhino and The Major Players in a Four-way tag team elimination match. Heath and Rhino were eliminated after Matt Cardona rolled up Rhino. Bey then xeliverd the Art of Finesse and Austin hit The Fold on Brian Myers to eliminate The Major Players. The Motor City Machine Guns won after hitting The Dirt Bomb on Bey.

Next, Joe Hendry defended the Impact Digital Media Championship against Moose. Moose initially won after a low blow and a spear, but Santino Marella made his debut as the Director of Authority, and announced that the match will be restarted. Hendry then won after hitting the Standing Ovation.

Next, Masha Slamovich, Killer Kelly, Deonna Purrazzo and Taylor Wilde squared off to determine the #1 contender to the Impact Knockouts World Championship. In the closing stages, as Slamovich was trapped in the crossface submission by Wilde, Slamovich escaped and hit The Snowplow to become the #1 contender.

Next, Steve Maclin faced Rich Swann in a Falls Count Anywhere match. In the end, Maclin delivered a powerbomb, sent Swann into the guardrail and hit The KIA for the victory.

In the penultimate match, Eddie Edwards took on Jonathan Gresham. In the closing stages, Edwards connected with a Tiger Driver, but Gresham kicked out. Edwards then connected with the Boston Knee Party, for the win. After the match, PCO made his long awaited return and delivered a chokeslam to Edwards.

=== Main event ===
In the main event, Jordynne Grace defended the Impact Knockouts World Championship in a Title vs. Career match against Mickie James. Mickie hit a hurricana and the Mick Kick on Grace, for a two-count. As Grace was looking for the Grace Driver, Mickie countered in into an inside cradle for another two-count. Grace performed a sleeper hold submission on James, but James countered it into a knee lift. James sent Grace into the ring post, then performed a tornado DDT for the win, her career and the Impact Knockouts title. After the match, Mickie celebrated with her family and Tara as the show went off the air.

== Results ==
No.	Results	Stipulations	Times
1^{D}	Gisele Shaw, Savannah Evans and Tasha Steelz (with Jai Vidal) defeated The Death Dollz (Jessicka, Rosemary and Taya Valkyrie) by pinfall (Note: The match was taped for an Impact Digital Exclusive that aired on January 17.)	Six-Knockouts tag team match	8:39
2^{P}	Kushida defeated Angels, Delirious, Mike Bailey, Mike Jackson, and Yuya Uemura by submission	X Division Six-way match	7:25
3^{P}	Trey Miguel (c) defeated Black Taurus (with Crazzy Steve) by pinfall	Singles match for the Impact X Division Championship	10:10
4	Josh Alexander (c) defeated Bully Ray by submission	Full Metal Mayhem match for the Impact World Championship; This was Bully Ray's Call Your Shot championship match.	17:01
5	The Motor City Machine Guns (Alex Shelley and Chris Sabin) (c) defeated Heath and Rhino, Bullet Club (Ace Austin and Chris Bey), and The Major Players (Brian Myers and Matt Cardona)	Four-way tag team elimination match for the Impact World Tag Team Championship	13:13
6	Joe Hendry (c) defeated Moose by pinfall	Singles match for the Impact Digital Media Championship	14:05
7	Masha Slamovich defeated Deonna Purrazzo, Killer Kelly, and Taylor Wilde by pinfall	Four-way match to determine the #1 contender to the Impact Knockouts World Championship	9:20
8	Steve Maclin defeated Rich Swann by pinfall	Falls Count Anywhere match	11:41
9	Eddie Edwards defeated Jonathan Gresham by pinfall	Singles match	18:52
10	Mickie James defeated Jordynne Grace (c) by pinfall	Title vs. Career match for the Impact Knockouts World Championship	19:23
(c) / – the champion(s) heading into the match; D / – this was a dark match; P / – the match was broadcast on the pre-show

=== Impact World Tag Team Championship four-way tag team eliminations ===
Eliminated	Wrestler	Team	Eliminated by	Method of elimination	Time
1	Rhino	Heath and Rhino	Matt Cardona	Pinned with a roll-up	3:30
2	Brian Myers	The Major Players	Chris Bey	Pinned after The Fold	10:20
3	Chris Bey	Bullet Club	Chris Sabin	Pinned after The Dirt Bomb	13:13
Winners	The Motor City Machine Guns (c)		—		13:13
