= Hard To Kill (2024) =

TNA Wrestling pay-per-view event

- Promotional poster featuring Alex Shelley, Moose, Trinity, and Jordynne Grace
- Promotion: Total Nonstop Action Wrestling
- Date: January 13, 2024
- City: Paradise, Nevada
- Venue: Palms Casino Resort
- Buy rate: 60,000
- Tagline: “TNA Wrestling Is Back”

Pay-per-view chronology
← Previous; Final Resolution	Next → No Surrender

Hard To Kill chronology
← Previous; 2023	Next → Last

The 2024 Hard To Kill was a professional wrestling pay-per-view (PPV) event produced by Total Nonstop Action Wrestling (TNA). It took place on January 13, 2024, at the Palms Casino Resort in Paradise, Nevada. It was the fifth and final event under the Hard To Kill chronology, the first event promoted under the TNA name to broadcast live since Bound for Glory in 2016, the first TNA-branded PPV to take place since One Night Only: Rivals in 2017, the first and only Hard to Kill event promoted under the TNA name, and the first overall TNA-branded event to be held since the Total Nonstop Action Wrestling Special! in 2020.

Twelve matches took place at the event, including three on the Countdown to Hard To Kill pre-show. In the main event, Moose defeated Alex Shelley to win the TNA World Championship. In other prominent matches, Jordynne Grace defeated Trinity to win the TNA Knockouts World Championship, ABC (Chris Bey and Ace Austin) defeated The Rascalz (Trey Miguel and Zachary Wentz), Laredo Kid and Mike Bailey, and Grizzled Young Vets (James Drake and Zack Gibson) to retain the TNA World Tag Team Championship, Chris Sabin defeated Kushida and El Hijo del Vikingo to retain the TNA X Division Championship, Josh Alexander defeated Alex Hammerstone, and in the opening contest, Gisele Shaw defeated Alisha Edwards, Dani Luna, Jody Threat, Tasha Steelz, and Xia Brookside, in a Knockouts Ultimate X match to become #1 contender to the TNA Knockouts World Championship. The event was also notable for the TNA debuts of A. J. Francis, Ash by Elegance and Nic Nemeth. It was also the final event to feature Scott D'Amore as president, as he would be fired on February 8, 2024.

== Production ==
=== Background ===
On October 21, 2023, at Bound for Glory, Impact Wrestling announced that the 2024 Hard To Kill would take place on January 13, 2024, at Palms Casino Resort in Paradise, Nevada. At the same time, Impact announced that it would revert to its former Total Nonstop Action (TNA) Wrestling name beginning with the same event. Originally founded as NWA: Total Nonstop Action in 2002, and affiliated with the National Wrestling Alliance (NWA), the NWA branding would eventually be dropped, and the promotion would be known as TNA Wrestling from 2004 to 2017.

=== Storylines ===
The event featured several professional wrestling matches, with results predetermined by TNA. Storylines are produced on the company's weekly program, Impact!.

At Bound for Glory, Jordynne Grace won the Call Your Shot Gauntlet to earn the right to challenge for any title of her choice. After the match, Grace stated that she will challenge for the TNA Knockouts World Championship at Hard to Kill. Later in the night, Trinity successfully defended the Knockouts World Championship against Mickie James, setting her up to face Grace at Hard To Kill.

On Week 1 of Impact! 1000, Moose competed in Feast or Fired and won Briefcase 2, earning himself an TNA World Championship opportunity. Backstage at Bound for Glory, Gia Miller interviewed Moose after his Monster's Ball match, where he then stated that he would cash-in his Feast or Fired contract and challenge for the TNA World Championship at Hard to Kill. In the show's main event, Alex Shelley retained the world title over Josh Alexander, setting him up to face Moose at Hard To Kill.

On December 14, TNA announced that AAA Mega Champion El Hijo del Vikingo would appear at Hard To Kill The following day, it was announced that he and new signee Kushida will challenge Chris Sabin for the TNA X Division Championship in a three-way match.

On December 20, TNA announced the return of the Knockouts Ultimate X match, where the winner will receive a future TNA Knockouts World Championship match. On January 1, TNA announced Gisele Shaw as the first participant in the match. Former WWE wrestler Xia Brookside was announced as the next participant, making her TNA debut Jody Threat was announced as the third participant. Tasha Steelz, the winner of the inaugural Knockouts Ultimate X match, was announced as the fourth participant. Alisha Edwards would be declared the fifth participant. The final participant would be announced as Subculture member Dani Luna

On Week 1 of Impact! 1000, Crazzy Steve secured Briefcase 1 in Feast or Fired, giving him a TNA Digital Media Championship match. Steve had become even more maniacal and dark at this point after a revealing three-part interview that ended in chaos, leading him to turn his back on Decay partner Black Taurus and Digital Media Champion Tommy Dreamer. On the October 5 episode of Impact!, Dreamer attempted to talk sense into Steve by reminding him of their shared history when the latter first arrived in TNA. The two would share a hug, but Steve ultimately stabbed Dreamer in the back with a fork. The two would have their title match a month later on Impact!, which ended in disqualification when Dreamer stabbed Steve in the face with the same fork. TNA announced on December 22 that a rematch would be set for the Countdown to Hard To Kill pre-show in a no disqualification match.

On December 18, TNA began advertising surprise appearances by free agents for Hard To Kill. Eight days later on TNA's social media accounts, it was revealed that former WWE tag team Grizzled Young Veterans (Zack Gibson and James Drake) would make their TNA debuts at the event. They were later announced as challenging for the TNA World Tag Team Championship, along with The Rascalz (Zachary Wentz and Trey Miguel) and Speedball Mountain (Mike Bailey and Trent Seven), against champions ABC (Chris Bey and Ace Austin). However, on the day of Hard To Kill, TNA announced that Seven wouldn't be able to appear due to travel issues, with Laredo Kid becoming Bailey's partner in his place.

On January 2, former Major League Wrestling star Alex Hammerstone, who recently became a free agent, issued an open challenge on social media to any wrestler who can push him to his limits. The following day, Josh Alexander put his own challenge out to Hammerstone for a match at Hard To Kill, which TNA would later make official.

On January 8, it was announced that former WWE wrestler A. J. Francis, formerly known as Top Dolla, will appear at Hard To Kill alongside DJ Whoo Kid to premiere the music video to their new song "We Out$ide."

== Event ==
Other on-screen personnel
Role:	Name:
Commentators	Tom Hannifan
Commentators	Matthew Rehwoldt
Ring announcer	Jennifer Chung
Referees	Daniel Spencer
Referees	Allison Leigh
Referees	Frank Gastineau
Interviewer	Gia Miller

=== Pre-show ===
There were three matches which took place on the pre-show. In the opener, Rich Swann faced Steve Maclin. In the closing stages, Swann performed a running hurricarana to Maclin. Maclin then performed a diving headbutt on Swann and locked in a Boston Crab, but Swann reached the ropes. Swann then hit a clothesline and attempted the deliver a Phoenix Splash to Maclin, but Maclin moved out of the way and delivered a spear and the KIA for the win.

DJ Whoo Kid then came out to introduce AJ Francis. Francis then started rapping, until Joe Hendry came out and said that he made a music video about Francis. After the video ended, Whoo Kid hit Hendry with his laptop and Francis chokeslammed Hendry.

Next, The System (Eddie Edwards and Brian Myers) faced Eric Young and Frankie Kazarian. In the closing stages, Edwards delivered a lariat to Kazarian, but Kazarian then hit a hurricarana to him. Edwards attempted a backpack stunner to Young, but Young escaped an delivered a diving to both Myers and Edwards. Kazarian then delivered a slingshot cutter to Edwards. Edwards and Myers performed a backpack stunner/diving elbow combination on Kazarian for a two-count. Kazarian and Young then delivered an Unprettier/diving elbow combination on Myers for a two-count. Myers then delivered the Roster Cut and Edwards hit the Boston Knee Party on Kazarian to win the match.

The pre-show main event was a No Disqualification match for the TNA Digital Media Championship contested between defending champion Tommy Dreamer and Crazzy Steve. In the opening stages, Dreamer delivered a suplex to Steve on the outside. Steve then hit Dreamer two times with a chair. Dreamer then delivered a running crossbody to Steve onto a chair for a two-count. Dreamer then delivered the Bionic Elbow to Steve. Steve then wrapped a chair around Dreamer's head and performed a cutter to him. Dreamer then delivered a cutter and a suplex with a kendo stick for a two-count. Steve then taped Dreamer's hands together and put forks on his body. Steve then delivered a cannonball and then hit Belladonna's Kiss on Dreamer to win the title.

=== Preliminary matches ===
The opening contest was a Knockouts Ultimate X match contested between Gisele Shaw, Tasha Steelz, Xia Brookside, Alisha Edwards, Jody Threat and Dani Luna. In the opening stages, Threat delivered a lariat to Shaw and a german suplex to Alisha. Luna then delivered a fallaway slam and an exploder suplex to both Threat and Shaw. Brookside then delivered a diving crossbody to Shaw and Luna. Steelz then delivered a cutter to Threat onto Luna and Shaw on the outside. Luna then hit a powerbomb on Shaw, allowing Brookside to attempt to grab the X. Luna stopped her and powerbombed her. Luna then attempted to powerbomb Alisha, but Alisha countered it into a DDT. Threat then attempted to grab the X, but Shaw impeded her with a spear. Luna, Shaw and Steelz then climbed the rope and attempted to grab the X, but Steelz and Luna fell down, allowing Shaw to grab the X and become the #1 contender to the TNA Knockouts World Championship.

Next, PCO faced Dirty Dango (accompanied by Oleg Prudius and Alpha Bravo). In the closing stages, PCO delivered a cannonball in the corner to Dango and attempted to deliver the PCOSault, but Bravo pushed him down, causing a disqualification victory for PCO. Dango, Prudius and Bravo then started attacking PCO, but Rhino and Jake Something came down to the ring to prevent the beatdown. Director of Authority Santino Marella then made a six-man tag team match between Dango, Prudius and Bravo against Rhino, Something and PCO.

In the closing stages of the six-man tag team match, PCO delivered a PCOSault to Dango, Prudius and Bravo on the outside. Rhino then attempted a Gore on Dango, but Prudius impeded him with a clothesline. PCO then delivered a guillotine leg drop to Bravo. Something then performed a Vader Press on Dango. Rhino then delivered the Gore to Bravo and Something powerbombed Dango onto Bravo. PCO then delivered the PCOSault on Bravo and pinned him to win the match.

The next match was for the TNA Knockouts World Tag Team Championship between defending champions MK Ultra (Killer Kelly and Masha Slamovich) against the returning Decay (Havok and Rosemary). In the closing stages, Slamovich delivered a diving double foot stomp and a PK to Rosemary for a two-count. Kelly then hit another PK and a suplex to Rosemary. Havok then delivered simultaneous suplexes to Slamovich and Kelly. Slamovich then delivered the Snow Plough on Havok for a one-count. Havok then delivered a double chokeslam to Slamovich and Kelly, allowing Decay to deliver an assisted chokebomb on Kelly to win the titles for a third time as a tag team.

In the next match, Chris Sabin defended the TNA X Division Championship against Kushida and El Hijo del Vikingo. In the opening stages, Kushida delivered a tope atomico to both Vikingo and Sabin and attempted to lock in the Hoverboard Lock on Vikingo, but Vikingo escaped. Vikingo then delivered a superkick and springboard hurricarana to Sabin. Vikingo then delivered a spinning kick and a diving hurricarana to Kushida on the outside. Sabin then performed german suplexes to both Kushida and Vikingo. Sabin locked in an STF on Vikingo, but Kushida used a cartwheel dropkick to break up the submission. Kushida performed a monkey flip to Vikingo, who used the leverage to deliver a hurricarana to Sabin. Vikingo delivered a moonsault press to both Sabin and Kushida on the outside. Vikingo hit a missile dropkick on Sabin, Kushida delivered a seated senton to Vikingo and Sabin delivered a crossbody to Kushida. Vikingo delivered a 450° splash to Sabin on the ramp. Sabin then delivered a Canadian Destroyer to Vikingo, a german suplex from the top rope and then Cradle Shock to Kushida to retain the title.

Next, Josh Alexander faced Alex Hammerstone. In the opening stages, Hammerstone delivered a tope atomico to Alexander on the outside. Hammerstone then delivered a belly-to-belly suplex to Alexander. Alexander then delivered a powerslam to Hammerstone on the apron. Alexander then delivered a diving knee drop to Hammerstone's head for a two-count. Hammerstone attempted a pump kick, but Alexander reversed it into an ankle lock, but Hammerstone escaped. Alexander attempted the C4 Spike, but Hammerstone reversed it and hit the Nightmare Pendulum, but his tweaked knee prevented him from making the cover. Hammerstone then delivered an apron Death Valley Driver, a missile dropkick and a fireman's carry cutter for a nearfall. Hammerstone the delivered a powerbomb, but Alexander then performed a German suplex and the C4 Spike to win.

In the next match, ABC (Chris Bey and Ace Austin) defended the TNA World Tag Team Championship against The Rascalz (Trey Miguel and Zachary Wentz), Mike Bailey and Laredo Kid, and Grizzled Young Vets (James Drake and Zack Gibson). In the opening stages, The Rascalz delivered Hot Fire Flame to Bey. Wentz delivered a German suplex to Drake and Bailey delivered a missile dropkick to Wentz. Laredo Kid then delivered a tirt-a-whirl DDT to Drake and a Michinoku Driver to Wentz for a two-count. Grizzled Young Vets then delivered a Doomsday Device to Wentz, but Bailey broke up the pin. Laredo Kid delivered a missile dropkick to Grizzled Young Vets and Bailey performed a triangle moonsault onto ABC on the outside. Bailey then delivered a tight-rope poison rana to Drake and then the Ultima Weapon, but the Rascalz broke up the pin. Miguel delivered a superkick to Laredo Kid and Wentz performed a UFO Cutter on Bailey. As The Rascalz attempted a handspring cutter, ABC impeded them with dropkicks and then hit the Art of Finesse/The Fold combination (1-2-Sweet!) on Miguel and pinned him to retain his title.

In the penultimate match, Trinity defended the TNA Knockouts World Championship against Jordynne Grace. In the opening stages, Trinity attempted a Tiger Feint Kick, but Grace caught her and delivered a back suplex for a two-count. Trinity then performed a crossbody and a seated headscissors for a two-count. Grace then delivered a powerbomb and a knee lift to Trinity. Grace then delivered a clothesline, a tope suicida and a jackhammer to Trinity on the outside. Grace attempted another powerbomb, but Trinity escaped it with a back body drop. Trinity then delivered an enzeguiri and a split-legged moonsault to Grace for a nearfall. Trinity attempted a Full Nelson Bomb, but Grace reversed into a Full Nelson, but Trinity reached the ropes. Grace then delivered Muscle Buster to Trinity for a nearfall. Trinity then locked in Starstruck, but Grace escaped and delivered the Rear View for a two-count. Trinity then delivered a Heatseeker to Grace for another nearfall. Trinity then locked in Starstruck again, but Grace transitioned it into a deadlift german suplex and then delivered the Juggernaut Driver and pinned Trinity to win the match. After the match, Grace embraced Trinity.

=== Main event ===
In the main event, Alex Shelley defended the TNA World Championship against Moose. In the opening stages, Moose delivered a uranage to Shelley for a two-count. Moose then delivered a pump kick and attempted to powerbomb Shelley, but Shelley reversed it into a DDT. Shelley then delivered a shotgun dropkick and a baseball slide to Moose. Shelley attempted Sliced Bread #2, but Moose caught him and pushed him into the ring post. Shelley then delivered Shell Shock to Moose on the outside and then pushed him into the ring for a two-count. Shelley then delivered a flatliner and locked in the Border City Stretch, but Moose escaped and then powerbombed Shelley for a two-count. Moose attempted a spear, but Shelley move out of the way and Moose hit his injured arm. Shelley then delivered two lariats and attempted a third, but Moose caught him and attempted a uranage. Shelley transitioned and delivered Sliced Bread #2 for a two-count. Myers and Edwards then came down to assist Moose, but Kushida and Sabin came down to prevent them. The returning DeAngelo Williams distracted Shelley, allowing Moose to land a forearm. Shelley then delivered a superkick to Moose and attempted Shell Shock, but Moose countered it and delivered the spear to win the title. After the match, The System (Moose, Eddie Edwards, Alisha Edwards, Myers and DeAngelo Williams) celebrated Moose's win, until the debuting Nic Nemeth came from the crowd and stared down Moose. Nemeth then delivered a superkick and the Danger Zone to Moose. Nemeth then revealed that he was wearing a TNA shirt as the event went off the air.

== Reception ==
Erik Beaston of Bleacher Report graded the show an A, saying that "Nic Nemeth's debut was the exclamation point on a show that was damn good even without the massive moment. The second half of Hard to Kill was one of the best wrestling shows in recent memory, with the X-Division, tag team, Knockouts, and world title matches all delivering in a big way. The company promised a noteworthy night and delivered, but more important than all of it was the renewed energy around the product. The TNA rebrand has brought eyes to the show and, hopefully, will result in renewed interest for one of the business' best kept secrets".

Dave Meltzer of the Wrestling Observer Newsletter rated the Maclin-Swann bout 3.25 stars, The System vs. Kazarian and Young, and the Knockouts Ultimate X match 3 stars; the six-man tag team match 1 star (the lowest rated match on the card), the Knockouts tag team title match 1.25 stars, the X Division Championship match and the TNA World Tag Title match 4.25 stars (the highest rated matches on the card), the Hammerstone-Alexander match 3.75 stars, the Knockouts title match 2.75 stars and the World Championship match 3.75 stars.

== Results ==
No.	Results	Stipulations	Times
1^{P}	Steve Maclin defeated Rich Swann by pinfall	Singles match	10:22
2^{P}	The System (Eddie Edwards and Brian Myers) defeated Frankie Kazarian and Eric Young by pinfall	Tag team match	8:06
3^{P}	Crazzy Steve defeated Tommy Dreamer (c) by pinfall	No Disqualification match for the TNA Digital Media Championship	11:09
4	Gisele Shaw defeated Alisha Edwards, Dani Luna, Jody Threat, Tasha Steelz, and Xia Brookside	Knockouts Ultimate X match to determine the #1 contender for the TNA Knockouts World Championship	12:00
5	PCO defeated Dirty Dango (with Alpha Bravo and Oleg Prudius) by disqualification	Singles match	1:15
6	Rhino, Jake Something and PCO defeated Alpha Bravo, Oleg Prudius and Dirty Dango by pinfall	Six-man tag team match	7:20
7	Decay (Havok and Rosemary) defeated MK Ultra (Killer Kelly and Masha Slamovich) (c) by pinfall	Tag team match for the TNA Knockouts World Tag Team Championship	6:15
8	Chris Sabin (c) defeated El Hijo del Vikingo and Kushida by pinfall	Three-way match for the TNA X Division Championship	12:00
9	Josh Alexander defeated Alex Hammerstone by pinfall	Singles match	15:00
10	ABC (Ace Austin and Chris Bey) (c) defeated The Rascalz (Trey Miguel and Zachary Wentz), Laredo Kid and Mike Bailey, and Grizzled Young Vets (James Drake and Zack Gibson) by pinfall	Four-way tag team match for the TNA World Tag Team Championship	14:15
11	Jordynne Grace defeated Trinity (c) by pinfall	Singles match for the TNA Knockouts World Championship; This was Grace's Call Your Shot championship match.	14:30
12	Moose defeated Alex Shelley (c) by pinfall	Singles match for the TNA World Championship; This was Moose's Feast or Fired World Title match	21:45
(c) / – the champion(s) heading into the match; P / – the match was broadcast on the pre-show
