= TNA Hard To Kill =

Hard To Kill
- TNA Hard To Kill logo used as of 2024
- Promotion: Total Nonstop Action Wrestling
- First event: 2020
- Last event: 2024

Hard To Kill was a professional wrestling premium live event produced by Total Nonstop Action Wrestling that was annually held during the month of January. The event was first held in 2020 and had since become one of the promotion's "Big Four" events (along with Rebellion, Slammiversary, and Bound for Glory).

== History ==
The inaugural Hard To Kill event took place on January 12, 2020, at The Bomb Factory in Dallas, Texas, where Tessa Blanchard became the first Knockout to win the Impact World Championship by defeating the reigning champion, Sami Callihan, in the main event. Since of April of that year, due to the COVID-19 pandemic in the United States, Impact had to present the majority of its programming from a behind closed doors set at Skyway Studios in Nashville, Tennessee. The second Hard To Kill event, which took part on January 16, 2021, at the Skyway Studios, saw the revival of the Impact Knockouts Tag Team Championship, where Fire 'N Flava (Kiera Hogan and Tasha Steelz) won the titles by defeating Havok and Nevaeh in the finals of an eight-team tournament, being the first champions since 2013.

The third Hard To Kill event, which took place on January 8, 2022, at The Factory in Deep Ellum in Dallas, Texas, saw the return of live attendance. The fifth and final event took place on January 13, 2024, and was the first premium live event under the rebranded and revived Total Nonstop Action (TNA) Wrestling banner.

== Events ==
#	Event	Date	City	Venue	Main event	Ref.
1	Hard To Kill (2020)	January 12, 2020	Dallas, Texas	The Bomb Factory	Sami Callihan (c) vs. Tessa Blanchard in an intergender match for the Impact World Championship	
2	Hard To Kill (2021)	January 16, 2021	Nashville, Tennessee	Skyway Studios	Chris Sabin, Moose and Rich Swann vs. The Good Brothers (Doc Gallows and Karl Anderson) and Kenny Omega	
3	Hard To Kill (2022)	January 8, 2022	Dallas, Texas	The Factory in Deep Ellum	Mickie James (c) vs. Deonna Purrazzo in a Texas Deathmatch for the Impact Knockouts Championship	
4	Hard To Kill (2023)	January 13, 2023	Atlanta, Georgia	Center Stage	Jordynne Grace (c) vs. Mickie James in a Title vs. Career match for the Impact Knockouts World Championship	
5	Hard To Kill (2024)	January 13, 2024	Paradise, Nevada	Palms Casino Resort	Alex Shelley (c) vs. Moose for the TNA World Championship	
(c) – refers to the champion(s) heading into the match
