= TNA: There's No Place Like Home =

Wrestling pay-per-view event produced by Impact Wrestling

- Promotional poster featuring Shark Boy
- Promotion: Impact Wrestling
- Date: April 3, 2020 (cancelled)
- City: Tampa, Florida
- Venue: The Ritz Ybor
- Tagline: "There's No Place Like Home"

Pay-per-view chronology
← Previous; Hard To Kill	Next → Slammiversary

TNA: There's No Place Like Home was a scheduled professional wrestling pay-per-view event produced by Impact Wrestling. It was planned to take place during the WrestleCon convention on April 3, 2020 at The Ritz Ybor in Tampa, Florida and stream live on FITE TV. The event was cancelled in response to the COVID-19 pandemic.

== Event concept ==
The concept of this event is a throwback show to Impact Wrestling's previous years as NWA: Total Nonstop Action (NWA-TNA), from 2002 to 2004, and Total Nonstop Action Wrestling (TNA), from 2004 to 2017. The event's logo is based on the promotion's original NWA-TNA logo.

D'Lo Brown and Mr. Anderson were scheduled to represent the Aces & Eights at this event. Chris Harris and eight time X Division champion Chris Sabin were both scheduled to make an appearance. TNA legend Shark Boy also featured on the promotional material for this event.

== Announced matches at the time of cancellation ==
No.	Matches*	Stipulations
1	Participants Unknown	Ultimate X match
2	Participants Unknown	King of the Mountain match
*Card subject to change
