= Total Nonstop Action Wrestling Special! =

Professional wrestling television special

- Promotion: Impact Wrestling
- Date: March 6, 2020 (aired March 31, 2020)
- City: Cumberland, Georgia
- Venue: Coca-Cola Roxy

Impact! special episodes chronology
← Previous; Against All Odds	Next → Rebellion

Total Nonstop Action Wrestling Special! was a special episode of Impact! produced by professional wrestling promotion Impact Wrestling. The special was taped on March 6, 2020 at the Coca-Cola Roxy in Cumberland, Georgia and aired on AXS TV on March 31, 2020.

== Background ==
The special was originally a set up leading to the TNA: There's No Place Like Home PPV event, but the event was ultimately cancelled in response to the COVID-19 pandemic.

== Results ==
No.	Results	Stipulations	Times
1	Hernandez defeated Chase Stevens	Singles match	2:06
2	Manik and Suicide defeated Johnny Swinger and Kid Kash	Tag Team match	6:00
3	Rhino defeated Madman Fulton by DQ	Singles match	3:52
