= Bound for Glory (2019) =

2019 Impact Wrestling pay-per-view event

- Promotional poster featuring various Impact wrestlers
- Promotion: Impact Wrestling
- Date: October 20, 2019
- City: Villa Park, Illinois
- Venue: Odeum Expo Center
- Attendance: 3,200

Pay-per-view chronology
← Previous; Lucha Invades NY	Next → Hard To Kill

Bound for Glory chronology
← Previous; 2018	Next → 2020

The 2019 Bound for Glory was a professional wrestling pay-per-view (PPV) event produced by Impact Wrestling. It took place on October 20, 2019, in Villa Park, Illinois. It was the 15th event under the Bound for Glory chronology. Wrestlers from Mexico's Lucha Libre AAA Worldwide (AAA) and Japan's Pro Wrestling Noah (NOAH), with which Impact Wrestling has partnerships, also appeared on the card.

== Production ==
Other on-screen personnel
Commentators	Josh Mathews
Commentators	Don Callis
Ring announcer	Jeffery Scott
Referees	Brandon Tolle
Referees	John E. Bravo
Referees	Kris Levin
Referees	Harry Demerjian
Interviewer	Alicia Atout

=== Background ===
At Slammiversary XVII, Impact Wrestling announced the date for Bound for Glory, with the Odeum Expo Center later announced as the event's venue.

=== Storylines ===
The event featured professional wrestling matches that involved different wrestlers from pre-existing scripted feuds and storylines. Wrestlers portrayed villains, heroes, or less distinguishable characters in scripted events that built tension and culminated in a wrestling match or series of matches.

== Reception ==
Bound for Glory received mixed reviews. Nolan Howell of Canoe.ca declared that "There were some moments to be happy about on this show. The ladder match, the main event, and Elgin vs. Marufuji delivered. They left themselves a lot of room to book between Callihan & oVe, Cage, Blanchard, and potential to build other winners like Ace Austin".

Larry Csonka from 411mania further stated that "Impact Bound for Glory 2019 was a good but uneven show with a slow start but later developed into a really fun show. I think they may have missed an opportunity but not having Sami and Tessa win big here, as Sami is their best heel by a mile, while Tessa is the biggest star they have right now. If you're cherry picking, check out the ladder match, Elgin vs. Marufuji, and Sami vs Cage."

Jason Powell from Pro Wrestling Dot Net commented on the main event as being a "solid main event that lacked drama. Both guys worked hard and put their bodies on the line, but they never sold me on Callihan’s near falls for some reason. The overall show featured strong effort and some insane moments. Here’s hoping that the company moving into its run on AXS TV means next year’s BFG will feel bigger".

== Results ==
No.	Results	Stipulations	Times
1^{D}	Madison Rayne defeated Shotzi Blackheart	Singles match	6:05
2^{D}	The Rascalz (Dezmond Xavier, Trey Miguel and Zachary Wentz) defeated Aero Star, Black Taurus and Dr. Wagner Jr.	Six-man tag team match	6:45
3	Eddie Edwards won by last eliminating Mahabali Shera (Note: The other participants were: Adam Thornstowe, Cody Deaner, Cousin Jake, Fallah Bahh, Havok, Joey Ryan, Johnny Swinger, Jordynne Grace, Kiera Hogan, Kylie Rae, Luster the Legend, Madman Fulton, Raj Singh, Rohit Raju, Rosemary, Sabu, Swoggle and Tommy Dreamer)	Call Your Shot Gauntlet match where the winner could choose any championship match of their choice	29:30
4	Taya Valkyrie (c) (with John E. Bravo) defeated Tenille Dashwood	Singles match for the Impact Knockouts Championship	11:50
5	The North (Ethan Page and Josh Alexander) (c) defeated Rich Swann and Willie Mack and Rhino and Rob Van Dam	Three-Way match for the Impact World Tag Team Championship	14:20
6	Michael Elgin defeated Naomichi Marufuji	Singles match	18:05
7	Ace Austin defeated Jake Crist (c), Acey Romero, Daga and Tessa Blanchard	Ladder match for the Impact X Division Championship	17:40
8	Moose defeated Ken Shamrock	Singles match	10:35
9	Brian Cage (c) defeated Sami Callihan	No Disqualification match for the Impact World Championship	16:50
(c) / – the champion(s) heading into the match; D / – this was a dark match

=== Call Your Shot Gauntlet entrances and eliminations ===
– Winner

Draw	Entrant	Order	Eliminated by	Time	Eliminations
1	Eddie Edwards	—	Winner	29:30	3
2	Adam Thornstowe	5	Madman Fulton	12:16	0
3	Luster the Legend	10	Eddie Edwards	17:15	0
4	Cousin Jake	2	Joey Ryan	05:09	0
5	Rohit Raju	1	Joey Ryan	03:44	0
6	Joey Ryan	6	Madman Fulton	06:14	2
7	Jessicka Havok	4	Madman Fulton	03:00	0
8	Rosemary	3	Madman Fulton	01:45	0
9	Madman Fulton	18	Eddie Edwards	16:19	7
10	Cody Deaner	7	Madman Fulton	00:51	0
11	Johnny Swinger	8	Jordynne Grace	00:24	0
12	Jordynne Grace	15	Mahabali Shera	10:02	2
13	Swoggle	13	Madman Fulton	07:11	0
14	Kiera Hogan	9	Jordynne Grace	00:39	0
15	Raj Singh	11	Tommy Dreamer	03:04	0
16	Tommy Dreamer	12	Madman Fulton	02:21	1
17	Kylie Rae	14	Mahabali Shera	04:06	0
18	Fallah Bahh	17	Mahabali Shera	03:57	0
19	Sabu	16	Mahabali Shera	02:01	0
20	Mahabali Shera	19	Eddie Edwards	04:22	4

== See also ==
- 2019 in professional wrestling
