= Hard To Kill (2020) =

2020 Impact Wrestling pay-per-view event

Hard to Kill (2020)
- Promotional poster featuring oVe (Madman Fulton, Sami Callihan, Dave Crist and Jake Crist) and Tessa Blanchard
- Promotion: Impact Wrestling
- Date: January 12, 2020
- City: Dallas, Texas
- Venue: The Bomb Factory

Pay-per-view chronology
| ← Previous; Bound for Glory | Next → TNA: There's No Place Like Home (cancelled) |

Hard to Kill chronology
| ← Previous; First | Next → 2021 |

The 2020 Hard To Kill was a professional wrestling pay-per-view (PPV) event produced by Impact Wrestling. It took place on January 12, 2020, in Dallas, Texas. It was the inaugural event under the Hard To Kill chronology.

Nine matches were contested at the event. In the main event, Tessa Blanchard defeated Sami Callihan in an intergender match to win the Impact World Championship, becoming the first female world champion in Impact history.

== Production ==
Other on-screen personnel
| Commentators | Josh Mathews |
| Commentators | Don Callis |
| Ring announcer | Jeffery Scott |
| Referees | Brandon Tolle |
| Referees | Kris Levin |
| Referees | Harry Demerjian |
| Interviewer | Gabby Loren |

=== Background ===
At Bound for Glory, Impact Wrestling announced Hard To Kill would take place in January 2020, however no specific date or location was announced. It was later announced to take place on January 12, 2020, in Dallas, Texas.

=== Storylines ===
The event featured professional wrestling matches that involved different wrestlers from pre-existing scripted feuds and storylines. Wrestlers portrayed villains, heroes, or less distinguishable characters in scripted events that built tension and culminated in a wrestling match or series of matches.

In mid-2019, Sami Callihan and his stable Ohio Versus Everything (oVe) began feuding with Tessa Blanchard, initially culminating with Callihan defeating Blanchard at Slammiversary XVII—the first intergender main event of a wrestling pay-per-view. After Callihan and Blanchard won the Mashup Tournament, Callihan defeated Blanchard at Bound for Glory to become the number-one contender for the Impact World Championship. After losing to the defending champion Brian Cage at Unbreakable, the pair fought two rematches: Cage retained the title in a steel cage match on the following episode of Impact Wrestling, but Callihan would defeat Cage at Turning Point to become the new champion. On the November 19, 2019 episode of Impact Wrestling, Blanchard defeated Cage as the final participant in a gauntlet match, becoming the number-one contender for the Impact World Championship.

Rich Swann was originally going to compete against the North with his partner Willie Mack, but he suffered an ankle injury two nights before at Bash at the Brewery 2. Doctors decided to not allow him to compete. Brian Cage also suffered a torn bicep in the weeks leading up to the show and was also unable to compete in an official match. Daga took his place to wrestle Rob Van Dam.

== Results ==
| No. | Results | Stipulations | Times |
|---|---|---|---|
| 1 | Ken Shamrock defeated Madman Fulton (with Dave Crist and Jake Crist) by submission | Singles match | 9:19 |
| 2 | Ace Austin (c) defeated Trey Miguel | Singles match for the Impact X Division Championship | 12:55 |
| 3 | Taya Valkyrie (c) (with John E. Bravo) defeated Jordynne Grace and ODB | Three-way match for the Impact Knockouts Championship | 11:37 |
| 4 | Brian Cage vs. Rob Van Dam (with Katie Forbes) ended in a no contest | Singles match | — |
| 5 | Rob Van Dam (with Katie Forbes) defeated Daga | Singles match | 4:11 |
| 6 | Eddie Edwards defeated Michael Elgin | Singles match for Edwards' Call Your Shot Trophy | 19:53 |
| 7 | Moose defeated Rhino | No Disqualification match | 13:00 |
| 8 | The North (Ethan Page and Josh Alexander) (c) defeated Willie Mack | Handicap match for the Impact World Tag Team Championship | 10:37 |
| 9 | Tessa Blanchard defeated Sami Callihan (c) | Singles match for the Impact World Championship | 23:49 |
(c) / – the champion(s) heading into the match

== See also ==
- 2020 in professional wrestling
