= The Ritz Ybor =

Events venue in Ybor City within Tampa, Florida

Coordinates: 27.96016°N 82.44276°W

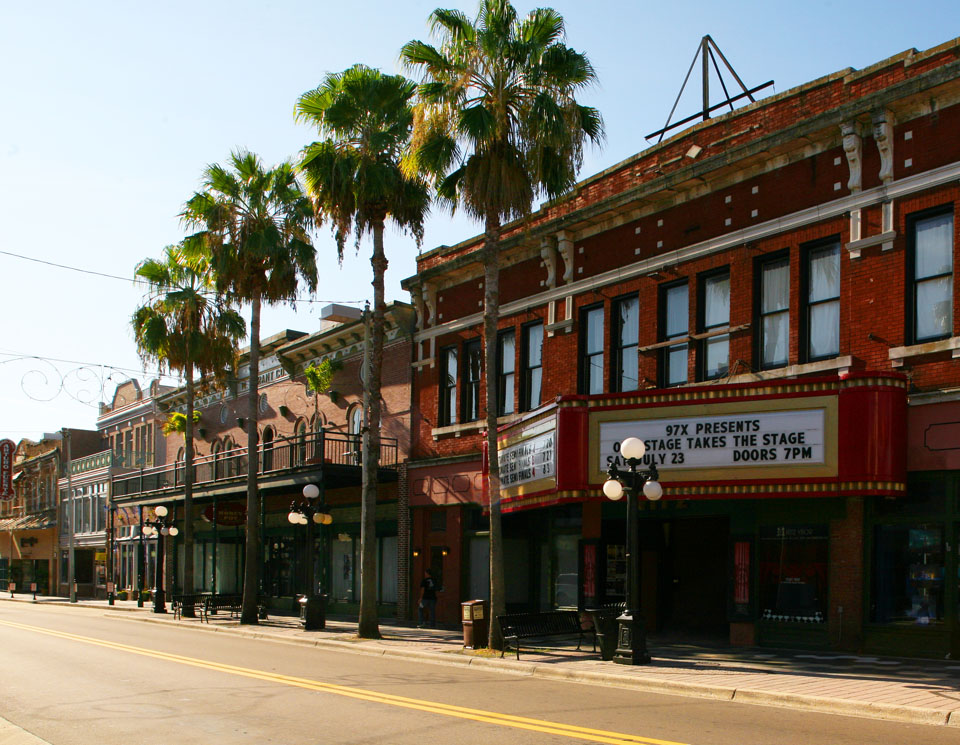
- Exterior view of venue (c.2010)
- Interactive map of The Ritz Ybor
- Former names: Rivoli Theatre (1917–1931); Ritz Theatre (1931–1987); Masquerade (1992–2006)
- Address: 1503 E 7th Ave; Tampa, FL 33605-3713
- Location: Ybor City Historic District
- Owner: Capitano and Garcia LLC
- Operator: Sunset Events
- Capacity: 1,114

Construction
- Opened: 1917
- Renovated: 1929; 1931; 1961; 1983; 2006–2008; 2013
- Architect: Bonfoey and Elliott

Website
- Venue Website
- Building details

General information
- Renovation cost: $2 million ($3.19 million in 2025 dollars)

Renovating team
- Architect: Alfonso Architects
- Main contractor: DPR Construction

The Ritz Ybor (originally the Rivoli Theatre) is an events venue located in the historic Ybor City, within Tampa, Florida. Opening in 1917, the theatre catered to the Afro-Cuban community in the emerging neighborhood. Throughout the years, the venue was served as a cinema, adult movie theater, nightclub and concert venue. The theatre was transformed into its current incarnation in 2008; becoming one of Tampa's premier live music and events venue.

== History ==
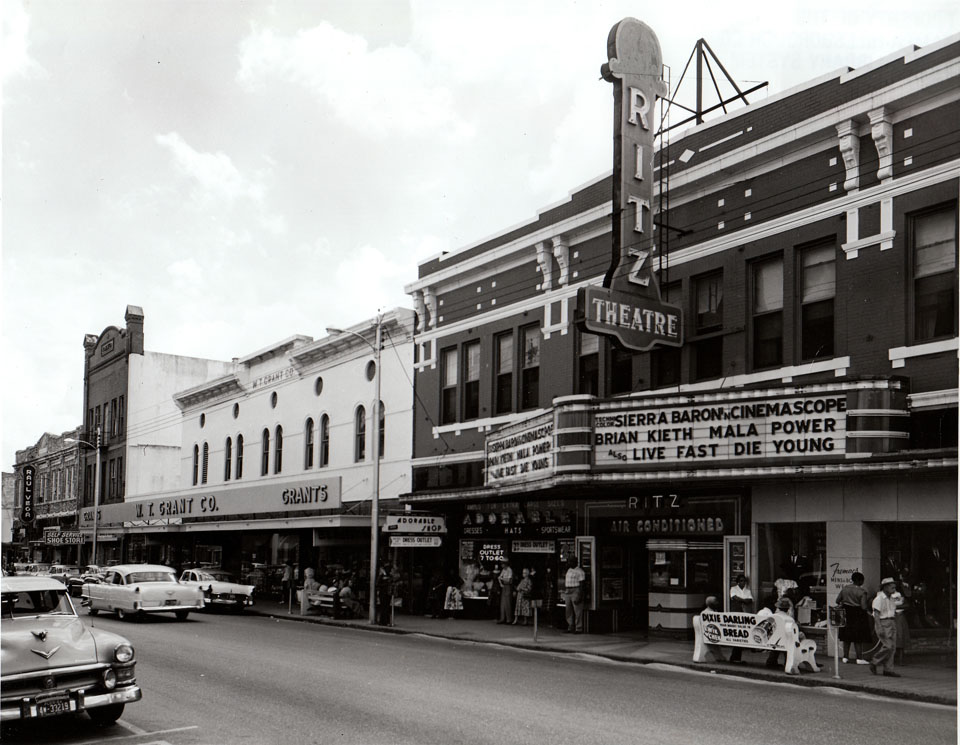
In 1958

In 1917, the building opened as the Rivoli Theatre, a red brick building with a silent movie theater on the first floor and various apartments on the second floor. It was the first theater of its kind in the United States. In 1931, the building underwent an expansion and reopened as The Ritz Theatre. It continued to show a variety of standard films until December 31, 1965, when it transitioned to nude shows and XXX-rated films.

In September 1983, developer William E. Field purchased the building and remodeled it once again. Field's ambitions never materialized, and a bank foreclosure in 1987 forced him to close his doors. That same year, the building was leased to The Masquerade nightclub. As Masquerade, the venue saw the performances of a variety of rising alternative acts. In 1988, the Capitano family purchased the building as an investment property. In 1973 and 1989, Ybor City was listed on the National Register of Historic Places and the National Historic Landmark District, respectively. This building was listed as a contribution in both entries. In 2006, the Masquerade tenants were evicted. The building underwent a $2 million renovation and on June 26, 2008, opened its doors as The Ritz Ybor, a special events and live music venue.

The building is located in the heart of historic Ybor City. The Ritz Ybor is a short trolley ride away from the Channelside district, two to three miles from downtown Tampa and a 15-minute car ride from Tampa International Airport. It is located within walking distance of the Centro Ybor Entertainment Complex and the Hillsborough Community College Ybor City campus.

== Venue ==
The venue counts with over 17,000 square feet (1,600 m^{2}), three distinct rooms, a grand foyer, full-service bars, a state-of-the-art lighting system and a caterers prep kitchen that allows for outside licensed and insured catering. The three rooms inside the venue are the Royal Room, the Rivoli Room and the Theatre Ballroom. The Theatre Ballroom has a 25-by-44-foot (7.6 m × 13.4 m) theatrical stage. The Grand Foyer, which connects all three rooms, houses the original terrazzo floors, Art Deco mirrors and wall sconces.

== Noted performers ==
- Tool
- Fugazi
- Widespread Panic
- A Boogie Wit Da Hoodie
- Phish
- Mos Def
- Palaye Royale
- Scene Queen
- Conan Gray
- Umi
- Starbenders
- Ice-T
- The Smashing Pumpkins
- The Killers
- Icona Pop
- Miguel
- Nirvana
- The Sugarcubes
- Jane's Addiction
- Foo Fighters
- Nine Inch Nails
- De La Soul
- Lady Gaga
- Tiësto
- Purity Ring
- Robyn
- Fleet Foxes
- Glass Animals
- Foster the People
- Kesha
- Melanie Martinez
- Dave Matthews Band
- Neon Trees
- Manchester Orchestra
- Dashboard Confessional
- NOFX
- Taking Back Sunday
- Yellowcard
- Tech N9ne
- AFI
- Gwar
- Twenty One Pilots
- Die Antwoord
- Dropkick Murphys
- Panic! at the Disco
- Type O Negative
- Franz Ferdinand
- KMFDM
- Brockhampton
- Rebecca Black
