= Total Nonstop Action Wrestling =

American professional wrestling promotion

Anthem Wrestling Exhibitions, LLC
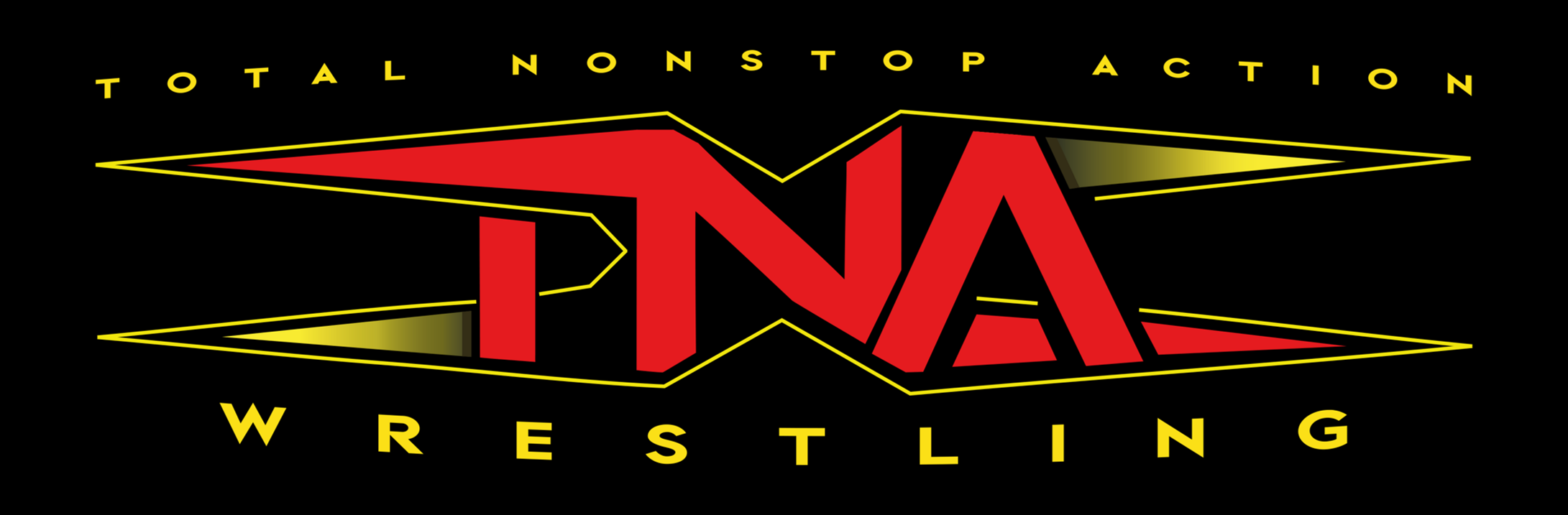
- Logo used since October 26, 2024
- Trade name: NWA: Total Nonstop Action (2002–2004); Total Nonstop Action Wrestling (2004–2017, 2024–present); Impact Wrestling (Mar.–Jun. 2017, Sep. 2017–2024); Global Force Wrestling (Jun.–Sep. 2017)
- Formerly: J Sports & Entertainment, LLC (2002); TNA Entertainment, LLC (2002–2016); Impact Ventures, LLC (2015–2016)
- Type: Subsidiary
- Industry: Professional wrestling; Streaming media
- Founded: May 10, 2002; 24 years ago in Nashville, Tennessee
- Founders: Jeff Jarrett; Jerry Jarrett; Bob Ryder
- Headquarters: Nashville, Tennessee, U.S.
- Area served: Worldwide
- Key people: Leonard Asper (Founder/president/CEO – Anthem Sports & Entertainment); Carlos Silva (President – TNA); Hunter "Delirious" Johnston (Head of Creative – TNA)
- Products: Home video; Merchandise; Music; Pay-per-view; Publishing; TV; Video on demand
- Parent: Anthem Sports & Entertainment
- Divisions: TNA+; TNA Home Video
- Website: tnawrestling.com

Total Nonstop Action Wrestling (TNA Wrestling or simply TNA) is an American professional wrestling promotion based in Nashville, Tennessee. It is a subsidiary of Anthem Sports & Entertainment.

TNA was founded in May 2002 by professional wrestlers Jeff and Jerry Jarrett, and was initially affiliated with the National Wrestling Alliance (NWA) and subtitled as NWA: Total Nonstop Action (NWA-TNA). TNA was acquired by Panda Energy that October, aired weekly pay-per-view (PPV) events in the United States until September 2004, and largely separated from the NWA soon after. TNA debuted its flagship weekly broadcast television show TNA Impact! in May 2004, gaining attention for its emphasis on fast-paced and acrobatic wrestling, female performers, and a sports-like presentation, including the use of a six-sided ring: TNA soon became the second-largest American wrestling promotion behind WWE.

TNA suffered financial mismanagement and infamous creative missteps between 2010 and 2016, prompting the exodus of several wrestlers and Panda Energy divesting its stake to Dixie Carter in 2012, with Carter eventually selling to Anthem in 2017. TNA was rebranded to Impact Wrestling in 2017 before returning to its original name in 2024. Anthem has since broadly stabilized TNA, with the promotion now considered as the third-largest wrestling promotion in the United States, behind WWE and All Elite Wrestling (AEW).

TNA's roster primarily appears on TNA Impact!, as well as on its streaming and PPV programming. TNA wrestlers have also appeared at events produced by other promotions, including WWE. As with other professional wrestling promotions, TNA promotes predetermined contests that are athletic and entertainment-based featuring storyline-driven, scripted, and partially choreographed matches. However, matches require considerable athletic skill and often include moves that can put performers at risk of serious injury or death if not performed correctly.

== History ==
=== Formation and early history (2002–2004) ===
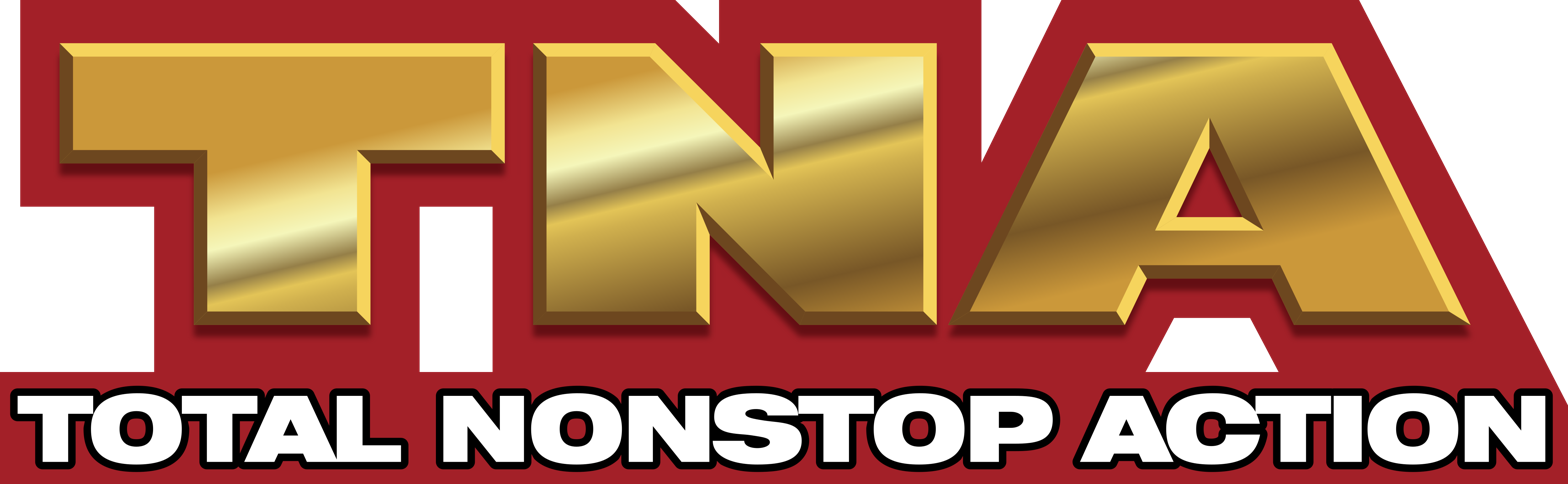
First logo used from 2002 to 2003. Used once in 2020 for the Total Nonstop Action Wrestling Special

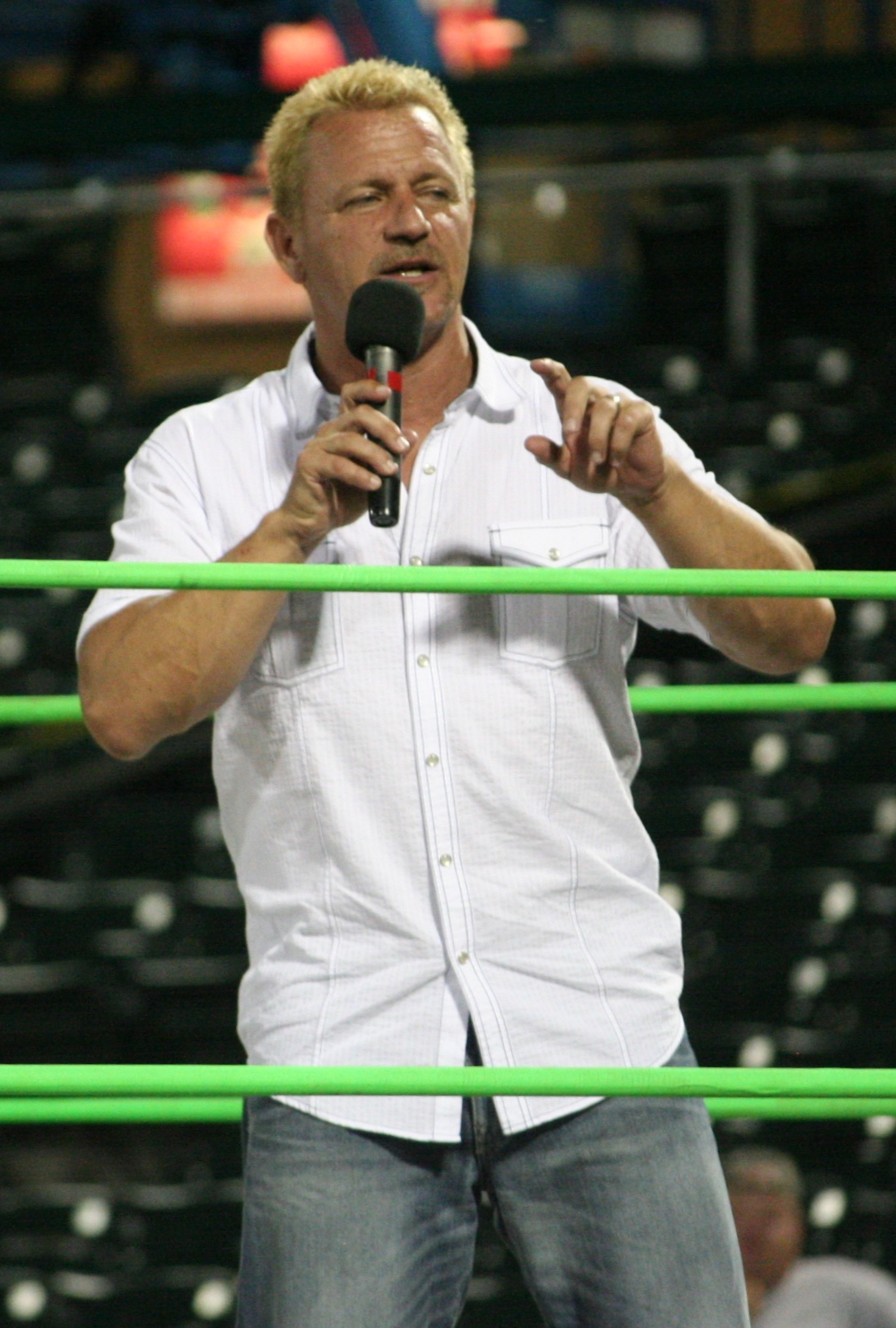
Jeff Jarrett, one of the founders of TNA, Hall of Famer and six-time NWA World Heavyweight Champion

The concept of TNA originated shortly after World Championship Wrestling (WCW) ended in 2001, with the World Wrestling Federation (WWF, later WWE) gaining a monopoly on the industry. While on a fishing trip, Bob Ryder, Jeff Jarrett and Jerry Jarrett contemplated their futures in the professional wrestling business under a parent company known as J Sports & Entertainment, LLC. Ryder suggested a company not reliant on television, but rather one going straight to pay-per-view. In July 2002, Vince Russo joined Jeff and Jerry Jarrett's NWA-TNA promotion as a creative writer and would assist in the writing and production of the shows. Russo states that he coined the name "Total Nonstop Action", the initials of the company "TNA" being a play on "T&A". The original intention, as they were exclusive to pay-per-view, was to be viewed as an edgier product than WWE.

Initially, TNA's weekly pay-per-view show operated as the company's main source of revenue, in place of monthly pay-per-view events used by other promotions. These shows took place mostly at the Tennessee State Fairground Sports Arena in Nashville, nicknamed the "TNA Asylum". In October 2002, Panda Energy International purchased a controlling interest (72%) of Total Nonstop Action Wrestling from Jerry Jarrett. the company was re-organized as TNA Entertainment, LLC, in the process. Dixie Carter was appointed president of TNA Entertainment in spring 2003. Xplosion launched on November 27, 2002, as TNA's first regular cable show and featured exclusive matches taped at the TNA Asylum as well as exclusive interviews with TNA wrestlers and the promotion's original weekly pay-per-view shows took place mostly at the Tennessee State Fairground Sports Arena in Nashville, Tennessee. The last weekly pay-per-view took place on September 8, 2004, with a total of 111 weekly pay-per-views.

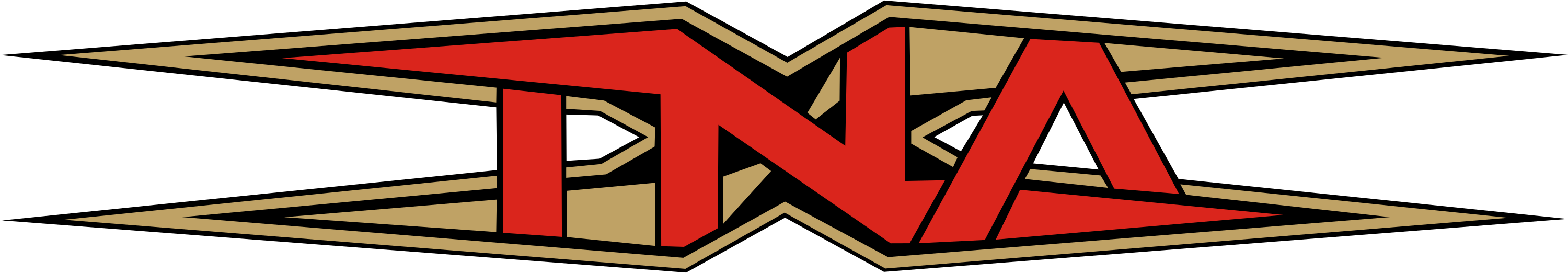
Second logo used from 2003 to 2010

=== Growth and surging popularity (2004–2009) ===
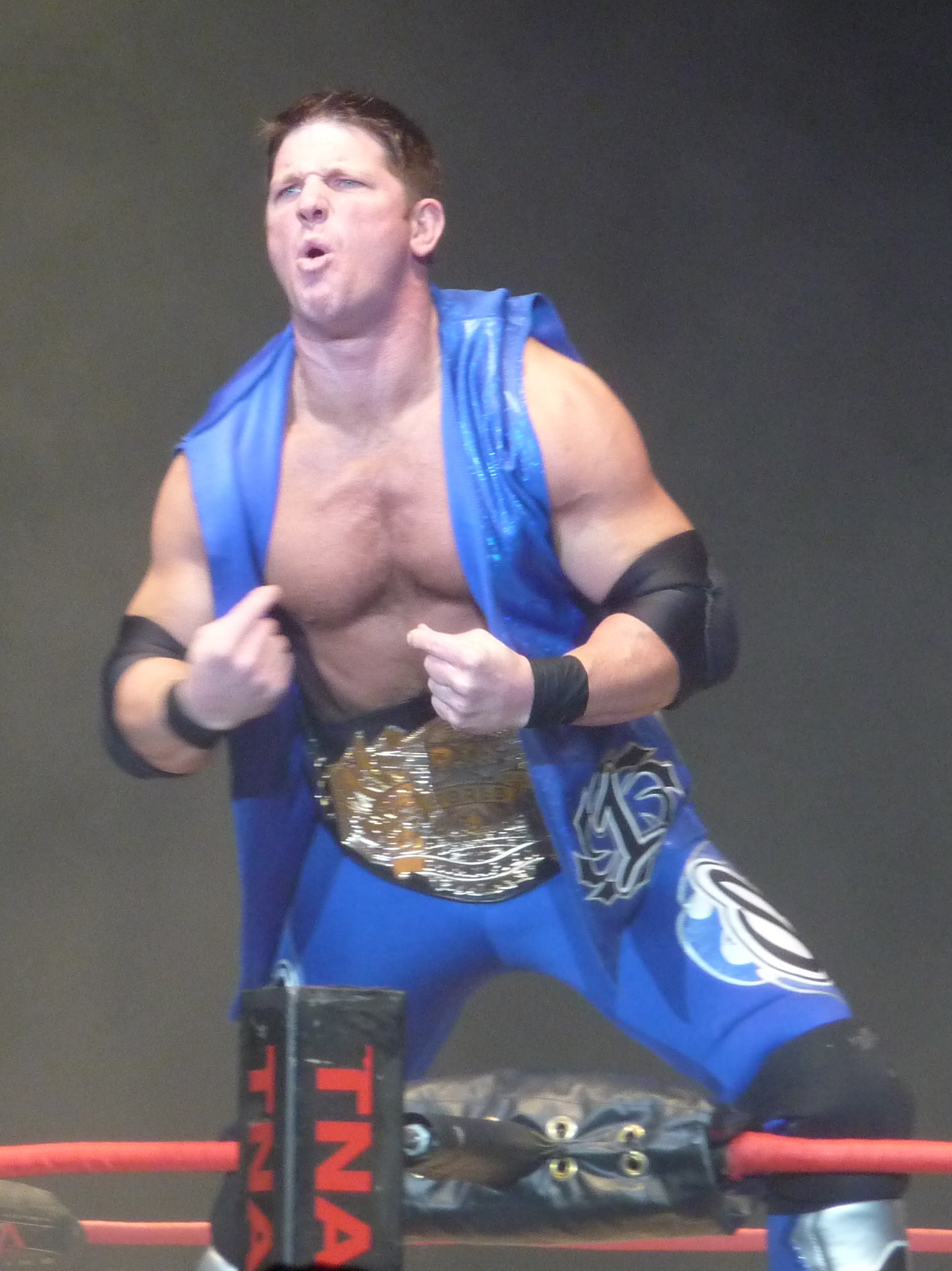
AJ Styles was considered "the cornerstone of the company" during the late 2000s, as well as being TNA's first Grand Slam Champion.

In May 2004, TNA introduced its second weekly television program, Impact! (stylized as iMPACT!), produced at Soundstage 21, nicknamed the "Impact Zone", at Universal Studios Florida and broadcast on Fox Sports Net (FSN). With the show's première, TNA introduced a six-sided wrestling ring, the implementation of the "Fox Box" displaying competitors and timekeeping for the match and a generally more sports-like style than the sports entertainment style exemplified by WWE. In June 2004, TNA issued a press release stating it had signed a master toy license agreement with Toy Biz, with various action figures and playsets releasing between 2005 and 2007. TNA would subsequently discontinue producing weekly pay-per-views in favor of a traditional monthly pay-per-view schedule, beginning with Victory Road in November 2004. TNA's television contract with Fox Sports expired in May 2005. Without television exposure, Impact! would continue to air through webcasts – originally made available via BitTorrent and eventually via RealPlayer – and replace Xplosion's timeslot on Urban America Television.

On September 11, 2005, TNA held its Unbreakable pay-per-view. Unbreakable is remembered for the three-way match main event for the TNA X Division Championship, between AJ Styles, Christopher Daniels, and Samoa Joe, which received a rare 5 Star match rating from wrestling journalist Dave Meltzer, the first one the company received. Later that year, TNA would secure a television deal with Spike TV; Impact! debuted on the network on October 1, 2005. The episode saw Team 3D make their TNA debut. TNA would gain attention for the many high-profile talent that would join the promotion during the show's run on Spike. From 2005 to 2009, these include Kevin Nash, Rhino, Christian Cage, Sting (who made appearances at previous "Asylum" shows), Scott Steiner, Kurt Angle, Booker T, and Mick Foley.

In April 2006, TNA launched a YouTube channel, featuring clips from Impact and exclusive content. Beginning with Bound for Glory in October 2006, TNA began holding select pay-per-view events outside of Orlando, Florida. In January 2007, TNA announced a deal with New Motion, Inc. which led to the introduction of TNA Mobile service. TNA has also launched "TNA U TV"; podcasts aired through YouTube to help promote the company. In August 2007, live-events coordinator Craig Jenkins stated that TNA intended to stage eight pay-per-views and 96 house shows outside Orlando, Florida, in 2008. From 2007 to 2008, TNA first toured Europe, hosting two shows at Porto and Lisbon in Portugal, with TNA later conducting its first tour of England, with most shows selling out which later broke TNA's attendance records with the promotion later touring in Germany, Scotland and Ireland in 2009, France, Wales and the United Arab Emirates in 2010 and Belgium in 2012. In February 2008, Jakks Pacific announced it had signed a multi-year master toy license agreement with TNA, to release products starting in 2010.

In March 2008, Tristar Productions acquired an exclusive license deal to produce and distribute TNA trading cards and memorabilia. On September 9, 2008, Midway Games released the TNA Impact! video game. On October 23, 2008, TNA began producing its programming in HD. In addition, a new HD set for Impact was introduced, including new lighting, and large high-resolution screens. On June 21, 2009, TNA launched an online video-vault subscription-service where subscribers could watch past pay-per-views by choosing one of three payment options.

=== Hulk Hogan and Eric Bischoff leadership, and financial troubles (2010–2016) ===
TNA Leadership 2010 to 2013
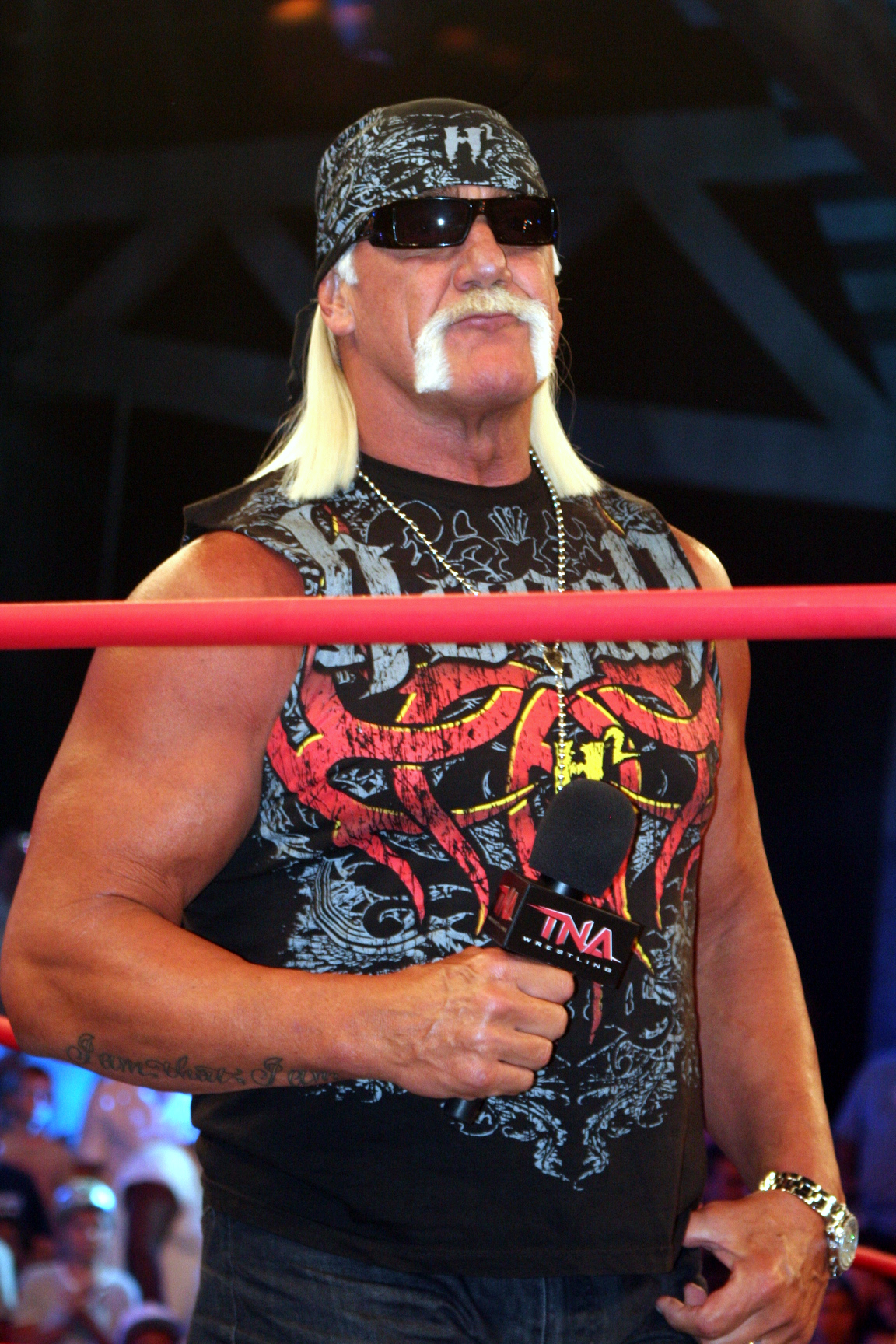
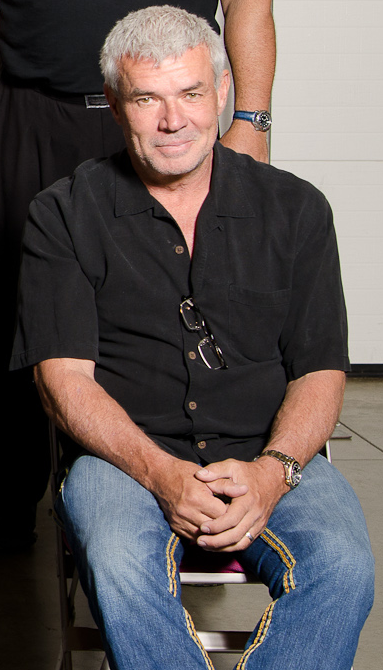
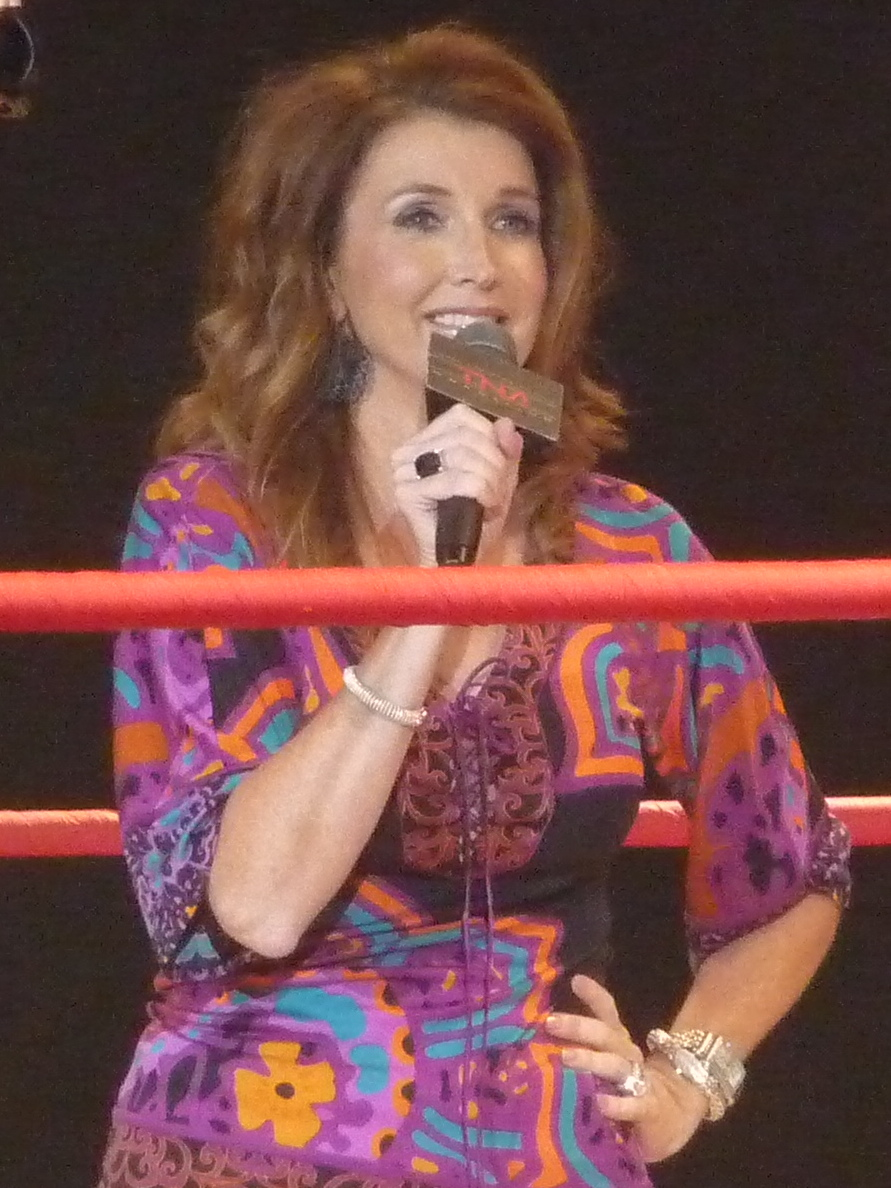
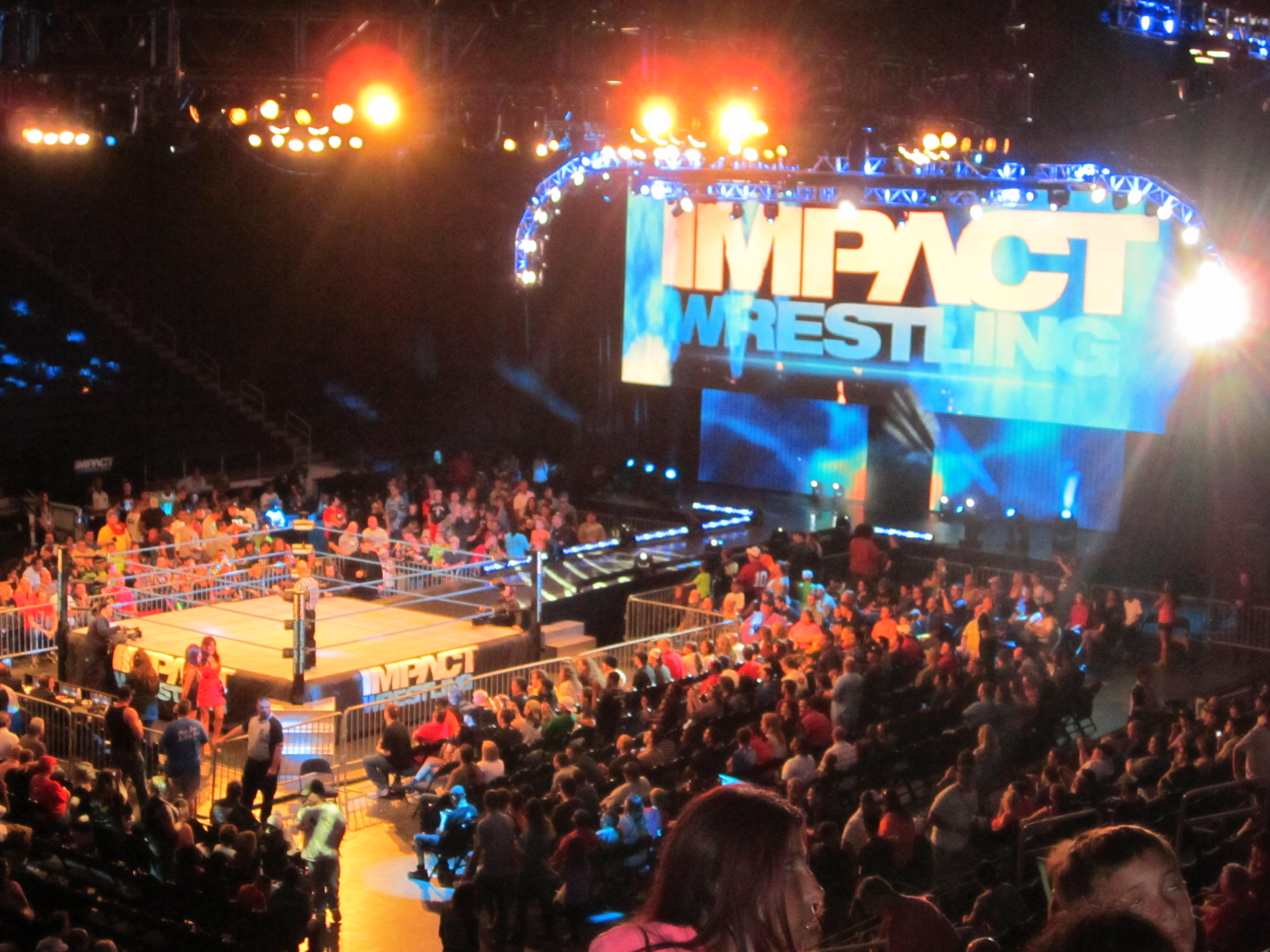
- Top: Hulk Hogan and Eric Bischoff were part of the creative team from 2010 to 2013. During their tenure, Dixie Carter (TNA President from 2002 to 2017) would become an on-screen character.
- Bottom: Under Hogan and Bischoff's tenure, TNA re-branded its flagship program to Impact Wrestling and reintroduced the four-sided ring.

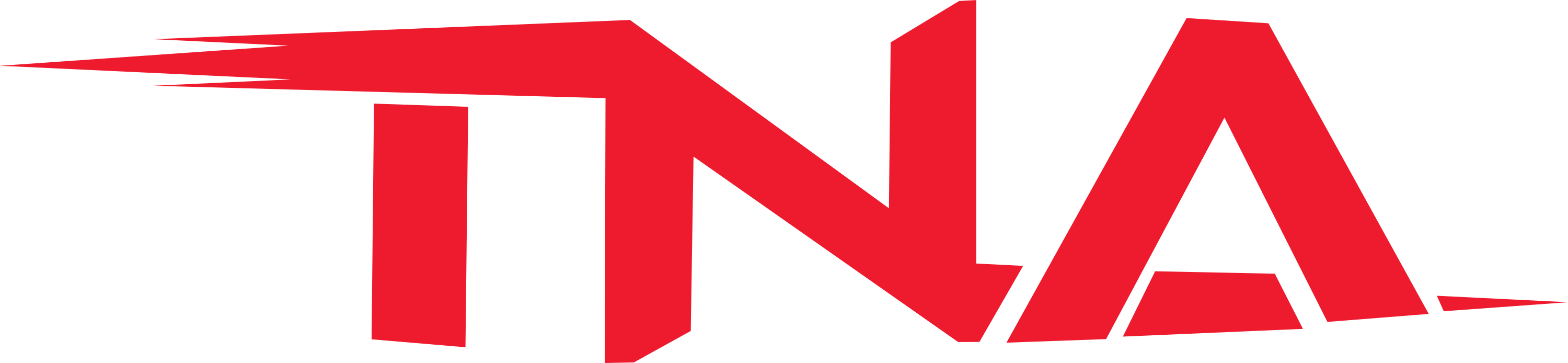
Third logo used from 2010 to 2017

Alternate blue logo used from 2011 to 2017

In October 2009, TNA President Dixie Carter hired Hulk Hogan and former WCW President Eric Bischoff. Hulk Hogan first appeared on the January 4, 2010, episode of Impact!. Both obtained a position behind the scenes; with Bischoff part of creative and Hogan as a consultant. Under their tenure, TNA would see several revamps in 2010. Beginning with Genesis in January, TNA returned to using a four-sided ring. That month, Jakks Pacific announced a five-year agreement to produce TNA action figures. Impact! would also begin airing on Monday nights directly opposite of WWE Raw, marking the first time that two major professional wrestling promotions would go head to head since the launch of WCW Monday Nitro in 1995. The show would permanently move to Mondays on March 8, 2010, Spike would keep the Thursday night slot open for repeats of the Monday night shows. During this time, Ric Flair, Rob Van Dam, Mr. Anderson would make their debuts, while Jeff Hardy would make his return. Impact! would later return to Thursday nights on May 3.

On July 2, 2010, TNA hosted a live house show at MCU Park, which also broke the TNA domestic attendance record at the time and being the most attended live TNA house show in the United States, with a capacity crowd of 5,550. During the May 3, 2011, Impact! television tapings, the show would change its name to Impact Wrestling. On November 7, 2011, TNA revealed that Ohio Valley Wrestling (OVW) would become TNA's official developmental territory. In December 2011, TNA debuted their new India-based subsidiary promotion Ring Ka King. On May 31, 2012, Impact Wrestling began airing live at a new start time of 8 p.m. EST on Thursday nights. The live schedule would continue throughout 2012. In 2012, Panda Energy divested itself of its stake in TNA. Dixie Carter, the daughter of Panda Energy founder Robert Carter, who had been serving as TNA's president, acquired that stake, making her TNA's majority shareholder. In March 2013, TNA began taping Impact from different venues around the United States and terminated its lease with Universal Studios. On March 14, TNA introduced a new universal HD stage which would be used for all weekly programming. On November 2, TNA ended its relationship with OVW.

TNA formed a relationship with Japanese promotion Wrestle-1 beginning in July 2013 with a meeting between TNA founder Jeff Jarrett and Wrestle-1 head Keiji Mutoh, also known by his ring name The Great Muta. It was arranged for Jarrett to wrestle for Wrestle-1 in October 2013. In November, A.J. Styles successfully defended the TNA World Heavyweight Championship at a Wrestle-1 show in Japan. From the period of 2013 to 2014, many well-known names or veterans of the company left TNA. In October 2013, Hulk Hogan's contract with TNA expired, ending his time as creative consultant with the company. In December, AJ Styles left TNA after his contract expired. Styles later said that he could not accept TNA's new contract offer, which would see him take a 60% cut in pay and TNA founder Jeff Jarrett would resign from the company, but remained as minority shareholder until his temporary return on June 24, 2015, with the deal for his return including the transfer of his minority stake to Dixie Carter, making her sole shareholder. The following year Jarrett revealed plans to start a new professional wrestling promotion, Global Force Wrestling. Further departures in 2014 included TNA veterans Sting, Chris Sabin, Hernandez, Christopher Daniels and Kazarian all leaving the company in that year, and the contracts of TNA Hall of Famers Bully Ray and Devon reportedly expired in October 2014, with TNA moving them to the alumni section of their roster in January 2015.

In late July, the TMZ website reported that Spike was not renewing Impact Wrestling beyond October. TNA would refute the report, stating that negotiations were still ongoing. On August 14, Impact Wrestling moved to Wednesday nights. On August 20, TNA signed an extension with Spike until the end of 2014. In November 2014, TNA announced a new agreement with Discovery Communications to distribute its programming in the United States on Destination America and to selected international markets. Spike's outreach at the time was estimated to be more than 97 million homes while Destination America was estimated to reach 59 million households. Impact Wrestling ceased airing new televised events on Spike after the November 19 episode. The final episodes of 2014 were Best of TNA clip shows. On January 7, 2015, Impact Wrestling moved to Destination America, with a live debut from The Manhattan Center's Grand Ballroom in New York City.

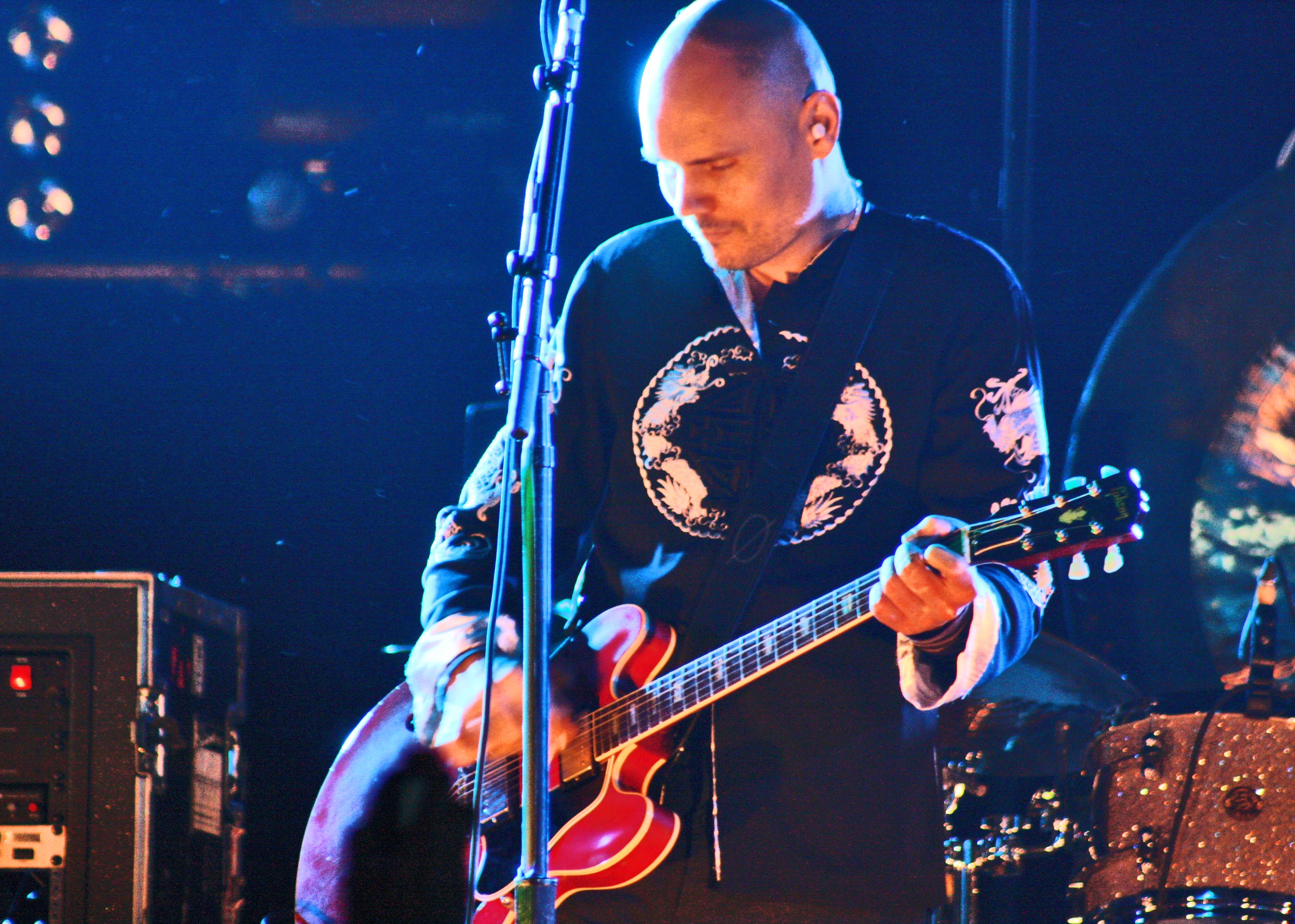
Billy Corgan joined TNA in 2015 and became the promotion's president in late 2016.

In addition to Impact Wrestling, which was now airing on Friday nights, two new shows produced were Impact Wrestling: Unlocked, hosted by Mike Tenay, and TNA Wrestling's Greatest Matches, a series presenting the best matches in the company's history. From December 2014 to March 2015, several employees re-signed with TNA, including Kurt Angle, Jeff Hardy, Gail Kim, Mr. Anderson, Abyss and Matt Hardy. Awesome Kong also re-joined the company following several years of absence. During this period, veteran Samoa Joe and commentator Tazz left the company by mutual consent. On April 27, 2015, Smashing Pumpkins frontman Billy Corgan joined TNA as senior producer of creative and talent development. According to a report on August 7, TNA filed a new business name of Impact Ventures, LLC.

Destination America gained over 41.94 million viewers over the course of 2015's first quarter, making this the channel's best first quarter ever, followed by their best May ever in prime time. In both cases, Discovery Communications touted Impact Wrestling as one of the reasons for the increase in viewers. Despite this success, Discovery Communications dropped Unlocked and Greatest Matches from their programming in May 2015. On November 19, TNA signed a deal with Pop TV to air Impact Wrestling, where it premiered on Tuesday, January 5, 2016, in a live special held at the Sands Hotel and Casino in Bethlehem, Pennsylvania. With this move to Pop, Impact Wrestling introduced a new HD set, graphics and theme music. This show saw the semi-finals and finals of the TNA World Title Series, which was won by Ethan Carter III. Husband and wife team Mike Bennett and Maria Kanellis would debut soon after. Subsequent shows would include episodes taped during a tour of England, which would be the last TNA appearances for Kurt Angle. TNA returned to taping Impact Wrestling at the Impact Zone at Universal Studios in Orlando, Florida, beginning with a live Impact Wrestling on March 15. On March 19, longtime TNA wrestlers Eric Young and Bobby Roode left the promotion after 12 years. On April 22, Velvet Sky, another longtime TNA wrestler, left the company.

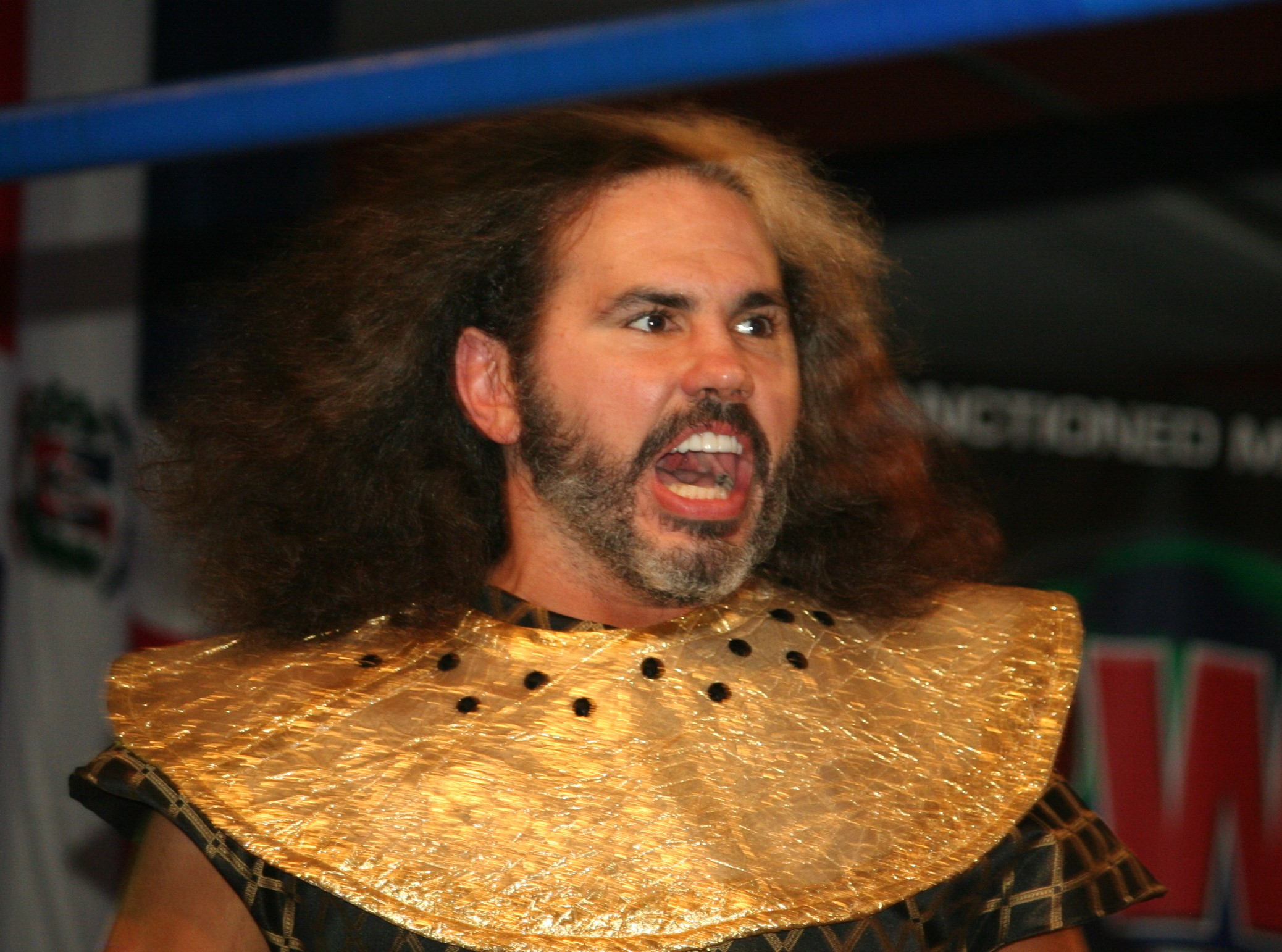
Matt Hardy's critically acclaimed "Broken Gimmick", was credited for TNA's highest ratings on Pop TV.

It was reported near the beginning of 2016 that Aroluxe Marketing, a Brentwood, Tennessee–based marketing agency, had taken a stake in TNA at the start of 2016 in return for providing partial funding, as well as taking over TNA's production operations. It was reported in June 2016 that Smashing Pumpkins frontman Billy Corgan acquired a minority stake in TNA from Dixie Carter, but he had instead provided a loan to Carter. Then on August 12, Billy Corgan became the promotion's new president, while Carter transitioned from president to the company's new chairwoman and chief strategy officer. It was reported on September 16 by the New York Post that Canada's Fight Network, through its parent company, Anthem Sports & Entertainment Corporation, had taken a stake in TNA. On October 13, Corgan sued TNA due to unpaid debt which Corgan claimed TNA had defaulted on. The State of Tennessee also put a lien on TNA for unpaid taxes. Anthem Sports & Entertainment, parent company of Impact Wrestling's Canadian broadcaster, Fight Network, offered to help TNA and repay Corgan for the loans, while also offering additional financial assistance to TNA to help keep them from filing for bankruptcy. On October 31, Corgan lost his injunction that kept TNA from selling the company, but TNA was required to pay Corgan back by November 1. It was possible that one of the other minority owners could pay Corgan, effectively making them the majority owner of TNA.

On November 3, the company revealed that Anthem Sports & Entertainment provided a credit facility to fund operations for TNA and that Corgan was removed as the promotion's president. However, Corgan himself stated that neither TNA nor Anthem Sports & Entertainment had yet repaid the $2.7 million debt that was owed to him by TNA and, as such, he was considering suing, as well as converting the debt into a 36 percent stake. As the result of a settlement between Corgan and TNA, Anthem Sports & Entertainment acquired the loans Corgan made to Carter in the process.

=== Acquisition by Anthem and re-brandings (2017–2023) ===
Impact Wrestling owl logo briefly used in February 2017

Impact Wrestling logo used from March 2017 to April 2017 before merging with Global Force Wrestling. Continued to be used until 2018 after Anthem dropped GFW from its branding

GFW logo briefly used from July 2017 to August 2017 following Jeff Jarrett's departure

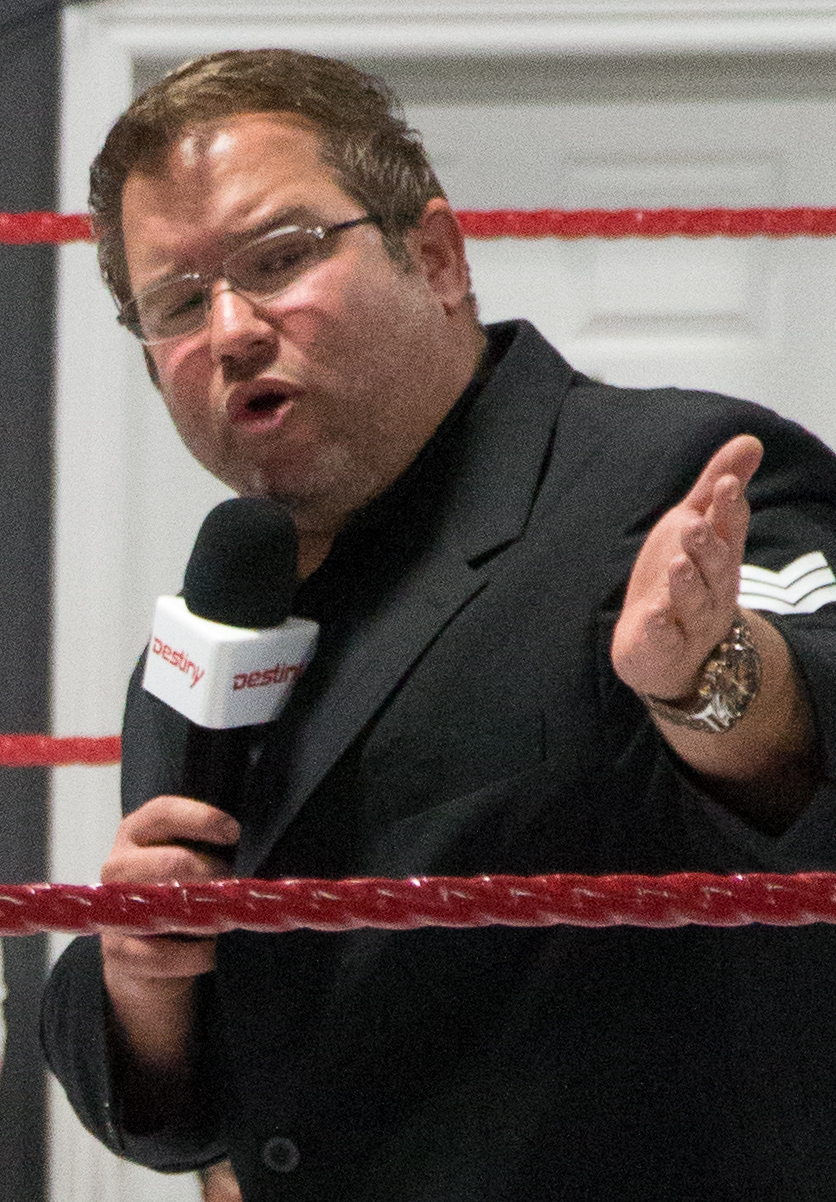
Scott D'Amore served in various executive roles from 2017 to 2024.

Anthem Sports & Entertainment, a company owned by former Canwest CEO Leonard Asper, purchased a majority stake of TNA, re-organizing TNA's parent company with Aroluxe having 10 percent while Carter retaining a five percent minority stake in the company, but resigned as chairwoman after 14 years with the company, while joining the advisory board of Fight Media Group. The promotion's parent company, TNA Entertainment, was changed firstly to Impact Ventures and then to Anthem Wrestling Exhibitions, LLC., with Anthem's Executive Vice President Ed Nordholm becoming President of the new parent company. Shortly after Anthem's acquisition of TNA, it was re-branded to Impact Wrestling. On January 5, 2017 Jeff Jarrett was brought back by Anthem to serve as a consultant and later promoted to executive producer and chief creative officer. Anthem re-branded the promotion as Impact Wrestling, after its primary television series two months later. Wrestlers Drew Galloway, Matt Hardy, Jeff Hardy, Jade, Crazzy Steve, Mike Bennett and Maria Kanellis left the company during this period.

In April 2017, it was announced on Impact! that the promotion would "merge" with Jarrett's newer Global Force Wrestling (GFW) promotion. In the lead-up to the Slammiversary XV PPV, Anthem officially announced its intent to acquire GFW to formalize the merger. The company subsequently announced that they were re-branding again and taking the GFW name in June; the re-branding was short-lived as they severed ties with Jarrett that October and the deal for Anthem to acquire GFW was never completed. During that time, Anthem launched the Global Wrestling Network, a new streaming service which featured content from to their tape library and other sources. Jarrett subsequently filed a lawsuit against Anthem in the District Court of Tennessee for copyright infringement over the GFW rights; the lawsuit was ultimately settled out of court.

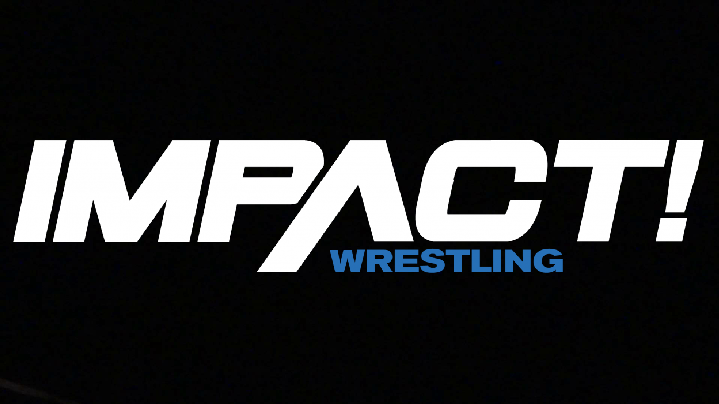
Impact Wrestling logo used from 2018 to 2019

Don Callis and Scott D'Amore became executive vice presidents in January 2018, taking charge of Impact Wrestling's day-to-day operations. At the first tapings under their tenure, the company reverted to a traditional four-sided ring, and the show also saw the return of former World Heavyweight Champion Austin Aries, as well the debuts of new wrestlers such as Kiera Hogan, Su Yung, Pentagón Jr., Fénix and Brian Cage. The company also announced a partnership with live streaming service Twitch to produce content for their platform, starting with Brace for Impact, which was co-promoted with New Jersey–based promotion WrestlePro. Their first live show was Impact vs. Lucha Underground, a co-promoted show with Lucha Underground. Impact! subsequently moved to Pursuit Channel beginning January 11, 2019. Two months later, the promotion announced that Ohio Valley Wrestling (OVW) would serve as its developmental territory once again. In May, Impact Plus replaced the Global Wrestling Network as the official streaming app for the promotion. Impact! began airing on Anthem-owned AXS TV after Bound for Glory in October.

Logo used from 2019 to 2023

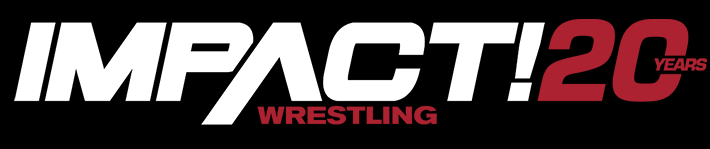
20th anniversary logo, used in 2022 while under the Impact Wrestling banner

Due to the COVID-19 pandemic, Impact would hold events behind closed doors at Skyway Studios in Nashville. During the pandemic, the promotion cancelled its planned TNA: There's No Place Like Home event, and Tessa Blanchard, who became the first woman to win the promotion's World Championship earlier that year at Hard to Kill, was fired and stripped of the championship after a long absence. Slammiversary saw the returns of The Motor City Machine Guns, Eric Young, Doc Gallows and EC3, as well as the debuts of Karl Anderson and Heath Slater. After the events of AEW Winter Is Coming on December 2, 2020, Impact began a partnership with All Elite Wrestling (AEW), which lasted until Bound for Glory 2021. AEW-contracted wrestlers Kenny Omega and Christian Cage held the Impact World Championship during this time; this marked Cage's first in-ring return to the promotion since 2008. In February 2021, Impact launched Before the Impact (abbreviated as BTI), and Xplosion was canceled after 19 years the following month. During No Surrender Impact announced a new partnership with New Japan Pro-Wrestling (NJPW). Don Callis' time as Impact executive vice president and on-air talent ended in May.

Slammiversary 2021 marked the return of in-person spectators for the first time since the start of the COVID-19 pandemic. That month, BTI and Impact! would crossover for the first time, when Josh Alexander faced T. J. Perkins for the TNA X Division Championship in Impact's first-ever 60-minute Iron man match, which began on BTI and concluded in the opening minutes of Impact!. Impact subsequently announced the end of their partnership with Twitch that August and launched a new YouTube membership program called "Impact Wrestling Insiders". In November 2022, Impact and DAZN signed a partnership where the streaming service will distribute select non-live shows in most countries except the United States, South Asia and sub-Saharan Africa. On May 8, 2023, Impact announced their first ever Australian shows named Down Under Tour, a four-day tour with two marquee wrestling shows that took part on June 30 and July 1 in Wagga Wagga, New South Wales.

=== Return to TNA (since 2023) ===
At the conclusion of Bound for Glory on October 21, 2023, Impact announced that it would revive the Total Nonstop Action Wrestling (TNA) name. From October 26 to 28, Impact held events in Scotland and England, marking their first United Kingdom tour since 2015. In December 2023, the promotion announced it had signed a new toy license with PowerTown, to release its first line of product in August 2024. The name change to TNA took effect in January 2024, with the first event under the reinstated TNA banner being Hard To Kill. On February 7, Anthem Sports & Entertainment announced that Scott D'Amore's contract with TNA was terminated, with D'Amore being removed from his position as President of TNA, later being replaced by Anthony Cicione.

In 2024, TNA began a talent exchange with WWE's NXT brand, with TNA wrestlers beginning to appear on WWE NXT and at NXT events, and NXT wrestlers appearing on TNA programming. A multi-year partnership between TNA and WWE was officially announced on January 16, 2025. A TNA title was defended on WWE programming for the first time the following month, with Moose defending the TNA X Division Championship against WWE's Lexis King.

On February 12, 2025, Cicione resigned from his position as President of TNA, and has been replaced by Carlos Silva. On December 2, 2025, TNA and AMC Networks announced a multi-year deal to bring Impact! to AMC and AMC+ beginning January 15, 2026. AMC was available in approximately 60 million U.S. pay-TV households as of December 2024, giving Impact! its largest potential cable TV audience since the show's run on Spike TV (now Paramount Network) from 2005 to 2014. The AMC premiere was seen by 173.000 viewers, with a 0.04 share in the 18-49 demo.

== Television and touring schedule ==
=== Weekly pay-per-views (2002–2004) ===
From June 2002 until September 2004, the promotion's original weekly pay-per-view shows took place mostly at the Tennessee State Fairgrounds Sports Arena in Nashville, Tennessee, nicknamed the "TNA Asylum". There were a total of 111 weekly pay-per-views.

=== Impact! and Xplosion in Universal Studios (2004–2013) ===
From June 2004 to March 2013, TNA programming was taped at Universal Studios Florida's Soundstage 21 in Orlando, Florida. The Soundstages at Universal were dubbed the "Impact Zone" by the company. Pay-per-views were also broadcast from that location until October 2006, when Bound for Glory emanated from the Compuware Arena in Plymouth, Michigan. Initially, TNA worked with Hermie Sadler's United Wrestling Federation in 2005 to create house shows. TNA permitted the usage of the ring and for championships to be defended at these events. TNA started running independent house shows on March 17, 2006 at the Compuware Arena in Plymouth, Michigan and was booked by the Detroit-based horrorcore hip-hop duo, the Insane Clown Posse.

TNA continued to work with the UWF and promote independent shows at the same time, until 2007. In 2007, TNA first toured Europe, hosting two shows at Porto and Lisbon in Portugal with APW Wrestling. In 2008, TNA wrestlers appeared at Wrestle Kingdom II in Japan. Later on in 2008, TNA conducted its first tour of England, with most shows selling out. The promotion first toured Germany, Scotland and Ireland in 2009, France, Wales and the United Arab Emirates in 2010 and Belgium in 2012. In August 2007, live-events coordinator Craig Jenkins stated that TNA intended to stage eight pay-per-views and 96 house shows outside Orlando, Florida, in 2008. In 2009, during their United Kingdom tour, a house show at Wembley Arena in London broke TNA's attendance records. On July 2, 2010, MCU Park hosted a live TNA house show, which also broke the TNA domestic attendance record at the time and is currently the most attended live TNA house show in the United States, with a capacity crowd of 5,550.

=== Outside the Impact Zone (2011–2017) ===
Beginning in 2011, TNA held sporadic tapings on the road beginning with a double taping of Impact at the Von Braun Center in Huntsville, Alabama on August 25, 2011 and later on two more tapings on September 21, 2011 at the Knoxville Civic Coliseum in Knoxville, Tennessee and October 26, 2011 at the Macon Coliseum in Macon, Georgia. On January 28, 2012, TNA held its first Impact taping outside the United States as they taped two Impact episodes at Wembley Arena in London, England with an attendance of 7,000. On January 31, 2013, TNA announced that they would tape their programming in different venues around the United States, with the first live show being held on March 14, in the Sears Centre Arena in Hoffman Estates, Illinois. Unable to cover the rising costs of taping on the road, TNA would return to Universal Studios on November 21, 2013. The promotion would continue to occasionally tape programming from other venues; such as the Sands Casino Event Center in Bethlehem, Pennsylvania, the Manhattan Center's Grand Ballroom in New York City, the Von Braun Center in Huntsville, Alabama as part of a two-part Genesis special, the SSE Hydro in Glasgow, Scotland, the Manchester Arena in Manchester, and the Wembley Arena in London as part of a January 2015 tour. In June 2017, the promotion, having been rebranded Impact Wrestling, held a show in India, becoming the first major U.S. promotion to hold events in that country. After Bound for Glory 2017 in November 2017, Impact would do a set of tapings in Ottawa.

=== Post-Universal Studios (2018–present) ===
Following the 2018 Redemption pay-per-view, Impact Wrestling would return to touring, taping in various smaller venues. The year's taping and major event locations included Windsor, Ontario, Canada, Toronto, Ontario, Canada, Mexico City, Mexico, New York City, New York, and Las Vegas. In 2019, Impact Wrestling held tapings and major events in Philadelphia, Dallas, New York City, Houston, Windsor, Ontario, Canada, Mexico City, Mexico, Nashville, Tennessee, Toronto, Rahway, New Jersey, Fort Campbell, Owensboro, Kentucky, and other venues in Ontario.

==== Effects of COVID-19 ====
During the height of the COVID-19 pandemic, Impact Wrestling programming was taped and held behind closed doors at Skyway Studios in the promotion's home base of Nashville, Tennessee from April 2020 through June 2021. Beginning with Slammiversary in July 2021, fans were allowed in attendance at Skyway. On October 23, 2021, Impact held their first event outside of Nashville in a year and a half with Bound for Glory, which took place just outside of Las Vegas in Sunrise Manor, Nevada. After a brief Las Vegas area residency to end 2021, Impact resumed a full schedule of live touring in January 2022.

In March 2023, Impact held events in Windsor, Ontario, Canada. This would mark their first shows outside of the United States in three years. Numerous other shows were held throughout Canada all through the year. Impact held its first ever shows in Australia on June 30 and July 1, 2023. From October 26 to 28, 2023, Impact held events in Scotland and England, marking their first United Kingdom tour since 2015. On November 26, 2023, Impact and partner promotion Lucha Libre AAA Worldwide (AAA), co-promoted the Ultra Clash supershow in the Monterrey, Mexico area, marking Impact's first show in Mexico since 2019.

== Features ==
=== X Division ===
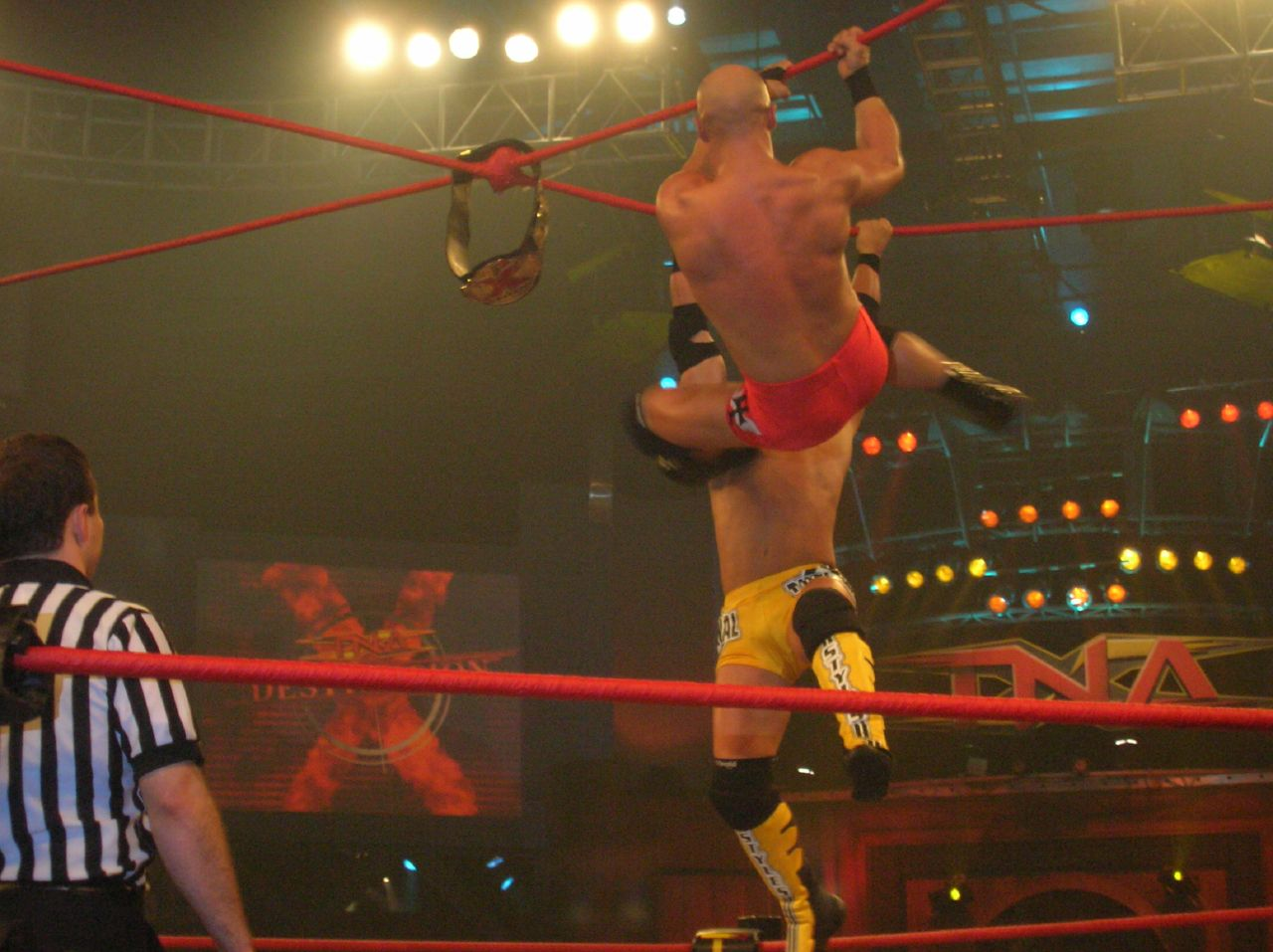
High-flying, high risk moves are a centerpiece of the X Division.

The X Division is known for its high-flying, high-risk style matches. While most wrestlers who perform are under 220 lb (100 kg), thus being cruiserweights, Impact would emphasize the high-risk nature of the moves that these wrestlers perform by removing all restraints from competing in the X Division and allowing wrestlers to perform almost stunt-like moves. Because of this, wrestlers such as Samoa Joe, billed at 280 lb (130 kg), Kurt Angle, billed at 230 lb (100 kg), and Abyss, billed at 350 lb (160 kg), have also competed in the division. The slogan "It's not about weight limits, it's about no limits" has been used throughout the years to describe the division. In August 2011, a 225 lb (102 kg) weight limit was introduced, though it was quietly repealed in March 2012. Further changes introduced in March 2013, including a weight limit of 230 lbs, and all matches being contested as triple threat matches, were also repealed in August.

=== Six-sided ring ===
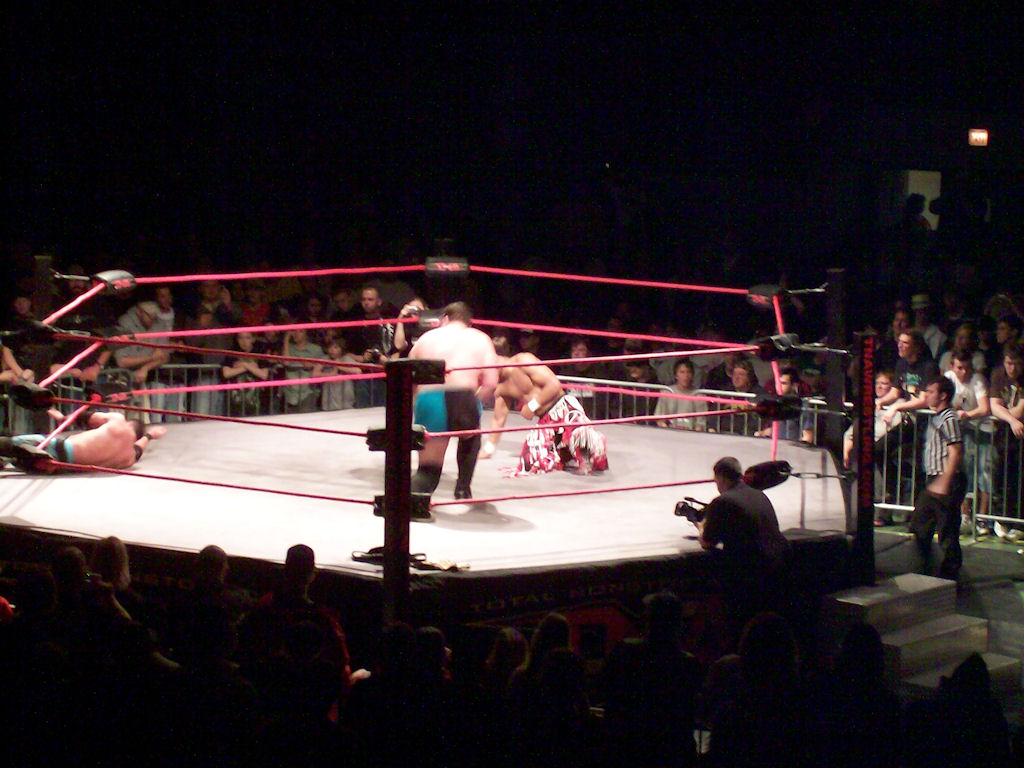
For much of its history, TNA Wrestling used a hexagonal ring.

From the promotion's first show in June 2002, a standard four-sided wrestling ring was used. In June 2004, with the premiere of Impact!, TNA switched to a six-sided ring, as occasionally used in AAA. The six-sided ring would be retired in January 2010, only making a brief return for the 2011 Destination X event. In 2014, after a fan-voted poll to determine what type of ring the company would use from June 2014, the six-sided ring would return. The promotion would continue to use the six-sided ring until January 2018, when it went back to a traditional four-sided ring.

=== Knockouts ===
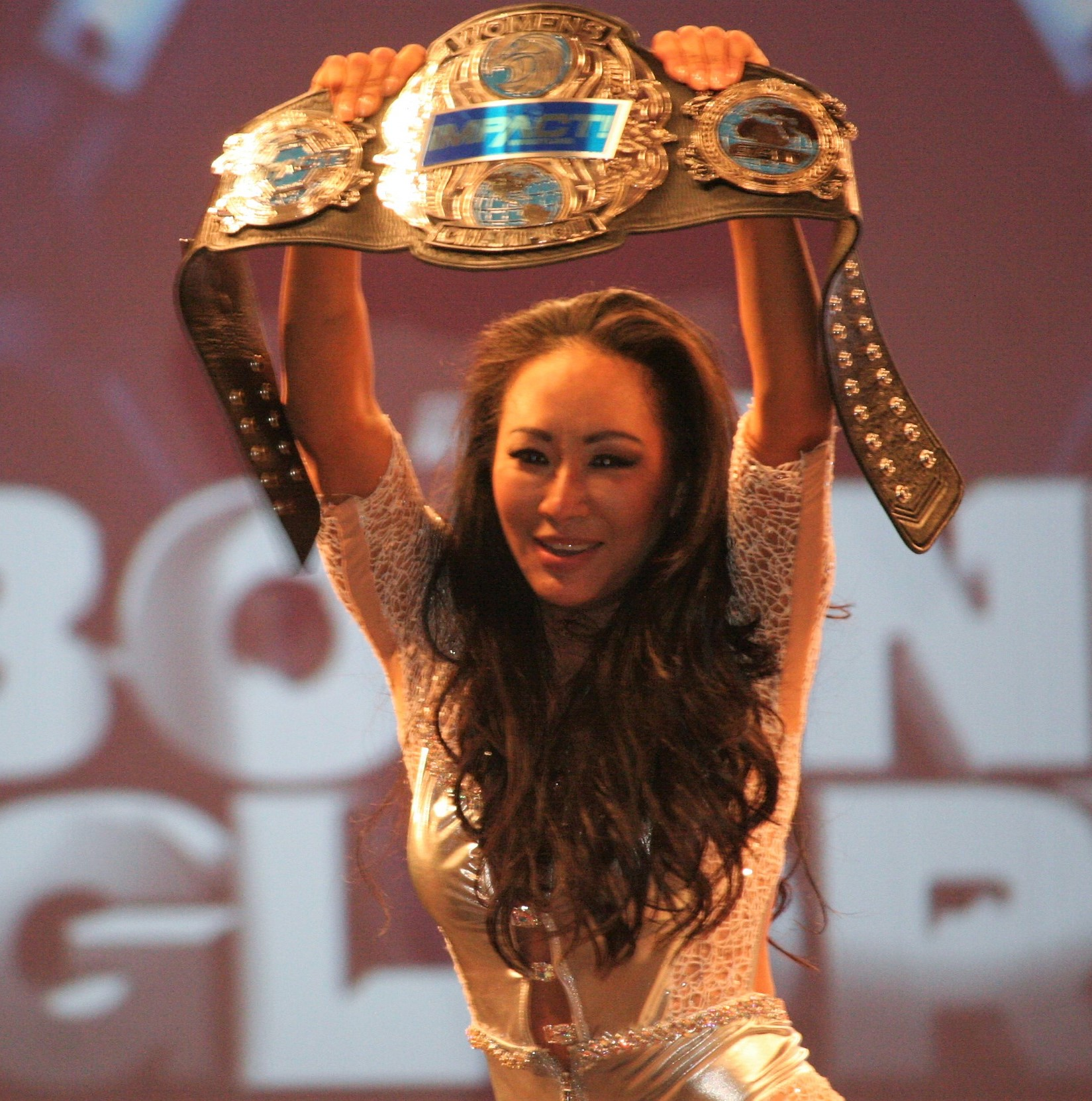
The inaugural and 7-time TNA Knockouts World Championship holder and TNA Hall of Famer Gail Kim in 2017

Knockout is a term used by the company to refer to its female talent. The term is applied universally to wrestlers, backstage interviewers, and managers/valets. The division was established in 2002 mostly consisting of female valets and managers who were not competing often during the company's inception in 2002 until 2006; it became a permanent women's division in 2007 known as the TNA Knockouts Division that consisted of women such as Gail Kim, Angelina Love, Velvet Sky and Awesome Kong. The division features the TNA Knockouts World Championship and the TNA Knockouts World Tag Team Championships. The TNA Knockouts were formerly known as the Women of TNA, and Ladies of TNA.

=== Contracts ===
TNA wrestlers are forbidden by contract from working for other companies with televised wrestling shows, but are free to perform non-televised work for any other independent wrestling promotions, domestic or international, as well as televised events held by foreign promotions that Impact Wrestling is linked to or has a working relationship with (such as AAA and NOAH). Many Impact wrestlers perform regularly for various promotions on the independent circuit in addition to Impact Wrestling weekly shows. In 2012, the company changed its policy, preventing its talent from appearing at any independent events that are later released on DVD. Top wrestlers have guaranteed contracts, but the majority of the roster are paid on a per appearance basis. Impact wrestlers are classified as independent contractors and are not offered health coverage through the promotion. As of November 2017, Impact Wrestling contracts give the performers complete ownership over all intellectual property associated with their characters.

=== Hall of Fame ===
The Hall of Fame was introduced on May 31, 2012. As part of a yearly process, selected inductees are chosen based on their overall contributions to TNA's history. On June 10, at Slammiversary 10, Sting was revealed as the first inductee into the Hall of Fame and his formal induction took place at Bound for Glory in October 2012.

== Partnerships ==
In early 2006, the promotion began a collaboration with Hermie Sadler's United Wrestling Federation. The agreement permitted UWF to use the TNA logo on posters and signage, as well as to use the six-sided ring with TNA branding. These shows were mainly promoted as 'UWF/TNA' events. The TNA name agreement ended at the end of 2006, as TNA began to promote their own house show events, though UWF still used a six-sided ring. These events were recorded and released on DVD by Highsports. They would continue to work with United Wrestling Federation and promote independent shows at the same time until 2007. TNA has worked with several wrestling promotions, with championships from those promotions sometimes having been defended at TNA events. Among the organizations TNA has had working relationships with are Mexico's Consejo Mundial de Lucha Libre (CMLL) from 2007 to 2009 and The Crash, Japan's Inoki Genome Federation (IGF), New Japan Pro-Wrestling (NJPW), Wrestle-1 (W-1), Pro Wrestling Noah (Noah), United States' the original Global Force Wrestling (another promotion founded by Jeff Jarrett), OMEGA Championship Wrestling (owned by Matt Hardy, Jeff Hardy and Gregory Helms) and Evolve Wrestling.

The initial relationship with NJPW lasted from 2008 to 2011. Then-known as TNA, the promotion would send wrestlers to participate in NJPW's annual Wrestle Kingdom events, as well as NJPW sending future IWGP Heavyweight Champion Kazuchika Okada on a training excursion to TNA. The relationship would be strained, when IWGP Tag Team Champions Team 3D were held off of a New Japan tour in favor of appearing on Impact Wrestling tapings and Okada was given the gimmick of "Okato", where he dressed similar to The Green Hornet's sidekick Kato. a decision Executive Vice President Scott D'Amore has since apologized for on behalf of the previous regime. In February 2021, Impact would re-establish its relationship with NJPW, with NJPW later forgiving the incidents that happened under the previous regime. This partnership would last until December 2024, when NJPW's contract to air on TNA's co-owned TV home AXS TV expired, and was not renewed.

On March 2, 2014, TNA collaborated with Wrestle-1 in producing the Kaisen: Outbreak supershow in Tokyo, Japan, where three TNA championships were defended. In May 2015, it was reported that the relationship between TNA and Wrestle-1 had ended. Since 2015, the promotion has had a working agreement with Mexico's Lucha Libre AAA Worldwide (AAA) and in 2018, announced a partnership with the AAA-affiliated Lucha Underground, allowing their wrestlers from the show to appear for Impact on a regular basis. In April 2018, the two promotions held Impact vs Lucha Underground from WrestleCon in New Orleans to a sell out crowd. On November 26, 2023, Impact and partner promotion Lucha Libre AAA Worldwide (AAA), co-promoted the Ultra Clash supershow in the Monterrey, Mexico area, marking Impact's first show in Mexico since 2019.

Since 2018, Impact has established working relationships with a number of promotions to co-promote house shows, Twitch specials, the final Impact One Night Only events, and Impact Plus Monthly Specials. These promotions include, Future Stars of Wrestling, Smash Wrestling, AML Wrestling, Superkick'd, Border City Wrestling, WrestleCade, Rocky Mountain Pro, Rockstar Pro Wrestling, WrestlePro, Wrestling Revolver, RISE, Destiny Wrestling, Big Time Wrestling, DEFY Wrestling and House of Hardcore. Impact Wrestling would begin a partnership with All Elite Wrestling (AEW) in December 2020, with its wrestlers and titles appearing on Impact programming. In October 2021, the working relationship between Impact and AEW quietly ended following Bound for Glory.

On the January 7, 2022, episode of SmackDown, it was announced that Knockouts Champion Mickie James would enter the 2022 Royal Rumble match. Both WWE's official Twitter account and Impact's website confirmed this soon after, with the former recognizing James as an Impact champion. Two years later, Knockouts Champion Jordynne Grace would enter in the Royal Rumble. In 2024, TNA and WWE began a wider talent exchange, with several TNA wrestlers appearing on WWE's NXT brand, and NXT wrestlers making periodic appearances at TNA events. On January 16, 2025, WWE announced a multi-year partnership with TNA that allows NXT wrestlers and TNA wrestlers to appear in NXT shows, TNA iMPACT!, select WWE Premium Live Events, and TNA pay-per-views.

== Video games ==
List of video games based on the company
Year	Title	Developer	Console
Main series
2008	TNA Wrestling	Longtail Studios	Mobile phone, iOS
2008	TNA Impact!	Midway Studios Los Angeles	PS3, Xbox 360, Wii, PS2
2010	TNA Impact!: Cross The Line	SouthPeak Games	PSP, Nintendo DS
2011	TNA Wrestling Impact!	Namco Networks	Android, iOS

== Championships and accomplishments ==
=== Current champions ===
As of November 18, 2026

=== Men's division ===
Singles

Championship	Current champion(s)	Reign	Date won	Days held	Location	Notes	Ref.
TNA World Championship	Leon Slater	1	October 11, 2026	38	Tampa, Florida	Defeated Nic Nemeth in his Option C title opportunity at Bound for Glory.	
TNA International Championship	Jason Hotch	2	October 11, 2026	38	Tampa, Florida	Defeated previous champion Mustafa Ali, John Skyler, and Special Agent 0 in The Order 4-way match at Bound for Glory.	
TNA X Division Championship	Amazing Red	4	October 11, 2026	38	Tampa, Florida	Defeated BDE, Cedric Alexander, Fabian Aichner, KC Navarro, Rich Swann, and Ryan Nemeth in a seven-way scramble at Bound for Glory to win the vacant title.	

Tag team

Championship	Current champions	Reign	Date won	Days held	Location	Notes	Ref.
TNA World Tag Team Championship	The Nemeths (Nic Nemeth and Ryan Nemeth)	2	August 23, 2026	87	Chicago, Illinois	Defeated The Hardys (Matt Hardy and Jeff Hardy) in a Steel Cage tornado tag team match at Lockdown.	

=== Knockouts (Women's) division ===
Singles

Championship	Current champion	Reign	Date won	Days held	Location	Notes	Ref.
TNA Knockouts World Championship	Indi Hartwell	1	October 11, 2026	38	Tampa, Florida	Defeated Xia Brookside at Bound for Glory.	
TNA Knockouts Television Championship	M by Elegance	1	August 27, 2026	83	Brampton, Ontario, Canada	Defeated Jada Stone in the tournament final on Thursday Night Impact! to become the inaugural champion.	

Tag team

Championship	Current champions	Reign	Date won	Days held	Location	Notes	Ref.
TNA Knockouts World Tag Team Championship	Apex (Zoey Serrano and Shayna Baszler)	1	October 11, 2026	38	Tampa, Florida	Defeated Allie and Kiera Hogan at Bound for Glory.	

== See also ==
- World Wrestling All-Stars (WWA) – Australian professional wrestling promotion
- Xcitement Wrestling Federation (XWF) – Professional wrestling promotion
