= The Horror Show at Extreme Rules =

2020 WWE pay-per-view and livestreaming event

- Promotional poster featuring Bray Wyatt, Sasha Banks, Braun Strowman, Apollo Crews, Asuka, and Drew McIntyre.
- Promotion: WWE
- Brand(s): Raw; SmackDown
- Date: July 19, 2020
- City: Orlando, Florida
- Venue: WWE Performance Center
- Attendance: 30 (behind closed doors) (Note: The event was held without a paying audience due to the COVID-19 pandemic in the United States, though it featured a live crowd of WWE wrestlers and trainees.)

WWE event chronology
| ← Previous; Backlash | Next → NXT TakeOver XXX |

Extreme Rules chronology
| ← Previous; 2019 | Next → 2021 |

The Horror Show at Extreme Rules was a 2020 professional wrestling pay-per-view (PPV) and livestreaming event produced by WWE, held for wrestlers from the promotion's main roster brands, Raw and SmackDown. It was the 12th annual Extreme Rules event and was broadcast on July 19, 2020. While the majority of the event aired live from the WWE Performance Center in Orlando, Florida, the main event was pre-recorded at an undisclosed location about two hours outside of Orlando on July 16–17. This was the only edition of Extreme Rules to have an altered title, and in addition to the event's regular theme of featuring various hardcore-based matches, the event also had horror-themed hardcore matches.

The event was originally scheduled to be held at the SAP Center in San Jose, California; however, the Santa Clara County government restricted public gatherings indefinitely due to the COVID-19 pandemic. As a result, and just like the majority of Raw and SmackDown's other shows since mid-March, the event was moved to the WWE Performance Center. It was subsequently WWE's final PPV and livestreaming event for the two brands to be held at the Performance Center, as their events were moved to Orlando's Amway Center the following month in a bio-secure bubble called the WWE ThunderDome. WWE's NXT brand would permanently move its shows to the Performance Center in October in its own version of the ThunderDome called the Capitol Wrestling Center. This would also be the final Extreme Rules to livestream on the American version of the WWE Network, which merged under Peacock in April 2021.

Seven matches were contested at the event, including one on the Kickoff pre-show. Four of the main card's matches were contested under a hardcore/horror stipulation. In the main event, Bray Wyatt, who briefly returned to his cult leader persona for this match, defeated Braun Strowman in a Wyatt Swamp Fight, which was produced off-site as a cinematic match. In the penultimate match, Drew McIntyre defeated Dolph Ziggler to retain Raw's WWE Championship in an Extreme Rules match in which the stipulation only applied to Ziggler; McIntyre had to wrestle under regular singles match rules. In another prominent match, Seth Rollins defeated Rey Mysterio in an Eye for an Eye match, and in the opening bout, Cesaro and Shinsuke Nakamura defeated The New Day (Big E and Kofi Kingston) in a tables match to win the SmackDown Tag Team Championship.

== Production ==
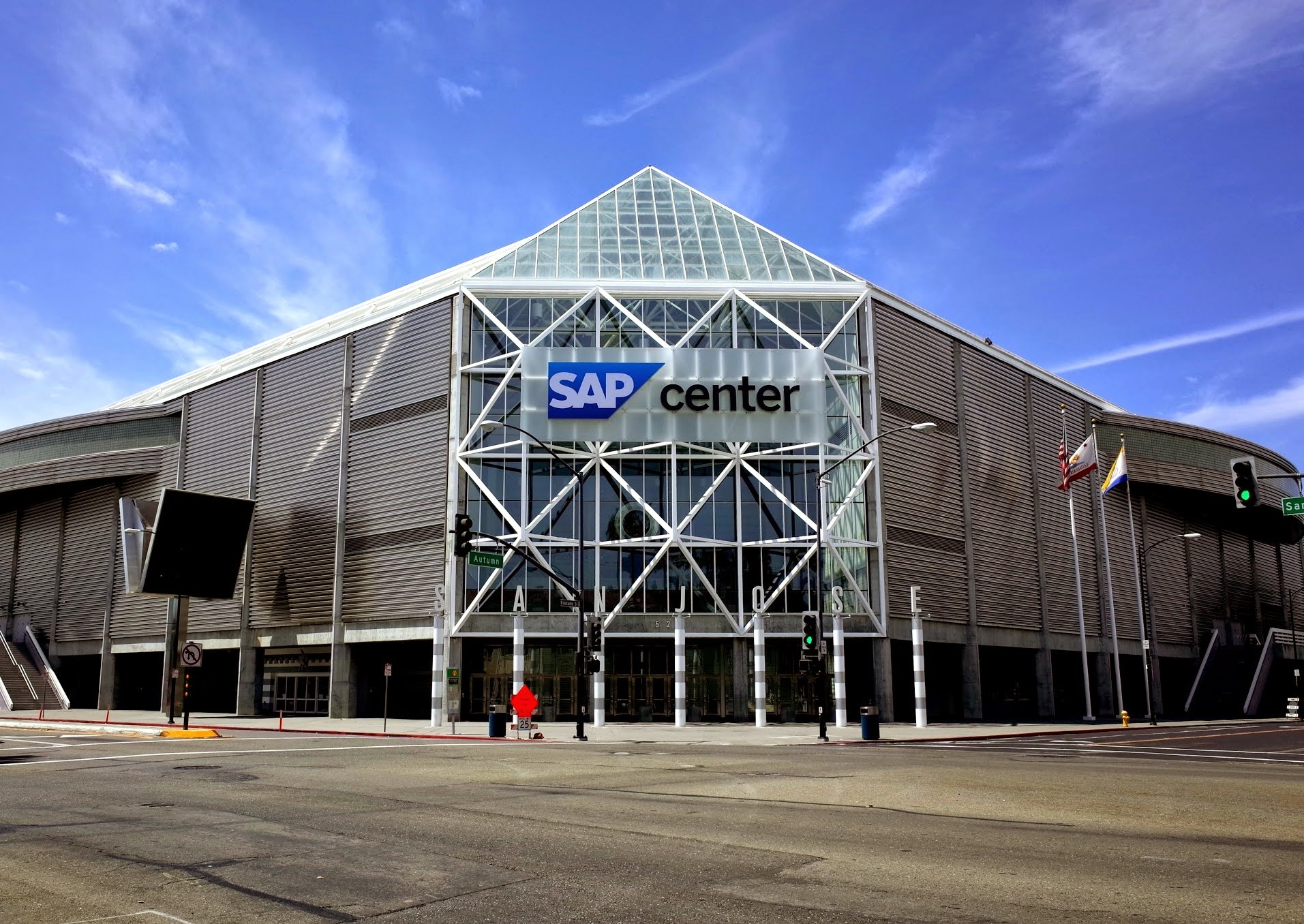
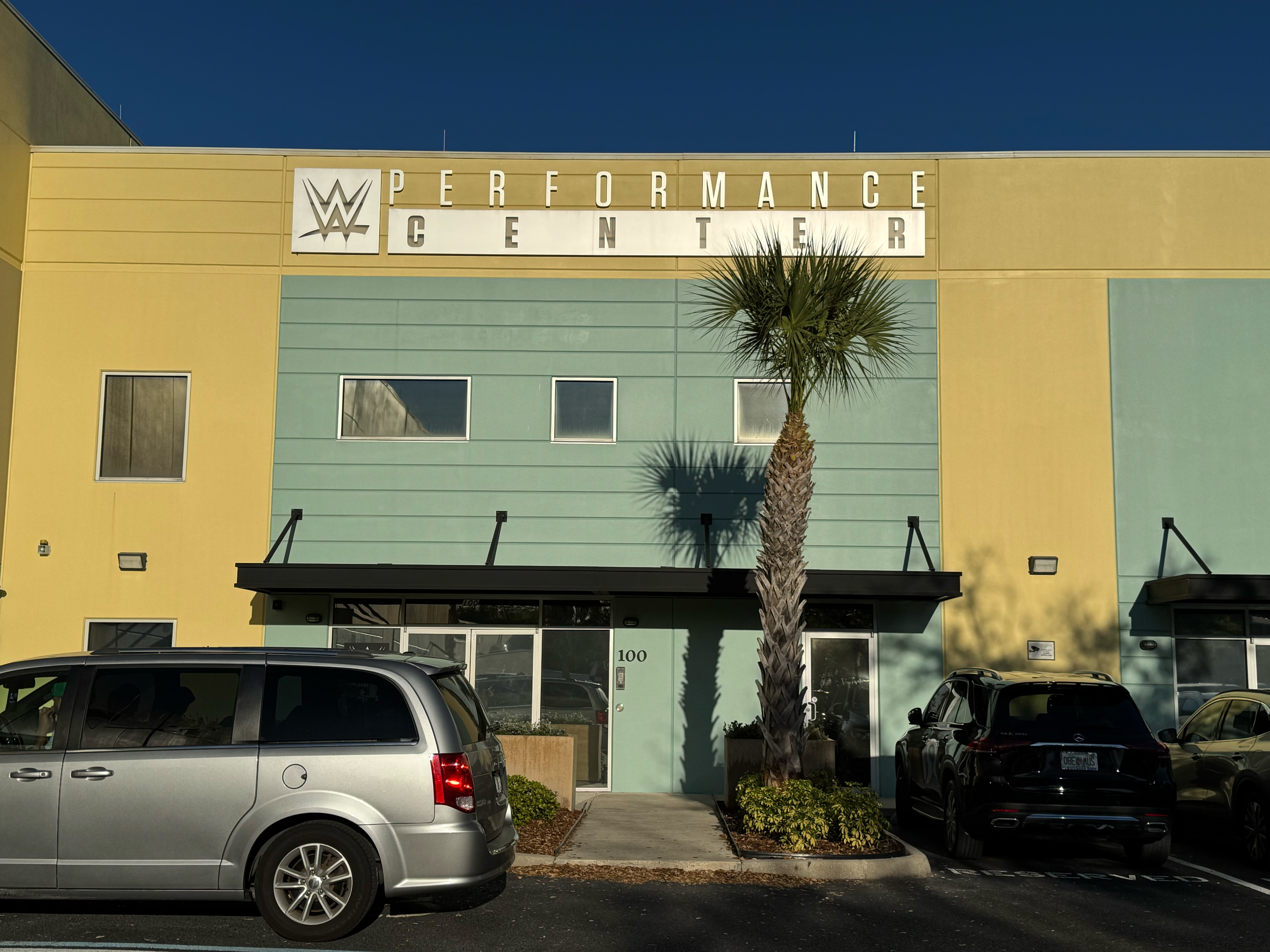
The 12th annual Extreme Rules event was originally scheduled to be held at the SAP Center in San Jose, California, but due to the COVID-19 pandemic, the event was moved to the WWE Performance Center in Orlando, Florida.

=== Background ===
Extreme Rules was an annual professional wrestling event produced by WWE since 2009. It was originally broadcast exclusively via pay-per-view (PPV) before it began simultaneously livestreaming on the WWE Network in 2014. The concept of the event was that it featured various matches that were contested under hardcore rules and generally featured one Extreme Rules match. The defunct Extreme Championship Wrestling promotion, which WWE acquired in 2003, originally used the "extreme rules" term to describe the regulations for all of its matches; WWE adopted the term, using it in place of "hardcore match" or "hardcore rules". The 2020 event was the 12th Extreme Rules and featured wrestlers from the Raw and SmackDown brand divisions. It was the only edition to have an altered title; while originally announced under its normal title, the event was renamed to "Extreme Rules: The Horror Show" in late June, before it was later changed to "The Horror Show at Extreme Rules" early the following month.

==== Impact of the COVID-19 pandemic ====
As a result of the COVID-19 pandemic, WWE began presenting the majority of its programming for Raw and SmackDown from a behind closed doors set at the WWE Performance Center in Orlando, Florida since mid-March, although in late May, the promotion began using Performance Center trainees to serve as the live audience, which was further expanded to friends and family members of the wrestlers in mid-June.

On February 7, 2020, Extreme Rules was originally scheduled to take place on July 19 from the SAP Center in San Jose, California. However, on March 17, Santa Clara County issued an indefinite stay-at-home order, followed by the entire state of California on March 19. The SAP Center then put out an official statement in late June that they would not be hosting the 2020 Extreme Rules, but would instead host the 2021 event. The venue also announced that there would be no refunds (unless a new date was not determined within 60 days), but tickets purchased would be honored for the following 2021 event. However, on July 9, 2021, WWE announced that the 2021 event would take place on September 26 and would instead be held at the Nationwide Arena in Columbus, Ohio, which was the originally scheduled date and venue for that year's Clash of Champions.

The pandemic provided WWE opportunities to create untraditional matches produced as cinematic matches filmed at various locations. For Extreme Rules, that match was the Wyatt Swamp Fight. The match was pre-recorded at an undisclosed location about two hours outside of Orlando. Filming lasted approximately 6–7 hours and began late evening of July 16 and finished early morning of July 17. Live reptiles were used, including an alligator and a snake. Multiple takes were done to get multiple camera angles, similar to a movie.

=== Storylines ===
The event comprised seven matches, including one on the Kickoff pre-show, that resulted from scripted storylines. Results were predetermined by WWE's writers on the Raw and SmackDown brands, while storylines were produced on WWE's weekly television shows, Monday Night Raw and Friday Night SmackDown.

At Money in the Bank, Braun Strowman retained the Universal Championship against Bray Wyatt. Wyatt returned on the June 19 episode of SmackDown in a Firefly Fun House segment that was interrupted by Strowman, who declared that Wyatt had his chance at Money in the Bank but failed. Wyatt stated their rivalry was just getting started before appearing as his old cult leader persona of The Wyatt Family. Wyatt said they needed to take a step back before they could move forward and stated that since he created Strowman, it was his job to destroy him. The following week, Strowman recounted how he initially joined Wyatt, reciting a story about their time at Wyatt's compound in the Florida swamps. Strowman then challenged Wyatt to return to the swamp for a fight, and a non-title match between the two called the Wyatt Swamp Fight was scheduled for Extreme Rules.

After being drafted to Raw from NXT in the 2018 WWE Superstar Shake-up, Drew McIntyre aligned himself with Dolph Ziggler. Although the team saw success in winning the Raw Tag Team Championship, they eventually broke up. Ziggler was moved to SmackDown the following year, while McIntyre remained on Raw and won the WWE Championship at WrestleMania 36 Part 2 in early 2020. On the June 22 episode of Raw, McIntyre was interrupted by Ziggler, who was traded to Raw. Ziggler brought up their history together, claiming credit for McIntyre's success, and stated that McIntyre owed him a title match. McIntyre, noting that he needed an opponent for Extreme Rules, reminded Ziggler that it was he who gave him the nickname the "Scottish Psychopath" and asked if Ziggler still wanted a title match and Ziggler confirmed. During the contract signing the following week, McIntyre told Ziggler that he could choose the stipulation for the match. Ziggler opted to wait until the event itself to reveal the stipulation.

On the June 22 episode of Raw, after successfully retaining the WWE Women's Tag Team Championship, co-champion Sasha Banks issued a challenge to Asuka for the Raw Women's Championship, which Asuka accepted for Extreme Rules. Though Banks was a SmackDown wrestler, she and partner Bayley could appear on any brand as the Women's Tag Team Champions.

On the June 19 episode of SmackDown, Nikki Cross attacked WWE Women's Tag Team Champions Bayley and Sasha Banks, leading to a match between Cross and Banks that Cross lost. The following week, Cross won a fatal four-way match to earn a SmackDown Women's Championship match against Bayley at Extreme Rules.

On the May 11 episode of Raw, Rey Mysterio and Aleister Black defeated Seth Rollins and Murphy by disqualification. After the match, an enraged Rollins used the corner of the steel steps to pierce Mysterio's eye, taking Mysterio out of action. During this time, Mysterio's son, Dominik, attempted to stand up to Rollins against Mysterio's wishes. On the June 22 episode, Rollins attempted to pierce Dominik's eye, but was unsuccessful. Mysterio then challenged Rollins to a match at Extreme Rules. On the July 6 episode, Mysterio and Kevin Owens defeated Rollins and Murphy in a tag team match, allowing Mysterio to pick the stipulation for their match at Extreme Rules; Mysterio chose an Eye for an Eye match. WWE later confirmed that in order to win the match, one competitor had to extract an eye of their opponent. Owens would continue his own feud with Murphy and on the day of the event, they were scheduled for a match on the Kickoff pre-show.

On the June 15 episode of Raw, MVP approached United States Champion Apollo Crews and told him that he needed a manager if he wanted to continue his title reign, but Crews declined the offer. The following week, MVP again tried to convince Crews to join, but Crews again declined. MVP then defeated Crews in a non-title match on the June 29 episode. After the match, Crews attacked MVP, who was saved by Bobby Lashley, who brutally applied the Full Nelson on Crews. The following week, MVP unveiled a new United States Championship belt design and stated that he would face Crews for the title at Extreme Rules.

On the June 12 episode of SmackDown, Cesaro and Shinsuke Nakamura defeated SmackDown Tag Team Champions The New Day (Big E and Kofi Kingston) in a non-title match. The following week after The New Day's match, they were attacked by Cesaro and Nakamura. On the July 3 episode following Nakamura's win over Kingston, Cesaro tried to pull out a table, but was stopped by Big E. The following week, a title match between the two teams took place, which ended in a no-contest, after which, Cesaro powerbombed Kingston onto Big E and through a table. On the July 17 episode, a title rematch between the two teams was scheduled for Extreme Rules. Also on that episode, Cesaro defeated Big E to pick the stipulation for the match, and chose a tables match.

== Event ==
Other on-screen personnel
| Role: | Name: |
|---|---|
| English commentators | Michael Cole (SmackDown) |
| English commentators | Corey Graves (SmackDown) |
| English commentators | Tom Phillips (Raw) |
| English commentators | Samoa Joe (Raw) |
| English commentators | Byron Saxton (Raw) |
| Spanish commentator | Marcelo Rodriguez |
| Ring announcers | Greg Hamilton (SmackDown) |
| Ring announcers | Mike Rome (Raw) |
| Referees | Jessika Carr |
| Referees | John Cone |
| Referees | Dan Engler |
| Referees | Eddie Orengo |
| Referees | Chad Patton |
| Referees | Charles Robinson |
| Referees | Rod Zapata |
| Interviewers | Charly Caruso |
| Interviewers | Kayla Braxton |
| Pre-show panel | Scott Stanford |
| Pre-show panel | Peter Rosenberg |
| Pre-show correspondents | Renee Young |
| Pre-show correspondents | Booker T |
| Pre-show correspondents | John "Bradshaw" Layfield |

=== Pre-show ===
During the Extreme Rules Kickoff pre-show, Kevin Owens faced Murphy. In the climax, Owens performed a Stunner on Murphy to win the match.

=== Preliminary matches ===
The actual pay-per-view opened with The New Day (Big E and Kofi Kingston) defending the SmackDown Tag Team Championship against Cesaro and Shinsuke Nakamura in a tables match. In the end, Cesaro performed a Powerbomb on Kingston through two tables stacked on top of each other to win the titles for the first time as a team and second for Cesaro individually.

Next, Bayley (accompanied by Sasha Banks) defended the SmackDown Women's Championship against Nikki Cross (accompanied by Alexa Bliss). Cross dominated Bayley in the first half of the match. Bayley performed a Bayley-to-Belly on Cross for a nearfall. The end came when Banks handed her "boss" brass knuckles to Bayley. While Banks distracted the referee, Bayley attacked Cross with the knuckles and performed a facebuster on Cross to retain the title.

After that, Apollo Crews was originally set to defend the United States Championship against MVP (accompanied by Bobby Lashley), however, the commentary team stated that Crews was unable to compete after failing a pre-match physical due to Lashley's previous attack on Crews. MVP made his entrance, and declared himself the winner by forfeit. Lashley then presented MVP with the United States Championship. This title change, however, was not recognized by WWE.

In the next match, Rey Mysterio faced Seth Rollins in an Eye for an Eye match where the only way to win was to extract an opponent's eye. Rollins wielded a pair of pliers while making his entrance. As Rollins waited for Mysterio to make his entrance, Mysterio appeared behind Rollins and attacked him. During the match, Rollins attempted to injure Mysterio's left eye using various weapons, such as the corner of the steel steps, a kendo stick, the point of a steel chair, and a pen. Rollins wedged a kendo stick on a turnbuckle and attempted to injure Mysterio's eye again, however, Mysterio countered and performed a frog splash on Rollins. Mysterio used a kendo stick to injure Rollins' eyes and performed a 619 on him. Mysterio tried to injure Rollins' eye with the corner of the steel steps (just as Rollins had previously injured Mysterio's eye), however, Rollins performed a low blow on Mysterio. Rollins then performed The Stomp on Mysterio and again pierced Mysterio's already injured eye on the corner of the steel steps, causing Mysterio's eye to pop out, thus giving the win to Rollins. Following the match, medical personnel tended to Mysterio while Rollins vomited at ringside.

Next, Asuka (accompanied by Kairi Sane) defended the Raw Women's Championship against Sasha Banks (accompanied by Bayley). In the climax, Asuka attempted to spit green mist on Banks, however, Banks avoided the mist and Asuka inadvertently spat mist on the referee's face. As Asuka applied the Asuka Lock on Banks, Bayley attacked Asuka with a Women's Tag Team Championship belt. Bayley then removed the shirt off the referee, put it on and counted the pin for Banks to "win". WWE, however, declared the match a no-contest, and therefore Asuka retained the championship, however, Banks took the physical belt.

Backstage, interviewer Charly Caruso gave a medical update on Rey Mysterio. She said that if the damage to his eye was minimal, it would heal and he would regain his vision.

In the final match from the Performance Center, Drew McIntyre defended the WWE Championship against Dolph Ziggler. After making their respective entrances, Ziggler revealed the stipulation that he had chosen: an Extreme Rules match where the stipulation only applied to him while McIntyre had to wrestle under normal singles match rules, with the additional stipulation that if McIntyre was disqualified or counted out, he would lose the title. During the match, Ziggler used multiple weapons throughout the match, taking advantage of the one-sided rules. In the end, McIntyre countered a Superkick into a Claymore Kick on Ziggler to retain the title.

=== Main event ===
In the main event, Universal Champion Braun Strowman faced Bray Wyatt in a non-title Wyatt Swamp Fight. At the swamp, Wyatt sat in his old rocking chair waiting for Strowman to arrive. After arriving in a vehicle, Strowman walked towards Wyatt, however, it suddenly went dark and Wyatt vanished, after which, an enraged Strowman obliterated the rocking chair. In search of Wyatt, Strowman fought off a couple of masked men, however, another attacked Strowman with a spade, who was revealed as Strowman's own doppelganger of his past self from The Wyatt Family. The doppelganger attacked Strowman again with the spade, knocking him unconscious. After regaining consciousness, Strowman found himself chained to a chair in a house adorned with Wyatt's eerie dolls. Wyatt then approached Strowman to his old theme music, carrying his lantern, and welcomed Strowman home. Wyatt spoke about how he created Strowman and that he would destroy him to make him anew. He also stated that his old self had been trapped inside his mind thanks to his alter ego "The Fiend". A female figure with a black veil then appeared with a snake that bit Strowman, rendering him unconscious.

Sometime later, Strowman awoke in a field where he was attacked by another man whom Strowman set ablaze. The female figure appeared again and unveiled herself as an illusion of Alexa Bliss, Strowman's old tag team partner from Season 1 of Mixed Match Challenge. The illusion implied Strowman's love interest for her and implored him to come home. Wyatt appeared once again and the two fought onto a dock until Strowman performed a chokeslam on Wyatt into a boat that sailed off into the darkness. Thinking that the fight was over, Strowman began to depart only for the boat to return. Strowman went to investigate, but found it empty. Wyatt then suddenly emerged from the swampy water and attacked Strowman with an oar before attempting to drown him. As Wyatt again disappeared, Strowman emerged from the water, gasping for air, and made his way back onto the dock. Wyatt appeared once again and attacked Strowman further. After attacking Strowman with a kendo stick, Wyatt spoke reluctantly about what he had just done to Strowman, who rose to his feet and kicked Wyatt through a barricade into the swampy water. Strowman surveyed the water and after seeing no signs of Wyatt, he declared it was over. However, Wyatt suddenly emerged from the water and used the Mandible Claw to pull Strowman into the water, not to be seen again. Wyatt attempted to come out of the water but was pulled back in. The water then turned red and began to bubble. Wyatt's alter ego "The Fiend" then peered over the dock, laughing manically before proclaiming "Let Me In" as the screen went to black to end the show.

== Reception ==
Kevin Pantoja of 411Mania reviewed the event and gave it a 7.0 out of 10, saying: "I didn't like the Swamp gimmick but everything else was good or at the very least, solid. There were some issues with finishes (namely Sasha/Asuka and Seth/Rey) but the whole show was an easy, entertaining watch." Erik Beaston of Bleacher Report gave high praise to the Wyatt Swamp Fight for Wyatt's creativity and the storytelling involving Strowman, called the WWE Championship bout "a solid, smartly wrestled match" that delivered Ziggler's "best performance in years", felt the storytelling in the SmackDown Women's title match had "a few clever callbacks" and commended both the Kickoff Show and the SmackDown Tag Title Tables match. Beaston was critical of the "uneven psychology" and Rollins' post-match reaction in the Eye for an Eye match and felt the "convoluted finish" to the Raw Women's Championship bout diminished the "overall quality of a contest that was heading toward Match of the Year candidacy."

== Aftermath ==
This was the final Extreme Rules to livestream on the American version of the WWE Network, which merged under Peacock in April 2021.

=== Raw ===
On the following Raw, Seth Rollins prided himself in defeating Rey Mysterio and blamed the fans for his horrendous actions before Aleister Black interrupted. Black condemned Rollins for the events of the past few weeks, leading to a match between the two which Rollins won, capitalizing on Black's injured arm. After the match, Rollins and his disciple Murphy continued their assault on Black, continuing to target his injured arm. For what Rollins did to his father, Mysterio's son Dominik challenged Rollins to a match at SummerSlam, which Rollins accepted after he and Murphy were attacked by Dominik with a kendo stick on the August 3 episode. Their match was made a Street Fight.

Following his unrecognized forfeit win over Apollo Crews, The Hurt Business (MVP, Bobby Lashley, and new faction member Shelton Benjamin, who had just won the 24/7 Championship from R-Truth), challenged Ricochet and Cedric Alexander to a 3-on-2 handicap match due to them not having a third partner, who would have been Crews. Alexander and Ricochet revealed that they did have a partner, the returning Mustafa Ali, who was traded from SmackDown. The newly-formed trio then defeated MVP, Lashley, and Benjamin in the ensuing six-man tag team match. Crews, sporting the older United States Championship belt, returned on the August 3 episode and he and MVP formally had their title match where Crews retained. Crews later said he would give the old belt to his kids while he kept the new belt MVP introduced. MVP then demanded a rematch for SummerSlam, and Crews accepted.

WWE Champion Drew McIntyre cut a promo on his win over Dolph Ziggler, who interrupted and demanded another title opportunity to which McIntyre initially denied. Ziggler tried to cheap shot McIntyre only for McIntyre to perform a Glasgow Kiss on Ziggler. A weakened Ziggler continued his plea, allowing McIntyre to choose the time, place, as well as the stipulation for the title match, which intrigued McIntyre enough to accept the challenge. McIntyre then said that he needed time to decide on a stipulation and that he would reveal the stipulation just prior to the match, just as Ziggler had done at Extreme Rules. The rematch occurred the following week, but for unexplained reasons as a non-title match. Backstage, Ziggler cut a promo stating that if he defeated McIntyre, he would face him for the title at SummerSlam, however, McIntyre, who chose an Extreme Rules match as the stipulation, defeated Ziggler once again. Randy Orton, who earlier that night issued a challenge for the title at SummerSlam that McIntyre accepted, performed an RKO from behind and stood over McIntyre while hoisting the title.

While Sasha Banks and Bayley were celebrating Banks' unofficial title win over Asuka for the Raw Women's Championship, they were interrupted by Asuka, who claimed that Banks did not win. WWE Chief Brand Officer Stephanie McMahon then appeared on the TitanTron and stated that Banks nor Asuka won at Extreme Rules and then announced a rematch between the two for the Raw Women's Championship for the following week in a match where the title could be won by pinfall, submission, disqualification, or count out. In the ensuing match, Bayley attacked Asuka's tag team partner, Kairi Sane, backstage. This distracted Asuka, who went to check on Sane and was counted out, thus Banks officially won the Raw Women's Championship for a record fifth time. Asuka then defeated Bayley to earn a rematch against Banks at SummerSlam, while Asuka also won a triple brand battle royal, featuring wrestlers from Raw, SmackDown, and NXT on the August 14 episode of SmackDown to also face Bayley for her SmackDown Women's Championship at the event.

=== SmackDown ===
On the following SmackDown, Kofi Kingston was evaluated backstage by medical personnel and informed Big E that he was injured and would be out for at least 6–8 weeks. He then encouraged Big E to pursue a solo run, which he said himself and other injured teammate Xavier Woods fully supported. The two embraced afterwards. On the October 9 episode, Woods and Kingston defeated Cesaro and Shinsuke Nakamura to reclaim the SmackDown Tag Team Championship, but were drafted to Raw while Big E remained on SmackDown.

Also on the following SmackDown and despite what Stephanie McMahon had stated on the previous episode of Raw, Bayley and Sasha Banks continued celebrating as if they held all the women's championships for Raw and SmackDown, and labeled themselves as the definition of "greatness" (this occurring before Banks officially won the Raw Women's Championship on the next Raw). An irate Nikki Cross, accompanied by her tag team partner Alexa Bliss, demanded a rematch for the SmackDown Women's Championship. Bayley agreed to the rematch, however, she stated that Cross must defeat a worthy adversary in Bliss, setting up a match between Bliss and Cross where the winner would face Bayley for the title on the following week's SmackDown. Cross defeated Bliss to earn a rematch, but was again unsuccessful in winning the title from Bayley. Following the match, Bliss tried to console Cross, who shoved her away.

Bray Wyatt appeared in the Firefly Fun House and stated that his old Eater of Worlds self was done for now and assured that Braun Strowman had come back home, thus "reuniting" with his family. He then declared that The Fiend had been unleashed. The following week, Wyatt, who stated that Strowman was still lost somewhere at the swamp, issued a warning to Strowman, stating that The Fiend wanted the Universal Championship and that no one was safe until he got it. The Fiend then made his first TV appearance in nearly four months and taunted Strowman by attacking his old Mixed Match Challenge tag team partner Alexa Bliss with the Mandible Claw. The Fiend attempted to attack Bliss again the following week, however, Bliss showed affection to The Fiend, who backed off. Strowman then appeared on the TitanTron, stated he did not care for Bliss, and that the swamp fight had made him into a monster. Strowman then accepted The Fiend's challenge for the Universal Championship at SummerSlam. The following week, Strowman, now sporting a bald look, attacked Bliss. The title match was later stipulated as a Falls Count Anywhere match.

=== Future events during the pandemic ===
On August 17, it was announced that all future episodes of Raw and SmackDown and all PPV and livestreaming events for the respective brands would be held at Orlando's Amway Center until further notice, beginning with the August 21 episode of SmackDown. The move also brought a new virtual fan viewing experience in a bio-secure bubble called the WWE ThunderDome. This effectively made The Horror Show at Extreme Rules the final PPV and livestreaming event for Raw and SmackDown to be held at the Performance Center during the COVID-19 pandemic; NXT's events would later be moved to the Performance Center in October in its own version of the ThunderDome called the Capitol Wrestling Center, with NXT TakeOver events also becoming available on pay-per-view starting with NXT TakeOver 31.

== Results ==
| No. | Results | Stipulations | Times |
|---|---|---|---|
| 1^{P} | Kevin Owens defeated Murphy by pinfall | Singles match | 8:55 |
| 2 | Cesaro and Shinsuke Nakamura defeated The New Day (Big E and Kofi Kingston) (c) by putting Kingston through a table | Tables match for the WWE SmackDown Tag Team Championship | 10:25 |
| 3 | Bayley (c) (with Sasha Banks) defeated Nikki Cross (with Alexa Bliss) by pinfall | Singles match for the WWE SmackDown Women's Championship | 12:20 |
| 4 | Seth Rollins defeated Rey Mysterio | Eye for an Eye match The match could only be won when one competitor extracted an eye of their opponent. | 18:05 |
| 5 | Asuka (c) (with Kairi Sane) vs. Sasha Banks (with Bayley) ended in a no contest | Singles match for the WWE Raw Women's Championship | 20:00 |
| 6 | Drew McIntyre (c) defeated Dolph Ziggler by pinfall | Extreme Rules match for the WWE Championship; The Extreme Rules stipulation only applied to Ziggler; McIntyre had to wrestle under normal singles match rules. Additionally, had McIntyre been counted out or disqualified, he would have lost the title. | 15:25 |
| 7 | Bray Wyatt defeated Braun Strowman | Wyatt Swamp Fight | 18:00 |
(c) / – the champion(s) heading into the match; P / – the match was broadcast on the pre-show
