= NXT TakeOver XXX =

2020 WWE Network event

- Promotional poster featuring various NXT wrestlers
- Promotion: WWE
- Brand: NXT
- Date: August 22, 2020
- City: Winter Park, Florida
- Venue: Full Sail University
- Attendance: 0 (behind closed doors) (Note: The event was held without a paying audience due to the COVID-19 pandemic in the United States, though it featured a live crowd of WWE wrestlers and trainees.)

WWE event chronology
← Previous; The Horror Show at Extreme Rules	Next → SummerSlam

NXT TakeOver chronology
← Previous; In Your House	Next → 31

NXT TakeOver XXX was a 2020 professional wrestling livestreaming event produced by WWE, held exclusively for wrestlers from the promotion's NXT brand division. It was the 30th NXT TakeOver event and took place on August 22, 2020, at NXT's home venue at the time, Full Sail University in Winter Park, Florida. It was held as part of that year's SummerSlam weekend and was the final TakeOver event to air exclusively on the WWE Network, as beginning with TakeOver 31 in October, the events also became available on traditional pay-per-view.

The event was originally titled as NXT TakeOver: Boston as it was planned to take place at the TD Garden in Boston, Massachusetts, but due to the COVID-19 pandemic, the city's Mayor Marty Walsh announced the suspension of all large-scale gatherings and that no permit would be issued for an event that could draw a large crowd before September 7. As such, the event was moved to Full Sail University and renamed. It would in turn be NXT's final livestreaming event to be held at Full Sail, as beginning with TakeOver 31 in October, NXT's events were moved to the WWE Performance Center in Orlando, Florida and broadcast from a bio-secure bubble called the Capitol Wrestling Center, with the Performance Center becoming the brand's permanent home.

Six matches were contested at the event, including one on the pre-show. In the main event, Karrion Kross defeated Keith Lee to win the NXT Championship. In the penultimate match, Io Shirai defeated Dakota Kai to retain the NXT Women's Championship. In other prominent matches, Damian Priest won the vacant NXT North American Championship in a ladder match, and Adam Cole defeated Pat McAfee, which was McAfee's WWE in-ring debut.

== Production ==
=== Background ===
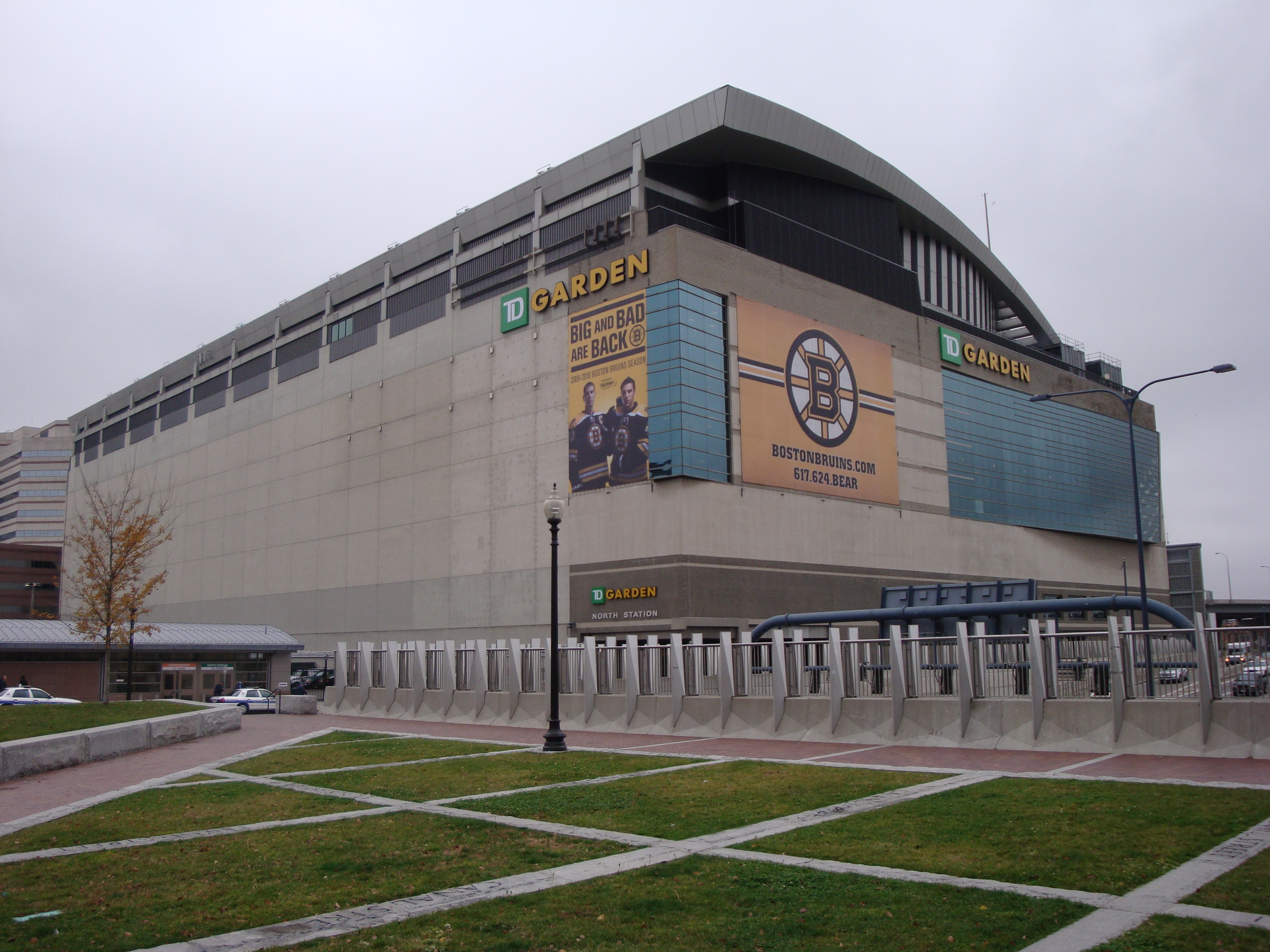
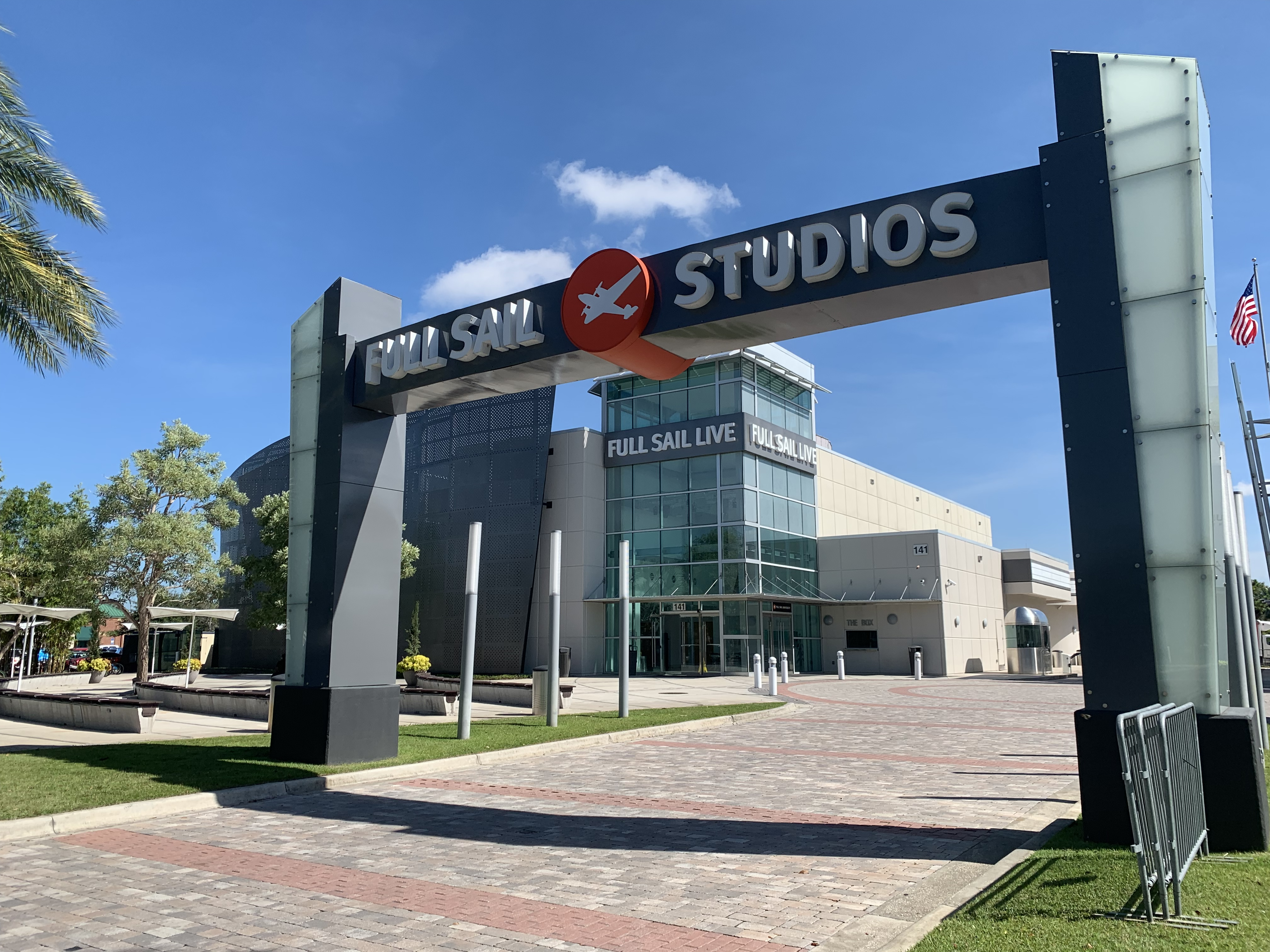
The 30th NXT TakeOver event was originally scheduled to be held at the TD Garden in Boston, Massachusetts, but due to the COVID-19 pandemic, it was instead held at NXT's home venue at the time, Full Sail University in Winter Park, Florida. This would be the brand's final livestreaming event at the venue as NXT moved to the WWE Performance Center in Orlando in October, which became its permanent home venue.

TakeOver was a series of professional wrestling events that began in May 2014, as WWE's NXT brand held its second WWE Network-exclusive livestreaming event, billed as TakeOver. The "TakeOver" moniker subsequently became the branding for all of NXT's major events held periodically throughout the year. Titled for being the 30th TakeOver event, TakeOver XXX was held on August 22, 2020, as a support show for that year's SummerSlam pay-per-view.

==== Impact of the COVID-19 pandemic ====
As a result of the COVID-19 pandemic that began affecting the industry in mid-March, WWE had to present the majority of its programming from a behind closed doors set. NXT's programming was subsequently held at NXT's home venue at the time, Full Sail University in Winter Park, Florida. Announced on August 8, 2019, this TakeOver event, as well as the following night's SummerSlam, were originally scheduled to take place at the TD Garden in Boston, Massachusetts. However, on May 8, 2020, Boston mayor Marty Walsh suspended all large-scale gatherings until September 7, effectively canceling WWE's planned events in the city. As a result, this TakeOver, which was originally titled "TakeOver: Boston", was also moved to Full Sail University and subsequently renamed to "TakeOver XXX" due to it being the 30th TakeOver event.

=== Storylines ===
The event comprised six matches, including one on the Pre-Show. Results were predetermined by WWE's writers on the NXT brand, while storylines were produced on WWE's weekly television program, NXT.

On the July 22 episode of NXT, then double champion Keith Lee reflected on his career and all of the opportunities he had gotten and stated that he now wanted to pay it forward, so he voluntarily relinquished the NXT North American Championship to allow other wrestlers a chance at the title, while he would focus solely on defending the NXT Championship. As a result, NXT General Manager William Regal announced that there would be a series of triple threat matches set up as qualifiers for a five-man ladder match to be held at TakeOver XXX to crown a new North American Champion. That same night, Bronson Reed defeated Johnny Gargano and Roderick Strong to become the first to qualify for the match. The following week, Dexter Lumis joined Reed as the second person to qualify by defeating Finn Bálor and Timothy Thatcher, but was later ruled out due to an ankle injury. On the August 5 episode, Damian Priest joined Reed as the third person to qualify by defeating Oney Lorcan and NXT UK's Ridge Holland. Due to Lumis' injury, Regal announced two singles matches that would take place to fill Lumis' spot and determine the final two competitors. The wrestlers in those matches would be the ones who were neither pinned nor submitted in the triple threats. On the August 12 episode of NXT, Cameron Grimes joined Reed and Priest as the fourth person to qualify by defeating Kushida and the returning Velveteen Dream, the latter of whom turned heel after the match. The final two to qualify were Gargano and Dream, who defeated Holland and Bálor, respectively.

On the July 22 episode of NXT, during Karrion Kross's match, NXT Champion Keith Lee showed up and checked on Kross's opponent after Kross won. The following week, Kross challenged Lee for the NXT Championship, stating that Lee's friends would suffer, and Lee accepted. On the August 12 episode, after Kross won his match, Kross and Lee signed the contract for the title match at TakeOver XXX. After the two signed the contract, a fireball went out of the contract and into Lee.

On the July 15 episode of NXT, after Io Shirai's successful NXT Women's Championship defense, Dakota Kai attacked Shirai. On the August 5 episode of NXT, thanks to interference from The Robert Stone Brand's Mercedes Martinez, Kai defeated Rhea Ripley to earn an opportunity against Shirai at TakeOver XXX, after which, Martinez attacked Ripley.

On July 23, during Pat McAfee's radio program on CBS Sports Radio, Adam Cole got into an altercation with McAfee, due to McAfee accusing Cole of hiding behind The Undisputed Era during his record 403-day NXT Championship reign and mocking Cole for his smaller stature, resulting in Cole cussing out McAfee and shoving a producer. On July 27, NXT head Paul "Triple H" Levesque offered McAfee the opportunity to work things out with Cole on the August 5 episode of NXT. During the NXT Tag Team Championship match, which saw Imperium (Fabian Aichner and Marcel Barthel) defend against The Undisputed Era (Bobby Fish and Kyle O'Reilly), McAfee mocked Cole while serving as guest commentator and got into another altercation, which ended with McAfee punting Cole in the head while Cole was being restrained, before being thrown out of Full Sail University. The following day, Triple H issued a challenge to McAfee on Cole's behalf for a match at TakeOver XXX on ESPN's Get Up!, which McAfee later accepted in a video.

On the August 5 episode of NXT, Legado Del Fantasma (Joaquin Wilde and Raul Mendoza) ambushed Breezango (Fandango and Tyler Breeze) and threw them into their van. Later that night, they dragged Fandango out. Breeze tried to make the save, but was overpowered. The following week, Santos Escobar defeated Breeze, after which, Legado attacked Breezango until Isaiah "Swerve" Scott made the save. On the August 19 episode, Legado Del Fantasma defeated Scott and Breezango. Later that night, a triple threat tag team match between Oney Lorcan and Danny Burch, Legado Del Fantasma, and Breezango was scheduled for the Pre-Show to determine the number one contenders for Imperium's (Fabian Aichner and Marcel Barthel) NXT Tag Team Championship.

On August 20, a match between Timothy Thatcher and Finn Bálor was scheduled for TakeOver XXX.

== Event ==
Other on-screen personnel
Role:	Name:
Commentators	Vic Joseph
Commentators	Corey Graves
Commentators	Beth Phoenix
Spanish commentators	Carlos Cabrera
Spanish commentators	Marcelo Rodriguez
Interviewer	McKenzie Mitchell
Ring announcer	Alicia Taylor
Referees	Drake Wuertz
Referees	Darryl Sharma
Referees	D.A. Brewer
Referees	Tom Castor
Referees	Stephon Smith
Pre-show panel	Scott Stanford
Pre-show panel	Sam Roberts
Pre-show panel	Booker T

=== Pre-show ===
During the TakeOver XXX Pre-Show, Breezango (Fandango and Tyler Breeze), Oney Lorcan and Danny Burch, and Legado Del Fantasma (Joaquin Wilde and Raul Mendoza) faced each other in triple threat tag team match to determine the number one contenders for the NXT Tag Team Championship. In the end, Breeze performed a Super Model Kick on Lorcan to win the match.

=== Preliminary matches ===
The actual event began with Finn Bálor taking on Timothy Thatcher. The match in itself was a highly technical matchup and Thatcher and Balor used a lot of submissions. Bálor won following a Coup de Grace and a 1916.

Next, the vacant North American Championship was decided in a five-way ladder match featuring Bronson Reed, Damian Priest, Cameron Grimes, Johnny Gargano, and The Velveteen Dream as the participants. Midway through the match, Reed performed a suicide dive onto Grimes, Gargano, and Priest, prompting Gargano's wife, Candice LeRae, to come out and check on her husband. Grimes was taken out of the match when Gargano used a powerbomb on him from a ladder onto another ladder. Dream was thrown out into the audience on the concrete floor. LeRae would become more heavily involved in the match by preventing Grimes from grabbing the title. She also tried to stop Reed from grabbing the title as well, but suffered greatly once Reed jumped from the ladder with LeRae on his back, splashing Gargano. In the end, Priest shoved Gargano off the ladder and unhooked the belt to win the title.

Following this was the grudge match between Adam Cole and Pat McAfee. Things started off intense after McAfee dove to the outside, taking out Cole and the rest of The Undisputed Era, his own posse of NFL teammates, and several WWE officials and security. McAfee's advantage would dissipate over time after Cole locked him in a Figure four Leglock. McAfee would escape and hit his signature punt on Cole for a near fall. McAfee would counter a superplex attempt by Cole by flipping out and landing on his feet. McAfee also performed a suicide dive from the top turnbuckle onto the Undisputed Era and other officials on the outside. However, in the end, it would be Cole who would pick up the victory following a Panama Sunrise.

In the penultimate match, Io Shirai defended the NXT Women's Championship against Dakota Kai. Kai started the match off strong with several kicks and lariats. Once Shirai started mounting offense, Kai escaped to the outside where her enforcer, Raquel González, stopped Shirai in her tracks, long enough for Kai to attack her from behind. Kai continued her advantage by targeting the arm of Shirai and hitting her with the Kairopractor for a nearfall. Kai would then accidentally kick the ref, knocking him unconscious. Shirai capitalized with her patented Over-the-Moonsault, but was attacked by Gonzalez, who laid Shirai out with a Pumphandle Uranage. Kai capitalized and covered Shirai as the ref came to and started the count, only for Shirai to kick out at a two count. Moments later, Shirai performed a Moonsault on both González and Kai outside the ring. Following this, Shirai performed another Moonsault on Kai to retain the title. Afterwards, Shirai was attacked by González, but was rescued by Rhea Ripley.

=== Main event ===
In the main event, Keith Lee defended the NXT Championship against Karrion Kross (accompanied by Scarlett). Soon after the bell rang, the fight was quickly taken to the outside, with Kross kicking Lee's arm in between the guard rail and plexiglass divider. Kross continued to wear Lee down with various submission holds, and even hit a Doomsday Saito for a near fall. Lee would eventually mount a comeback against Kross, countering an arm bar by lifting it into a powerbomb, and would nail Kross with the Spirit Bomb for a near fall. Kross would mount a comeback by trapping Lee in the Kross Jacket and nearly made the champion pass out, but Lee would stay conscious and fight out of the hold. Lee attempted to go for a top rope maneuver, but would be met by Kross, who performed a top rope Doomsday Saito to pin Lee and win the NXT Championship for the first time in his career.

== Reception ==
Dave Meltzer rated the NXT North American Championship Ladder Match 4.5 stars, the highest of the night. The main event however, received 2 stars, the lowest of the night. The rest of the card received the following ratings. The kick-off show match received 3 stars, Finn Balor vs. Timothy Thatcher received 4 stars, and the NXT Women's Championship match and Adam Cole vs. Pat McAfee match both received 3.75 stars.

== Aftermath ==
After the event ended, it was reported by WWE that Karrion Kross had suffered a separated shoulder during his main event match with Keith Lee. At SummerSlam, it was announced that Lee would be moving to the Raw brand. On the following episode of NXT, Kross announced that due to suffering that shoulder injury, he would not be medically cleared to defend the NXT Championship and thus relinquished the belt. As a result, Regal announced later that night that four former champions—Johnny Gargano, Finn Bálor, Adam Cole, and the returning Tommaso Ciampa—would compete on the September 1 "Super Tuesday" edition of NXT in a four-way 60-minute Iron Man match for the vacant NXT Championship.

Also on NXT, Breezango (Tyler Breeze and Fandango) defeated Imperium (Fabian Aichner and Marcel Barthel) to become the new NXT Tag Team Champions, their first titles in WWE.

Dakota Kai and Raquel González took on Rhea Ripley and Io Shirai and defeated them after interference from Mercedes Martinez. This would lead to a Steel Cage match between Ripley and Martinez at Night 2 of NXT Super Tuesday, where Ripley was victorious.

Pat McAfee returned on the October 21 episode of NXT, where he interfered in a match between Breezango (Tyler Breeze and Fandango) against Danny Burch and Oney Lorcan for the NXT Tag Team Championship, with the latter being a replacement team for The Undisputed Era. McAfee helped Burch and Lorcan win the titles, after which, McAfee aligned with Burch and Lorcan. At NXT: Halloween Havoc the following week, McAfee stated that this was part of a feud between him and The Undisputed Era, and also revealed that he hired Ridge Holland to attack to take out Adam Cole at TakeOver: 31. After Holland's legitimate injuries during a match against Burch, McAfee hired him and Lorcan to take out Bobby Fish and Roderick Strong, which gave O'Reilly no choice but to hand them The Undisputed Era's title shot. O'Reilly came from the back and was joined by Pete Dunne, however, Dunne turned on O'Reilly and joined McAfee's stable, calling themselves The Kings of NXT. On the November 18 episode, McAfee interrupted NXT Champion Finn Bálor mid-promo, and following The Undisputed Era's return, they brawled with Burch, Lorcan, Dunne, and McAfee as the show ended. It was then confirmed that the two teams would face each other in a WarGames match at TakeOver: WarGames.

TakeOver XXX would be the final TakeOver to air exclusively on the WWE Network, as beginning with TakeOver 31 on October 4, 2020, the TakeOver events also became available on traditional pay-per-view. Additionally, TakeOver XXX was NXT's final livestreaming event to broadcast from Full Sail University, as also beginning with TakeOver 31, the events were moved to the WWE Performance Center in Orlando, Florida in a bio-secure bubble called the Capitol Wrestling Center, which was similar to the WWE ThunderDome that was utilized for Raw and SmackDown's events, with the Performance Center becoming NXT's permanent home venue.

== Results ==
No.	Results	Stipulations	Times
1^{P}	Breezango (Fandango and Tyler Breeze) defeated Oney Lorcan and Danny Burch and Legado del Fantasma (Joaquin Wilde and Raul Mendoza) by pinfall	Triple threat tag team match to determine the number one contenders for the NXT Tag Team Championship	6:52
2	Finn Bálor defeated Timothy Thatcher by pinfall	Singles match	13:32
3	Damian Priest defeated Bronson Reed, Cameron Grimes, Johnny Gargano, and Velveteen Dream	Ladder match for the vacant NXT North American Championship	21:24
4	Adam Cole defeated Pat McAfee by pinfall	Singles match	16:12
5	Io Shirai (c) defeated Dakota Kai (with Raquel González) by pinfall	Singles match for the NXT Women's Championship	17:13
6	Karrion Kross (with Scarlett) defeated Keith Lee (c) by pinfall	Singles match for the NXT Championship	21:51
(c) / – the champion(s) heading into the match; P / – the match was broadcast on the pre-show
