= TLC: Tables, Ladders & Chairs (2020) =

WWE pay-per-view and livestreaming event

- Promotional poster featuring Roman Reigns
- Promotion: WWE
- Brand(s): Raw; SmackDown
- Date: December 20, 2020
- City: St. Petersburg, Florida
- Venue: WWE ThunderDome at Tropicana Field
- Attendance: 0 (behind closed doors) (Note: The event was held without a paying audience due to the COVID-19 pandemic in the United States, though it featured a live crowd of virtual fans via WWE's ThunderDome viewing experience.)

WWE event chronology
← Previous; NXT TakeOver: WarGames	Next → Superstar Spectacle

TLC: Tables, Ladders & Chairs chronology
← Previous; 2019	Next → NXT TLC: Tables, Ladders & Chairs (2026)

The 2020 TLC: Tables, Ladders & Chairs was a professional wrestling pay-per-view (PPV) and livestreaming event produced by WWE, held for wrestlers from the promotion's main roster brands, Raw and SmackDown. It was the 12th annual TLC: Tables, Ladders & Chairs and took place on December 20, 2020, from the WWE ThunderDome, a bio-secure bubble that at the time was hosted at Tropicana Field in St. Petersburg, Florida. The concept of the show was based around the primary matches of the card each utilizing tables, ladders, and chairs as legal weapons.

The event was reportedly planned to be held at the Allstate Arena in the Chicago suburb of Rosemont, Illinois; however, due to the COVID-19 pandemic, it was moved to the ThunderDome at Tropicana Field. This was WWE's first PPV and livestreaming event to present the ThunderDome from Tropicana Field, following a four-month residency at Orlando's Amway Center. The 2020 event would in turn be the final TLC event for the main roster as the following year, it was canceled in favor of an event called Day 1; TLC was later reinstated in December 2026 as a premium live event (PLE) for WWE's developmental brand, NXT. As a result, this was the final TLC event to air on the WWE Network, which was completely shutdown in April 2026. This would also be the last main roster PPV and livestreaming event held in December until Wrestlepalooza in 2026.

Seven matches were contested at the event, including one on the Kickoff pre-show. In the main event, Randy Orton defeated The Fiend in a Firefly Inferno match. In the penultimate match, Roman Reigns defeated Kevin Owens in a Tables, Ladders, and Chairs (TLC) match to retain SmackDown's Universal Championship. In other prominent matches, Asuka and the returning Charlotte Flair defeated Nia Jax and Shayna Baszler to win the WWE Women's Tag Team Championship—subsequently making Flair WWE's fifth Women's Triple Crown Champion and fourth Women's Grand Slam Champion—and in the opening bout, Drew McIntyre defeated AJ Styles and The Miz in a triple threat TLC match to retain Raw's WWE Championship; The Miz cashed in his Money in the Bank contract during the scheduled match between McIntyre and Styles, although this cash-in was later nullified as Miz's tag team partner, John Morrison, cashed in the contract on behalf of Miz (only the contract holder can cash in the contract).

== Production ==
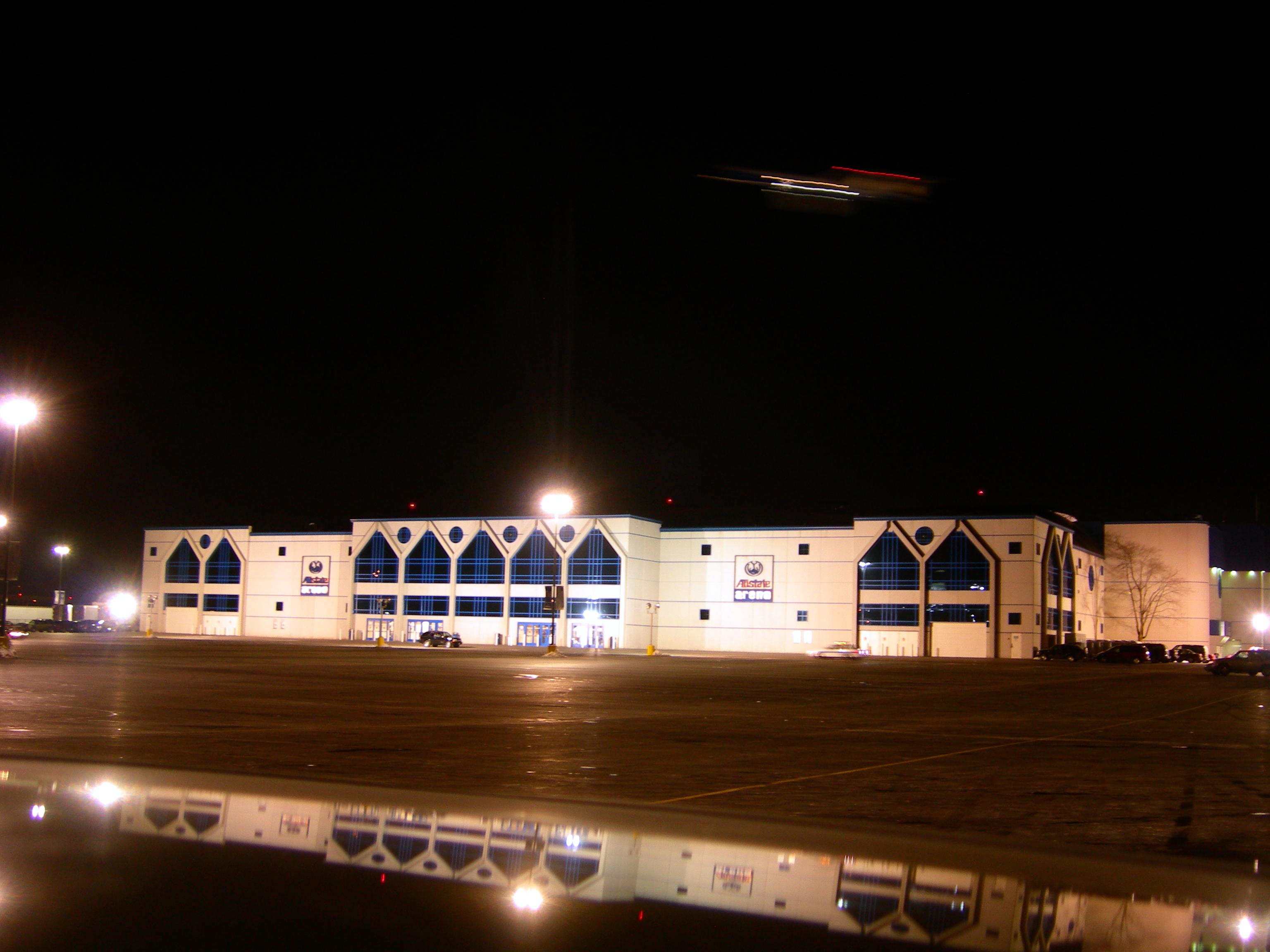
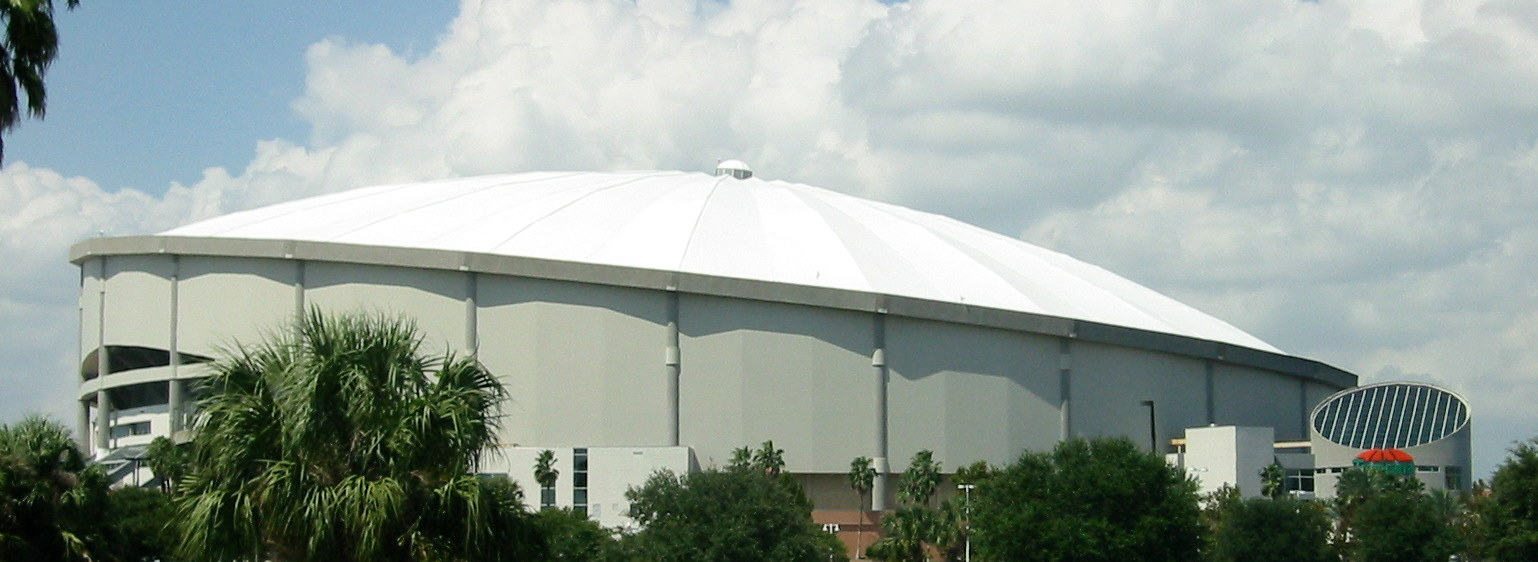
The 12th annual TLC: Tables, Ladders & Chairs was reportedly planned to be held at the Allstate Arena in the Chicago suburb of Rosemont, Illinois, but due to the COVID-19 pandemic, it was produced by way of a bio-secure bubble called the WWE ThunderDome, which at the time was hosted at Tropicana Field in St. Petersburg, Florida. It was WWE's first pay-per-view and livestreaming event to present the ThunderDome from Tropicana Field.

=== Background ===
TLC: Tables, Ladders & Chairs was an annual professional wrestling event generally produced every December by WWE since 2009. It was originally broadcast exclusively via pay-per-view (PPV) before it began simultaneously livestreaming on the WWE Network in 2014. The concept of the event was based on the primary matches of the card each containing a stipulation using tables, ladders, and chairs as legal weapons, with the main event generally being a Tables, Ladders, and Chairs match. Announced on September 1, 2020, the 12th TLC event was scheduled to be held on December 20 and featured wrestlers from the Raw and SmackDown brands.

==== Impact of the COVID-19 pandemic ====
According to WrestleVotes, the 2020 TLC event was planned to be held at the Allstate Arena in the Chicago suburb of Rosemont, Illinois. However, as a result of the COVID-19 pandemic that began affecting the industry in mid-March, WWE had to present the majority of its programming from a behind closed doors set. Initially, Raw and SmackDown's shows were done at the WWE Performance Center in Orlando, Florida. A limited number of Performance Center trainees and friends and family members of the wrestlers were later utilized to serve as the live audience. In late August, these programs were moved to a bio-secure bubble called the WWE ThunderDome, which at the time was hosted at Orlando's Amway Center. The select live audience was no longer utilized as the bubble allowed fans to attend the events virtually for free and be seen on the nearly 1,000 LED boards within the arena. Additionally, the ThunderDome utilized various special effects to further enhance wrestlers' entrances, and arena audio was mixed with that of the chants from the virtual fans.

Due to the expiration of their residency contract with the Amway Center, on November 19, WWE announced that the ThunderDome would be relocated to Tropicana Field in St. Petersburg, Florida, beginning with the December 11 episode of Friday Night SmackDown. This move was also done due to the start of the 2020–21 ECHL and NBA seasons as the Amway Center is the shared home of the Orlando Solar Bears (ECHL) and the Orlando Magic (NBA). Subsequently, the 2020 TLC event was WWE's first PPV and livestreaming event presented from the ThunderDome at Tropicana Field.

=== Storylines ===
The event comprised seven matches, including one on the Kickoff pre-show, that resulted from scripted storylines. Results were predetermined by WWE's writers on the Raw and SmackDown brands, while storylines were produced on WWE's weekly television shows, Monday Night Raw and Friday Night SmackDown.

At Survivor Series, Team Raw (AJ Styles, Keith Lee, Sheamus, Braun Strowman, and Riddle) defeated Team SmackDown in the men's 5-on-5 Survivor Series match without any member of their team being eliminated. The following night on Raw, WWE official Adam Pearce said that one of Team Raw's members would get a WWE Championship match against Drew McIntyre at TLC and allowed each to state their case. Last was Strowman, who became enraged over Pearce's use of the phrase "last but not least" and attacked Pearce; Strowman was suspended indefinitely. Former WWE Champion Randy Orton, who wanted a rematch after losing the title to McIntyre on Raw the previous week, and United States Champion Bobby Lashley, who was the only Raw champion to win their Champion vs. Champion match at Survivor Series, each individually confronted Pearce backstage and also stated their cases. Pearce scheduled three singles matches for that night, with the winners of each facing off in a triple threat match the following week to determine the number one contender. Riddle, Lee, and Styles advanced to the triple threat match by defeating Sheamus, Lashley, and Orton, respectively. Styles subsequently won the triple threat match to face McIntyre for the WWE Championship at TLC in a Tables, Ladders, and Chairs match.

After winning the WWE Championship from Drew McIntyre at Hell in a Cell on October 25, Randy Orton appeared on Alexa Bliss's talk show "A Moment of Bliss" on the following night's Raw—several weeks beforehand, Bliss aligned herself with Bray Wyatt and his alter-ego The Fiend. During the segment, Bliss referenced Orton's past rivalry with Wyatt at WrestleMania 33 in 2017. McIntyre then came out and attacked Orton until the lights went out. When they returned, The Fiend was standing behind Orton on the entrance ramp while McIntyre stood in the ring. McIntyre continued to brawl with Orton while The Fiend departed. The Fiend would continue to threaten and attack Orton over the next few weeks; after Orton lost the WWE Championship back to McIntyre on the November 16 episode of Raw, The Fiend caused Orton to lose an opportunity to regain the title the following week. Orton then appeared once again on "A Moment of Bliss", claiming to know The Fiend's weakness as Bliss herself. Orton was subsequently scheduled to face The Fiend at TLC. Before the event on the December 14 episode of Raw, Orton challenged Wyatt's cheery Firefly Fun House persona to a game of hide-and-seek that ended in a backstage brawl where Orton locked Wyatt inside of a wooden crate and set it ablaze. The Fiend then emerged from the flaming box and attacked Orton. Their match at TLC was then made a Firefly Inferno match.

On the September 14 episode of Raw, after the team of Lana and Natalya lost a tag team match, WWE Women's Tag Team Champions Nia Jax and Shayna Baszler appeared and Jax performed a Samoan drop on Lana through an announce table. Over the next nine weeks, Jax repeatedly put Lana through an announce table. Also during this time, Natalya ceased teaming with Lana. On the October 12 episode, Lana won a battle royal by last eliminating Natalya to earn a Raw Women's Championship match against Asuka. The title match took place the following week, which Lana lost. Following the match, Jax put Lana through an announce table once more. On the October 26 episode, Lana won a fatal four-way match to win a spot on the women's team for Team Raw at Survivor Series, where Lana emerged as the sole survivor after being ordered to not take part in the match by her teammates, which included Jax and Baszler. The following night on Raw, Lana was granted another Raw Women's Championship match against Asuka, but the match ended in a no-contest after Jax and Baszler interfered. This resulted in an impromptu non-title tag team match where Lana and Asuka defeated Jax and Baszler. The following week, Lana and Asuka defeated the champions once more in another non-title match. Jax and Baszler were subsequently scheduled to defend the Women's Tag Team Championship against Lana and Asuka at TLC. However, after Lana defeated Jax on the December 14 episode of Raw, an irate Jax and Baszler attacked the leg of Lana causing an injury, resulting in her removal from the championship match at TLC, requiring Asuka to find a new partner.

Ever since making his return to WWE and winning the Universal Championship at Payback, Roman Reigns began referring to himself as the "Tribal Chief" and the "Head of The Table" of the Anoaʻi family. Reigns's cousin Jey Uso joined Reigns after Reigns defeated him at Hell in a Cell. Differences then grew between Jey and Kevin Owens, who had both earned a spot on the men's team for Team SmackDown at Survivor Series; Team SmackDown ultimately lost. On the following SmackDown, Reigns lambasted Jey for the loss, stating that the other members of Team SmackDown did not respect Jey, and in turn, they did not respect Reigns or their family. This enraged Jey and during that episode's main event match between himself and Owens, Jey intentionally disqualified himself by attacking Owens with a steel chair. Owens retaliated and performed multiple Stunners on Jey and then called out Reigns. The following week, Owens challenged Reigns to a Tables, Ladders, and Chairs match for the Universal Championship at TLC, which Reigns accepted.

For several weeks, vignettes of a mystery woman claiming to be "untouchable" were shown on episodes of SmackDown. Following a five-month hiatus, Carmella was revealed as the mystery woman on the October 2 episode and reverted to being a heel. She did not have any physical confrontations until the November 6 episode when she appeared and attacked SmackDown Women's Champion Sasha Banks after Banks had successfully defended her title. Over the next two weeks, Carmella continued her attacks on Banks, who returned the favor on the November 27 episode by attacking Carmella during her backstage vignette. The following week, a title match between the two was scheduled for TLC. Before the event, the two faced each other in an impromptu championship match on the December 11 episode of SmackDown where Banks was disqualified after continuously attacking Carmella in the corner past the referee's five-count; although Carmella won, Banks retained as titles do not change hands by disqualification unless stipulated.

On the November 16 episode of Raw, The New Day (Kofi Kingston and Xavier Woods) defeated The Hurt Business (Cedric Alexander and Shelton Benjamin) to retain the Raw Tag Team Championship. A rematch the following week ended in a double countout, but when the match restarted, The New Day were able to retain. On the November 30 episode, Alexander defeated Woods. The following week, Kingston defeated Benjamin, but was defeated by Alexander immediately afterwards. On December 10, another title match between the two teams was scheduled for TLC.

== Event ==
Other on-screen personnel
Role:	Name:
English commentators	Michael Cole (SmackDown)
English commentators	Corey Graves (SmackDown)
English commentators	Tom Phillips (Raw)
English commentators	Samoa Joe (Raw)
English commentators	Byron Saxton (Raw)
Spanish commentators	Carlos Cabrera
Spanish commentators	Marcelo Rodriguez
Ring announcers	Greg Hamilton (SmackDown)
Ring announcers	Mike Rome (Raw)
Referees	Danilo Anfibio
Referees	Jason Ayers
Referees	Shawn Bennett
Referees	Dan Engler
Referees	Darrick Moore
Referees	Chad Patton
Referees	Rod Zapata
Interviewer	Kayla Braxton
Pre-show panel	Charly Caruso
Pre-show panel	Booker T
Pre-show panel	Peter Rosenberg
Pre-show panel	Jeff Jarrett

=== Pre-show ===
During the TLC: Tables, Ladders & Chairs Kickoff pre-show, an eight-man tag team match occurred, which saw the team of Big E, Daniel Bryan, Chad Gable, and Otis facing the team of King Corbin, Intercontinental Champion Sami Zayn, Cesaro, and Shinsuke Nakamura. In the end, Big E avoided Zayn's Helluva Kick attempt and performed the Big Ending on him to win the match.

=== Preliminary matches ===
The actual pay-per-view opened with Drew McIntyre defending the WWE Championship against AJ Styles (accompanied by his bodyguard, Omos) in a Tables, Ladders, and Chairs match. Both McIntyre and Styles took advantage of the stipulation and used the trio of weapons in attacking each other. In the closing moments, as McIntyre ascended the ladder, The Miz and John Morrison came out and prevented McIntyre from winning. The Miz then performed a Powerbomb on McIntyre through a table while John Morrison handed the referee Miz's Money in the Bank contract, converting the match into a triple threat Tables, Ladders, and Chairs match. As Miz attempted to climb the ladder to retrieve the title, Omos pulled him off the ladder and put him through a table. Morrison then attacked Omos with a chair, however, the unfazed Omos went after Morrison, who retreated backstage. After a battle atop the ladders, McIntyre performed a Claymore Kick on Miz and ascended the ladder to unhook the title and retain.

Next, Sasha Banks defended the SmackDown Women's Championship against Carmella (accompanied by her sommelier, Reginald Thomas). During the match, Banks paid homage to Eddie Guerrero by performing the Three Amigos and Frog Splash on Carmella for a nearfall. Banks applied the Bank Statement on Carmella only for Reginald to pull her out of the ring. Carmella performed two Superkicks on Banks for a nearfall. In the climax, Banks applied the Bank Statement on Carmella, forcing her to tap to retain the title.

After that, The New Day (Kofi Kingston and Xavier Woods) defended the Raw Tag Team Championship against The Hurt Business' Cedric Alexander and Shelton Benjamin (accompanied by MVP). In the closing moments, as Benjamin was preparing his next move on Kingston, Alexander blind tagged himself in to Benjamin's surprise and then performed the Lumbar Check on Kingston to win the titles. Despite Alexander's questionable actions, Benjamin was still pleased with the result. After the match, United States Champion Bobby Lashley came out and celebrated with his Hurt Business stablemates, with the stable now holding two-thirds of the men's titles on Raw, excluding the open-branded 24/7 Championship.

In the fourth match, Nia Jax and Shayna Baszler defended the WWE Women's Tag Team Championship against Raw Women's Champion Asuka and her mystery partner, revealed as the returning Charlotte Flair, who had been absent since June thanks to an arm injury (kayfabe) incurred by Jax. In the end, Flair applied the Figure-Eight Leg Lock on Baszler only for Jax to intervene and break up the submission. Baszler then locked in the Kirifuda Clutch on Flair, however, Flair escaped and performed Natural Selection on Baszler to win the title for the first time. Subsequently, this would be Asuka's second reign with the titles, as well as becoming a double champion, while Flair became WWE's fifth Women's Triple Crown Champion and fourth Women's Grand Slam Champion.

In the penultimate match, Roman Reigns (accompanied by Paul Heyman) defended the Universal Championship against Kevin Owens in a Tables, Ladders, and Chairs match. Mere moments before the match began, Owens attacked Reigns. After the bell sounded, Owens would dominate Reigns. Shortly thereafter, Jey Uso interjected himself while Owens had the upper hand on Reigns. As Jey attempted a Superkick on Owens outside the ring, Owens blocked the maneuver with a chair. Owens then placed Jey's leg in a chair and stomped on Jey's leg. Despite medical personnel arriving and taking Jey backstage, he returned later to assist Reigns further. Owens performed a Stunner on Reigns and then put Jey through the announce table with a Pop-up Powerbomb. Reigns performed a Uranage (more like a Chokeslam) on Owens through a table and then through a second table with a Samoan Drop. Reigns then ascended the ladder, however, he noticed Owens rise to his feet and get in the ring. Reigns then performed a Spear on Owens through a table in the corner. As Reigns attempted a second Spear on Owens outside the ring, Owens moved out of the way and Reigns crashed through the barricade. Shortly after, Owens ascended the ladder, but Reigns intercepted. Owens performed two Superkicks on Reigns. Owens attempted a Pop-up Powerbomb on Reigns, however, Reigns countered with a Superman Punch. As Reigns attempted a Spear on Owens, Owens countered with a Pop-up Powerbomb through a table. In the end, Owens ascended the ladder again, however, he was intercepted by Jey once more. Reigns then attacked Owens (who was atop a ladder) with a low blow, applied the guillotine choke on Owens, who then fell off the ladder, allowing Reigns to unhook the title to retain.

=== Main event ===
In the main event, Randy Orton faced The Fiend in a Firefly Inferno match. At the start of the match, Orton attacked The Fiend, however, he was unaffected by Orton's attacks and laughed hysterically to taunt Orton. The Fiend performed Sister Abigail on Orton and then posed, which ignited several poles and braziers around the arena on fire. The Fiend attacked Orton with a leather strap, after which, he ignited one end of the strap and attempted to attack Orton, however, Orton intercepted. After using a pickaxe and an axe handle on Orton, The Fiend brought out a rocking chair at ringside (the same rocking chair that Bray Wyatt utilized during his Eater of Worlds gimmick). He doused the chair with gasoline with a trail of gasoline leading to it. He then sat Orton in the rocking chair and attempted to set Orton on fire, however, Orton was able to escape before the trailing flames reached him, which engulfed the chair. Orton wrapped a steel chain around his fist and punched The Fiend a few times, then performed a DDT from the apron to the floor. As Orton attempted an RKO, The Fiend applied The Mandible Claw on Orton. The Fiend attempted to set Orton ablaze by pushing him against a brazier, however, Orton countered and The Fiend's back caught on fire, thus Orton won the match. Afterward, The Fiend, who was still on fire, ran after Orton who was in the ring where Orton performed an RKO on him. A conflicted Orton then doused The Fiend's lifeless body with gasoline and set it ablaze, after which, he posed on the stage to end the show as The Fiend's body continued to burn.

== Aftermath ==
=== Raw ===
New WWE Women's Tag Team Champions Charlotte Flair and Asuka opened the following night's episode of Raw. Flair stated that her friend Asuka needed a partner and she answered the call. As Flair was about to comment regarding Asuka's Raw Women's Championship, they were interrupted by the former champions, Nia Jax and Shayna Baszler. Jax and Baszler then insulted Flair and Asuka until Dana Brooke and Mandy Rose came out. Brooke and Rose mocked Jax and Baszler for losing the titles. Flair then called out a referee and a tag team match featuring Jax and Baszler against Brooke and Rose ensued while Asuka and Flair were on commentary. Jax and Baszler won the match, however, they were thrown out of the ring by Brooke and Rose after the match. On the January 25 episode, Asuka and Flair were scheduled to defend the tag titles in a rematch against Jax and Baszler at the Royal Rumble.

Also on the following night's Raw, The Hurt Business (MVP, United States Champion Bobby Lashley, and new Raw Tag Team Champions Cedric Alexander and Shelton Benjamin) hosted a segment of the VIP Lounge. MVP boasted about The Hurt Business holding the U.S. and Raw Tag Titles, while Lashley declared that there was no one who could beat him. The Hardy Bros (Jeff Hardy and Riddle) then came out and congratulated them on their win at TLC, but said that The Hurt Business were greedy. The Hardy Bros then faced MVP and Lashley in a tag team match later that night in a losing effort.

The Miz and John Morrison hosted a "Miz TV" segment with guest AJ Styles (accompanied by Omos). Miz apologized to Styles for costing them both the WWE Championship. Omos interjected and brought up the fact that it was Morrison who cashed in the Money in the Bank briefcase for Miz, who then saw a loophole, realizing that only the contract holder himself can cash in the briefcase and demanded the briefcase be returned to him. WWE Champion Drew McIntyre then came out, along with Sheamus and Keith Lee, and a brawl ensued. A six-man tag team Street Fight occurred later on where the team of McIntyre, Sheamus, and Lee defeated the team of Styles, Miz, and Morrison. The following week, Miz and Morrison were confronted backstage by Adam Pearce, who returned the Money in the Bank briefcase to Miz, explaining that they were correct in that only Miz can cash in the contract, not Morrison, thus Miz's cash-in at TLC was nullified. Miz would eventually cash in the Money in the Bank contract at Elimination Chamber on McIntyre to win the WWE Championship for a second time. With the win, Miz also became the first ever two-time Grand Slam Champion.

Randy Orton stated that he enjoyed burning The Fiend alive and declared that The Fiend was no more. The lights then began to go out, which usually signals The Fiend, however, instead of The Fiend appearing, Alexa Bliss appeared in the ring on a swing set which Bliss referred to as "Alexa's Playground". Bliss then warned Orton that if The Fiend returned, it would be like nothing Orton had ever seen before. The following week, Bliss invited Orton to her Playground; however, Orton instead appeared inside of the Firefly Fun House and destroyed Wyatt's puppets. An angry Bliss then challenged Orton to meet her later that night in the ring, which Orton accepted. Bliss challenged Orton to set her on fire just as he did to The Fiend. Despite Bliss dousing herself in gasoline, Orton initially rejected the idea as he knew it was exactly what she wanted. However, after more taunting, the show closed with the lights going out and a shot of Orton smiling as he held a lit match, seemingly indicating that Orton set Bliss on fire. The next episode revealed that Orton did not set Bliss on fire, stating that in facing The Fiend, it changes a person, and in this case, it caused Orton to show Bliss compassion and mercy, which he resented himself for. The Fiend made his return at Fastlane, where he caused Orton to lose to Bliss in an intergender match. This led to a match between The Fiend and Orton at WrestleMania 37.

=== SmackDown ===
Due to the assist of Jey Uso at TLC, a rematch between Roman Reigns and Kevin Owens for the Universal Championship was scheduled as a Steel Cage match for the following episode of SmackDown. Jey would once again get involved in the match by handcuffing Owens to the steel cage. This allowed Reigns to escape the cage and once again retain the title. The following week, Owens defeated Jey, and after the match, Owens continued attacking Jey. Reigns then appeared, and he and Jey sent Owens from the ThunderDome set through tables on the stage. Owens returned on the January 15 episode and became Reigns' opponent for the title at the Royal Rumble in a Last Man Standing match, replacing WWE official Adam Pearce, who was originally booked for the match but was able to name Owens as his replacement "due to injury".

Despite losing, Carmella taunted Sasha Banks over the next few weeks, wanting a rematch for the SmackDown Women's Championship. Banks accepted on the condition that she faced Reginald first in a match. Banks defeated Reginald on the January 22 episode in an intergender match, thus a rematch between Banks and Carmella was scheduled for the Royal Rumble.

For winning the TLC Kickoff pre-show match by pinning Sami Zayn, Big E was granted an Intercontinental Championship match against Zayn on the following episode of SmackDown. Big E subsequently defeated Zayn in a lumberjack match to win the title for the second time in his career, last winning it in November 2013.

=== Future ===
This was the final TLC event held until 2026, as an event for 2021 had been scheduled, however, it was canceled in favor of an event called Day 1 that took place on New Year's Day 2022. It would in turn be the final TLC event held for the main roster, as after six years, TLC was reinstated in December 2026 for WWE's developmental brand, NXT. The 2020 TLC event would also be the final main roster PPV and livestreaming event to be held in December until Wrestlepalooza in 2026. This was also the final TLC event to air on the WWE Network, as WWE began phasing out the platform in 2021 by moving its content to other services, with the WWE Network completely shutdown by April 2026.

== Results ==
No.	Results	Stipulations	Times
1^{P}	Alpha Academy (Chad Gable, and Otis), Big E, and Daniel Bryan defeated King Corbin, Sami Zayn, Cesaro, and Shinsuke Nakamura by pinfall	Eight-man tag team match	8:35
2	Drew McIntyre (c) defeated AJ Styles (with Omos) and The Miz (with John Morrison) by retrieving the championship belt (Note: The Miz cashed in his Money in the Bank contract during the match, converting the match into a Triple Threat TLC match; however, the cash-in would later be ruled invalid due to John Morrison cashing in the contract on his behalf (as only the contract holder himself can cash it in), thus this did not count as a cash-in match and the contract was returned to Miz.)	Triple threat Tables, Ladders, and Chairs match for the WWE Championship	27:05
3	Sasha Banks (c) defeated Carmella (with Reginald) by submission	Singles match for the WWE SmackDown Women's Championship	12:10
4	The Hurt Business (Cedric Alexander and Shelton Benjamin) (with MVP) defeated The New Day (Kofi Kingston and Xavier Woods) (c) by pinfall	Tag team match for the WWE Raw Tag Team Championship	10:00
5	Asuka and Charlotte Flair defeated Nia Jax and Shayna Baszler (c) by pinfall	Tag team match for the WWE Women's Tag Team Championship	10:05
6	Roman Reigns (c) (with Paul Heyman) defeated Kevin Owens by retrieving the championship belt	Tables, Ladders, and Chairs match for the WWE Universal Championship	24:45
7	Randy Orton defeated The Fiend by setting The Fiend on fire	Firefly Inferno match	12:00
(c) / – the champion(s) heading into the match; P / – the match was broadcast on the pre-show
