= SummerSlam (2020) =

WWE pay-per-view and livestreaming event

- Promotional poster featuring "The Fiend" Bray Wyatt
- Promotion: WWE
- Brand(s): Raw; SmackDown
- Date: August 23, 2020
- City: Orlando, Florida (Note: The SummerSlam was originally scheduled to be held at TD Garden in Boston, Massachusetts.)
- Venue: WWE ThunderDome at Amway Center
- Attendance: 0 (behind closed doors) (Note: The event was held without a paying audience due to the COVID-19 pandemic in the United States, though it featured a live crowd of virtual fans via WWE's ThunderDome viewing experience.)
- Tagline: You'll Never See It Coming

WWE event chronology
← Previous; NXT TakeOver XXX	Next → Payback

SummerSlam chronology
← Previous; 2019	Next → 2021

The 2020 SummerSlam was a professional wrestling pay-per-view (PPV) and livestreaming event produced by WWE, held for wrestlers from the promotion's main roster brands, Raw and SmackDown. It was the 33rd annual SummerSlam and took place on August 23, 2020, from the WWE ThunderDome, a bio-secure bubble that at the time was hosted at the Amway Center in Orlando, Florida. This was WWE's first PPV and livestreaming event to be produced from the ThunderDome, which debuted with the broadcast of Friday Night SmackDown two days prior.

The event was originally scheduled to take place at the TD Garden in Boston, Massachusetts, but due to the COVID-19 pandemic, Boston mayor Marty Walsh announced the suspension of all large-scale gatherings and that no permit would be issued for an event that could draw a large crowd before September 7. Since mid-March, WWE had presented the majority of Raw and SmackDown's shows from the WWE Performance Center in Orlando with no fans in attendance due to the pandemic. With the move to the Amway Center, SummerSlam was the first major WWE event held outside of the Performance Center since March, although still without fans physically in attendance; fans were instead able to attend and be seen virtually on LED boards in the venue through the ThunderDome arena staging. This also marked the last SummerSlam to be held in a traditional arena, as all future events have been held in stadiums. This would also be the final SummerSlam to livestream on the American version of the WWE Network, which merged under Peacock in April 2021.

Eight matches were contested at the event, including one on the Kickoff pre-show. In the main event, which was the main match for SmackDown, "The Fiend" Bray Wyatt defeated Braun Strowman in a Falls Count Anywhere match to win the Universal Championship for a second time. Following the match, Roman Reigns returned following a five-month hiatus and attacked both men, turning heel. In the penultimate match, which was the main match for Raw, Drew McIntyre defeated Randy Orton to retain the WWE Championship. In other prominent matches, Mandy Rose defeated Sonya Deville in a No Disqualification Loser Leaves WWE match, and Asuka defeated Sasha Banks to win the Raw Women's Championship for a second time after losing her match against Bayley for the SmackDown Women's Championship in the opening bout. The event was also notable for the in-ring debut of Rey Mysterio's son Dominik Mysterio, who fought Seth Rollins in a street fight in a losing effort. Additionally, it was the first SummerSlam since 2009 to feature MVP, and it was also the first SummerSlam since 2011 to not feature Brock Lesnar, who competed in the main event match for the past six years and in 2012.

== Production ==
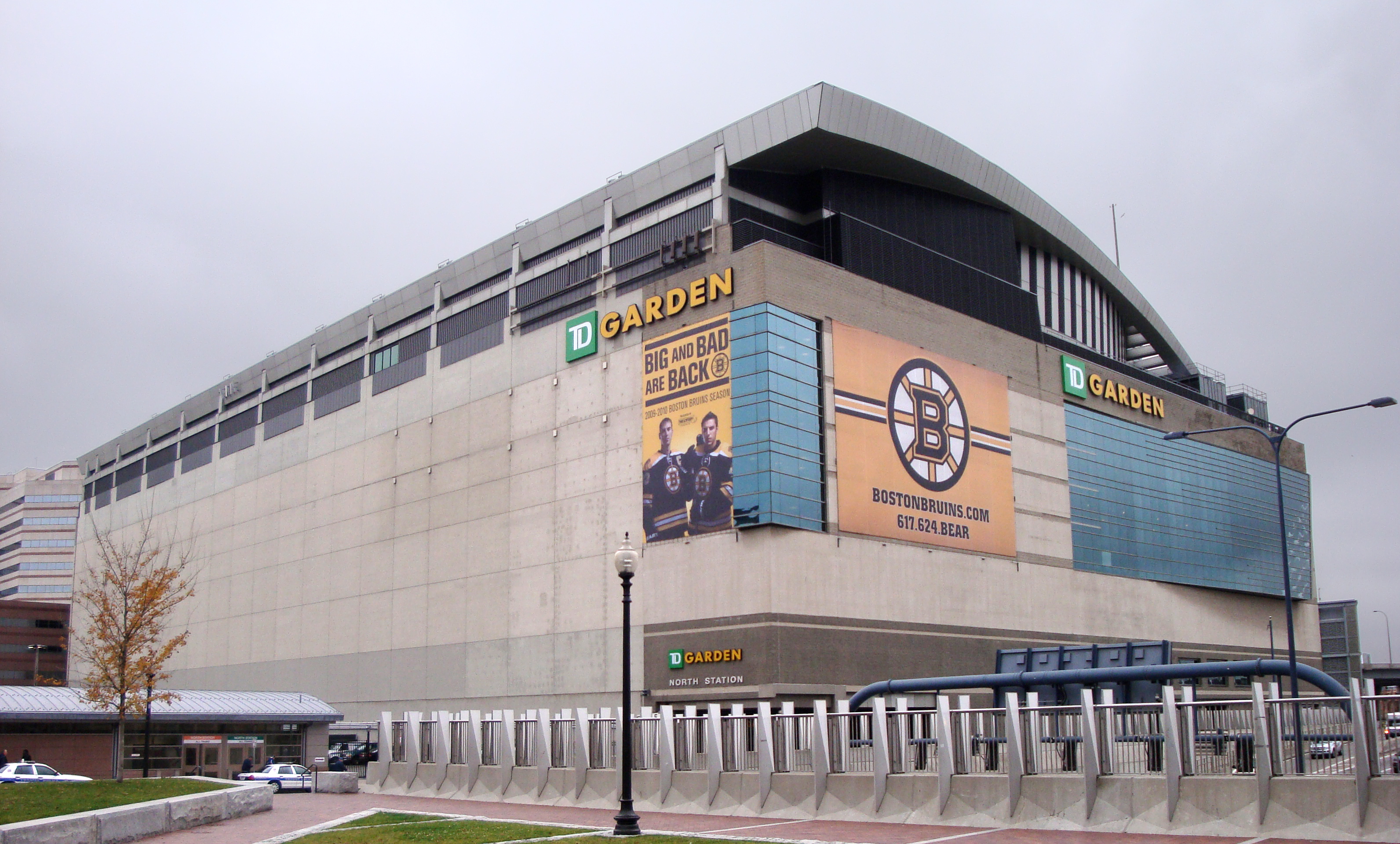
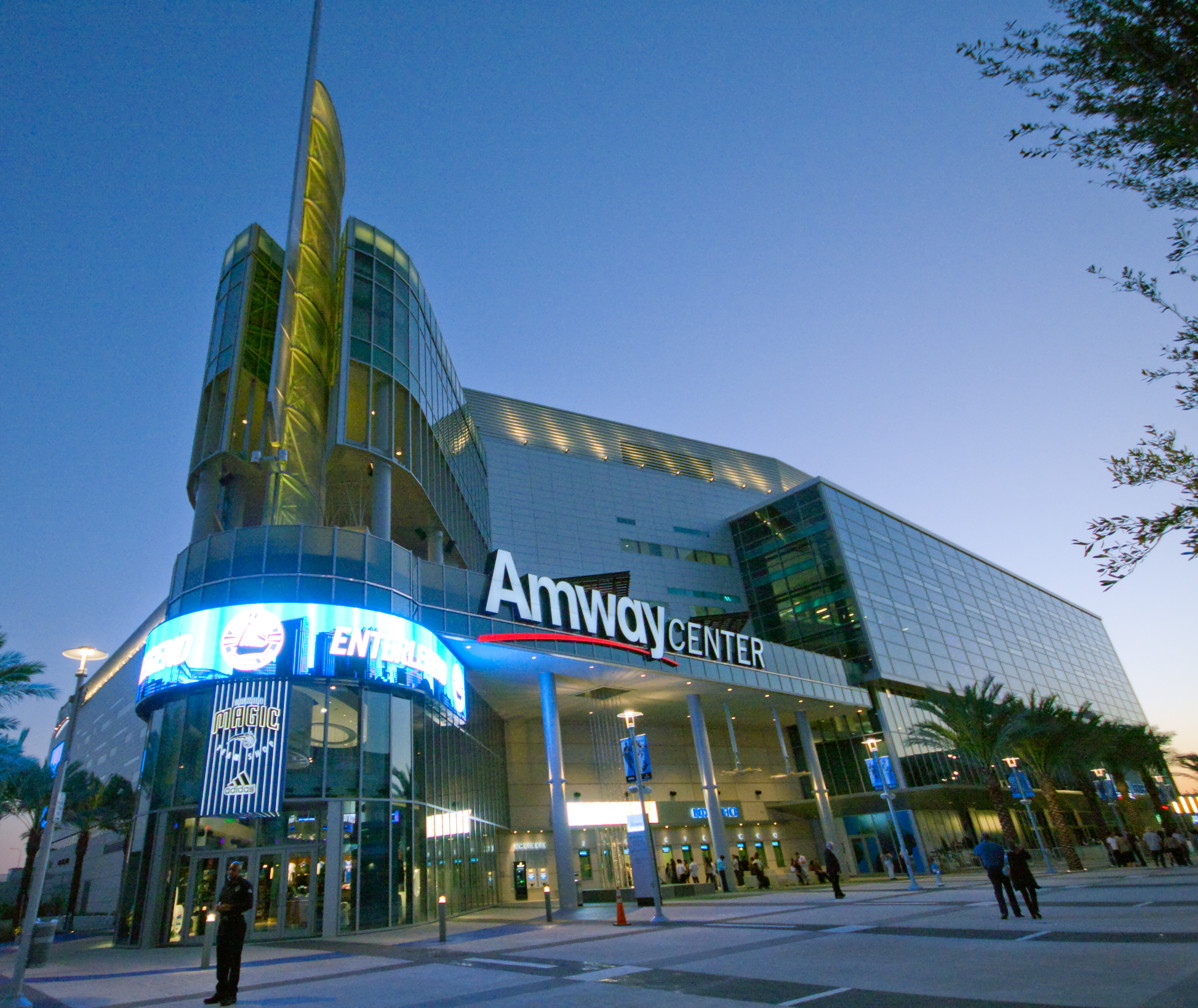
The 33rd annual SummerSlam was originally planned to be held at TD Garden in Boston, Massachusetts, but due to the COVID-19 pandemic, it was produced by way of a bio-secure bubble called the WWE ThunderDome, which at the time was hosted at the Amway Center in Orlando, Florida. It was WWE's first pay-per-view and livestreaming event produced from the ThunderDome.

=== Background ===
SummerSlam is an annual professional wrestling event produced every August by WWE since 1988. It was originally broadcast exclusively via pay-per-view (PPV) before it began simultaneously livestreaming on the WWE Network in 2014. Dubbed "The Biggest Party of the Summer", it is one of the promotion's original four PPVs, along with WrestleMania, Royal Rumble, and Survivor Series, referred to as the "Big Four". It has since become considered WWE's second biggest event of the year behind WrestleMania. Announced on August 8, 2019, the 33rd SummerSlam featured wrestlers from the Raw and SmackDown brand divisions.

==== Impact of the COVID-19 pandemic ====
As a result of the COVID-19 pandemic, WWE had to present the majority of its programming for Raw and SmackDown from a behind closed doors set at the WWE Performance Center in Orlando, Florida beginning mid-March, although in late May, the promotion began using Performance Center trainees to serve as the live audience, which was further expanded to friends and family members of the wrestlers in mid-June. SummerSlam, as well as the preceding night's NXT TakeOver XXX, were originally scheduled to take place in Boston, Massachusetts at the TD Garden, with SummerSlam on August 23, 2020. On May 8, the ongoing pandemic forced Boston mayor Marty Walsh to suspend all large-scale gatherings until September 7, effectively canceling WWE's planned events in the city.

Wrestling journalist Dave Meltzer reported that the promotion was open to moving SummerSlam to September if it meant having fans in attendance. However, an advertisement that aired during The Horror Show at Extreme Rules confirmed that SummerSlam would still be taking place on August 23, but with no reference to a city or venue. Although Pro Wrestling Insider had reported that the event would be held at the WWE Performance Center, the promotion put out an official statement on July 23 that the announcement of a new location would be forthcoming. WWE also stated that refunds would be issued at original point of purchase. PWInsider then reported that WWE were looking into hosting SummerSlam on a cruise ship or on a beach.

On August 17, it was made official that SummerSlam would emanate from the Amway Center, a larger venue also located in Orlando. This made SummerSlam the first major WWE event to be held outside of the Performance Center since March. WWE also entered into an agreement with the Amway Center in which all future broadcasts of Monday Night Raw, Friday Night SmackDown, and PPV and livestreaming events would be held at the venue "for the foreseeable future". Along with the move, WWE partnered with the full-service fan experience company The Famous Group to provide a "virtual fan experience", a bio-secure bubble named the WWE ThunderDome, which was first utilized for the August 21 episode of SmackDown. Drones, lasers, pyro, smoke, and projections were utilized to make the wrestlers' entrances "better than WrestleMania", according to WWE Executive Vice President of Television Production Kevin Dunn, who further noted that "We can now do things production-wise that we could never otherwise do". They also installed nearly 1,000 LED boards in the Amway Center to allow for rows and rows of virtual fans, who could register for a free virtual seat. Arena audio was also mixed with that of the virtual fans so that chants from the fans could be heard.

=== Storylines ===
The event comprised eight matches, including one on the Kickoff pre-show, that resulted from scripted storylines. Results were predetermined by WWE's writers on the Raw and SmackDown brands, while storylines were produced on WWE's weekly television shows, Monday Night Raw and Friday Night SmackDown.

At Money in the Bank, Braun Strowman retained the Universal Championship against Bray Wyatt, who wrestled as his Firefly Fun House character. After being absent for a few weeks, Wyatt returned on the June 19 episode of SmackDown, but was interrupted by Strowman. Wyatt stated their rivalry was just getting started before appearing as his old cult leader persona of The Wyatt Family, which formerly included Strowman and from where Strowman had originally made his WWE debut. This led to a non-title match between the two called the Wyatt Swamp Fight at The Horror Show at Extreme Rules, where Wyatt, fighting as his old Eater of Worlds self, defeated Strowman, who disappeared somewhere in the swamp. As Wyatt tried to leave himself, he was pulled back into the water, only for his alter ego The Fiend to appear. On the following SmackDown, Wyatt stated that his old Eater of Worlds self was done for now and that The Fiend had been unleashed. The following week, Wyatt said that The Fiend wanted the Universal Championship and that no one was safe until he got it, which was made evident later that night when The Fiend attacked Alexa Bliss, Strowman's old tag team partner from Season 1 of Mixed Match Challenge. On the August 7 episode, The Fiend tried attacking Bliss again, who seemingly showed affection for The Fiend, causing him to back off. Strowman then appeared on the TitanTron, stating he did not care about Bliss and that he emerged a monster from the swamp. Strowman then accepted The Fiend's challenge for the Universal Championship at SummerSlam. The following week saw Strowman attacking Bliss to lure out The Fiend, who appeared in the ring to confront Strowman. On the August 22 episode of Talking Smack, the stipulation was changed to a Falls Count Anywhere match.

On the July 27 episode of Raw, Randy Orton cut a promo listing many of his accolades before declaring that he wanted the WWE Championship again. He then issued a challenge to champion Drew McIntyre for a title match at SummerSlam. Later that night, McIntyre accepted Orton's challenge and then defeated Dolph Ziggler in an Extreme Rules match in a rematch from The Horror Show at Extreme Rules, preventing Ziggler from earning the title opportunity. Following the match, Orton attacked McIntyre with an RKO.

On the July 20 episode of Raw, Andrade and Angel Garza lost to Raw Tag Team Champions The Street Profits (Montez Ford and Angelo Dawkins). The following week, Andrade and Garza won a triple threat tag team match to earn a title match at SummerSlam.

After United States Champion Apollo Crews repeatedly declined MVP's offer to join his faction, later dubbed The Hurt Business, the two faced each other in a non-title match on the June 29 episode of Raw that was won by MVP. After the match, Crews was brutally attacked by MVP's teammate Bobby Lashley. The following week, MVP unveiled a new United States Championship belt and stated that he would face Crews for the title at The Horror Show at Extreme Rules. At the event, however, Crews was unable to compete due to failing his pre-match physical thanks to Lashley's attack. MVP then declared himself winner by forfeit and unofficially claimed himself as the new United States Champion. Crews, with the older United States title belt, returned on the August 3 episode of Raw where he formally faced MVP in a title match where Crews retained. Celebrating his victory, Crews later stated in a backstage interview that he would give the old belt to his children while he kept the new belt MVP introduced. MVP then demanded a rematch for SummerSlam and Crews accepted. On the August 17 episode, Crews defeated The Hurt Business's Shelton Benjamin, thus banning Benjamin and Lashley from ringside during the title match at SummerSlam, which was set to occur on the Kickoff pre-show.

Following several weeks of Seth Rollins tormenting and taunting Rey Mysterio, the two finally faced each other at The Horror Show at Extreme Rules in an Eye for an Eye match in which one opponent had to extract an eye of the other to win the match, which was won by Rollins. Mysterio's son Dominik appeared on the July 27 episode of Raw to confront Rollins and his disciple Murphy for Rollins's actions, as well as for Rollins gloating about it. Although Dominik attacked Rollins and Murphy, they eventually overpowered Dominik until Aleister Black came out to Dominik's aid. The brawl, however, resulted in Murphy injuring Black's eye using the corner of the steel steps. The following week, Dominik challenged Rollins to a match at SummerSlam. Later, after Rollins and Murphy taunted commentator Tom Phillips (which led to fellow commentator Samoa Joe defending Phillips), they were both attacked from behind by Dominik with a kendo stick. Rollins then accepted Dominik's challenge. During the contract signing the following week, in which Dominik also signed a contract to officially become a WWE wrestler, Rollins stated that Dominik could use any kind of weapon he wanted. After Rollins defeated Humberto Carrillo, Rollins and Murphy attacked Dominik with kendo sticks. Their SummerSlam match was later made a Street Fight.

At The Horror Show at Extreme Rules, the Raw Women's Championship match between Sasha Banks and defending champion Asuka ended in controversy when Asuka inadvertently spat green mist in the referee's face, which led to Bayley removing the referee's shirt and counting the pin for Banks to unofficially win the title. The following night on Raw, WWE Chief Brand Officer Stephanie McMahon stated that neither Banks or Asuka won at Extreme Rules and announced a rematch between the two for the following week in a match where the title could be won by pinfall, submission, disqualification, or count out. During the ensuing match, Bayley attacked Asuka's tag team partner Kairi Sane backstage. Asuka then left the match to check on Sane, resulting in her losing by count-out, thus Banks won the title for a record fifth time. On the August 3 episode, Asuka demanded a rematch for the title, however, Banks stated that she had to defeat Bayley to earn the match at SummerSlam, which Asuka did the following week. On that Friday's SmackDown, as Bayley did not have a challenger for her SmackDown Women's Championship at SummerSlam, Stephanie McMahon announced a triple brand battle royal for the following week, featuring wrestlers from Raw, SmackDown, and NXT, with the winner facing Bayley at the event. Surprise entrant Asuka won the battle royal, thus double booking Asuka to face the WWE Women's Tag Team Champions in singles matches for their respective singles titles. On the August 21 episode of SmackDown, both Banks and Bayley faced Naomi in a Beat the Clock Challenge to determine the order of their respective title defenses against Asuka with the loser defending first; Banks subsequently won as she defeated Naomi, who in turn defeated Bayley.

At the onset of 2020, a romance began between Mandy Rose and Heavy Machinery's Otis. They were set to have a Valentine's Day date, however, Dolph Ziggler arrived first, stealing the date with Rose. Prior to WrestleMania 36, it was revealed that Rose's Fire and Desire tag team partner Sonya Deville had conspired with Ziggler to sabotage the date by sending a fake text to Otis that Rose was running late. Otis then defeated Ziggler at the event with the help of Rose, who also attacked Deville. Rose then entered into a months long feud with Deville, who claimed that Rose was all looks and no talent. This culminated on the July 31 episode of SmackDown where Deville attacked Rose backstage and cut some of her hair off. Rose, now sporting shorter hair, then challenged Deville to a Hair vs. Hair match at SummerSlam, which Deville accepted. The following week, Rose had a change of heart, thinking there was still some good in Deville, and asked to put their rivalry behind them. Deville instead raised the stakes and changed the stipulation of their match to a no disqualification match where the loser leaves WWE. This stipulation change was brought about due to a real life incident involving Deville; her home had been broken into by a stalker in Florida. Her lawyers cited it was not a good idea to have a shaved head while in court.

== Event ==
Other on-screen personnel
Role:	Name:
English commentators	Michael Cole (SmackDown)
English commentators	Corey Graves (SmackDown)
English commentators	Tom Phillips (Raw)
English commentators	Samoa Joe (Raw)
English commentators	Byron Saxton (Raw)
Spanish commentator	Carlos Cabrera
Ring announcers	Greg Hamilton (SmackDown)
Ring announcers	Mike Rome (Raw)
Referees	Danilo Anfibio
Referees	Shawn Bennett
Referees	John Cone
Referees	Dan Engler
Referees	Darrick Moore
Referees	Eddie Orengo
Referees	Chad Patton
Referees	Ryan Tran
Interviewers	Kayla Braxton
Interviewers	Sarah Schreiber
Pre-show panel	Charly Caruso
Pre-show panel	John "Bradshaw" Layfield
Pre-show panel	Peter Rosenberg
Pre-show panel	Renee Young
Pre-show panel	Booker T

=== Pre-show ===
During the SummerSlam Kickoff pre-show, Apollo Crews defended the United States Championship against MVP with MVP's stablemates Bobby Lashley and Shelton Benjamin banned from ringside. In the end, Crews performed a Toss Powerbomb on MVP to retain the title. Following the match, Benjamin and Lashley came down to the ring to attack Crews, however, Crews escaped.

=== Preliminary matches ===
The actual pay-per-view opened with Bayley (accompanied by Sasha Banks) defending the SmackDown Women's Championship against Asuka. In the end, Asuka attempted to attack Bayley, who was teetering on the ring ropes, however, Bayley moved out of the way and Asuka inadvertently knocked off Banks, who had been standing on the ring apron to try and distract Asuka. Bayley then performed a roll-up on Asuka to retain the title. Following the match, Bayley and Banks attacked Asuka.

Next, The Street Profits (Angelo Dawkins and Montez Ford) defended the Raw Tag Team Championship against Andrade and Angel Garza (accompanied by Zelina Vega). The climax saw Vega stand on the ring apron to distract the referee. Garza performed a Superkick on Dawkins, who bumped into Vega knocking her off the ring apron. Dawkins then performed a Powerbomb on Garza and Ford performed From the Heavens on Garza to retain the titles.

After that, Mandy Rose faced Sonya Deville in a no disqualification match where the loser would leave WWE. During the first half of the match, Rose and Deville fought at ringside, where Rose performed a flying Lariat on Deville off the announce table. Deville attacked Rose with a chair and slammed her head on the announce table. Rose performed three Running Knees, a Fairytale Ending, and a fourth Running Knee on Deville to win the match. Following the match, Otis came out to celebrate with Rose where Rose performed her own rendition of The Caterpillar, Otis's finisher.

In the next match, Seth Rollins (accompanied by Murphy) fought Dominik Mysterio (accompanied by his father, Rey Mysterio) in a Street Fight. This was Dominik's first match as a WWE wrestler. Dominik performed a Russian Legsweep on Rollins from the top turnbuckle onto table below. Later on, Rey Mysterio tried to interfere but Dominik told him not to do so. Later on, Rollins handcuffed Rey to the second rope. In the end, Rollins performed The Stomp on Dominik in front of Rey to win the match.

Next, Sasha Banks (accompanied by Bayley) defended the Raw Women's Championship against Asuka. During the match, Banks performed a Powerbomb from the ring apron on Asuka. Asuka applied an Ankle Lock on Banks, who rolled through. Asuka countered a Superplex attempt into a DDT on Banks for a nearfall. Asuka performed a Missile Dropkick from the top rope on Banks for a nearfall. Banks attempted a Frog Splash, but Asuka moved out of the way. Asuka then applied the Asuka Lock on Banks, who countered into a pinning combination for a nearfall, after which, Banks applied the Bank Statement. As Banks brought Asuka to the middle of the ring, Asuka countered into the Asuka Lock, but Banks escaped. The end saw a similar situation from the event's SmackDown Women's Championship match occur, with the roles of Banks and Bayley switched, however, Bayley moved out of the way. Asuka then attacked Bayley, but as Banks attempted the Bank Statement, Asuka reversed into the Asuka Lock to force Banks to submit, thus winning the title for a second time.

In the penultimate match, Drew McIntyre defended the WWE Championship against Randy Orton. In the climax, after a back-and-forth contest, Orton attempted a Punt Kick on McIntyre, however, McIntyre countered with a powerbomb. As McIntyre attempted a Claymore Kick on Orton, Orton avoided it, however, McIntyre performed a backslide pin on Orton to retain the title.

=== Main event ===
In the main event, Braun Strowman defended the Universal Championship against "The Fiend" Bray Wyatt in a Falls Count Anywhere match. During the match, the two fought up the entrance ramp and inside the gorilla position. In the closing moments, Strowman used a box cutter to cut the top ring canvas to expose the wooden flooring. The Fiend countered an attack from Strowman and performed a Uranage and two consecutive Sister Abigails on Strowman onto the exposed wood to regain the title for a second time. After the match, a returning Roman Reigns (in his first appearance in five months) appeared and performed a Spear on The Fiend. Reigns then performed a Spear on Strowman, who was staggering at ringside, and attacking him with multiple chair shots. Reigns then returned to the ring to execute another Spear on The Fiend before hoisting up the Universal Championship belt.

== Reception ==
Dave Meltzer rated the WWE Championship match 4.25 stars, the highest of the night. Meanwhile, the main event received 1 star, the lowest of the night. Elsewhere on the card, the kick-off show match received 2.25 stars, the SmackDown Women's Championship match received 3.25 stars, the Raw Tag Team Championship match received 2 stars, the Loser Leaves WWE match received 2.75 stars, and the street fight and the Raw Women's Championship match received 3.75 stars.

== Aftermath ==
The WWE ThunderDome would continue to be used until mid-July 2021, but changed venues twice during this time (but still in Florida) due to other sporting events requiring use of the venues. It first was relocated to Tropicana Field in St. Petersburg in December before moving to the Yuengling Center in Tampa in April 2021. After WrestleMania 37 that same month was held at a reduced venue capacity, which was WWE's first event back with live fans in attendance, the promotion resumed live touring with full capacity crowds in mid-July. As a result, this was the final SummerSlam to be held in an arena, as the following year, SummerSlam began to be hosted at National Football League (NFL) stadiums across the country. This was also the final SummerSlam to livestream on the American version of the WWE Network, which merged under Peacock in April 2021.

=== Raw ===
The following night on Raw, WWE Champion Drew McIntyre gloated how he had defeated "the greatest wrestler ever" with a wrestling move, and stated that he knew that Randy Orton wanted a rematch. As McIntyre made his exit, Orton attacked McIntyre and delivered two Punts to him. Later, McIntyre attacked Orton during Orton's match against the debuting Keith Lee and the brawl ended with Orton delivering a third Punt to McIntyre, taking him out for the next couple of weeks. On the August 31 episode, Orton earned himself another title opportunity against McIntyre for the WWE Championship at Clash of Champions.

Sasha Banks challenged Asuka to a rematch for the Raw Women's Championship, but as a lumberjack match. However, Banks was unsuccessful in regaining the title, thus ending their feud. However, the two faced each other again at Survivor Series on November 22, but as a champion vs. champion match with Banks as SmackDown Women's Champion, where Banks was victorious.

Dominik Mysterio teamed with his father Rey Mysterio in a tag team match against Seth Rollins and Murphy, but the match ended in a disqualification after Retribution attacked the Mysterios. On August 28, a rematch was scheduled for Payback.

On August 24, United States Champion Apollo Crews was scheduled to defend his title against The Hurt Business' Bobby Lashley at Payback. On Raw that night, the two had an arm wrestling match that Crews won when he took a cheap shot by stomping on Lashley's foot.

=== SmackDown ===
The day after SummerSlam, it was announced that new Universal Champion "The Fiend" Bray Wyatt would defend the title against Braun Strowman and Roman Reigns in a no holds barred triple threat match at Payback. Subsequently, on SmackDown, it was revealed that Reigns aligned himself with Paul Heyman.

== Results ==
No.	Results	Stipulations	Times
1^{P}	Apollo Crews (c) defeated MVP by pinfall	Singles match for the WWE United States Championship; The Hurt Business were not allowed to accompany MVP.	06:40
2	Bayley (c) (with Sasha Banks) defeated Asuka by pinfall	Singles match for the WWE SmackDown Women's Championship	11:35
3	The Street Profits (Angelo Dawkins and Montez Ford) (c) defeated Andrade and Angel Garza (with Zelina Vega) by pinfall	Tag team match for the WWE Raw Tag Team Championship	07:50
4	Mandy Rose defeated Sonya Deville by pinfall	No Disqualification Loser Leaves WWE match	10:05
5	Seth Rollins (with Murphy) defeated Dominik Mysterio (with Rey Mysterio) by pinfall	Street Fight	22:35
6	Asuka defeated Sasha Banks (c) (with Bayley) by submission	Singles match for the WWE Raw Women's Championship	11:25
7	Drew McIntyre (c) defeated Randy Orton by pinfall	Singles match for the WWE Championship	20:35
8	"The Fiend" Bray Wyatt defeated Braun Strowman (c) by pinfall	Falls Count Anywhere match for the WWE Universal Championship	12:00
(c) / – the champion(s) heading into the match; P / – the match was broadcast on the pre-show
