= WWE ThunderDome =

Bio-secure bubble for professional wrestling events (2020–2021)

- The WWE ThunderDome logo
- Type: Bio-secure bubble
- Location: Various (see venues and events)
- Owner: WWE
- Established: August 21, 2020; 5 years ago
- Closed: July 12, 2021; 5 years ago
- Current status: Closed
- Website: wwethunderdome.com (Redirects to WWE.com)

The WWE ThunderDome was a bio-secure bubble created by the American professional wrestling promotion WWE. It was launched in August 2020 as a way for professional wrestling fans to attend WWE events virtually during the COVID-19 pandemic. The bubble was a videoconferencing crowd system and arena staging utilized for broadcasts of television shows and pay-per-view/livestreaming events of the promotion's Raw and SmackDown brand divisions. It worked by users signing up days before an event, logging in and joining at their allocated call time to be seen on a screen at the event in real time. It was free of charge to spectate an event.

In its 11-month usage, the ThunderDome was hosted at three arenas, all in Florida, United States. Its first residency was at the Amway Center in Orlando from August 21 – December 7, 2020. Due to the start of the 2020–21 ECHL and NBA seasons, WWE relocated the ThunderDome to Tropicana Field in St. Petersburg, which began on December 11. Due to the start of the 2021 Tampa Bay Rays season, the ThunderDome was then relocated to its final location of the Yuengling Center in Tampa, which began on April 12, 2021. The final ThunderDome-based broadcast aired on July 15, 2021, due to the company's resumption of live touring for Raw and SmackDown, which began on July 16. The period of time that WWE produced shows from the ThunderDome has been referred to as the "ThunderDome Era".

During the first three months, there were over 130,000 entry requests to access the ThunderDome website, with over 650,000 by March 2021. The WWE ThunderDome earned the "Virtual Fan Experience" award at the 2020 SPORTEL Awards, the award for "Best Tech Innovation During the COVID-19 Pandemic" at the 2021 Cynopsis Sports Media Awards, and the award for "New Product or Launch" at the 2021 Cablefax FAXIES Awards. A similar setup called the Capitol Wrestling Center was utilized for WWE's NXT brand from October 2020 to September 2021.

== History ==
The original WWE ThunderDome arena setup that was used at both the Amway Center and Tropicana Field; the setup at Yuengling Center was tighter with the LED screens closer to the ring with additional ones placed on the left side of the entrance stage

At the onset of the COVID-19 pandemic in mid-March 2020, the American professional wrestling promotion WWE moved the majority of its programming for their Raw and SmackDown brands to their WWE Performance Center training facility in Orlando, Florida with no fans in attendance; in late May, the promotion began using Performance Center trainees to serve as the live audience, which was further expanded to friends and family members of the wrestlers in mid-June. On August 17, 2020, WWE announced that they would be relocating to Orlando's Amway Center, where their episodes of Monday Night Raw (and sub-show Main Event), Friday Night SmackDown, 205 Live, and pay-per-view (PPV) and livestreaming events would be broadcast for a long-term period, beginning with the August 21 episode of SmackDown. As with the broadcasts from the Performance Center, these programs were produced behind closed doors but with no in-person spectators. They also featured a larger-scale in-arena production, a bio-secure bubble billed as the WWE ThunderDome, with screens surrounding the ring displaying virtual spectators via videoconferencing (similar to the NBA bubble). While the August 21 episode of SmackDown was their first television episode produced in this manner, SummerSlam just two days later was their first PPV and livestreaming event to be broadcast from the ThunderDome.

WWE's initial residency agreement with the Amway Center expired on October 31, but with the option to extend the contract with a two weeks notice. The contract was extended to November 24. On November 19, WWE announced that the ThunderDome would remain in Florida, but would be relocated to Tropicana Field in St. Petersburg, beginning with the December 11 episode of SmackDown. (Coincidentally, Tropicana Field also used to be called the ThunderDome when it was the home arena of the Tampa Bay Lightning from 1993 to 1996.) This move was also done due to the start of the 2020–21 ECHL and NBA seasons as the Amway Center is the shared home of the Orlando Solar Bears (ECHL) and the Orlando Magic (NBA), with WWE delays leading to the Solar Bears to play their first three weekends of the season on the road. The final ThunderDome show produced from the Amway Center was the December 7 episode of Raw.

The promotion did not announce the length of their residency at Tropicana Field, but it was expected that they would eventually have to leave around March due to the start of the 2021 Tampa Bay Rays season. On March 24, WWE announced that they would relocate to the Yuengling Center, located on the campus of the University of South Florida in Tampa, beginning with the post-WrestleMania 37 episode of Raw on April 12. WWE taped the April 5 and 9 episodes of Raw and SmackDown, respectively, as well as the 2021 WWE Hall of Fame ceremony, the week prior to allow time to move the ThunderDome from Tropicana Field to Yuengling Center before the April 12 broadcast. The April 9 episode of SmackDown, which was taped on April 2, was the final show produced at Tropicana Field. WWE remained at the Yuengling Center until July 9, as the company announced that they would be returning to live touring, starting with the July 16 episode of SmackDown in Houston, Texas, thus ending production of the ThunderDome broadcasts. The final ThunderDome show produced live was the July 9 episode of SmackDown with the final ThunderDome-based broadcast airing as the July 15 episode of Main Event, which was taped on July 6. Additionally, June's Hell in a Cell event was the final PPV and livestreaming event held in the ThunderDome, which also made Hell in a Cell the only PPV and livestreaming event to be produced twice from the ThunderDome. The period of time that WWE produced shows from the ThunderDome has been referred to as the "ThunderDome Era".

On October 4, 2020, at NXT TakeOver 31, WWE debuted a similar setup dubbed the Capitol Wrestling Center for their NXT brand's events—since mid-March, NXT's shows were held behind closed doors at Full Sail University in Winter Park, Florida. The Capitol Wrestling Center was hosted at the WWE Performance Center and had many of the same features as the ThunderDome. The main difference was that the Capitol Wrestling Center included a small crowd of select live fans, who were originally required to wear masks and divided by plexiglass walls, in addition to the virtual fans. The name was also an homage to WWE's predecessor, the Capitol Wrestling Corporation. 205 Live's shows were also moved to the Performance Center following TakeOver 31. The Performance Center would become NXT's permanent home base and by June 2021, nearly all COVID restrictions were lifted with audience capacity expanded and no longer featuring virtual fans. On September 14, 2021, the Capitol Wrestling Center name was discontinued when NXT was relaunched as NXT 2.0, complete with a fully redesigned Performance Center with all COVID restrictions lifted.

=== Staging and production ===
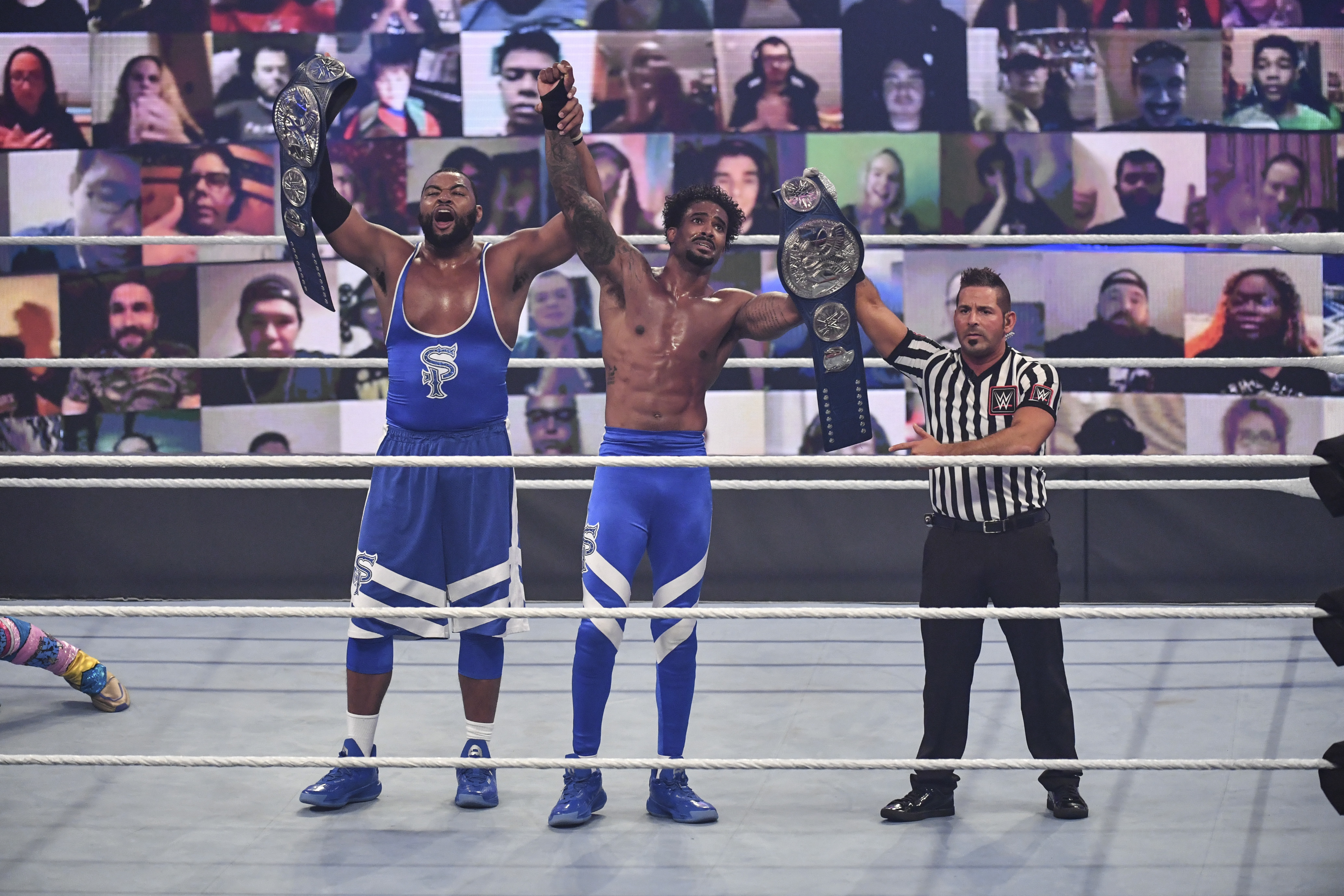
LED boards featuring a virtual audience after a Street Profits match

In creating the ThunderDome, WWE partnered with a team of production companies including Quince Imaging and The Famous Group. Inside the ThunderDome, drones, lasers, pyro, smoke, and projections were utilized to enhance the wrestlers' entrances on a level similar to that of pay-per-view/livestreaming productions before the pandemic. WWE Executive Vice President of Television Production, Kevin Dunn, further noted that the company was able to "do things production-wise that we could never otherwise do" prior to the ThunderDome. Nearly 1,000 LED boards were installed to allow for rows and rows of virtual fans. Arena audio was also mixed with that of the virtual fans' chants. WWE's Senior Vice President of Event Technical Operations, Duncan Leslie, said they used what he called a "virtual audience mix" where they used fake crowd noise in the telecast and could unmute the virtual fans, but there was a slight delay.

It was free of charge for fans to virtually attend the events, though they had to reserve their virtual seat ahead of time. The night of an event, fans joined during their allocated call time. WWE also took measures against fans who violated the terms of service (ToS), such as fans wearing or displaying controversial or offensive material, as well as wearing merchandise of other major professional wrestling promotions. The company immediately removed those violating the ToS from the livestream and banned those individuals from future shows.

== Venues and events ==
=== Venues ===
The following are the venues that hosted the WWE ThunderDome.

Arena	Location	Date of Residency
Amway Center	Orlando, Florida	August 21, 2020 – December 7, 2020
Tropicana Field	St. Petersburg, Florida	December 11, 2020 – April 2, 2021
Yuengling Center	Tampa, Florida	April 12, 2021 – July 9, 2021

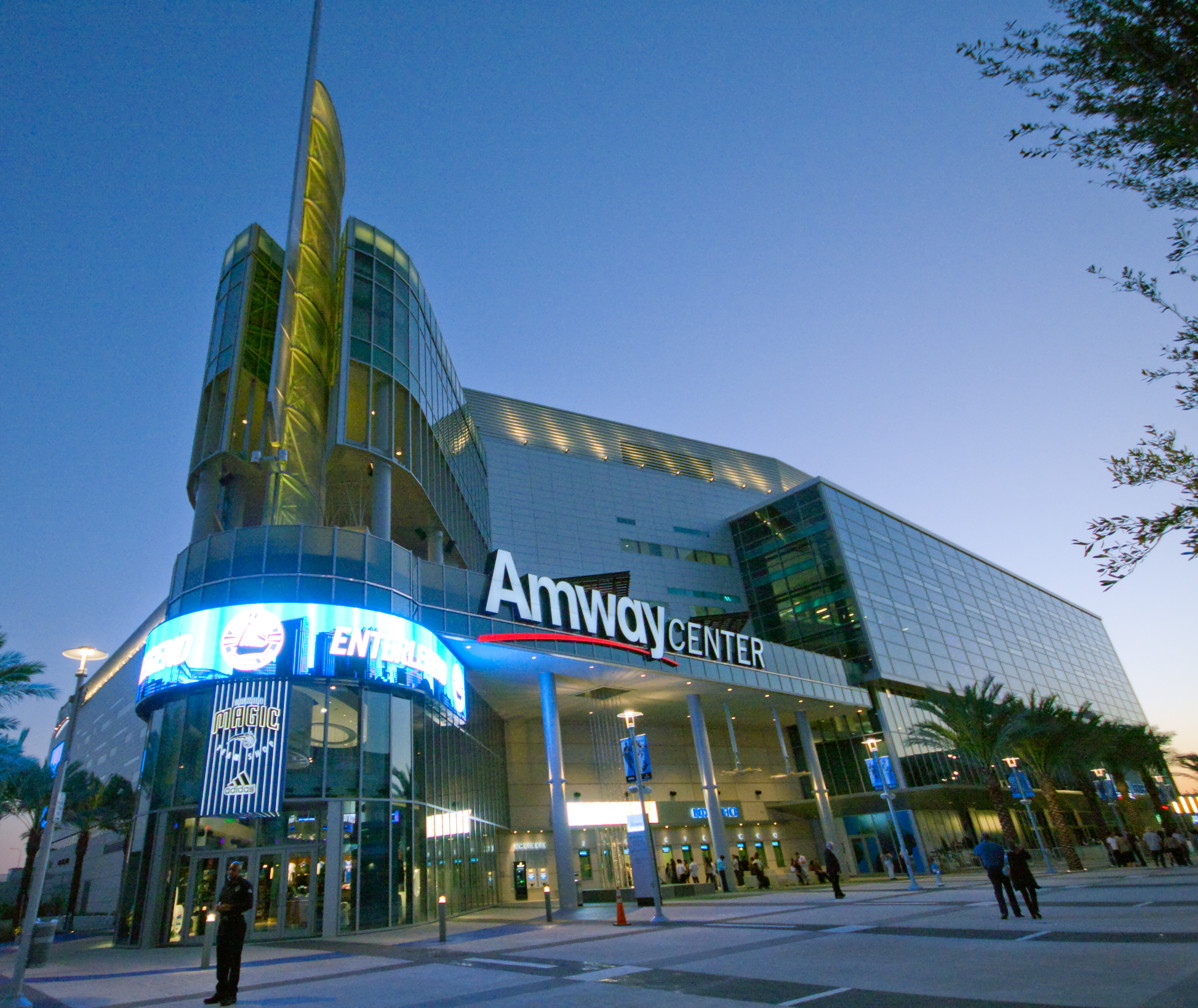
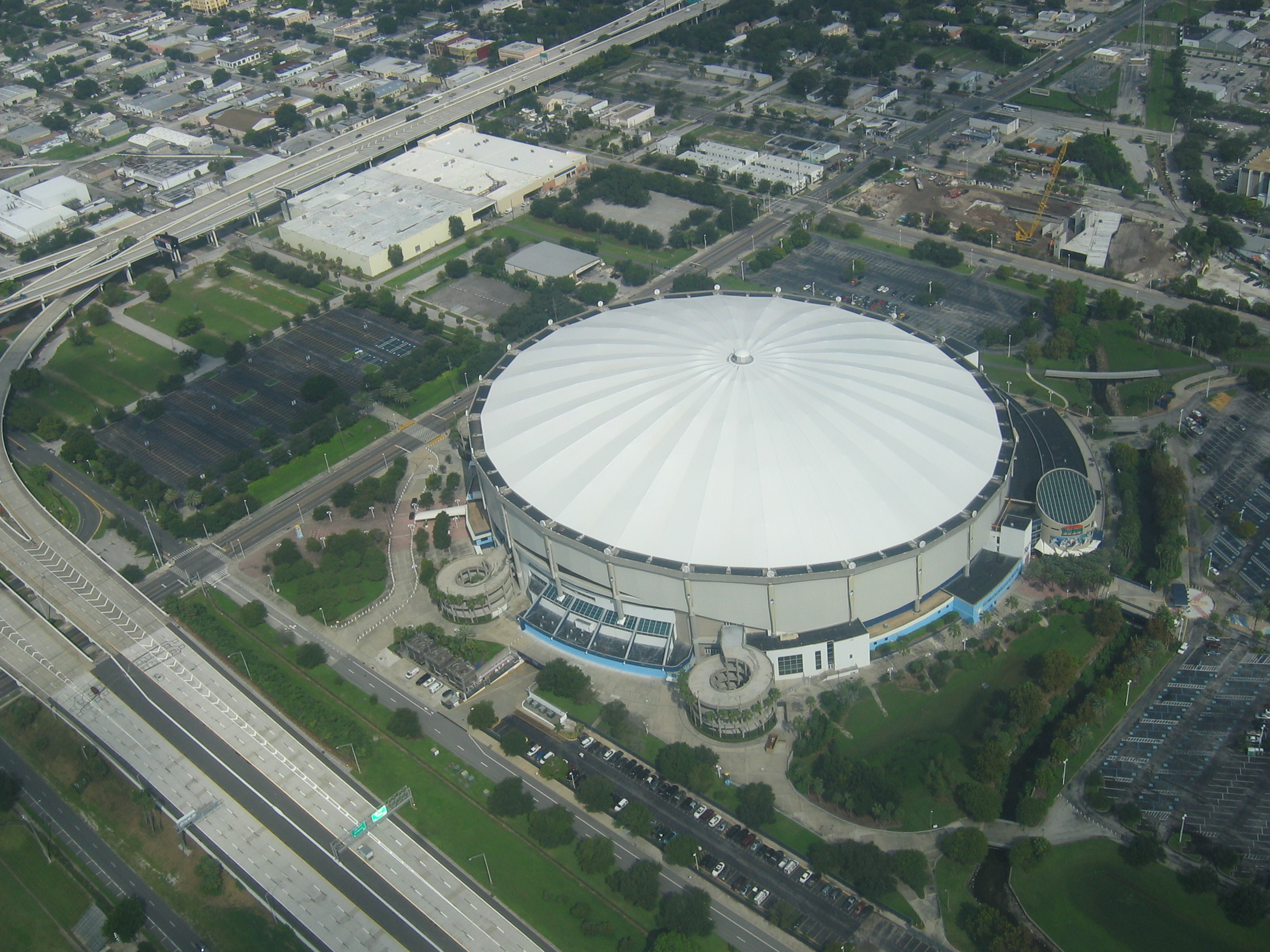
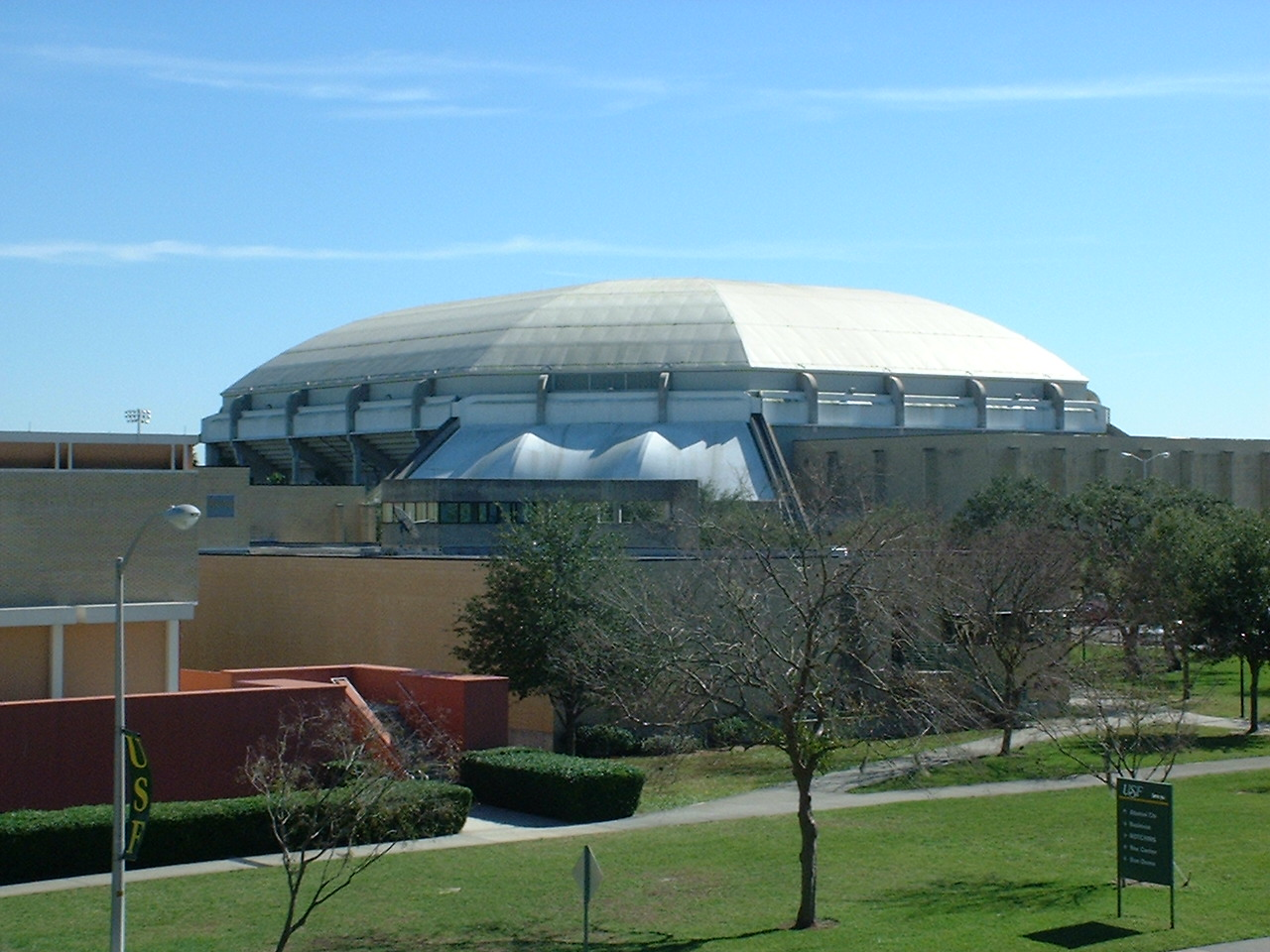
The WWE ThunderDome emanated from three venues in Florida: the Amway Center in Orlando, Tropicana Field in St. Petersburg, and the Yuengling Center on the campus of the University of South Florida in Tampa.

=== Events ===
The following are the events that were held at each venue.

Amway Center
Weekly television shows
Show	Dates
SmackDown	August 21, 2020 – December 4, 2020
205 Live	August 21, 2020 – October 2, 2020
Raw	August 24, 2020 – December 7, 2020
Main Event	August 24, 2020 – December 7, 2020 (aired August 27, 2020 – December 10, 2020)
Television special
Tribute to the Troops	December 6, 2020
Pay-per-view and WWE Network events
Event	Date
SummerSlam	August 23, 2020
Payback	August 30, 2020
Clash of Champions	September 27, 2020
Hell in a Cell	October 25, 2020
Survivor Series	November 22, 2020

Tropicana Field
Weekly television shows
Show	Dates
SmackDown	December 11, 2020 – April 2, 2021 (aired December 11, 2020 – April 9, 2021)
Raw	December 14, 2020 – March 30, 2021 (aired December 14, 2020 – April 5, 2021)
Main Event	December 14, 2020 – March 29, 2021 (aired December 17, 2020 – April 8, 2021)
Television special
Superstar Spectacle	January 22, 2021 (aired January 26, 2021)
Pay-per-view and WWE Network events
Event	Date
TLC: Tables, Ladders & Chairs	December 20, 2020
Royal Rumble	January 31, 2021
Elimination Chamber	February 21, 2021
Fastlane	March 21, 2021
WWE Hall of Fame	March 30 and April 1, 2021 (aired April 6, 2021)

Yuengling Center
Weekly television shows
Show	Dates
Raw	April 12, 2021 – July 6, 2021 (aired April 12, 2021 – July 12, 2021)
Main Event	April 12, 2021 – July 6, 2021 (aired April 15, 2021 – July 15, 2021)
SmackDown	April 16, 2021 – July 9, 2021
Pay-per-view and WWE Network events
Event	Date
WrestleMania Backlash	May 16, 2021
Hell in a Cell	June 20, 2021

== Reception ==
Early reviews of the ThunderDome were largely positive. Pro Wrestling Torch ran a poll on their website, and over 50% of respondents indicated that the ThunderDome was "way better" than the shows produced at the WWE Performance Center, while 23% said it was "a little better." Two-thirds of the respondents also said the ThunderDome exceeded their expectations. Nearly half of the respondents said they were more likely to watch WWE's programming due to the ThunderDome setup. In an early review by John Clark of Wrestle Zone, he said the experience of attending as a virtual fan was "cool" but "forgettable."

In November 2020, WWE Chief Brand Officer Stephanie McMahon said that while ratings had dropped during the company's time at the Performance Center, the ratings did increase with the move to the ThunderDome, although the exact numbers were not revealed. She did note that each ThunderDome show up to that point had 1,000 virtual fans in attendance and that there had been over 100,000 entry requests since launch. During the first three months, there were over 130,000 entry requests to access the ThunderDome website. By January 2021, there were 500,000 registered users. Additionally, 226 countries and territories had been represented, 70% of the virtual spectators had returned multiple times, and each show had 100% full capacity of virtual fans. By March 2021, there had been over 650,000 entry requests.

=== Awards ===
WWE received awards for the WWE ThunderDome as a virtual fan experience as well as for its technological innovation. At the 2020 SPORTEL Awards, the ThunderDome earned top honors in the "Virtual Fan Experience" category. During the 2021 Cynopsis Sports Media Awards, it received the award for "Best Tech Innovation During the COVID-19 Pandemic." At the 2021 Cablefax FAXIES Awards, which "recognize excellence in PR and marketing across the industry," the WWE ThunderDome earned the award for "New Product or Launch."

Year	Award	Category	Result
2020	SPORTEL Awards	Virtual Fan Experience	Won
2021	Cynopsis Sports Media Awards	Best Tech Innovation During the COVID-19 Pandemic	Won
2021	Cablefax FAXIES Awards	New Product or Launch	Won

== See also ==
- 2020 NBA Bubble, a similar mechanism used by the National Basketball Association
