= 1960 in professional wrestling =

1960 in professional wrestling describes the year's events in the world of professional wrestling.

== List of notable promotions ==
Only one promotion held notable shows in 1960.

Promotion Name	Abbreviation
Empresa Mexicana de Lucha Libre	EMLL

== Calendar of notable shows ==
Date	Promotion(s)	Event	Location	Main Event
April	EMLL	4. Aniversario de Arena México	Mexico City, Mexico	
September 23	EMLL	EMLL 27th Anniversary Show	Mexico City, Mexico	Ruben Juarez defeated Ray Mendoza in a tournament final for the vacant Mexican National Light Heavyweight Championship

== Notable events ==
- Wally Karbo and Verne Gagne's Minneapolis Boxing and Wrestling Club break away from the National Wrestling Alliance (NWA) to form the American Wrestling Association (AWA) and created the AWA World Heavyweight Championship.

== Accomplishments and tournaments ==
=== EMLL ===
Accomplishment	Winner	Date won	Notes
Mexican National Light Heavyweight Championship tournament	Ruben Juarez	May 15–29	

== Championship changes ==
=== EMLL ===
NWA World Light Heavyweight Championship
incoming champion - Ray Mendoza
Date	Winner	Event/Show	Note(s)
July 30	Gory Guerrero	EMLL show	

NWA World Middleweight Championship
incoming champion – Ronaldo Vera
Date	Winner	Event/Show	Note(s)
October 13	René Guajardo	EMLL show	

NWA World Welterweight Championship
incoming champion – Karloff Lagarde
No title changes

Mexican National Heavyweight Championship
incoming champion - El Médico Asesino
Date	Winner	Event/Show	Note(s)
June 16	Vacant	N/A	Championship vacated when Médico Asesino died.

Mexican National Middleweight Championship
incoming champion – El Santo
No title changes

Mexican National Lightweight Championship
incoming champion – Juan Diaz
No title changes

Mexican National Light Heavyweight Championship
incoming champion – Espectro I
Date	Winner	Event/Show	Note(s)
Uncertain	Vacated	N/A	Championship vacated for undocumented reasons
May 29	Rubén Juárez	EMLL show	Defeated Ray Mendoza to win the vacant championship

Mexican National Welterweight Championship
incoming champion – Karloff Lagarde
No title changes

Mexican National Tag Team Championship
incoming champion – Tarzán López and Henry Pilusso
No title changes

Mexican National Women's Championship
incoming champion – Uncertain
No title changes

=== NWA ===
NWA World Heavyweight Championship
Incoming Champion – Pat O'Connor
Date	Winner	Event/Show	Note(s)
No title changes

== Debuts ==
- Debut date uncertain:
  - Alfonso Dantés
  - George Steele
  - Gorilla Monsoon
  - Harley Race
  - Karl Von Steiger
  - Pat Barrett
  - El Solitario
  - Uncle Elmer
- September 30:
  - Antonio Inoki
  - Giant Baba
- November 12 – Rocket Monroe
- December 28 – Angelo Mosca

== Retirements ==
- Wild Bill Longson (April 1931-1960)
- Al Mills (April 1931-1960)
- Rito Romero (1942-1960)

== Births ==
- January 1 – Rayo de Jalisco Jr.
- January 3 – Ross Hart
- January 10 – Negro Casas
- January 23 – Leilani Kai
- February 3:
  - Kerry Von Erich(died in 1993)
  - Marty Jannetty
- February 12 – One Man Gang
- February 17 – Shunji Kosugi
- March 2 – Debra Marshall
- March 3 – Ben Bassarab
- March 6 – Paul Van Dale
- March 16 – Kenny Bolin
- March 19 – Moondog Cujo(died in 2009)
- March 22: Jimbo Covert
- March 24 – Barry Horowitz
- April 12 – Tony Anthony / Dirty White Boy
- April 16 – Damian Kane
- April 18 – Vic Steamboat
- April 24 – Lance Von Erich
- April 29 – Paul Roma
- May 11 – Kodo Fuyuki(died in 2003)
- May 14 – "Dr. Death" Steve Williams(died in 2009)
- May 20 – Dale Veasey
- May 23 – Pat Rose
- May 27 – Kelly Kiniski
- June 1 – Brian Adias
- June 2 – Timothy Flowers
- June 10 – Cueball Carmichael
- June 13 – Jacques Rougeau
- June 23 – Súper Ratón
- July 4 – Barry Windham
- July 9
  - Marc Mero
  - Jim Jefferson (died in 2013)
- July 27 – Fidel Sierra
- August 4 – Dean Malenko
- August 6 – Jose Luis Rivera
- August 10 – Brett Sawyer (died in 2023)
- August 11 – Brickhouse Brown (died in 2018)
- August 21 – John Callahan
- August 26 – Gary Jackson
- September 2 – Todd Champion
- September 11 – Road Warrior Animal(died in 2020)
- September 18 – Blue Panther
- September 23 – Kurt Beyer
- September 26 – David Sammartino
- October 1 – Tim Burke(died in 2011)
- October 4 – Bobby Fulton
- October 10 – Soldat Ustinov
- October 16 – Frankie Lancaster
- October 23 – Bubba Monroe (died in 2022)
- October 30 – Roadblock
- November 11 – Dump Matsumoto
- November 16 – John Condrone (died in 2020)
- November 19 – Miss Elizabeth(died in 2003)
- December 9 – Steve Doll(died 2009)
- December 16 – Sid Vicious (died in 2024)
- December 18 – Moondog Splat
- December 27 – Franz Schumann
- December 29 – Mark Madden

== Deaths ==
- January 7 – Jack Claybourne, 49
- March 23 – Raoul Paoli 72
- May 22 – Great Gama 82
- June 16 – Médico Asesino 39
- July 17 – Paul Bowser 74
- December 11 – Tor Yamato 43
