= Zelina Vega =

American professional wrestler (born 1990)

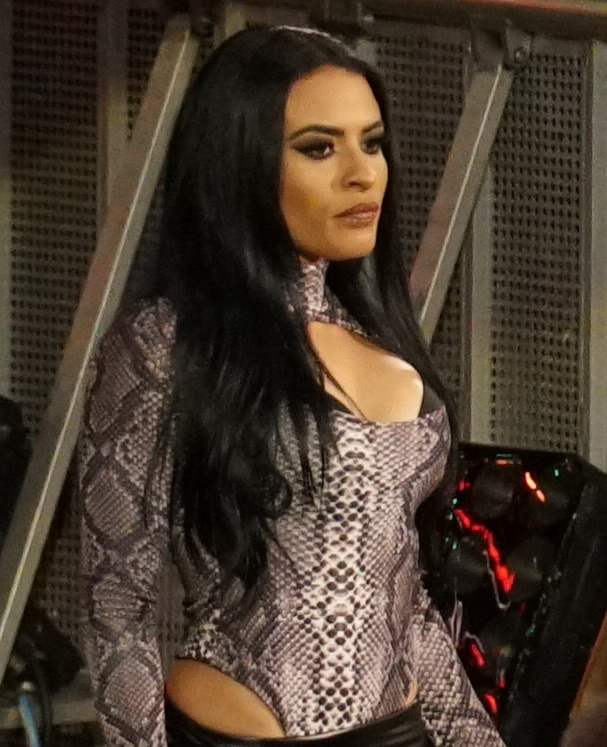
- Vega in 2018

Personal information
- Born: Thea Megan Trinidad; December 27, 1990 (age 35) Queens, New York City, U.S.
- Spouse: Tom Büdgen (m. 2018)
- Relative: Amazing Red (cousin)

Professional wrestling career
- Ring name(s): Divina Fly; Queen Zelina; Rosita; Thea Trinidad; Xelina; Zelina; Zelina Vega
- Billed height: 5 ft 1 in (155 cm)
- Billed from: Queens, New York; Puerto Vallarta, Mexico
- Trained by: Javi-Air; Azrieal; Arturo Beristain; Tony Salazar; WWE Performance Center
- Debut: February 20, 2010

Twitch information
- Channel: theatrinidad
- Years active: 2020–present
- Genres: Gaming; Just Chatting
- Followers: 122K
- Last updated: September 3, 2026

Thea Megan Trinidad Büdgen (born December 27, 1990) is an American professional wrestler. She is performing on the independent circuit under the ring name Xelina. She is best known for her tenure in WWE under the ring name Zelina Vega.

Trinidad performed under the ring name Rosita for Total Nonstop Action Wrestling (TNA), where she worked from 2011 to 2013. She was a part of the Mexican-America stable and was paired with Sarita, winning the TNA Knockouts Tag Team Championship. In 2017, she debuted on WWE's NXT brand under the ring name Zelina Vega, where she predominantly served as the manager of Andrade "Cien" Almas, being called-up to the main roster. WWE released Trinidad in November 2020, but re-signed her less than six months later. During her second stint, she won the Queen's Crown tournament (temporarily changed her name to Queen Zelina) the WWE Women's United States Championship and the WWE Women's Tag Team Championship. During her last months with WWE, she became the manager of her husband Aleister Black until their release in 2026.

== Early life ==
Thea Megan Trinidad was born on December 27, 1990, in the Queens borough of New York City, and is of Afro-Latin Puerto Rican descent. She grew up watching professional wrestling with her father and younger brother Timothy, and was inspired by Rey Mysterio and Lita. Her parents divorced when she and her brother were young. She practiced swimming and baseball at school. When she was 10 years old, her father, Michael Angel Trinidad, was killed in the September 11 attacks; he had worked as a telecom analyst for Cantor Fitzgerald at the World Trade Center, and was on the 104th floor of the North Tower when it collapsed.

Her mother, Monique Ferrer, approached StoryCorps with the story of how she and her husband had met and what she experienced on the day of the attacks with his death, which StoryCorps used to create a short cartoon titled Always a Family as a way of honoring his memory. She has said it was because of her father that she entered the wrestling business. She was featured in an NBC special, titled Children of 9/11, on September 5, 2011. Growing up, she also worked as a counselor on a camp for children that had lost parents on 9/11 and also participated in charitable causes such as Habitat for Humanity with Tuesday's Children after Hurricane Katrina.

== Professional wrestling career ==
=== Early career (2010–2011) ===
At the age of 17, Trinidad began training under Javi-Air, Azrieal, and T. J. Perkins. Trinidad made her professional wrestling debut under the ring name Divina Fly for National Wrestling Superstars (NWS) on February 20, 2010, in Bloomfield, New Jersey, where she competed against Brittney Savage in a losing effort. On the August 21 NWS event, Fly competed against Niya in a losing effort. On October 1 at an NWS event, Trinidad, now under the ring name Snookie Fly, teamed up with Judas Young and Mike Dennis in a losing effort to Brittney Savage and Team Supreme (Corvis Fear and Nicky Oceans) in a mixed-tag-team match.

On February 20, 2010, she made her debut for Women Superstars Uncensored (WSU), under the ring name Divina Fly in a losing effort against Brittney Savage. On June 26, 2010, Divina Fly and Niya, collectively known as The Fly Girls, competed for the WSU Tag Team Championships but lost to the reigning champions, Cindy Rogers and Jana. On September 11, 2010, Divina Fly won a match against newcomer Candy Cartwright with a Fly Cutter.

=== Total Nonstop Action Wrestling (2011–2013) ===
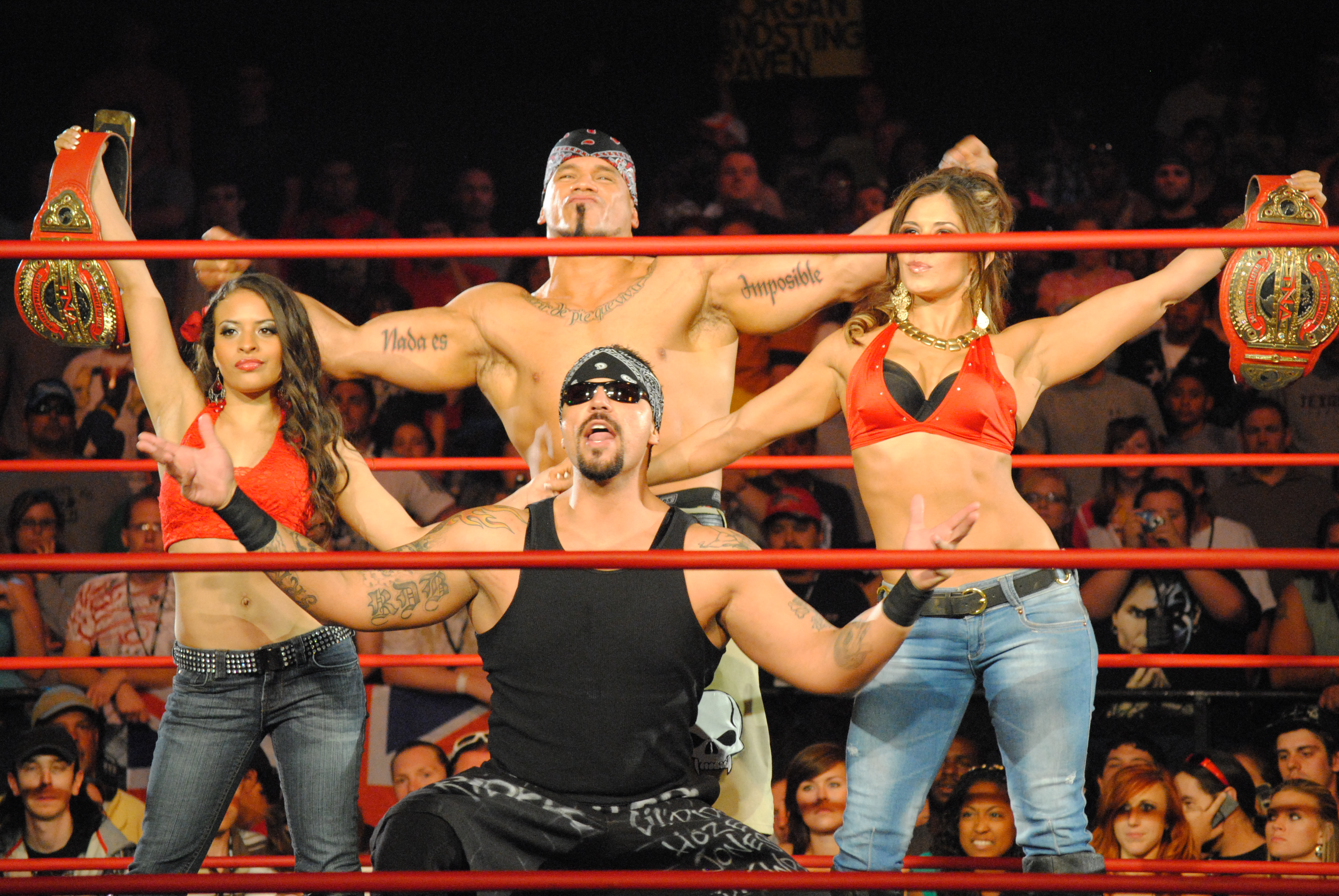
Rosita (left) as part of Mexican America.

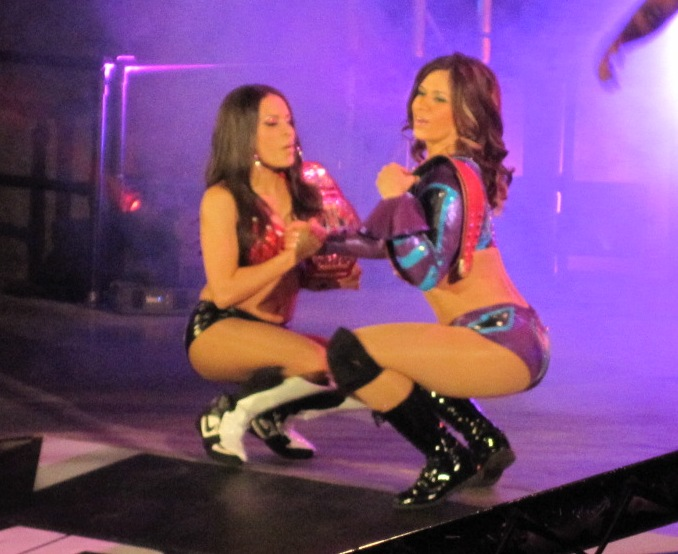
Rosita (left) and Sarita as the TNA Knockouts Tag Team Champions.

After being discovered by Tommy Dreamer, Trinidad wrestled in a tryout dark match at Total Nonstop Action Wrestling's (TNA) Impact! television tapings on January 11, 2011, losing to Angelina Love. On January 27 it was reported that Trinidad had signed a contract with the promotion. On the February 10 episode of Impact!, Trinidad, under the ring name Rosita debuted as the storyline cousin of Sarita in an eight-woman tag team match, where the two of them teamed with Madison Rayne and Tara and defeated Angelina Love, Mickie James, Velvet Sky and Winter, when Rosita pinned Sky.

In February 2011, Rosita and Sarita defeated Angelina Love and Velvet Sky to earn a shot at Love's and Winter's TNA Knockouts Tag Team Championship. On March 13 at Victory Road, Rosita and Sarita defeated Love and Winter to win the TNA Knockouts Tag Team Championship, with Sarita proclaiming that their victory would start a Mexican takeover of TNA. On the following episode of Impact!, the alliance of Rosita, Sarita and Hernandez was named Mexican America. The three of them were then defeated in a six-person street fight by Love, Winter and Matt Morgan. On March 24, the three were joined by Anarquia. In the following weeks Rosita and Sarita successfully defended the Knockouts Tag Team Championship first against The Beautiful People (Angelina Love and Velvet Sky) and then against Madison Rayne and Tara. They made their third successful defense on the June 16 episode of Impact Wrestling, defeating Velvet Sky and Ms. Tessmacher, following outside interference from ODB. Rosita and Sarita lost the TNA Knockouts Tag Team Championship to Ms. Tessmacher and Tara on July 12 at the tapings of the July 21 episode of Impact Wrestling. They received a rematch on August 7 at Hardcore Justice, but were defeated by Tessmacher and Tara. On the March 22, 2012, episode of Impact Wrestling, Rosita and Sarita again failed to recapture the Knockouts Tag Team Championship, when they were defeated by Eric Young and ODB.

On April 19 episode of TNA Impact, Rosita and Sarita teamed up with Madison Rayne and Gail Kim in a losing effort to Brooke Tessmacher, Tara, Velvet Sky and Mickie James. Rosita and Sarita were given another title opportunity on April 15 at Lockdown, but were once again defeated by Eric Young and ODB, this time in a steel cage match. Afterwards, both Rosita and Sarita went inactive from TNA, while Anarquia left the promotion and Hernandez turned face, effectively ending Mexican America. After months of inactivity, it was reported on January 9, 2013, that Trinidad's contract with TNA had expired and she had parted ways with the promotion.

=== Independent circuit (2011–2017) ===
In late August 2011, Rosita traveled to Mexico to attend an event held by the Consejo Mundial de Lucha Libre (CMLL) promotion, for which Sarita regularly works under the ring name Dark Angel. During Rosita's stay in Mexico, she was trained by CMLL trainers, Arturo Beristain and Tony Salazar, and was eventually offered a contract with the promotion, which she, however, could not sign due to TNA's working relationship with rival promotion AAA. Just days later, Rosita appeared on AAA's television program, Sin Límite, promoting a storyline, where wrestlers from TNA were invading the promotion.

On May 14, 2011, Rosita made her in-ring debut for Family Wrestling Entertainment (FWE) at the Meltdown pay-per-view, losing to fellow knockout Winter with Christy Hemme as the special guest referee. Rosita and Winter had three rematches, first on August 20 at Empire City Showdown, the second on November 15 at Fallout and the third on December 17 at Haastility; all were won by Winter. Rosita made her return to the promotion on March 24, 2012, at the Welcome to the Rumble pay-per-view, where she unsuccessfully challenged Maria Kanellis for FWE Women's Championship in a three-way match, after Winter pinned her to become the new champion.

On May 6, 2015, Global Force Wrestling (GFW) announced Trinidad as part of their roster. She debuted for the promotion on June 12, 2015, where she defeated Lei'D Tapa at the first show of the GFW Grand Slam Tour in Jackson, Tennessee. On August 20, 2015, her profile was removed from GFW website.

On July 17, 2015, Trinidad made her debut in Ring of Honor (ROH), managing Austin Aries. On September 2, 2016, she joined Shine Wrestling, debuting on Shine 37, which she ended up defeating Stormie Lee. On September 20, 2016, she made her debut in World Wonder Ring Stardom, defeating Kris Wolf.

=== WWE (2017–2026) ===
==== Managing Andrade (2017–2020) ====
On March 4, 2013, Trinidad took part in a tryout for WWE. She made several brief appearances in the promotion in 2014, including as one of Adam Rose's "rosebuds", and lost a match against NXT Women's Champion Asuka on the October 26, 2016, episode of NXT.

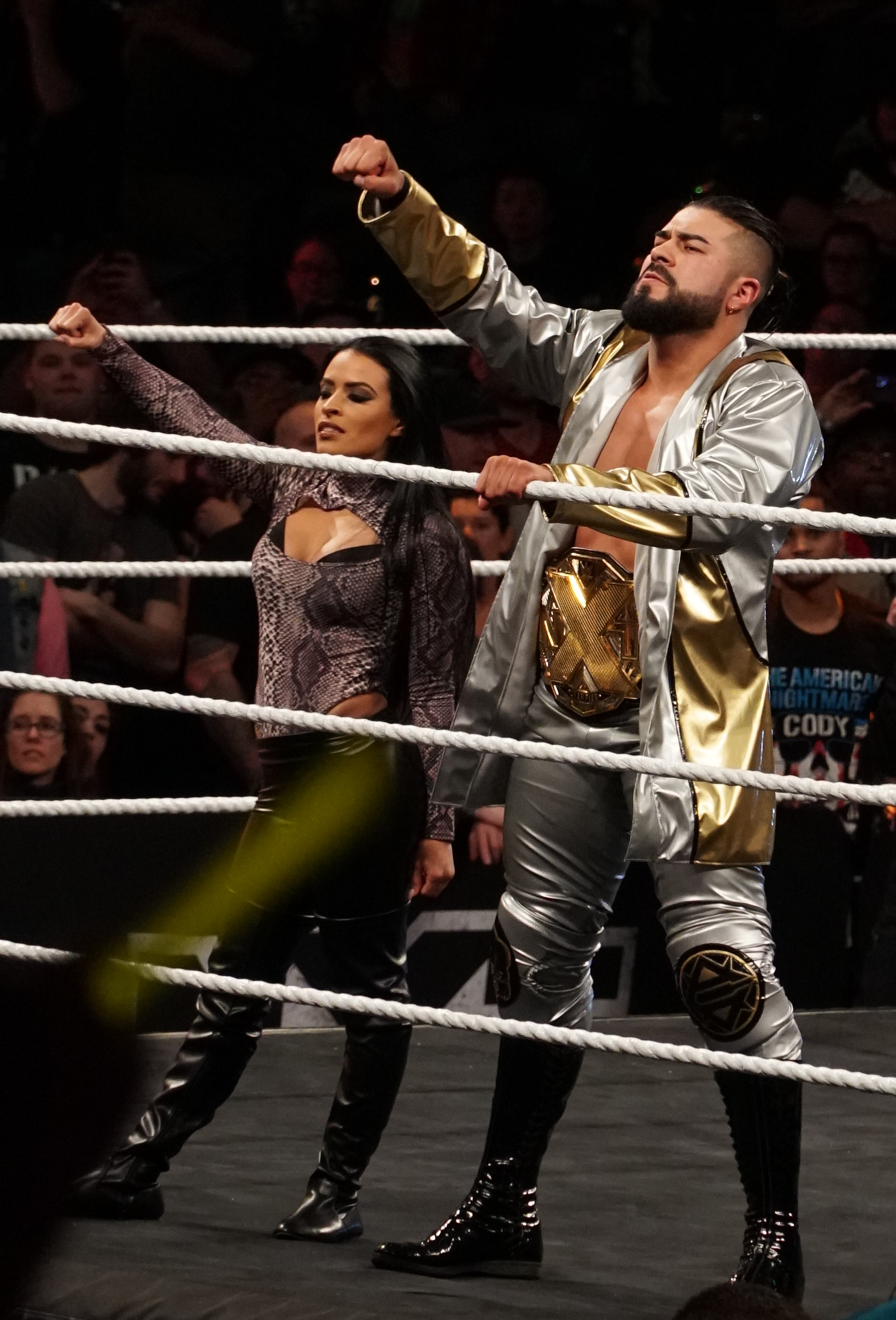
Vega with Andrade "Cien" Almas at NXT TakeOver: New Orleans in April 2018

By June 2017, Trinidad had signed a contract with WWE and began training at the WWE Performance Center. She began to work as the manager of Andrade "Cien" Almas, interfering during his matches. On the April 18 episode of NXT, Vega was accompanied by Almas during her first televised match in which she was defeated by Candice LeRae. This turned out to be Vega's and Almas' last appearances in NXT. On April 17 during the Superstar Shake-up, Vega and Almas were both drafted to the SmackDown brand. On the July 31 episode of SmackDown, Vega had her first match on the brand, defeating Lana. Vega would have matches on PPV events like a tag team match with Almas against Lana and Rusev at SummerSlam, participating in a battle royal at Evolution, or the Women's Battle Royal at WrestleMania 35. Despite Almas and Vega were drafted during the 2019 WWE Superstar Shake-up to the Raw brand, she was moved back to SmackDown days later. Months later, in October, Almas and Vega were drafted back to Raw as part of the 2019 Draft. Vega participated in the women's Royal Rumble match at the namesake pay-per-view on January 26 at #25 but was eliminated by Shayna Baszler.

With Andrade and new tag team partner Angel Garza arguing and fighting each other constantly, Vega appeared to end her association with her clients on the September 14 edition of Raw, interrupting and confronting Asuka after she defeated Mickie James, initiating a feud. The following week, Vega defeated James to earn a title match against Asuka for the Raw Women's Championship at Clash of Champions on September 27, which she lost via submission. As part of the 2020 Draft in October, Vega was drafted to the SmackDown brand. On November 13, 2020, WWE announced that they had released Trinidad from her contract. That same day, Trinidad had tweeted her support for unionization in professional wrestling. It was later reported that the release was due to Trinidad's opposition to WWE "requiring talents to acquiesce control" of their accounts on third-party platforms.

==== Queen Zelina (2021–2022) ====
Nearly eight months after her initial release, Vega returned on the July 2, 2021 episode of SmackDown, where it was announced that she would be competing in the 2021 Women's Money in the Bank ladder match; she made her in-ring return the same night in a loss to Liv Morgan. At the event on July 18, she failed to win the match. On the August 27 episode of SmackDown, she competed in a fatal four-way elimination match to determine the #1 contender for the SmackDown Women's Championship, which was won by Bianca Belair. Vega, with specially designed ring gear, was originally scheduled to wrestle on the September 10, 2021, episode of SmackDown held in Madison Square Garden but her match was ultimately cut for time. Vince McMahon later personally apologized to Vega for this. As part of the 2021 Draft, Vega was drafted to the Raw brand, which took effect on October 22.

Before that, Vega entered the inaugural Queen's Crown tournament, representing SmackDown, where she defeated Toni Storm in the first round and Carmella in the semi-finals. At Crown Jewel on October 21, Vega defeated Raw's Doudrop in the finals to win the tournament and be crowned "Queen"; her first accolade in WWE. On the following episode of Raw, now officially a member of the Raw brand, Vega had a coronation for her victory, where she was adorned with a crown, cape, and scepter, and her ring name was changed to Queen Zelina; she defeated Doudrop in a rematch using her scepter. On the November 8 episode of Raw, she competed in a fatal five-way match to determine the #1 contender to the Raw Women's Championship, which was won by Liv Morgan. She participated in the 5 on 5 Survivor Series elimination match at Survivor Series on November 21, but was eliminated by Toni Storm.

On the following episode of Raw, Zelina and Carmella defeated Rhea Ripley and Nikki A.S.H to win the WWE Women's Tag Team Championship, marking Queen Zelina's first title in WWE. On the January 3. 2022 episode of Raw, they retained the titles against Ripley and A.S.H. in a rematch. At Royal Rumble on January 29, she entered at #7, eliminating Sasha Banks before she was eliminated by Ripley. On the second night of WrestleMania 38 on April 3, Zelina and Carmella lost the titles in a fatal four-way tag team match to Sasha Banks and Naomi, which also involved Liv Morgan and Rhea Ripley and Natalya and Shayna Baszler, ending their reign at 131 days. In May, it was reported that she was out of action due to an in-ring injury which required surgery.

==== Legado Del Fantasma and Latino World Order (2022–2025) ====
After a seven-month hiatus, Vega returned on the October 7, 2022 episode of SmackDown, aligning herself with Legado Del Fantasma and attacking Hit Row. At the Royal Rumble on January 28, 2023, Vega entered the Women's Royal Rumble match at #21. She eliminated Xia Li before being eliminated by Lacey Evans. On the March 10 episode of Smackdown, Vega joined Legado Del Fantasma in helping Rey Mysterio against The Judgment Day, turning face for the first time in her WWE career.

On the March 31 episode of SmackDown, Mysterio reformed the Latino World Order and invited Legado Del Fantasma to join as a token of appreciation for aiding him in his fight against his son, Dominik Mysterio, and The Judgment Day. On the April 21 episode of SmackDown, Vega requested a match against The Judgment Day's Rhea Ripley for the SmackDown Women's Championship at Backlash, which was granted by WWE Official Adam Pearce. Vega was unsuccessful in winning the title from Ripley at Backlash but received a standing ovation from the hometown crowd after the match. Vega defeated Lacey Evans to qualify for the 2023 women's Money in the Bank ladder match on the June 2 episode of SmackDown. Vega and her stablemate Escobar failed to win their respective Money in the Bank ladder matches in the namesake event. On the August 25 episode of SmackDown, as Vega previously defeated the WWE Women's Champion Iyo Sky before winning the title, Vega challenged Sky for the championship, however, was unsuccessful. On the November 10 episode of SmackDown, Escobar defected from LWO and removed Vega, Wilde and Del Toro from Legado del Fantasma the following week. At Night 2 of the 2024 WWE Draft, LWO were drafted to the Raw brand.

==== SmackDown (2025–2026) ====
Vega was transferred to the SmackDown brand as of January 27, 2025, leaving LWO in the process. On the April 25 episode of Smackdown, Vega defeated Chelsea Green to win the WWE Women's United States Championship, thus marking her first singles title win in her career. Vega then retained the title against Green in a rematch on May 24 at Saturday Night’s Main Event XXXIX. On the June 27 episode of SmackDown, Vega lost the title to Giulia, ending her reign at 63 days. Vega attempted to regain the title from Giulia on the August 1 episode of SmackDown, but was unsuccessful.

On the October 10 episode of SmackDown, Vega assisted her real-life husband Aleister Black in defeating Damian Priest in a Last Man Standing match, turning heel for the first time since 2023. On November 2, her ring name was shortened to Zelina. On April 24, 2026 she was released from WWE for a second time.

=== Return to Independent circuit (2026–present) ===
On September 4, 2026, Trinidad, under the name Xelina, made her in-ring debut for House of Glory's (HOG) Fall Out 2026 show, defeating Brittnie Brooks and Shayna Baszler in a triple threat match.

== Filmography ==
Film
Year	Title	Role	Notes
2012	Dorothy and the Witches of Oz	Astoria	
2013	Chilling Visions: 5 Senses of Fear	Chelsea	
2013	Self Storage	Victim	
2013	Army of the Damned	Lawson	
2015	Hope Bridge	Amanda	
2019	Fighting with My Family	AJ Lee	

== Other media ==
Trinidad appeared in the documentary Children of 9/11, and on the first and twentieth anniversaries of the September 11 Memorial Ceremony, she participated in the reading of victim names.

In August 2023, Trinidad alongside New Zealand professional wrestler Cheree Crowley (best known as Dakota Kai), launched a new podcast called ZELVXandCharlieGirl.

=== Acting ===
Trinidad has stated that Dwayne Johnson inspired her to act in films. One of her most notable roles was portraying fellow professional wrestler AJ Lee in the 2019 biographical film Fighting with My Family alongside Florence Pugh (who was portraying Paige).

=== Video games ===
Trinidad appears as a non-playable manager in WWE 2K19 and then as a playable character in WWE Mayhem as a manager, WWE Universe, WWE Champions, WWE SuperCard, WWE 2K20, WWE 2K23 WWE 2K24, WWE 2K25 and WWE 2K26.

Trinidad also features in Street Fighter 6 as an in-game commentator.

== Personal life ==
In 2018, Trinidad married fellow professional wrestler Tom Büdgen, better known as Aleister Black. They reside in Tampa, Florida. She was previously in a six-year relationship with fellow professional wrestler Daniel Solwold Jr., better known as Austin Aries.

On the 10th anniversary of the September 11 attacks, Trinidad spoke about her father who died as a result of the terrorist attacks in an out-of-character interview on TNA's No Surrender pay-per-view.

Trinidad has described herself as a "vegan athlete" and actively promotes her lifestyle on social media and on YouTube. Outside of professional wrestling, Trinidad is a cosplayer and often dresses as characters from anime.

== Championships and accomplishments ==
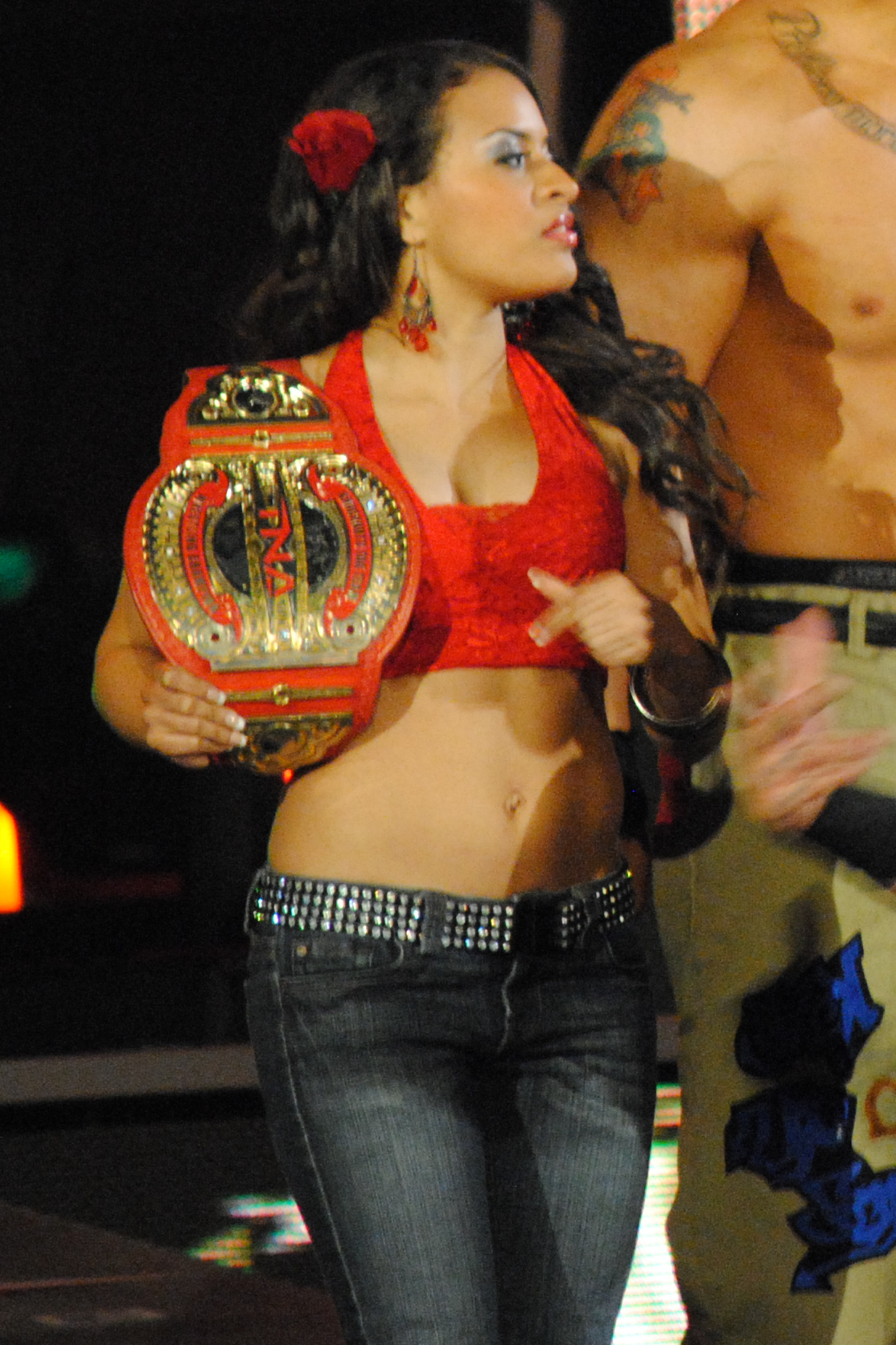
She is a former one-time TNA Knockouts Tag Team Champion.

- Pro Wrestling Illustrated
  - Inspirational Wrestler of the Year (2011)
  - Ranked No. 31 of the top 50 female wrestlers in the PWI Female 50 in 2011
- Total Nonstop Action Wrestling
  - TNA Knockouts Tag Team Championship (1 time) – with Sarita
- Women's Wrestling Fan Awards
  - Best Manager of the Year (2017)
- WWE
  - WWE Women's United States Championship (1 time)
  - WWE Women's Tag Team Championship (1 time) – with Carmella
  - Queen of the Ring (2021, inaugural)
