= André the Giant Memorial Battle Royal =

Professional wrestling match type held by WWE

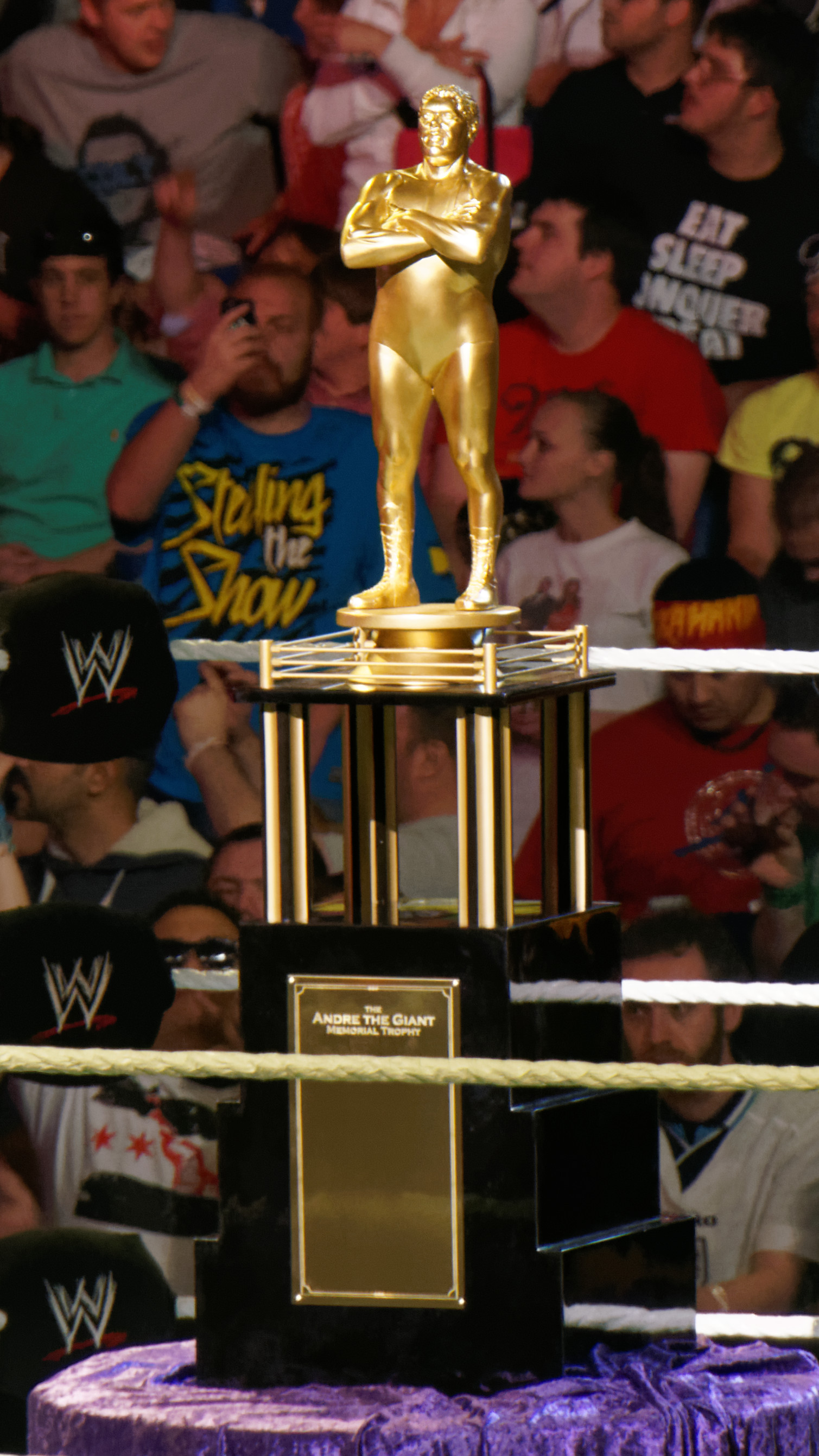
- The André the Giant Memorial Trophy, awarded to the winner of the Battle Royal.
- Founded: 2014
- Organizing body: WWE
- Most recent champion: Royce Keys (2026)
- Tournament format: Battle royal

The André the Giant Memorial Battle Royal is a namesake battle royal held as part of WrestleMania weekend by the American professional wrestling promotion WWE. The winner of the match receives the André the Giant Memorial Trophy. The inaugural battle royal was held at WrestleMania XXX in 2014 and was won by Cesaro. The most recent winner of the 2026 match was Royce Keys ahead of WrestleMania 42.

The match is named in honor of André the Giant, the first WWE Hall of Fame inductee who at over seven feet tall and weighing over 500 pounds was known as "The King of the Battle Royal" due to winning a large majority of such matches he participated in. A women's counterpart, the WrestleMania Women's Battle Royal, was held in 2018 and 2019.

Originally established as an annual battle royal held at either WrestleMania itself or its Kickoff pre-show, the match did not occur at WrestleMania 36 in 2020 due to concerns over the COVID-19 pandemic. It returned in 2021, airing on a special "WrestleMania Edition" of SmackDown the night before WrestleMania 37. The SmackDown prior to WrestleMania has since been established as the start of WrestleMania Weekend with the battle royal becoming a fixture of the special episode.

== History ==
=== André the Giant ===
André the Giant was a French professional wrestler. He was best known for his time in the American professional wrestling promotion WWE. He signed with the company in 1973 when it was still known by its original name of World Wide Wrestling Federation (WWWF), which was renamed to World Wrestling Federation (WWF) in 1979, and he continued performing for the promotion until 1991 (the WWF was renamed to WWE in 2002). Following his death in 1993, André was the inaugural inductee into the promotion's Hall of Fame as the sole inductee for the Class of 1993. At over seven feet tall and weighing 500 pounds, André was known as "The King of the Battle Royal" due to winning a large majority of such matches he participated in.

=== Memorial Battle Royal ===
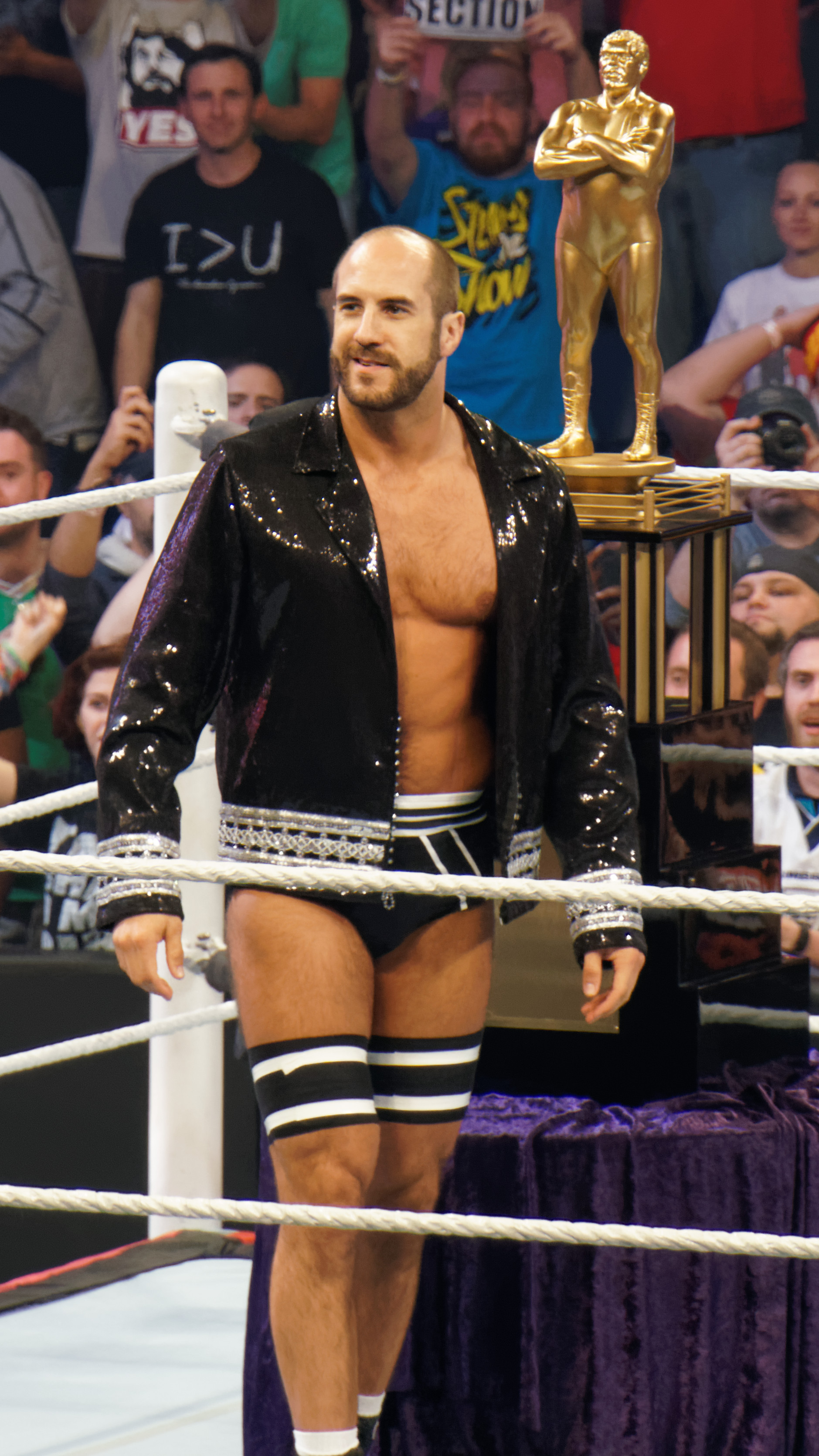
Inaugural winner Cesaro with the André the Giant Memorial Trophy

On the March 10, 2014, episode of Raw, WrestleMania XXX host Hulk Hogan announced the establishment of the André the Giant Memorial Battle Royal. The match was established in honor of André's legacy. It took place at WrestleMania XXX on April 6, with the winner receiving the André the Giant Memorial Trophy, made in the likeness of André. Cesaro won the inaugural match after eliminating Big Show using a body slam, mimicking the famous moment of when Hogan performed a body slam on André at WrestleMania III.

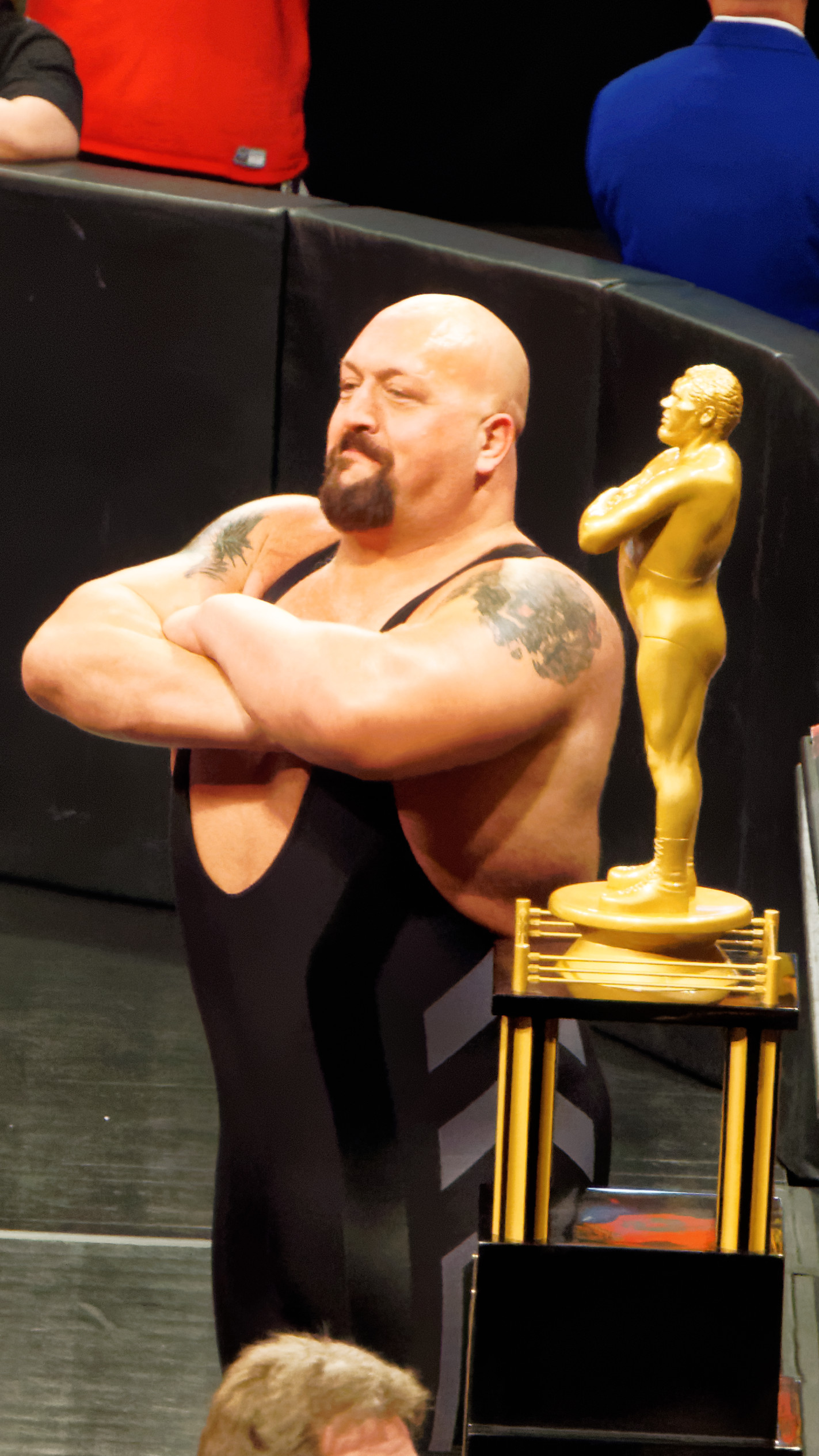
Big Show won the André the Giant Memorial Trophy in March 2015 during the WrestleMania 31 Kickoff Show

At WrestleMania 31 on March 29, 2015, the second annual André the Giant Memorial Battle Royal took place as part of the event's Kickoff pre-show, thus establishing the match as a yearly tradition. Big Show—a wrestler who had been often compared to André due to his similar size and stature and who was originally billed as André's (storyline) son when he debuted in World Championship Wrestling in 1995—won the match by last eliminating Damien Mizdow.

While primarily contested by professional wrestlers, celebrities from other fields began to make appearances in the André the Giant Memorial Battle Royal beginning with the third annual match at WrestleMania 32 in 2016. This match, which occurred on the main card, featured former National Basketball Association player Shaquille O'Neal entering as a surprise participant, confronting Big Show. The match itself was won by Baron Corbin, who last eliminated Kane to win.

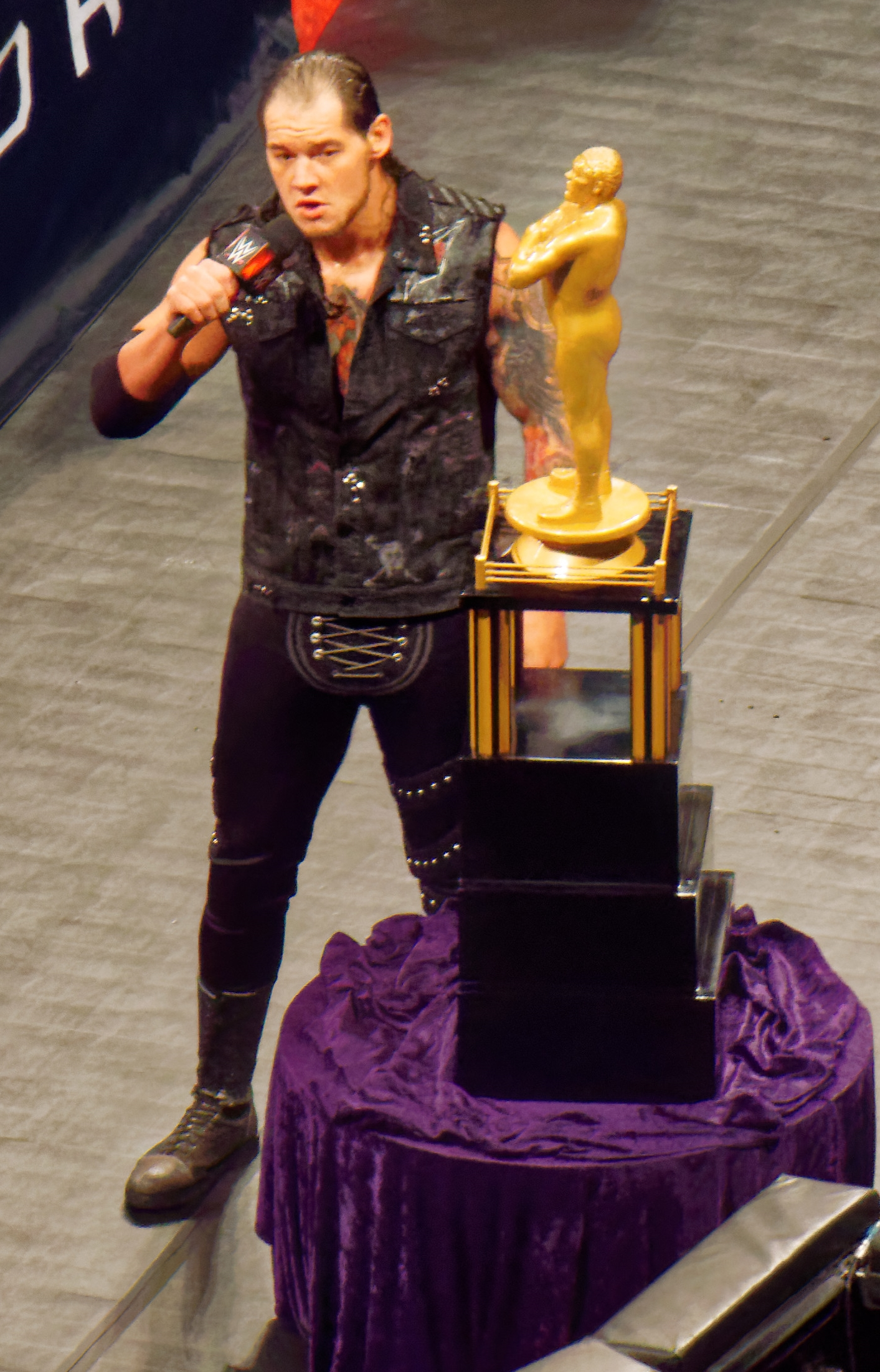
Baron Corbin won the third edition of the battle royal at WrestleMania 32

The following year's match occurred on April 2, 2017, on the WrestleMania 33 Kickoff pre-show. Although not a participant in the match itself, the match did feature a surprise appearance by National Football League player Rob Gronkowski, who assisted his real life friend Mojo Rawley, enabling Rawley to last eliminate Jinder Mahal to win the match.

The fifth annual André the Giant Memorial Battle Royal took place as part of WrestleMania 34's Kickoff pre-show on April 8, 2018. Unlike the past couple of years, this match did not feature any celebrity appearances, but the match was won by Matt Hardy, who last eliminated Baron Corbin to win. Also at WrestleMania 34, a women's version of the match was established, called the WrestleMania Women's Battle Royal.

The sixth annual André the Giant Memorial Battle Royal was held as part of WrestleMania 35's Kickoff pre-show on April 7, 2019. This year's battle royal was unique in that there was a storyline going into the match with the two celebrity guest participants. Prior to the event, comedians Colin Jost and Michael Che of Saturday Night Live began appearing on Raw as part of a storyline with Braun Strowman, which ultimately led to them being scheduled as participants in the match. Strowman ultimately won the match by last eliminating Jost.

The match did not occur at WrestleMania 36 in 2020 due to concerns stemming from the COVID-19 pandemic. The pandemic brought many changes to WWE's programming during that time, and the battle royal was not scheduled so as to limit the number of wrestlers in the ring at the same time. WrestleMania 36 itself, which was WWE's first pay-per-view and livestreaming event affected by the pandemic, was relocated and held behind closed doors at the WWE Performance Center in Orlando, Florida.

On April 1, 2021, WWE announced the return of the André the Giant Memorial Battle Royal. Unlike previous editions of the match, the seventh battle royal was not held at WrestleMania itself. Instead, it aired as part of the April 9 episode of SmackDown, the night before WrestleMania 37, with the episode promoted as WrestleMania SmackDown. The show was pre-taped on April 2, and Jey Uso won the match by last eliminating Shinsuke Nakamura.

The eighth André the Giant Memorial Battle Royal took place on April 1, 2022, during the special WrestleMania SmackDown, which aired live the night before WrestleMania 38. Madcap Moss won the match by last eliminating Finn Bálor.

The ninth André the Giant Memorial Battle Royal took place on March 31, 2023, during the special WrestleMania SmackDown, which aired live the night before WrestleMania 39. Bobby Lashley won the match by last eliminating Bronson Reed.

The 10th edition of the André the Giant Memorial Battle Royal took place during WrestleMania SmackDown on April 5, 2024, at the Wells Fargo Center in Philadelphia, Pennsylvania, the night prior to WrestleMania XL. The prior year's runner up, Bronson Reed, won the 2024 match by last eliminating Ivar.

The 11th edition of the André the Giant Memorial Battle Royal took place during WrestleMania SmackDown on April 18, 2025, at the T-Mobile Arena in Paradise, Nevada, the night prior to WrestleMania 41. Carmelo Hayes won the match by last eliminating Andrade.

The 12th edition of the André the Giant Memorial Battle Royal took place during WrestleMania SmackDown on April 17, 2026. Due to WrestleMania taking place in Las Vegas for a second consecutive year, SmackDown likewise was held at the same venue as the prior year, the T-Mobile Arena in Paradise, Nevada, the night prior to WrestleMania 42. Royce Keys won the match by last eliminating Talla Tonga.

== Reception ==
Writing for PWInsider in 2017, Dave Scherer saw no reason for viewers to care about the André the Giant Memorial Battle Royal, given how winners have been booked and further said: "It's great that talent will get on the show for WrestleMania, but that match hasn't meant anything thus far."

== Winners ==
The battle royal has been held every year since 2014, except in 2020 for WrestleMania 36 due to the COVID-19 pandemic.

No.	Winner	Runner up	WrestleMania Weekend	Location	Date
1	Cesaro	Big Show	XXX	New Orleans, Louisiana	April 6, 2014
2	Big Show	Damien Mizdow	31 (Note: This match took place on the Kickoff Show (pre-show).)	Santa Clara, California	March 29, 2015
3	Baron Corbin	Kane	32	Arlington, Texas	April 3, 2016
4	Mojo Rawley	Jinder Mahal	33	Orlando, Florida	April 2, 2017
5	Matt Hardy	Baron Corbin	34	New Orleans, Louisiana	April 8, 2018
6	Braun Strowman	Colin Jost	35	East Rutherford, New Jersey	April 7, 2019
7	Jey Uso	Shinsuke Nakamura	37 (Note: This match took place on a special WrestleMania themed edition of SmackDown airing the night before WrestleMania.)	St. Petersburg, Florida	April 2, 2021
8	Madcap Moss	Finn Bálor	38	Dallas, Texas	April 1, 2022
9	Bobby Lashley	Bronson Reed	39	Los Angeles, California	March 31, 2023
10	Bronson Reed	Ivar	XL	Philadelphia, Pennsylvania	April 5, 2024
11	Carmelo Hayes	Andrade	41	Paradise, Nevada	April 18, 2025
12	Royce Keys	Talla Tonga	42	Paradise, Nevada	April 17, 2026

== See also ==
- WrestleMania Women's Battle Royal
