= Carmella (wrestler) =

American professional wrestler, dancer and model (born 1987)

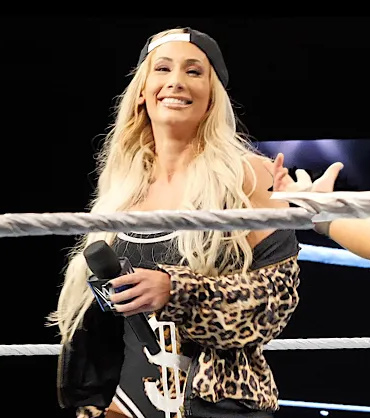
- Carmella in 2019

Personal information
- Born: Leah Van Dale; October 23, 1987 (age 39) Spencer, Massachusetts, U.S.
- Education: UMass Dartmouth (BA)
- Spouse: Corey Graves (m. 2022)
- Children: 2
- Father: Paul Van Dale

Professional wrestling career
- Ring name: Carmella
- Billed height: 5 ft 5 in (1.65 m)
- Billed from: Staten Island, New York
- Trained by: Sara Amato; WWE Performance Center
- Debut: June 2013

Leah Van Dale (born October 23, 1987) is an American professional wrestler, dancer and model. She is best known for her tenure in WWE, where she performed under the ring name Carmella. She is a former WWE SmackDown Women's Champion, WWE Women's Tag Team Champion and WWE 24/7 Champion.

In June 2013, Van Dale signed a contract with WWE and was assigned to their developmental brand NXT in Orlando, Florida. In October 2014, she aligned herself with Enzo Amore and Colin Cassady, becoming their manager. In July 2016, she made her main roster debut on SmackDown.

In June 2017, Carmella became the winner of the inaugural women's Money in the Bank ladder match. In April 2018, she became the first woman in WWE history to successfully cash-in her Money in the Bank opportunity, when she defeated Charlotte Flair to win the WWE SmackDown Women's Championship. In 2019, Carmella won both the WrestleMania Women's Battle Royal and the WWE 24/7 Championship. In November 2021, after being drafted to Raw as part of the 2021 Draft, Carmella formed an alliance with Queen Zelina and the two went on to win the WWE Women's Tag Team Championship.

== Early life ==
Leah Van Dale was born on October 23, 1987, in Spencer, Massachusetts. She is the daughter of Paul Van Dale, a former mixed martial artist and professional wrestler, who worked as a jobber for the World Wrestling Federation (WWF, now known as WWE) in the 1980s and 1990s, making the younger Van Dale a second generation wrestler. Van Dale grew up in Spencer, Massachusetts, where she graduated from David Prouty High School in 2006. She graduated from University of Massachusetts Dartmouth with a Bachelor of Arts in marketing in 2010. Van Dale was a cheerleader for the New England Patriots for three seasons, ending in 2010. She successfully auditioned for the Los Angeles Lakers dance team, appearing as a Laker Girl during the 2010–2011 season.

== Professional wrestling career ==
=== World Wrestling Entertainment/ WWE (2013–2025) ===
==== NXT (2013–2016) ====
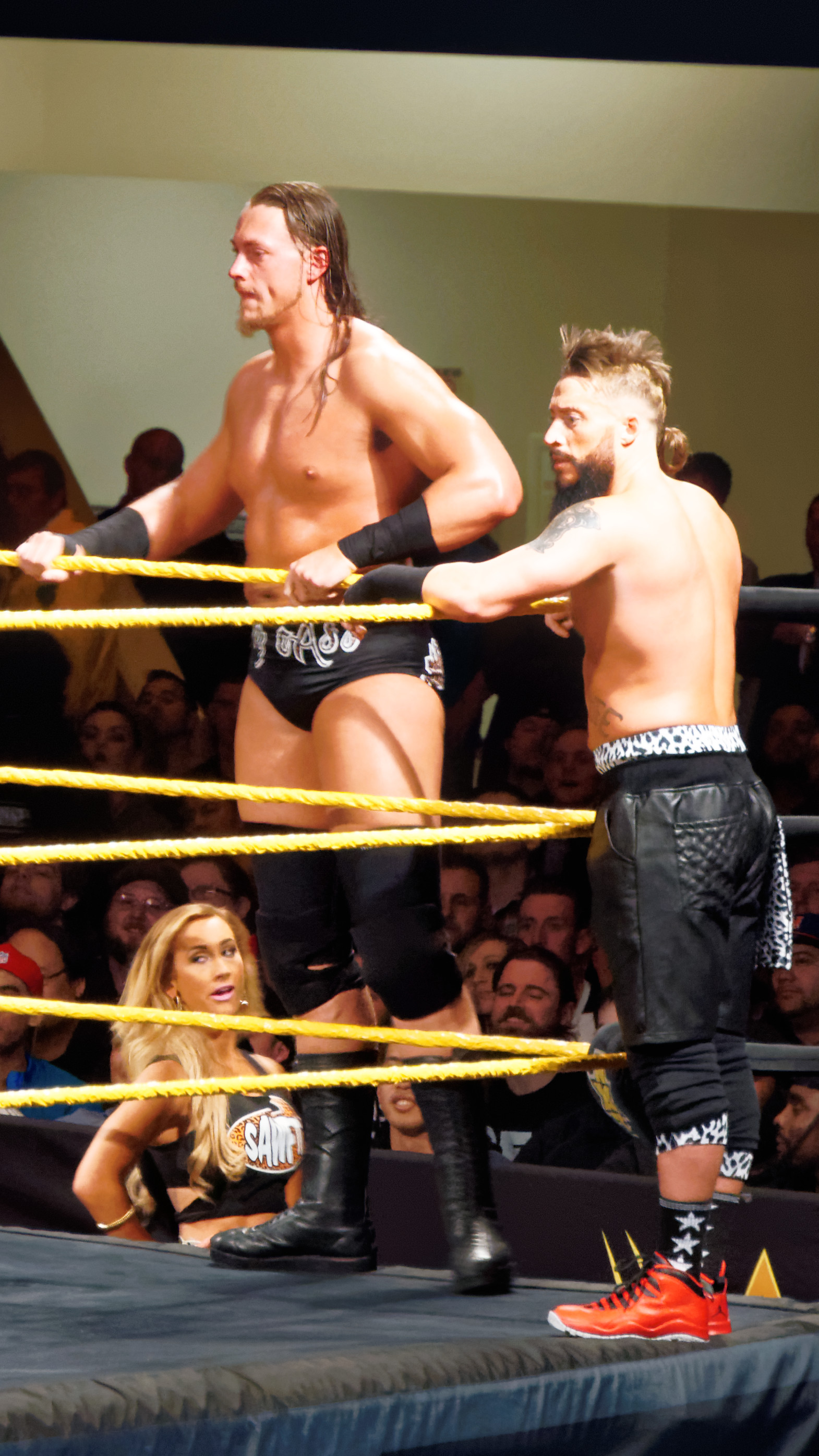
Carmella (down far left) as the manager of Enzo Amore and Colin Cassady in March 2015

Van Dale applied to be part of WWE Tough Enough in 2010, but withdrew from the selection process after being accepted as a Laker Girl and moving to Los Angeles. In June 2013, Van Dale signed a contract with WWE and she was assigned to the company's developmental territory NXT in late September. Later, she adopted the ring name Carmella.

Carmella made her debut on the September 4, 2014, episode of NXT, portraying a hairdresser in a segment with Enzo Amore and Colin Cassidy, where Amore and Cassidy asked for hair remover wax from Carmella, ultimately leading to a mishap where they spilled some wax onto a dog's fur. Two weeks later on NXT, Carmella appeared in another segment with Amore and Cassady at the WWE Performance Center, announcing she had lost her job as a hairdresser due to Amore and Cassidy's actions the week prior and asked for a job at NXT. She made her in-ring debut on the October 16 episode of NXT, wrestling an unnamed opponent whom Amore and Cassady dubbed Blue Pants. Carmella defeated Blue Pants on two occasions, but lost to her on the January 1, 2015, episode of NXT after Amore accidentally caused a distraction. In March, Amore and Cassady began a rivalry with the NXT Tag Team Champions Blake and Murphy while Carmella rejected Blake and Murphy's advances on several occasions. On the May 13 episode of NXT, Carmella was defeated by Alexa Bliss after a distraction by Blake and Murphy. On May 20 at NXT TakeOver: Unstoppable, Bliss attacked Carmella during the NXT Tag Team Championship title match, ensuring the win for Blake and Murphy.

While continuing to manage Amore and Cassady, Carmella began feuding with Eva Marie, which led to a match between the two on the August 26 episode of NXT, which Carmella lost. In January 2016, Carmella won a battle royal to become the number one contender to Bayley's NXT Women's Championship. Carmella unsuccessfully challenged Bayley for the title on February 10. After the match, Eva Marie and Nia Jax attacked the two, which led to a tag team match on the February 24 episode of NXT, which Carmella and Bayley lost. Carmella made her first appearance on WWE's main roster on March 12 at Roadblock, accompanying Amore and Cassady for their match against The Revival for the NXT Tag Team Championship. On the May 25 episode of NXT, Carmella competed in a triple threat match against Alexa Bliss and Nia Jax to determine the number one contender to Asuka's NXT Women's Championship at NXT TakeOver: The End, but she was pinned by Jax.

==== SmackDown Women's Champion (2016–2018) ====
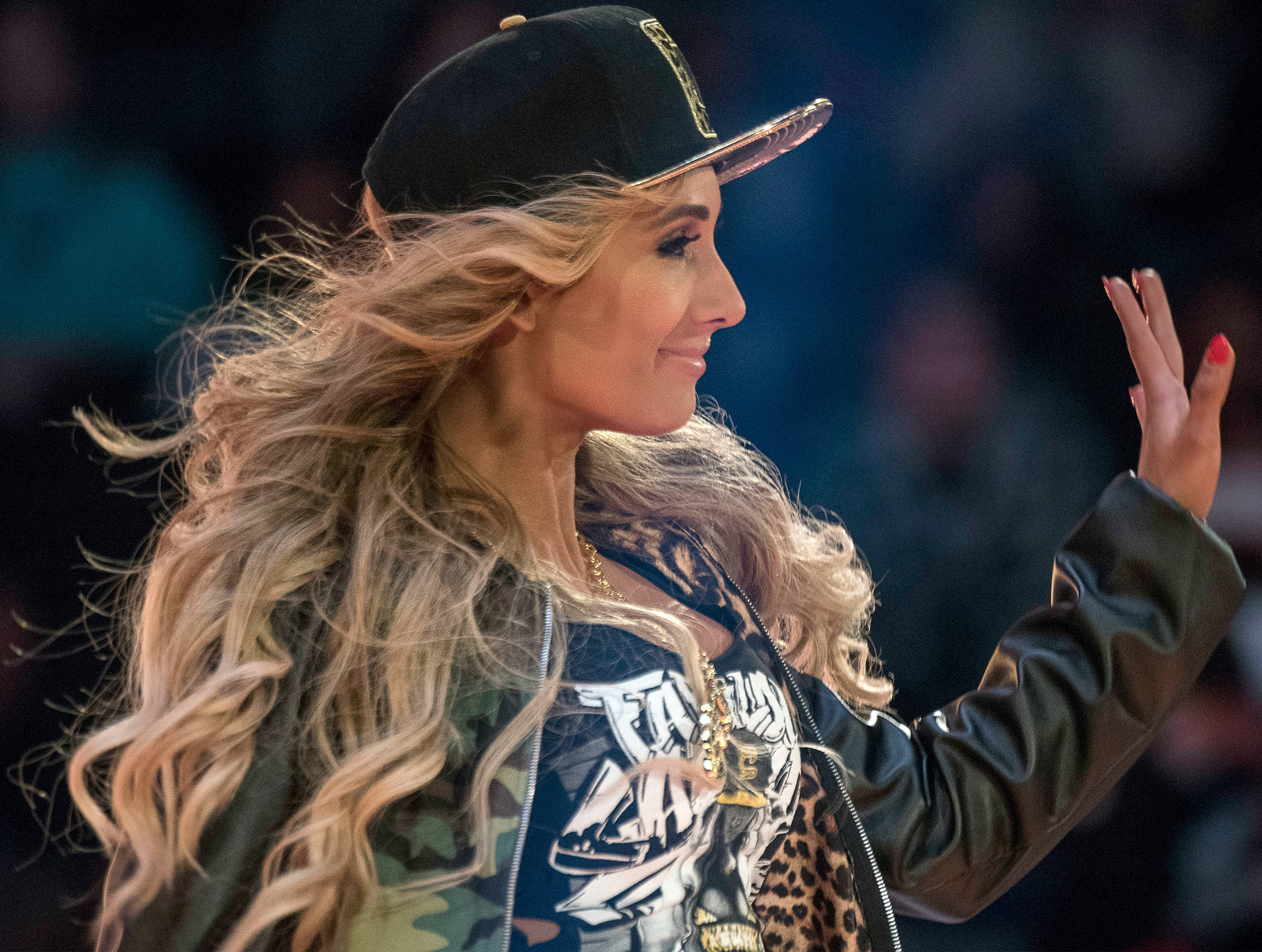
Carmella in December 2016

After being drafted to the SmackDown brand on July 19 as part of the 2016 WWE draft, Carmella made her main roster debut for the brand a week later, confronting the brand female talents before being interrupted by Eva Marie. On the August 9 episode of SmackDown Live, Carmella achieved her first victory on the main roster by defeating Natalya. On August 21 at SummerSlam, Carmella took part in a six-woman tag team match alongside Becky Lynch and Naomi that was won by their opponents Alexa Bliss, Natalya, and Nikki Bella after Bella pinned Carmella. Two days later on SmackDown Live, Carmella attacked Nikki Bella, turning heel in the process and starting a storyline feud between the two. Simultaneously with her feud with Bella, Carmella took part in a six-pack elimination challenge to determine the inaugural SmackDown Women's Champion on September 11 at Backlash. She was the last woman eliminated by Becky Lynch. She was also part of Team SmackDown in the traditional five-on-five Survivor Series match on November 20 at Survivor Series against Team Raw, where she was the first participant eliminated by Alicia Fox. On December 4 at TLC: Tables, Ladders & Chairs, Carmella lost to Nikki Bella in a no disqualification match to end their feud.

Carmella then moved into a storyline with James Ellsworth, professing that she found him "uniquely attractive" and he later started accompanying her to her matches. On April 2, 2017, Carmella made her WrestleMania debut, competing in a six-pack challenge for the SmackDown Women's Championship, but was unsuccessful. In late April, Carmella formed an alliance, dubbed The Welcoming Committee, with Natalya and Tamina, and the three started a feud with Becky Lynch, Charlotte Flair, and Naomi. The two teams faced off in a six-woman tag team match on May 21 at Backlash, where The Welcoming Committee was victorious.

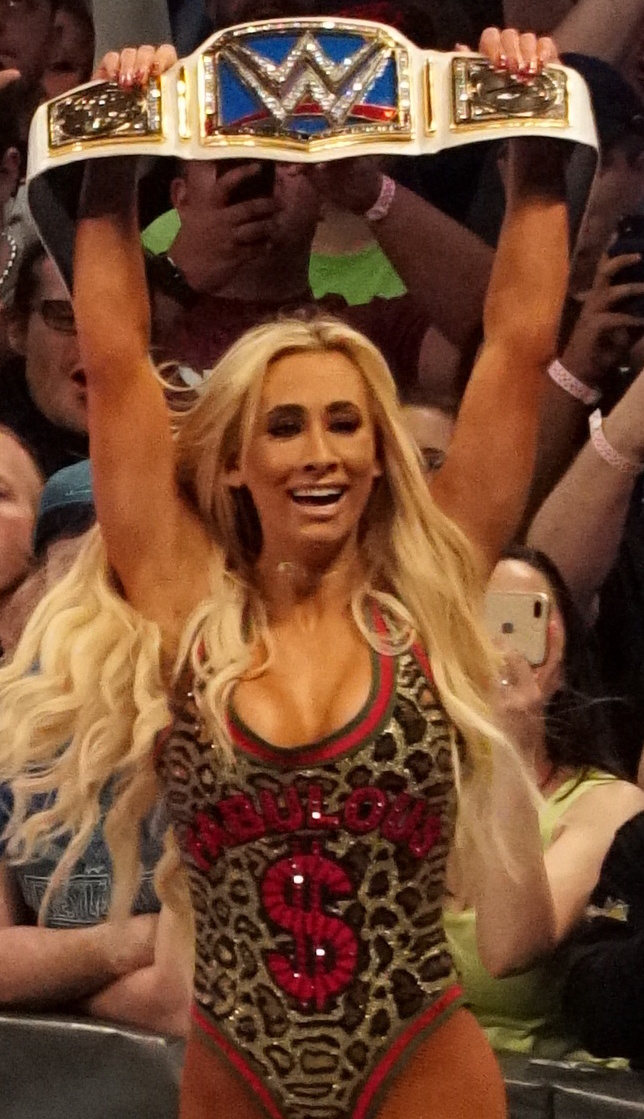
Carmella as the SmackDown Women's Champion

On June 18 at Money in the Bank, Carmella was declared the winner of the inaugural women's Money in the Bank ladder match after Ellsworth obtained the briefcase and dropped it to her. Two days later on SmackDown, Carmella was stripped of the briefcase and a second Money in the Bank ladder match was set by SmackDown General Manager Daniel Bryan. On June 27, Carmella regained the Money in the Bank briefcase after she won the second match with the help of Ellsworth. In November, Carmella ended her association with Ellsworth after he lost to Becky Lynch in an intergender match. On January 28, 2018, at the Royal Rumble, Carmella participated in the first women's Royal Rumble match, where she entered at number 17, lasting over 18 minutes before being eliminated by her former rival Nikki Bella. She then appeared in the first WrestleMania Women's Battle Royal at WrestleMania 34, but was the first woman eliminated from the match by Sonya Deville.

After 287 days (the longest period ever for a wrestler to hold the contract) and a few unsuccessful attempts to cash in her briefcase on Charlotte Flair, Carmella officially cashed in her contract on the April 10 episode of SmackDown Live, after The IIconics (Billie Kay and Peyton Royce) attacked Charlotte Flair, she defeated Flair to win the SmackDown Women's Championship for the first time in her career. In her first title defense, Carmella defeated Charlotte Flair at Backlash. Shortly after, Carmella was placed in a feud with Asuka that ultimately led to a title match between the two at Money in the Bank, which Carmella won after a distraction by the returning James Ellsworth. In a rematch between the two, which took place at Extreme Rules, Carmella again defeated Asuka to retain her title (with Ellsworth suspended in a shark cage). After losing to both Becky Lynch and Charlotte Flair in non–title matches, it was announced that Carmella would face both of them in a triple threat match at SummerSlam on August 19. At the event, Flair pinned Lynch to win the championship, ending Carmella's reign at 131 days. Two weeks later, Carmella received her rematch against Flair but she was unsuccessful in regaining the championship.

==== Alliance with R-Truth (2018–2019) ====
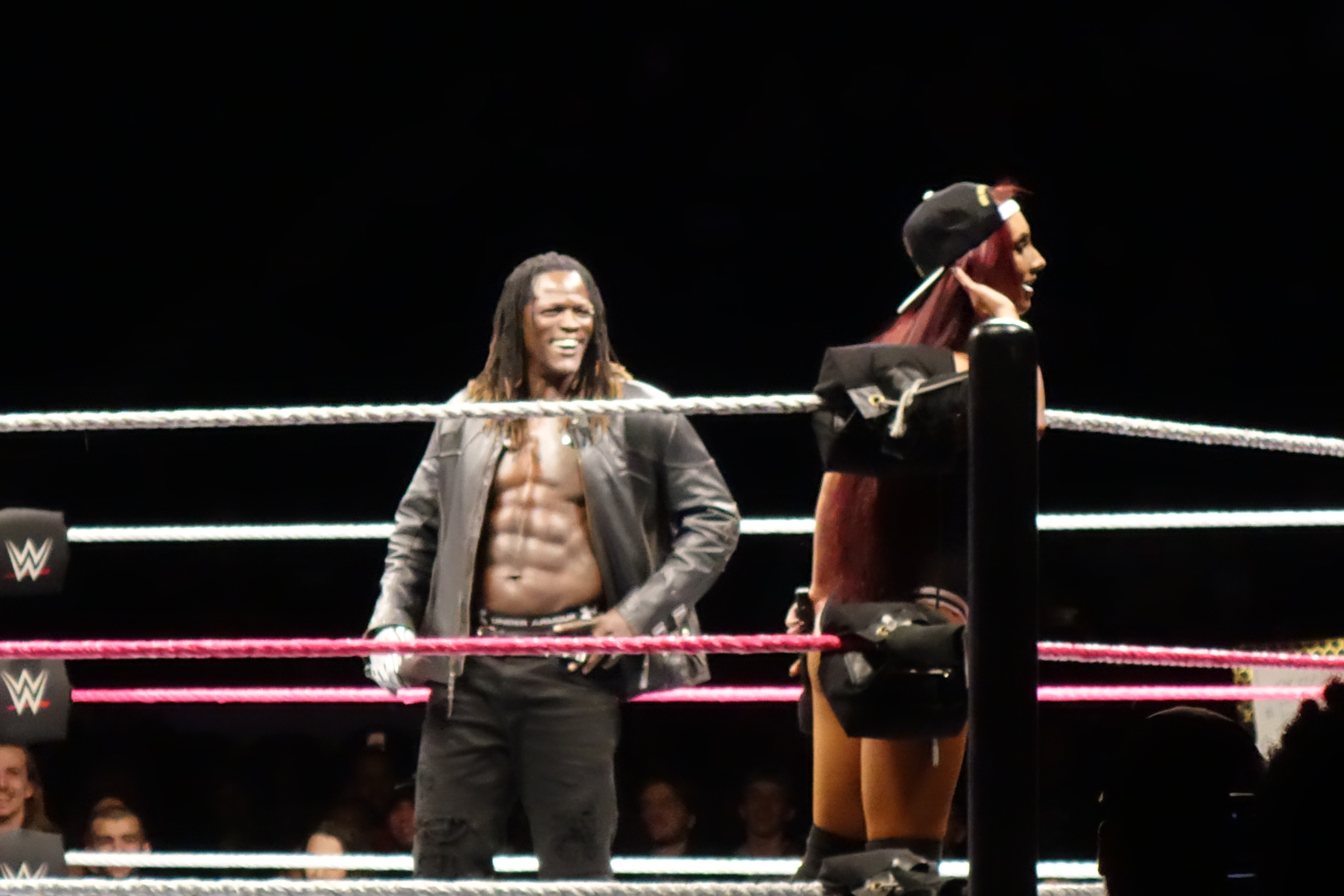
In September 2018, Carmella (right) established a friendship with R-Truth

Towards the end of her title reign, Carmella was placed in a storyline with R-Truth, after the latter implied that he wants a "title match by pinning her" (similar to Becky Lynch and Charlotte Flair's title opportunities). On the September 4 episode of SmackDown Live, Carmella turned face, after she agreed to manage Truth for his match with The Miz to avoid Maryse's interference. Shortly after, Carmella started managing Truth and the two were also announced as tag team partners for the upcoming season two of Mixed Match Challenge, calling themselves "The Fabulous Truth". In November, Carmella once again took part of Survivor Series as part Team SmackDown, where she went on to eliminate Tamina before being eliminated by Bayley.

Carmella and Truth lost the first three matches of Mixed Match Challenge, before defeating Rusev and Lana to qualify for the playoffs, and the team went on to defeat Jeff Hardy and Charlotte Flair in the quarter-finals and previous winners The Miz and Asuka in the semi-finals. In the final of the Mixed Match Challenge that took place at the TLC: Tables, Ladders & Chairs pay-per-view, on December 16, Carmella and Truth defeated Jinder Mahal and Alicia Fox, earning both the number 30 spots for their respective Royal Rumble matches at Royal Rumble. At Royal Rumble, she participated in the Royal Rumble match, but was eliminated by Charlotte Flair.

In February, Carmella started teaming up with Naomi and the two took part of a six-team Elimination Chamber match for the inaugural WWE Women's Tag Team Championship at the namesake pay-per-view, where they were the first team eliminated. On the WrestleMania 35 kickoff show Carmella won the WrestleMania Women's Battle Royal, with lastly eliminating Sarah Logan. In May, Carmella took part in the Money in the Bank ladder match at the namesake pay-per-view, where she once again displayed a knee injury and was ultimately unsuccessful in winning the match. The "knee injury" was used to spark a feud between Carmella, and Fire and Desire (Mandy Rose and Sonya Deville), which ended quickly as Carmella continued to manage R-Truth, who won the WWE 24/7 Championship and she helped him escape and defend it against various competitors. On the September 23 episode of Raw, Carmella rolled-up Truth to capture the 24/7 Championship from him. Her title reign came to an end 11 days later, during SmackDown's 20th Anniversary on October 4, when she was pinned by Marshmello backstage. Later that night, Carmella regained the title from Marshmello in a segment that took place in the parking lot. During the Hell in a Cell, Tamina pinned Carmella to end her second reign with the title at only 2 days, but a few minutes later, Carmella helped Truth defeat Tamina to win the 24/7 Championship. The alliance between Carmella and R-Truth was ended abruptly during the draft, when Truth was drafted to the Raw brand and Carmella remained on the SmackDown brand. On the November 8 episode of SmackDown, Carmella and Dana Brooke defeated Fire and Desire to qualify as part of Team SmackDown at Survivor Series, but they lost to Team NXT at the event.

==== Untouchable (2020–2022) ====
On January 26, 2020, at the Royal Rumble event, Carmella participated in the annual Royal Rumble match, entering at number 27 and lasting a little over six minutes, before she was eliminated by Shayna Baszler. After racking up some wins against the likes of Sonya Deville and Mandy Rose, in February, Carmella earned herself a title match for the SmackDown Women's Championship but came up short against Bayley. Throughout the next two months, she aligned herself with Dana Brooke, and the two eventually challenged Alexa Bliss and Nikki Cross for the WWE Women's Tag Team Championship, however, they were unsuccessful in capturing them. In May, after defeating Mandy Rose in a qualifying match, she participated in her third ever Money in the Bank ladder match at the eponymous pay-per-view, however, she failed to win the briefcase.

In September, vignettes began airing on SmackDown hyping the arrival of a mystery woman. Six weeks later, on the October 2 episode of SmackDown, Carmella revealed herself as the mystery woman and began using the new mantra of "Untouchable", along with a new theme song. After a five month hiatus, she made her first appearance on the show on the November 6 episode, where she attacked Sasha Banks following her title defense against Bayley, thus turning heel. Towards the end of the year, the two continued to cut promos and attack each other, which eventually led to a match for the SmackDown Women's Championship at the TLC: Tables, Ladders & Chairs event. At the event, on December 20, Carmella faced Banks for the title in a losing effort.

Carmella would team up with Billie Kay at WrestleMania 37 to participate in a Tag Team Turmoil match to determine the number one contenders against Nia Jax and Shayna Baszler for the WWE Women's Tag Team Championship, but were unsuccessful in the match. Carmella then faced both members of the Riott Squad individually, and beat them both. She then proclaimed herself "The Most Beautiful Woman in All of WWE". She would then have 3 opportunities for the SmackDown Women's Championship against Bianca Belair, one on the July 16 episode of SmackDown, one on the July 23 episode, and one at a house show in Louisville, Kentucky, but during all three of them, she would be unsuccessful in capturing the title. Carmella was then scheduled to be Sasha Banks' replacement for SummerSlam against Bianca Belair, but was then attacked by a returning Becky Lynch. Carmella lost to Liv Morgan at the Extreme Rules kickoff show.

As part of the 2021 Draft, Carmella was drafted to the Raw brand. In October, Carmella entered the Queen's Crown tournament, where she defeated Liv Morgan in the first round, but lost to Zelina Vega in the semi-finals. As part of her gimmick, Carmella began using a protective face mask, that assistants would provide at ringside. On the November 22 episode of Raw, Carmella and Queen Zelina defeated Nikki A.S.H and Rhea Ripley to win the WWE Women's Tag Team Championship. On night two of WrestleMania 38, Carmella and Zelina lost the titles to Naomi and Sasha Banks in a fatal four-way tag team match, which also included the team of Liv Morgan and Rhea Ripley, as well as the team of Natalya and Shayna Baszler. The following night on Raw, Zelina would blame Carmella for their loss at WrestleMania, which led to Zelina attacking Carmella, thus ending their alliance.

==== Hiatuses and departure (2022–2025) ====
On August 6, Carmella suffered an injury during a live event. Carmella returned on the January 30, 2023, episode of Raw, with her previous gimmick which she used until 2020. The following week on Raw, Carmella defeated Candice LeRae, Mia Yim, and Piper Niven in a fatal four-way match to qualify for the women's Elimination Chamber match at the namesake pay-per-view. At the event, Carmella failed to win the match after she was last pinned by Asuka. Following the March 13 episode of Raw, Carmella went on hiatus from in-ring action due to her real-life pregnancy. On February 21, 2025, it was reported by Fightful that Carmella’s contract had expired and is no longer with WWE, ending her near twelve-year tenure with the company. Carmella had previously stated that she was recovering from post pregnancy complication, drop foot.

== Other media ==
Carmella made her video game debut as a playable character in WWE 2K17 and appeared in WWE 2K18, WWE 2K19, WWE 2K20, WWE 2K Battlegrounds, WWE 2K22, WWE 2K23, WWE 2K24 and WWE 2K25.

Carmella joined Total Divas as a main cast member for the show's seventh season in June 2017. Despite being a guest in the eighth season, Carmella returned to the show as a series regular in the ninth season, which premiered in October 2019. The season featured Carmella's real-life relationship with Matthew Polinsky (better known as WWE commentator Corey Graves).

In 2019, Van Dale appeared on Ron Killings' 2019 single "Run It".

On June 11, 2020, Van Dale and Polinsky launched a weekly podcast called Bare With Us, where the two discuss different issues regarding relationships including issues within their own. It is Van Dale's first podcast as a host and Polinsky's second (along with WWE After the Bell, which he hosts as Corey Graves).

== Personal life ==
Van Dale was in a relationship with fellow wrestler William Morrissey, better known as Big Cass in WWE.

In 2019, she began a relationship with fellow WWE employee Matthew Polinsky, better known as Corey Graves. The two got married on April 7, 2022. On October 31, 2022, she revealed on her Instagram account that she had an ectopic pregnancy, which resulted in a miscarriage. The couple have two children.

Van Dale is a certified fitness instructor and a personal trainer. She is a lifelong fan of professional wrestling, and idolized Miss Elizabeth as a child.

On February 3, 2020, Van Dale launched her own wine label called Capo Cagna.

== Filmography ==
Year	Title	Role	Notes
2015	WWE Breaking Ground	Herself	7 episodes
2018	Celtic Warrior Workouts	Herself	episode 49
2018	My Son/Daughter is a WWE Superstar	Herself	Episode: “Carmella”
2015–2019	Total Divas	Herself	Guest (seasons 4, 6 & 8); Main cast (seasons 7 & 9)
2019	Total Bellas	Herself	Episode: "Bellas Are Back in Action" & "Bellas and the City"
2019	The Beach Bum	Samantha	
2019-2022	Table for 3	Herself	2 episodes
2019	Wild ‘n Out	Herself	Episode: “WWE Carmella and R-Truth/Sofi Tukker”
2019	Celebrity Page	Herself	
2017-2020	Ride Along	Herself	3 episodes
2022	Corey & Carmella	Herself	Main cast
2023	Wheel of Fortune	Herself	Celebrity Contestant Partner: 1 Episode
2023–2025	Tamron Hall	Herself	3 episodes

== Discography ==
=== As featured artist ===
List of singles as featured artist
Title	Year	Album
"Run It" (Ron Killings featuring Leah Van Dale and J-Trx)	2019	Non-album single

== Championships and accomplishments ==
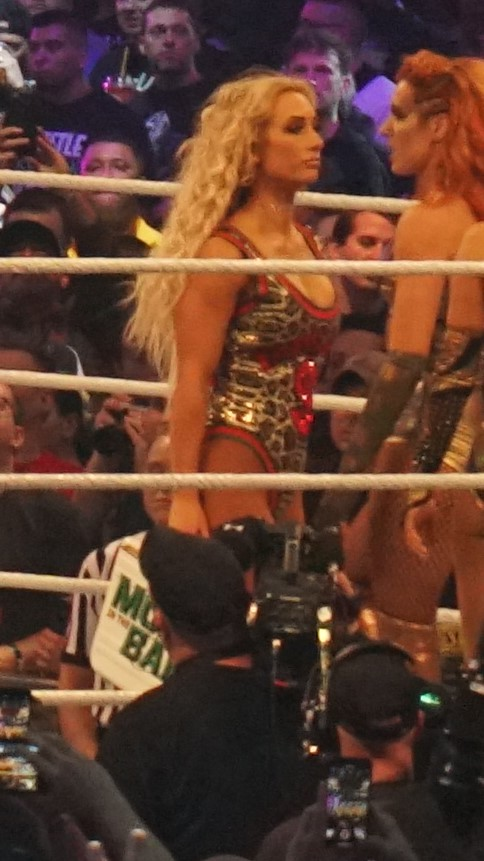
Carmella with the Money in the Bank briefcase in 2017

- Guinness World Records
  - World record: Longest time to hold the WWE Money in the Bank briefcase
- Pro Wrestling Illustrated
  - Ranked No. 7 of the top 100 female singles wrestlers in the PWI Women's 100 in 2018
  - Ranked No. 93 of the top 150 female singles wrestlers in the PWI Women's 150 in 2021.
- Women's Wrestling Fan Awards
  - Most Improved Wrestler of the Year (2018)
- WWE
  - WWE 24/7 Championship (4 times)
  - WWE SmackDown Women's Championship (1 time)
  - WWE Women's Tag Team Championship (1 time) – with Queen Zelina
  - Mixed Match Challenge (Season 2) – with R-Truth
  - Women's Money in the Bank (2017) (Note: Carmella won the Money in the Bank ladder match at Money in the Bank, but due to the controversial finish at the event she was stripped of the briefcase two days later. A rematch took place on the June 27 episode of SmackDown Live, where Carmella won, officially becoming the inaugural winner of the women's Money in the Bank ladder match. However, WWE recognizes Carmella as a two-time Money in the Bank winner.)
  - WrestleMania Women's Battle Royal (2019)

== Notes ==
Preceded by None (first)	Mrs. Money in the Bank; 2017	Succeeded by Alexa Bliss
