= Paul Van Dale =

American professional wrestler

Personal information
- Born: Paul Vandale; March 6, 1960 (age 66) Massachusetts, U.S.

Professional wrestling career
- Ring name: Paul Van Dale
- Billed height: 6 ft 0 in (1.83 m)
- Debut: 1980s
- Retired: circa 1990s

Paul Vandale (born March 6, 1960) is a former American professional wrestler, mixed martial artist and boxer. He is the father of Carmella. Van Dale grew up in Spencer, Massachusetts, where he graduated from David Prouty High School. Van Dale worked for the World Wrestling Federation in the late 1980s to early 1990s.

== Professional wrestling career ==
Van Dale made his debut in the World Wrestling Federation on August 23, 1988 when he lost to the Big Boss Man on Superstars of Wrestling. He would work as a jobber for the WWF from 1988 to 1995. Worked against Razor Ramon, Shawn Michaels, Mr. Perfect, Owen Hart, Jimmy Snuka and Diesel. His last match in WWF was teaming with Tim McNeany losing to the Blu Brothers on August 15, 1995 for Superstars. He had 11 total televised matches.
