= Patrick Ricard (American football) =

American football player (born 1994)

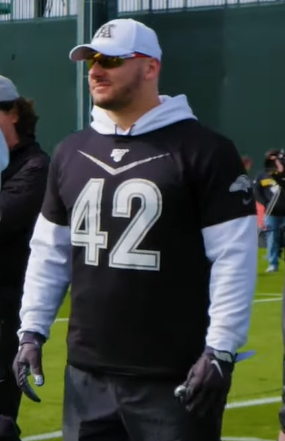
- Ricard at the 2020 Pro Bowl

No. 45 – New York Giants
- Position: Fullback
- Roster status: Active

Personal information
- Born: May 27, 1994 (age 32); Spencer, Massachusetts, U.S.
- Listed height: 6 ft 3 in (1.91 m)
- Listed weight: 300 lb (136 kg)

Career information
- High school: David Prouty (Spencer, Massachusetts)
- College: Maine (2012–2016)
- NFL draft: 2017: undrafted

Career history
- Baltimore Ravens (2017–2025); New York Giants (2026–present)

Awards and highlights
- First-team All-Pro (2024); 2× Second-team All-Pro (2023, 2025); 6× Pro Bowl (2019–2022, 2024, 2025); Third-team All-American (2016); 2× First-team All-CAA (2015, 2016)

Career NFL statistics as of Week 10, 2026
- Rushing yards: 22
- Rushing average: 2.0
- Receptions: 50
- Receiving yards: 324
- Tackles: 19
- Sacks: 1.0
- Touchdowns: 8
- Stats at Pro Football Reference

Patrick Ricard (born May 27, 1994), nicknamed "Pancake Pat", is an American professional football fullback for the New York Giants of the National Football League (NFL). He played college football for the Maine Black Bears. Ricard was originally signed by the Baltimore Ravens as an undrafted defensive end in 2017 and played both fullback and defensive end for the first three seasons of his career before becoming an offense-only player during the 2020 season. He spent nine years with the team before signing with the Giants in March 2026.

As of the 2025 NFL season, Ricard has been selected to six Pro Bowls and has been selected to two NFL All-Pro teams, once as a first-team All-Pro and once as a second-team All-Pro.

== Early life ==
Ricard played high school football at David Prouty High School in Spencer, Massachusetts, and was named the Central Massachusetts Division II Defensive MVP twice.

== College career ==
Ricard played for the Maine Black Bears of the University of Maine from 2013 to 2016 as a defensive lineman. He was redshirted in 2012. He played in all 13 games in 2013, recording 19 solo tackles, 40 tackle assists, 1 sack, 2 pass breakups and 1 forced fumble. Ricard was named College Sports Journal Football Championship Subdivision (FCS) Second Team All-Freshman. He played in 10 games, starting 9, in 2014, totaling 19 solo tackles, 27 tackle assists, 4.5 sacks, 6 pass breakups and 1 blocked kick. He played in 10 games, all starts, in 2015, recording 25 solo tackles, 28 tackle assists, 7 sacks, 2 pass breakups, 3 forced fumbles. Ricard earned First Team All-Colonial Athletic Association (CAA) and Eastern College Athletic Conference (ECAC) Division I FCS Second Team All-Star honors. He played in 11 games, all starts, in 2016, totaling 25 solo tackles, 25 tackle assists, 5.5 sacks, 1 pass breakup and 1 blocked kick. He garnered First-team All-CAA, ECAC Division I FCS First-team All-Star, STATS FCS Third-team All-American and New England Football Writers Division I All-New England Team recognition. Ricard played in 44 games during his college career, recording 208 total tackles, 18 sacks, 11 pass breakups, 3 forced fumbles, 1 fumble recovery and 2 blocked kicks. He majored in economics while at the University of Maine.

== Professional career ==
Ricard was rated the 30th best defensive tackle in the 2017 NFL draft by NFLDraftScout.com.

Pre-draft measurables
Height	Weight	Arm length	Hand span	Wingspan	40-yard dash	20-yard shuttle	Three-cone drill	Vertical jump	Broad jump	Bench press
6 ft 3 3/8 in (1.91 m)	300 lb (136 kg)	32 1/8 in (0.82 m)	10 1/8 in (0.26 m)	6 ft 5 7/8 in (1.98 m)	5.03 s	4.55 s	7.52 s	33.5 in (0.85 m)	8 ft 10 in (2.69 m)	33 reps
All values from Maine Pro Day

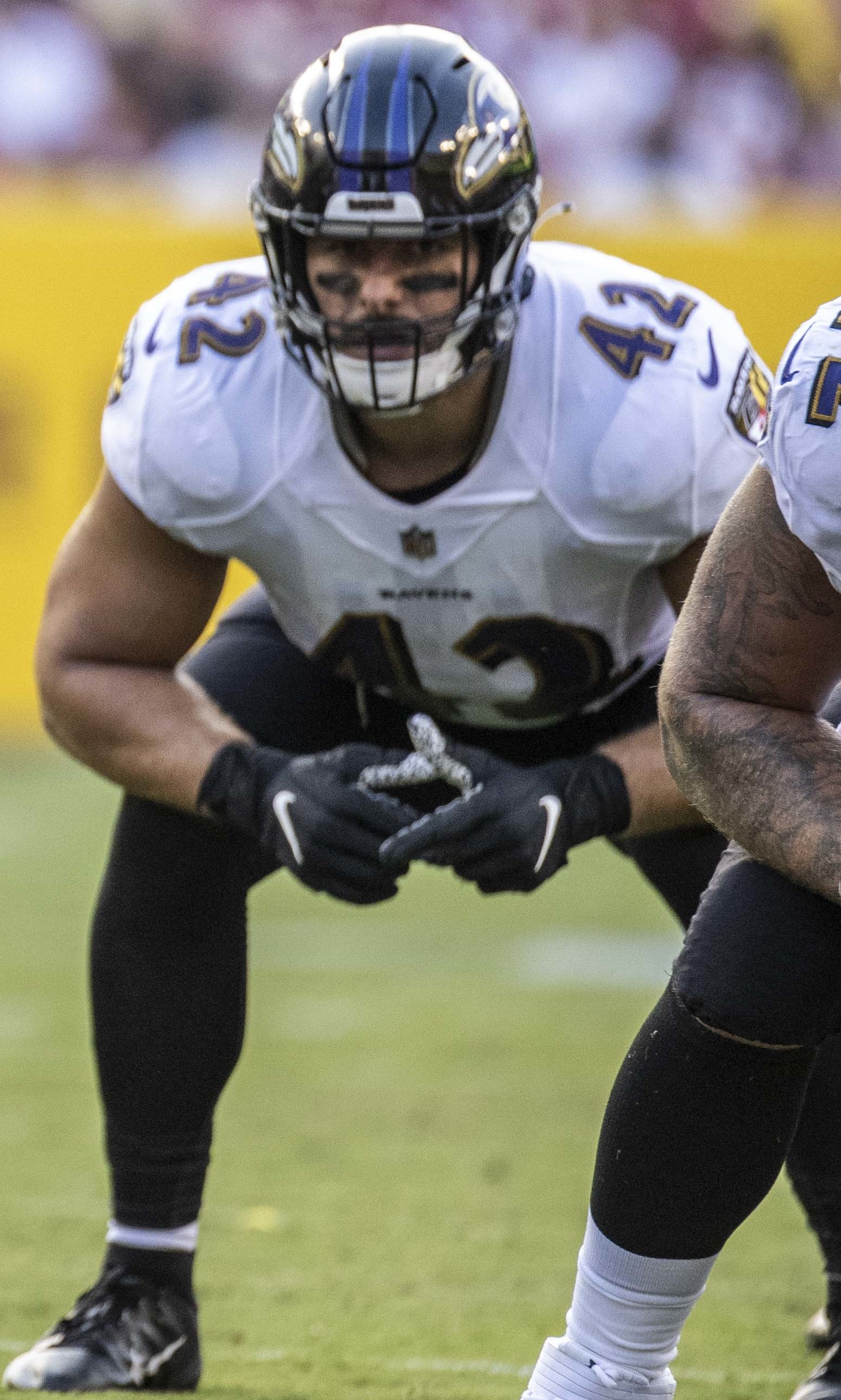
Ricard lined up at fullback during the 2021 preseason

=== Baltimore Ravens ===
==== 2017 ====
After going undrafted, Ricard signed with the Baltimore Ravens on May 5, 2017. During the offseason, he spent time practicing on both offense and defense with the Ravens. During the preseason, he played defensive end and fullback. Ricard would replace veteran Kyle Juszczyk, who had signed with the San Francisco 49ers during free agency in the 2017 offseason, as the Ravens' fullback. He made the 53-man roster as the only fullback on the team. In Week 8 against the Miami Dolphins, he recorded a one-yard reception for the first catch of his NFL career. In Week 13 against the Detroit Lions, he recorded a three-yard reception for his first professional touchdown.

==== 2018 ====
In his second season, Ricard did not record any rushing or receiving statistics on offense. He recorded 4 tackles (one tackle for a loss) and a quarterback hit on defense. He played in 10 and started 2 games in his second season, playing 96 snaps on offense, 140 snaps on defense, and 45 snaps on special teams.

==== 2019 ====
In Week 1 of the 2019 season against the Dolphins, Ricard caught a one-yard touchdown pass, his lone touchdown of the season, from Lamar Jackson in a 59–10 blowout victory. In Week 10 against the Cincinnati Bengals, Ricard strip sacked Ryan Finley, his first sack and forced fumble of his career, with the ball being picked up by Tyus Bowser and returned 33 yards for a touchdown. The Ravens routed the Bengals 49–13. On December 3, 2019, Ricard signed a two-year contract extension with the Ravens through the 2021 season. Nine days later in Week 15 against the New York Jets, Ricard partially blocked a 49-yard field goal attempt by Sam Ficken in a 42–21 win. On offense, Ricard finished the regular season with eight catches for 47 yards and a touchdown. On defense and special teams, he had nine tackles, one sack and forced fumble, one pass breakup, and the aforementioned blocked field goal. He was selected to his first Pro Bowl. Ricard played 342 offensive snaps, 140 defensive snaps, and 102 special teams snaps during the 2019 season.

==== 2020 ====
In 2020, Ricard did not record any snaps on defense for the first time in his professional career. Ricard was placed on the reserve/COVID-19 list by the Ravens on November 27, 2020, and activated on December 7, 2020. On January 6, 2022, Ricard suffered a knee injury and was placed on Injured Reserve. In 2020, Ricard had 1 rushing attempt for -1 yards and 9 receptions on 12 targets for 45 yards and a touchdown.

==== 2021 ====
In 2021, Ricard recorded 4 rushing yards on 2 attempts and caught 8 out of 13 targets for 63 yards and a touchdown.

==== 2022 ====
On March 21, 2022, Ricard signed a three-year contract extension with the Ravens. In 2022, Ricard would record a career-high 7 rushing attempts for 16 yards and a career high 11 receptions for 74 yards along with a tackle, which was the first tackle he had recorded since the 2019 season, his last season of regularly playing both offense and defense.

==== 2023 ====
In 2023 Ricard recorded 5 catches for 52 yards and a touchdown. In the offensive system of new Ravens' offensive coordinator Todd Monken, Ricard saw an increase in playing time at tight end and played a higher number of snaps at tight end than he did at fullback.

==== 2024 ====
In Week 4 of the 2024 NFL Season, Ricard scored a touchdown after recovering a fumble against the Buffalo Bills in a 35-10 win for the Ravens. He scored a receiving touchdown against the Denver Broncos during a 41-10 win in Week 9 on a three-yard reception.

==== 2025 ====
On March 11, 2025, Ricard re-signed with the Ravens on a one-year contract. He suffered a calf injury in training camp that kept him out of the first 6 games of the season, returning in week 7. On December 23rd he was named to his 6th Pro Bowl.

=== New York Giants ===
On March 12, 2026, Ricard signed a two-year deal with the New York Giants, making him the highest paid fullback in the league.

== NFL career statistics ==
Legend
**Bold**	Career high

=== Offensive statistics ===
Year	Team	Games		Rushing					Receiving						Fumbles	
Year	Team	GP	GS	Att	Yds	Avg	Lng	TD	Tgts	Rec	Yds	Avg	Lng	TD	Fum	Lost
2017	BAL	16	0	0	0	0.0	0	0	4	4	12	3.0	6	**2**	0	0
2018	BAL	10	2	0	0	0.0	0	0	0	0	0	0.0	0	0	0	0
2019	BAL	16	7	0	0	0.0	0	0	11	8	47	5.9	10	1	0	0
2020	BAL	15	10	1	-1	-1.0	-1	0	12	9	45	5.0	11	1	**1**	**1**
2021	BAL	13	11	2	4	2.0	2	0	**13**	8	63	7.9	22	1	0	0
2022	BAL	17	**16**	**7**	**16**	2.3	**5**	0	**13**	**11**	**64**	6.7	19	0	0	0
2023	BAL	17	9	0	0	0.0	0	0	7	5	52	**10.4**	**28**	1	0	0
2024	BAL	17	6	0	0	0.0	0	0	5	3	22	7.3	14	1	0	0
2025	BAL	11	5	1	3	**3.0**	3	0	2	1	8	8.0	8	0	0	0
2026	NYG	9	6	0	0	0.0	0	0	3	1	1	1.0	1	0	0	0
Career		141	72	11	22	2.0	5	0	68	50	324	6.5	28	7	1	1

=== Defensive statistics ===
Year	Team	Games		Tackles						Fumbles				Interceptions					
Year	Team	GP	GS	Cmb	Solo	Ast	Sck	Sfty	TFL	FF	FR	Yds	TD	PD	Int	Yds	Avg	Lng	TD
2017	BAL	16	0	5	3	**2**	0.0	0	**2**	0	0	0	0	0	0	0	0.0	0	0
2018	BAL	10	2	4	2	**2**	0.0	0	1	0	0	0	0	0	0	0	0.0	0	0
2019	BAL	16	7	**9**	**8**	1	**1.0**	0	1	**1**	0	0	0	**1**	0	0	0.0	0	0
2022	BAL	17	**16**	1	1	0	0.0	0	0	0	0	0	0	0	0	0	0.0	0	0
2024	BAL	17	6	0	0	0	0.0	0	0	0	**1**	0	**1**	0	0	0	0.0	0	0
2026	NYG	8	6	0	0	0	0.0	0	0	0	**1**	0	0	0	0	0	0.0	0	0
Career		99	47	19	14	5	1.0	0	4	1	2	0	1	1	0	0	0.0	0	0

=== Postseason statistics ===
Year	Team	Games		Rushing					Receiving						Fumbles	
Year	Team	GP	GS	Att	Yds	Avg	Lng	TD	Tgts	Rec	Yds	Avg	Lng	TD	Fum	Lost
2018	BAL	0	0	Did not play												
2019	BAL	1	0	0	0	0.0	0	0	0	0	0	0.0	0	0	0	0
2020	BAL	2	2	0	0	0.0	0	0	**5**	**4**	**37**	**9.3**	**11**	0	0	0
2022	BAL	1	1	0	0	0.0	0	0	2	0	0	0.0	0	0	0	0
2023	BAL	2	2	0	0	0.0	0	0	0	0	0	0.0	0	0	0	0
2024	BAL	2	2	0	0	0.0	0	0	0	0	0	0.0	0	0	0	0
Career		8	7	0	0	0.0	0	0	7	4	37	9.3	11	0	0	0
