= WrestleMania Women's Battle Royal =

Professional wrestling match type held by WWE

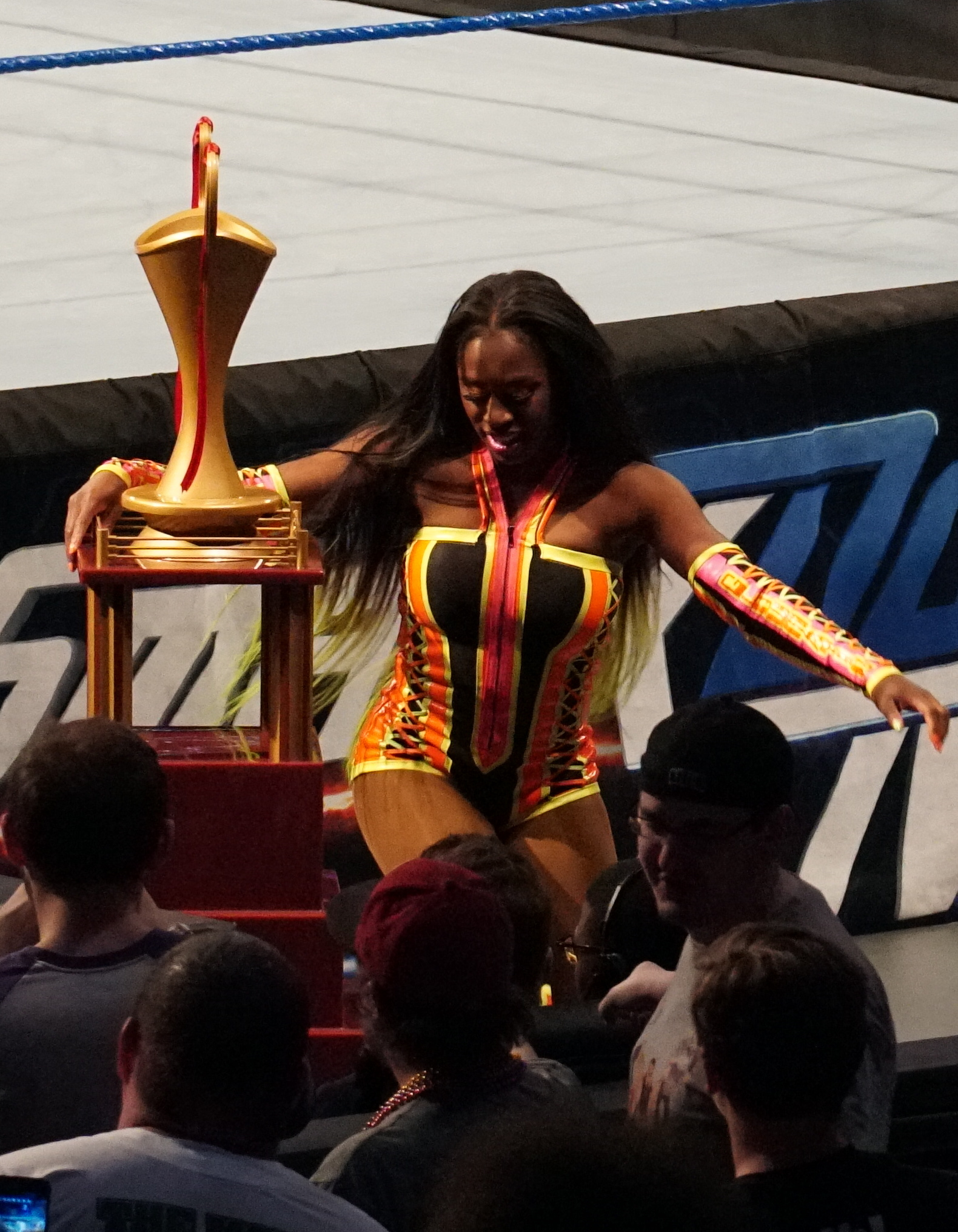
- The inaugural winner Naomi with the WrestleMania Women's Battle Royal Trophy.
- Founded: 2018
- Style: Battle royal

The WrestleMania Women's Battle Royal was a professional wrestling battle royal held at WrestleMania by the American professional wrestling promotion WWE. The winner of the match received the WrestleMania Women's Battle Royal Trophy. The inaugural battle royal was held during the WrestleMania 34 Kickoff pre-show in 2018 and was won by Naomi.

The match returned at WrestleMania 35 in 2019, won by Carmella. This would be the final match held as the battle royal did not occur at WrestleMania 36 in 2020 due to concerns regarding the COVID-19 pandemic, and although COVID restrictions were later lifted, no further matches have been scheduled at subsequent WrestleMania events.

The match was the female counterpart to the André the Giant Memorial Battle Royal, which was introduced at WrestleMania XXX in 2014. The WrestleMania Women's Battle Royal was originally named The Fabulous Moolah Memorial Battle Royal in honor of The Fabulous Moolah, who was billed as a pioneer of women's wrestling. However, her name was removed from the match after backlash from fans due to the controversy surrounding Moolah's past.

== History ==
For WrestleMania XXX in 2014, WWE established the André the Giant Memorial Battle Royal for the male wrestlers. After four years, on the March 12, 2018, episode of Raw, the promotion announced a female version of the match to occur at WrestleMania 34. Prior to this, the only other women's battle royal to occur at WrestleMania was at WrestleMania 25 in 2009, titled the "Miss WrestleMania Battle Royal". It consisted of 25 participants, which included women from the active roster as well as returning veterans. The match was infamously won by male wrestler Santino Marella, under the disguise of Santina Marella.

The women's battle royal established for WrestleMania 34 was originally titled The Fabulous Moolah Memorial Battle Royal in honor of The Fabulous Moolah. The winner was to receive The Fabulous Moolah Memorial Trophy, made in the likeness of Moolah. After a controversy over their decision to honor Moolah, WWE changed the name to the "WrestleMania Women's Battle Royal." The trophy was subsequently renamed and it was redesigned as a simple golden cup with tassels atop the trophy's base.

The inaugural match was held on WrestleMania 34's Kickoff pre-show and was won by Naomi, who last eliminated Bayley to win. The match was scheduled to return at WrestleMania 35 in 2019, thus establishing the match as a yearly tradition. This second match occurred during WrestleMania 35's Kickoff pre-show and was won by Carmella, who last eliminated Sarah Logan to win.

A third WrestleMania Women's Battle Royal was set to have occurred at WrestleMania 36 in 2020. However, due to the COVID-19 pandemic, which brought many changes to WWE's programming during that time, the match was not scheduled to limit the number of wrestlers in the ring at the same time. WrestleMania 36 itself, which was WWE's first pay-per-view and livestreaming event affected by the pandemic, was relocated and held behind closed doors at the WWE Performance Center in Orlando, Florida. COVID restrictions were later lifted, and while the André the Giant Memorial Battle Royal returned in 2021, no further WrestleMania Women's Battle Royals have been held.

== Winners ==
#	Winner	Date	Location	WrestleMania	Runner up	Ref.
1	Naomi	April 8, 2018	New Orleans, Louisiana	34 (Note: This match took place on the Kickoff Show (pre-show).)	Bayley	
2	Carmella	April 7, 2019	East Rutherford, New Jersey	35	Sarah Logan	

== Name controversy ==
The decision to hold a battle royal in honor of The Fabulous Moolah drew fan outrage. Tufayel Ahmed of Newsweek wrote that Moolah "isn't quite the bastion of female empowerment she is proclaimed to be", with "years of allegations" that she had "monopolized women's wrestling in North America", taken a large percentage of other wrestlers' pay, and "sexually exploited women under her mentorship". Jason Powell from Pro Wrestling Dot Net criticized the tribute as it did not "exactly mesh with what WWE [wanted] their women's division push to represent". David Bixenspan of Deadspin pointed out that given Moolah's alleged abuses, fans were particularly turned off by WWE personnel describing Moolah as a "trailblazer for women's equality". WWE also promoted Moolah as having "challenged the gender norms of a once male-dominated sport", but Bixenspan described that Moolah, by wrestling and teaching her students an "in-ring style low on athleticism and heavy on hair-pulling", relegated women's wrestling to "much more of a sideshow" instead of a "legitimate headline attraction" in the previous era. Mad Maxine, a wrestler trained by Moolah, commented that Moolah was the most "monstrous" person she had ever met, and that wrestling is "about generating heat. And you can't draw more heat than naming a match for The Fabulous Moolah".

On March 12, a Change.org petition appeared online demanding WWE change the name of its upcoming Fabulous Moolah Memorial Battle Royal, nearing its 10,000 signature goal. Initially, WWE reacted by disabling the comments section of their YouTube video that announced the Moolah battle royal. Later, Snickers, the primary sponsor of WrestleMania 34, called the decision to honor Moolah "unacceptable" and said they were "engaging with the WWE to express our disappointment". On March 14, WWE renamed the match "WrestleMania Women's Battle Royal", removing Moolah's name from the event. The trophy was also renamed and redesigned.
