= David Prouty High School =

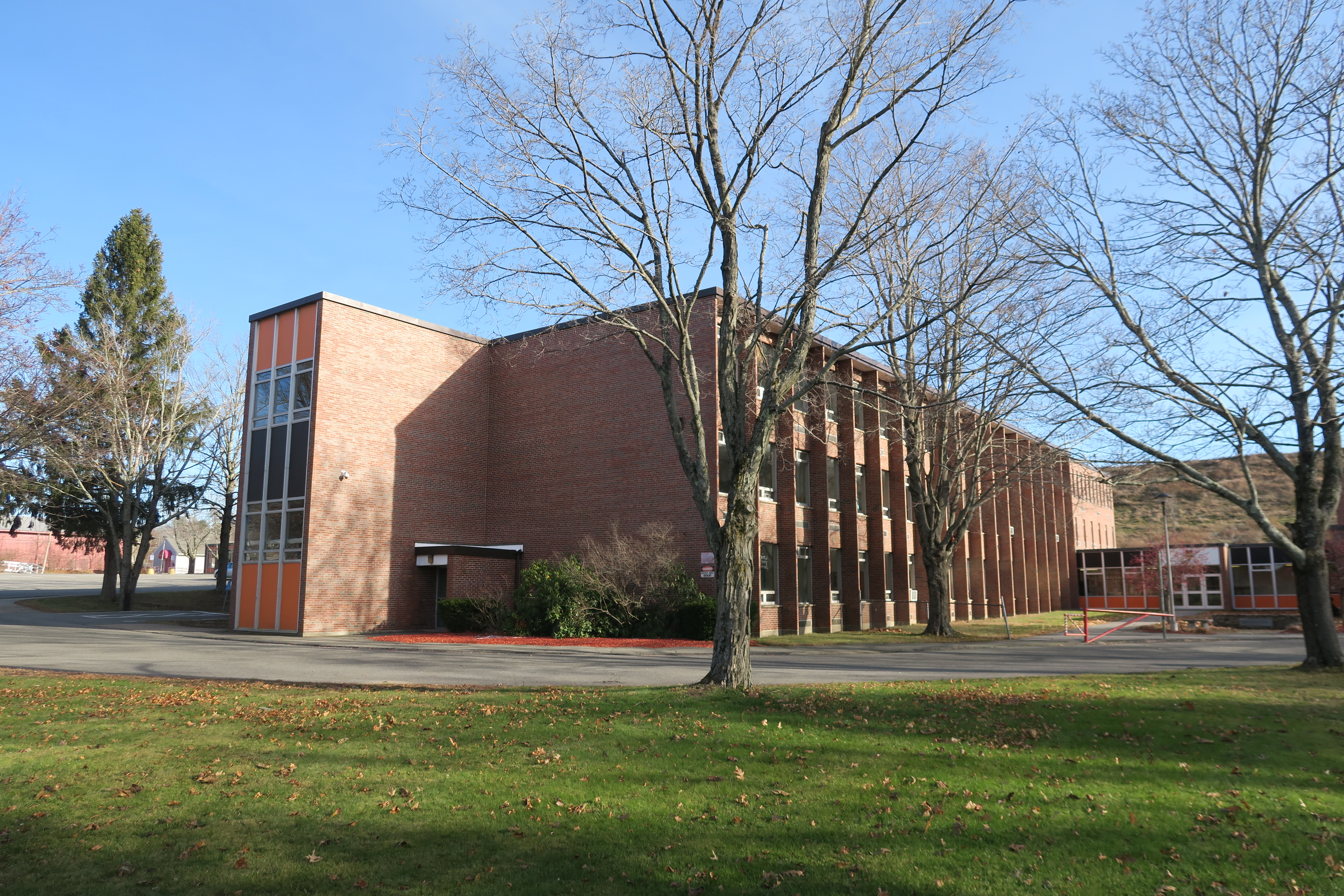

Location
- 301 Main Street; Spencer, Massachusetts; United States
- Coordinates: 42.2502°N 71.9778°W

Information
- Type: Public; Open enrollment
- Established: 1966 rebuild in 2025
- School district: Spencer-East Brookfield Region School
- Principal: C. Mary Lee LaFreniere
- Teaching staff: 30.9 (FTE)
- Grades: 9–12
- Enrollment: 306 (2024–2025)
- Student to teacher ratio: 9.9
- Colors: Black and Orange
- Athletics conference: Central Massachusetts Athletic Conference
- Mascot: Panther
- Website: www.sebrsd.org/o/dphs

David Prouty High School is a public high school located in Spencer, Massachusetts, United States. It serves the towns of Spencer and East Brookfield. In 2024, it was ranked as the #300 best high school in Massachusetts by the U.S. News & World Report. The school serves grades 9–12 with a student-to-teacher ratio of 9.9:1.

The school is currently undergoing a process of demolishing and rebuilding parts of the building, starting with the gym in preparation for building an entirely new school.

== Demographics ==
According to Massachusetts Department of Elementary and Secondary Education annual statistics, for the 2024-2025 academic year, the demographic enrollment distributions for race, gender and grade level at David Prouty High School are as follows:

Total number of enrolled students: 306
Total number of full-time equivalent educators: 30.9
Therefore, the student to teacher ratio for this school is 9.9:1

Enrollment by Race/Ethnicity (2024-2025)
Race	Enrolled Pupils*	% of District
African American	11	3.6%
Asian	9	2.9%
Hispanic	60	19.6%
Native American	1	0.3%
White	209	68.3%
Native Hawaiian, Pacific Islander	0	0.0%
Multi-Race, Non-Hispanic	16	5.2%
Total	306	100%

* Approximate number of enrolled pupils is calculated based on total number of students in district, multiplied by reported percentage, and rounded to nearest whole student.

Enrollment by gender (2024-2025)
Gender	Enrolled pupils	Percentage
Female	146	47.71%
Male	158	51.63%
Non-binary	2	0.65%
Total	306	100%

Enrollment by Grade
Grade	Pupils Enrolled	Percentage
9	79	25.82%
10	73	23.86%
11	88	28.76%
12	59	19.28%
SP*	7	2.29%
Total	306	100%

* SP = Special Education Beyond Grade 12

47.1% of students are economically challenged.

== AP Testing ==
As of 2024, 25% of students from the school have taken at least one AP exam. 11% of students have passed at least one AP exam.

== Athletics ==
David Prouty High School is part of the Central Massachusetts Athletic Conference and offers various sports programs throughout the school year. The fall sports season includes Golf, Soccer, Cheerleading, Cross Country, and Football. Winter brings Cheerleading, Boys and Girls Basketball, and Indoor Track. Spring sports offerings are Baseball, Softball, Tennis and Outdoor Track.

== Student sit-in protest – 2015 ==
On November 18, 2015, more than 200 students from David Prouty High School took part in a sit-in in protest of the district's administration. Protesting the lack of current textbooks, cuts in the music and theater programs, the band, and the Student Council, they walked out of class and spent the day in the gymnasium. Having not been satisfied with having their voices heard at the School Committee meeting the night before, they were targeting the superintendent, Tracey Crowe, whom the district's teachers had also given a vote of no confidence in.

== Notable alumni ==
- Patrick Ricard, American football player
- Leah Van Dale, professional wrestler, dancer, and model whose ring name is Carmella.
- Don Brown, American football coach: University of Massachusetts, Amherst Head Coach for their NCAA Division I Football program.

== See also ==
- List of high schools in Massachusetts
