= John Condrone =

American wrestler and singer-songwriter (1960–2020)

Personal information
- Born: John Albert Condrone; November 16, 1960 Hollywood, Florida, U.S.
- Died: October 20, 2020 (aged 59) Maryville, Tennessee, U.S.
- Cause of death: Complications from COVID-19

Professional wrestling career
- Ring name: Johnny Meadows
- Billed weight: 224 lb (102 kg)
- Trained by: Rick Conners
- Debut: November 16, 1978
- Retired: 1996

John Albert Condrone (November 16, 1960 – October 20, 2020), also known as Johnny Meadows, was an American professional wrestler and singer-songwriter.

== Early life ==
Condrone was born in Hollywood, Florida, and raised in Harriman, Tennessee. His father was a boxer with a mobile festival, being paid by visitors to fight.

== Professional wrestling ==
Condrone began wrestling in 1978 with Southeastern Championship Wrestling, and assumed the ring name of "Johnny Meadows". He was part of tag-team wrestling pairs The Paradise City Rockers and The Dream Team. When he joined World Championship Wrestling and fought Ric Flair, Hulk Hogan, the Mongolian Stomper, Big John Studd, and Abdullah the Butcher. For most of his career he wrestled as a fall guy (or "job man"), being hired to lose to his opponent.

== Music career ==
Condrone retired from wrestling in 1996 and pursued a music career. He was nominated for a Grammy Award and a Dove Award from the Gospel Music Association. More than 300 of the songs he wrote were used in television, film, and radio. He wrote for Sony, Disney, Lamon Records, and others. His Rockin’ That Beat song was a Top 10 Latin Salsa hit. His songs were placed on The British CMA Awards, Nashville, Dawson's Creek, The Good Lie and others. He wrote and/or composed songs for Selena Gomez, Julie Reeves, and Kimberly Simon. He toured with The Roane State Boys and Tranquility Express, and performed as a backup singer for Dolly Parton’s band.

His No. 1 songs include: Kimberly Simon's If You Stole My Heart (a Top Twenty CMT video), Bubba Claus, If The Heart Is Right, But Then, and Since I Found You.

== Death ==
Condrone died from COVID-19 during the COVID-19 pandemic in Tennessee. He was 59.
