= Kenny Bolin =

American professional wrestler (born 1960)

Personal information
- Born: March 16, 1960 (age 66) St. Petersburg, Florida, U.S.

Professional wrestling career
- Ring name: Kenny Bolin
- Billed height: 6"1
- Billed weight: 275 lb (125 kg)
- Trained by: Nick Gulas
- Debut: March 1997
- Retired: 2007

Kenny Bolin (born March 16, 1960) is an American retired professional wrestler, commentator, and as the lead heel manager in Ohio Valley Wrestling (OVW) as the manager of Bolin Services. Also was a former commentator in OVW.

== Professional wrestling career ==
Bolin first appeared in-ring for the Independent Wrestling Association Mid-South (IWA MS) in April 1998. On August of that same year, Bolin joined Ohio Valley Wrestling and provided his services as a manager, founding the Bolin Services stable, which grew to include a considerable roster of wrestlers including John Cena, Mark Henry, Bobby Lashley, Lance Cade, Sean O'Haire, Bull Buchanan, Rene Dupree and others. The stable disbanded in 2007.

Bolin did wrestle occasionally in matches from 1998 until 2006. He defeated The Prototype who later became known as John Cena in the Lose Leaves OVW match on September 26, 2002. His last in-ring match was a loss to Jerry "The King" Lawler in no contest on July 29, 2006, at OVW Six Flags Summer Sizzler Series.

After managing, Bolin continued working with OVW as a commentator until 2013.

== Personal life ==
Bolin is the father of Chris Bolin who is also a professional wrestler.
