= Danny Little Bear =

American professional wrestler (1925–1991)

Personal information
- Born: September 13, 1937 Hodgenville, Kentucky, U.S.
- Died: May 12, 1991 (aged 53)
- Cause of death: Liver cancer

Professional wrestling career
- Ring name(s): Danny Little Bear; Danny Littlebear; Chief Little Bear
- Billed height: 5 ft 11 in (1.80 m)
- Billed weight: 230 lb (100 kg)
- Billed from: Cheyenne, Wyoming
- Debut: 1954
- Retired: 1977

Danny Little Bear (September 13, 1937 – May 12, 1991) was an American professional wrestler who competed in North American regional promotions including the National Wrestling Alliance, particularly the Central States and Gulf Coast territories, where he remained one of the region's most popular stars during the 1960s and 70s. His feuds with Yasu Fuji & Chati Yokochi, Black Angus Campbell and manager Percival A. Friend and Eduardo Miguel Perez were the cause of frequent riots and arrests in the St. Joseph-Kansas City area during the summer of 1972.

He also had a successful stint in Stu Hart's Stampede Wrestling, holding the promotion's Stampede Wrestling North American Heavyweight Championship for much of early 1974.

== Career ==
=== Early career ===
Born in Hodgenville, Kentucky, Danny Little Bear grew up in Jonesboro, Georgia, and he made his professional wrestling debut in 1956 at age 30. Spending the next several years competing in various Southeastern regional promotions, he gained considerable experience while in Championship Wrestling from Florida and Georgia Championship Wrestling during the early 1960s.

In May 1964, Danny Little Bear faced Johnny Bruce, Sputnik Monroe and Joe McCarthy who he fought to a time limit draw at the William Bell Auditorium in Augusta, Georgia on May 25. The following night he lost to Don Carson at the Macon City Auditorium in Macon, Georgia.

Losing to Wildman Phillips and Calvin Schmidt (the Indobear) at the Ponce de Leon Ball Park in Atlanta, Georgia on June 5, he also teamed with Ron Reed in a tag team match against Johnny Heidman and Dick Dunn and in a singles match faced The Destroyer later that month.

In 1966, he would lose to Swede Karlson on May 17, 1966. Defeating Jack Vansky at the Paul Jones Sports Arena in Atlanta, Georgia on May 20, he would also team with Chief Crazy Horse against the Mysterious Medics the next night in Marietta. Losing to them in a rematch in Atlanta on May 27, he also faced Jack Vansky in a rematch on June 4 as well as defeated Pancho Rosario and Wildman Wehba during the next week.

Facing Bob Armstrong, Ken Yates and Pancho Rosario later that month, he also teamed with Chief Crazy Horse to defeat Ken Yates and Evil Eye Valentine at the Atlanta Municipal Auditorium in Atlanta on July 8. Although losing to Tito Carreon on July 15, he would later defeat Jimmy Valentine in Macon on July 26 and, with Chief Crazy, faced the Infernos in Albany, Georgia two days later. He would also briefly feud with The Golden Terror before leaving the area in early August.

=== NWA Central States and the Gulf Coast ===
The following year, he would defeat Jack Dalton for the Louisiana Heavyweight Championship in Baton Rouge, Louisiana on February 3 and, with Bobby Fields, defeated Jack and Frank Dalton for the NWA United States Tag Team Championship on February 21, 1967. Losing the Louisiana Heavyweight title to Ken Lucas on March 31 and the tag team titles back to the Daltons on April 11, he and Luke Brown would defeat Dick Murdoch and K.O. Kox in Kansas City, Missouri three months later to win the NWA North American Tag Team Championship on June 30.

The two would defend the titles for a little more than a month before Brown walked out on Danny Little Bear during a match on September 4. He later regained the tag team titles teaming with Stan Pulaski to defeat Tarzan Tyler and The Viking in a tournament final for the tag team titles on September 18. Although losing the titles to Luke Brown and The Ox the following month, Danny Little Bear teamed with The Viking to recapture the tag team titles from his former tag team partner in St. Joseph, Missouri on November 7. Holding the titles for less than two weeks, they would lose the titles to K.O. and Killer Karl Kox on November 20, 1967.

Two years later, Danny Little Bear won the NWA Central States Heavyweight championship in a tournament in St. Joseph on November 28, 1969. He held the title for over four months before losing the title to Roger Kirby on April 3, 1970. While in Maple Leaf Wrestling, he and Reg Parks lost to The Hollywood Blonds (Buddy Roberts and Jerry Brown) at the Varsity Arena in Toronto, Ontario on September 5, 1971.

The following year, he teamed with Omar Atlas to defeat Yasu Fuji and Chati Yokochi for the NWA North American Tag Team titles on January 27, 1972, before losing the titles back to Yasu Fuji and Chati Yokochi on February 10. Defeating Harley Race for the NWA Central States Heavyweight title in St. Joseph the following night, he made a brief appearance in Stampede Wrestling facing Sailor White on February 15 before returning to Kansas City to defeat Yasu Fuji and Chati Yokochi for the titles on March 9 before losing the titles back to Fuji and Yokochi in Wichita, Kansas two days later.

Later that month, he and Pat O'Connor would fight to a 45-minute time limit draw against Fuji and Yokochi in a 2-of-3 falls match at the Kansas City Memorial Hall in Kansas City on March 23.

=== Feud with Black Angus Campbell ===
On March 29 at the St. Joseph City Auditorium, he would reunite with The Viking in the semi-main event to challenge Fuji and Yokochi for the tag team titles; however, the two began fighting with each other as the match started and were counted out. Later that night, he and The Viking would also be included in a 12½-man battle royal which included Bob Orton, Sr., Steve Bolus, Pat O'Connor, Terry Martin, Rufus R. Jones, "Black" Jack Black, Yasu Fuji and Chati Yokochi, Omar Atlas, Black Angus Campbell and Percival Friend. While attempting to throw Percival Friend over the top rope, Danny Little Bear would be eliminated by Earl Black. The winner was to receive a $1,250 purse as well as a title shot against then NWA World Heavyweight Champion Dory Funk, Jr.

He and The Stomper would soon begin pursuing the NWA North American Tag Team Champions losing to them in a Texas Death Match on May 12. As the end of the match, as Danny Little Bear was about to pass out from a nerve hold submission applied by Yasu Fuji, local and state police had to restrain several fans from entering the ring. They would also fight them to a no-contest in a Texas Tornado match which eventually involved much of the wrestlers backstage to break up the fight. Despite these setbacks, he and The Stomper were able to win the titles later that month.

During this time, he began feuding with Black Angus Campbell over the NWA Central States Heavyweight Championship and soon lost the title to Campbell in Kansas City. Following the match, Campbell and his manager Percival A. Friend had to leave the arena under a police escort as fights started breaking out in the crowd.

A later rematch against Campbell in St. Joseph, Missouri resulted in a small riot that occurred when two fans attacked Campbell's manager Percival A. Friend breaking his nose and attempting to enter the ring on behalf of Danny Little Bear. However, police having been assigned to the auditorium, the fans were stopped before they could get to Campbell although promoter Gust Karras chose not to pursue charges against them. He and Omar Atlas would also lose the tag team titles to Campbell and Roger Kirby on June 29.

On June 13, he and Rufus Jones defeated Angus Campbell, Roger Kirby and manager Percival Friend in a handicap match Des Moines, Iowa. Later that year, he also defeated Harley Race as well as continuing to feud with Campbell and Kirby over the NWA Central States North American Tag Team titles facing them in a 2-of-3 falls match at the NWA Central States 40th Anniversary Show on September 22. Although Danny Little Bear took the first fall pinning Roger Kirby, he was pinned by Campbell while Kirby scored the third pinfall pinning Omar Atlas thanks in part to outside interference by Percival Friend. During the next few weeks, he defeated Harley Race on September 29 and Juan Sebastian on October 19.

On November 3, Danny Little Bear teamed with Omar Atlas and Les Thornton in a 6-man tag team match against Billy Howard, Juan Sebastian and The Destroyer in a 2-3 falls match in the semi-final main event at the St. Joseph City Auditorium in St. Joseph, Missouri. The match would last almost an hour with each team gaining one fall before Howard, Sebastian and The Destroyer scored the final pinfall after Omar Atlas was pinned.

Near the end of the match, several fans began storming the ring while Danny Little Bear faced The Destroyer. Police were able to prevent fans from entering the ring however and eventually arrested six fans before the crowd calmed down.

Later that year, he teamed with rival Black Angus Campbell to defeat Roger Kirby and The Destroyer although they failed to defeat NWA North American Central States Tag Team Champions Harley Race and Roger Kirby on December 5, 1972.

During the next year, he would regain the NWA Central States Heavyweight Championship from Roger Kirby on April 27 before losing the title to "Bulldog" Bob Brown two months later. He would also make a failed bid against recently crowned NWA World Heavyweight Champion Harley Race losing to him in St. Joseph on May 25, 1973, as well as several rematches in Des Moines the following month.

=== Stampede Wrestling ===
In early 1974, he began wrestling for Calgary-based Stampede Wrestling defeating The Stomper for the Stampede North American Heavyweight title on April 12. Enjoying a five-month reign as Stampede North American Heavyweight Champion, he also faced Jack Brisco in a match for the NWA World Heavyweight Championship in Calgary, Alberta on June 5 before losing the title to John Quinn on September 13, 1974.

Returning to the Kansas City-area, he would score victories over Jesse Ventura, Buddy King and Charlie Pullins before fighting to a no contest with Tank Patton in Sedalia, Missouri on July 22, 1975. Feuding with Patton over the next several weeks, he defeated Patton in a rematch on July 29 and teamed with Bob Geigel, Akio Sato and Ted Oates to defeat Patton, Jesse Ventura, Black Destroyer and Oki Shikina in an 8-man tag team match in Wichita on July 30.

Defeating NWA Central States Heavyweight Champion Ed Wiskowski by disqualification on July 31, he also defeated Jesse Ventura in a boxing match on August 5. Teaming with Akio Sato the following month, Danny Little Bear lost in a tag team match to Tank Patton and Mr. Seki on September 11 and, with Bob Geigel, again lost to Patton and Mr. Seki on September 25 and on October 2, 1975.

=== NWA Mid-America and later years ===
During the late 1970s, he would spend his last years in NWA Mid-America and teamed with Chief Thundercloud to defeat Dennis Condrey and Phil Hickerson for the NWA Mid-America Southern Tag Team Championship in November 1976. Successfully defending the titles against David Shults and Bill Ash, Gorgeous George, Jr. and J. J. Dillon and Dutch Mantel with partners including Plowboy Frazier, Jerry Lawler and Tommy Gilbert, they would lose the titles to Dutch Mantell and David Shults at the Mid-South Coliseum in Memphis, Tennessee on January 3, 1977. Although defeating Mantel and Shults by disqualification on January 9, they were unable to win the titles back.

Feuding with The Bounty Hunters (David and Jerry Novak) later that year, Danny Little Bear and Chief Thundercloud participated in a 10-man elimination match with The Bounty Hunters, Jerry Barber, Don Bass, The Boston Strangler, Al Costello, George Gulas and Tojo Yamamoto who eventually won the match on March 28. The following month, they would win the NWA Tennessee Tag Team Championship.

Teaming with "Pistol" Pez Whatley, he lost to Mid-West Champion Don Kent and Ed George and, during the same card, lost the NWA Tennessee Tag Team titles to "Crazy" Luke Graham and Ripper Collins on May 2.

Retiring from professional wrestling by the end of the year, he returned to Georgia and lived with his wife Mary Ann until his death in April 1991 after a bout with liver cancer. He leaves behind a daughter, a son and wife.

== Championships and accomplishments ==
- Central States Wrestling
  - NWA Central States Heavyweight Championship (3 times)
  - NWA Central States World Tag Team Championship (1 time) – with Jerry Oates
  - NWA North American Tag Team Championship (Central States version) (5 times) – with Luke Brown (1), Stan Pulaski (1), The Viking (1), Omar Atlas (2) and The Stomper (1)
- Georgia Championship Wrestling
  - NWA Macon Tag Team Championship (1 time) – with Rocky Johnson
- Gulf Coast Championship Wrestling / Southeast Championship Wrestling
  - NWA Gulf Coast Louisiana Championship (1 time)
  - NWA Tennessee Tag Team Championship (1 time) with Chief Thundercloud
  - NWA United States Tag Team Championship (Gulf Coast version) (1 time) – with Bobby Fields
- NWA Mid-America
  - NWA Southern Tag Team Championship (Mid-America version) (1 time) – with Chief Thundercloud
- NWA Tri-State
  - NWA Louisiana Tag Team Championship (4 times) – (2 times) with Kit Fox, (2 Times) with Frank Dalton
- Stampede Wrestling
  - Stampede North American Heavyweight Championship (1 time)
- Other tiles
  - City of Hattiesburg Tag Team Championship (1 time) - with Gene Lewis
