= Buck Robley =

American wrestler

- Robley, c. 1983

Personal information
- Born: Philip Thompson Robley; January 19, 1945 Bossier City, Louisiana, U.S.
- Died: May 28, 2013 (aged 68) Little Rock, Arkansas, U.S.

Professional wrestling career
- Ring name(s): Buck Robley; Buckley Christopher George Robley III; Phil Robley
- Billed height: 6 ft 1 in (185 cm)
- Billed weight: 253 lb (115 kg)
- Debut: 1968
- Retired: 1988

Philip Thompson Robley (January 19, 1945 – May 28, 2013) was an American professional wrestler who worked as "Colonel" Buck Robley mainly in the NWA Tri-State/Mid South Wrestling promotion during the 1970s and early 1980s. He also worked in St. Louis, Florida, and Kansas City, and overseas in Japan.

== Professional wrestling career ==
Robley made his professional wrestling debut in Florida in 1968. In 1970, he made his debut in Nova Scotia, Canada working for the Eastern Sports Association.

In 1974, made his debut for Leroy McGuirk's NWA Tri-State (which changed its name to Mid-South Wrestling in 1979) where he became a household name in the territory (winning a majority of his tag team titles with Bill Watts).

He won the NWA Central States Heavyweight Championship in 1978 defeating Doug "Gashouse" Gilbert. He also won the Mid-South Tag Titles with Bill Watts and Junkyard Dog from 1979 to 1980.

In April 1980, Robley and Junkyard Dog defeated the Fabulous Freebirds for the Mid-South Tag Team Championship. This led to a match on June 9, 1980 in the Municipal Auditorium putting Robley and Junkyard Dog against Freebirds Terry Gordy and Buddy Roberts (accompanied by Michael "P.S." Hayes), with the stipulation that the loser would have their hair removed. After Robley lost the match and the titles, Hayes poured hair removal cream in Junkyard Dog's eyes, (kayfabe) blinding him. The angle led to a heated feud between Junkyard Dog and the Freebirds, including several matches in which Junkyard Dog teamed with Buckley.

Given the nickname "Yellow Belly" because of the cowardly deeds he would do while in the ring. During his time in time in Mid-South, he often wore a yellow shirt which said "Nobody Calls Me Yellow" which was designed by Jim Ross.

From 1981 to 1982, Robley did two tours for All Japan Pro Wrestling.

In 1982, Robley left Mid-South Wrestling.

In 1983, he was the last NWA Southeastern Brass Knuckles Championship to win the title two times.

He managed Bob Sweetan, Lorenzo Parente and Bobby Hart.

His last matches were in 1988 for Southern Championship Wrestling in Georgia where he was also the booker.

== Death ==
Robley died on May 28, 2013, from congestive heart failure and cancer at 68 in Little Rock, Arkansas. He had been sick for some time.

== Championships and accomplishments ==
- Central States Wrestling
  - NWA Central States Heavyweight Championship (1 time)
  - NWA Central States Television Championship (1 time)
  - NWA World Tag Team Championship (Central States version) (1 time) – with Jerry Blackwell
  - NWA World Tag Team Championship (Central States version) (1 time) – with The Blue Yankee
- Southeastern Championship Wrestling – Continental Wrestling Federation
  - NWA World Brass Knuckles Championship (Southeastern version) (2 times)
- Eastern Sports Association
  - ESA International Tag Team Championship (1 time) - with Eric Pomeroy
- NWA Tri-State / Mid-South Wrestling Association
  - Mid-South Tag Team Championship (2 times) – with Bill Watts (1) and Junkyard Dog (1)
  - NWA Louisiana Tag Team Championship (2 times) – with Bill Watts (2)
  - NWA United States Tag Team Championship (Tri-State version) (2 times)– with Bill Watts (1) and Bob Slaughter (1)
- Western States Sports
  - NWA Western States Heavyweight Championship (1 time)
  - NWA Western States Tag Team Championship (1 time) – with Hank James
