= Grizzly Smith =

American professional wrestler (1932–2010)

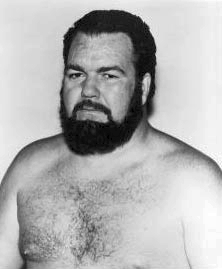
- Smith in 1969

Personal information
- Born: Aurelian Smith; August 1, 1932 Houston, Texas, U.S.
- Died: June 12, 2010 (aged 77) Amarillo, Texas, U.S.
- Spouses: Marsha Smith (divorced); Michelle Hyde (m. 1992; div. 1996)
- Children: 5, including Jake "The Snake" Roberts, Rockin' Robin, and Sam Houston
- Family: Baby Doll (ex-daughter-in-law)

Professional wrestling career
- Ring name(s): Grizzly Smith; Hurricane Smith; Jake Smith; Sky-Hi Jones; Tiny Anderson; Tiny Smith; The Kentuckian
- Billed height: 6 ft 10 in (208 cm)
- Billed weight: 350 lb (159 kg)
- Debut: 1958
- Retired: 1981

Aurelian "Grizzly" Smith (August 1, 1932 – June 12, 2010) was an American professional wrestler. He was the father of professional wrestlers Jake "The Snake" Roberts, Rockin' Robin, and Sam Houston.

Smith began wrestling in 1958. After retiring in the late-1970s, he held various backstage positions with promotions including Mid-South Wrestling, the World Wrestling Federation, and World Championship Wrestling.

Smith has been the subject of allegations of repeated sexual abuse of minors, including several of his own children. His son, WWE Hall of Famer Jake the Snake, was the result of Smith's rape of his mother.

== Professional wrestling career ==
Smith began competing in professional wrestling in Texas, but he worked on an oilfield part-time as well. Smith also competed in Georgia, where he challenged Freddie Blassie for the NWA Georgia World Heavyweight Championship but was unable to win the title belt. While wrestling in Texas, Smith met Luke Brown, who he followed to Oklahoma. Smith, who had wrestled under the ring names Jake Smith and Tiny Anderson, began competing as Grizzly Smith, although he also wrestled as Tiny Smith. Smith and Brown formed a tag team known as The Kentuckians, and the pair used the gimmick of a pair of hillbillies. Together, they won the Georgia version of the NWA Southern Tag Team Championship in 1962 and held them until dropping them to Lenny Montana and Gypsy Joe on November 23 of that year.

In 1964, the Kentuckians made a brief stop in the WWWF in the Northeast. There they feuded with Gorilla Monsoon & Klondike Bill and the Graham Brothers. The team never won the tag titles and went back south. The Kentuckians' biggest rivals were the Assassins, with whom they feuded in matches across the United States. In many of these matches, The Assassins were joined by the Missouri Mauler and The Kentuckians teamed with Haystacks Calhoun. The Kentuckians biggest win over The Assassins came while competing in the Los Angeles-based World Wrestling Association on August 8, 1965, when they defeated their rivals to win the WWA World Tag Team Championship. They held the belts for several months before dropping them to Gorilla Monsoon and Luke Graham the following January. Later in 1966, Smith and Brown won the American Wrestling Association's Midwest Tag Team Championship.

In January 1967, the Kentuckians showed up in Japan's International Wrestling Enterprise. They challenged Antonio Inoki and Hiro Matsuda for the NWA World Tag Team Championship twice but lost by disqualification both times, although Inoki was able to pin Smith in the second fall of the second match. (Matsuda later recommended Smith's daughter Rockin' Robin to work for All Japan Women's Pro Wrestling in the 1990s).

Smith's feud with The Assassins also took him to Western Canada, where he teamed with Don Leo Jonathan to defeat The Assassins for the Vancouver version of the NWA Canadian Tag Team Championship. Smith, who was wrestling under the ring name Ski Hi Jones, and Jonathan held the title from March 25, 1968, until the following month, when The Assassins regained the championship in a rematch.

Smith then returned to Texas, where he was involved in a rivalry with The Spoiler. The two wrestlers feuded over the NWA Texas Heavyweight Championship, which Smith won from The Spoiler in June 1968. The following month, Smith gained another title when he teamed with Fritz Von Erich to defeat The Spoiler and Gary Hart to win the NWA American Tag Team Championship. Smith and The Spoiler continued to feud, however, and The Spoiler regained the Heavyweight Championship in August and the Tag Team Championship in September.

The Kentuckians reunited in the NWA Tri-State territory. In an April 1971 match that was scheduled to see Bill Watts and Billy Red Lyons challenge Waldo Von Erich and Karl Von Brauner for the Tri-State version of the NWA United States Tag Team Championship, Smith and Brown took the place of the challengers. They won the match and the title belts but were stripped of the championship later that month. They continued to pursue the belts and regained them later that month, holding them until a loss to The Spoilers later that year.

After retiring as a competitor, Smith promoted wrestling events in Louisiana alongside Jack Curtis. He then worked for Bill Watts in the Mid-South territory until being fired during a disagreement over wages. From there, he went to Mississippi to work with promoter George Culkin. In the 1990s, Smith worked as a road agent for World Championship Wrestling.

== Personal life ==
Smith was born in Houston, Texas in 1932, and grew up with a brother, who died at age nine, and two sisters. He had three children from his first marriage: two sons, Aurelian Jr. and Richard, and a daughter, Jo Lynn (who was kidnapped in 1979). He later had two more children, Michael and Robin, with his second wife Marsha. Three of his children went on to become professional wrestlers: Aurelian Jr. as Jake "The Snake" Roberts, Michael as Sam Houston, and Robin as Rockin' Robin. Smith briefly married again on June 22, 1992, this time to a woman named Michelle D. Hyde who was 34 years his junior.

Smith retired from wrestling and moved to Louisiana, where he shared a house with his son Michael (Sam Houston) in Metairie. Smith and Houston took on jobs performing maintenance in a cemetery near New Orleans' French Quarter. The pair lost most of their possessions in the damage caused by Hurricane Katrina in 2005. They were able to salvage some footwear and canned food, but flooding destroyed the remainder of their belongings. Smith's health had been deteriorating for several years, and he developed a staphylococcal infection after scraping his leg the day before the storm hit. He was not able to get medical attention and almost lost his leg as a result. Smith died of Alzheimer's disease on June 12, 2010, in Amarillo, Texas.

=== Accusations of abuse ===
Smith had a strained relationship with his son Aurelian Jr. (Jake Roberts), which Roberts stated was partially the result of his father not informing his children of the scripted nature of professional wrestling. In an interview on Jake "The Snake" Roberts: Pick Your Poison, a video released by World Wrestling Entertainment, Roberts stated that his father convinced the family that his injuries in the ring were real and wore a neck brace at home to sell a storyline. On the same video, Roberts also stated that he was conceived when his father, who was dating Roberts' grandmother, raped her 14-year-old daughter (this was Jake's mother, and also stated in the documentary Beyond the Mat, in which Roberts was also featured). He said that Grizzly forced her to marry him against her will, seeing as a possibly pregnant 14-year-old daughter of the woman he was dating could bring unwanted attention. They both contend that the resulting emotional trauma is responsible for Roberts' substance abuse and his sister's mental health problems. In the A&E documentary on his son's life, Aurelian Jr., again stated that his father sexually abused minors during his childhood. The documentary also claimed that Aurelian Jr. was conceived by the rape of his mother. Smith's daughter stated that he had sexually abused her as well. In the DVD documentary, Old School with Rockin' Robin, Robin details how she was sexually abused by her father, beginning at age 8. These allegations were also the subject of the season 3 episode of Dark Side of the Ring named "In The Shadow of Grizzly Smith". His children Jake, Robin, Michael, and Richard were interviewed.

== Championships and accomplishments ==
- American Wrestling Association
  - AWA Midwest Tag Team Championship (1 time) – with Luke Brown
- Big Time Wrestling
  - NWA American Tag Team Championship (1 time) – with Fritz Von Erich
  - NWA Texas Heavyweight Championship (1 time)
- Mid-South Sports
  - NWA Southern Tag Team Championship (Georgia version) (1 time) – with Luke Brown
- NWA All-Star Wrestling
  - NWA Canadian Tag Team Championship (Vancouver version) (1 time) – with Don Leo Jonathan
- NWA Tri-State
  - NWA United States Tag Team Championship (Tri-State version) (2 times) – with Luke Brown
- Worldwide Wrestling Associates
  - WWA World Tag Team Championship (2 times) – with Luke Brown
