= Klondike Bill =

Canadian professional wrestler (1931–2000)

Personal information
- Born: William Soloweyko; December 1, 1931 Calgary, Alberta, Canada
- Died: October 3, 2000 (aged 68) Pineville, North Carolina, U.S.

Professional wrestling career
- Ring name(s): Bill Soloweyko; Klondike Bill; Kodiak Bear
- Billed height: 6 ft 0 in (183 cm)
- Billed weight: 365 lb (166 kg)
- Billed from: Kodiak Island, Alaska
- Trained by: Stu Hart
- Retired: 1987

William Soloweyko (December 1, 1931 – October 3, 2000), better known by his ring name Klondike Bill, was a Canadian professional wrestler. He wrestled in various National Wrestling Alliance territories throughout the 1960s and 1970s, before moving onto World Championship Wrestling.

== Professional wrestling career ==
Soloweyko was an accomplished amateur wrestler. After training with Stu Hart in the famous Hart Dungeon in Calgary, Alberta, he began his career wrestling as Bill "The Brute" Soloweyko. He was noted for his barrel-chested physique, beard, and bearhug finishing move. On January 18, 1962, Bill and Whipper Billy Watson defeated Chris and John Tolos to win the NWA International Tag Team Championship, until they dropped the titles back to them in March. From 1963 to 1964, as Klondike Bill, he performed for the WWWF, often defeating enhancement talent, but served on the losing end against bigger stars like WWWF Champion Bruno Sammartino, Bobo Brazil, and Ernie Ladd.

Bill unsuccessfully challenged for the NWA Worlds Heavyweight Championship on multiple occasions in 1966. However, he enjoyed championship success in 1968, winning the NWA North American Tag Team Championship with Ron Etchison in January, the All Asia Tag Team Championship with Skull Murphy in July, and the NWA Hawaii Heavyweight Championship in August. On March 21, 1971, he won the NWA National Television Championship from Luke Graham, holding the title until October 9, when he was defeated by Big Bad John. Bill would also compete for NWA Tri-State, holding the United States Tag Team Championship with Luke Brown in early 1974. He would then wrestle only sporadically after this.

He was hired by Jim Crockett during the 1970s to build guard rails and rings for Mid-Atlantic Championship Wrestling, and was also a road agent for World Championship Wrestling. In addition, he worked for Crockett's minor league baseball team, the Charlotte O's, as a groundkeeper. During the late 1990s, Bill was involved in a storyline that saw Eric Bischoff demoted as president and forced to set up a ring under Bill's supervision.

He was also known for being the only person to consume two 72-ounce steaks at the Big Texan Steak Ranch in the one-hour time limit back in the 1960s. Bill and fellow wrestler Johnny Heidemann were once kicked out of a buffet after they ate 56 pieces of chicken.

== Death ==
Soloweyko died on October 3, 2000, at the age of 68, in Pineville, North Carolina. He had been suffering from a neuromuscular disorder that took away the use of his tongue and left him speechless.

== Championships and accomplishments ==
- 50th State Big Time Wrestling
  - NWA Hawaii Heavyweight Championship (1 time)
- Georgia Championship Wrestling
  - NWA National Television Championship (1 time)
- Japan Pro Wrestling Alliance
  - All Asia Tag Team Championship (1 time) – with Skull Murphy
- NWA Central States
  - NWA North American Tag Team Championship (1 time) – with Ron Etchison
- NWA Toronto
  - NWA International Tag Team Championship (1 time) – with Whipper Billy Watson
- NWA Tri-State
  - United States Tag Team Championship (1 time) – with Luke Brown
