= NWA Louisiana Tag Team Championship =

Professional wrestling tag team championship

Details
- Promotion: NWA Tri-State
- Date established: April 14, 1959
- Date retired: No later than June 1979
Statistics
- First champions: Frankie Kovacs and Gino Angelo
- Final champions: Bill Watts and Buck Robley
- Most reigns: The Blue Demons (3)
- Longest reign: The Assassin and The Angel (175 days)
- Shortest reign: Danny Little Bear and Kit Fox (7 days); Frank Dalton and Danny Little Bear (7 days); The Blue Demons (7 days)

The NWA Louisiana Tag Team Championship was a professional wrestling tag team championship in NWA Tri-State. A secondary title after NWA Tri-State Tag Team Championship, and complementing the NWA Louisiana Heavyweight Championship, it was one of many state tag team championships recognized by the National Wrestling Alliance.

Some reigns were held by champions using a ring name, while others used their real name. There have been a total of 31 recognized individual champions and 18 recognized teams, who have had a combined 23 official reigns. The first champions were Frankie Kovacs and Gino Angelo, and the final champions were "Cowboy" Bill Watts and Buck Robley. At 175 days, The Assassin and The Angel's first and only reign was the longest. The teams of Danny Little Bear and Kit Fox, Frank Dalton and Danny Little Bear, and The Blue Demons are tied for the shortest reigns at 7 days each.

The team with the most reigns is The Blue Demons (Blue Demon #1 and Blue Demon #2) with three. Danny Little Bear has the most individual reigns with four. The following is a chronological list of teams that have been Louisiana Tag Team Champions by ring name.

== Key ==
Reigns	The number of times a specific set of wrestlers have won the titles
Event	The event promoted by the respective promotion in which the titles were won
N/A	The information is not available.
Wrestler name (#)	The number represents the number of times the wrestler has held the title individually
—	Used for vacated reigns in order to not count it as an official reign

== Title history ==
Key
No.	Overall reign number
Reign	Reign number for the specific team—reign numbers for the individuals are in parentheses, if different
Days	Number of days held

No.	Champion	Championship change			Reign statistics		Notes	Ref.
No.	Champion	Date	Event	Location	Reign	Days	Notes	Ref.
1	Frankie Kovacs and Gino Angelo	April 14, 1959	Tri-State show	Baton Rouge, LA	1	21	Defeated Prince Nero and Firpo Zybysko in a tournament final.	
—	Vacated	May 5, 1959	Tri-State show	—	—	—	The championship is vacated when Gino Angelo is injured.	
2	Pretty Boy Collins and Duke Scarbough	May 6, 1959	Tri-State show	N/A	1	23	Defeated Frankie Kovacs and Al Massey.	
3	Frankie Kovacs and Al Massey	May 29, 1959	Tri-State show	Lafayette, LA	1	(Note: The exact date on which the title was lost is not known, which means their title reign lasted between 64 and 94 days.)		
4	Mickey Sharpe and The Black Panther	August, 1959 (n)	Tri-State show	N/A	1	(Note: The exact date on which the title was won is not known, which means their title reign lasted between 61 and 91 days.)		
—	Vacated	October 1959	Tri-State show	—	—	—	The championship is vacated for unknown reasons.	
Championship history is unrecorded from to .
5	Adrien Baillargeon and Tony Jiminez	March, 1960 (n)	Tri-State show	N/A	1			
—	Vacated	March 22, 1963	Tri-State show	Monroe, LA	—	—	The championship is vacated when the team breaks up during a title defense.	
6	Danny Little Bear and Kit Fox	May 28, 1968	Tri-State show	Baton Rouge, LA	1	52	Defeated The Hines Brothers in a tournament final.	
7	The Dalton Brothers (Jack and Frank)	July 19, 1968	Tri-State show	Baton Rouge, LA	1	27		
8	Gorgeous George Jr. and Haystack Muldoon	August 15, 1968	Tri-State show	Baton Rouge, LA	1	(Note: The exact date on which the title was lost is not known, which means their title reign lasted between 1 and 15 days.)		
9	The Dalton Brothers (Jack and Frank)	August, 1968 (n)	Tri-State show	Baton Rouge, LA	2	(Note: The exact date on which the title was won is not known, which means their title reign lasted between 36 and 51 days.)		
10	Danny Little Bear and Kit Fox	October 6, 1968	Tri-State show	Baton Rouge, LA	2	7		
11	The Blue Demons (Blue Demon #1 and Blue Demon #2)	October 13, 1968	Tri-State show	Baton Rouge, LA	1	94		
12	Manuel Perez and Pepe Perez	January 15, 1969	Tri-State show	Baton Rouge, LA	1	13		
13	The Blue Demons (Blue Demon #1 and Blue Demon #2)	January 28, 1969	Tri-State show	Baton Rouge, LA	2	21		
14	Frank Dalton and Danny Little Bear	February 18, 1969	Tri-State show	Baton Rouge, LA	1	7		
15	The Blue Demons (Blue Demon #1 and Blue Demon #2)	February 25, 1969	Tri-State show	Baton Rouge, LA	3	7		
16	Frank Dalton and Danny Little Bear	March 4, 1969	Tri-State show	Baton Rouge, LA	2	61		
17	Jerry Miller and Jim Osborne	May 4, 1969	Tri-State show	Baton Rouge, LA	1			
—	Vacated	June 1968	—	—	—	—	The championship is vacated for unknown reasons.	
18	Steven Little Bear and Ray Candy	March 24, 1978	Tri-State show	Lafayette, LA	1		Won tournament.	
19	Seigfried Stanke and Kurt Von Hess	1978	Tri-State show	N/A	1			
20	Terry Latham and Ricky Fields	1978	Tri-State show	N/A	1			
21	The Assassins (Assassin #1 and Assassin #2)	December 2, 1978	Tri-State show	Alexandria, LA	1	(Note: The exact date on which the title was vacated is not known, which means their title reign lasted between 1 and 29 days.)		
—	Vacated	1978	—	—	—	—	The championship is vacated when Assassin #2 leaves the territory.	
22	The Assassin and The Angel	January 6, 1979	Tri-State show	Shreveport, LA	1	175	Defeated Terry Latham and Ricky Fields in a tournament final.	
23	Bill Watts and Buck Robley	June 30, 1979	Tri-State show	Alexandria, LA	1	48	On July 21, 1979, Watts and Robley defeated The Assassin and The Angel in a Steel Cage match to win the NWA United States Tag Team Championship.	
—	Deactivated	August 17, 1979	—	—	—	—	The championship is abandoned when Watts is injured and leaves the promotion to form Mid-South Wrestling.	

== List of top combined reigns ==
¤	The exact length of one title reign is uncertain, so the shortest possible length is used.

=== By team ===
Rank	Team	No. of reigns	Combined days
1.	The Assassin and The Angel	1	175
2.	The Blue Demons	3	122
3.	Frank Dalton and Danny Little Bear	2	68
4.	Frankie Kovacs and Al Massey	1	64¤
5.	Mickey Sharpe and The Black Panther	1	61¤
6.	Danny Little Bear and Kit Fox	2	59
7.	Bill Watts and Buck Robley	1	48
8.	The Assassins	1	29¤
9.	The Dalton Brothers	2	27¤
10.	Pretty Boy Collins and Duke Scarbough	1	23
11.	Adrien Baillargeon and Tony Jiminez	1	22¤
12.	Frankie Kovacs and Gino Angelo	1	21
13.	Manuel Perez and Pepe Perez	1	13
14.	Gorgeous George Jr. and Haystack Muldoon	1	1¤
15.	Jerry Miller and Jim Osborne	1	N/A
16.	Steven Little Bear and Ray Candy	1	N/A
17.	Seigfried Stanke and Kurt Von Hess	1	N/A
18.	Terry Latham and Ricky Fields	1	N/A

=== By wrestler ===
Rank	Wrestler	No. of reigns	Combined Days
1.	Assassin #1	2	204¤
2.	The Angel	1	175
3.	Danny Little Bear	4	127
4.	Blue Demon #1	3	122
5.	Blue Demon #2	3	122
6.	Frank Dalton	4	95¤
7.	Frankie Kovacs	2	85¤
8.	Al Massey	1	64¤
9.	Mickey Sharpe	1	61¤
10.	The Black Panther	1	61¤
11.	Kit Fox	1	59
12.	Bill Watts	1	48
13.	Buck Robley	1	48
14.	Assassin #2	1	29¤
15.	Jack Dalton	2	27¤
16.	Pretty Boy Collins	1	23
17.	Duke Scarbough	1	23
18.	Adrien Baillargeon	1	22¤
19.	Tony Jiminez	1	22¤
20.	Gino Angelo	1	21
21.	Pepe Perez	1	13
22.	Gorgeous George Jr.	1	1¤
23.	Haystack Muldoon	1	1¤
24.	Jerry Miller	1	N/A
25.	Jim Osborne	1	N/A
26.	Steven Little Bear	1	N/A
27.	Ray Candy	1	N/A
28.	Seigfried Stanke	1	N/A
29.	Kurt Von Hess	1	N/A
30.	Terry Latham	1	N/A
31.	Ricky Fields	1	N/A
