= Luke Brown =

American professional wrestler (1955-1997)

Personal information
- Born: Carl Dennis Campbell; July 28, 1935 Kentucky, U.S.
- Died: November 12, 1997 (aged 62) Washington, D.C., U.S.

Professional wrestling career
- Ring name(s): Luke Brown; Man Mountain Campbell
- Billed height: 6 ft 8 in (203 cm)
- Billed weight: 328 lb (149 kg)
- Trained by: Fred Atkins
- Debut: 1958
- Retired: 1977

Carl Dennis Campbell Sr. (July 28, 1935 – November 12, 1997) was an American professional wrestler better known by his ring name Luke "Big Boy" Brown. He is most noted for being one-half of a tag team in the 1950s and 1960s known as the Kentuckians, along with Grizzly Smith.

== Professional wrestling career ==
Brown began his professional wrestling career in 1958, traveling with carnivals. Wrestler Frankie Townsend gave him the name "Man Mountain Campbell", which Brown used up until 1961. For a short period during this time he tagged with Stan Stasiak, and they were the first tag team to ever hold the NWA International Tag Team Championship (Toronto version). They defeated Ivan and Karol Kalmikoff on June 8, 1961 in a tournament to win this title.

In 1961, Brown also began teaming with Grizzly Smith. The duo became known as The Kentuckians, and they were known for their long beards, dungarees, and cow horn.

Brown, as Man Mountain Campbell, had his first main event match on April 12, 1960 against Hans Schmidt in Minneapolis, Minnesota. His first match in Madison Square Gardens took place November 13, 1960 in a tag team match with Haystacks Calhoun against The Kangaroos.

He retired from professional wrestling in 1977 after a shoulder injury.

== Personal life ==
Brown was married three times.

He was in poor health during his last years of life, including kidney failure that required him to undergo dialysis. He died of a stroke in a Washington, D.C. hospital in 1997. He was buried in Elkton, Maryland.

== Championships and accomplishments ==
- American Wrestling Association
  - AWA Midwest Tag Team Championship (2 time) – with Jake Smith, Tim woods
- Central States Wrestling
  - NWA United States Heavyweight Championship (Central States version) (1 time)
  - NWA North American Tag Team Championship (Central States version) (3 times) – with Tor Kamata, Danny Little Bear, and Ox Baker
- Georgia Championship Wrestling
  - NWA Southern Tag Team Championship (Georgia version) (1 time) – with Jake Smith
- Maple Leaf Wrestling
  - NWA International Championship (Toronto version) (1 time)
  - NWA International Tag Team Championship (Toronto version) (1 time) – with Stan Stasiak
- NWA Tri-State
  - NWA United States Tag Team Championship (Tri-State version) (5 times) – with Dutch Savage (1), Danny Hodge (1), Jake Smith (2), and Klondike Bill (1)
- NWA San Francisco
  - NWA World Tag Team Championship (San Francisco version) (1 time) – with Mr. Kleen
- Superstar Championship Wrestling
  - SCW Western States Tag Team Championship (2 times) – with Ray Steele and Eddie Sullivan
- Worldwide Wrestling Associates
  - WWA World Tag Team Championship (2 times) – with Jake Smith
- Wrestling Fans International Association
  - WFIA Wrestling Award (1968)
