= Bob Sweetan =

Canadian professional wrestler

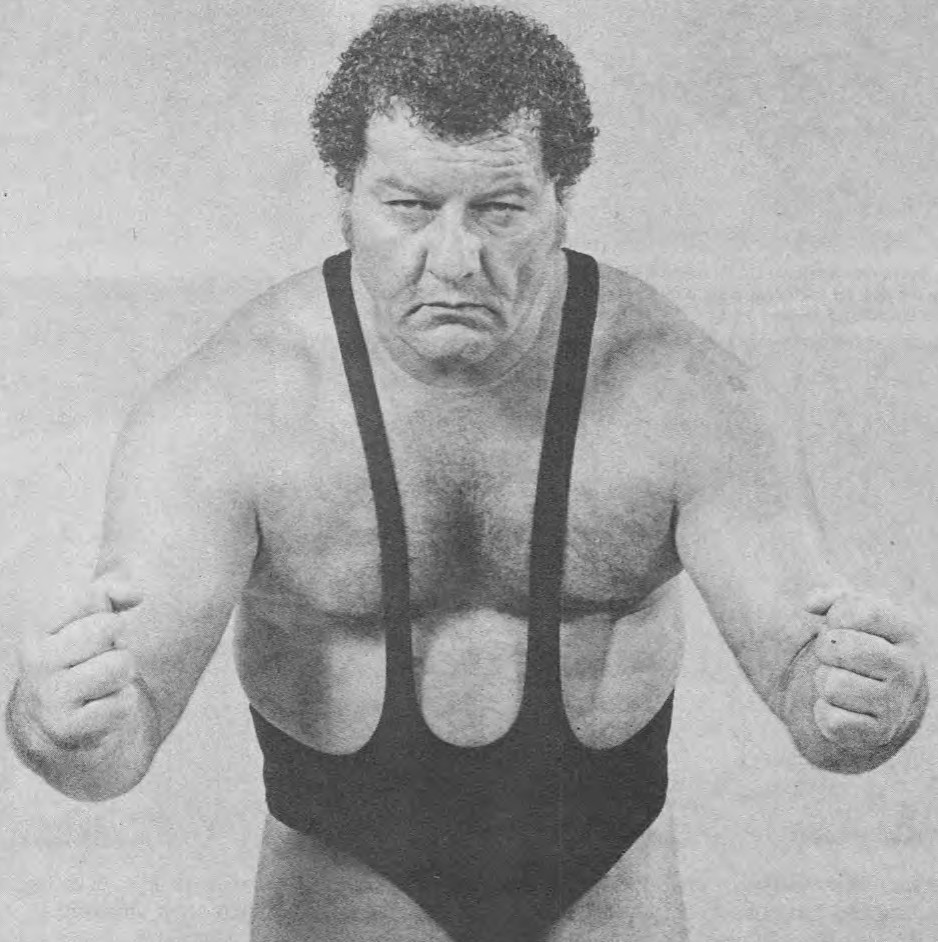
- Sweetan, circa 1983

Personal information
- Born: Robert Beier; July 4, 1940 Goodsoil, Saskatchewan, Canada
- Died: February 10, 2017 (aged 76) Nanaimo, British Columbia, Canada

Professional wrestling career
- Ring name(s): Bob Sweetan; KO Kox; Mister Pile Driver
- Billed height: 5 ft 10 in (1.78 m)
- Billed weight: 271 lb (123 kg)
- Trained by: Stu Hart
- Debut: 1966 (Kansas City)
- Retired: 1985

Robert Carson (born Robert Beier; July 4, 1940 – February 10, 2017), better known by his ring name Bob Sweetan, was a convicted sex offender and former Canadian professional wrestler. Sweetan was nicknamed "Bruiser" and "Mr. Piledriver", the latter in reference to his finishing maneuver.

== Early years ==
Beier was born on a farm near Goodsoil, Saskatchewan, about four hours north of Saskatoon. He played briefly with the Canadian Football League's Toronto Argonauts, and, after a period of traveling, settled in Calgary, the home of Stu Hart and his Stampede Wrestling promotion. Beier was introduced to pro wrestling by Gerd Topsnik, a door-to-door cookware salesman who wrestled part-time for Hart. Beier recalled: "I told [Topsnik], 'All right, I'll buy your pots and pans if you get me started in wrestling.' He started taking me to Stu's." It is unclear when Beier changed his legal surname to Carson.

== Professional wrestling career ==
Sweetan held numerous titles over his career. He enjoyed some success with the National Wrestling Alliance and wrestled with Freddie Prosser who went under the name Freddie Sweetan in Canada for Stampede Wrestling. Sweetan and Terry Gibbs defeated Fabulous Freebirds for the NWA Central States Tag Team Championship. He also wrestled for the World Wrestling Council in Puerto Rico. In the WWC he defeated King Tonga for the WWC Puerto Rico Heavyweight Championship. Sweetan was in the first ever WWC Aniversario. He played himself in the movie The Wrestling Queen in 1975.

Sweetan wrestled many notable wrestlers during his career such as Rufus R. Jones, Buzz Tyler, Randy Rose, Ted DiBiase, Bill Watts, Frank Hoy, Butch Reed, Adrian Adonis, Tully Blanchard, and Jesse Ventura. "Dr. Death" Steve Williams described him as a "very, very tough man." Sweetan was known for causing riots in arenas due to his heel antics, and was an influence on Shawn Michaels.

== Post-wrestling work ==
Following his pro wrestling career, Sweetan worked as an air conditioning maintenance supervisor, particularly in large apartment buildings.

== Legal issues ==
In 1990, Sweetan was convicted of the sexual assault of his daughter, Candace. He also faced a separate charge of non-payment of child support. Sweetan stopped checking in with police in 2000, after which he was located and deported back to his native Canada.

== Criticism ==
On WWE's Legends of Wrestling in 2009, longtime industry personality Jim Ross stated that he "didn't like" Sweetan and "didn't want to be around him", describing him as a "miserable human being". Ross later called him a "bully", and told how Danny Hodge once physically tortured Sweetan as payback for being out of line. In his 2012 autobiography, Jim Duggan also referred to Sweetan as a "bully", and a "real piece of garbage". Leo Burke called him "easy to work with" in the ring but "kind of lazy", while Ed "Colonel DeBeers" Wiskoski said of Sweetan: "I wasn't a fan of his... from being a locker-room thief to just among other things, just an asshole."

Sweetan's ex-wife Rebecca commented: "He's a waste of skin as far as I'm concerned... He fried his brain [with drugs], deserted his children, abused them emotionally, physically, sexually, mentally."

== Personal life ==
Sweetan met an Iowa woman, Rebecca Jane Terhune, at a Kansas City club in 1969 and the couple were married in Los Angeles in 1971. They had four children. Sweetan also had one child to another woman.

Sweetan allegedly deserted his family on October 15, 1985; he had been having an affair with a ring rat who was also a drug dealer. Rebecca divorced Sweetan in 1986.

== Death ==
Sweetan died at a Nanaimo, British Columbia nursing home on February 10, 2017. He had been suffering from diabetes, memory problems and mobility issues.

== Championships and accomplishments ==
- Big Time Wrestling (San Francisco)
  - NWA United States Heavyweight Championship (San Francisco version) (2 times)
- Central States Wrestling
  - NWA Central States Heavyweight Championship (5 times)
  - NWA Central States Tag Team Championship (2 times) - with Mike George (1) and Terry Gibbs (1)
  - NWA Central States Television Championship (2 times)
  - NWA North American Tag Team Championship (Central States version) (5 times) – with Dick Murdoch (2), Killer Kox ( Freddie Sweetan ) (3)
  - NWA United States Heavyweight Championship ( Central States Version ) ( 1 time )
  - NWA World Tag Team Championship (Central States version) (1 time) - with Bob Brown
- Mid-States Championship Wrestling
  - MSCW Heavyweight Championship (1 time)
- NWA Gulf Coast
  - NWA Gulf Coast Heavyweight Championship (1 time)
- NWA Tri-State - Mid-South Wrestling Association
  - NWA Tri-State Tag Team Championship (3 times) - with Seigfried Stanke (1), Prince Tapu (1), and Tony Rocco (1)
  - NWA Brass Knuckles Championship (Tri-State version) (6 times)
  - Mid-South Tag Team Championship (1 time) - with Mike George
- Southwest Championship Wrestling
  - SCW Southwest Heavyweight Championship (2 times)
  - SCW Southwest Tag Team Championship (1 time) - with Dick Slater
- Stampede Wrestling
  - NWA International Tag Team Championship (Calgary version) (4 times) - with The Beast (1), Gil Hayes (1), Fred Sweetan (1) and Paul Peller (1)
- World Wrestling Council
  - WWC Puerto Rico Heavyweight Championship (1 time)
