= Seigfried Stanke =

1970s American professional wrestler

Personal information
- Born: William J. Lehman; 25 March 1938 San Antonio, Texas
- Died: 12 November 2012 (aged 74) Seguin, Texas

Professional wrestling career
- Ring name(s): Seigfried Stanke; Siegfried Stanke; Siegfried Steinke; The Spoiler; Spoiler #2; Bill Lehman; Wilhelm Lehman
- Billed height: 6 ft 2 in (1.88 m)
- Billed weight: 275 lb (125 kg)
- Trained by: Joe Blanchard
- Debut: 1972
- Retired: 1985

William J. Lehman (March 25, 1938 – November 12, 2012), better known by the ring name Seigfried Stanke was an American professional wrestler, active during the 1970s.

== Career ==
Stanke began wrestling in Dallas, Texas with Big Time Wrestling, notably teaming with Lord Alfred Hayes, being defeated by Jose Lothario and Mil Mascaras. Stanke also had feuds with the Von Erichs.

Lehman died on November 12, 2012 in Seguin, Texas.

== Championships and accomplishments ==
- NWA All-Star Wrestling
  - NWA Pacific Coast Heavyweight Championship (Vancouver Version) (2 times)
  - NWA Canadian Tag Team Championship (Vancouver version) (3 times) - with Dale Lewis (2) and Gene Kiniski (1)
- NWA Tri-State
  - NWA Tri-State Tag Team Championship (2 times) – with Bob Sweetan and Steve Lawler
  - NWA Louisiana Tag Team Championship (1 time) – with Kurt Von Hess
- NWA Western States Sports
  - NWA Western States Heavyweight Championship (1 time)
  - NWA Brass Knuckles Championship (1 time)
  - NWA Western States Tag Team Championship (1 time) – with Karl von Steiger
- NWA Big Time Wrestling
  - NWA Texas Heavyweight Championship (2 times)
- Universal Wrestling Alliance
  - UWA Canadian Heavyweight Championship (2 times)
