= Dutch Savage =

American professional wrestler (1935–2013)

Personal information
- Born: Frank Stewart; June 9, 1935 Scranton, Pennsylvania, U.S.
- Died: August 3, 2013 (aged 78) Vancouver, Washington, U.S.

Professional wrestling career
- Ring name(s): Dutch Savage; Dutch Schultz; Mr. X Lonnie Brown
- Billed height: 6 ft 4 in (193 cm)
- Billed weight: 265 lb (120 kg)
- Trained by: Luke Brown
- Debut: 1961
- Retired: 1981

Frank Stewart (June 9, 1935 – August 3, 2013) was an American professional wrestler and wrestling promoter, best known for his time spent competing in Pacific Northwest Wrestling under the ring name Dutch Savage.

== Career ==
Savage made his pro debut in 1962 in Macon, Georgia, using the ring name Lonnie Brown, then spent the next few years competing across North America, in Hawaii and in Japan (going by the ring names Mr. X and Dutch Schultz). Savage first began using his most famous ring name during a stint in the Kansas City territory. He eventually settled in the Pacific Northwest region in 1966, splitting his time between PNW in Portland and NWA All Star Wrestling in Vancouver, British Columbia. Savage also had a brief stint in the AWA territory where he formed a solid tag team with Hard Boiled Haggerty. However, when a trip to Japan was offered, Dutch opted to leave the AWA after only a few months. His most memorable matches while in the AWA were with the masked Doctor "X" (Dick Beyer, aka The Destroyer) and Mad Dog Vachon.

Savage wrestled mainly as a heel early in his career, but he turned face around 1971 during a feud with Bull Ramos in Portland. He also formed a legendary tag team in PNW with Jimmy Snuka that won six Pacific Northwest tag team titles; one of their reigns lasted for a record 11 months in 1974-75. He originated the Coal Miner's Glove match in 1972 in Eugene, Oregon, and went undefeated in that specialty match during his career. In Vancouver, British Columbia, Savage captured 13 NWA Canadian tag team titles, second only to the record of 18 Canadian tag titles won by Don Leo Jonathan (with whom Savage won the championship once, in 1977).

On the promotional side, he later bought out Sandor Kovacs' ownership stake in the Washington territory and also purchased a one-third portion of PNW, getting into promoting as well as doing color commentary for PNW's Portland Wrestling program on Portland station KPTV (syndicated outside of Portland to the rest of Oregon and Washington as Big Time Wrestling) after his retirement from active competition around 1981.

Savage was involved in real estate for many years after his wrestling career, and he served as the play-by-play host for the Championship Wrestling USA promotion's TV program during the 1990s, but eventually retired. He later became an administrator for his official website (Dutch Savage.com) and hosted a program called "Dutch's Corner", where he taught King James Scripture, on Public-access television out of Portland, Oregon. He and his wife Willa lived on their farm in the mountains of southwest Washington, close to Mount St. Helens, and adopted Yacolt, Washington, as their home town.

On April 13, 2013, it was reported that Savage had suffered a stroke on April 10, which left him with paralysis on his left side and other complications. According to his daughter, Mitzi Stewart Graham, Dutch Savage died August 3, 2013, in Vancouver, Washington.

In November 2013, a biographical DVD titled "Don't Count Me Out - The Dutch Savage Story" featuring extensive interview footage with Savage discussing his life inside and outside the ring was released by NW History Hunters (www.nwhistoryhunters.com). This 1 hour-18 minute DVD features vintage video, photos and newspaper clippings from Savage's life story as a celebrated high-school athlete, professional wrestler and promotion co-owner, through his retirement years as a pastor, and also contains the first-ever interview footage with his wife Willa.

== Championships and accomplishments ==
- 50th State Big Time Wrestling
  - NWA Hawaii Heavyweight Championship (1 time)
- Central States Wrestling
  - NWA North American Tag Team Championship (Central States version) (1 time) - with Rocky Hamilton
- NWA All-Star Wrestling
  - NWA Canadian Tag Team Championship (Vancouver version) (13 times) - with Don Jardine (1), Stan Stasiak (2), John Tolos (1) Bob Brown (2), John Quinn (1), Steven Little Bear (4), Gene Kiniski (1), and Don Leo Jonathan (1)
  - NWA World Tag Team Championship (Vancouver version) (2 times) - with Don Jardine
- NWA Tri-State
  - NWA United States Tag Team Championship (Tri-State version) (1 time) - with Luke Brown
- Pacific Northwest Wrestling
  - NWA Pacific Northwest Heavyweight Championship (7 times)
  - NWA Pacific Northwest Tag Team Championship (12 times) - with Jimmy Snuka (6), Moondog Mayne (2), Steven Little Bear (1), Jonathan Boyd (1), Beauregard (1), and Stan Stasiak (1)
- Ring Around The Northwest Newsletter
  - Tag Team of the Year (1972–1974, 1976) with Lonnie Mayne and Jimmy Snuka
  - Wrestler of the Year (1974)
