= Sonny Myers =

American professional wrestler (1924–2007)

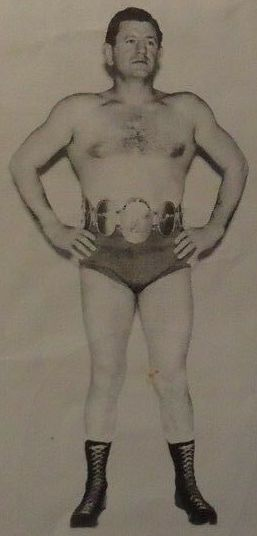

Personal information
- Born: Harold Myers; January 22, 1924 St. Joseph, Missouri, U.S.
- Died: May 7, 2007(aged 83) St. Joseph, Missouri, U.S.

Professional wrestling career
- Ring name: Sonny Myers
- Billed from: St. Joseph, Missouri
- Trained by: Gust Karras

Harold "Sonny" Myers (January 22, 1924 – May 7, 2007) was an American professional wrestler, involved in the business for sixty years.

== Professional wrestling career ==
Myers held prominent heavyweight championships in several territories, most notably the Central States territory, where he was the NWA Central States Heavyweight Champion fourteen times. He also held various tag team championships, as well as a brief reign as NWA World Heavyweight Champion having defeated Orville Brown in November 1947. His championship was largely forgotten when the National Wrestling Alliance was formed a year later, recognizing Brown as champion.

After wrestling Myers acted as sheriff in Buchanan County, Missouri and promoted a Sonny Myers Carnival for 22 years.

Sonny Myers died after a long illness on May 7, 2007.

== Championships and accomplishments ==
- Central States Wrestling
  - NWA Central States Heavyweight Championship (14 times)
  - NWA Central States Tag Team Championship (1 time) – with Bobby Graham
  - NWA North American Tag Team Championship (Central States version) (4 times) – with Pat O'Connor (2) and Ron Etchison (2)
  - NWA United States Heavyweight Championship (Central States version) (2 times)
  - NWA World Tag Team Championship (Central States version) (2 times) – with Thor Hagen (1) and Pat O'Connor (1)
- Gulf Coast Championship Wrestling
  - NWA Southern Junior Heavyweight Championship (1 time)
- Southwest Sports, Inc.
  - NWA Texas Heavyweight Championship (5 times) ^{1}
- St. Louis Wrestling Club
  - NWA Missouri Heavyweight Championship (1 time)
- Western States Sports
  - NWA North American Heavyweight Championship (Amarillo version) (2 times)
  - NWA Southwest Heavyweight Championship (1 time)
  - NWA Southwest Tag Team Championship (3 times) – with Dizzy Davis (1), Leo Garibaldi (1), and Larry Chene (1) (Note: Myers' first reign with the title occurred prior to the formation of the National Wrestling Alliance and prior to the NWA assuming control over the championship.)
  - NWA World Tag Team Championship (Amarillo version) (4 times) - with Dizzy Davis (2), Gory Guerrero (1) and Leo Garibaldi (1)
