= Bob Geigel =

American professional wrestler and promoter (1924–2014)

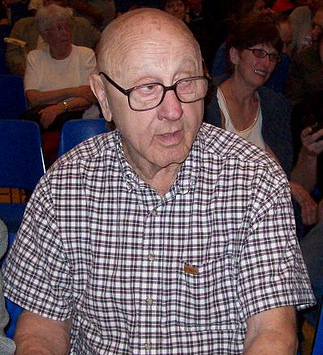
- Geigel in 2009
- Born: Robert Frederick Geigel; October 1, 1924; Algona, Iowa, U.S.
- Died: October 30, 2014 (aged 90); Kansas City, Missouri, U.S.
- Education: University of Iowa
- Occupations: Promoter, professional wrestler, Seabee
- Organization: NWA Central States (1963–1986)
- Spouse: Vera June Lackender (m. 1947)
- Children: 3
- Professional wrestling career
- Ring name(s): A-Bomber; Bob Geigel
- Billed height: 5 ft 11 in (180 cm)
- Billed weight: 220 lb (100 kg)
- Billed from: Algona, Iowa
- Trained by: Alphonse Bisignano
- Debut: 1950
- Retired: 1987
- Military service
- Allegiance: United States
- Branch: United States Navy
- Unit: Seabee
- Conflicts: World War II (Pacific Theater)

Robert Frederick Geigel (October 1, 1924 – October 30, 2014) was an American professional wrestling promoter and professional wrestler. He operated the Kansas City, Missouri-based Heart of America Sports Attractions promotion from 1963 to 1986, and served three terms as the president of the National Wrestling Alliance from 1978 to 1980, from 1982 to 1985, and finally from 1986 to 1987.

== Early life ==
Geigel was born on October 1, 1924, in Algona, Iowa to Frederick Samuel and Leota May Geigel. He attended Algona High School, graduating in 1942. After graduating, Geigel enlisted in the United States Navy. He served in the Asiatic-Pacific Theater of World War II as a Seabee.

After leaving the navy, Geigel began studying at the University of Iowa in 1946. He graduated in 1950 with a degree in physical education. Geigel was a champion amateur wrestler during his college years, coming in third place during the 1948 NCAA Championships in the 191 pounds (87 kg) weight division. After graduating, Geigel considered trying out for the Chicago Cardinals before deciding to become a professional wrestler.

== Professional wrestling career ==
Geigel was recruited into professional wrestling by Alphonse Bisigniano. He debuted in 1950 in Texas. Wrestling primarily in Pinkie George's Midwest Wrestling Association out of Kansas City, Missouri, and also in Amarillo, Texas, Geigel generally played the part of the "heel" or antagonist. He became a full-time professional wrestler in 1952. Though he was generally introduced as being from Algona, Iowa, he was billed as "Texas" Bob Geigel. He also wrestled as "A-Bomber" while working under a mask in Amarillo.

Geigel frequently held tag team championships in his home promotion, holding the NWA Central States World Tag Team Championship four times, and the NWA North American Tag Team Championship (Central States version) nine times. Geigel had a long-standing feud with former tag team partner Bob Brown in Kansas City. He officially retired from the ring in 1976, but continued to wrestle sporadically in the 1980s.

== Promoting career ==
Geigel became a promoter in 1963, when he took over management of the Kansas City office. Partnering with Gus Karras and Pat O'Connor, he renamed the promotion Heart of America Sports Attractions. He then took his place on the board of the National Wrestling Alliance (NWA). In that same year, Geigel was cited as a co-defendant in an anti-monopoly case brought against the Central States territory by previous owner Pinkie George. Along with his partners Karras and O'Connor, and fellow co-defendant George Simpson, he refuted the charge, and it was eventually dropped.

In 1978, Geigel became President of the NWA, his first term lasting until 1980. During this term he strongly supported Harley Race, a part-owner of Heart of America, as NWA World Heavyweight Champion. Geigel and Race bought out Sam Muchnick's portion of the St. Louis Wrestling Club, a cornerstone territory of the NWA. Geigel served a second and third term as NWA President from 1982 to 1985 and 1986 to 1987. He retired from promoting wrestling in 1988.

Geigel sold Heart of America Sports Attractions to Jim Crockett Jr. in September 1986. He repurchased the promotion in February 1987 but closed it in 1988.

== Personal life ==
Geigel owned a bar in Kansas City called The Tender Trap. Geigel worked security at The Woodlands racetrack in Kansas City, Kansas after retiring from wrestling, until suffering a broken hip in early 2014. Geigel met his wife Vera at the University of Iowa, and they were married for more than 65 years. They had three daughters.

== Death ==
He suffered from Alzheimer's disease. Geigel died on October 30, 2014, in a nursing home in Kansas City.

== Championships and accomplishments ==
- American Wrestling Association
  - AWA Canadian Open Tag Team Championship (1 time) - with Bill Miller
  - AWA Midwest Tag Team Championship (1 time) – with Bob "The Viking" Morse.
  - AWA World Tag Team Championship (3 times) – with Hard Boiled Haggerty (1), Otto von Krupp (1), and Stan "Krusher" Kowalski (1)
- Cauliflower Alley Club
  - Art Abrams Lifetime Achievement Award (2007)
- Central States Wrestling
  - NWA Central States Heavyweight Championship (6 times)
  - NWA North American Tag Team Championship (Central States version) (9 times) – with Bob Brown (5), Bill Miller (1), Bob "The Viking" Morse (1), The Stomper (1), and Rufus R. Jones (1)
  - NWA United States Heavyweight Championship (Central States version) (2 times)
  - NWA World Tag Team Championship (Central States version) (4 times) – with Rufus R. Jones (2), Akio Sato (1), and Pat O'Connor (1)
- George Tragos/Lou Thesz Professional Wrestling Hall of Fame
  - Class of 2002
- Western States Sports
  - NWA North American Heavyweight Championship (Amarillo version) (1 time)
  - NWA Southwest Heavyweight Championship (2 times)
  - NWA Southwest Tag Team Championship (4 times) – with Dory Funk (2), Mike Gallagher (1), and Boris Kalmikoff (1)
  - NWA World Tag Team Championship (Amarillo version) (2 times) - with Dory Funk

== See also ==
- Heart of America Sports Attractions

Preceded by Edward Gossett	President of the National Wrestling Alliance; 1978–1980	Succeeded by Jim Crockett, Jr.
Preceded by Jim Crockett, Jr.	President of the National Wrestling Alliance; 1982–1985	Succeeded by Jim Crockett, Jr.
Preceded by Jim Crockett, Jr.	President of the National Wrestling Alliance; 1986–1987	Succeeded by Jim Crockett, Jr.
