= Omar Atlas =

Venezuelan professional wrestler (born 1938)

Omar Atlas is a Venezuelan professional wrestler who competed in North American and international promotions including the National Wrestling Alliance, Stampede Wrestling and the World Wrestling Federation from the late 1950s until the early 1990s. An ally of Venezuelan wrestler Cyclone Negro, he was often billed as his younger half-brother Omar Negro when teaming with him in NWA Southwest Sports during the 1960s and later in Championship Wrestling from Florida during the 1970s.

== Career ==
Atlas began his professional wrestling career in Spain in 1958, subsequently working throughout Latin America before moving to the United States in 1962. He competed in numerous territories of the National Wrestling Alliance (NWA), as well as Canada's Stampede Wrestling, where he held the Stampede North American Heavyweight Championship.

Atlas also held the NWA Central States Heavyweight Championship during the 1970s. In 1984, Atlas began appearing for the World Wrestling Federation, primarily in preliminary matches.

In 1993, Atlas retired from professional wrestling.

== Championships and accomplishments ==
- Cauliflower Alley Club
  - Other honoree (2004)
- Central States Wrestling
  - NWA Central States Heavyweight Championship (1 time)
  - NWA North American Tag Team Championship (Central States version) (2 times) - with Danny Little Bear
  - NWA World Tag Team Championship (Central States version) (2 times) - with Pat O'Connor
- Championship Wrestling from Florida
  - NWA Florida Tag Team Championship (2 time) - with Cyclone Negro
- NWA Big Time Wrestling
  - NWA Texas Heavyweight Championship (1 time)
- Pacific Northwest Wrestling
  - NWA Pacific Northwest Tag Team Championship (1 time) - with Nick Bockwinkel
- Southwest Championship Wrestling
  - SCW Southwest Tag Team Championship (1 time) - with Bobby Jaggers
- Stampede Wrestling
  - Stampede North American Heavyweight Championship (1 time)
- World Wrestling Council
  - WWC Caribbean Tag Team Championship (1 time) - with Invader I
