= Black Angus Campbell =

Scottish professional wrestler

Frank Hoy
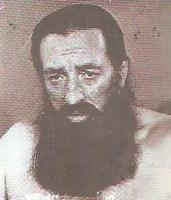

Personal information
- Born: Francis Patrick Hoy; 19 October 1934 Enniskillen, Northern Ireland
- Died: 21 April 2005 (aged 70) Stranraer, Scotland

Professional wrestling career
- Ring name(s): Black Angus Campbell; Rasputin; Wild Angus
- Billed height: 6 ft 4 in (193 cm)
- Billed weight: 297 lb (135 kg)
- Billed from: Scotland
- Debut: 1954
- Retired: 1982

Francis Patrick Hoy (19 October 1934 – 21 April 2005) was a Scottish professional wrestler, better known by the ring names Black Angus Campbell, Wild Angus, and Rasputin (whilst wearing a wrestling mask).

== Early life ==
Hoy was born in Enniskillen in Northern Ireland.

== Professional wrestling career ==
Wearing a long black beard and a kilt, Hoy wrestled as a heel, mostly in Europe (where he featured regularly on World of Sport in the United Kingdom during the 1970s and 1980s), and managed one of his greatest achievements in 1978 when he captured the European Heavyweight Championship.

Hoy also wrestled in North America, initially with Stampede Wrestling and later in Central States Wrestling, where from around 1970 to 1974 he was a regular performer under the management of Percival A. Friend. Here his most notable feuds were against Buck Robley and Ox Baker. He also wrestled in Japan, including a notable 45-minute draw in 1978 at the Hakodate City Gym, Hokkaidō featuring Billy Robinson and himself against Dory Funk, Jr. and Terry Funk.

In later life Hoy ended his involvement with wrestling and, according to Harley Race, worked as a park ranger in Scotland. He died in his home town of Stranraer in 2005. His son, Steve McHoy aka Steve Casey, was also a professional wrestler.

== Championships and accomplishments ==
- All Japan Pro Wrestling
  - World's Strongest Tag Determination League Technique Award (1978) – with Billy Robinson
- Central States Wrestling
  - NWA Central States Heavyweight Championship (1 time)
  - NWA Central States Television Championship (1 time)
  - NWA North American Tag Team Championship (Central States version) (1 time) – with Roger Kirby
  - NWA World Tag Team Championship (Central States version) (1 time) - with Ron Starr
- Joint Promotions/All Star Wrestling
  - European Heavyweight Championship (1 time)
- Pacific Northwest Wrestling
  - NWA Pacific Northwest Heavyweight Championship (1 time)
- Stampede Wrestling
  - Stampede North American Heavyweight Championship (2 times)
