= NWA Tri-State Tag Team Championship =

Professional wrestling tag team championship

Details
- Promotion: NWA Tri-State
- Date established: 1962
- Date retired: 1982

Other name
- NWA United States Tag Team Championship (Tri-State version)
Statistics
- First champions: Jan Madrid and Louie Tillet
- Most reigns: The Hollywood Blondes (Jerry Brown and Buddy Roberts) and The Medics (Billy Garrett and Jim Starr) (4 reigns)
- Longest reign: Tom Jones and Billy Red Lyons (295 days)
- Shortest reign: Luke Brown and Danny Hodge (2 days)

The NWA Tri-State Tag Team Championship was a tag team title created in 1962, and contested in the National Wrestling Alliance's Tri-State territory, which was promoted by Leroy McGuirk (Arkansas and Oklahoma) and Jack Curtis and Aurelian "Grizzly" Smith (Louisiana). For most of its existence, the title was the Tri-State version of the NWA United States Tag Team Championship.

This group of promoters existed until Bill Watts' Mid-South Wrestling bought out the majority of the Tri-State territory, and also Gil Culkin and George Gulkin's Mississippi territory, in August 1979. After Watts took over, McGuirk took the title to Oklahoma, the only part of the Tri-State territory not owned by Watts. The U.S. Tag Team Championship's name was then changed to the Tri-State Tag Title in 1980.

The title lasted until Tri-State closed in 1982, when Mid-South Wrestling took over Oklahoma from McGuirk.

== Title history ==
Key
No.	Overall reign number
Reign	Reign number for the specific champion
Days	Number of days held

No.	Champion	Championship change			Reign statistics		Notes	Ref.
No.	Champion	Date	Event	Location	Reign	Days	Notes	Ref.
NWA United States Tag Team Championship (Tri-State version)
1	Jan Madrid and Louie Tillet	1962	Tri State show	(Note: The location of the championship change has not been found documented.)	1	(Note: The length of the reign is too uncertain to calculate)	Records are unclear as to whom they defeated.	
2	Alberto and Ramon Torres	1962	Tri State show		1			
3	The Dirty Daltons (Jack and Jim Dalton)	July 2, 1962	Tri State show	Tulsa, Oklahoma	1			
Championship history is unrecorded from July 2, 1962 to September 2, 1963.
4	Jerry Kozak and Bill Watts	September 2, 1963	Tri State show	Tulsa, Oklahoma	1		Defeated The Bolos to win the championship	
Championship history is unrecorded from September 2, 1963 to April 1966 (NLT).
—	Vacated	April 1966 (NLT)	—	—	—	—	Championship vacated for undocumented reasons	
5	The Assassins (Assassin 1 and Assassin 2)	May 10, 1966	Tri State show	Little Rock, Arkansas	1		Defeated Stan Kowalski and The Great Matsuda in a tournament final.	
Championship history is unrecorded from May 10, 1966 to 1966/1967.
6	Jack Brisco and Haystacks Calhoun	1966/1967	Tri State show		1		Records are unclear as to whom they defeated. According to his answer to a question on the Wrestlingclassics.com website from 08-01-2002, Jack Brisco said that they beat the Assassins.	
Championship history is unrecorded from 1966/1967 to March 10, 1967.
7	The Assassins (Assassin 1 and Assassin 2)	March 10, 1967	Tri State show	Oklahoma City, Oklahoma	2	60	Defeated Skandor Akbar and Swede Karlson.	
8	Jack Brisco (2) and Gorgeous George, Jr.	May 9, 1967	Tri State show	Little Rock, Arkansas	1	7		
9	Togo Shikuma and Chati Yokouchi	May 16, 1967	Tri State show	Little Rock, Arkansas	1	(Note: The exact date the championship was won or lost is unknown, which means the reign lasted between 138 and 138 days.)		
10	Skandor Akbar and Danny Hodge	October 1967	Tri State show		1	(Note: The exact date the championship was won or lost is unknown, which means the reign lasted between 31 and 91 days.)		
11	Chuck Karbo and Chati Yokouchi	December 1967	Tri State show		1	(Note: The exact date the championship was won or lost is unknown, which means the reign lasted between 92 and 151 days.)		
12	Jack Donovan and Ron Reed	April 1968	Tri State show	Tulsa, Oklahoma	1	(Note: The exact date the championship was won or lost is unknown, which means the reign lasted between 4 and 33 days.)		
Championship history is unrecorded from April 1968 to May 4, 1968.
13	Skandor Akbar and Danny Hodge	May 4, 1968	Tri State show	Shreveport, Louisiana	2	(Note: The exact date the championship was won or lost is unknown, which means the reign lasted between 1 day and 213 days.)	Defeated Chuck Karbo and Chati Yokouchi.	
Championship history is unrecorded from May 4, 1968 to December 3, 1968.
14	Danny Hodge (3) and Lorenzo Parente	December 3, 1968	Tri State show	Little Rock, Arkansas	1	(Note: The exact date the championship was won or lost is unknown, which means the reign lasted between 29 and 59 days.)	Records unclear as to whom they defeated.	
15	Treach Phillips and Karl Von Stroheim	January 1969	Tri State show		1	(Note: The exact date the championship was won or lost is unknown, which means the reign lasted between 95 and 125 days.)		
16	Alberto and Ramon Torres	May 6, 1969	Tri State show	Little Rock, Arkansas	2	(Note: The exact date the championship was won or lost is unknown, which means the reign lasted between 148 and 178 days.)		
17	The Medics (Billy Garrett and Jim Starr)	October 1969	Tri State show	Little Rock, Arkansas	1	(Note: The exact date the championship was won or lost is unknown, which means the reign lasted between 1 day and 31 days.)		
18	Alberto and Ramon Torres	1969	Tri State show		3	(Note: The exact date the championship was won or lost is unknown, which means the reign lasted between 1 day and 30 days.)		
19	The Medics (Billy Garrett and Jim Starr)	1969	Tri State show		2	(Note: The exact date the championship was won or lost is unknown, which means the reign lasted between 1 day and 30 days.)		
20	Tarzan Baxter and Karl Karlson	November 2, 1969	Tri State show	Little Rock, Arkansas	1	91		
21	Luke Brown and Dutch Savage	February 1, 1970	Tri State show	Tulsa, Oklahoma	1	59		
—	Vacated	April 1970	—	—	—	—	Championship vacated when Dutch Savage left the promotion	
22	The Hollywood Blonds (Jerry Brown and Buddy Roberts)	May 8, 1970	Tri State show		1	19	Records unclear as to whom they defeated.	
23	Luke Brown (2) and Danny Hodge (4)	May 27, 1970	Tri State show	Springfield, Missouri	1	2		
24	The Hollywood Blonds (Jerry Brown and Buddy Roberts)	May 29, 1970	Tri State show	Oklahoma City, Oklahoma	2	(Note: The exact date the championship was won or lost is unknown, which means the reign lasted between 217 and 247 days.)		
25	Billy Red Lyons and Bill Watts (2)	January 1971	Tri State show		1	(Note: The exact date the championship was won or lost is unknown, which means the reign lasted between 29 and 89 days.)		
26	Karl Von Brauner and Waldo Von Erich	March 1971	Tri State show		1	(Note: The exact date the championship was won or lost is unknown, which means the reign lasted between 1 day and 60 days.)		
27	The Kentuckians (Luke Brown (3) and Grizzly Smith)	April 1971	Tri State show		1	(Note: The exact date the championship was won or lost is unknown, which means the reign lasted between 1 day and 59 days.)		
28	The Spoilers (Spoiler #1 and Spoiler #2)	1971	Tri State show		1	(Note: The exact date the championship was won or lost is unknown, which means the reign lasted between 1 day and 60 days.)		
29	Tom Jones and Billy Red Lyons (2)	May 31, 1971	Tri State show	Shreveport, Louisiana	1	295		
30	The Continental Warriors (Bobby Hart and Lorenzo Parente)	March 21, 1972	Tri State show	Monroe, Louisiana	1	153		
31	Tom Jones (2) and Ken Mantell	August 21, 1972	Tri State show	Shreveport, Louisiana	1	7		
32	Terry Garvin and Duke Myers	August 28, 1972	Tri State show	Monroe, Louisiana	1	(Note: The exact date the championship was won or lost is unknown, which means the reign lasted between 95 and 125 days.)	This was a disputed victory. Garvin and Myers defeated The Continental Warriors and Tom Jones and Ken Mantell in a three-team tournament on September 4, 1972 in Shreveport, Louisiana, making them the rightful champions.	
33	Yasu Fuji and Chati Yokouchi	December 1972	Tri State show		1	(Note: The exact date the championship was won or lost is unknown, which means the reign lasted between 44 and 74 days.)	The title change occurred no later than this date.	
34	Bull Bullinski and Dennis Stamp	February 13, 1973	Tri State show	Shreveport, Louisiana	1	7		
35	The Hollywood Blonds (Jerry Brown and Buddy Roberts)	February 20, 1973	Tri State show	Tulsa, Oklahoma	3	(Note: The exact date the championship was won or lost is unknown, which means the reign lasted between 1 day and 99 days.)		
36	Eddie Sullivan and Rip Tyler	1973	Tri State show		1	(Note: The exact date the championship was won or lost is unknown, which means the reign lasted between 1 day and 99 days.)		
37	Dewey Robertson and Dennis Stamp (2)	May 1973	Tri State show		1	(Note: The exact date the championship was won or lost is unknown, which means the reign lasted between 1 day and 91 days.)		
38	Alex Perez and El Gran Tapio	July 1973	Tri State show		1	(Note: The exact date the championship was won or lost is unknown, which means the reign lasted between 32 and 91 days.)		
39	Kim Duk and Stan Kowalski	September 1973	Tri State show		1	(Note: The exact date the championship was won or lost is unknown, which means the reign lasted between 93 and 152 days.)		
40	Luke Brown (4) and Klondike Bill	January 1974	Tri State show		1	(Note: The exact date the championship was won or lost is unknown, which means the reign lasted between 29 and 89 days.)		
41	Brown and Siegfried Stanke	March 1974	Tri State show		1	(Note: The exact date the championship was won or lost is unknown, which means the reign lasted between 62 and 121 days.)	Brown and Stanke also defeated Bob Kelly and Rocket Monroe in March 1974 in Shreveport, Louisiana, unifying the Gulf Coast version of the U.S. Tag Team Championship.	
42	Chief Thundercloud and Chief White Cloud	June 1974	Tri State show		1	(Note: The exact date the championship was won or lost is unknown, which means the reign lasted between 63 and 121 days.)		
43	Steve Lawler and Jim White	September 1974	Tri State show		1	(Note: The exact date the championship was won or lost is unknown, which means the reign lasted between 1 day and 59 days.)		
44	Johnny Eagles and Terry Lathan	October 1974	Tri State show		1	(Note: The exact date the championship was won or lost is unknown, which means the reign lasted between 1 day and 30 days.)		
45	Frank Goodish and Stan Hansen	October 1974	Tri State show		1	(Note: The exact date the championship was won or lost is unknown, which means the reign lasted between 251 and 281 days.)		
46	Jay Clayton and Danny Hodge (5)	July 9, 1975	Tri State show	Fort Smith, Arkansas	1	(Note: The exact date the championship was won or lost is unknown, which means the reign lasted between 84 and 114 days.)		
47	Killer Karl Kox and Dick Murdoch	October 1975	Tri State show		1	(Note: The exact date the championship was won or lost is unknown, which means the reign lasted between 32 and 91 days.)		
	vacated	December 1975	N/A	N/A			Championship vacated when Knox and Murdoch broke up the team	
48	Greg Valentine and Bill Watts (3)	January 7, 1976	Tri State show		1	(Note: The exact date the championship was won or lost is unknown, which means the reign lasted between 1 day and 24 days.)	Defeated The Hollywood Blonds.	
49	Greg Valentine and Gorgeous George Jr.	January 1976	Tri State show		1	(Note: The exact date the championship was won or lost is unknown, which means the reign lasted between 47 and 77 days.)	Watts was injured, and Gorgeous George, Jr. replaced him.	
50	The Hollywood Blonds (Jerry Brown and Buddy Roberts)	March 18, 1976	Tri State show	New Orleans, Louisiana	4	11		
51	Buck Robley and Bob Slaughter	March 29, 1976	Tri State show	Tulsa, Oklahoma	1	30		
52	Ted DiBiase and Dick Murdoch (2)	April 28, 1976	Tri State show	Fort Smith, Arkansas	1	13		
53	Killer Karl Kox (2) and Bob Sweetan	May 11, 1976	Tri State show	Shreveport, Louisiana	1	161		
54	Killer Karl Kox (3) and Ken Patera	October 19, 1976	Tri State show		1	(Note: The exact date the championship was won or lost is unknown, which means the reign lasted between 1 and 74 days.)	Defeated Bob Sweetan and Randy Tyler	
55	Billy Robinson and Bill Watts (4)	1976	Tri State show	Shreveport, Louisiana	1	(Note: The exact date the championship was won or lost is unknown, which means the reign lasted between 1 and 103 days.)		
56	Skandor Akbar (2) and Choi Sun	January 1977	Tri State show	Shreveport, Louisiana	1	(Note: The exact date the championship was won or lost is unknown, which means the reign lasted between −321 and −291 days.)		
57	Tony Rocco and Bob Sweetan	March 16, 1977	Tri State show	Shreveport, Louisiana	1	10		
58	The Medics (Billy Garrett and Jim Starr)	March 26, 1977	Tri State show	Shreveport, Louisiana	3	143		
59	Porkchop Cash and Mike George	August 16, 1977	Tri State show	Shreveport, Louisiana	1	7		
60	The Medics (Billy Garrett and Jim Starr)	August 23, 1977	Tri State show	Shreveport, Louisiana	4	35		
61	Porkchop Cash and Dr. X	September 27, 1977	Tri State show	Shreveport, Louisiana	1	30		
62	Ciclón Negro and Dr. X	October 27, 1977	Tri State show		1	(Note: The exact date the championship was won or lost is unknown, which means the reign lasted between 1 day and 65 days.)	Defeated Ray Candy and Porkchop Cash after Cash and Dr. X split up.	
63	The Brute and Dr. X	1977	Tri State show		1	(Note: The exact date the championship was won or lost is unknown, which means the reign lasted between 53 and 117 days.)		
64	Ray Candy and Steven Little Bear	February 22, 1978	Tri State show	Baton Rouge, Louisiana	1	42		
65	The Assassin (3) and Ernie Ladd	April 5, 1978	Tri State show	Baton Rouge, Louisiana	1	18		
66	Ray Candy and Steven Little Bear	April 23, 1978	Tri State show	Baton Rouge, Louisiana	2	12		
67	Jerry Brown (5) and Bobby Jaggers	May 5, 1978	Tri State show	Oklahoma City, Oklahoma	1	197		
68	Mike George (2) and Randy Tyler	November 18, 1978	Tri State show	Tulsa, Oklahoma	1	(Note: The exact date the championship was won or lost is unknown, which means the reign lasted between 13 and 36 days.)		
	vacated	December 1978	N/A	N/A			Championship vacated after a match against Jerry Brown and Bobby Jaggers ended inconclusively.	
69	André the Giant and Dusty Rhodes	December 25, 1978	Tri State show	New Orleans, Louisiana	1	(Note: The exact date the championship was won or lost is unknown, which means the reign lasted between 7 and 30 days.)	Defeated Stan Hansen and Ernie Ladd in the finals of the 10-team tournament.	
70	Dusty Rhodes and The Spoiler (2)	January 1979	Tri State show		1	(Note: The exact date the championship was won or lost is unknown, which means the reign lasted between 1 day and 25 days.)	The Spoiler took the place of André the Giant.	
71	The Angel and The Assassin (4)	January 25, 1979	Tri State show	New Orleans, Louisiana	1	177	The Spoiler turned on Rhodes.	
72	Buck Robley and Bill Watts (5)	July 21, 1979	Tri State show	New Orleans, Louisiana	1	27		
	vacated	August 17, 1979	N/A	N/A			Championship vacated when Robley was injured by Angelo Mosca during a match. At this point Bill Watts formed Mid-South Wrestling and introduced the Mid-South Tag Team Championship.	
73	Sugar Bear Harris and Oki Shikina (Pedro Zapata)	October 1979	Tri State show		1	(Note: The exact date the championship was won or lost is unknown, which means the reign lasted between 5 and 35 days.)	Records are unclear as to whom they defeated.	
74	Herb Calvert and Jimmy Garvin	November 5, 1979	Tri State show	Tulsa, Oklahoma	1	(Note: The exact date the championship was won or lost is unknown, which means the reign lasted between 26 and 56 days.)		
75	Steve Lawler and Siegfried Stanke	December 1979	Tri State show		1	(Note: The exact date the championship was won or lost is unknown, which means the reign lasted between 63 and 93 days.)		
76	Eddie Gilbert and Tommy Gilbert	March 3, 1980	Tri State show	Tulsa, Oklahoma	1			
NWA Tri-State Tag Team Championship
77	Ron McFarlane and Doug Somers	1980	Tri State show		1			
78	Hector Guerrero and Ron Sexton	1980	Tri State show		1			
79	Ron McFarlane and Doug Somers	1980	Tri State show		2			
80	Eddie Gilbert and Tommy Gilbert	1980	Tri State show		2			
—	Vacated	1980	—	—	—	—	Championship vacated when Tommy Gilbert was injured.	
81	Chief Frank Hill and Terry Orndorff	1981	Tri State show		1		Won a tournament.	
Championship history is unrecorded from 1981 to 1981.
—	Vacated	1981	—	—	—	—	Championship vacated after a match against The Akbar Army (Jerry Brown and Ron McFarlane).	
Championship history is unrecorded from 1981 to 1981.
82	The Akbar Army (Jerry Brown (6) and Ron McFarlane (3))	1981	Tri State show		1		Records unclear as to whom they defeated.	
83	Eddie Gilbert (3) and Ricky Morton	May 16, 1981	Tri State show	Tulsa, Oklahoma	1	(Note: The exact date the championship was won or lost is unknown, which means the reign lasted between 1 day and 56 days.)		
84	Mike George (3) and Ed Wiskoski	July 11, 1981	Tri State show	Tulsa, Oklahoma	1	14		
85	Eddie Gilbert (4) and Ricky Morton	July 25, 1981	Tri State show	Tulsa, Oklahoma	2			
Championship history is unrecorded from July 25, 1981 to 1981.
86	Dave and Joel Deaton	1981	Tri State show		1		Records unclear as to whom they defeated.	
87	Eric Embry and Chief Frank Hill	1981	Tri State show		1			
88	Porkchop Cash and Doug Somers	1981	Tri State show		1			
—	Vacated	1981	—	—	—	—	Championship vacated when Cash and Somers broke up the team	
89	Turk Ali Bey and El Toro	1981	Tri State show		1		Records unclear as to whom they defeated.	
Championship history is unrecorded from 1981 to 1982.
—	Deactivated	1982	—	—	—	—	NWA Tri-State closed, territory was taken over by Mid-South Wrestling.	
