= NWA North American Tag Team Championship (Central States version) =

Professional wrestling tag team championship

Details
- Promotion: Heart of America Sports Attractions / Central States Wrestling
- Date established: 1963
- Date retired: 1973
Statistics
- First champion(s): Sonny Myers and Pat O'Connor
- Most reigns: Team: "Bulldog" Bob Brown and Bob Geigel (5 times); Individually: Bob Geigel (11 times)
- Longest reign: "Bulldog" Bob Brown and Bob Geigel (267 days)
- Shortest reign: Great Togo and Tokyo Joe (0 days) (Note: The championship was effectively abandoned the moment the match was won.)
- Oldest champion: Bob Geigel (48 years, 123 days) (Note: Records in the birth dates of wrestlers from this era are not complete, it is possible there was an older champion.)
- Youngest champion: Dick Murdoch (23 years, 26 days) (Note: Records in the birth dates of wrestlers from this era are not complete, it is possible there was a younger champion.)
- Heaviest champion: Klondike Bill (365 lb (166 kg)) (Note: Records for the weight of some wrestlers from this era are not complete, it is possible there was a heavier champion.)
- Lightest champion: Black Angus Campbell (224 lb (102 kg)) (Note: Records for the weight of some wrestlers from this era are not complete, it is possible there was a lighter champion.)

The Heart of America Sports Attractions, or "NWA Central States" version of the NWA North American Tag Team Championship was a secondary Tag team championship promoted by the Heart of America Sports Attraction promotion, a National Wrestling Alliance territory based out of Kansas City, Missouri and was defended in Missouri, Kansas and the surrounding states. The Championship was active from 1963 until 1973, originally designed to be a replacement for the NWA Central States Tag Team Championship and after 10 years was replaced with the Central States version of the NWA World Tag Team Championship. Because the championship was a professional wrestling championship, it was not won or lost competitively but instead by the decision of the bookers of a wrestling promotion. The championship was awarded after the chosen team "won" a match to maintain the illusion that professional wrestling is a competitive sport.

Documentation shows that a total of 44 individuals formed 39 different teams for a total of 58 Championship reigns, possibly more as there are periods where the championship history was not clearly documented. The first champions were the team of Sonny Myers and Pat O'Connor and the final champions were Great Togo and Tokyo Joe. With Togo and Joe's victory the NWA North American Tag Team Championship was immediately replaced with the Central States version of the NWA World Tag Team Championship. Due to the replacement Togo and Joe's reign is the shorted with 0 minutes. The longest team reign was 267 as "Bulldog" Bob Brown and Bob Geigel held the championship from September 22, 1966 until June 16, 1967. Brown and Geigel are the team with the most reigns, five in total and Bob Geigel is the person with the most individual reigns, twelve in total.

== Title history ==
Key
No.	Overall reign number
Reign	Reign number for the specific team—reign numbers for the individuals are in parentheses, if different
Days	Number of days held

No.	Champion	Championship change			Reign statistics		Notes	Ref.
No.	Champion	Date	Event	Location	Reign	Days	Notes	Ref.
1	Sonny Myers and Pat O'Connor	December 19, 1963	CSW show	Kansas City, Kansas	1	63	Myers and O'Connor defeated The Stomper and Mike Sharpe in tournament final	
2	Bob Geigel and Bill Miller	February 20, 1964	CSW show	Kansas City, Kansas	1	92		
3	Sonny Myers and Pat O'Connor	May 22, 1964	CSW show	Kansas City, Kansas	2	(Note: The date the championship was lost has not been documented which means the championship reign lasted anywhere between 1 day and 28 days)		
Championship history is unrecorded from May 22, 1964 to June 19, 1964.
4	Don Slatton and Moose Evans	June 19, 1964 (NLT)	CSW show	(Note: The exact location was not documented for this title change.)	1	(Note: The date the championship was lost has not been documented which means the championship reign lasted anywhere between 196 days and 244 days)		
Championship history is unrecorded from June 19, 1964 to February 1965.
—	Vacated	February 1965	—	N/A	—	—	Championship was vacated for undocumented reasons	
5	Doug Gilbert and Ron Reed	February 19, 1965	CSW show	St. Joseph, Missouri	1	(Note: The date the championship was lost has not been documented which means the championship reign lasted anywhere between 14 days and 33 days)	Defeated Dutch Savage and Tom Clark to win the vacant championship; also recognized as the NWA United States Tag Team Championship.	
6	Rocky Hamilton and Dutch Savage	March 1965	CSW show		1	(Note: The date the championship was lost has not been documented which means the championship reign lasted anywhere between 1 day and 20 days)		
7	Doug Gilbert and Ron Reed	March 25, 1965	CSW show	Kansas City, Kansas	2	63		
8	Bob Geigel (2) and Dutch Savage (2)	May 27, 1965	CSW show	Kansas City, Kansas	1	46		
—	Vacated	July 12, 1965	—	N/A	—	—	Vacated for unknown reasons	
9	"Bulldog" Bob Brown and Bob Geigel (3)	August 1965	CSW show	Amarillo, Texas	1	(Note: The date the championship was won has not been documented which means the championship reign lasted anywhere between 261 days and 291 days)	Won tournament; may be held up after a match against Lou Thesz and Bob Ellis in December 1965.	
10	Bob Ellis and The Stomper	May 19, 1966	CSW show	Kansas City, Kansas	1	56		
11	Jack Donovan and The Viking	July 14, 1966	CSW show	Kansas City, Kansas	1	70		
12	"Bulldog" Bob Brown and Bob Geigel (4)	September 22, 1966	CSW show	Kansas City, Kansas	2	267		
13	Ron Etchison and Sonny Myers (3)	June 16, 1967	CSW show	St. Joseph, Missouri	1	111		
14	Bob Ellis (2) and The Viking (2)	October 5, 1967	CSW show	Kansas City, Kansas	1	14		
15	"Bulldog" Bob Brown and Bob Geigel (5)	October 19, 1967	CSW show	Kansas City, Kansas	3	84		
16	Ron Etchison (2) and Klondike Bill	January 11, 1968	CSW show	Kansas City, Kansas	1	21		
17	"Bulldog" Bob Brown and Bob Geigel (6)	February 1, 1968	CSW show	Kansas City, Kansas	4	98		
18	Ron Etchison (3) and Sonny Myers (4)	May 9, 1968	CSW show	Kansas City, Kansas	2	77		
19	Roger Kirby and The Viking (3)	July 25, 1968	CSW show	Kansas City, Kansas	1	35		
20	Ron Etchison (4) and Sonny Myers (5)	August 29, 1968	CSW show	Kansas City, Kansas	3	8		
21	"Bulldog" Bob Brown and Bob Geigel (7)	September 5, 1968	CSW show	Kansas City, Kansas	5	56		
22	Terry Martin and Tommy Martin	October 31, 1968	CSW show	Kansas City, Kansas	1	7		
23	The Outlaws (Dick Murdoch and Dusty Rhodes)	November 7, 1968	CSW show	Kansas City, Kansas	1	50		
24	Bob Geigel (8) and The Viking (4)	December 27, 1968	CSW show	Kansas City, Kansas	1	132		
25	K.O. Kox and Dick Murdoch (2)	May 8, 1969	CSW show	Kansas City, Kansas	1	35		
26	Luke Brown and Tor Kamata	June 12, 1969	CSW show	Kansas City, Kansas	1	17		
27	K.O. Kox and Dick Murdoch (3)	June 19, 1969	CSW show	Kansas City, Kansas	2	(Note: The date the championship was lost has not been documented which means the championship reign lasted anywhere between 11 days and 42 days)		
28	Luke Brown (2) and Danny Little Bear	June 30, 1969 or July 31, 1969	CSW show	Kansas City, Kansas	1	(Note: The date the championship was won has not been documented which means the championship reign lasted anywhere between 50 days and 173 days)		
—	Vacated	September 19, 1969	—	N/A	—	—	Championship was vacated when Luke Brown walked out on Danny Little Bear during a match.	
29	Danny Little Bear (2) and Stan Pulaski	September 18, 1969	CSW show	Kansas City, Kansas	1	14	Defeated Tarzan Tyler and The Great Kojika in the finals of a tournament.	
30	Luke Brown (3) and The Ox	October 2, 1969	CSW show	Kansas City, Kansas	1	36		
31	Danny Little Bear (3) and The Viking (5)	November 7, 1969	CSW show	St. Joseph, Missouri	1	13		
32	K.O. Kox (3) and Killer Karl Kox	November 20, 1969	CSW show	Kansas City, Kansas	1	(Note: The date the championship was lost has not been documented which means the championship reign lasted anywhere between 1 day and 88 days)		
33	Bob Geigel (9) and The Stomper (2)	February 16, 1970 (NLT)	CSW show		1	(Note: The date the championship was won has not been documented which means the championship reign lasted anywhere between 16 days and 103 days)		
34	K.O. Kox (4) and Killer Karl Kox	March 4, 1970 (NLT)	CSW show		2	(Note: The date the championship was won has not been documented which means the championship reign lasted anywhere between 47 days and 62 days)		
35	Bob Geigel (10) and The Stomper (3)	April 13, 1970	CSW show	St. Joseph, Missouri	2	7		
36	K.O. Kox (5) and Killer Karl Kox	April 20, 1970	CSW show	St. Joseph, Missouri	3	(Note: The date the championship was lost has not been documented which means the championship reign lasted anywhere between 1 day and 25 days)		
Championship history is unrecorded from April 20, 1970 to May 15, 1970.
37	Harley Race and Baron von Raschke	May 15, 1970 (NLT)	CSW show		1	(Note: The date the championship was won and 'ost has not been documented which means the championship reign lasted anywhere between 113 days and 156 days)	Records are not clear on who Race and Von Raschke defeated to win the championship	
38	Danny Little Bear (4) and Rufus R. Jones	September 1970	CSW show		1	(Note: The date the championship was won and lost has not been documented which means the championship reign lasted anywhere between 1 day and 132 days)		
Championship history is unrecorded from September 1970 to November 27, 1970.
39	Rufus R. Jones (2) and The Stomper (4)	November 27, 1970 (NLT)	CSW show		1	(Note: The date the championship was lost has not been documented which means the championship reign lasted anywhere between 21 days and 78 days)		
Championship history is unrecorded from November 27, 1970 to December 18, 1970.
40	Rock Hunter and Roger Kirby (2)	December 18, 1970 (NLT)	CSW show		1	(Note: The date the championship was lost has not been documented which means the championship reign lasted anywhere between 1 day and 20 days)		
Championship history is unrecorded from December 18, 1970 to March 19, 1971.
41	John Tolos and Baron Von Heisinger	March 19, 1971 (NLT)	CSW show		1	(Note: The date the championship was won and lost has not been documented which means the championship reign lasted anywhere between 1 day and 110 days)	Defeated Pat O’Conner and Danny Little Bear.	
42	Bob Geigel (11) and The Stomper (5)	April 9, 1971 (NLT)	CSW show		3	(Note: The date the championship was won and lost has not been documented which means the championship reign lasted anywhere between 53 days and 102 days)		
43	Buddy Austin and Bob Orton	June 1971	N/A		1	(Note: The date the championship was lost has not been documented which means the championship reign lasted anywhere between 43 days and 72 days)		
44	Steve Bolus and Rufus R. Jones (3)	August 12, 1971	CSW show	Kansas City, Kansas	1	(Note: The date the championship was lost has not been documented which means the championship reign lasted anywhere between 1 day and 64 days)		
45	Yasu Fuji and Chati Yokouchi	October 15, 1971 (NLT)	CSW show		1	(Note: The date the championship was lost has not been documented which means the championship reign lasted anywhere between 35 days and 98 days)		
46	The Stomper (6) and The Viking (6)	November 19, 1971	CSW show	St. Joseph, Missouri	1	(Note: The date the championship was lost has not been documented which means the championship reign lasted anywhere between 1 day and 19 days)		
47	Yasu Fuji and Chati Yokouchi	December 8, 1971 (NLT)	CSW show		2	(Note: The date the championship was won has not been documented which means the championship reign lasted anywhere between 50 days and 68 days)		
48	Omar Atlas and Danny Little Bear (5)	January 27, 1972	CSW show	Kansas City, Kansas	1	14		
49	Yasu Fuji and Chati Yokouchi	February 10, 1972	CSW show	Kansas City, Kansas	3	28		
50	Omar Atlas and Danny Little Bear (6)	March 9, 1972	CSW show	Kansas City, Kansas	2	2		
51	Yasu Fuji and Chati Yokouchi	March 11, 1972	CSW show	Wichita, Kansas	4	41		
52	Danny Little Bear (7) and The Stomper (7)	April 21, 1972	CSW show	St. Joseph, Missouri	1	69		
53	Black Angus Campbell] and Roger Kirby (3)	June 29, 1972	CSW show	Kansas City, Kansas	1	111		
54	Rufus R. Jones (4) and The Stomper (8)	October 18, 1972	CSW show	Kansas City, Kansas	2	15		
55	Roger Kirby (4) and Harley Race (2)	November 2, 1972	CSW show	Kansas City, Kansas	1	73		
56	Bob Geigel (12) and Rufus R. Jones (5)	February 1, 1973	CSW show	Kansas City, Kansas	1	35		
57	Great Togo and Tokyo Joe	March 8, 1973	CSW show	Kansas City, Kansas	1	0		
—		March 8, 1973	CSW show	Kansas City, Kansas			The championship was replaced with NWA World Tag Team Championship with Togo and Tokyo Joe's victory.	

== Team reigns by combined length ==
Key

Symbol	Meaning
¤	The exact length of at least one title reign is uncertain, so the shortest possible length is used.

Rank	Team	No. of reigns	Combined days
1	"Bulldog" Bob Brown and Bob Geigel	5	710¤
2	Don Slatton and Moose Evans	1	196¤
2	Ron Etchison and Sonny Myers	3	196
4	Yasu Fuji and Chati Yokouchi	1	154¤
5	Bob Geigel and The Viking	1	132
6	Harley Race and Baron von Raschke	1	113¤
7	Black Angus Campbell and Roger Kirby	1	111
8	Bob Geigel and Bill Miller	1	92
9	Doug Gilbert and Ron Reed	2	77¤
10	Bob Geigel and The Stomper	3	76¤
11	Roger Kirby and Harley Race	1	73
12	Jack Donovan and The Viking	1	70
13	Danny Little Bear and The Stomper	1	69
14	Sonny Myers and Pat O'Connor	2	64¤
15	Bob Ellis and The Stomper	1	56
16	Luke Brown and Danny Little Bear	1	50¤
17	The Outlaws (Dick Murdoch and Dusty Rhodes)	1	50
18	K.O. Kox and Killer Karl Kox	3	49¤
19	Bob Geigel and Dutch Savage	1	46
20	K.O. Kox and Dick Murdoch	2	46¤
21	Buddy Austin and Bob Orton	1	43¤
22	Luke Brown and The Ox	1	36
23	Rufus R. Jones and The Stomper	2	36¤
24	Bob Geigel and Rufus R. Jones	1	35
25	Roger Kirby and The Viking	1	35
26	Ron Etchison and Klondike Bill	1	21
27	Luke Brown and Tor Kamata	1	17
28	Omar Atlas and Danny Little Bear	2	16
29	Bob Ellis and The Viking	1	14
30	Danny Little Bear and Stan Pulaski	1	14¤
31	Danny Little Bear and The Viking	1	13
32	Terry Martin and Tommy Martin	1	7
33	Danny Little Bear and Rufus R. Jones	1	1¤
34	John Tolos and Baron Von Heisinger	1	1¤
35	Rock Hunter and Roger Kirby	1	1¤
36	Rocky Hamilton and Dutch Savage	1	1¤
37	Steve Bolus and Rufus R. Jones	1	1¤
38	The Stomper and The Viking	1	1¤
39	Great Togo and Tokyo Joe	1	0

== Individual reigns by combined length ==
Key

Symbol	Meaning
¤	The exact length of at least one title reign is uncertain, so the shortest possible length is used.

Rank	Wrestler	No. of reigns	Combined days
1	Bob Geigel	12	1,091¤
2	"Bulldog" Bob Brown	5	710¤
3	Ron Etchison	4	582
4	The Viking	6	265¤
5	The Stomper	8	238¤
6	Roger Kirby	4	220¤
7	Sonny Myers	5	217¤
8	Don Slatton	1	196¤
9	Harley Race	2	196¤
10	Moose Evans	1	196¤
11	Danny Little Bear	7	163¤
12	Chati Yokouchi	1	154¤
13	Yasu Fuji	1	154¤
14	Baron von Raschke	1	113¤
15	Black Angus Campbell	1	111
16	Luke Brown	3	103¤
17	Dick Murdoch	3	96¤
18	K.O. Kox	5	95¤
19	Bill Miller	1	92
20	Doug Gilbert	2	77¤
21	Ron Reed	2	77¤
22	Rufus R. Jones	5	73¤
23	Bob Ellis	2	70
24	Jack Donovan	1	70
25	Pat O'Connor	2	64¤
26	Dusty Rhodes	1	50
27	Killer Karl Kox	3	49¤
28	Dutch Savage	2	47¤
29	Bob Orton	1	43¤
30	Buddy Austin	1	43¤
31	The Ox	1	36
32	Klondike Bill	1	21
33	Tor Kamata	1	17
34	Omar Atlas	2	16
35	Stan Pulaski	1	14¤
36	Terry Martin	1	7
37	Tommy Martin	1	7
38	Baron Von Heisinger	1	1¤
39	John Tolos	1	1¤
40	Rock Hunter	1	1¤
41	Rocky Hamilton	1	1¤
42	Steve Bolus	1	1¤
43	Great Togo	1	0
44	Tokyo Joe	1	0

== See also ==
- National Wrestling Alliance
- NWA World Tag Team Championship (Central States version)
- NWA Central States Tag Team Championship
- NWA North American Tag Team Championship
