= NWA Central States Heavyweight Championship =

Professional wrestling championship

Details
- Promotion: Central States Wrestling; NWA Central-States Championship Wrestling
- Date established: May 18, 1950
- Current champion: Mitch Johnson
- Date won: March 31, 2017

Other names
- NWA Heart of America Heavyweight Championship (1950–1953); Central States Heavyweight Championship (1953/10–1988); WWA Central States Heavyweight Championship (1988–1989)
Statistics
- First champion: Bill Longson
- Most reigns: "Bulldog" Bob Brown (19 reigns)
- Longest reign: Derek Stone (952 days)
- Shortest reign: Enrique Torres (Less than one day)
- Oldest champion: Rufus R. Jones (54 years, 13 days)
- Youngest champion: Shane Somers (19 years)

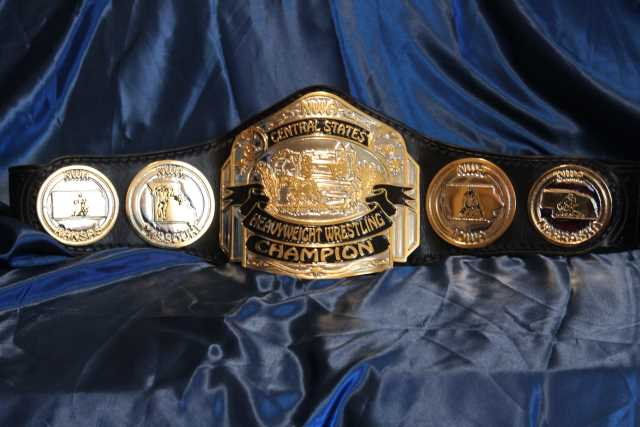
NWA Central States Heavyweight Championship belt

The NWA Central States championship was reactivated in 2002 seeing Shane Somers defeat. 7'1 Butch McClain becoming the 1st champion since 1989 & youngest at 19 years of age.

== Title history ==
Key
No.	Overall reign number
Reign	Reign number for the specific champion
Days	Number of days held

No.	Champion	Championship change			Reign statistics		Notes	Ref.
No.	Champion	Date	Event	Location	Reign	Days	Notes	Ref.
1	Bill Longson	August 18, 1950	CSW show	Kansas City, Kansas	1	160	Defeated Sonny Myers in tournament final to become first champion	
2	Tarzan Kowalski	January 25, 1951	CSW show	Kansas City, Kansas	1	91		
3	Dennis Clary	April 26, 1951	CSW show	Kansas City, Kansas	1	7		
4	Sonny Myers	May 3, 1951	CSW show	Kansas City, Kansas	1	7		
5	Dennis Clary	May 10, 1951	CSW show	Kansas City, Kansas	2	180		
6	Jimmy Coffield	November 6, 1951	CSW show	Topeka, Kansas	1	23		
7	Alo Leilani	November 29, 1951	CSW show	Kansas City, Kansas	1	21		
8	Bob Orton	December 20, 1951	CSW show	Kansas City, Kansas	1	70		
9	Enrique Torres	February 28, 1952	CSW show	Kansas City, Kansas	1	7		
10	Sonny Myers	March 6, 1952	CSW show	Kansas City, Kansas	2	(Note: The date the championship was vacated has not been documented which means the championship reign lasted anywhere between 1 day and 5,898 days)		
—	Vacated	1952	—	—	—	—	Championship vacated for undocumented reasons	
11	Sonny Myers	April 1952	CSW show	Wichita, Kansas		(Note: The date the championship was won and lost has not been documented which means the championship reign lasted anywhere between 1 day and 182 days)	Defeated Bob Orton in 13-man tournament final, but Orville Brown refuses to present him with the title because the final was only one fall	
12	Sonny Myers	1952	CSW show	(Note: The location of the match was not captured as part of the championship documentation.)	3	(Note: The date the championship was won and lost has not been documented which means the championship reign lasted anywhere between 1 day and 181 days)	Defeated Bob Orton in 3-fall match	
13	Red Berry	September 1952 (NLT)	CSW show		1	(Note: The date the championship was won and lost has not been documented which means the championship reign lasted anywhere between 1 day and 242 days)		
14	Bobby Lane	November 30, 1952	CSW show	Kansas City, Kansas	1	46		
15	Dave Sims	January 15, 1953	CSW show	Kansas City, Kansas	1	259		
16	Lenny Montana	October 1, 1953	CSW show		1	71		
17	Sonny Myers	December 11, 1953	CSW show	St. Joseph, Missouri	4	(Note: The date the championship was lost has not been documented which means the championship reign lasted anywhere between 21 days and 47 days)		
18	Dave Sims	January 1954	CSW show		2	(Note: The date the championship was won has not been documented which means the championship reign lasted anywhere between 1 day and 27 days)		
19	Bob Orton	January 28, 1954	CSW show	Kansas City, Kansas	2	(Note: The date the championship was lost has not been documented which means the championship reign lasted anywhere between 32 days and 62 days)		
20	Sonny Myers	March 1954	CSW show		5	(Note: The date the championship was won and lost has not been documented which means the championship reign lasted anywhere between 1 day and 196 days)		
Championship history is unrecorded from March 1954 to 1954.
22	El Toro	1954	CSW show		1	(Note: The date the championship was won and lost has not been documented which means the championship reign lasted anywhere between 1 day and 196 days)	Unknown whom El Toro defeated for the title	
23	Sonny Myers	1954	CSW show	Kansas City, Kansas	6	(Note: The date the championship was won and lost has not been documented which means the championship reign lasted anywhere between 1 day and 196 days)		
24	Joe Dusek	September 13, 1954	CSW show	Wichita, Kansas	1	94		
25	Ray Villmer	December 16, 1954	CSW show	Kansas City, Kansas	1	(Note: The date the championship was lost has not been documented which means the championship reign lasted anywhere between 1 day and −983 days)		
26	Lu Kim	(Note: The date of the title change is unknown, records indicate that Lu Kim defeated Ray Villmer for the championship, but not when or where)	CSW show		1	(Note: The date the championship was lost has not been documented which means the championship reign lasted anywhere between 1 day and −983 days)		
27	Ray Villmer	(Note: The date of the title change is unknown, records indicate that Ray Villmer defeated Lu Kim to regain e championship, but not when or where)	CSW show		2	(Note: The date the championship was lost has not been documented which means the championship reign lasted anywhere between 1 day and −983 days)		
Championship history is unrecorded from to April 1956 (NLT).
28	Mike DiBiase	April 1956 (NLT)	CSW show		1	(Note: The date the championship was lost has not been documented which means the championship reign lasted anywhere between 1 day and −983 days)	It is not documented whom DiBiase defeated to win the championship.	
29	Richard Brown	April 10, 1956	CSW show	Topeka, Kansas	1	(Note: The date the championship was lost has not been documented which means the championship reign lasted anywhere between 1 day and 274 days)		
Championship history is unrecorded from April 10, 1956 to 1956.
30	Mighty Atlas	1956	CSW show		1	(Note: The date the championship was won has not been documented which means the championship reign lasted anywhere between 1 day and 273 days)	Unknown whom Atlas defeated for the title	
Championship history is unrecorded from 1956 to February 1957 (NLT).
31	Sonny Myers	February 1957 (NLT)	CSW show		7	(Note: The date the championship was won and lost has not been documented which means the championship reign lasted anywhere between 1 day and 529 days)	It is not known whom Myers defeated for the championship	
Championship history is unrecorded from February 1957 (NLT) to 1957.
32	Richard Brown	1957	CSW show		2	(Note: The date the championship was won has not been documented which means the championship reign lasted anywhere between 1 day and 256 days)	Unknown whom Brown defeated for the title	
33	Red Berry	September 15, 1957	CSW show	Wichita, Kansas	2	22		
34	Richard Brown	October 7, 1957	CSW show	Wichita, Kansas	3	(Note: The date the championship was lost has not been documented which means the championship reign lasted anywhere between 86 days and 290 days)		
—	Vacated	1958	—	—	—	—	Championship vacated for undocumented reasons	
35	Sonny Myers	July 26, 1958	CSW show	St. Joseph, Missouri	8	(Note: The date the championship was lost has not been documented which means the championship reign lasted anywhere between 1 day and 68 days)		
—	Vacated	October 2, 1958 (NLT)	—	—	—	—	Championship vacated for undocumented reasons	
36	Bob Geigel	October 3, 1958	CSW show		1	56	Defeated Bob Ellis in tournament final	
37	“Cowboy” Bob Ellis	November 28, 1958	CSW show	St. Joseph, Missouri	1	420		
38	Lee Henning	January 22, 1960	CSW show	St. Joseph, Missouri	1	(Note: The date the championship was lost has not been documented which means the championship reign lasted anywhere between 1 day and 47 days)		
Championship history is unrecorded from January 22, 1960 to 1960.
39	Kinji Shibuya	1960	CSW show		1	(Note: The date the championship was won has not been documented which means the championship reign lasted anywhere between 1 day and 47 days)	Unknown whom Shibuya defeated for the title	
40	“Cowboy” Bob Ellis	March 10, 1960	CSW show	Kansas City, Kansas	2	(Note: The date the championship was lost has not been documented which means the championship reign lasted anywhere between 22 days and 51 days)		
41	Lee Henning	April 1960	CSW show		2	(Note: The date the championship was lost has not been documented which means the championship reign lasted anywhere between 27 days and 55 days)		
42	Thor Hagen	May 27, 1960	CSW show	St. Joseph, Missouri	1	(Note: The date the championship was lost has not been documented which means the championship reign lasted anywhere between 5 days and 34 days)		
43	Ricky Lee	June 1960	CSW show	St. Joseph, Missouri	1	(Note: The date the championship was lost has not been documented which means the championship reign lasted anywhere between 32 days and 90 days)		
44	Thor Hagen	August 1960	CSW show		2	(Note: The date the championship was won has not been documented which means the championship reign lasted anywhere between 30 days and 59 days)		
45	Mike Paidousis	September 29, 1960	CSW show	Kansas City, Kansas	1	50		
46	Lee Henning	November 18, 1960	CSW show	St. Joseph, Missouri	3	133		
47	Ron Etchison	March 31, 1961	CSW show	St. Joseph, Missouri	1	21		
48	Lee Henning	April 21, 1961	CSW show	St. Joseph, Missouri	4	(Note: The date the championship was lost has not been documented which means the championship reign lasted anywhere between 1 day and 40 days)		
49	“Cowboy” Bob Ellis	May 1961 (NLT)	CSW show		3	(Note: The date the championship was won or vacated has not been documented which means the championship reign lasted anywhere between 1 day and 40 days)		
—	Vacated	1961	—	—	—	—	Bob Ellis left the promotion without losing the championship first.	
50	Buddy Austin	June 2, 1961	CSW show		1	154	Awarded title	
51	Sonny Myers	November 3, 1961	CSW show	St. Joseph, Missouri	9	7		
52	Tarzan Tyler	November 10, 1961	CSW show	St. Joseph, Missouri	1	(Note: The date the championship was lost has not been documented which means the championship reign lasted anywhere between 1 day and 20 days)		
53	Buddy Austin	November 1961	CSW show		2	(Note: The date the championship was won has not been documented which means the championship reign lasted anywhere between 71 days and 100 days)		
54	Ray Gordon	February 9, 1962	CSW show	St. Joseph, Missouri	1	84		
55	Lee Henning	May 4, 1962	CSW show	St. Joseph, Missouri	5	(Note: The date the championship was lost has not been documented which means the championship reign lasted anywhere between 1 day and 180 days)		
56	Pat O'Connor	October 1962 (NLT)	CSW show		1	(Note: The date the championship was lost has not been documented which means the championship reign lasted anywhere between 2 days and 181 days)		
57	Lee Henning	November 2, 1961	CSW show	St. Joseph, Missouri	6	14		
57.5	Pat O'Connor	November 16, 1962	CSW show	St. Joseph, Missouri	2	(Note: The date the championship was lost has not been documented which means the championship reign lasted anywhere between 1 day and 77 days)		
—		May 17, 1963	—	St. Joseph, Missouri	1	217		
59	Sonny Myers	February 1, 1963	CSW show	St. Joseph, Missouri	10	105	Unknown whom Myers defeated for the title	
60	Rock Hunter	May 17, 1963	CSW show	St. Joseph, Missouri	1	217		
61	Enrique Torres	December 20, 1963	CSW show	St. Joseph, Missouri	2	0		
62	The Spoiler	December 20, 1963	CSW show	St. Joseph, Missouri	1	(Note: The date the championship was lost has not been documented which means the championship reign lasted anywhere between 1 day and 376 days)		
Championship history is unrecorded from December 20, 1963 to December 1964 (NLT).
63	Mike DiBiase	December 1964 (NLT)	CSW show		2	(Note: The date the championship was won has not been documented which means the championship reign lasted anywhere between 1 days and 387 days)	Unknown whom DiBiase defeated for the title	
64	Ron Reed	January 11, 1965	CSW show	St. Joseph, Missouri	1	144		
65	The Stomper	June 4, 1965	CSW show	St. Joseph, Missouri	1	30		
66	Sonny Myers	July 4, 1965	CSW show		11	187		
67	Bob Geigel	January 7, 1966	CSW show	St. Joseph, Missouri	2	42		
68	Ron Reed	February 18, 1966	CSW show	St. Joseph, Missouri	2	119		
69	The Viking	June 17, 1966	CSW show	St. Joseph, Missouri	1	182		
70	Mike DiBiase	December 16, 1966	CSW show	St. Joseph, Missouri	3	28		
71	Sonny Myers	January 13, 1967	CSW show	St. Joseph, Missouri	12	42		
72	Bob Geigel	February 24, 1967	CSW show	St. Joseph, Missouri	3	42		
73	The Viking	April 7, 1967	CSW show	St. Joseph, Missouri	2	63		
74	Sonny Myers	June 9, 1967	CSW show	St. Joseph, Missouri	13	140		
75	The Hangman	October 27, 1967	CSW show	St. Joseph, Missouri	1	21		
76	Bob Geigel	November 17, 1967	CSW show	St. Joseph, Missouri	4	25		
77	Sonny Myers	December 12, 1967	CSW show	St. Joseph, Missouri	14	115		
78	Harley Race	April 5, 1968	CSW show	St. Joseph, Missouri	1	28		
79	Ron Etchison	May 3, 1968	CSW show	St. Joseph, Missouri	2	7		
80	Roger Kirby	May 10, 1968	CSW show	St. Joseph, Missouri	1	(Note: The date the championship was lost has not been documented which means the championship reign lasted anywhere between 1 day and 21 days)		
—	Vacated	May 1968	—	—	—	—	Championship vacated for undocumented reasons	
81	"Bulldog" Bob Brown	June 4, 1968	CSW show	St. Joseph, Missouri	1	129	Defeated Thor Hagen in tournament final	
82	Tommy Martin	October 11, 1968	CSW show	St. Joseph, Missouri	1	63		
83	Dusty Rhodes	December 13, 1968	CSW show	St. Joseph, Missouri	1	28		
84	"Bulldog" Don Kent	January 10, 1969	CSW show	St. Joseph, Missouri	1	49		
85	Dick Murdoch	February 28, 1969	CSW show	St. Joseph, Missouri	1	112		
86	Pat O'Connor	June 20, 1969	CSW show	St. Joseph, Missouri	3	(Note: The date the championship was vacated has not been documented which means the championship reign lasted anywhere between 103 days and 133 days)		
—	Vacated	October 1969	—	—	—	—	Championship vacated for undocumented reasons	
87	Danny Little Bear	November 28, 1969	CSW show	St. Joseph, Missouri	1	126	Wins tournament	
88	Roger Kirby	April 3, 1970	CSW show	St. Joseph, Missouri	2	273		
89	Bob Geigel	January 1, 1971	CSW show	St. Joseph, Missouri	5	(Note: The date the championship was lost has not been documented which means the championship reign lasted anywhere between 1 days and −4,235 days)		
90	Harley Race	1971	CSW show		2	(Note: The date the championship was won and lost has not been documented which means the championship reign lasted anywhere between 1 days and −4,235 days)		
91	Bob Geigel	1971	CSW show		6	(Note: The date the championship was won and lost has not been documented which means the championship reign lasted anywhere between 1 days and −4,235 days)		
92	Harley Race	June 1971 (NLT)	CSW show		3	(Note: The date the championship was won has not been documented which means the championship reign lasted anywhere between 195 days and 373 days)	Pat O'Connor defeats Race for the title on January 28, 1972 in St. Louis, MO, but Race continues to be recognized by other promoters, and Sam Muchnick withdraws recognition of the title and later creates the Missouri Heavyweight title	
93	Danny Little Bear	January 11, 1972	CSW show	St. Joseph, Missouri	2	(Note: The date the championship was lost has not been documented which means the championship reign lasted anywhere between 1 day and 148 days)		
94	Black Angus Campbell	1972	CSW show		1	(Note: The date the championship was won has not been documented which means the championship reign lasted anywhere between 1 day and 148 days)		
95	The Stomper	June 8, 1972	CSW show		2	29		
96	Harley Race	July 7, 1971	CSW show	Kansas City, Kansas	4	506		
97	Omar Atlas	November 24, 1972	CSW show	St. Joseph, Missouri	1	(Note: The date the championship was lost has not been documented which means the championship reign lasted anywhere between 7 days and 37 days)		
98	Roger Kirby	December 1972	CSW show		1	(Note: The date the championship was lost has not been documented which means the championship reign lasted anywhere between 117 days and 147 days)		
99	Danny Little Bear	April 27, 1973	CSW show		3	(Note: The date the championship was lost has not been documented which means the championship reign lasted anywhere between 35 days and 64 days)		
100	"Bulldog" Bob Brown	June 1973	CSW show		2	(Note: The date the championship was lost has not been documented which means the championship reign lasted anywhere between 65 days and 94 days)		
101	Harley Race	September 22, 1973	CSW show	Kansas City, Kansas	5	19		
102	"Bulldog" Bob Brown	October 11, 1973	CSW show	Kansas City, Kansas	3	161		
103	Mike George	March 21, 1974	CSW show	Kansas City, Kansas	1	(Note: The date the championship was lost has not been documented which means the championship reign lasted anywhere between 72 days and 101 days)		
104	Roger Kirby	June 1974	CSW show		2	(Note: The date the championship was lost has not been documented which means the championship reign lasted anywhere between 1 day and 32 days)		
Championship history is unrecorded from June 1974 to July 4, 1974.
105	"Bulldog" Bob Brown	July 4, 1974	CSW show	Kansas City, Kansas	4	7	Defeated Don Fargo to win the championship, not clear if Fargo was the champion or if it was a tournament.	
106	Harley Race	July 11, 1974	CSW show	Kansas City, Kansas	6	21		
107	"Bulldog" Bob Brown	August 1, 1974	CSW show	Kansas City, Kansas	5	(Note: The date the championship was lost has not been documented which means the championship reign lasted anywhere between 188 days and 218 days)		
108	Terry Martin	December 1974	CSW show		1	(Note: The date the championship was lost has not been documented which means the championship reign lasted anywhere between 38 days and 68 days)		
109	Jerry Oates	February 7, 1975	CSW show	St. Joseph, Missouri	1	113		
110	Ed Wiskoski	May 31, 1975	CSW show	Kansas City, Kansas	1	257		
111	Mike George	February 12, 1976	CSW show	Kansas City, Kansas	2	58		
112	"Bulldog" Bob Brown	April 10, 1976	CSW show	Wichita, Kansas	6	7		
113	Mike George	April 17, 1976	CSW show	Wichita, Kansas	3	31		
114	"Bulldog" Bob Brown	May 18, 1976	CSW show	Topeka, Kansas	7	51		
115	Harley Race	July 8, 1976	CSW show	Kansas City, Kansas	7	59		
116	"Bulldog" Bob Brown	September 5, 1976	CSW show	Wichita, Kansas	8	18		
117	Rick Gibson	October 1, 1976	CSW show	St. Joseph, Missouri	1	(Note: The date the championship was lost has not been documented which means the championship reign lasted anywhere between 1 day and 122 days)		
Championship history is unrecorded from October 1, 1976 to January 1977.
118	Bob Slaughter	January 1977	CSW show		1	(Note: The date the championship was lost has not been documented which means the championship reign lasted anywhere between 4 days and 34 days)	Records are unclear on whom Slaughter defeated to win the championship	
119	Ted Oates	February 4, 1977	CSW show	St. Joseph, Missouri	1	7		
120	Bob Slaughter	February 11, 1977	CSW show	St. Joseph, Missouri	2	(Note: The date the championship was lost has not been documented which means the championship reign lasted anywhere between 1 day and 94 days)		
121	"Bulldog" Bob Brown	1977	CSW show		9	(Note: The date the championship was lost has not been documented which means the championship reign lasted anywhere between 1 day and 94 days)		
122	Bob Slaughter	1977	CSW show		3	(Note: The date the championship was lost has not been documented which means the championship reign lasted anywhere between 1 day and 93 days)		
123	Ted DiBiase	May 19, 1977	CSW show	Kansas City, Kansas	1	(Note: The date the championship was lost has not been documented which means the championship reign lasted anywhere between 1 day and 163 days)		
Championship history is unrecorded from May 19, 1977 to 1977.
124	Bob Sweetan	1977	CSW show		1	(Note: The date the championship was lost has not been documented which means the championship reign lasted anywhere between 1 day and 163 days)	Records are unclear on whom Sweetan defeated to win the championship	
125	"Bulldog" Bob Brown	October 30, 1977	CSW show	Topeka, Kansas	10	69		
126	Ted DiBiase	January 7, 1978	CSW show	Kansas City, Kansas	2	0		
127	Alexis Smirnoff	January 7, 1978	CSW show	Kansas City, Kansas	1	40		
128	Ken Lucas	February 16, 1978	CSW show	Kansas City, Kansas	1	70		
129	Bob Sweetan	April 27, 1978	CSW show	Kansas City, Kansas	2	126		
130	Doug Gilbert	August 31, 1978	CSW show	Kansas City, Kansas	1	37		
131	Buck Robley	October 7, 1978	CSW show	Des Moines, Iowa	1	84		
132	Dick Murdoch	December 30, 1978	CSW show	Kansas City, Kansas	2	3		
133	Randy Alls	January 2, 1979	CSW show	St. Joseph, Missouri	1	51		
134	Bob Sweetan	February 22, 1979	CSW show	Kansas City, Kansas	3	207		
135	Ron Starr	September 17, 1979	CSW show	Wichita, Kansas	1	17		
136	The Turk	October 4, 1979	CSW show	Kansas City, Kansas	1	49		
137	The Avenger	November 22, 1979	CSW show	Kansas City, Kansas	1	63		
138	The Assassin	January 24, 1980	CSW show	Kansas City, Kansas	1	11		
139	"Bulldog" Bob Brown	February 4, 1980	CSW show	Kansas City, Kansas	11	66		
140	Bruiser Brody	April 10, 1980	CSW show	Kansas City, Kansas	1	42		
141	Dick Murdoch	May 22, 1980	CSW show	Kansas City, Kansas	3	63		
142	Killer Karl Kox	July 24, 1980	CSW show	Kansas City, Kansas	1	23		
143	"Bulldog" Bob Brown	August 16, 1980	CSW show	Topeka, Kansas	12	26		
144	Mike George	September 11, 1980	CSW show	Kansas City, Kansas	4	42		
145	"Bulldog" Bob Brown	October 23, 1980	CSW show	Kansas City, Kansas	13	160		
146	Buzz Tyler	April 1, 1981	CSW show	Des Moines, Iowa	1	113		
147	Bob Sweetan	July 23, 1981	CSW show	Kansas City, Kansas	4	119		
148	Tommy Martin	November 19, 1981	CSW show	Kansas City, Kansas	2	21		
149	Bob Sweetan	December 10, 1981	CSW show	Kansas City, Kansas	5	4		
150	"Bulldog" Bob Brown	December 14, 1981	CSW show	Wichita, Kansas	14	(Note: The date the championship was lost has not been documented which means the championship reign lasted anywhere between 1 day and 133 days)		
—	Vacated	1981-1982	—	—	—	—	Championship vacated for undocumented reasons	
Championship history is unrecorded from 1981-1982 to April 27, 1982.
151	Roger Kirby	April 27, 1982	CSW show	St. Joseph, Missouri	3	142	Defeated Harley Race to win the championship. Records are unclear if Race was the champion or if this was for the vacant championship.	
152	Manny Fernandez	September 16, 1982	CSW show	Kansas City, Kansas	1	147		
153	Dewey Robertson	February 10, 1983	CSW show	Kansas City, Kansas	1	91		
154	"Bulldog" Bob Brown	May 12, 1983	CSW show	Kansas City, Kansas	15	7		
155	Dewey Robertson	May 19, 1983	CSW show	Kansas City, Kansas	2	14		
156	Harley Race	June 2, 1983	CSW show	Kansas City, Kansas	8	8		
—	Vacated	June 10, 1983	—	—	—	—	Harley Race wins the NWA World Heavyweight Championship and gave up the Central States Championship.	
157	Super Destroyer	June 30, 1983	CSW show	Kansas City, Kansas	1	112	Defeated Buck Robley in tournament final	
158	Buzz Tyler	October 20, 1983	CSW show	Kansas City, Kansas	2	98		
159	Tully Blanchard	January 26, 1984	CSW show	Kansas City, Kansas	1	14		
160	Buzz Tyler	February 9, 1984	CSW show	Kansas City, Kansas	3	70		
161	Luke Graham	April 19, 1984	CSW show	Kansas City, Kansas	1	63		
162	Ted Oates	June 21, 1984	CSW show	Kansas City, Kansas	2	51		
163	Buzz Tyler	August 11, 1984	CSW show	Kansas City, Kansas	4	56		
164	Hacksaw Higgins	October 6, 1984	CSW show	Kansas City, Kansas	1	19		
165	Harley Race	October 25, 1984	CSW show	Kansas City, Kansas	8	77		
166	Mr. Pogo	January 10, 1985	CSW show	Kansas City, Kansas	1	255		
167	Marty Jannetty	September 22, 1985	CSW show	Des Moines, Iowa	1	74		
168	Brett Sawyer	December 5, 1985	CSW show	Kansas City, Kansas	1	12		
169	"Bulldog" Bob Brown	December 17, 1985	CSW show	Ames, Iowa	16	164		
—	Vacated	May 30, 1986	—	—	—	—	Bob Brown was forced to vacate the championship due to an ankle injury	
170	The Shadow	May 30, 1986	CSW show	Des Moines, Iowa	1	2	Wins 13-man battle royal	
171	Marty Jannetty	June 1, 1986	CSW show	Marshalltown, Iowa	2	(Note: The date the championship was lost has not been documented which means the championship reign lasted anywhere between 1 day and 29 days)		
172	"Bulldog" Bob Brown	June 1986	CSW show		17	(Note: The date the championship was vacated has not been documented which means the championship reign lasted anywhere between 88 days and 117 days)		
—	Vacated	September 26, 1986	—	—	—	—	Jim Crockett Jr. buys out the promotion and begins to promote shows with wrestlers from his own territory as well as Central States regulars	
173	Sam Houston	November 16, 1986	CSW show	St. Louis, Missouri	1	48	Defeats Bill Dundee in a tournament final	
174	Bill Dundee	January 3, 1987	CSW show	Topeka, Kansas	1	55		
175	"Bulldog" Bob Brown	February 27, 1987	CSW show	Kansas City, Kansas	18	83		
176	Rufus R. Jones	May 21, 1987	CSW show	Kansas City, Kansas	1	50		
177	Porkchop Cash	July 10, 1987	CSW show	St. Joseph, Missouri	1	7		
178	Rufus R. Jones	July 17, 1987	CSW show	Kansas City, Kansas	2	72		
179	Earthquake Ferris	September 27, 1987	CSW show	Des Moines, Iowa	1	33		
180	"Bulldog" Bob Brown	October 30, 1987	CSW show	St. Joseph, Missouri	19	56		
181	Dave Peterson	December 25, 1987	CSW show	St. Joseph, Missouri	1	(Note: The date the championship was lost has not been documented which means the championship reign lasted anywhere between 1 day and 6 days)		
—	Vacated	1987	—	—	—	—	Championship vacated for undocumented reasons	
182	Dave Peterson	February 18, 1988	CSW show	Kansas City, Kansas	2	399	Defeated Cuban Assassin #2 for the held-up title; promotion withdraws from NWA in 1988	
183	Akio Sato	March 23, 1989	CSW show	Kansas City, Kansas	1	(Note: The date the championship abandoned has not been documented which means the championship reign lasted anywhere between 1 day and 283 days)	Defeated T.C. Carter to win the vacant championship	
—	Deactivated	1989	—	—	—	—	The Central States Wrestling promotion closed NWA relaunch as NWA Mid-West by Ed Chuman NWA Central States Championship re-instated 2/1/1999 3way match with Bashful Brad, Bloodlust and Butch Reed won by Butch Reed in Harrisonville Mo for MEW 6/99 in Bethany MO. Billy “KidUsa” won from Butch Reed 1/00 in Kansas City KS. Bloodlust won from Billy “KidUsa” 2/00 in Saint Joeseph MO. Quicksilver won from Bloodlust 3/00 in Joplin MO. Billy “KidUsa” won from Quicksilver 11/01 combined with MEW Central States Title Vacated in 2002 Won in Rolla Mo by showtime Shane Sommers	

== See also ==
- List of National Wrestling Alliance championships
