= Rufus R. Jones =

American professional wrestler

Personal information
- Born: Carey L. Lloyd; July 4, 1933 Clio, South Carolina, U.S.
- Died: November 13, 1993 (aged 60) Kansas City, Missouri, U.S.
- Children: 4, including Slick

Professional wrestling career
- Ring name: Rufus R. Jones
- Billed height: 6 ft 1 in (1.85 m)
- Billed weight: 273 lb (124 kg)
- Billed from: St. Louis, Missouri
- Debut: 1968
- Retired: 1988

Carey L. Lloyd (July 4, 1933 – November 13, 1993), also known by his ring name Rufus R. "Freight Train" Jones, was an American professional wrestler. He competed in the Central States, St. Louis and Mid-Atlantic regional promotions of the National Wrestling Alliance as well as the American Wrestling Association and All Japan Pro Wrestling during the 1970s and 1980s.

== Early life ==
Lloyd was born in Clio, South Carolina, and as a young boy, moved to a tenant home in Dillon. He also worked as a carpenter and attended South Carolina State University, where he played on the football team. He also got involved with boxing and competed as a Golden Gloves boxer, amassing a 32–3 record.

== Professional wrestling career ==
Lloyd trained to become a wrestler at the Tony Santos Boston Wrestling School. At the beginning of his career, he used the ring name Buster Lloyd, claiming to have learned how to fight on the corner of Lenox Avenue and 125th Street in Harlem. In this gimmick, he wrestled in Texas and criticized the local wrestlers as being inferior fighters to someone who grew up on the streets. He feuded with Tiger Conway, Sr., who emerged as the victor in the feud.

He made his professional wrestling debut in 1969, working in Eastern Canada for Grand Prix Wrestling in the Maritimes and International Wrestling in Montreal. In 1969, he wrestled in Japan for the Japan Pro Wrestling Alliance. Lloyd later adopted the ring name of Rufus R. Jones, and was nicknamed "Freight Train", which was also the name of his finisher consisting of two shoulder blocks followed by a headbutt. In interviews, he would tell opponents that his middle initial, R, stood for "guts". He formed a tag team with Burrhead Jones, who was billed as his cousin.

Jones then moved to Missouri to work for Sam Muchnick in the St. Louis Wrestling Club. He also competed for Heart of America Sports/Central States Wrestling. On September 10, 1970, he won his first championship by teaming with Danny Little Bear to win the Central States version of the NWA North American Tag Team Championship. He won the belt three more times with different partners, including Steve Bolus, The Stomper and Bob Geigel. On February 5, 1976, Jones wrestled NWA World Heavyweight Champion Terry Funk to a one-hour draw in Winston, Salem, until beating him via disqualification on July 6. He did not win the world title, but instead won the NWA Mid-Atlantic Television Championship on November 30 from Greg Valentine. He lost the title to Valentine on January 19, 1977, but regained it from him on February 11 until dropping the title on April 4 to Ric Flair.

Between 1972 and 1982, he worked for All Japan Pro Wrestling. He also had a short stint in Florida for Southeastern Championship Wrestling, winning the NWA Alabama Heavyweight Championship. Jones wrestled his final match in Puerto Rico for the World Wrestling Council (Capitol Sports Promotions), on September 10, 1988, at A Hot Night in Bayamon, where he and Jimmy Valiant defeated The Wild Samoans (Afa & Sika) by disqualification.

== Personal life ==
Carey Lloyd was married to Brooksie Jones Lloyd for thirty years. They had three daughters, Melaney, Crystal, and Kendall, as well as an adopted son, Kenneth Johnson, who worked for the World Wrestling Federation for many years as "The Doctor of Style" Slick. After Lloyd's retirement from wrestling, he worked with Bob Geigel in security at a dog-racing track in Kansas City, Kansas. He then opened a restaurant in 1991, named Rufus' Ringside Restaurant and Bar in Kansas City, Missouri.

On November 13, 1993, Lloyd died of a heart attack while hunting deer in Brunswick, Missouri; he was 60 years old. He had a wide number of lodge members and fans at his funeral, and masonic rituals were performed at the viewing of his body prior to burial.

== Championships and accomplishments ==
- NWA Central States Wrestling
  - NWA Central States Heavyweight Championship (2 times)
  - NWA Central States Tag Team Championship (3 times) – with Bob Brown (1 time), Dewey Robertson (1 time), and Mike George (1 time)
  - NWA Central States Television Championship (1 time)
  - NWA North American Tag Team Championship (Central States version) (5 times) – with Danny Little Bear (1 time), Steve Bolus (1 time), The Stomper (1 time), and Bob Geigel (2 times)
- Championship Wrestling from Florida
  - Bahamas Heavyweight Championship (1 time)
- Georgia Championship Wrestling
  - NWA Georgia Tag Team Championship (1 time) – with Norvell Austin
- NWA Mid-America
  - NWA Mid-America Heavyweight Championship ( 1 time )
  - NWA Southern Tag Team Championship (1 time ) - with Roughhouse Fargo
- Mid-Atlantic Championship Wrestling
  - NWA Mid-Atlantic Heavyweight Championship (1 time)
  - NWA Mid-Atlantic Tag Team Championship (1 time) – with Bugsy McGraw
  - NWA Mid-Atlantic Television Championship (2 times)
  - NWA World Tag Team Championship (Mid-Atlantic version) (1 time) – with Wahoo McDaniel
- Professional wrestling
  - World Negro Heavyweight Championship (1 time)
- Pro Wrestling Illustrated
  - PWI ranked him # 477 of the 500 best singles wrestlers of the PWI Years in 2003
- Pro Wrestling This Week
  - Wrestler of the Week (November 1–7, 1987)
- Southeastern Championship Wrestling
  - NWA Alabama Heavyweight Championship (1 time)
  - NWA Southeastern Tag Team Championship ( 1 time ) - with George Gulas
- WWE
  - WWE Hall of Fame (Class of 2018)
