= Roger Kirby (wrestler) =

American professional wrestler (1939–2019)

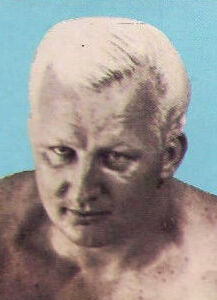
- Kirby, c. 1971

Personal information
- Born: Willis Kirby; December 14, 1939 Muncie, Indiana, U.S.
- Died: March 18, 2019 (aged 79) North Kansas City, Missouri, U.S.
- Cause of death: Pneumonia
- Children: 7
- Family: Les Thatcher (cousin)

Professional wrestling career
- Ring name(s): Roger Kirby; Rip Kirby; Bob Baker; Billy Baker; Cruiser
- Billed height: 5 ft 10 in (178 cm)
- Billed weight: 242 lb (110 kg)
- Billed from: Dunkirk, Indiana
- Trained by: Dick the Bruiser; The Sheik
- Debut: 1960
- Retired: 1986

Willis Kirby (December 14, 1939 – March 18, 2019), better known by the ring name Roger Kirby, was an American professional wrestler who competed throughout the United States, Mexico and Puerto Rico. He primarily competed within the National Wrestling Alliance, where he is a former NWA World Junior Heavyweight Champion, and also competed in promotions such as the World Wrestling Association, the World Wrestling Federation and Empresa Mexicana de Lucha Libre. Fellow wrestlers have called Kirby "one of the greatest performers to ever work in the squared circle".

== Early life ==
Willis Kirby was born on December 14, 1939, in Muncie, Indiana, and raised in Dunkirk, Indiana. He is a cousin of fellow professional wrestler Les Thatcher

== Professional wrestling career ==
A Golden Gloves boxer prior to entering professional wrestling, Kirby was trained in grappling by Dick the Bruiser and The Sheik in Indianapolis. After graduating in 1957, Kirby attended a wrestling event at his high school, where he got into an altercation with Ron Shire for standing on the ring apron. After telling his mother about this, he was informed that his cousin's husband was a wrestler named "Cowboy" Dennis Hall. That Sunday, Kirby visited Hall and soon thereafter was wrestling as Wild Bill Baker. He worked at a glass factory while he underwent his wrestling training and four years later he was working full-time as a professional wrestler. As was custom prior to the 1990s due to kayfabe, Kirby would often accept if he was challenged at a bar. Despite being almost 6 feet and 230lbs, Kirby stated that he "was very aggressive because (he was) small, and stayed in shape so (he) could be aggressive."

Kirby made his name wrestling through the territories of Georgia, Florida, Oregon, Minnesota and Kansas City (where he lived until his death). He was a prolific traveller, competing throughout the National Wrestling Alliance. With blonde hair and a resemblance to his close friend Buddy Rogers he took on the moniker "Nature Boy", wrestling as a heel and taking on numerous world champions, including Pat O'Connor. He also wrestled overseas in Mexico and Puerto Rico, along with six tours wrestling in Japan. Fellow wrestler and booker Bill Howard has stated that "Roger was the best there ever was. He could do everything that they're doing today, and probably even better. He had the body, the looks, the arrogance."

In 1967, Kirby won his first championship, when he and Les Thatcher won the NWA (Mid-America) United States Tag Team Championship. He would achieve success as a tag team competitor throughout the Mid America and Gulf Coast territories throughout the same year, winning the NWA Gulf Coast Tag Team Championship three times and the NWA (Gulf Coast) United States Tag Team Championship, all with his relative, Dennis Hall. For the rest of the 1960s, he became a successful singles competitor throughout the American South, becoming a prominent star in the Central States and Pacific Northwest territories. He defeated Ron Etchison on August 12, 1969, to capture the NWA Central States Heavyweight Championship and won the NWA Pacific Northwest Heavyweight Championship two times (both with victories over Moondog Mayne) the following year in 1969.

On May 20, 1971, Kirby defeated Danny Hodge to become the NWA World Junior Heavyweight Champion. Bill Watts had decided that Kirby was the man to carry the Junior Heavyweight Championship, which he went on to lose to Ramon Torres. Hodge called Kirby a "first class" wrestler who had "the right personality, the right actions, the right steps". In turn, Kirby stated that Hodge was the toughest man he ever wrestled with. As champion, Kirby worked extensive programmes with Tom Jones, with whom he started with wrestling in Indiana. "We sold out everything we touched", Kirby remarked about his bouts with Jones.

Kirby continued to capture NWA championships throughout the 1970s and on April 1, 1978, he teamed with Igor Volkoff to win the WWA Tag Team Championship. The following year he won the titles on two more occasions, both times with Paul Christy.

Roger Kirby briefly wrestled for the World Wrestling Federation in 1986 (where he also refereed a few matches in Kansas City) but gave it up and retired from the wrestling business, stating that he "wanted to be remembered as a top wrestler", feeling that the time of his in-ring retirement had come. He stated "I'd done everything that I wanted to do...I didn't want to go back down the ladder."

== Personal life ==
After retirement, Kirby had both knees and hips replaced along with his shoulder. In 2010, he was honoured by the Cauliflower Alley Club and was awarded their annual Men's Wrestling Award. He lived in Grandview, Missouri, a suburb of Kansas City where he bred exotic fish and enjoyed amateur photography. He was married and had seven children. Kirby died on March 18, 2019, due to complications from pneumonia brought on by stage-four pancreatic cancer.

== Championships and accomplishments ==
- Capitol Sports Promotions
  - WWC North American Heavyweight Championship (1 time)
  - NWA North American Tag Team Championship (Puerto Rico/WWC version) (1 time)
- Cauliflower Alley Club
  - 2010 Men's Wrestling Award
- 'Championship Wrestling from Florida
  - NWA Florida Tag Team Championship (5 times)
- Georgia Championship Wrestling
  - NWA Georgia Tag Team Championship (1 time)
- Gulf Coast Championship Wrestling
  - NWA United States Tag Team Championship (Gulf Coast version)
  - NWA Gulf Coast Tag Team Championship (3 times)
- Pacific Northwest Wrestling
  - NWA Pacific Northwest Heavyweight Championship (2 times)
  - NWA Pacific Northwest Tag Team Championship (1 time)
- National Wrestling Alliance
  - NWA World Junior Heavyweight Championship (1 time)
- NWA Central States Wrestling
  - NWA World Tag Team Championship (2 times) – with Lord Alfred Hayes
  - NWA Central States Heavyweight Championship (5 times)
  - NWA Central States Tag Team Championship (5 times)
  - NWA Central States Television Championship (2 times)
  - NWA North American Tag Team Championship (Central States version) (4 times)
  - NWA Heart of America Championship ( 1 time )
  - NWA United States Championship (Central States version) (2 times)
- NWA Mid-America
  - NWA United States Tag Team Championship (Mid-America version)
  - NWA Mid-America Heavyweight Championship (Tennessee/Alabama) (2 times)
  - AWA Southern Tag Team Championship (NWA Mid-America) (2 times)
- NWA Western States Sports
  - NWA Western States Heavyweight Championship (1 time)
  - NWA Western States Tag Team Championship (1 time ) - with Doug Somers
- Western States Alliance
  - WSA Heavyweaght Championship (2 times )
- World Wrestling Association
  - WWA World Tag Team Championship (3 times)
- Other titles:
  - Fort Myers Heavyweight Championship (2 times )
