= Assassins (professional wrestling) =

Professional wrestling tag team

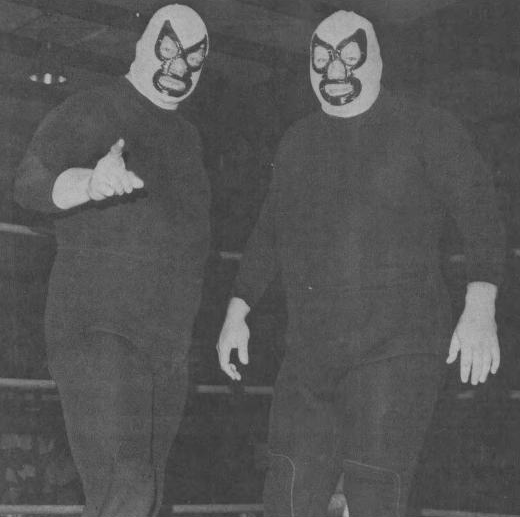
- Jody Hamilton and Randy Colley as The Assassins, circa 1980

Tag team
- Members: Jody Hamilton; Tom Renesto
- Name(s): Assassins; The Masked Assassins; Bolo and the Great Bolo
- Billed heights: Hamilton: 6 ft 1 in (1.85 m); Renesto: 6 ft 1 in (1.85 m)
- Former members: Roger Smith; Randy Colley; Kurt Von Hess; Hercules Hernandez; Ray Fambrough

The Assassins were a masked professional wrestling tag team from the 1960s to the 1980s. Jody Hamilton, the original Assassin, was a member throughout the various incarnations of the team, teaming with Tom Renesto, Roger Smith, Randy Colley, Hercules Hernandez and Ray Fambrough while donning the masks.

== Career ==
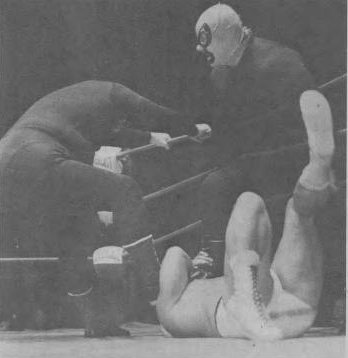
The Assassins double team Mr. Wrestling II during a tag match, circa 1980

The team had its origins in 1961 in the Georgia territory, when Hamilton, a five-year veteran, first began competing in Atlanta as the Assassin. Shortly afterward, Tom Renesto arrived in the area and began teaming with Hamilton to form the original Assassins team.

Hamilton and Renesto became a well-traveled heel tandem through the 1960s, competing in the Mid-Atlantic territory, Georgia, Florida, California, Arizona, the Pacific Northwest, Canada, Japan and Australia among other areas, and winning championship gold along the way. They returned to Georgia in 1968 and wrestled primarily in that state until 1974; they spent the majority of their time competing in Georgia Championship Wrestling during that time, but they also went to work for an independent group called the All-South Wrestling Alliance, with Hamilton going solo at first while Renesto worked behind the scenes, then facing off in opposite corners from each other, then reuniting as babyfaces before All-South closed in late 1974.

After Renesto retired from the ring, Hamilton continued The Assassins with new partners in later years, teaming up with Roger Smith and then Randy Colley, before forming the 1980s version of the masked team with Hercules Hernandez in Jim Crockett Promotions, under the management of Paul Jones, who used them as part of his feud with the popular Jimmy Valiant. That version of the team lasted until Hernandez was unmasked after losing to Valiant in a mask vs. hair match at a JCP/Maple Leaf Wrestling show in Toronto, Ontario, on April 15, 1984. Barry Orton replaced Hernandez as Assassin #3 for a few months. Hamilton continued on solo after Barry left JCP, breaking his ties with Jones to turn babyface once again and feud with his former manager, which climaxed with Hamilton teaming with Buzz Tyler to beat Jones' Zambuie Express (Elijah Akeem and Kareem Muhammed) at Starrcade 1984 in Greensboro, North Carolina.

== Post-wrestling ==
Jody Hamilton wound down his in-ring career in the Alabama territory competing under a different identity as The Flame before starting up his own promotion in Georgia, Deep South Wrestling, in 1986, which he ran for about two years before selling the promotion. He then opened up the Power Plant as a training facility for World Championship Wrestling and was last seen reprising his Assassin role as the manager of Pretty Wonderful (Paul Orndorff and Paul Roma) in WCW in 1994. Hamilton reopened Deep South Wrestling in 2005 to serve as a developmental territory for World Wrestling Entertainment, but WWE severed its developmental deal with DSW on April 18, 2007, and Hamilton continued running the promotion on his own as an independent until he folded DSW shortly after its October 11, 2007, event. Hamilton died on August 3, 2021 at 82.

Tom Renesto retired from wrestling in 1974. On April 25, 2000, Renesto died at 72 years old.

Randy Colley went on to form The Moondogs tag team (as Moondog Rex), which competed in the then-WWF and in the Memphis area, and he was also the original Demolition Smash. He also competed in Mid-South Wrestling as the masked Nightmare, wearing the same mask he had as one of the Assassins. He retired in 1996 and died on December 14, 2019, at age 69.

Roger Smith went on to fame in Memphis in the mid-1980s under the ring name Dirty Rhodes (for his resemblance to Dusty Rhodes in both appearance and mannerisms), both as a heel and a babyface. He has also since retired.

Hercules Hernandez went on to fame under that name in World Class Championship Wrestling, Florida, the WWF and Japan, as the masked Mr. Wrestling III in Mid-South, and as the masked Super Invader in WCW. He died in his sleep of a heart attack in Tampa, Florida, on March 6, 2004, at age 47.

Jim Ross stated that the Masked Assassins "were the greatest tag team that [he] ever saw."

== Championships and accomplishments ==
=== Hamilton and Renesto ===
- Championship Wrestling from Florida

- NWA United States Tag Team Championship (Florida version) (2 times)

- Georgia Championship Wrestling

- NWA Georgia Tag Team Championship (12 times)
- NWA Macon Tag Team Championship (2 times)
- NWA Southeastern Tag Team Championship (Georgia version) (4 times)
- NWA Southern Tag Team Championship (Georgia version) (1 time)
- NWA World Tag Team Championship (Georgia version) (1 time)

- NWA All-Star Wrestling

- NWA Canadian Tag Team Championship (Vancouver version) (2 times)
- NWA World Tag Team Championship (Vancouver version) (1 time)

- NWA Mid-America

- NWA World Tag Team Championship (Mid-America version) (1 time)

- NWA Tri-State
  - NWA Louisiana Tag Team Championship (1 time)
- World Championship Wrestling (Australia)

- IWA World Tag Team Championship (1 time)

- Professional Wrestling Hall of Fame

- Class of 2013

- Wrestling Observer Newsletter

- Wrestling Observer Newsletter Hall of Fame (Class of 2015)

=== Hamilton and Colley ===
- Georgia Championship Wrestling

- NWA Georgia Tag Team Championship (2 times)

== Media ==
Books

- Hamilton, Jody; Scott Teal (2006). Assassin: The man behind the mask (1st ed.). Crowbar Press. ISBN 0-9745545-3-7. Archived from the original on 2007-09-16.
