= Gil Hayes =

Canadian professional wrestler (1939–2022)

Personal information
- Born: Gilbert Lee Hayes; October 20, 1939 Fort Frances, Ontario, Canada
- Died: July 28, 2022 (aged 82) Fort Frances, Ontario, Canada

Professional wrestling career
- Ring name(s): Gil Hayes; Gabby Hayes
- Billed height: 5 ft 10 in (178 cm)
- Billed weight: 247 lb (112 kg)
- Debut: 1966
- Retired: December 29, 1985

Gilbert Lee Hayes (October 20, 1939 – July 28, 2022) was a Canadian professional wrestler who competed in North American promotions during the 1960s and 1970s including All-Star Wrestling and Stampede Wrestling where he remained a mainstay for the majority of his 17-year career. One of the first Canadian professional wrestlers to compete in Puerto Rico, he also frequently toured Japan with International Wrestling Enterprise during the mid-to-late 1970s.

He was also the first man to simultaneously hold two Canadian wrestling championships, the Stampede North American Heavyweight and International Tag Team Championship, at one time.

== Early life ==
Hayes was born in Fort Frances, Ontario on October 20, 1939. Growing up, he was a fan of professional wrestling (as was his mother) and was later involved in amateur wrestling and boxing during his teenage years.

== Professional wrestling career ==
=== Early career ===
In 1966, after meeting Gene Kiniski following a wrestling event in Winnipeg, Manitoba, Hayes began training in the basement of a local church for almost a year before making his professional wrestling debut at the St. Boniface Club in Winnipeg, Manitoba.

=== Stampede Wrestling ===
Hayes spent two years wrestling in Winnipeg as well as a brief stint in NWA Central States before moving to Calgary-based Stampede Wrestling during the late 1960s. Developing a following among fans as an egotistical anti-hero during the next several years, he teamed with Bill Dromo to defeat Jerry and Bobby Christy for the Stampede International Tag Team Championship on February 13, 1970.

Successfully defending the titles against Gordon Ivey, Mighty Ursus and "Cowboy" Dan Kroffat, he and Dromo eventually lost the titles back to Jerry and Bobby Christy on March 6. Hayes continued facing Jerry and Bobby Christy in tag-team and single matches during the next weeks, as well as facing Stu Hart and Bob Lueck in a tag team match with Buck Jones on March 24, before teaming with Bob Sweetan to recapture the titles from the Christy Brothers on July 3. Defeating Jerry and Bobby Christy in later rematches, Hayes and Sweetan held the tag team titles for over two months before losing them to Bud and Ray Osborne on September 4. Fighting to a time limit draw against Danny Babich on October 30, he also faced Paul Peller and Bob Prire later that year.

In early 1971, Hayes faced Bob Sweetan in several matches in January and twice teamed with Jean Antone in a mixed tag team match against Betty Niccoli & Paul Peller in early February. Also teaming with Danny Babich against Joe Tommaso & Ed Sullivan, Hayes also faced Buck Jones, The Stomper, the Quebec Giant, Dan Kroffat and Stampede North American Champion Les Thornton, losing to him on April 23.

In September, he also faced Carlos Belafonte, Dick Medrano and Frank Butcher before teaming with Dick Medranto against Ed Sullivan & Frank Butcher on October 1. Fighting to a draw against Earl Black on October 9, he also teamed with John Anson against Earl Black & Joe Tomasso on October 23 only to face his tag team partner several days later teaming with Dick Medrano and Nick Pacchiano against Anson and Sterling Gaylord.

He teamed with Danny Babich later during the year although they lost to Stampede International Tag Team Champions Chin Lee & Sugi Sito on November 19. He and Babich continued teaming together against Sterling Gaylord & Bob Pirie and also defeated Karl Krupp by disqualification on December 4, 1971. He also teamed with Bob Pringle and Gordon Ivey in a 6-man tag team match losing to Eddie Sullivan, Joe Tomasso and Paul Peller later that month.

Fighting to a time limit draw against Danny Babich on February 2, later that month he teamed with Bob Pringle to defeat Frank Butcher & Eddie Sullivan and also challenged Stampede International Tag Team Champions Chin Lee & Sugi Sito fighting them to a double disqualification with Carlos Belafonte on February 19. He later had a falling out with Pringle however, defeating him on April 15. After winning the tag team titles with Sonny Rogers, Hayes also faced Pringle in several tag team matches with Tiger Joe Tomasso during the next few weeks. On June 24, he and Tomasso also teamed with Beautiful Bruce in a 6-man tag team match losing to Dave Ruhl, Geoff Portz and Les Thornton.

=== All-Star Wrestling ===
During the summer of 1972, Hayes began wrestling in the Vancouver-area for promoter Sandor Kovacs. Fighting to a draw against Buck Ramstead on July 31, he also faced Jack Bence and Eddie Morrow in early August, also fighting to a draw with Morrow on August 14. A week later, Hayes lost a 6-man tag team match with John Quinn and "Bulldog" Bob Brown against Buck Ramstead, Dutch Savage and Dean Higuchi on August 21.

Facing Buck Ramstead, Dean Higuchi and Tito Montez in singles matches during late August and early September, later that month Hayes also teamed with John Quinn to defeat Duncan McTavish & Eddie Morrow on September 18. Defeating Fred Barron on September 25, he and Ray Glenn lost to Buck Ramstead & Steven Little Bear on October 2. Teaming with Ray Glenn and Dan Morgan over the next several weeks, he wrestled his last match in the promotion losing to Buck Ramstead on October 16.

=== Return to Calgary ===
By early November, he had returned to Stampede Wrestling and soon began teaming once again with Tiger Joe Tomasso winning the tag team titles from "Cowboy" Dan Kroffat & Lennie Hurst later that month. Facing Carlos Belafonte, Geoff Portz and Gino Caruso in a 6-man tag team with Tomasso and Tor Kamata in Swift Current, Saskatchewan on November 30, they defended their titles in rematches against Dan Kroffat & Lennie Hurst as well as George Gordienko & Lindy Calder before losing the titles to Michel Martel & Danny Babich on December 15, 1972.

The following year, he faced Dan Kroffat once again defeating Kroffat & Bill Cody for the Stampede International Tag Team titles with Benny Ramirez in July and, the following month, defeated him for the Stampede North American Heavyweight Championship in Lethbridge, Alberta on August 27. Three days later however, he and Ramirez lost the tag team titles to The Samoans (Afa & Sika) on August 31.

Feuding over the Stampede North American Heavyweight Championship with Dan Kroffat throughout the fall, he briefly lost the title to Kroffat on October 13 before regaining it several weeks later. He eventually lost the title to Omar Atlas on November 9, 1973.

=== World Wrestling Council ===
From Calgary, he also began to compete outside of Canada during the mid-1970s and became one of the first Canadians to wrestle in Puerto Rico with the World Wrestling Council later becoming the first WWC North American Heavyweight Champion in April 1974. During the next several months, with the promotion in financial trouble, Hayes suggested bringing in a trained bear as an opponent to defend his title against. Agreeing to the idea, the match received considerable press coverage and was later aired on television with Hayes defeating Victor, the Wrestling Bear in the main event on June 29, 1974. Hayes wrestled on and off for WWC during the next several years and eventually defeated Jose Rivera for the WWC Caribbean Heavyweight Championship in Bayamón, Puerto Rico on October 21. After losing the title to Chief War Cloud on November 25, he eventually parted with the company on bad terms.

Losing the WWC North American Heavyweight title to Carlos Colon in Caguas, Puerto Rico the following month, he enjoyed a short stay in Championship Wrestling from Florida fighting to a time limit draw against Johnny Gray in Miami Beach, Florida on August 21. During the next several months, he faced Vic Rosettani, Tony Parisi and Dominic DeNucci before leaving the area by late November, before returning to Stampede Wrestling in late 1974.

Failing to defeat Stampede International Tag Team Champions Pat and Mike Kelly with Gordon Ivey on December 27, he briefly feuded with Ivey facing him in a singles match on January 24, 1975. Also facing former tag team partner Benny Ramirez the following week, he began teaming with Mr. Hito facing Lindy Calder & Roy Callender on February 7, he and Mr. Hito lost to Callender and Wayne Bridges in Melville, Saskatchewan on April 22. Splitting from Mr. Hito for a time, he faced Frankie Laine, Keith Hart and Bill Cody before teaming with Jack Pesek against Bill Cody & Nick Pacchiano on May 23. He teamed once more with Pesek against Bill Cody & Keith Hart on May 30.

He and Mr. Hito eventually began teaming together facing Larry Lane & Alo Leilani on August 8. With Dutch Savage, he and Mr. Hito also faced Larry Lane, Bob Pringle and Keith Hart in a 6-man tag team match on September 20. Later that year, he won the vacant Stampede Wrestling International Tag Team titles with Mr. Hito in a championship tournament on December 12, 1975. Losing the titles to Ed & Jerry Morrow later that month, he and Mr. Hito regained the titles once more defeating Keith Hart & Bob Pringle in Calgary on April 10.

=== Japan ===
Appearing at an event for the World Wide Wrestling Federation in Toronto, Ontario on April 25, he also began touring Japan with International Wrestling Enterprise later that year as he and Gypsy Joe lost to the Great Kusatsu & Mighty Inoue in a 2-of-3 match for the IWA World Tag Team Championship at the Yamato Shatai-kogyo Gym in Kanagawa, Japan on December 4, 1976. Although Gypsy Joe scored the first fall over the Mighty Inoue, he and Gypsy Joe forfeited the second fall via disqualification with Hayes being pinned by Inoue to take the third fall. While in Japan, he became close friends with fellow Canadian wrestler Archie Gouldie.

=== Later career and retirement ===
Returning to Stampede Wrestling in late 1976, he began feuding with his former tag team partner Mr. Hito facing him on December 26. Facing him several times during the next month, he also faced him in a no countout/disqualification match on January 2. Fighting him to a no contest at the Victoria Pavilion in Calgary several days later, he also participated in battle royal later that night which included Leo Burke, John Foley, Gama Singh, Gypsy Joe, Mr. Hito, Ed & Jerry Morrow, the Cuban Assassins (Cuban Assassin & Bad News Allen) and Bruce & Keith Hart. The winner was to receive a 1977 Pontiac Trans Am.

During the next few weeks, Hayes faced Killer Tim Brooks, Higo Hamaguchi, Gypsy Joe, Don Gagne and, teaming with Frenchy LaMonte, defeated Don Gagne & Wee Willie Wilson on March 11. Later that month, he also defeated Mr. Hito and The Royal Kangaroos (Jonathan Boyd & Norman Frederick Charles III) in a 6-man tag team match with Keith Hart and Alo Leilani on March 27. Failing to win the Stampede International Tag Team titles from The Fabulous Kangaroos with Keith Hart and Larry Lane in April, he also faced Mr. Hito and U.F.O. in single and tag team matches later that month. In October, he also faced Oki Shikuna and Kasavubu.

Back in Calgary by the end of the year, Hayes defeated Louis Laurence on December 29, 1978. Two days later, he participated in a 20-man battle royal involving Big Daddy Ritter, Mr. Hito, Dynamite Kid, Mr. Sakurada, Norman Frederick Charles III, Louis Laurence, John Foley, Sandy Scott and the Hart brothers Keith, Bruce and Bret Hart. Defeating Norman Frederick Charles III on January 6, he faced Stampede North American Heavyweight Champion Big Daddy Ritter in several close matches and defeating Ritter by disqualification on January 26. Teaming with Jim "the Anvil" Neidhart, he also defeated Ritter and Hercules Ayala in a tag team match on February 9.

Facing Ritter in a 6-man tag team match with Keith Hart and Jake "The Snake" Roberts against Ritter, Mr. Hito & Mr. Sakurada on March 3, he was unable to defeat Ritter for the championship eventually losing to Ritter in a no disqualification match on March 9. He and Jim Neidhart lost to Mr. Hito & Mr. Sakurada on March 16 and, facing The Cuban Assassin over the next several weeks, he eventually faced him in his last match in the promotion losing to The Cuban Assassin in Calgary on March 23, 1979.

Less active during the next several years, he finally retired from active competition in 1981 after blowing out both of his knees while touring Hawaii. He made occasional appearances until late 1985, fighting Dan Kroffat to a no contest on December 25 and, two days later, losing to Bruce Hart by disqualification on December 29, 1985.

== Recent years ==
Hayes later worked as a city official for Edmonton involved in the streets department following his retirement as well as becoming an amateur woodworker producing wooden toys such as trains and puzzles later sold on consignment. Hayes has two children: a daughter, Toni Wynne, born in 1964; and a son, James Craig (Jim), born in 1968. After Bruce and Ross Hart reopened Stampede Wrestling in 1999, Hayes appeared in the promotion as a referee, although his involvement was limited following the Hart brothers limiting their involvement in Stampede Wrestling in 2005.

In April 2007, he and several other Stampede Wrestling alumni—including John Cozman, Bob Leonard, Bret and Ross Hart—were honored at a special banquet held in Las Vegas, Nevada by the Cauliflower Alley Club, hosted by Scott D'Amore and Greg Oliver. Other Canadian honorees included Maurice and Paul Vachon, Killer Kowalski, Don Leo Jonathan, Angelo Mosca, Pepper Martin, Michelle Starr, Jack Laskin, Billy Two Rivers, "Beautiful" Bruce Swayze, Pat Patterson, and Nick and Jerry Kozak. Hayes died from a heart attack on July 28, 2022, while visiting his family in Fort Frances, Ontario. Gil Hayes was posthumously honored at the 50th anniversary show of the World Wrestling Council.

== Championships and accomplishments ==
- Stampede Wrestling

- NWA International Tag Team Championship (Calgary version) (6 times) – with Bill Dromo (1), Bob Sweetan (1), Tiger Joe Tomasso (1), Benny Ramirez (1) and Mr. Hito (2)
- Stampede North American Heavyweight Championship (2 times)
- Stampede Wrestling Hall of Fame

- World Wrestling Council

- WWC Caribbean Heavyweight Championship (1 time)
- WWC North American Heavyweight Championship (1 time)
