= Danny Babich =

Bosnian professional wrestler

Personal information
- Born: Nedelko Babic; April 12, 1937 Bosnia and Herzegovina, Kingdom of Yugoslavia
- Died: June 28, 2008 (aged 71)

Professional wrestling career
- Ring name(s): Danny Babich; Igor Volkoff; Daniel Martel; Yugo Babich
- Trained by: Stu Hart
- Debut: 1970
- Retired: 1989

Nedelko Babic (12 April 1937 – 28 June 2008) was a Yugoslavian-Bosnian professional wrestler, known by his ring names Danny Babich and Igor Volkoff who competed in Canada, Japan, Puerto Rico and the United States during the 1970s and 1980s. He spent most of his career in Vancouver's NWA All-Star Wrestling and Portland's Pacific Northwest Wrestling.

== Professional wrestling career ==
Trained by Stu Hart, Babich made his wrestling debut in 1970 in Calgary for Stampede Wrestling. teaming with Danny Babich to defeat Earl Black and Tiger Joe Tomasso for the Stampede International Tag team Championship in Calgary, Alberta on October 1, 1971. Their championship reign was brief, however, as they lost the titles to Chin Lee and Sugi Sito less than two weeks later.

He and Babich would later defeat Tiger Joe Tomasso and Gil Hayes to recapture the tag team titles in mid-December only to lose the titles to George Gordienko and Super Hawk on December 16. Rebounding a week later, they won the titles back from George Gordienko and Super Hawk on December 23 and held on to the titles for almost a month before losing to Dan Kroffat and Lennie Hurst in Edmonton, Alberta on January 20, 1972. Winning back the titles in Calgary on February 9, he and Babich would eventually lose the titles to Carlos Belafonte and Gino Caruso two months later.

In 1971, he made his debut for Vancouver's NWA All-Star Wrestling and, in 1973, changed his character to a Russian heel as "Igor Volkoff". Then in 1972, he worked for Montreal's Grand Prix Wrestling, where he wrestled Andre the Giant. Stayed with Grand Prix until 1973.

Made his debut in the United States for the American Wrestling Association in Minneapolis in 1974 as "Yugo Babich". In 1975, he made his for Portland's Pacific Northwest Wrestling as "Igor Volkoff".

He reunited with his former Stampede Wrestling tag team partner Michel Martel and Pierre Martel, who became the third member of "The Mercenaries" as "Daniel Martel". Later defeating The Medics (Medico I and Medico II) for the WWC North American Tag Team titles in May 1977, he would feud over the tag team championship with Jose Rivera and Hercules Ayala and eventually won the tag team titles twice more with Martel before the end of the year. They broke up at the end of 1977, just before Martel died of a heart attack in Puerto Rico months later.

In 1978, Babich went to Japan to wrestle for International Wrestling Enterprise. That same year, he left Stampede and continued to work in Vancouver and Portland.

He won his only singles title NWA Canadian Heavyweight Championship (Vancouver version) in 1983 when he defeated Moose Morowski. He dropped the title to Al Tomko. Then he returned to Stampede in 1983 as Igor Volkoff. In 1984, he retired from wrestling.

In 1989, he returned to wrestling for a few more matches for British Columbia's Pacific Coast Championship Wrestling.

== Death ==
Babich passed away on June 28, 2008 at 71.

== Championships and accomplishments ==
- NWA All-Star Wrestling
  - NWA Canadian Heavyweight Championship (Vancouver version) (1 time)
  - NWA Canadian Tag Team Championship (Vancouver version) (4 times) - with Gama Singh (1), Bob Della Serra (1), The Mongol (1) and Al Tomko (1)
  - NWA International Tag Team Championship (Calgary version) (4 times) - with Michel Martel
- World Wrestling Council
  - WWC North American Tag Team Championship (3 times) - with Michel Martel
