= Michel Martel =

Canadian professional wrestler (1944–1978)

Personal information
- Born: Michel Vigneault; October 4, 1944 Quebec City, Quebec, Canada
- Died: June 30, 1978 (aged 33) Ponce, Puerto Rico
- Cause of death: Heart attack

Professional wrestling career
- Ring name(s): The Lumberjack; Mad Dog Martel; Michel Martel; Mitchell Martel
- Billed height: 6 ft 0 in (183 cm)
- Billed weight: 242 lb (110 kg)
- Billed from: Paris, France
- Trained by: Vic Tanney
- Debut: 1968

Michel Vigneault (October 4, 1944 – June 30, 1978) was a Canadian professional wrestler, better known by his ring name, Michel "Mad Dog" Martel. Martel is best known for his appearances with professional wrestling promotion such as Atlantic Grand Prix Wrestling, Stampede Wrestling, International Wrestling Enterprise and the World Wrestling Council in the late 1960s and 1970s. He was one-half of the tag team The Mercenaries with Frenchy Martin and the older brother of fellow wrestler Rick Martel.

== Professional wrestling career ==
=== Early career ===
The eldest of six children, Vigneault was born in Quebec City to Fernand Vigneault and Evelyne Harvey in October 1944. During high school, Vigneault became involved in powerlifting and began working nights as a bouncer and bartender in local clubs. It was during this time that he would meet his future tag team partner Pierre Martin.

During the late 1960s, he began training with his uncles Real Choinard and Aldrick Harvey who wrestled occasionally for promoter Johnny Rougeau. In 1968, he began touring northern Ontario during the summer for Larry Kasaboski. During his time in the area, he was trained by Vic Tanney and later wrestled for Johnny Rougeau in Quebec for a time before traveling to Stu Hart's Stampede Wrestling.

=== Stampede Wrestling ===
During his time in Stampede Wrestling, he would gain early success as a singles competitor becoming involved in a high-profile feud "Cowboy" Dan Kroffat before teaming with Danny Babich to defeat Earl Black and Tiger Joe Tomasso for the Stampede International Tag team Championship in Calgary, Alberta on October 1, 1971. Their championship reign was brief, however, as they lost the titles to Chin Lee and Sugi Sito less than two weeks later.

He and Babich would later defeat Tiger Joe Tomasso and Gil Hayes to recapture the tag team titles in mid-December only to lose the titles to George Gordienko and Super Hawk on December 16. Rebounding a week later, they won the titles back from George Gordienko and Super Hawk on December 23 and held on to the titles for almost a month before losing to Dan Kroffat and Lennie Hurst in Edmonton, Alberta on January 20, 1972. Winning back the titles in Calgary on February 9, he and Babich would eventually lose the titles to Carlos Belafonte and Gino Caruso two months later. While in Calgary, Martel would also occasionally return to Quebec from time to time as well as travel to Mexico where he wrestled as "The Lumberjack".

Soon after his brother's debut in June 1972, he and Rick Martel would team together in Quebec as well as occasionally in Georgia and Calgary during the next several years.

=== The Mercenaries in Japan and Puerto Rico ===
By the mid-1970s, Martel had become an established star in Stampede Wrestling and persuaded Pierre Martin to enter professional wrestling as well. Martin eventually agreed and, after training with several veterans in Quebec, Martel brought him into Stampede Wrestling during his first year as "Don Gagne". They soon began teaming together as "the Mercenaries", their in-ring personas closely mirroring the Québécois nationalist movements active in Quebec during that time, and began wrestling in Montreal and the Maritimes for Eastern Sports Association as Michel and Frenchy Martin feuding with Leo Burke, The Beast, Rudy Kay and Eric Pomeroy.

It was in Puerto Rico, however, where The Mercenaries gained the greatest success, when his friends Carlos Colon and Victor Rivera established the World Wrestling Council the previous year. Signing with the promotion in early 1975, he and Martin would defeat Vikingo and Ciclon Sudamericano for the WWC North American Tag Team Championship in Caguas, Puerto Rico on April 8, 1975. Feuding with Jose Rivera and Carlos Colon during the next several months, he and Martin remained the top "heels" in the promotion headlining the majority of the WWC events with Rivera and Colon for much of the year. In one of the biggest cards of the year, which featured the return of WWC mainstays Eric the Red, “Cowboy” Bob Ellis and Dick Steinborn, the Martel brothers lost a hair vs. hair match to Jose Rivera and Carlos Colon on May 31, 1975. They would also be allied with Kurt Von Hess for a short time while he toured Puerto Rico during the summer.

After losing the titles to Jose Rivera & Ciclon in August 1975, the Mercenaries also had a brief stay in the Cleveland-based International Wrestling Association facing Johnny Powers and Pez Whatley in Walpole, Massachusetts on October 1. Negotiations to sign with the IWA would later fall through due to miscommunication with promoters Pedro Martínez and Eddie Einhorn, however, including being unable to attain a work visa among other issues.

In November and December 1975, the Mercenaries (billed as "Combat") wrestled in Japan for the International Wrestling Enterprise promotion as part of its Big Winter Series. In their second bout, they defeated Great Kusatsu and Mighty Inoue in a two-out-of-three falls match to win the IWA World Tag Team Championship. Kusatsu and Inoue regained the titles from Combat the following month in a cage match. Combat made a second tour with International Wrestling Enterprise in October to December 1976 as part of its Bravery Series.

During the next two years, "The Mercenaries" would become one of the most popular tag teams in the promotion and feuded with many of the biggest stars of the era including Carlos Colon, Jose and Johnny Rivera and The Moondogs. He and Martin would eventually be joined Danny Babich, Martel's former Stampede Wrestling tag team partner, who became the third member of "The Mercenaries" as "Daniel Martel". Later defeating The Medics (Medico I and Medico II) for the WWC North American Tag Team titles in May 1977, he would feud over the tag team championship with Jose Rivera and Hercules Ayala and eventually won the tag team titles twice more with Babich before the end of the year. Returning to Stampede Wrestling in early 1978, he would also briefly feud with Leo Burke over the Stampede North American Championship defeating Burke for the title in March before losing it back to him the following month.

== Death ==
On the night of June 30, 1978, Martel was wrestling at a WWC event in Ponce, Puerto Rico appearing on the undercard in a 6-man tag team match alongside Pierre Martin and Jack Lafarb facing Carlos Colon and "The Invaders" (Invader I and Invader II). Although showing no signs during the match, he complained of suffering hot flashes during the match to his tag team partner while backstage preparing to leave for the night. Martel left the arena along with Pierre. While on his way to San Juan, Michel suffered a heart attack, and was rushed to a hospital in Ponce, where he was pronounced dead.

Rick Martel, then 22 years old, would eventually be flown into Puerto Rico to identify his brother and eventually charged with bringing his body back to Quebec. His death was not only announced by Bob Leonard in Stampede Wrestling but also the World Wrestling Council where promoter Carlos Colon and Jose Gonzalez would use Martel's death to promote a long running feud between The Invaders and Pierre Martin and Rick Martel with the promotion claiming that Martel's attack had been caused by Gonzales using the then banned "heart punch" during their last match. This incident was later brought up when Jose Gonzalez stabbed American wrestler Bruiser Brody to death at a WWC show in 1988. This has since been revealed as "kayfabe" used to promote Gonzalez's feud with Frenchy Martin and Michel Martel's younger brother Rick Martel.

== Championships and accomplishments ==
- Cauliflower Alley Club
  - Posthumous Award (2011)
- Eastern Sports Association
  - ESA Maritime Tag Team Championship (1 time) - with Frenchy Martin
- International Wrestling Enterprise
  - IWA World Tag Team Championship (1 time) - with Pierre Martin
- Stampede Wrestling
  - NWA International Tag Team Championship (Calgary version) (4 times) - with Danny Babich
  - Stampede Wrestling North American Heavyweight Championship (1 time)
- World Wrestling Council
  - WWC North American Tag Team Championship (4 times) - with Pierre Martel (1) and Daniel Martel (3)

== See also ==
- List of premature professional wrestling deaths
