= 1943 in professional wrestling =

1943 in professional wrestling describes the year's events in the world of professional wrestling.

== List of notable promotions ==
Only one promotion held notable shows in 1943.

Promotion Name	Abbreviation
Empresa Mexicana de Lucha Libre	EMLL

== Calendar of notable shows ==
Date	Promotion(s)	Event	Location	Main Event
April 2	EMLL	Arena Coliseum opening show	Mexico City, Mexico	Tarzán López (c) defeated El Santo in a best two-out-of-three falls match for the Mexican National Middleweight Championship
September 24	EMLL	EMLL 10th Anniversary Show	Mexico City, Mexico	El Santo defeated Bobby Bonales in a best two-out-of-three falls Lucha de Apuesta, mask vs. hair match.
(c) – denotes defending champion(s)

== Notable events ==
- April 2 – Arena Coliseo, in Mexico City, opens and holds its first professional wrestling event. The arena was owned by Salvador Lutteroth, the founder of Empresa Mexicana de Lucha Libre (EMLL) and would serve as their main venue for the following 10 years.

== Championship changes ==
=== EMLL ===
Mexican National Heavyweight Championship
Incoming champion – Rye Duran
Date	Winner	Event/Show	Note(s)
No title changes

Mexican National Light Heavyweight Championship
Incoming champion - Jesus Anaya
Date	Winner	Event/Show	Note(s)
March	Black Guzman	Live event	

Mexican National Lightweight Championship
Incoming champion –Adolfo Bonales
Date	Winner	Event/Show	Note(s)
May 30	Joe Silva	EMLL show	

Mexican National Middleweight Championship
Incoming champion – Murciélago Velázquez
Date	Winner	Event/Show	Note(s)
March 19	El Santo	EMLL show	
June 11	Bobby Bonales	EMLL show	
October 8	El Santo	EMLL show	

Mexican National Welterweight Championship
Incoming champion – Ciclón Veloz
Date	Winner	Event/Show	Note(s)
February 21	El Santo	EMLL show	

NWA World Middleweight Championship
Incoming champion – Tarzán López
No title changes

== Debuts ==
- Debut date uncertain
  - Sonny Myers
  - Sugi Sito
  - Sailor Art Thomas

== Births ==
- Date of birth unknown:
  - Evelyn Stevens
- January 15 – Alberto Muñoz(died in 2019)
- January 20 – Bob Lueck
- February 15 – Mitsu Hirai(died in 2003)
- February 20 – Antonio Inoki(died in 2022)
- March 16 – Verlon Biggs (died in 1994)
- March 23 – Johnny Powers (died in 2022)
- April 4 – Pete Sanchez (died in 2024)
- April 8 – Robbie Ellis (died in 2025)
- April 11:
  - Harley Race(died in 2019)
  - Pak Song (died in 1982)
- April 13 – Alfonso Dantés(died in 2008)
- April 16 – Frankie Laine(died in 2016)
- April 24 – Mike Boyette (died in 2012)
- May 15 – Pepe Casas
- May 18 – Jimmy Snuka(died in 2017)
- June 7 – Billy Graham (died in 2023)
- June 12 – Fred Curry (died in 2026)
- July 13 – Otto Wanz(died in 2017)
- July 17 – Jean Antone (died in 2016)
- July 29:
  - Earl Black
  - Bette Boucher
- October 9:
  - Betty Niccoli
  - Kantaro Hoshino (died in 2010)
- October 22 – Bad News Brown(died in 2007)
- October 24 – Bill Dundee(died in 2026)
- November 3 - Robert Bruce (wrestler) (died in 2009)
- December 4 – Katsuhisa Shibata(died in 2010)
- December 25 – Harold Poole (died in 2014)
- December 31 – Adorable Rubí(died in 2012)
