= Benny Ramírez =

Colombian professional wrestler

Personal information
- Born: Benjamín Ramírez; January 2, 1932 Colombia
- Died: December 20, 1995 (aged 63) Near Buga, Colombia

Professional wrestling career
- Ring name(s): Benji Ramirez; Bennie Ramírez; Benny Ramírez; The Killer; The Mummy
- Billed height: 186 cm (6 ft 1 in)
- Billed weight: 115 kg (254 lb)
- Debut: 1959
- Retired: 1983

Benjamín Ramírez (January 2, 1932 – December 20, 1995) was a Colombian professional wrestler who competed in North American and Japanese promotions from the 1960s to early 1980s. He wrestled under his ring names The Mummy, Benji Ramírez, Bennie Ramírez, Benny Ramírez, and The Killer.

== Professional wrestling career ==
After making his debut in Colombia in 1959, Ramírez moved to the United States and worked in the Texas territory of the National Wrestling Alliance. In 1961, he was a masked wrestler under the ring name "The Mummy", a gimmick of a mummy who was revived in modern times. That gimmick was the brainchild of Maurice P. Siegel, a Houston-based promoter. Wearing a white mask with long hair and wearing a strange costume that covered his whole body with dirty bandages, Ramírez suddenly became a sensational heel. On May 18, 1962, he defeated Dory Dixon to win the NWA Texas Heavyweight Championship. Ramírez challenged Lou Thesz for the NWA World Heavyweight Championship on April 3, 1963 in San Antonio and lost that match.

In April 1964, Ramírez came to the Japanese promotion Japan Pro Wrestling Alliance and participated in the 6th World League tournament with Gene Kiniski, Calypso Hurricane, Bull Curry, and Billy White Wolf. In the first round, he defeated Umanosuke Ueda, but in the league match, he lost to wrestlers such as Toyonobori and Giant Baba. Although Ramírez's battle record was poor, he created a sensation by putting powder in the gaps between his bandages and causing white dust to fly up from his body when he was attacked by an opponent. There was also a story that he was wiping his skin and covered his skin with a bandage to hide it.

In July 1965, Ramírez was stabbed by a spectator following a match against Pedro Morales in Pasadena, California. Ramírez had been disqualified for roughness when 79-year-old John W. Jones attacked him, inflicting a three-inch wound to his chest. Ramírez was subsequently reported to be in good condition, while Jones was charged with assault with a deadly weapon.

Ramírez returned to the Texas promotions, and in the late 1960s, he wrestled in various places such as Florida, North Carolina, and South Carolina, and California. He was active in the Carolinas in 1967 teaming with Apache Bull Ramos. On May 16, 1968 in Amarillo, Texas, Ramírez unsuccessfully challenged Dory Funk Sr. for the NWA North American Heavyweight Championship, and on January 15, 1969 in Sacramento, California, he teamed with Masa Saito.

In the 1970s, Ramírez took off his mask and turned face, calling himself "Benji Ramírez" or "Benny Ramírez" and started working in Heart of America Sports Attractions. In September 1972, he came to Japan for International Wrestling Enterprise (IWE) as Benji Ramírez, and on October 16 in Yamato, he wrestled Strong Kobayashi in a barbed wired match. After that, Ramírez jumped ship to Stampede Wrestling and on July 20, 1973, he teamed up with Gil Hayes to win the International Tag Team Championship. They lost the titles to The Samoans (Afa & Sika) on August 31.

In June 1974, Ramírez put on a mask again and transformed into a new masked wrestler called "The Killer" and returned to Japan for IWE. Under the rumor that he had a bloody battle with Mad Dog Vachon in Montreal, he lost to Great Kusatsu in a Texas chain death match on July 1 at Fukuoka Kyuden Kinen Gymnasium in Fukuoka. On September 8, 1975, The Killer teamed up with Gypsy Joe to challenge Kusatsu and Animal Hamaguchi for the IWA World Tag Team Championship in a losing effort.

After leaving IWE, Ramírez worked as a jobber in Central States Wrestling. After his semi-retirement, he occasionally appeared in undercard matches for the promotion until about 1982.

== Death ==
On December 20, 1995, Ramírez and his wife died in the crash of American Airlines Flight 965. On that day, he was supposed to return to his home country of Colombia to visit relatives with his wife and youngest daughter, from North Kansas City, Missouri, where he resided. He and his wife were survived by their two daughters.

== Championships and accomplishments ==
- NWA Texas
  - NWA Texas Heavyweight Championship (1 time)
- Stampede Wrestling
  - NWA International Tag Team Championship (Calgary version) (1 time) – with Gil Hayes (1)
