= Kerry Brown (wrestler) =

Canadian professional wrestler (1958 – 2009)

Personal information
- Born: February 3, 1958 Winnipeg, Manitoba, Canada
- Died: September 10, 2009 (aged 51) Winnipeg, Manitoba, Canada
- Cause of death: Liver failure
- Family: Bob Brown (uncle); Doug Brown (uncle)

Professional wrestling career
- Ring name(s): Kerry Brown; Kerry Lee Brown; Rick Valentine
- Billed height: 6 ft 0 in (1.83 m)
- Billed weight: 266 lb (121 kg)
- Trained by: Bob Brown
- Debut: 1979
- Retired: January 2009

Kerry Brown (February 3, 1958 – September 10, 2009) was a Canadian professional wrestler. Brown was best known for working in Stampede Wrestling in the 1980s under his real name, but also wrestled in Puerto Rico, Montreal and the Maritimes using the ring name Rick Valentine.

== Career ==
=== Beginning and Canadian promotions ===
Brown began wrestling in 1979 in promotions located in Winnipeg. The following year, in 1980, began working in Kansas City, in the same promotion that his uncle "Bulldog" Bob Brown worked for. He then began working for Stampede Wrestling, a promotion based in Calgary. He quickly became known as a tag team wrestler in Stampede, teaming up with Duke Myers to win the Stampede Wrestling International Tag Team Championship for the first time on September 25, 1981. They won the championship for the second time on March 23, 1983, by defeating Leo Burke and David Schultz in a tournament final for the vacant championship. Four months later, in July 1982, Brown won the Atlantic Grand Prix Wrestling (AGPW) United States Heavyweight Championship, his first singles championship in professional wrestling. Later that year, on December 8, he and Myers defeated Bret Hart and Leo Burke to win the Stampede Wrestling International Tag Team Championship for the third time.

It was during this time that Brown gained infamy when he refused to lose to Owen Hart while working with Stampede Wrestling. According to Mike Shaw, Brown was supposed to start a scripted rivalry with Hart, but refused to lose a match to Hart, so the card was switched, and Shaw replaced Brown in the rivalry. Brown went on to wrestle in Montreal-based Lutte Internationale under the name Rick Valentine. He teamed with Sailor White, and the pair were managed by Tarzan Tyler.

On May 18, 1983, Brown won the AGPW United States Heavyweight Championship for the second time. Later that year, Brown won the AGPW North American Tag Team Championship when he teamed with Frenchy Martin to defeat Vic Rossitani and Bull Johnston in September. On December 21, 1985, Brown won the Stampede North American Heavyweight Championship by defeating Davey Boy Smith. The following year, on June 6, Brown and his long-term tag team partner Myers won the Stampede Wrestling International Tag Team Championship again by defeating Keith Hart and Chris Benoit. Over a year later, he won the AGPW North American Tag Team Championship for the second time when he and his uncle Bob defeated Kid Dynamite and Dino Ventura. Two years later, on June 9, 1989, Brown won the Stampede Wrestling International Tag Team Championship with his uncle, when they defeated Benoit and Biff Wellington.

=== Puerto Rico and later career ===
In the World Wrestling Council (WWC), Brown wrestled using the name Rick Valentine, and was used predominantly in the mid-card and tag team ranks. He won the WWC World Tag Team Championship with Lance Idol on August 4, 1990 when they defeated Super Medic I and Super Medic III, and the two also held the WWC Caribbean Tag Team Championship later that year. He also won the WWC Caribbean Tag Team Championship twice with Eric Embry in 1990, once by defeating Miguelito Perez and Huracán Castillo, Jr. on September 23 and the second time by defeating Super Medic I and Super Medic III on December 15. He won the championship on one occasion with Gran Mendoza in 1991, when they defeated Super Medic I and Super Medic III on January 23.

After Puerto Rico, Brown returned to Canada working only in Manitoba, Saskatchewan, and Alberta.

In 2003 and 2004, Brown wrestled for the Canadian Wrestling Federation (CWF) and Premier Championship Wrestling, where he teamed with Jason Gagne as The Dog Pound. Brown's last match was in January 2009 losing to Danny Duggan in Winnipeg.

== Personal life ==
Brown was the nephew of wrestler "Bulldog" Bob Brown, but was occasionally billed as his son.

Brown was found unresponsive in his home in Winnipeg, Manitoba, Canada on September 10, 2009. The cause of death was apparent liver failure.

== Championships and accomplishments ==
- Atlantic Grand Prix Wrestling
  - AGPW United States Heavyweight Championship (2 times)
  - AGPW North American Tag Team Championship (1 time) - with Bob Brown
- Canadian Wrestling Federation
  - CWF Heavyweight Championship (3 times)
  - CWF Tag Team Championship (1 time) - with Adrian Walls
- Lutte Internationale
  - Canadian International Tag Team Championship (1 time) - with Sailor White
- National Wrestling Alliance
  - NWA Canadian Heavyweight Championship (1 time)
- Stampede Wrestling
  - Stampede North American Heavyweight Championship (1 time)
  - Stampede Wrestling International Tag Team Championship (4 times) - with Duke Myers (3) and Bob Brown (1)
  - Stampede Wrestling Hall of Fame (Class of 1995)
- World Wrestling Council
  - WWC Caribbean Tag Team Championship (3 times) - with Eric Embry (2), and Galan Mendoza (1)
  - WWC World Tag Team Championship (1 time) - with Lance Idol
