= Beef Wellington (disambiguation) =

Beef Wellington is a steak dish, named after Arthur Wellesley, 1st Duke of Wellington

Beef Wellington may also refer to:

- Biff Wellington, stage name of wrestler Shayne Alexander Bower
- Beef Wellington (wrestler), a nickname for wrestler Brad Maddox
