= Earl Black =

Earl Black may refer to:

- Earl Black (political scientist) (born 1942), American political scientist
- Earl Black (wrestler) (born 1943), Australian professional wrestler
