= NWA Canadian Heavyweight Championship (Calgary version) =

Professional wrestling championship

NWA Canadian Heavyweight Championship (Calgary)
- Original version of the championship belt

Details
- Promotion: Stampede Wrestling
- Date established: November 1, 1946
- Date retired: 1972
Statistics
- First champion(s): Al Mills
- Most reigns: Dave Ruhl (8 reigns)
- Longest reign: Al Mills (1,578 days)
- Shortest reign: Sammy Burg (1 day)
- Heaviest champion: Abdullah the Butcher (430 lb (200 kg; 31 st))

The Calgary version of the NWA Canadian Heavyweight Championship was established in 1946, and became the top championship in Stampede Wrestling when that promotion opened in 1948; it held that status until 1972, when the title was vacated and later abandoned after the last champion, Dave Ruhl, was injured.

== Title history ==
Key
No.	Overall reign number
Reign	Reign number for the specific champion
Days	Number of days held

No.	Champion	Championship change			Reign statistics		Notes	Ref.
No.	Champion	Date	Event	Location	Reign	Days	Notes	Ref.
1	Jack Taylor	1	Stampede show	N/A	1	(Note: The length of this championship reign is too uncertain to calculate.)	Records are unclear on how Jack Taylor became champion	
—		N/A	—	—				
2	Earl McCready	April 20, 1933	Stampede show	Calgary, Alberta	1		Also won the British Empire Title; still champion on October 19, 1934 and February 7, 1935.	
—		N/A	—	—				
3	Jack Forsgren	November 28, 1936	Stampede show	N/A	1	(Note: The date the championship was either won or lost is uncertain, which means this specific reign lasted between 1 and 804 days.)		
—		N/A	—	—				
4	Pat Meehan	February 10, 1939	Stampede show	Calgary, Alberta	1	(Note: The date the championship was either won or lost is uncertain, which means this specific reign lasted between 1 and 2,821 days.)	Lost to Earl McCready on January 11, 1940 in Vancouver, may have been a non-title match	
—		N/A	—	—				
5	Al Mills	November 1, 1946	Stampede show	Calgary, Alberta	1	(Note: The date the championship was either won or lost is uncertain, which means this specific reign lasted between 1 and 1,578 days.)	Defeated Chief Thunderbird; also defeated Billy Watson on February 28, 1950 in Edmonton, Alberta to be recognized as Dominion Heavyweight champion by Stampede Wrestling.	
—		N/A	—	—				
6	Ski Hi Lee	February 26, 1951	Stampede show	Edmonton, Alberta	1	8	Also billed as Western Canadian Title.	
7	Al Mills	March 6, 1951	Stampede show	Edmonton, Alberta	2	56	Also billed as Western Canadian Championship.	
8	Jack McDonald	May 1, 1951	Stampede show	Edmonton, Alberta	1	7		
9	Al Mills	May 8, 1951	Stampede show	Edmonton, Alberta	3	266		
10	Ski Hi Lee	January 29, 1952	Stampede show	Edmonton, Alberta	2	7		
11	Al Mills	February 5, 1952	Stampede show	Edmonton, Alberta	4	98	Recognized as champion in the '52 Official NWA Newsletter.	
12	Bob Langevin	May 13, 1952	Stampede show	Edmonton, Alberta	1	28	Won by forfeit when Mills no-showed a title match.	
13	Mr. X	June 10, 1952	Stampede show	Edmonton, Alberta	1	477		
14	Al Mills	September 30, 1953	Stampede show	Edmonton, Alberta	5		Still/again champion as of October 21, 1953.	
—		N/A	—	—				
15	Lou Newman	October 18, 1954	Stampede show	Edmonton, Alberta	1		Tournament for the vacant title.	
—		N/A	—	—				
16	George Gordienko	June 4, 1955	Stampede show	Calgary, Alberta	1	9	Defeated Adrien Baillargeon in tournament final for what was billed as "Alberta Gold Belt".	
—		N/A	—	—				
17	George Gordienko	June 13, 1955	Stampede show	Lethbridge, Alberta	2	(Note: The date the championship was either won or lost is uncertain, which means this specific reign lasted between 1 and 127 days.)	Defeated Earl McCready	
—		N/A	—	—				
18	Lou Newman	October 18, 1955	Stampede show	Edmonton, Alberta	1	176	Defeated Al Mills	
19	George Gordienko	April 11, 1956	Stampede show	Regina, Saskatchewan	3	(Note: The date the championship was either won or lost is uncertain, which means this specific reign lasted between 1 and 250 days.)	Still champion as of March 10, 1956	
—		N/A	—	—				
20	Johnny Valentine	December 17, 1956	Stampede show	N/A	1	51		
21	Sammy Berg	February 6, 1957	Stampede show	Saskatoon, Saskatchewan	1	0	Title is stripped from Valentine and awarded to Berg as a result of a disputed decision on a January 30, 1957 match.	
22	Johnny Valentine	February 6, 1957	Stampede show	Saskatoon, Saskatchewan	2	37		
23	John Paul Henning	March 15, 1957	Stampede show	Calgary, Alberta	1			
—		N/A	—	—				
—	Vacated	1957 (NLT)	—	—	—	—	Championship vacated for undocumented reasons	
24	Whipper Billy Watson	1958	Stampede show	N/A	1		Won a tournament	
—		N/A	—	—				
25	Johnny Valentine	January 1959	Stampede show	N/A	3		Unknown who he defeated for the title.	
25.5	vacated	1959	N/A	N/A			Championship vacated for undocumented reasons	
26	John Foti	June 5, 1959	Stampede show	Calgary, Alberta	1	(Note: The date the championship was either won or lost is uncertain, which means this specific reign lasted between 39 and 161 days.)	Defeated Charro Azteca in 8-man tournament final.	
—		N/A	—	—				
—	Vacated	July 14, 1959 (NET)	—	—	—	—	Championship vacated for undocumented reasons	
27	Dave Ruhl	November 13, 1959	Stampede show	Calgary, Alberta	1	336	Defeated Al Mills	
28	Cyclops	October 14, 1960	Stampede show	Calgary, Alberta	1	(Note: The date the championship was either won or lost is uncertain, which means this specific reign lasted between −287 and −257 days.)		
—		N/A	—	—				
29	Ed Francis	January 1961	Stampede show	N/A	1	(Note: The date the championship was either won or lost is uncertain, which means this specific reign lasted between 390 and 420 days.)	Unknown whom Francis defeated for the title.	
30	John Smith	February 24, 1961	Stampede show	Calgary, Alberta	1	105		
31	John Foti	June 9, 1961	Stampede show	Calgary, Alberta	2	(Note: The date the championship was either won or lost is uncertain, which means this specific reign lasted between 1 and 161 days.)		
—		N/A	—	—				
32	Killer Kowalski	November 17, 1961	Stampede show	N/A	1	112	Recognized as N.A.W.A. Canadian champion; unknown whom Kowalski defeated for the title.	
33	Czaya Nandor	March 9, 1962	Stampede show	Calgary, Alberta	1	(Note: The date the championship was either won or lost is uncertain, which means this specific reign lasted between 1 and 13 days.)		
34	Alexis Bruga	March 1962	Stampede show	N/A	1	(Note: The date the championship was either won or lost is uncertain, which means this specific reign lasted between 1 and 13 days.)		
35	Czaya Nandor	March 23, 1962	Stampede show	Calgary, Alberta	2	(Note: The date the championship was either won or lost is uncertain, which means this specific reign lasted between 39 and 50 days.)		
36	Killer Kowalski	May 1962	Stampede show	N/A	2	(Note: The date the championship was either won or lost is uncertain, which means this specific reign lasted between 1 and 12 days.)		
37	Czaya Nandor	May 12, 1962	Stampede show	Calgary, Alberta	3	55		
38	Killer Kowalski	July 6, 1962	Stampede show	Calgary, Alberta	3	(Note: The date the championship was either won or lost is uncertain, which means this specific reign lasted between 1 and 612 days.)		
—		N/A	—	—				
39	Waldo Von Erich	March 9, 1964	Stampede show	N/A	1		Unknown whom Von Erich defeated for the title and still/again champion as of July 6, 1964.	
—		N/A	—	—				
40	Don Leo Jonathan	1964	Stampede show	N/A	1		Unknown whom Jonathan defeated for the title.	
41	Stan Stasiak	1965	Stampede show	N/A	1			
42	Don Leo Jonathan	1965	Stampede show	N/A	2			
43	Sweet Daddy Siki	1965	Stampede show	N/A	1			
44	Dave Ruhl	1966	Stampede show	N/A	2			
45	The Beast	1966	Stampede show	N/A	1			
46	Dave Ruhl	December 6, 1966	Stampede show	N/A	3	(Note: The date the championship was either won or lost is uncertain, which means this specific reign lasted between 85 and 115 days.)		
47	Stan Stasiak	March 1967	Stampede show	N/A	2			
48	Luther Lindsay	1967	Stampede show	N/A	1			
49	Stan Stasiak	June 5, 1967	Stampede show	N/A	3	22		
50	Dave Ruhl	June 27, 1967	Stampede show	Calgary, Alberta	4	2		
51	Stan Stasiak	June 29, 1967	Stampede show	Saskatoon, Saskatchewan	4	5		
52	Dave Ruhl	July 4, 1967	Stampede show	Saskatoon, Saskatchewan	5	136		
53	Archie Gouldie	November 17, 1967	Stampede show	Calgary, Alberta	1	−254		
54	Ox Baker	March 8, 1967	Stampede show	Calgary, Alberta	1	7		
55	Waldo Von Erich	March 15, 1967	Stampede show	Calgary, Alberta	2	(Note: The date the championship was either won or lost is uncertain, which means this specific reign lasted between 1 and 262 days.)		
—		N/A	—	—				
56	Dave Ruhl	December 2, 1967	Stampede show	N/A	6	755		
57	Danny Lynch	December 26, 1969	Stampede show	Calgary, Alberta	1	14		
58	Dave Ruhl	January 9, 1970	Stampede show	Calgary, Alberta	7	21		
59	Abdullah the Butcher	January 30, 1970	Stampede show	Calgary, Alberta	1	21		
60	Billy Robinson	February 20, 1970	Stampede show	Calgary, Alberta	1			
61	Dave Ruhl	1971	Stampede show	N/A	8			
—	Vacated	1972	—	—	—	—	Rhul was injured and the championship was abandoned	
