= Ed Whalen (broadcaster) =

Canadian television personality and journalist

- Publicity photo from the Calgary Sun

Personal information
- Born: July 8, 1927 Saskatoon, Saskatchewan, Canada
- Died: December 4, 2001 (aged 74) Venice, Florida, U.S.
- Spouse: Nomi Whalen (m. 1967)
- Children: 5

Professional wrestling career
- Ring name: Ed Whalen
- Debut: 1958
- Retired: 1999

Ed Whalen (July 8, 1927 – December 4, 2001) was a Canadian television personality and journalist best known for hosting the popular professional wrestling TV series Stampede Wrestling. Whalen was also a popular sportcaster in Calgary, Alberta whose nickname "Wailin' Ed" was indicative of his famous nasal announcing voice.

== Biography ==
Born in Saskatoon, Saskatchewan, Ed Whalen was studying medicine at the University of Saskatchewan in 1948 when he dropped out to take a part-time job in radio broadcasting at CFQC radio. In 1955, he moved to Calgary and became the News and Sports Director for the new Calgary TV station CHCT (later popularly known as 2&7, and then Calgary 7, and later still as part of the Global Television Network).

=== Wrestling ===
Stu Hart was introduced to Ed Whalen while he promoted shows in Saskatchewan. In 1949, Ed was tapped to be the ring announcer on the shows there. Ed recalls one of his stints when he was just 21 and started in radio with his sign off of, "I'm 48 degrees and outside it's Ed Whalen." When Ed had the chance to apply for TV from radio in Saskatchewan, he jumped at the chance. The friendship with Stu was not forgotten as Stu, looking to air his program, contacted Ed Whalen. Whalen went to bat for Stu and the first program aired in 1957. Henry Viney was the first host of the show known as Wildcat Wrestling. In 1962, Ed took over as the host of the show and it was renamed to its run as Stampede Wrestling. It was bestowed the official Stampede name in 1975. Ed would be the host of the show from 1962 to 1983. It was there he would quit on air citing its violent and bloody matches and lack of family entertainment. Ed would rejoin Stampede Wrestling when it resumed in 1985 to 1989). The show popularized several Whalen catchphrases including "It's going to be a ring-a-ding-dong dandy!" and his trademark sign-off, "In the meantime and in-between time." According to Ross Hart, Whalen, along with Helen Hart, were the only classy elements to the wrestling business, stating that Whalen and she added dignity to Stampede Wrestling.

=== Hockey ===
After his time with Stampede Wrestling, Whalen became beloved by Calgarians as the television voice of the Calgary Flames on 2&7/Calgary 7 from 1980 (right after the city won the NHL franchise) until his retirement in 1999, and was famous for his introduction, "Hello hockey fans!"

Whalen also wrote a weekly column in the Calgary Sun newspaper for many years, and even after his retirement he continued to make occasional appearances on TV and still wrote his column. He also was a regular local host of the Children's Miracle Network telethon.

=== Death ===
Whalen died of a heart attack while on vacation in Venice, Florida in 2001. The broadcasting booth in Calgary's Scotiabank Saddledome (home of the Calgary Flames) was renamed the Ed Whalen Broadcast Booth in his honour. A year after his death, his wife released a CD of musical recordings Whalen made, with the proceeds going to charity.

== Championships and accomplishments ==
- Canadian Wrestling Hall of Fame
  - Class of 2016
- Stampede Wrestling
  - Stampede Wrestling Hall of Fame (Class of 1995)
- Wrestling Observer Newsletter
  - Worst Television Announcer (1989)
