= Paul Peller =

Canadian professional wrestler

Personal information
- Born: Paul Pellerin; 8 June 1941 Shediac, New Brunswick Canada

Professional wrestling career
- Ring name(s): Paul Peller; Black Spider; Butcher #2
- Billed height: 5"9
- Billed weight: 233 lb (106 kg)
- Debut: 1961
- Retired: 1991

Paul Pellerin (born June 8, 1941) was a Canadian professional wrestler who spent his career in Eastern Canada, Montreal and Calgary.

== Professional wrestling career ==
He began his wrestling career in 1961.

In 1965, he began his debut for Grand Prix Wrestling in New Brunswick. In 1970, he made his debut for Stampede Wrestling in Calgary with Bob Sweetan where they won the Stampede International Tag Team Championship. After vacating the titles in early 1971 they Peller left Stampede and returned to Grand Prix.

During the mid-1970s, Peller worked for the Eastern Sports Association based in Halifax, Nova Scotia.

In the early 1980s he worked for Montreal's Lutte Internationale. He continued to work for Grand Prix throughout the decade and became their promoter in 1986. Peller wrestled his last match in 1991 and resigned as promoter in 1992.

He would train WWE wrestler Kurrgan.

== Championships and accomplishments ==
- Stampede Wrestling
  - NWA International Tag Team Championship (Calgary version) (1 time) - with Bob Sweetan (1)
