= Bobby Nelson =

Canadian professional wrestler

Personal information
- Born: Charles Karass; 17 April 1917 Montreal, Quebec, Canada
- Died: 20 February 2002 (aged 84) Kenosha, Wisconsin, U.S.

Professional wrestling career
- Ring name(s): Bobby Nelson; Charles Karass; Bob Wilson; Golden Terror; Jimmy Nelson; Mystery Man; Zebra Kid
- Billed height: 6 ft 0 in (183 cm)
- Billed weight: 220 lb (100 kg)
- Debut: 1936
- Retired: 1959

Bobby Nelson (born Charles Karass; 17 April 1917 – 20 February 2002) was a Canadian-American professional wrestler and businessman who appeared frequently in the National Wrestling Alliance midwest territories beginning in 1936 and continuing through the 1950s.

== Professional wrestling career ==
Prior to his wrestling career, Nelson worked as a police officer in Milwaukee. He initially wrestled using his birth name, but soon began using ring names, most frequently appearing as Bobby Nelson. He was sometimes credited as being the name inspiration for, or the creator of, the Nelson series of wrestling holds, though these terms were in use since the 19th Century, with some historians speculating they were named for Horatio Nelson.

Nelson appeared as both a heel and face. National stars he wrestled include "Nature Boy" Buddy Rogers, The Crusher, Yukon Eric, Fritz Von Erich and Lou Thesz. He also engaged in a long-running series of regional grudge matches against The Bat. He occasionally appeared in tag team matches, including in Madison, Wisconsin with Dutch Hefner.

== Bobby Nelson Cheese Shop ==
Towards the end of his wrestling career, in 1949, Nelson opened Bobby Nelson Cheese Shop on what would become Interstate 94 in Kenosha, Wisconsin near to and competing with the Mars Cheese Castle. The shop sold various Wisconsin cheeses, sausages, Landjäger and other meat products, and condiments including jams and mustard, as well as German beer steins. After Nelson retired in 1978, the shop business was taken over by his daughter and her husband. The cheese shop has been often mentioned on air by Chicago disc jockey Steve Dahl. The shop closed in July 2019 upon the owner's retirement.
