= Geoff Portz =

British professional wrestler (1935–2015)

- Birth name: Geoff Portz
- Born: March 13, 1931 Bradford, England
- Died: 1 April 2016 (aged 85)

Professional wrestling career
- Ring name(s): Geoff Portz; Lord Geoffrey Portz; Mr. X Mr. X #2; OK Chief; Percy Nelson
- Billed height: 5 ft 10 in (178 cm)
- Billed weight: 220 lb (100 kg)
- Debut: 1951
- Retired: 1980

Geoff Portz (March 16, 1931 – April 1, 2016) was a British professional wrestler who worked in England, Japan, and the National Wrestling Alliance in the United States.

== Career ==
Portz made his wrestling debut in 1951 in the United Kingdom. In 1968, he worked in Japan's International Wrestling Enterprise.

In 1972, Portz made his debut in North America working for Stampede Wrestling in Calgary, Canada. Then in 1973, he made his debut in the United States for the American Wrestling Association in Minneapolis, Minnesota. In 1977, he worked for Jim Crockett Promotions.

Portz retired from wrestling in 1980.

== Personal life ==
Portz son, Scott McGhee wrestled for with Championship Wrestling from Florida, Jim Crockett Promotions, and the World Wrestling Federation in the 1980s.

== Death ==
Portz died on April 1, 2016.

== Championships and accomplishments ==
- Joint Promotions
  - British Empire/Commonwealth Heavyweight Championship (1 time)
  - British Heavyweight Championship (1 time)
  - British Mid-Heavyweight Championship (1 time)
- Stampede Wrestling
  - Stampede North American Heavyweight Championship (3 times)
  - NWA International Tag Team Championship (Calgary version) (1 time) - with Jeff Atcheson
  - Stampede Wrestling Hall of Fame (Class of 1995)
