= Dave Ruhl =

Canadian professional wrestler (1920–1988)

Personal information
- Born: August 12, 1920 Watts, Alberta, Canada
- Died: December 21, 1988 (aged 68) Medicine Hat, Alberta

Professional wrestling career
- Ring name(s): Dave Ruhl; The Hooded Wasp
- Billed height: 5 ft 10 in (1.78 m)
- Billed weight: 242 lb (110 kg)
- Debut: 1946
- Retired: 1974

Dave Ruhl (August 12, 1920 – December 21, 1988) was a Canadian professional wrestler who during his near 30-year career competed in North American regional promotions in Western Canada and the Canadian Prairies as well as in Japan and other international promotions. A longtime mainstay of Calgary-based Stampede Wrestling during the 1960s and early 70s, he engaged in memorable feuds with Sweet Daddy Siki and The Stomper over the Stampede North American Heavyweight Championship.

He was also a close associate of promoter Stu Hart and remained his top booker for much of his time in Stampede Wrestling.

== Career ==
Born in Watts, Alberta, Ruhl was living in nearby Hanna as a cattle grain farmer when he was encouraged to pursue a career in professional wrestling during the mid-1940s. Making his debut in 1946, he appeared with many later Stampede Wrestling veterans while in Stu Hart's Klondike Wrestling during the late 1940s.

By 1951, he began wrestling full-time and eventually defeated Al "Mr. Murder" Mills for the vacant NWA Canadian Championship in Calgary, Alberta on November 13, 1959 (although other sources claim Ruhl won the title in 1955). Continuing to tour North America with the National Wrestling Alliance during the next ten years, including the Arizona and Texas territories as the masked wrestler The Hooded Wasp, he would later win the NWA Canadian Heavyweight Championship a record six times defeating Sweet Daddy Siki, The Beast, Stan Stasiak, Danny Lynch and Abdullah the Butcher respectively. He would be the last NWA Canadian Heavyweight Champion, holding the title until being forced to surrender the championship due to injury in 1972.

Facing Gene Kiniski in a match for the NWA World Heavyweight Championship in Calgary on July 12, 1967, Ruhl eventually began competing for Stu Hart's Stampede Wrestling promotion during the late 1960s winning the Stampede North American Championship twice between 1969 and 1970 defeating The Stomper and Abdullah the Butcher respectively. Touring Japan in 1969 and again in 1972, he briefly held the Stampede International Tag Team Championship with Tiger Joe Tomasso in May 1972 although they lost the titles back to Chin Lee & Sugi Sito later that month. Suffering a career-ending injury in 1974 as a result of a head injury sustained in a fight with Carlos Colon, Ruhl retired to farm with his brother Henry and eventually died in Medicine Hat, Alberta on December 21, 1988.

== Championships and accomplishments ==
- Stampede Wrestling
  - NWA Canadian Heavyweight Championship (Calgary version) (8 times)
  - NWA International Tag Team Championship (Calgary version) (1 time) - with Tiger Joe Tomasso
  - Stampede North American Heavyweight Championship (2 times)
  - Stampede Wrestling Hall of Fame (Class of 1995)
