= Eddie Morrow =

Canadian professional wrestler

Edouard Etifier
Personal information
- Born: Edouard Etifier; 1936 (age 89–90) Martinique

Professional wrestling career
- Ring name: Eddie Morrow; Eddie Williams; Ed Morrow; Edouard Etifier; Jack Claybourne Jr. Pat Etifier
- Billed height: 5 ft 10 in (1.78 m)
- Billed weight: 238 lb (108 kg)
- Debut: 1966
- Retired: 1978

Edouard Etifier (born 1936), better known as Eddie Morrow, is a retired Martinican professional wrestler.

He is the brother of Gerard Etifier (aka Gerry/Jerry Morrow).

He wrestled as Jack Claybourne (Junior) in Australia, New Zealand, and Japan. A reference to the African American wrestler of the 1930s-1960, Jack Claybourne.

== Championships and accomplishments ==
- 50th State Big Time Wrestling

- NWA North American Heavyweight Championship (Hawaii version) (1 time)

- All Star Pro Wrestling

- NWA British Empire/Commonwealth Championship (New Zealand version) (1 time)

- NWA All-Star Wrestling

- NWA Canadian Tag Team Championship (Vancouver version) (1 time) - with Gerry Morrow

- Stampede Wrestling

- Stampede International Tag Team Championship (4 times) - with Gerry Morrow (3 times) and Gama Singh (1 time)
- Stampede North American Heavyweight Championship (1 time)
