= Gerry Morrow =

Canadian professional wrestler (1949–2025)

Gerard Etifier
Personal information
- Born: September 10, 1949 Le Prêcheur, Martinique
- Died: July 28, 2025 (aged 75)

Professional wrestling career
- Ring name: Gerry Morrow; Jerry Morrow; El Mercenario #2; Jiro Inazuma; The Killer; Champgene
- Billed height: 6 ft 0 in (1.83 m)
- Billed weight: 240 lb (110 kg)
- Debut: 1971
- Retired: 2002

Gerard Etifier (September 10, 1949 – July 28, 2025), better known by his ring name as Gerry Morrow, was a Martinique-born Canadian professional wrestler known for his work in Canada and Japan during the 1970s and 1980s.

== Career ==
Morrow moved to Paris, France, to complete his obligation in the French military service. He would make his wrestling debut in 1971 in Japan for International Wrestling Enterprise.

In 1975, he made his debut in North America for Stampede Wrestling in Calgary. Teamed up with his brother Eddie as “The Morrow Brothers” and together held 3 International tag team championships. He was awarded his 4th International tag team title alongside George Wells in 1978. He worked for Stampede until its closure in 1989.

Then, in 1977, he made his debut in Vancouver for All-Star Wrestling, where he worked until 1985. He traveled around the world, competing in Canada, Japan, Germany, Puerto Rico, Singapore, South Africa, South Korea and New Zealand.

After Stampede closed in 1989, Morrow returned to Puerto Rico and Japan. Later in his career, he worked in Western Canada, Winnipeg, South Africa, and various Japanese promotions.

He retired from wrestling in 2002.

== Death ==
Morrow died on July 28, 2025, at the age of 75. He was the brother of Eddie Morrow.

== Championships and accomplishments ==
- Atlantic Grand Prix Wrestling
  - AGPW North American Tag Team Championship (1 time); with Cuban Assassin
- Canadian Rocky Mountain Wrestling

- Canadian Rocky Mountain Wrestling North American Heavyweight Title (1 time)

- International Championship Wrestling

- International Championship Wrestling Tag Team Title (2 times) - with Sumito (1 time), Gama Singh (1 time)

- NWA All-Star Wrestling
  - NWA Canadian Tag Team Championship (Vancouver version) (1 time) - with Eddie Morrow
- Prairie Wrestling Alliance
  - PWA Hall of Fame - 2008
- Stampede Wrestling

- Stampede International Tag Team Championship (7 times) - with Eddie Morrow (3 times), George Wells (1 time), Makhan Singh (1 time), Cuban Assassin (2 times)

- World Wrestling Council

- WWC North American Tag Team Championship (1 time) – with Cuban Assassin
- WWC World Tag Team Championship (1 time) – with Cuban Assassin
- WWC Caribbean Tag Team Championship (1 time) – with Cuban Assassin

- West Four Wrestling Alliance

- WFWA Canadian Heavyweight Championship (1 time)
