= Biff Wellington =

Canadian professional wrestler (1963–2007)

Personal information
- Born: Shayne Alexander Bower; April 18, 1963 Calgary, Alberta, Canada
- Died: c. June 24, 2007 (aged 44) Calgary, Alberta, Canada
- Children: 1

Professional wrestling career
- Ring name(s): Beef Wellington; Biff Wellington; Buddy Hart
- Billed height: 6 ft 0 in (1.83 m)
- Billed weight: 226 lb (103 kg)
- Trained by: Hart Family; Hiroshi Hase; Mr. Hito
- Debut: 1986
- Retired: 2000

Shayne Alexander Bower (April 18, 1963 – c. June 24, 2007), better known by his ring name Biff Wellington, was a Canadian professional wrestler who was born, raised, and died in Calgary, Alberta, Canada.

== Professional wrestling career ==
Shayne Bower trained with the Hart Brothers school by Keith Hart, Mr. Hito and Hiroshi Hase. He made his debut in December 1986 using the name "Biff Wellington" in Stampede Wrestling as a villain, but then transitioned to a fan favourite, which he was for the remainder of his time there. In Stampede, Wellington frequently tagged with Chris Benoit. In 1989, Wellington and Benoit beat Makhan Singh and Vokhan Singh to become Stampede Wrestling's International Tag Team Champions.

After Stampede Wrestling shut down in December 1989, Wellington worked in various promotions in Canada, such as the Canadian National Wrestling Alliance (CNWA) and Canadian Rocky Mountain Wrestling (CRMW).

Wellington then received tryouts for the World Wrestling Federation at the Olympic Saddledome in Calgary, Alberta during a live event on July 8 and the next night, July 9, at the Northlands Coliseum in Edmonton, Alberta, with Wellington beating fellow Canadian Hugh Thomas with a tombstone piledriver (kneeling belly-to-belly piledriver). Despite impressing WWF management, Wellington did not receive a contract with the WWF and returned to the Canadian indies.

In June 1992, Wellington and Benoit appeared in World Championship Wrestling at Clash of the Champions XIX, representing Canada in the NWA World Tag Team Championship tournament; they were defeated by Brian Pillman and Jushin "Thunder" Liger in the first round. Later that year, Wellington was recognized as the first CRMW North American Heavyweight Champion.

Between 1988 and 1994, Wellington worked on 28 consecutive tours with New Japan Pro-Wrestling. In Japan, he feuded with Jushin Thunder Liger and continued to team with Benoit, who was known in Japan as the "Pegasus Kid" or "Wild Pegasus". He also worked in the Maritimes as Buddy Hart, and in Mexico.

Wellington had a brief stint in Extreme Championship Wrestling between 1995 and 1996. He sustained an eye injury in an accident during a match against Taz in May 1996. Wellington then became dependent on prescription medication to prevent nerves in his eye from dying. He retired from active competition after the incident, although he occasionally wrestled in promotions near his hometown such as Extreme Canadian Championship Wrestling.

A year later in 1997, Wellington returned to Calgary wrestling until his last match in 2000.

== Personal life ==
He had a daughter named Alexandra Shayne Bower from a previous relationship.

== Death ==
In later years, Bower had multiple health issues, mostly stemming from his back. He also experienced strokes.

On June 24, 2007, Bower's parents, who were concerned because they hadn't heard from him in four days, went to his home and discovered that he had died. Medical officials believe he had been dead for a few days of a heart attack at the age of 44. Coincidentally, his body was found on the same day that his friend and former tag partner, Chris Benoit, killed himself.

== Championships and accomplishments ==
- Canadian Rocky Mountain Wrestling
  - CRMW North American Heavyweight Championship (1 time)
- Can-Am Wrestling Federation
  - Can-Am Heavyweight Championship (1 Time)
- Pro Wrestling Illustrated
  - Ranked No.420 of the top 500 singles wrestlers in the PWI 500 in 2007.
- Stampede Wrestling
  - Stampede International Tag Team Championship (1 time) – with Chris Benoit

== See also ==
- List of premature professional wrestling deaths
