= Stampede Wrestling International Tag Team Championship =

Professional wrestling tag team championship

Details
- Promotion: Stampede Wrestling
- Date established: 1958; 2000
- Date retired: 1989; 2008

Other name
- NWA International Tag Team Championship (Calgary version)
Statistics
- First champions: The Kalmikoffs (Ivan and Karol Kalmikoff)
- Final champions: The Elite (Chris Steele and Pete Wilson)
- Most reigns: Team: The Flying Scotts (George and Sandy Scott) (6 times); Individual: Keith Hart (9 times)
- Longest reign: The A-Team (Dusty Adonis and Michael Avery) (280 days)
- Shortest reign: Ron Etchinson and Dominic Bravo, George and Sandy Scott, Art and Stan Neilson (1 day)

The Stampede International Tag Team Championship was the main tag team title in the Canadian professional wrestling promotion Stampede Wrestling. It was created in 1958 as the NWA International Tag Team Championship (Calgary version). When promoter Stu Hart resigned from the National Wrestling Alliance in 1982, the title was renamed the Stampede International Tag Team Championship. When Stampede wrestling closed down in 1989, the titles were retired, but brought back in 2000 when Stampede Wrestling was restarted by Bruce Hart and Ross Hart, and remained active until the promotion closed again in 2008.

== Title history ==
Key
No.	Overall reign number
Reign	Reign number for the specific team—reign numbers for the individuals are in parentheses, if different
Days	Number of days held

No.	Champion	Championship change			Reign statistics		Notes	Ref.
No.	Champion	Date	Event	Location	Reign	Days	Notes	Ref.
1	The Kalmikoffs (Ivan and Karol)	February 28, 1958	Stampede show	Calgary, Alberta	1	127		
2	The Tolos Brothers (Chris Tolos and John Tolos)	July 5, 1958	Stampede show	N/A	1	119		
3	The Flying Scotts (George and Sandy)	November 1, 1958	Stampede show	Calgary, Alberta	1	90		
4	The Vachons (Maurice and Paul)	January 30, 1959	Stampede show	Calgary, Alberta	1	3		
—	Vacated	February 2, 1959	—	—	—	—	Championship vacated after a match against the Flying Scotts	
5	The Flying Scotts (George and Sandy)	February 2, 1959	Stampede show	Regina, Saskatchewan	2	31	Defeated Maurice and Paul Vachon for the vacant titles.	
6	Chico Garcia and Chet Wallick	March 5, 1959	Stampede show	Regina, Saskatchewan	1	2		
7	The Vachons (Maurice and Paul)	March 7, 1959	Stampede show	N/A	2	20		
8	Shag Thomas and Mighty Ursus	March 27, 1959	Stampede show	Calgary, Alberta	1	28		
9	The Vachons (Maurice and Paul)	April 24, 1959	Stampede show	N/A	3	7		
10	The Flying Scotts (George and Sandy)	May 1, 1959	Stampede show	Calgary, Alberta	3	231		
11	Al Mills and Don Kindred	December 18, 1959	Stampede show	N/A	1	46		
—	Vacated	February 2, 1960	—	—	—	—	Championship vacated when Mills suffered an extended illness.	
12	Don Kindred (2) and John Foti	March 11, 1960	Stampede show	N/A	1	35	Kindred and Foti were also recognized as "IWA Tag Team champions".	
13	Oattem Fisher and Luther Lindsay	April 15, 1960	Stampede show	Calgary, Alberta	1	42		
14	Tarzan Tourville and Mighty Ursus (2)	May 27, 1960	Stampede show	Calgary, Alberta	1	35		
15	Jim Wright and Gypsy Joe	July 1, 1960	Stampede show	N/A	1	92		
—	Vacated	October 1, 1960	—	—	—	—	Championship vacated when Gypsy Joe left Stampede Wrestling	
16	Jim Wright (2) and Chico Garcia (2)	October 14, 1960	Stampede show	Calgary, Alberta	1	0	Defeated Ed Francis and Luigi Mecera to win the vacant titles.	
17	The Brunettis (Guy Brunetti and Joe Brunetti)	February 24, 1961	Stampede show	N/A	1	275		
—	Vacated	July 16, 1961	—	—	—	—	Championship vacated the Brunettis no show a title match.	
18	Tiny Mills and Jack Daniels	November 24, 1961	Stampede show	Calgary, Alberta	1	14	Won tournament to crown new champions.	
19	The Torres Brothers (Alberto and Ramón)	December 8, 1961	Stampede show	Calgary, Alberta	1	144		
—	Vacated	May 1, 1962	—	—	—	—	Championship vacated when the Torres brothers left Stampede Wrestling	
20	Alexis Bruga and Aldo Bogni	May 3, 1962	Stampede show	Regina, Saskatchewan	1	8	Defeat John Foti and Bill Wright in a tournament final.	
21	Sandor Kovacs and Czaya Nandor	May 11, 1962	Stampede show	Calgary, Alberta	1	6		
22	Alexis Bruga and Aldo Bogni	May 17, 1962	Stampede show	Regina, Saskatchewan	2	7		
23	Sandor Kovacs and Czaya Nandor	May 24, 1962	Stampede show	Calgary, Alberta	2	222		
24	Jim Wright (3) and Mike Sharpe, Sr.	January 1, 1963	Stampede show	N/A	1	17		
25	Dominic Bravo and Ron Etchison	January 18, 1963	Stampede show	Calgary, Alberta	1	25		
26	Jim Wright (4) and Luke Graham	February 12, 1963	Stampede show	N/A	1	2		
27	Dominic Bravo and Ron Etchison	February 14, 1963	Stampede show	Regina, Saskatchewan	2	14		
28	Jerry Graham and Jim Wright (5)	February 28, 1963	Stampede show	Calgary, Alberta	1	21		
29	Dominic Bravo and Ron Etchison	March 21, 1963	Stampede show	N/A	3	1		
30	Jim Wright (6) and Masked Destroyer	March 22, 1963	Stampede show	Calgary, Alberta	1	21		
31	Ricky Waldo and Karl von Schober	April 12, 1963	Stampede show	Calgary, Alberta	1	21		
32	Jim Wright (7) and Masked Destroyer (2)	May 3, 1963	Stampede show	N/A	2	80		
33	Kenji Shibuya and Mitsu Arakawa	July 22, 1963	Stampede show	N/A	1	99		
34	Ron Etchison (4) and Dan Miller	October 29, 1963	Stampede show	Calgary, Alberta	1	28		
35	The Flying Scotts (George and Sandy)	November 26, 1963	Stampede show	Edmonton, Alberta	4	1	Also billed as NAWA Title.	
36	Art and Stan Neilson	November 27, 1963	Stampede show	Saskatoon, Saskatchewan	1	1		
37	The Flying Scotts (George and Sandy)	November 28, 1963	Stampede show	Edmonton, Alberta	5	1		
38	Art and Stan Neilson	November 29, 1963	Stampede show	Calgary, Alberta	2	21		
39	The Flying Scotts (George and Sandy)	December 20, 1963	Stampede show	Calgary, Alberta	6	1,239		
40	The Von Steigers (Kurt and Karl)	May 12, 1967	Stampede show	Calgary, Alberta	1	35		
41	The Christys (Bobby and Jerry)	June 16, 1967	Stampede show	Calgary, Alberta	1	25		
—	Vacated	July 11, 1967	—	—	—	—	Championship vacated after a match against the Beast and Bob Sweetan	
42	The Beast and Bob Sweetan	July 12, 1967	Stampede show	Calgary, Alberta	1	541	won the rematch against The Christys.	
43	Jos Leduc and Paul Leduc	January 3, 1969	Stampede show	N/A	1	64		
44	Bud and Ray Osborne	March 8, 1969	Stampede show	N/A	1	24		
45	Bob Sweetan (2) and Fred Sweetan	April 1, 1969	Stampede show	Edmonton, Alberta	1	17		
46	Bud and Ray Osborne	April 18, 1969	Stampede show	Calgary, Alberta	2	80		
47	Clem St. Louis and Jack Pesek	July 7, 1969	Stampede show	N/A	1	162		
48	Bud and Ray Osborne	December 16, 1969	Stampede show	Calgary, Alberta	3	1		
49	Gil Hayes and Bill Dromo	December 17, 1969	Stampede show	N/Aj	1	2		
50	The Christys (Bobby and Jerry)	December 19, 1969	Stampede show	Calgary, Alberta	2	56		
51	Gil Hayes and Bill Dromo	February 13, 1970	Stampede show	Calgary, Alberta	2	21		
52	The Christys (Bobby and Jerry)	March 6, 1970	Stampede show	Calgary, Alberta	3	112		
53	Gil Hayes (3) and Bob Sweetan (3)	June 26, 1970	Stampede show	N/A	1	7		
54	Bud and Ray Osborne	July 3, 1970	Stampede show	N/A	4	63		
55	The Christys (Bobby and Jerry)	September 4, 1970	Stampede show	Calgary, Alberta	4	32		
56	Bob Sweetan (4) and Paul Peller	October 6, 1970	Stampede show	N/A	1	172		
—	Vacated	March 27, 1971	—	—	—	—	Championship vacated when Sweetan left Stampede Wrestling	
57	Earl Black and Tiger Joe Tomasso	July 9, 1971	Stampede show	N/A	1	32	Won tournament.	
58	Dan Kroffat and Bill Cody	August 10, 1971	Stampede show	N/A	1	1		
59	Earl Black and Tiger Joe Tomasso	August 11, 1971	Stampede show	Saskatoon, Saskatchewan	2	51		
60	Michel Martel and Danny Babich	October 1, 1971	Stampede show	Calgary, Alberta	1	15		
61	Chin Lee and Sugi Sito	October 16, 1971	Stampede show	Calgary, Alberta	1	97		
62	Tiger Joe Tomasso (3) and Dave Ruhl	January 21, 1972	Stampede show	Calgary, Alberta	1	106		
63	Chin Lee and Sugi Sito	May 6, 1972	Stampede show	Calgary, Alberta	2	83		
64	Geoff Portz and Jeff Atcheson	July 28, 1972	Stampede show	N/A	1	63		
65	Tor Kamata and Sugi Sito (3)	September 29, 1972	Stampede show	N/A	1	42		
66	Dan Kroffat (2) and Lenny Hurst	November 10, 1972	Stampede show	N/A	1	9		
67	Tiger Joe Tomasso (4) and Gil Hayes (4)	November 19, 1972	Stampede show	N/A	1	26		
68	Michel Martel and Danny Babich	December 15, 1972	Stampede show	N/A	2	1		
69	George Gordienko and Super Hawk	December 16, 1972	Stampede show	N/A	1	7		
70	Michel Martel and Danny Babich	December 23, 1972	Stampede show	N/A	3	28		
71	Dan Kroffat (3) and Lenny Hurst	January 20, 1973	Stampede show	Edmonton, Alberta	2	20		
72	Michel Martel and Danny Babich	February 9, 1973	Stampede show	Calgary, Alberta	4	63		
73	Carlos Belafonte and Gino Caruso	April 13, 1973	Stampede show	N/A	1	(Note: The exact date Belafonte and Caruso lost the championship is uncertain, which means that their reign lasted between 18 and 48 days.)		
—	Vacated	May 4, 1973	—	—	—	—	Championship vacated when Belafonte was injured.	
74	The Wild Samoans (Afa and Sika)	May 25, 1973	Stampede show	N/A	1	(Note: The exact date Belafonte and Caruso lost the championship is uncertain, which means that their reign lasted between 1 and 30 days.)	Win a 10-tag team tournament final.	
75	Chatti Yokouchi and Yasu Fuji	June 8, 1973	Stampede show	N/A	1	35		
76	Dan Kroffat (4) and Bill Cody (2)	July 13, 1973	Stampede show	Calgary, Alberta	1	7		
77	Gil Hayes (5) and Benny Ramírez	July 20, 1973	Stampede show	Calgary, Alberta	1	41		
78	The Wild Samoans (Afa and Sika)	August 30, 1973	Stampede show	N/A	2	9		
79	Chatti Yokouchi and Yasu Fuji	September 8, 1973	Stampede show	Edmonton, Alberta	2	27		
80	Bob Pringle and Bill Cody (3)	October 5, 1973	Stampede show	Calgary, Alberta	1	92		
81	The Kiwis (Sweet William and Nick Carter)	January 5, 1974	Stampede show	Calgary, Alberta	1	123		
82	Tokyo Joe and Great Saki	May 8, 1974	Stampede show	Calgary, Alberta	1	0		
83	The Kiwis (Sweet William and Nick Carter)	March 22, 1974	Stampede show	N/A	2	117		
84	Stan Kowalski and Duke Savage	July 17, 1974	Stampede show	N/A	1	18		
85	Rick Martel and Lenny Hurst (3)	August 4, 1974	Stampede show	N/A	1	75		
86	Pat and Mike Kelly	October 18, 1974	Stampede show	N/A	1	98		
87	Frankie Laine and Len Thornton	January 24, 1975	Stampede show	Calgary, Alberta	1	98		
88	Mr. Hito (2) and John Quinn	May 2, 1975	Stampede show	N/A	1	105	Mr. Hito previously held the championship under the name "Tokyo Joe"	
—	Vacated	August 15, 1975	—	—	—	—	Championship vacated when Mr. Hito went to Japan	
89	Mr. Hito (3) and Gil Hayes (6)	December 12, 1975	Stampede show	N/A	1	14	Won tournament	
90	Ed and Jerry Morrow	December 26, 1975	Stampede show	Calgary, Alberta	1	56		
91	Ripper Collins and Don Gagne	February 20, 1976	Stampede show	N/A	1	42		
92	Lumberjack Luke and Prince Tapu	April 2, 1976	Stampede show	Calgary, Alberta	1	7		
93	Ripper Collins (2) and Bobby Bass	April 9, 1976	Stampede show	N/A	1	28		
94	Gama Singh and Crary Stevenson	May 7, 1976	Stampede show	N/A	1	25		
95	Ed Morrow (2) and Gama Singh (2)	June 1, 1976	N/A	N/A	1	17	Morrow replaced Crary Stevenson.	
96	Mr. Hito (4) and Higo Hamaguchi	June 18, 1976	Stampede show	Calgary, Alberta	1	70		
97	Ed (3) and Jerry Morrow (2)	August 27, 1976	Stampede show	Calgary, Alberta	2	28		
98	Ripper Collins (3) and Larry Sharpe	September 24, 1976	Stampede show	Calgary, Alberta	1	21		
99	Ed (4) and Jerry Morrow (3)	October 15, 1976	Stampede show	Calgary, Alberta	3	49		
100	The Cuban Assassins (Cuban Assassin #1 and Cuban Assassin #2)	December 3, 1976	Stampede show	N/A	1	77		
101	Leo Burke and Keith Hart	February 18, 1977	Stampede show	N/A	1	47		
102	The Royal Kangaroos (Jonathan Boyd and Norman Frederick Charles III)	April 6, 1977	Stampede show	N/A	1	163		
103	Leo Burke (2) and Bobby Burke	September 16, 1977	Stampede show	N/A	1	85		
104	Mr. Hito (5) and Michel Martel (4)	December 10, 1977	Stampede show	Edmonton, Alberta	1	69		
105	Jerry Morrow (4) and George Wells	February 17, 1978	Stampede show	Calgary, Alberta	1	2		
106	Norman Frederick Charles III (2) and Cuban Assassin (2)	February 19, 1978	Stampede show	N/A	1	69		
107	Keith Hart (2) and Hubert Gallant	April 29, 1978	Stampede show	N/A	1	125		
108	The Castillo Brothers (Raul and Fidel)	September 1, 1978	Stampede show	N/A	1	72		
109	The Hart Family (Keith (3) and Bret)	November 12, 1978	Stampede show	Edmonton, Alberta	1	90		
110	Mr. Hito (6) and Mr. Sakurada	February 10, 1979	Stampede show	Calgary, Alberta	1	55		
111	Leo Burke (3) and Keith Hart (4)	April 6, 1979	Stampede show	Calgary, Alberta	2	91		
112	Dory Funk, Jr. and Larry Lane	July 6, 1979	Stampede show	N/A	1	1		
113	Mr. Hito (7) and Mr. Sakurada	July 7, 1979	Stampede show	Edmonton, Alberta	2	53		
114	The Hart Family (Keith (5) and Bret)	August 29, 1979	Stampede show	N/A	2	44		
—	Vacated	October 12, 1979	—	—	—	—	Championship vacated when Bret Hart won the Stampede British Commonwealth Mid-Heavyweight Championship.	
115	Dynamite Kid and Sekigawa	December 21, 1979	Stampede show	Calgary, Alberta	1	36	Defeat Leo Burke and Hubert Gallant in tournament final.	
116	The Hart Family (Keith (6) and Bret)	January 26, 1980	Stampede show	N/A	3	63		
117	Dynamite Kid (2) and Loch Ness Monster	March 29, 1980	Stampede show	N/A	1	20		
118	The Hart Family (Keith (7) and Bret)	April 18, 1980	Stampede show	N/A	4	46		
119	Dynamite Kid (3) and Kasavubu	June 3, 1980	Stampede show	Regina, Saskatchewan	1	23		
120	The Hart Family (Keith (8) and Bret)	June 26, 1980	Stampede show	N/A	5	34		
121	Kasavubu (2) and Mr. Sakurada (3)	July 30, 1980	Stampede show	N/A	1	59		
122	Jim Neidhart and Hercules Ayala	September 27, 1980	Stampede show	N/A	1	56		
123	Duke Myers and Bobby Bass (2)	November 22, 1980	Stampede show	N/A	1	10		
124	Leo Burke (4) and Bobby Burke	December 2, 1980	Stampede show	Creston, British Columbia	2	74		
125	Duke Myers (2) and Mike Sharpe Jr.	February 14, 1981	Stampede show	N/A	1	223		
126	Duke Myers (3) and Kerry Brown	September 25, 1981	Stampede show	N/A	1	157	Sharpe and Brown split in September 1981 both chose new tag team partners and had a match.	
—	Vacated	March 1, 1982	—	—	—	—	Championship vacated when Brown and Myers are involved in a car accident.	
127	Duke Myers (4) and Kerry Brown	March 23, 1982	Stampede show	Regina, Saskatchewan	2	9	Defeat David Schultz and Leo Burke in tournament final.	
128	Bruce Hart and Davey Boy Smith	April 1, 1982	Stampede show	N/A	1	89		
129	Duke Myers (5) and Dynamite Kid (4)	June 29, 1982	Stampede show	N/A	1	143		
130	Leo Burke (5) and Bret Hart (6)	November 19, 1982	Stampede show	Calgary, Alberta	1	19		
131	Duke Myers (6) and Kerry Brown	December 8, 1982	Stampede show	Edmonton, Alberta	3	93		
132	Jim Neidhart (2) and Mr. Hito (8)	March 11, 1983	Stampede show	Calgary, Alberta	1	182		
133	Cuban Assassin (3) and Francisco Flores	September 9, 1983	Stampede show	Calgary, Alberta	1	40		
134	Bruce Hart and Davey Boy Smith	October 19, 1983	Stampede show	N/A	2	131		
135	Nightmare Danny Davis and Hubert Gallant (2)	February 27, 1984	Stampede show	Vancouver, British Columbia	1	25		
—	Vacated	March 23, 1984	—	—	—	—	Championship vacated after a match against Phil Lafleur and Ben Bassarab.	
136	The British Bulldogs (Dynamite Kid (5) and Davey Boy Smith (3))	March 31, 1984	Stampede show	Calgary, Alberta	1	8	Defeat Bad News Allen and Cuban Assassin in tournament final.	
—	Vacated	August 23, 1984	—	—	—	—	Championship vacated when promotion was sold to the World Wrestling Federation. Dynamite Kid and Davey Boy Smith join WWF,	
137	Honky Tonk Wayne and Ron Starr	October 25, 1985	Stampede show	Calgary, Alberta	1	105	Defeat Kerry Brown and Hubert Gallant in tournament final.	
138	Leo Burke (6) and Ron Ritchie	February 7, 1986	Stampede show	Calgary, Alberta	1	0		
—	Vacated	February 7, 1986	—	—	—	—	Championship vacated when Starr and Wayne ran off with the belts.	
139	Honky Tonk Wayne Ferris and Ron Starr	February 21, 1986	Stampede show	Calgary, Alberta	2	8	Defeated Burke and Ritchie in rematch.	
140	Chris Benoit and Ben Bassarab	March 1, 1986	Stampede show	Regina, Saskatchewan	1	20		
141	Honky Tonk Wayne Ferris (3) and Cuban Assassin (4)	March 21, 1986	Stampede show	Calgary, Alberta	1	42		
142	Chris Benoit (2) and Keith Hart (9)	May 2, 1986	Stampede show	Calgary, Alberta	1	28		
—	Vacated	May 30, 1986	—	Calgary, Alberta	—	—	Championship vacated after a match against Duke Meyers and Kerry Brown	
143	Duke Myers (7) and Kerry Brown (4)	June 6, 1986	Stampede show	Calgary, Alberta	4	63	Defeated Benoit and Hart in rematch.	
144	Ben Bassarab (2) and Owen Hart	August 8, 1986	Stampede show	Edmonton, Alberta	1	56		
145	The Viet Cong Express (Hiroshi Hase and Fumihiro Niikura)	October 3, 1986	Stampede show	Calgary, Alberta	1	(Note: The exact date the championship was vacated is uncertain, which means that the championship reign lasted between 90 and 120 days.)		
—	Vacated	January 10, 1987	—	—	—	—	Championship vacated when Niikura returned to Japan and suffered health problems.	
146	Bad Company (Bruce Hart (3) and Brian Pillman)	April 5, 1987	Stampede show	Calgary, Alberta	1	187	Defeated Cuban Assassin and Ron Starr in tournament final.	
—	Vacated	October 9, 1987	—	—	—	—	Championship vacated after a match against Karachi Vice	
147	Karachi Vice (Makhan Singh and Jerry Morrow (5))	November 11, 1987	Stampede show	Great Falls, Montana	1	2	Won the rematch.	
148	Bad Company (Bruce Hart (4) and Brian Pillman ) (2)	November 13, 1987	Stampede show	Calgary, Alberta	2	252		
149	The Cuban Commandos (Jerry Morrow (6) and Cuban Assassin (5))	July 22, 1988	Stampede show	Calgary, Alberta	1	77		
150	Chris Benoit (3) and Lance Idol	October 7, 1988	Stampede show	Calgary, Alberta	1	21		
151	The Cuban Commandos (Jerry Morrow (7) and Cuban Assassin (6))	October 28, 1988	Stampede show	Calgary, Alberta	2	45		
152	The British Bulldogs (Dynamite Kid (6) and Davey Boy Smith (4))	December 12, 1988	Stampede show	Calgary, Alberta	2	18		
153	Karachi Vice; Makhan Singh (2) and Vokkan Singh)	December 30, 1988	Stampede show	Calgary, Alberta	1	95		
154	Chris Benoit (4) and Biff Wellington	April 4, 1989	Stampede show	Calgary, Alberta	1	66		
155	Bob and Kerry Brown (5)	June 9, 1989	Stampede show	Calgary, Alberta	1	70		
156	Benkei Sasaki and Sumo Hara	August 18, 1989	Stampede show	Calgary, Alberta	1	42		
157	The Blackhearts (Apocalypse and Destruction)	September 29, 1989	Stampede show	Calgary, Alberta	1	56		
—	Deactivated	November 24, 1989	—	—	—	—	Stampede Wrestling closed	
158	Greg Pawluk and Johnny Devine	February 4, 2000	Stampede show	Calgary, Alberta	1	126	Defeated Dick Raines and Tiger Mahatma Khan in tournament final	
159	Dick Raines and Frank Einstein	June 9, 2000	Stampede show	Calgary, Alberta	1	33		
—	Vacated	July 12, 2000	—	—	—	—	Championship vacated for undocumented reasons	
160	Bruce Hart (5) and Teddy Hart	April 5, 2002	Stampede show	Calgary, Alberta	1		Defeated Dave Swift and Apocalypse in tournament final	
161	Bruce Hart (6) and TJ Wilson	April 2002	Stampede show	Calgary, Alberta	1		Wilson replaced the injured Teddy Hart. Still champions as of September 6, 2002.	
—		September 6, 2002 - March 26, 2004	—	—			Undocumented history.	
162	Harry Smith and Apocalypse	March 26, 2004	Stampede show	Calgary, Alberta	1	729	Defeated Dave Swift and Johnny Devine in tournament final	
—	Vacated	April 3, 2004	—	—	—	—	Championship vacated when Smith and Apocalypse split up.	
163	Apocalypse (2) and Dave Swift	April 4, 2004	Stampede show	Calgary, Alberta	1	54	Defeat Harry Smith and Johnny Devine.	
164	Harry Smith (2) and Kirk Melnick	May 28, 2004	Stampede show	Calgary, Alberta	1	175		
165	Duke Durango and Karnage	November 19, 2004	Stampede show	Calgary, Alberta	1	105	Dick Durango previously held the championship under the name Dick Raines	
166	New Karachi Vice (Tiger Raj Singh and Gama Singh, Jr.)	March 4, 2005	Stampede show	Calgary, Alberta	1	245		
167	Randy Myers and Pete Wilson	November 4, 2005	Stampede show	Calgary, Alberta	1	42		
168	New Karachi Vice (Tiger Raj Singh and Gama Singh Jr.)	December 16, 2005	Stampede show	Calgary, Alberta	2	196		
169	Duke Durango (2) and Chris Steele	June 30, 2006	Stampede show	Calgary, Alberta	1	28		
170	Juggernaut and Pete Wilson (2)	July 28, 2006	Stampede show	Calgary, Alberta	1	114		
171	Juggernaut (2) and TJ Wilson (2)	November 19, 2006	Stampede show	Calgary, Alberta	1	83	T.J. replaced the injured Pete Wilson	
172	The A-Team (Dusty Adonis and Michael Avery)	February 10, 2007	Stampede show	Calgary, Alberta	1	279	Lost to Juggernaut and Wilson in a title match but were awarded the belts since Wilson was leaving the promotion for WWE.	
173	Funky Bunch (Marky Mark and Phoenix Taylor)	November 16, 2007	Stampede show	Calgary, Alberta	1	119		
174	The Elite (Chris Steele (2) and Pete Wilson (3))	March 14, 2008	Stampede show	Calgary, Alberta	1	43		
—	Deactivated	April 26, 2008	—	—	—	—	Stampede Wrestling closed.	
