= Tiger Joe Tomasso =

Canadian professional wrestler (1922–1988)

Joe Tomasso
Personal information
- Born: Joseph DiTomasso; 1922 Montreal, Quebec, Canada
- Died: April 30, 1988 (aged 65–66)

Professional wrestling career
- Ring name(s): Assassin; Assassin #2; The Bat; Joe Tomasso; Tiger Tomasso; Tiger Joe Tomasso; Tiger 'Tweet Tweet' Tomasso
- Debut: 1952
- Retired: 1976

Joseph DiTomasso (1922 – April 30, 1988) was a Canadian professional wrestler, better known by his ring name Tiger Joe Tomasso. He is most known from his matches in Stampede Wrestling and American Wrestling Association.

== Early life ==
DiTomasso was born in Montreal, Quebec, but moved to Hamilton, Ontario at a young age.

== Professional wrestling career ==
Tomasso debuted in 1952 for Stampede Wrestling, then known as Big Time Wrestling, where he lost his debut match against George Scott. His second match was against Stu Hart where he once again lost. In his third match, Joe, Chico Garcia and Ripper Leone defeated George Scott, Sandy Scott and Sugy Hayamaka.

During the 1950s, he engaged in a long-running series of NWA regional American midwest grudge matches against Bobby Nelson.

In 1960, Tomasso was defeated by Bob Rasmussen in one of his first American Wrestling Association matches.

In 1976, Joe was defeated by Karl von Schotz. After two years of not wrestling, Tomasso had his last wrestling match in 1980 where he defeated Smith Hart by disqualification.

== Personal life ==
According to wrestling book Pain and Passion: The History of Stampede Wrestling, Tomasso was in a friendly "clique of Alberta wrestlers", including Tiny Mills.

== Championships and accomplishments ==
- National Wrestling Alliance
  - NWA Idaho Heavyweight Championship (2 times)
  - NWA Western Heavyweight Championship (2 times)
  - NWA Western Tag Team Championship/NWA World Tag Team Championship (4 times) - with Rocky Monroe, Mitsu Arakawa, Tony Borne and Eric The Great
- Stampede Wrestling
  - Stampede Wrestling International Tag Team Championship (4 times) - with Gil Hayes, Earl Black and Dave Ruhl
  - Stampede Wrestling Hall of Fame (Class of 1995)
- World Wrestling Association
  - WWA World Tag Team Championship (3 times) - with Assassin #1
