= Frenchy Martin =

Canadian professional wrestler and manager (1947-2016)

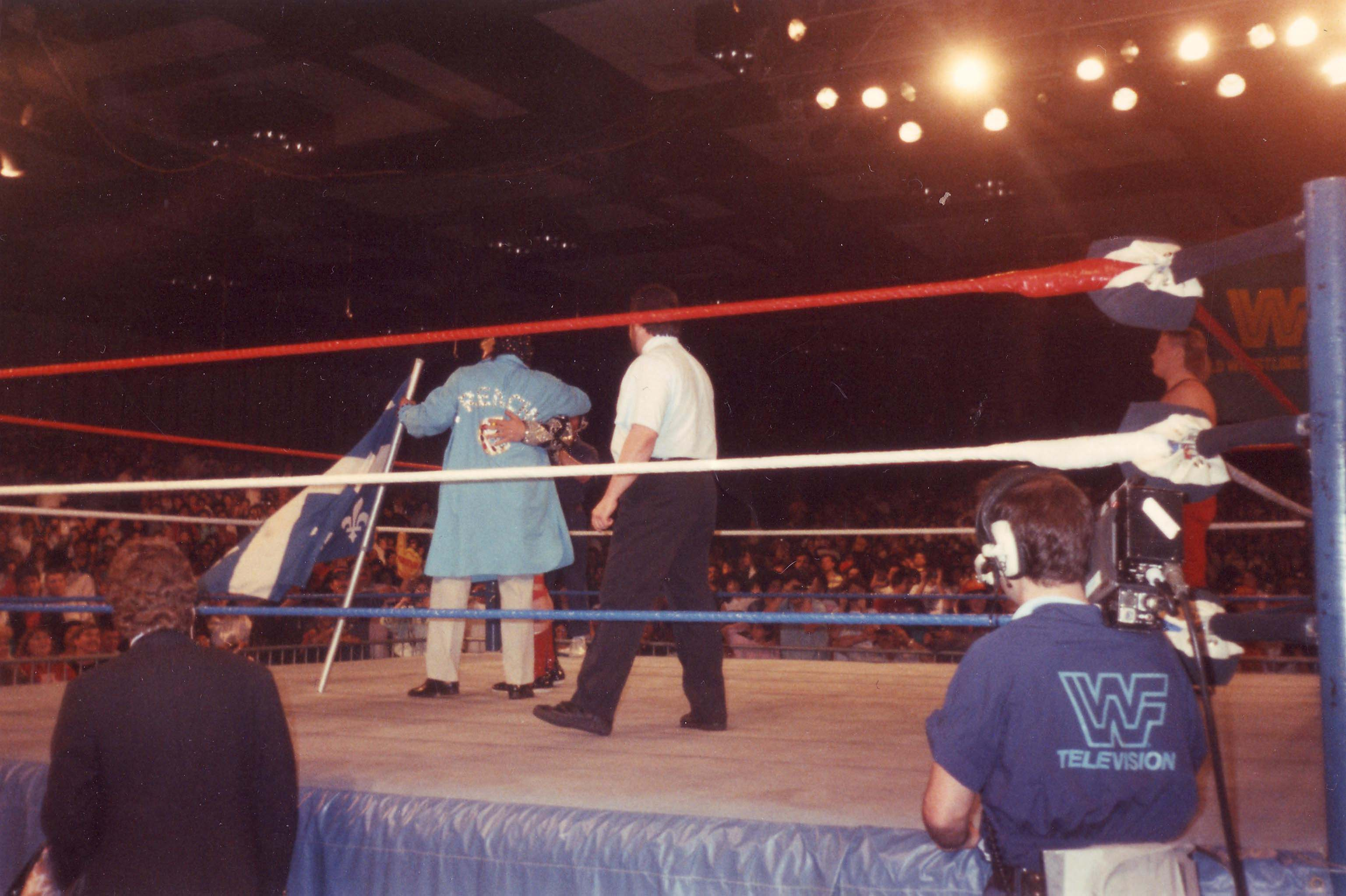
- Martin in the World Wrestling Federation in March 1989 seen hugging client Dino Bravo

Personal information
- Born: Jean Gagné; July 19, 1947 Quebec City, Quebec, Canada
- Died: October 21, 2016 (aged 69) Quebec City, Quebec, Canada
- Children: 2

Professional wrestling career
- Ring name(s): Don Gagné; Frenchy Martin; Pierre Martel; Pierre Martin; Pierre Vigneault; Mad Dog Martin
- Billed height: 6 ft 2 in (1.88 m)
- Billed weight: 253 lb (115 kg)
- Billed from: Quebec City, Quebec, Canada
- Debut: 1971
- Retired: 1990

Jean Gagné (July 19, 1947 – October 21, 2016), better known by his ring name Frenchy Martin, was a Canadian professional wrestler and manager. During his World Wrestling Federation (WWF) heyday in the 1980s as the manager of Canadian wrestler Dino Bravo, he was known for his trademark sign that read "USA is not OK". He is also known for his work in Canada’s Stampede Wrestling and in Puerto Rico's World Wrestling Council (WWC).

== Professional wrestling career ==
=== Canada and Puerto Rico (1971–1986) ===
Jean Gagné began his career in 1971 in Quebec and in Stu Hart's Stampede Wrestling. In June 1977, Gagné, under the name Frenchy Martin, won the IW North American Heavyweight Championship in Trans-Canada Wrestling. In July, he lost the title to Leo Burke. In Stampede Wrestling in February 1976, he held the Stampede Wrestling International Tag Team Championship under the name Don Gagné. In October 1977, Gagné, still wrestling under the name Don Gagné, won the Stampede North American Heavyweight Championship in a tournament final after the former champion Dan Kroffat retired and vacated the title. In January, however, he lost the title to old rival Leo Burke. Gagné defeated Burke for the Stampede Championship in November 1979 but lost it to Mr. Sekigawa in December.

In November and December 1975, Gagné and Mad Dog Martel (billed as "Combat") wrestled in Japan for the International Wrestling Enterprise promotion as part of its Big Winter Series. In their second bout, they defeated Great Kusatsu and Mighty Inoue in a two-out-of-three falls match to win the IWA World Tag Team Championship. Kusatsu and Inoue regained the titles from Combat the following month in a cage match. Combat made a second tour with International Wrestling Enterprise in October to December 1976 as part of its Bravery Series.

Meanwhile, Jean Gagné also wrestled in Puerto Rico's World Wrestling Council under his own name, and in the first half of 1978, he and partner Huracán Castillo traded the WWC World Tag Team Championship with the tag team of Invader I and José Rivera, holding the title once. He also held the WWC Caribbean Heavyweight Championship and the WWC North American Tag Team Championship, the latter he held four times; one of the times was with Michel Martel as part of a tag team called the Mercenaries. While in Puerto Rico, he wrestled Ric Flair in a match to a 60-minute time limit draw. Gagné also wrestled under the name Mad Dog Martin in Australasia and the South Pacific during the mid to-late 1970s. On September 28, 1978, he won the NWA British Empire/Commonwealth Championship from Steve Rickard and defended the title for several months before dropping it to Leo Burke the following year.

In 1980, under the name Masked Cyclops, Gagné won the NWA Pacific International Championship from Tor Kamata, but he lost it later that year to Siva Afi. In Montreal's Lutte Internationale in January 1984, Gagné won the Canadian International Tag Team Championship with partner Pierre Lefebvre from the team of Gino Brito and Tony Parisi, but lost them in a rematch on February 20. In June, Gagné and Lefebvre won the title back, but lost it to Raymond Rougeau and Jacques Rougeau Jr. in the beginning of July.

=== World Wrestling Federation (1986–1990) ===
Martin debuted in the WWF in October 1986. Initially a full-time wrestler, he would primarily be used as an enhancement talent, losing the majority of his matches. In August 1987, he began to be the host of a WWF's skit "Le Studio" (presented only in Canada, during Superstars of Wrestling); during the segment, he would interview his guests and translate their answers in French, using the opportunity to mock the faces and praise the heels. Since he spoke fluent Spanish from his years in Puerto Rico, he hosted a similar segment for WWF's Spanish-language TV called "Frenchy's Easel." Throughout 1987, he would make regular appearances as color commentator on the French-language WWF programming alongside Edouard Carpentier and Guy Hauray. Martin began managing Dino Bravo in late 1987. During his alliance with Bravo, Martin regularly carried a sign down to ringside that read "USA is not OK". In March 1988, he managed Bravo at WrestleMania IV in a match against Don Muraco. During a rematch at SummerSlam in August, Martin distracted Bravo's opponent Muraco to allow Bravo to get the victory. In October at the King of the Ring, Martin managed Bravo in a loss over Jim Duggan in a flag match. He also appeared at Bravo's side at Saturday Night's Main Event XVII at the end of October for Bravo's match against Ken Patera. On Thanksgiving night, he also appeared at Survivor Series.

Martin also managed Jos LeDuc in 1988, but LeDuc's run in the WWF was short and he made very few appearances on television. At the Royal Rumble in January 1989, Bravo, accompanied by Martin, teamed with The Fabulous Rougeaus (Jacques and Raymond), but lost a two out of three falls match against Jim Duggan and The Hart Foundation (Bret Hart and Jim Neidhart). At WrestleMania V in April 1989, after Bravo's match with Ron Garvin, Martin attacked Garvin, and as a result, Garvin performed his signature maneuver, the "Garvin Stomp" on him. Bravo replaced Martin in favor of Jimmy Hart in April 1989.

Later, Martin appeared as an occasional enhancement talent on weekly WWF television broadcasts, reviving his initial role with the company when he joined the WWF in 1986. His return as a wrestler came on January 5, 1990 at a house show in Des Moines, Iowa where he faced Tito Santana. He would wrestle a variety of opponents, including Tugboat, Paul Roma, Jim Powers, Mark Young, Koko B. Ware, Jim Brunzell, and others. On May 4 he defeated Rico Frederico in Tampa, FL, and his final match came on May 11, 1990 in Long Island, NY where he faced Paul Roma, after which Gagné retired from wrestling.

=== Later years (1990–2016) ===
After leaving the WWF, Martin eventually became head booker for the IWA in Puerto Rico. At the International Wrestling 2000 card at the Centre Pierre Charbonneau, Gagné as Frenchy Martin managed Richard Charland in the semi-main event against King Kong Bundy. Until his death he continued to make guest appearances for indie shows across Canada and the US.

== Personal life and death ==
Gagne spoke fluent French, English, and Spanish. He has a son and a nephew who have wrestled, Jean Gagne Jr. and George Martel. He also has a daughter.

On September 8, 2016, Smith Hart announced that Gagne was afflicted with bladder cancer and had been moved to hospice care, and on October 21, 2016, Gagne died after nearly a year of bladder and bone cancer; he was 69 years old.

== Championships and accomplishments ==
- 50th State Big Time Wrestling
  - NWA Pacific International Championship (1 time)
- Atlantic Grand Prix Wrestling
  - AGPW International Heavyweight Championship (2 times)
- International Wrestling Enterprise
  - IWA World Tag Team Championship (1 time) - with Mad Dog Martel
- Lutte Internationale
  - Canadian International Tag Team Championship (2 times) - with Pierre Lefebvre
- NWA New Zealand
  - NWA British Empire/Commonwealth Championship (New Zealand version) (1 time)
- Trans-Canada Wrestling
  - IW North American Heavyweight Championship (1 time)
- Stampede Wrestling
  - NWA International Tag Team Championship (Calgary version) (1 time) - with Ripper Collins
  - Stampede North American Heavyweight Championship (2 times)
- World Wrestling Council
  - WWC Caribbean Heavyweight Championship (2 times)
  - WWC North American Heavyweight Championship (3 times)
  - WWC North American Tag Team Championship (4 times) - with Michel Martel (1 time), Rick Martel (2 times) and Mr. Fuji (1 time)
  - WWC World Tag Team Championship (4 times) - with Huracán Castillo (1 time), Invader I (1 time), Gino de la Serra (1 time) and Gran Apolo (1 time)
