= George Gordienko =

Canadian professional wrestler and artist (1928–2002)

Personal information
- Born: January 7, 1928 Winnipeg, Manitoba, Canada
- Died: May 13, 2002 (aged 74) Campbell River, British Columbia, Canada

Professional wrestling career
- Ring name: George Gordienko
- Billed height: 5 ft 11 in (180 cm)
- Billed weight: 260 lb (120 kg; 19 st)
- Trained by: Joe Pazandak; Stu Hart
- Debut: 1946
- Retired: 1976

George Gordienko (January 7, 1928 – May 13, 2002) was a Canadian professional wrestler and artist. Born of first generation Ukrainian and Cossack-Canadian parents in North Winnipeg, Manitoba, by age 17 Gordienko had received numerous awards for his physical prowess. He wrestled from 1946 to 1976 and was, according to Lou Thesz and other experts, one of the top legitimate wrestlers in the world. He was rated the best heavyweight wrestler in the UK in 1963, and in 1970, won the annual Royal Albert Hall tournament in London. After his retirement he became a successful artist.

== Professional wrestling career ==
He wrestled professionally from 1946 to 1976. He started as a weightlifter as a teenager. Joe Pazandak was his training partner in wrestling early in his career and Tony Stecher of Minneapolis was his manager in the very beginning. He mostly wrestled as Stu Hart's tag team partner after returning to wrestling in 1953. He fought Lou Thesz for the National Wrestling Alliance (NWA)'s NWA World Heavyweight Championship in 1953 in Canada and wrestled Thesz again to a 90-minute draw in Edmonton in 1955.

George Gordienko won the Alberta Golden Jubilee tournament in 1955, defeating Adrien Baillargeon in the final. He then settled in UK. He was ranked the top heavyweight wrestler in the Great Britain in 1963. In 1970, George won the annual Royal Albert Hall tournament in London. He then triumphed in winning the British Commonwealth heavyweight title. He also won New Zealand's version of the British Commonwealth Heavyweight Championship in 1968. The majority of Gordienko's title wins took place in Western Canada, as he won several NWA titles in British Columbia and Alberta. Competing in Calgary in 1956, he won the city's version of the NWA Canadian Heavyweight Championship. In 1974, he competed in British Columbia and won Vancouver's version of the NWA Pacific Coast Heavyweight Championship and the NWA Canadian Tag Team Championship. He also competed for Stampede Wrestling, where he won the promotion's International Tag Team Championship and was later inducted into the company's hall of fame.

George Gordienko wrestled all over the world, including the Middle East, Australia, India, and South Africa. He competed under a variety of ring names, including Firpo Zyzbsko in India and Flash Gordon in British Columbia. He retired in 1976 at age forty-eight after having his ankle broken by Roland Bock in Germany.

== Personal life ==
Born in Winnipeg, Manitoba, in 1928, Gordienko moved to the United States to pursue studies to enter a medical career. He was briefly associated with a communist party. He was arrested for distributing communist literature, which caused him to be deported and sent back to Canada. He retired in Campbell River, British Columbia.

Before his retirement, Gordienko became an artist. His favorite artist was Pablo Picasso, and he met Picasso at one point. From 1976 to 1990, he lived in Italy with a Greek woman named Christina Tassou. Gordienko died of melanoma in 2002.

== Championships and accomplishments ==
- Cauliflower Alley Club
  - Posthumous Award (2009)
- George Tragos/Lou Thesz Professional Wrestling Hall of Fame
  - Class of 2010
- Fédération Française de Catch Professionnel
  - World Heavyweight Championship (French version) (1 time)
- Joint Promotions
  - British Commonwealth Heavyweight Championship (1 time)
- NWA All-Star Wrestling
  - NWA Canadian Tag Team Championship (Vancouver version) (1 time) – with Leo Madril
  - NWA Pacific Coast Heavyweight Championship (Vancouver version) (1 time)
- NWA New Zealand
  - British Commonwealth Heavyweight Championship (New Zealand version) (1 time)
- Professional Wrestling Hall of Fame
  - Class of 2012
- Stampede Wrestling
  - NWA Canadian Heavyweight Championship (Calgary version) (1 time)
  - NWA International Tag Team Championship (Calgary version) (1 time) – with Super Hawk
  - Stampede Wrestling Hall of Fame (Class of 1995)
- Wrestling Observer Newsletter
  - Wrestling Observer Newsletter Hall of Fame (Class 2026)
