= Pete Sanchez =

American professional wrestler (1943–2024)

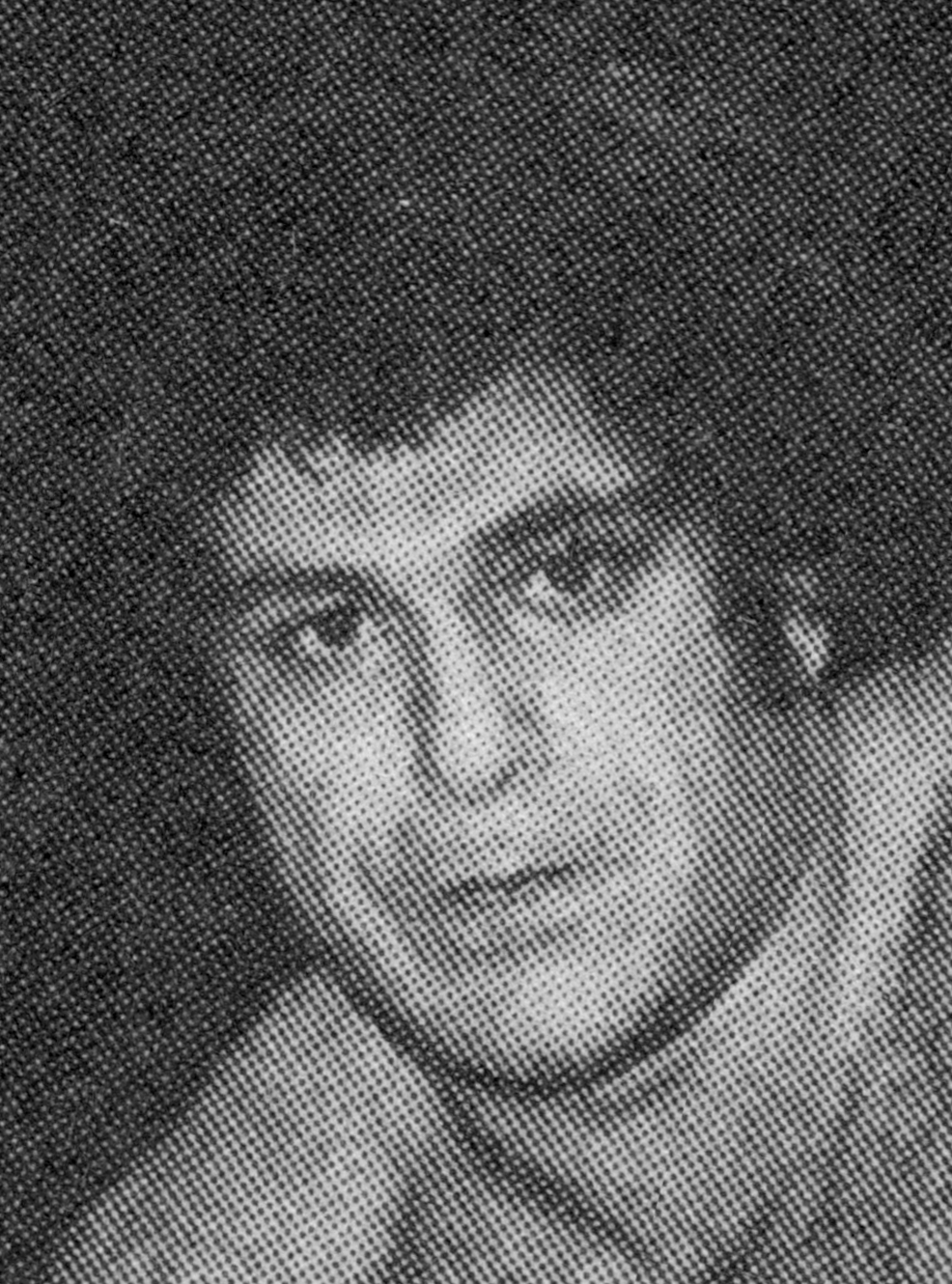

Personal information
- Born: Peter Sanchez; April 4, 1943 New York City, New York, U.S.
- Died: July 27, 2024 (aged 81) Freehold Township, New Jersey, US

Professional wrestling career
- Ring name(s): Pete Sanchez ‘Pistol’ Pete Sanchez; Pete Caruso; Gino Caruso
- Billed height: 5 ft 11 in (180 cm)
- Billed weight: 238
- Billed from: Puerto Rico
- Debut: 1958
- Retired: 1995

Peter Sanchez (April 4, 1943 – July 27, 2024) was an American professional wrestler of Puerto Rican origin who worked for the World Wide Wrestling Federation/World Wrestling Federation from 1963 to 1992 as a jobber. He also wrestled as Gino Caruso in various territories.

== Professional wrestling career ==
Sanchez made his professional wrestling debut in 1958 in New York City for Capitol Wrestling Corporation. In January 1963, the Capitol Wrestling Corporation branched off from the National Wrestling Alliance and Capitol changed its name to the World Wide Wrestling Federation.

In 1970, Sanchez worked in other territories in the States and Canada as Gino Caruso. In 1973, Sanchez won the Stampede International Tag Team Championship in Calgary with Bill Cody.

In 1983, Sanchez wrestled in Puerto Rico for the World Wrestling Council.

Throughout the 1970s and 1980s Sanchez continued working for World Wide Wrestling Federation which changed its name to the World Wrestling Federation in 1979. Sanchez worked for the American Wrestling Association from 1985 to its closure in 1990. Also in 1990, Sanchez worked a few matches for World Championship Wrestling.

Sanchez wrestled his last match for the World Wrestling Federation on February 17, 1992, aired on March 21 for WWF Superstars losing to Tatanka in Tampa, Florida.

He wrestled his last match in 1995 in an independent promotion in Wisconsin. Once retired from wrestling he joined the Newspaper and Mail Deliverers Union.

== Personal life and death ==
On July 27, 2024, Bill Apter and Davey O'Hannon announced that Pete Sanchez had died that same day following a battle with cancer. He was 81.

== Championships and accomplishments ==
- Midwest Wrestling Association
  - NWA United States Tag Team Championship (Ohio version) - with Carlos Milano
- Stampede Wrestling
  - NWA International Tag Team Championship (Calgary version) (2 times) – with Bill Cody
- Western States Sports
  - NWA Western States Tag Team Championship (2 times) – with Gary Young
- World Wrestling Council
  - WWC North American Tag Team Championship (1 time) – with Carlos Colón
