= Earl Black (wrestler) =

Australian professional wrestler

Personal information
- Born: Frank Earl Black; 29 July 1943 (age 82) Sydney, New South Wales, Australia

Professional wrestling career
- Ring name(s): Mr. X Mr. Tiger; Blackjack Black
- Billed height: 6 ft 2 in (188 cm)
- Billed weight: 245 lb (111 kg)
- Trained by: Steve Rickard; Joe Komene
- Debut: 1966
- Retired: 1972

Frank Earl Black (born 29 July 1943) is a retired Australian professional wrestler who wrestled under the name Earl Black.

== Personal life ==
Black has a son who is also professional wrestler known as Earl Black Jr.

== Championships and accomplishments ==
- NWA Australia
  - Australian Heavyweight Championship (1 time)
- Stampede Wrestling
  - NWA International Tag Team Championship (Calgary version) (2 times) – with Tiger Joe Tomasso
- Other titles
  - Far East Championship Tournament (1969)
