= Stampede Wrestling =

Canadian professional wrestling company

- Acronym: Stampede Wrestling
- Founded: September 11, 1948 (first run); October 28, 1985 (second run); April 2, 1999 (third run)
- Defunct: November 5, 1984 (first run); December 18, 1989 (second run); April 26, 2008 (third run)
- Headquarters: Calgary, Alberta
- Founder(s): Stu Hart; Al Oeming
- Owner(s): Al Oeming (1948–1959); Stu Hart (1948–1984); Vince McMahon (1984–1985); Bruce Hart (1985–1989); Bruce and Ross Hart (1999–2007); Bill Bell (2007–2008); Smith Hart
- Parent: National Wrestling Alliance (until 1982); World Wrestling Federation (1984–1985); WWE Legacy Department (WWE)
- Formerly: Klondike Wrestling; Big Time Wrestling; Wildcat Wrestling

Stampede Wrestling was a Canadian professional wrestling promotion based in Calgary, Alberta. For nearly 50 years, it was one of the main promotions in western Canada and the Canadian Prairies. Established by Stu Hart in 1948, the promotion competed with other promotions such as NWA All-Star Wrestling and Pacific Northwest Wrestling and regularly ran events in Calgary's Victoria Pavilion, Ogden Auditorium and the Stampede Corral.

In 1984, it was bought out by promoter Vince McMahon. The company was briefly run by the World Wrestling Federation (WWF, now WWE) before being sold back to the Hart family in 1985. Run by Bruce Hart until January 1990, he and Ross Hart reopened the promotion in 1999 and began running events in the Alberta area.

Along with its wrestling school known as "The Dungeon", many of the promotion's alumni became some of the most popular stars in the World Wrestling Federation and other American promotions in the 1980s and 1990s. The promotion produced one of the earliest televised professional wrestling programs, considered the forerunner of WWE’s Raw and SmackDown, that remained one of Calgary's most popular sports programs, eventually airing in over 50 countries.

== History ==
=== First run (1948–1984) ===
Stampede Wrestling was formed in 1948 by Stu Hart and Al Oeming under the name Klondike Wrestling, and held their first show on September 11, 1948, at the Sales Pavillion in Edmonton, Alberta. It also become the National Wrestling Alliance's Calgary territory in Canada. In May 1951, they changed its name to Big Time Wrestling. In February 1958, they introduced their version of the NWA International Tag Team Championship to replace the Alberta Tag Team Championship that was retired the year before, which was won by The Kalmikoffs.

In 1959, Oeming retired and Hart took full control of the territory. Hart retired their version of the NWA Canadian Tag Team Championship. In 1965, he changed the name of the promotion to Wildcat Wrestling. In August 1967, he changed it to Stampede Wrestling, and the name stuck. In February 1968, they created their own singles title, the Stampede North American Heavyweight Championship, which was won by Archie Gouldie, the future Mongolian Stomper.

In 1972, they retired their version of the NWA Canadian Heavyweight Championship. In June 1978, they introduced the Stampede British Commonwealth Mid-Heavyweight Championship, with Dynamite Kid as their inaugural champion during his first tour in North America. In 1979, Stampede brought back an old championship, the Stampede World Mid-Heavyweight Championship (the title was first introduced in June 1959, before being quickly abandoned), with Dick Steinborn as champion. In 1982, Stampede withdrew from the NWA.

On December 2, 1983, a riot broke out at the Victoria Pavilion in Calgary during a match between Bret Hart, Davey Boy Smith and Sonny Two Rivers against Bad News Allen, The Stomper and Stomper's kayfabe son Jeff Gouldie. Longtime Stampede announcer Ed Whalen reportedly became distraught during the riot, in which a woman was trampled, causing him to quit from the Stampede on air. Speaking of the events he remarked, "We're starting to scare the patrons with this violence outside the ring, and I will not be associated with it anymore."

The event led to Stampede Wrestling being banned from Calgary for six months by the city's wrestling and boxing commission. In August 1984, Stampede Wrestling was sold to the World Wrestling Federation.

Of all the talent that WWF took upon their purchase of Stampede, they took only three wrestlers: Bret Hart, Davey Boy Smith, and Dynamite Kid. Their last show was held on November 5, 1984 in Vancouver, British Columbia, as a WWF/Stampede joint show. Bret Hart claims that Vince McMahon never actually paid for the territory, and “stiffed” his father, Stu Hart.

=== Second run (1985–1989) ===
On October 28, 1985, the WWF sold Stampede back to the Hart family, with Bruce Hart taking the reins. In 1986, the Calgary territory was given a shot of adrenaline with new talent such as Owen Hart, Brian Pillman, Chris Benoit, Biff Wellington, and Johnny Smith coming in to tangle with Gama Singh and his Karachi Vice stable (which included Shinya Hashimoto, Gary Albright, and Mike Shaw) and The Viet Cong Express (which included a masked Hiroshi Hase).

In December 1987, they added a women's championship, the IWA World Women's Championship, with Monster Ripper as their champion. In January 1989, that championship moved to Japan.

Despite a valiant four years trying to resurrect the wrestling scene in Calgary to its former glory, Stampede officially shut down on December 18, 1989. The closure stemmed from long-standing problems between Bruce Hart and Ed Whalen, producer Fred May's constantly editing too much content off TV, and pay disputes within talent. Their final show before closing down was held in Edmonton on December 16, with Larry Cameron defeating Bob Emory in the main event to retain the North American Heavyweight Championship.

=== Failed attempts to relaunch ===
Despite Stampede officially closing down in December 1989, there were several attempts to revive the promotion. The first attempt occurred around March 1990 by Bruce Hart, but it only lasted three months, running smaller towns outside Calgary and Edmonton, due to a lack of approval by the Calgary Wrestling & Boxing Commission to promote shows. The next attempt was around December 1991 by Abu Wizal, but only lasted a couple of weeks. Between July 1995 and July 1997, Bruce Hart promoted one-off shows periodically at the Rockyford Rodeo in Rockyford, Alberta.

On December 15, 1995, a special Stampede Wrestling tribute show was held at the Corral in Calgary, celebrating Stu Hart's life and career. It featured several Stampede alumni, as well as talent from both the World Wrestling Federation and World Championship Wrestling. The main event saw Bret Hart successfully defend the WWF Championship against Davey Boy Smith.

=== Third run (1999–2008) ===
In early 1999, Bruce and Ross Hart reopened Stampede Wrestling, showcasing graduates from the Hart Dungeon training school. Only weeks after their first event, the promotion once again became inactive following the death of Owen Hart in May. Although considering closing the promotion, the Hart family continued to promote events five months later and began touring western Canada. Although successful, the Harts were forced to cancel several tours in late 2001 and early 2002 due to the arrival of a rival promotion backed by a Calgary businessman. The promotion also lost much of its roster due to its rival hiring away top stars.

In 2005, promoters Bill Bell and Devon Nicholson took over day-to-day operations for Stampede Wrestling. During an event at the Spray Lakes Sawmill Sportsplex in Cochrane, Alberta, Nicholson would face Abdullah the Butcher after the scheduled main event between Lance Storm and Rhyno was canceled when Rhyno failed to appear. At that same event, longtime tag team partners TJ Wilson and Harry Smith faced each other in Smith's final match for the promotion before leaving for World Wrestling Entertainment. Bruce and Ross Hart sold Stampede Wrestling to Bill Bell in 2007. The promotion ceased operations again in April 2008.

Stampede's weekly shows were held mostly at the Victoria Pavilion in Calgary, with special events held at the Stampede Corral.

== Television program ==
Stampede Wrestling was the basis for a long-running weekly sports broadcast produced in Calgary showcasing many of the promotion's most popular wrestlers. Hosted by Ed Whalen most of its run, which went from 1957 to 1989, the series was syndicated around the world and reruns continue to be shown in some countries to this day. At the time Stampede was revived in 1999, a second Stampede Wrestling TV series was attempted, hosted by Bad News Allen and play by play commentator Mauro Ranallo, but it was short-lived and Whalen was not involved.

== Tape library ==
WWE currently controls Stampede's extensive tape library. In December 2015, the WWE Network began adding Stampede Wrestling shows to its Vault section. However, it was all removed a few days later, after Bret Hart proved that he owned the rights to the footage of his matches.

== The Dungeon ==
Stampede Wrestling was famous for "The Dungeon", a professional wrestling school located in the basement of the Calgary mansion Hart House, home of the Hart family. Stu Hart and Mr. Hito were the main trainers in the Dungeon. The school trained a number of ECW, WCW, WWE and NJPW stars, including the Hart Brothers, Mark Henry, Chris Benoit, Chris Jericho, Ricky Fuji, Hiroshi Hase, Ken Shamrock, Justin Credible, Christian and Edge.

== Championships ==
Championship:	Last champion(s):	Active from:	Active until:	Notes:
Alberta Tag Team Championship	John Foti and John Paul Henning	1954	1957	
British Commonwealth Mid-Heavyweight Championship	Gama Singh Jr.	July 1978	April 2008	The British Commonwealth Mid-Heavyweight title was revived in 1999 when Stampede started promoting again Karl Anderson won it on March 12, 2006 in Santa Monica, California.
IWA World Women's Championship	Kyoko Inoue	December 1987	1997	In 1989 the title began being promoted by All Japan Women's Pro-Wrestling
NWA Canadian Heavyweight Championship (Calgary version)	Dave Ruhl	November 1, 1946	1972	
NWA Canadian Tag Team Championship (Calgary version)	Butcher Vachon and Mad Dog Vachon	1954	1959	Tag Team title replaced by the NWA International Tag-Team Championship (Calgary version) later known as the “Stampede International Tag Team Championship”
Stampede International Tag Team Championship	JR Wapass and Calvin Wapass	1984	April 1984	
Stampede North American Heavyweight Championship	Ravenous Randy	February 28, 1968	April 2008	The North American title was revived in 1998 when Stampede started promoting again
Stampede Pacific Heavyweight Championship	Michael Modest	May 1999	June 27, 2001	
Stampede Women's Pacific Championship	Belle Lovitz	June 15, 2005	April 2008	The Women’s Pacific Title is the only title that was not used in the original version of Stampede Wrestling
Stampede World Mid-Heavyweight Championship	Bob Gordon	1984	c. October 1985	

== Former personnel ==
=== Modern version (1999–2008) ===
Male wrestlers

Ring name	Real name	Tenure	Notes
Alex Plexis	Unknown	2005–2008	
Apocalypse	Eric Thompson	2000–2008	
Bob Flying Gordon	Bob Gordon	1984–1989	
Brady Roberts	Brady Roberts	2005–2008	
Brandon Van Danielson	Unknown	2005–2008	
Bruce Hart	Bruce Hart (wrestler)	1999–2003	
Carlo Cannon	Unknown	2005	
Allan Mark	Unknown	2004–2019	
Chris Steele	Unknown	2000, 2002, 2004, 2006–2008	
Chucky Blaze	Michael Richard Blais	2005–2008	
Crosse	Deryck Barton	2006–2008	
Duke Durango	Jordan Clarke	2003–2006	
Dusty Adonis	Unknown	2005–2008	
Eddie Mustang	Unknown	1999–2005	
Gama Singh Jr.	Unknown	2004–2008	
Greg Pawluk	Greg Pawluk	1999–2000, 2003–2004	
Harry Smith	Harry Smith	1999–2006	
Jimmy T	Unknown	1999–2000, 2007–2008	
Johnny Devine	John Parsonage	1999–2000, 2002–2006, 2008	
Juggernaut	Craig Renney	2002–2003, 2006–2007	
Calvin wrapass	Unknown	1984–1987	
Kirk Melnick	Unknown	2000–2004, 2007	
Lance Storm	Lance Evers	2001	
Marky Mark	Unknown	2003–2008	
Matt Richards	Unknown	2004–2006	
Jr wrapass	Unknown	1984–1987	
Mike Modest	Michael Ciriglio	2001	
Neil Faith	Neil Horsfall	2002	
Pete Wilson	Peter Minnema	2003–2008	
Randy Myers	Theo Francon	2001–2008	
Retch Worthington	Unknown	2007–2008	
Richard Pound	John Cozman	1999–2001, 2003–2004	
Scotty Putty	Unknown	2007–2008	
Superfly Dan	Unknown	2002–2008	
Tatanka	Chris Chavis	1999	
tom mark	Unknown	2004–2013	
Teddy Hart	Edward Annis	1999–2006, 2008	
Thomas E Wolf	Shane Diederich	1999-2002	
Tiger Raj Singh	Yuvraj Raj Dhesi	2004–2008	
Tiger Kahn	Marlon Kalkai	1999–2001	
T.J. Wilson	Theodore James Wilson	1999–2007	

Female wrestlers

Ring name	Real name	Tenure	Notes
Anna Marie	Unknown	2004–2005	
Belle Lovitz	Unknown	2002–2008	
Bob Gordon	Unknown	2007–2012	
Natalya Neidhart	Natalie Neidhart	2002–2007	
Phoenix Taylor	Unknown	2003–2005, 2007–2008	

=== Original version (1948–2007) ===
- Adrian Street^{†}
- Abdullah the Butcher
- Bad News Allen^{†}
- Hercules Ayala^{†}
- Ben Bassarab
- Chris Benoit^{†}
- Black Tomcat
- Steve Blackman
- "Bulldog" Bob Brown^{†}
- Kerry Brown^{†}
- Leo Burke^{†}
- Larry Cameron^{†}
- Edouard Carpentier^{†}
- The Cobra
- Cuban Assassin
- Steve DiSalvo
- Dory Funk Jr.
- Waldo Von Erich^{†}
- The Great Gama
- Andre The Giant^{†}
- Sumo Hara
- Bret Hart
- Bruce Hart
- Keith Hart
- Owen Hart^{†}
- Smith Hart^{†}
- Stu Hart^{†}
- Teddy Hart
- Wayne Hart
- Mr. Hito^{†}
- Honky Tonk Wayne
- Hiroshi Hase
- Lance Idol
- Jason the Terrible
- Hashif Khan^{†}
- Killer Khan^{†}
- Dynamite Kid^{†}
- Tyson Kidd
- Killer Kowalski^{†}
- Dan Kroffat
- Phil Lafon
- Jos Leduc^{†}
- Paul Leduc
- Keiichi Yamada
- Michel Martel^{†}
- Rick Martel
- Frenchy Martin^{†}
- Eddie Morrow
- Gerry Morrow
- Angelo Mosca^{†}
- Don Muraco
- Duke Myers^{†}
- Kendo Nagasaki (Peter Thornley)
- Jim "The Anvil" Neidhart^{†}
- Nattie Neidhart
- Brian Pillman^{†}
- Gilles Poisson
- Harley Race^{†}
- Ron Ritchie
- Big Daddy Ritter^{†}
- Jake Roberts
- Billy Robinson^{†}
- Goldie Rogers^{†}
- Jacques Rougeau
- Mr. Sakurada^{†}
- Wild Samoans^{†}
- Benkei Sasaki
- Satoru Sayama
- The Sheepherders
- "Dr. D." David Schultz
- Rhonda Sing^{†}
- Makhan Singh^{†}
- Vokhan Singh^{†}
- Davey Boy Smith^{†}
- Harry Smith
- Johnny Smith
- Stan Stasiak^{†}
- The Stomper^{†}
- Terrible Ted, a black bear^{†}
- Les Thornton^{†}
- Maurice Vachon^{†}
- Paul Vachon^{†}
- Biff Wellington^{†}
- George Wells
- Ed Whalen^{†}

== Hall of Fame ==
The Stampede Wrestling Hall of Fame list professional wrestlers and others who have competed in Stampede Wrestling, from Stu Hart's Klondike Wrestling to the original Stampede Wrestling promotion which closed in 1990.

#	Year	Ring name (Real name)^{[a]}	Inducted by	Inducted for	Notes^{[b]}
1	1995	Stu Hart	N/A	Wrestling and Promoting	Founder of Stampede Wrestling
2	1995	Jack Taylor	N/A	Wrestling	
3	1995	Al "Mr. Murder" Mills (Adolph Mittlestadt)	N/A	Wrestling	
4	1995	Lou Thesz (Aloysius Thesz)	N/A	Wrestling	
5	1995	Jim "Riot Call" Wright (James Wright)	N/A	Wrestling	
6	1995	Rube Wright (Reuben Wright)	N/A	Wrestling	
7	1995	Pat McGill (Patrick McGill)	N/A	Wrestling	
8	1995	Sky Hi Lee (Robert Leedy)	N/A	Wrestling	Won the NWA Canadian Heavyweight Championship (2 times) and Alberta Tag Team Championship (2 times)
9	1995	Luther Lindsay (Luther Goodall)	N/A	Wrestling	Won the NWA Canadian Heavyweight Championship (Calgary version) (1 time), NWA Canadian Tag Team Championship (Calgary version) (1 time) and NWA International Tag Team Championship (Calgary version) (1 time)
10	1995	Dr. Bill Miller (William Miller)	N/A	Wrestling	
11	1995	Whipper Billy Watson (William Potts)	N/A	Wrestling	Won the NWA Canadian Heavyweight Championship (Calgary version) (1 time)
12	1995	Chief Thunderbird (Jean Baptiste Paul)	N/A	Wrestling	
13	1995	Earl McCready	N/A	Wrestling	Won the Alberta Tag Team Championship (1 time)
14	1995	Pat O'Connor (Patrick O'Connor)	N/A	Wrestling	
15	1995	Ilio DiPaolo	N/A	Wrestling	Won the NWA Canadian Tag Team Championship (Calgary version) (1 time)
16	1995	Édouard Carpentier (Édouard Weiczorkiewicz])	N/A	Wrestling	
17	1995	Gorgeous George (George Wagner)	N/A	Wrestling	
18	1995	Argentina Rocca (Antonino Biasetton)	N/A	Wrestling	
19	1995	Killer Kowalski (Edward Spulnik)	N/A	Wrestling	Won the NWA Canadian Heavyweight Championship (Calgary version) (2 times) and Stampede Wrestling International Tag Team Championship (Calgary version) (2 times)
20	1995	Czaya Nandor	N/A	Wrestling	Won the NWA Canadian Heavyweight Championship (Calgary version) (3 times) and Stampede Wrestling International Tag Team Championship (1 time)
21	1995	Waldo Von Erich (Walter Sieber)	N/A	Wrestling	Won the NWA Canadian Heavyweight Championship (Calgary version) (1 time) and Stampede Wrestling North American Championship (1 time)
22	1995	Tex McKenzie (Frank McKenzie)	N/A	Wrestling	Won the NWA Canadian Tag Team Championship (Calgary version) (1 time)
23	1995	Johnny Valentine (John Wisniski)	N/A	Wrestling	Won the NWA Canadian Heavyweight Championship (Calgary version) (2 times)
24	1995	"Crusher" Stan Stasiak (George Stipich)	N/A	Wrestling	Won the NWA Canadian Heavyweight Championship (Calgary version) (3 times) and Stampede North American Heavyweight Championship (1 time)
25	1995	Don Leo Jonathan (Don Heaton)	N/A	Wrestling	Won the NWA Canadian Heavyweight Championship (Calgary version) (2 times)
26	1995	George Gordienko	N/A	Wrestling	Won the NWA Canadian Heavyweight Championship (Calgary version) (1 time) and NWA International Tag Team Championship (Calgary version) (1 time)
27	1995	Archie Gouldie	N/A	Wrestling	Won the Stampede North American Heavyweight Championship (14 times)
28	1995	Dave Ruhl	N/A	Wrestling	Won the NWA Canadian Heavyweight Championship (Calgary version) (8 times), Stampede North American Heavyweight Championship (2 times) and NWA International Tag Team Championship (Calgary version) (1 time)
29	1995	Tiger Joe Tomasso (Joseph DiTommaso)	N/A	Wrestling	Won the Stampede Wrestling International Tag Team Championship (4 times)
30	1995	Angelo Mosca	N/A	Wrestling	Won the Stampede North American Heavyweight Championship (2 times)
31	1995	Billy Robinson (William Robinson)	N/A	Wrestling	
32	1995	Geoff Portz	N/A	Wrestling	
33	1995	Kendo Nagasaki	N/A	Wrestling	
34	1995	Tor Kamata (McRonald Kamaka)	N/A	Wrestling	Won the Stampede North American Heavyweight Championship (3 times) and NWA International Tag Team Championship (Calgary version) (1 time)
35	1995	Les Thornton	N/A	Wrestling	Won the Stampede North American Heavyweight Championship (2 times) and Stampede British Commonwealth Mid-Heavyweight Championship (1 time)
36	1995	Dan Kroffat (Daniel Kroffat)	N/A	Wrestling	Won the Stampede North American Heavyweight Championship (6 times) and NWA International Tag Team Championship (Calgary version) (4 times)
37	1995	Mr. Hito (Katsuji Adachi)	N/A	Wrestling	Won the Stampede North American Heavyweight Championship (2 times) and NWA International Tag Team Championship (Calgary version) (8 times)
38	1995	Leo Burke (Leonce Cormier)	N/A	Wrestling	Won the Stampede North American Heavyweight Championship (8 times) and Stampede Wrestling International Tag Team Championship (6 times)
39	1995	Dory Funk Jr.	N/A	Wrestling	Won the NWA International Tag Team Championship (Calgary version) (1 time)
40	1995	Terry Funk	N/A	Wrestling	
41	1995	Harley Race	N/A	Wrestling	Won the Stampede North American Heavyweight Championship (1 time)
42	1995	André the Giant (André Roussimoff)	N/A	Wrestling	
43	1995	Sky Low Low (Marcel Gauthier)	N/A	Midget Wrestling	
44	1995	Little Beaver (Lionel Giroux)	N/A	Midget Wrestling	
45	1995	The Fabulous Moolah (Mary Ellison)	N/A	Women's Wrestling	
46	1995	Penny Banner (Mary Ann Kostecki)	N/A	Women's Wrestling	
47	1995	Alexander Scott	N/A	Refereeing	
48	1995	Cedrick Hathaway	N/A	Refereeing	
49	1995	J.R. Foley (John Foley)	N/A	Managing	
50	1995	The Dynamite Kid (Tom Billington)	N/A	Wrestling	Won the Stampede North American Heavyweight Championship (1 time), Stampede World Mid-Heavyweight Championship (4 times), Stampede British Commonwealth Mid-Heavyweight Championship (5 times) and Stampede International Tag Team Championship (6 times)
51	1995	Davey Boy Smith (David Smith)	N/A	Wrestling	Won the Stampede North American Heavyweight Championship (2 times), Stampede World Mid-Heavyweight Championship (1 time), Stampede British Commonwealth Mid-Heavyweight Championship (1 time), Stampede Wrestling International Tag Team Championship (2 times) and NWA Stampede International Tag Team Championship (Calgary version) (2 times)
52	1995	Keith Hart	N/A	Wrestling	Won the Stampede World Mid-Heavyweight Championship (1 time), Stampede British Commonwealth Mid-Heavyweight Championship (2 times), Stampede International Tag Team Championship (1 time) and NWA International Tag Team Championship (Calgary version) (7 times)
53	1995	Bruce Hart	N/A	Wrestling	Won the Stampede North American Heavyweight Championship (2 times), Stampede World Mid-Heavyweight Championship (2 times), Stampede British Commonwealth Mid-Heavyweight Championship (8 times), Stampede International Tag Team Championship (2 times) and NWA International Tag Team Championship (Calgary version) (2 times)
54	1995	Bret Hart	N/A	Wrestling	Won the Stampede North American Heavyweight Championship (6 times), Stampede British Commonwealth Mid-Heavyweight Championship (3 times) and NWA International Tag Team Championship (Calgary version) (5 times)
55	1995	Owen Hart	N/A	Wrestling	Won the Stampede North American Heavyweight Championship (2 times), Stampede British Commonwealth Mid-Heavyweight Championship (1 time) and Stampede Wrestling International Tag Team Championship (1 time)
56	1995	Brian Pillman	N/A	Wrestling	Won the Stampede Wrestling International Tag Team Championship (2 times)
57	1995	Chris Benoit	N/A	Wrestling	Won the Stampede British Commonwealth Mid-Heavyweight Championship (4 times) and Stampede Wrestling International Tag Team Championship (4 times)
58	1995	"Dr. D" David Schultz (David Schultz)	N/A	Wrestling	Won the Stampede North American Heavyweight Championship (3 times)
59	1995	Jim Neidhart (James Neidhart)	N/A	Wrestling	Won the Stampede International Tag Team Championship (2 times)
60	1995	Duke Myers	N/A	Wrestling	Won the Stampede International Tag Team Championship (2 times)
61	1995	Kerry Brown	N/A	Wrestling	Won the Stampede North American Heavyweight Championship (1 time) and Stampede Wrestling International Tag Team Championship (4 times)
62	1995	Hiroshi Hase	N/A	Wrestling	Won the Stampede International Tag Team Championship (1 time)
63	1995	Larry Cameron	N/A	Wrestling	Won the Stampede North American Heavyweight Championship (1 time)
64	1995	Ed Whalen	N/A	Announcing and Commentating	
65	1995	Henry Viney	N/A	Announcing and Commentating	
66	1995	Tom Moore	N/A	Other	Calgary Boxing and Wrestling Commissioner
67	1995	Mike Bulat	N/A	Promoting	
68	1995	Bob Leonard	N/A	Announcing, Photography and Promoting	
69	1995	Ernie Roth	N/A	Announcing and Commentating	
70	1995	Sam Menacker	N/A	Announcing and Commentating	
71	1995	Tyrone McBeth (James Vilvang)	N/A	Other	Appeared as the "onscreen" president of the National Wrestling Alliance

- ^{a} – Entries without a birth name indicates that the inductee did not perform under a ring name.
- ^{b} – This section mainly lists the major accomplishments of each inductee in the Calgary wrestling territory.

== Major events ==
=== 1950s ===
Date	Event	Venue	Location	Main event
July 2, 1955	Stampede Week		Calgary, Alberta	Fritz Von Erich vs. Doug Hepburn
July 9, 1956	Stampede Week	Stampede Corral	Calgary, Alberta	Fritz Von Erich and Karl Von Schoberg vs. Hard Boiled Haggerty and The Mighty Ursus
July 10, 1956	Stampede Week	Stampede Corral	Calgary, Alberta	Billy Watson (c) vs. John Paul Henning for the NWA World Heavyweight Championship
July 8, 1957	Stampede Week	Stampede Corral	Calgary, Alberta	Gene Kiniski (c) vs. Whipper Billy Watson in a Best 2-out-of-3 Falls match for the NWA British Empire Heavyweight Championship
July 9, 1957	Stampede Week	Stampede Corral	Calgary, Alberta	Lou Thesz (c) vs. Whipper Billy Watson for the NWA World Heavyweight Championship
July 7, 1958	Stampede Week	Stampede Corral	Calgary, Alberta	Dick Hutton (c) b. Bill Miller for the NWA World Heavyweight Championship
July 8, 1958	Stampede Week	Stampede Corral	Calgary, Alberta	Dick Hutton (c) b. Billy Watson for the NWA World Heavyweight Championship
July 6, 1959	Stampede Week	Stampede Corral	Calgary, Alberta	Pat O'Connor (c) vs. John Foti for the NWA World Heavyweight Championship
July 7, 1959	Stampede Week	Stampede Corral	Calgary, Alberta	Pat O'Connor (c) vs. Billy Watson for the NWA World Heavyweight Championship
July 11, 1959	Stampede Week	Stampede Corral	Calgary, Alberta	Pat O'Connor (c) vs. Lou Thesz for the NWA World Heavyweight Championship

=== 1960s ===
Date	Event	Venue	Location	Main event
July 11, 1960	Stampede Week	Stampede Corral	Calgary, Alberta	Pat O'Connor (c) vs. Gene Kiniski for the NWA World Heavyweight Championship
July 12, 1960	Stampede Week	Stampede Corral	Calgary, Alberta	Whipper Billy Watson vs. Gene Kiniski
July 10, 1961	Stampede Week	Stampede Corral	Calgary, Alberta	Pat O'Connor (c) vs. Gene Kiniski for the NWA World Heavyweight Championship
July 11, 1961	Stampede Week	Stampede Corral	Calgary, Alberta	Pat O'Connor (c) vs. Whipper Billy Watson for the NWA World Heavyweight Championship
July 6, 1962	Stampede Week		Calgary, Alberta	Ronnie Etchison (c) vs. Gene Kiniski for the NAWA Heavyweight Championship
July 6, 1964	Stampede Week	Stampede Corral	Calgary, Alberta	Killer Kowalski (c) vs. Sweet Daddy Siki in a Best 2-out-of-3 Falls match for the NAWA Heavyweight Championship
July 7, 1964	Stampede Week	Stampede Corral	Calgary, Alberta	
July 10, 1964	Stampede Week	Stampede Corral	Calgary, Alberta	Killer Kowalski (c) vs. Waldo Von Erich for the NAWA Heavyweight Championship
July 5, 1965	Stampede Week	Stampede Corral	Calgary, Alberta	Bruno Sammartino vs. Waldo Von Erich for the WWWF World Heavyweight Championship
July 11, 1967	Stampede Week	Stampede Corral	Calgary, Alberta	Gene Kiniski (c) vs. Stan Stasiak in a Best 2-out-of-3 Falls match for the NWA World Heavyweight Championship
July 8, 1968	Stampede Week	Stampede Corral	Calgary, Alberta	Gene Kiniski (c-NWA) vs. Archie Gouldie (c-SW) in a Best 2-out-of-3 Falls "Champion vs. Champion" match for the NWA World Heavyweight Championship and Stampede Wrestling North American Heavyweight Championship
July 7, 1969	Stampede Week	Victoria Pavilion	Calgary, Alberta	Dory Funk Jr. (c) vs. Billy Robinson for the NWA World Heavyweight Championship

=== 1970s ===
Date	Event	Venue	Location	Main event
July 10, 1970	Stampede Week	Stampede Corral	Calgary, Alberta	Dory Funk Jr. (c) vs. Abdullah the Butcher for the NWA World Heavyweight Championship
July 9, 1971	Stampede Week	Victoria Pavilion	Calgary, Alberta	Dory Funk Jr. (c) vs. Les Thornton for the NWA World Heavyweight Championship
July 7, 1972	Stampede Week		Calgary, Alberta	Dory Funk Jr. (c) vs. Geoff Portz for the NWA World Heavyweight Championship
July 6, 1973	Stampede Week		Calgary, Alberta	Harley Race (c) vs. Klondike Bill for the NWA World Heavyweight Championship
July 5, 1974	Stampede Week		Calgary, Alberta	Jack Brisco (c) vs. Danny Little Bear for the NWA World Heavyweight Championship
July 4, 1975	Stampede Week		Calgary, Alberta	Jack Brisco (c) vs. Dan Kroffat for the NWA World Heavyweight Championship
July 9, 1976	Stampede Week		Calgary, Alberta	Terry Funk (c-NWA) vs. Archie Gouldie (c-SW) in "Champion vs. Champion" match for the NWA World Heavyweight Championship and Stampede Wrestling North American Heavyweight Championship
July 8, 1977	Stampede Week	Stampede Corral	Calgary, Alberta	Harley Race (c) vs. John Quinn for the NWA World Heavyweight Championship
July 7, 1978	Stampede Week	Victoria Pavilion	Calgary, Alberta	Harley Race (c) b. Dory Funk Jr. for the NWA World Heavyweight Championship
July 6, 1979	Stampede Week	Victoria Pavilion	Calgary, Alberta	Nelson Royal (c) vs. The Dynamite Kid for the NWA World Junior Heavyweight Championship

=== 1980s ===
Date	Event	Venue	Location	Main event
July 4, 1980	Stampede Week		Calgary, Alberta	Harley Race (c) vs. Hercules Ayala for the NWA World Heavyweight Championship
July 11, 1980	Stampede Week		Calgary, Alberta	Harley Race (c) vs. Archie Gouldie for the NWA World Heavyweight Championship
July 3, 1981	Stampede Week		Calgary, Alberta	Nick Bockwinkel (c) vs. Bret Hart for the AWA World Heavyweight Championship
July 7, 1981	Stampede Week		Calgary, Alberta	Nick Bockwinkel (c) vs. Bret Hart for the AWA World Heavyweight Championship
August 25, 1983	Stampede Week		Vancouver, British Columbia	Nick Bockwinkel (c) vs. David Schultz for the AWA World Heavyweight Championship
July 11, 1984	Stampede Week	Saddledome	Calgary, Alberta	The Masked Superstar (c) vs. Sonny Two Rivers for the "World Heavyweight Championship"

== See also ==
- Hart Legacy Wrestling
