= List of former Eastern Sports Association personnel =

The Eastern Sports Association was a professional wrestling promotion based in Halifax, Nova Scotia from 1969 to 1977. Former employees in the ESA consisted of professional wrestlers, managers, play-by-play and color commentators, announcers, interviewers and referees.

== Alumni ==
=== Male wrestlers ===
Birth name:	Ring name(s):	Tenure:	Notes
Louis Acocella	Gino Brito	1971	
Alberto Amessa	Tony Romano	1971	
Orest Antonation	Bill Cody	1976–1977	
Antonio Baillargeon^{†}	Tony Baillargeon	1973	
Frank Hofmann	John Firpo	1976	
Douglas Baker^{†}	Ox Baker	1969	
Dennis Baldock	Bobby Bass	1974–1976	
Levi Banks	Sweet Daddy Banks	1977	
Roland Barriault	Frenchy Lamonte	1969	
Sydney Batt^{†}	Steve Rickard	1971	
Frank Earl Black	Earl Black	1972	
Steve Bolus^{†}	Steve Bolus	1975	
Wayde Bowles	Rocky Johnson	1969	
Adolfo Bresciano^{†}	Dino Bravo	1972	
Jack Brisco^{†}	Jack Brisco	1975	
Bob Brown^{†}	Bob Brown	1970, 1972, 1975–1976	
Phil Buckley^{†}	Phil Robley	1970–1971	
Rick Cain^{†}	Rick Gibson / Ricky Gibson	1977	
Ruben Cain	Robert Gibson	1977	
Roy Callender	Roy Callender	1976	
Dennis Condrey	Dennis Condrey	1977	
Jean-Louis Cormier^{†}	Rudy Kay	1969–1972, 1975–1976	
Leonce Cormier	Leo Burke	1969–1976	
Romeo Cormier^{†}	Bobby Kay	1969, 1971–1974	
Yvon Cormier^{†}	The Beast	1969–1976	
Giacomo Costa^{†}	Al Costello	1969	
Arnold Cream^{†}	Joe Walcott	1970	
Michael Davis	The Brute	1976	
Nicholas DeCarlo	Nick DeCarlo	1975, 1977	
Peter Dougherty	Pete Dougherty	1977	
Andrew Douglas	Andrew Douglas	1977	
Yvon Durelle^{†}	Yvon Durelle	1969	
Bill Eadie	Bolo Mongol	1974	
Michael Farhat^{†}	The Patriot	1975	
Willie Farkas^{†}	The Wolfman	1973	
Gary Fletcher^{†}	Man Mountain Mike	1975	
Paul Frederick^{†}	Paul Jones	1970	
Dory Funk Jr.	Dory Funk Jr.	1975–1976	
Terry Funk	Terry Funk	1976	
Jean Gagné^{†}	Frenchy Martin	1974, 1976–1977	
Hubert Gallant	Hubert Gallant	1975–1977	
Donald Gaston^{†}	Don Carson	1977	
Tommy Gilbert^{†}	Tommy Gilbert	1976–1977	
Ray Glendenning	Ray Glenn	1974	
Terry Gordy^{†}	Terry Gordy	1977	
Archie Gouldie^{†}	Archie Gouldie / The Stomper	1969–1974, 1976	
Neil Guay	Neil Guay	1974–1976	
Ib Solvang Hansen^{†}	Eric the Red	1972–1973	
George Harris^{†}	George Harris	1975	
Houston Harris^{†}	Bobo Brazil	1969	
Joseph Hason^{†}	Joe Dusek	1972	
Alfred Hayes^{†}	Alfred Hayes	1975	
Gilbert Hayes	Gil Hayes	1976–1977	
Dean Higuchi^{†}	Dean Higuchi	1969	
Don Heaton^{†}	Don Leo Jonathan	1969	
Edward Herbert	Ted Herbert	1974, 1976	
Frank Hester^{†}	Frank Hester	1975	
Leonard Holness	Lenny Hurst	1973–1974	
Jerry Jaffee	Jerry Jaffee	1977	
Don Jardine^{†}	The Spoiler	1969	
Dan Johnson^{†}	Danny Sharpe	1975	
Francis Julian^{†}	Frank Marconi / Gorilla Marconi	1976–1977	
Don Kalt^{†}	Don Fargo	1977	
Michel Lamarche^{†}	Mike Dubois	1972, 1974–1976	
Jack Land	Karl von Kramer	1973	
Louis Laurence	Louis Laurence	1977	
Allan Layton^{†}	Athol Layton	1969	
Paul LeDuc	Paul LeDuc	1969	
Pierre Lefebvre ^{‡}	Pierre Lefebvre	1972, 1974	
Pedro Godoy López^{†}	Pedro Godoy	1971	
Yvon Losier^{†}	Yvon Losier	1970	
Brian Mackney	Silent Mackney	1975, 1977	
George McArthur^{†}	Man Mountain Cannon	1969	
Benny McCrary^{†}	Benny McGuire	1972	
Billy McCrary^{†}	Billy McGuire	1972	
Ajandro Cruz Medina^{†}	Alex Medina	1971	
Henry Mittelstadt^{†}	Tiny Mills	1974	
George Momberg^{†}	Killer Karl Krupp	1972–1973, 1975	
James Morrison	Nature Boy Dillon	1973–1975	
Angelo Mosca^{†}	Angelo Mosca	1973	
Steve Musulin	Stonewall Jackson	1977	
Jim Myers^{†}	George "The Animal" Steele	1973	
Roman Napolitano^{†}	Tinker Todd	1970	
Patrick O'Connor^{†}	Pat O'Connor	1971	
Motoshi Okuma^{†}	Great Kuma	1974	
Juan Onaindia	El Gaucho	1974–1975	
Arnold Pastricks	Kurt Von Steiger	1973	
Paul Pellerin	Paul Peller	1974–1975	
Jack Pesek	Jack Pesek	1970, 1973	
Michel Pigeon^{†}	Jos LeDuc	1969	
Gilles Poisson	Gilles Poisson	1975	
Eric Pomeroy^{†}	Eric Pomeroy	1970–1975	
Phil Potts	Phil Watson	1977	
Freddie Prosser^{†}	Fred Sweetan / Freddie Sweetan	1969–1974	
Harley Race^{†}	Harley Race	1974	
Tom Renesto^{†}	Great Bolo	1970	
Steven Romero^{†}	Steve Romero	1976	
Victor Rosettani^{†}	Vic Rossitani	1969	
André Roussimoff^{†}	André the Giant	1975	
Gadowar Sahota	Gama Singh	1975	
Pete Sanchez	Gino Caruso / Pete Sánchez	1970, 1977	
Ron Sanders	Boris Kosloff	1970	
Terry Sawyer	Terry Sawyer	1977	
David Schultz	David Schultz	1977	
Don Serrano^{†}	Don Serrano	1971–1972	
Mike Sharpe^{†}	Mike Sharpe	1976	
Dan Sheffield^{†}	George Grant	1970	
Delmarnet Skinner^{†}	Del Skinner	1972–1974	
Joe Smith Jr.^{†}	Don Kent	1969	
Victor Tamayo	Joe Soto	1971	
Newton Tattrie^{†}	Geto Mongol	1974	
Tio Taylor^{†}	Tio Tio	1975	
Terrible Ted	Terrible Ted the Wrestling Bear	1971	
Les Thatcher	Les Thatcher	1970	
Ulyssee Thomas^{†}	Tom Shaft	1976	
O.J. Timmins^{†}	Ossie Timmins	1969	
Lajos Tiza^{†}	Lou Thesz	1975	
Roderick Toombs^{†}	Roddy Piper	1975	
Tapu Tuufuli	Tapu Tio	1976	
Michel Vigneault^{†}	Mad Dog Martel	1973, 1975–1977	
Rick Vigneault	Pat Kelly	1973–1974	
Kenneth Weaver^{†}	Johnny Weaver	1972, 1975	
Ed White^{†}	Sailor White	1977	
Bruce Woyan^{†}	Buzz Sawyer	1977	
Bill Wright^{†}	Bobby Red Cloud	1970	
Charles Yorkston^{†}	Terry Yorkston	1972–1975, 1977	
Pedro Zapata^{†}	Oki Shikina	1971	
Unknown	Abe Jacobs	1971	
Unknown	Bob Boucher	1975	
Unknown	Chin Lee	1972–1973	
Unknown	Cowboy Kirk	1969–1971	
Unknown	Davey O'Hannon	1976	
Unknown	Jack Ruffen	1975–1976	
Unknown	Jack Steele	1972	
Unknown	Jan Madrid	1974	
Unknown	Johnny Ringo	1972	
Unknown	Jerry Hall	1972	
Unknown	Larry Lane	1974	
Unknown^{†}	Luis Martínez / Luiz Martínez	1977	
Unknown	Phil Hickerson	1977	
Unknown	Rick Hamilton	1975	
Unknown	Yvon Roussel	1973	

=== Female wrestlers ===
Birth name:	Ring name(s):	Tenure:	Notes
Paulla Kaye Caller	Paula Kaye	1971, 1975	
Mahala Coker	Jan Sheridan	1971	
Frances Gravette	Fran Gravette	1970	
Mary Ann Kostecki^{†}	Penny Banner	1975	
Paula Lacher	Peggy Patterson	1971	
Betty Jo Niccoli	Betty Niccoli	1969	
Patricia Onaindia	Belle Starr	1975	
Joelene Parker	Sandy Parker	1970	
Tanya Lee Pope	Tanya West	1974	
Lillie Thomas	Lilly Thomas	1971, 1973	
Unknown	Ava Seedorff	1973	
Unknown	Jean Antone^{†}	1969	
Unknown	Kathy O'Day	1970	

=== Midget wrestlers ===
Birth name:	Ring name(s):	Tenure:	Notes
Shigeri Akabane^{†}	Little Tokyo	1975–1977	
Robert Bradley^{†}	Cowboy Bradley	1969–1970	
Marcel Gauthier^{†}	Sky Low Low	1971, 1973	
Jean Jacques Girard^{†}	Little Brutus	1969	
Lionel Giroux^{†}	Little Beaver	1969, 1972	
Katie Glass	Diamond Lil	1970	
William Guillot^{†}	Billy the Kid	1974–1976	
Harold Lang^{†}	Cowboy Lang	1970, 1977	
Stanley Littlejohn^{†}	Little Coco	1976	
Sylvia McMillian	Darling Dagmar	1970	
Roger Tomlin^{†}	Little Boy Blue	1972–1973	
Eric Tovey^{†}	Lord Littlebrook	1970, 1975	
Louis Waterhouse, Jr.	Little Louie	1975	
Unknown	Bobo Johnson	1971, 1974–1976	
Unknown	The Jamaica Kid	1969	
Unknown	Joey Russell	1971, 1973	
Unknown	The Mighty Atom	1970–1971	
Unknown	Sonny Boy Hayes	1972–1973, 1975	
Unknown^{†}	Wee Willie Wilson	1977	

=== Stables and tag teams ===
Tag team/Stable(s)	Members	Tenure(s)
The Burkes	Bobby Kay^{†} and Rudy Kay^{†}	1969, 1971
The Fabulous Kangaroos	Al Costello^{†} and Don Kent^{†}	1969
The LeDucs	Paul LeDuc and Jos LeDuc^{†}	1969
The McGuire Twins	Benny McGuire^{†} and Billy McGuire^{†}	1972
The Mercenaries	Frenchy Martin^{†} and Mad Dog Martel^{†}	1976–1977

=== Commentators and interviewers ===
Birth name:	Ring name(s):	Tenure:	Notes
George McArthur^{†}	Man Mountain Cannon	1969	Colour commentator
Les Thatcher	Les Thatcher	1970	Colour commentator
Unknown	Mike Duffy		Ring announcer

=== Referees ===
Birth name:	Ring name(s):	Tenure:	Notes
Malcolm Cormier^{†}	Mel Turnbow		

=== Other personnel ===
Birth name:	Ring name(s):	Tenure:	Notes
Jean-Louis Cormier^{†}	Rudy Kay	1969–1975	
Romeo Cormier^{†}	Bobby Kay	1969–1976	
Al Zinck	Al Zinck	1969–1979	

Company name to Year
Eastern Sports Association	1969–1976
International Wrestling	1977
Notes
^{†} Indicates they are deceased.
^{‡} Indicates they died while they were employed with the Eastern Sports Association.
