= Rudy Kay =

Canadian professional wrestler

Personal information
- Born: Jean-Louis Cormier; June 24, 1942
- Died: May 25, 2008 (aged 65) Moncton, New Brunswick, Canada
- Family: Cormier

Professional wrestling career
- Ring name(s): Rudy Kay; Rudy LaBelle
- Billed height: 5 ft 9 in (175 cm)
- Billed weight: 225 lb (102 kg)
- Trained by: Yvon Cormier; Dutchie the Spinner
- Retired: 1982

Jean-Louis Cormier (June 24, 1942 – May 25, 2008) was a Canadian professional wrestler, best known by his ring name Rudy Kay. Cormier competed primarily in Canada and often formed a tag team with his brothers; together, they are known as the Cormier wrestling family. He also worked behind the scenes, operating both the Eastern Sports Association (ESA) and its television program, International Wrestling. Kay held seven championships while wrestling for the ESA: five tag team titles while wrestling alongside his older brother Yvon; the short-lived Taped Fist Championship; as well as the promotion's most prestigious singles title, the North American Heavyweight Championship.

== Professional wrestling career ==
Cormier competed in boxing as a teenager. He was then trained for a professional wrestling career by Yvon, who was known professionally as The Beast, and another wrestler named Dutchie the Spinner. During his early career, Cormier used the ring name Rudy LaBelle while touring Australia with The Beast. Back in North America, he was given the ring name Rudy Kay by a promoter who thought that Cormier looked almost identical to a retired wrestler who had used the name.

In 1969, Cormier and Al Zinck formed the Eastern Sports Association (ESA), which promoted a television program named International Wrestling (IW). Several years later, Atlantic Grand Prix Wrestling, operated by Emile Dupré, took over the time slot from IW. In the ESA, the four Cormier brothers (Yvon; Leonce, who wrestled as Leo Burke; Jean-Louis, who used the ring name Rudy Kay; and Romeo, who was inspired by Jean-Louis to create the moniker Bobby Kay) often aligned with each other in feuds. The opponent would face one brother, and then move on to face the rest in succession. Jean-Louis also wrestled on occasional trips to Australia with his brother The Beast.

Cormier won his first title on July 29, 1969 when he teamed with The Beast to win the ESA International Tag Team Championship. They defeated The Fabulous Kangaroos (Al Costello and Don Kent) to win the title but soon dropped it to Jos and Paul LeDuc. They won the title back later that summer in a rematch and held it until the end of the 1969 ESA season. Two years later, they regained the championship with a victory over Eric Pomeroy and Fred Sweetan. Their final reign together began on October 28, 1975 with a win over Bob Brown and The Patriot. Once again, the brothers held the title until the end of the ESA wrestling season.

On November 18 that year, Rudy Kay also won the IW North American Heavyweight Championship by defeating Bob Brown. He was stripped of the title, however, because the ESA operated only during the summer months and the season ended without notice. He was unable to fulfill his obligation to defend it within 30 days. The ESA, which promoted shows until 1976, operated during the summer because the venues were used for ice hockey during the other months. The following year, he won the vacant ESA Taped Fist Championship with a victory over Mad Dog Martel. When the ESA closed in 1977, the title became part of Romeo Cormier (Bobby Kay)'s Trans-Canada Wrestling (TCW). TCW closed later the same year, and the Taped Fist Championship was retired. His final championship win came in September 1976; he teamed with The Beast again and defeated The Mercenaries (Mad Dog Martel and Frenchy Martin) to win the ESA Maritimes Tag Team Championship. Later that month, Martel and Martin regained the title in a rematch. Cormier retired as a professional wrestler in 1982.

== Retirement ==
After retiring from wrestling, Cormier took a job with Federal Express, which he held for five years. He also underwent knee surgery to fix problems resulting from his wrestling career. Cormier had a wife, Claudette, and four children: daughters Monique and Michelle, and sons Jamie and Jason. On May 25, 2008, Cormier died of sepsis in Moncton, New Brunswick.

== Championships and accomplishments ==
- Cauliflower Alley Club

- Men’s Wrestling Award (2009) as part of The Cormier Family

- Eastern Sports Association

- ESA International Tag Team Championship (4 times) – with The Beast
- ESA Maritimes Tag Team Championship (1 time) – with The Beast
- ESA Taped Fist Championship (1 time)
- IW North American Heavyweight Championship (1 time)
