= Freddie Sweetan =

Canadian professional wrestler (1937 – 1974)

Personal information
- Born: Frederick Prosser; November 5, 1937 Petitcodiac, New Brunswick, Canada
- Died: July 26, 1974 (aged 36) MacFarlane Bridge, New Brunswick, Canada

Professional wrestling career
- Ring name(s): Butcher #1; Freddie Sweetan; Killer Cox
- Billed height: 6 ft 2 in (1.88 m)
- Billed weight: 260 lb (120 kg)
- Trained by: Emile Dupree
- Debut: c. 1968

Frederick "Freddie" Prosser (November 5, 1937 - July 26, 1974) was a Canadian professional wrestler, better known by his ring name, Freddie Sweetan. He competed in certain North American regional promotions including the National Wrestling Alliance as well as Grand Prix Wrestling, Maple Leaf Wrestling and Stampede Wrestling during the 1960s and 1970s, most notably teaming with Paul Peller as the masked tag team The Butchers.

== Professional wrestling career ==
=== Early career ===
Born in Petitcodiac, a small village in Westmorland County, New Brunswick, but his family moved to Shenstone, New Brunswick, when he was a child.

Prosser met 7-year veteran, Canadian wrestler Paul Peller, who persuaded him to enter professional wrestling. Training under Emile Dupree in Shediac, Prosser eventually made his debut in 1968 teaming with Peller in Stu Hart's Stampede Wrestling as The Butchers. During their time in the promotion, they proved a popular tag team headlining sold out events in Calgary and Edmonton four weeks straight, which included matches against football player Bob Luce and Emile Dupre.

The following year, he and Peller joined Dupre, Leo Burke and others to tour the Maritimes with Atlantic Grand Prix Wrestling during the summer before returning to Calgary by the end of the year. Wrestling under the name Freddie Sweetan, Prosser teamed with Stampede Wrestling veteran "Bruiser" Bob Sweetan and eventually won the Stampede Wrestling Tag Team Championship before losing the titles to Bud & Ray Osborne in Calgary, Alberta on April 18, 1969. He and Peller would later win the titles the following year.

=== National Wrestling Alliance ===
In part to an agreement with Sweetan and Leo Burke, Prosser and Sweetan( being the same person) began wrestling in the Kansas City-area as Killer Kox and K.O. Kox with Bob Geigel's NWA Central States. Feuding with Bob Geigel & The Stomper over the NWA Central States North American Tag Team titles, he later faced Geigel in a singles match the following year on November 5, 1970.

While in the United States, he would also team with fellow Canadians The Beast in the Amarillo area and Michel "Le Justice" Dubois in the Mid-Atlantic region who together faced Terry & Bobby Kay, George & Sandy Scott, Big Boy Brown & Klondike Bill, Les Thatcher & Nelson Royal and, most notably The Royal Kangaroos whom they had a five-week feud with in 1973. During their time in the Carolinas, they would also face J. J. Dillon in Greensboro, North Carolina in 1972.

=== Return to Canada and later career ===
Returning to the Maritimes during the summer months, he also had a successful run with Eric Pomeroy feuding with The Beast, who enlisted Rudy Kay and Leo Burke, fighting over the ESA International Tag Team Championship throughout the early 1970s. He and The Beast would also engage in several single matches as well. He and Pomeroy would win the ESA International Tag Team titles three times before losing the titles to The Beast & Rudy Kay in Halifax, Nova Scotia on October 12, 1971. He would later team with a number of tag team partners including Kurt Von Steiger, Mr. X and J. J. Dillon defeating The Beast & Bobby Kay in September 1973.

Losing single matches to Jacques Rougeau and Johnny Valentine at the Maple Leaf Gardens in February 1974, the titles were later vacated when Dillon did not return to the promotion the following summer. However, he and Michel Dubois would reunite to regain the titles defeating The Beast & Bobby Kay in July 1974.

In 1971, while visiting with Prosser and Pomeroy in their motorhome, Prosser's father, Bernard, told Pomeroy that he was going to return to his house and commit suicide. After Bernard had left, Pomeroy and Prosser went to his house only to find several Royal Canadian Mounted Police (RCMP) officers were already at the scene where they informed the two, that Bernard Prosser, Freddie's father, had killed himself with a shotgun from the house.

== Death ==
After wrestling his last match on July 26th in Saint John, New Brunswick, he held a party at his summer cabin in MacFarlane Bridge, Albert County approximately 15 miles southeast of Moncton. Although it is unknown what happened during the hours after his friends had left the party, sometime during the night a fire broke out in the cabin resulting in Prosser's death. An investigation by the RCMP concluded that Prosser, whose body had been found near the front door, had been trapped in the cabin during the fire and died of smoke inhalation. The official cause of the fire was stated to have been accidental, and was most likely caused by Prosser having fallen asleep with a lit cigar in his hand.

However, wrestlers such as Emile Dupree have stated they believe the fire may have been started by a charcoal barbecue. Known to remain hot long after use, the grill may have caused the fire. This theory was supported by news reports and, according to one news account, officials had "declined to reveal circumstances surrounding the blaze" although an autopsy was performed at a local Moncton hospital.

Pomeroy, who had been unable to attend the party due to a prior commitment in Moncton, was asked by Prosser's mother to take over the funeral service. Prosser was cremated at the Fernhill Creamatorium, in Saint John, New Brunswick on July 29th, 1974 and he was buried alongside his father in the Shenstone Cemetery, Albert County. Freddie's mother Hazel, was laid to rest with her husband and son in 1997.

== Championships and accomplishments ==
- Central States Wrestling
  - NWA North American Tag Team Championship (Central States version) (3 times) - with Bob Sweetan
- Eastern Sports Association
  - ESA International Tag Team Championship (7 times) - with Eric Pomeroy (2), Michel Dubois (2), Kurt von Steiger (1), Mr. X (1) and J. J. Dillon (1)
- Stampede Wrestling
  - NWA International Tag Team Championship (Calgary version) (1 time) - with Bob Sweetan

== See also ==
- List of premature professional wrestling deaths
