= Yvon Cormier =

Canadian professional wrestler (1938–2009)

- Cormier, circa 1963

Personal information
- Born: November 3, 1938 Memramcook, New Brunswick, Canada
- Died: March 4, 2009 (aged 70) Moncton, New Brunswick, Canada
- Family: Cormier

Professional wrestling career
- Ring name(s): The Beast; Ivan The Lumberjack; Joe Gump; Pierre LeBelle
- Billed height: 5 ft 10 in (1.78 m)
- Billed weight: 250 lb (110 kg) - 255 lb (116 kg)
- Trained by: Les Ruffen
- Debut: 1963

Yvon Cormier (November 3, 1938 – March 4, 2009) was a Canadian professional wrestler. Competing primarily under the ring name The Beast, he and his three wrestling brothers made up the Cormier wrestling family. He wrestled in many countries but regularly returned to Canada, where he competed for the Eastern Sports Association (ESA) and the ESA-promoted International Wrestling (IW). He also competed in the Calgary, Alberta-based Stampede Wrestling for many years.

== Early life ==
Cormier was born into a family of thirteen children, of which four of the brothers became professional wrestlers, and another became a referee. His wrestling brothers were Leo Burke (Leonce Cormier), Bobby Kay (Romeo Cormier) and Rudy Kay (Jean-Louis Cormier). The oldest brother, Malcolm, worked as a referee under the name Mel Turnbow. As a teenager, he worked in the woods, shoed horses, and drove heavy equipment.

== Professional wrestling career ==
Cormier met Emile Dupré in 1957, who told him to consider a career in professional wrestling. Cormier began training, and later moved to Indianapolis, Indiana, to continue his preparation under trainer Les Ruffen, and made his debut in 1963. At first, he used the ring name Pierre Lebelle before switching to Ivan the Lumberjack. In Texas, he was known as Joe Gump. When he later ventured to the Mid-Atlantic territory, Jim Crockett, Sr. named him The Beast. At that time, he had thick, untamed hair and a large, curly beard.

The Beast spent part of his early career competing for Stampede Wrestling, where he faced such wrestlers as Stu Hart. He won his first championship there in 1966. He defeated Stampede veteran Dave Ruhl to win the Calgary version of the NWA Canadian Heavyweight Championship. Later that year, he dropped the title to Ruhl. He gained a different title the following year, however, when he teamed with Bob Sweetan to defeat the Christy Brothers (Bobby and Jerry) for the Calgary version of the NWA International Tag Team Championship on July 12, 1967.

In 1969, The Beast became the first holder of the IW North American Heavyweight Championship. On August 5, he gained a second title when he teamed with his brother Rudy Kay to defeat The Fabulous Kangaroos (Al Costello and Don Kent) to win the ESA International Tag Team Championship. Three weeks later, he dropped the North American title to The Stomper (Archie Gouldie), who became his longtime rival. He then began competing for the Amarillo, Texas-based territory of the National Wrestling Alliance (NWA). He won the NWA Western States Heavyweight Championship and held it for several months before losing it in a match against Ricky Romero on February 2, 1970.

Two months later, on April 4, The Beast teamed with Bull Ramos to win the NWA Western States Tag Team Championship by defeating Terry Funk and Romero. They continued to face Funk and Romero and dropped the title to them later that year. On July 27, The Beast regained the IW North American Heavyweight Championship from The Stomper and held it for over two months. He lost the championship to Eric Pomeroy that October. While competing in the ESA, The Beast also had another reign as International Tag Team Champion, this time while teaming with his brother Leo Burke. They held the title until dropping it on August 3, 1971, to The Beast's former partner Freddie Sweetan and former rival Eric Pomeroy. The Beast had two more reigns with the ESA International Tag Team Championship that year, however. Four weeks after dropping it to Sweetan and Pomeroy, he regained the title from them with the help of his new partner Archie Gouldie, with whom The Beast had once feuded over the North American Heavyweight Championship. The title reign lasted for a little over a month before Pomeroy and Sweetan regained the championship trophy. Pomeroy and Sweetan held the title for only one week, however, as The Beast recruited his brother Rudy Kay to help him win the championship back on October 12. This time, the brothers' reign lasted for just over seven months. Sweetan eventually regained the title while teaming with Mike Dubois on May 16 the following year.

Over a year passed before The Beast won another championship. In the summer of 1973, Sweetan was holding the ESA Tag Team Championship with Kurt von Steiger when The Beast teamed with Bobby Kay, the only one of his brothers with whom he had not held a tag team championship, and regained the trophy. Once again, however, Sweetan won the title back on July 31 along with partner Mr. X. During the ESA off-season, The Beast returned to Texas and reformed his tag team partnership with brother Leo Burke. In January 1974, the brothers defeated Don Fargo and Hank James to win the NWA Western States Tag Team Championship. Within two months, however, they lost the title to long-time rival Romero and his partner Dory Funk, Jr. Returning to the ESA, The Beast and Bobby Kay defeated Sweetan and Dubois to win the vacant Tag Team Championship. The reign lasted for less than one week before Sweetan and Dubois won the trophy in a rematch. The following month, The Beast had another short reign with the IWA North American Heavyweight Championship, winning the title and losing it back to Great Kuma in less than two weeks. He followed this with a victory for the Tag Team Championship with Burke on July 13, once again winning the title from Sweetan and Dubois. By early August, the brothers had dropped the title to Kuma and Geto Mongol.

The Beast and Rudy Kay had one last reign as ESA International Tag Team Champions together. They defeated Bob Brown and The Patriot during the autumn of 1975 to win the trophy. They held the title until the end of the ESA's 1975 season. The Beast's final title reign began in Texas on February 20, 1976. He and Leo Burke won a tournament for the vacant NWA Western States Tag Team Championship, defeating Romero and his son Silver Streak to win the title. They held it for one week before dropping it to Romero and Silver Streak on February 27.

During his career he wrestled seven different world champions, including six time limit draws. At one point, he wrestled Giant Baba in Japan in front of a crowd of 45,000 people. He also participated in numerous chain matches, in which he and an opponent were joined together by a steel chain attached to their wrists.

== Personal life ==
Cormier was known for his physical strength and intense exercise regimen. He was known to bench press 450 pounds with ease, and he was once recorded as bench pressing 527 pounds. During one photo session, Cormier lifted a telephone pole from the ground and carried it around while posing for pictures. According to one story, he once got upset with a horse that refused to cooperate and knocked it down with one punch.

Like his brothers, Cormier was a lifelong ice hockey fan. He also trained horses for harness racing, The most notable harness horse he ever was involved with was training Falcon Seelster as a 2-year-old before he was sold. Falcon Seelster would go on to set the all age world record for fastest mile trotted on a half mile track 1:51 which stood for 17 years. He also had six of his own Percheron horses. He had four sons, all of whom are being trained to wrestle, as well as one daughter. He was married to his wife, Doris, for 44 years until his death.

In May 2008, Cormier was diagnosed with lymphoma. He underwent treatment but suffered a heart attack soon after beginning. Doctors later determined that the cancer had moved into his bone marrow. He died on March 4, 2009, at a hospital in Moncton, New Brunswick.

== Championships and accomplishments ==
- Cauliflower Alley Club
  - Men’s Wrestling Award (2009) as part of The Cormier Family
- Eastern Sports Association
  - ESA International Tag Team Championship (8 times) - with Rudy Kay (3), Leo Burke (1), Archie Gouldie (1), and Bobby Kay (3)
  - IW North American Heavyweight Championship (4 times)
- Stampede Wrestling
  - NWA Canadian Heavyweight Championship (Calgary version) (1 time)
  - NWA International Tag Team Championship (Calgary version) (1 time) - with Bob Sweetan
- Western States Sports
  - NWA Western States Heavyweight Championship (2 times)
  - NWA Western States Tag Team Championship (3 times) - with Leo Burke (2) and Bull Ramos (1)
