= The Mad Russian =

The Mad Russian may refer to:

- Bert Gordon (comedian) (1895–1974), American radio comedian who originated "The Mad Russian" character
- Lou Novikoff (1915–1970), American baseball player
- Steve Rachunok (1916–2002), American baseball player
- Bill Vukovich (1918–1955), American automobile racing driver
- Eric Pomeroy (1933-2012), American professional wrestler
- Alexis Smirnoff (born 1947), Canadian professional wrestler
- Sam Ermolenko (born 1960), American motorcycle speedway rider
- Ilja Dragunov (born 1993), Russian professional wrestler
