= Bobby Kay =

Canadian professional wrestler (1950–2020)

Personal information
- Born: Romeo Cormier; 5 January 1950
- Died: 17 January 2020 (aged 70) Moncton, New Brunswick, Canada
- Family: Cormier

Professional wrestling career
- Ring name(s): Bobby Burke; Bobby Kay; Norton Jackson; Terry Kay; Terry Martin
- Billed height: 5 ft 9 in (1.75 m)
- Billed weight: 220 lb (100 kg)
- Trained by: Stu Hart
- Debut: 1967
- Retired: 1999

Romeo Cormier (5 January 1950 – 17 January 2020) was a Canadian professional wrestler best known by the ring name Bobby Kay. He was a member of the Cormier wrestling family, a group of four brothers who were all successful professional wrestlers. He worked in Canada and the United States from 1967 to the mid-1980s, briefly owning and operating part of the Eastern Sports Association. After retiring from wrestling, he performed country music professionally before taking a job with Loblaws.

== Career ==
Cormier grew up with eight brothers and four sisters on the family's farm in what is now Memramcook, New Brunswick. He became interested in professional wrestling because of his older brothers Jean-Louis, Yvon, and Léonce, who competed under the ring names Rudy Kay, The Beast, and Leo Burke, respectively. At age 17, Yvon took Romeo to Calgary, Alberta to train under Stu Hart.

Cormier made his professional debut in 1967 and wrestled in several countries. While touring the world as a competitor, he used several ring names. In Calgary's Stampede Wrestling, he used the name Norton Jackson. He then took on the moniker Terry Martin while wrestling in Central States Wrestling. He competed primarily as a tag team wrestler, and he won his first title belt in Kansas City on 31 October 1968. Teaming with his brother Léonce, who was using the name Tommy Martin, he won the Central States version of the NWA North American Tag Team Championship. The reign lasted for one week before they dropped the title to The Texas Outlaws (Dick Murdoch and Dusty Rhodes).

Cormier also competed for the Eastern Sports Association (ESA), which was affiliated with the National Wrestling Alliance (NWA). His brother Jean-Louis, competing as Rudy Kay, was both a booker and wrestler for ESA, and Cormier used his brother's ring name as the inspiration to become Bobby Kay. In the ESA, the four Cormier brothers often took turns facing the same wrestlers. A heel (villain) wrestler would face one brother, then move on to face the rest in succession. Bobby Kay held the ESA International Tag Team Championship several times in the ESA; his first came when he teamed with brother Leonce (who was then competing as Leo Burke) to win the title in mid-1973 by defeating Fred Sweetan and Mike Dubois. They held the title for about one month before dropping it to Sweetan and Kurt Von Steiger. Kay then teamed with brother Yvon (who was known as The Beast) to regain the title. The teams traded the championship back and forth once again over the course of the summer. They lost the title to Sweetan and J. J. Dillon in autumn 1973. After Dillon left the promotion, the championship was vacated; Kay and The Beast regained it the following year. The reign lasted less than one week before Sweetan and Dubois won the title. Teaming with Burke in June 1974, Kay had one final reign with the title; he sustained an injury, however, and Ron Thompson defended the championship in Kay's place.

Later that year, Cormier returned to Kansas, where he won the NWA Central States Heavyweight Championship in December. Cormier later returned to Stampede Wrestling, this time adopting the ring name Bobby Burke to form a tag team with his brother Leo Burke. They defeated The Royal Kangaroos in 1977 to win the Stampede Wrestling International Tag Team Championship. After dropping the title to Mr. Hito and Michel Martel later that year, they did not regain the belts until 1980, when they defeated Duke Myers and Bobby Bass.

Cormier competed in Toronto from 1982 to 1984 under the ring name Terry Kay, a name that he had also used while wrestling in Charlotte, North Carolina. He won the NWA Canadian Television Championship on 26 December 1982. He and his brother Leonce bought out Jean-Louis's stake in the Eastern Sports Association but ran into problems with their partner Al Zinck and television deals, which enabled Atlantic Grand Prix Wrestling (AGPW) to gain a stronger foothold in the Maritimes. His final title victory came in AGPW, where he won the company's North American Tag Team Championship in 1990 while teaming with his brother Leo.

== Retirement ==
Cormier retired from professional wrestling to spend more time with his wife and two children. He also performed country music as part of the Bobby Kay Band. He taught his longtime friend, former professional wrestling referee Hubert Gallant, to play the guitar. He also made another attempt at promoting wrestling events in such locations as Moncton, New Brunswick, and Halifax, Nova Scotia, in the mid-1980s. After arranging exclusive deals to promote shows in specific territories, Cormier had trouble attracting fans after the World Wrestling Federation moved into the same areas. Because the WWF had a larger budget and was able to gain access to arenas with larger seating capacities, Cormier's promotion was unable to compete. In 2006, a celebration was held in Memramcook to honor the four wrestling Cormier brothers. Cormier balanced competing in occasional wrestling matches with his job in shipping and receiving for Loblaws.

He died on 17 January 2020, at a hospital in Moncton, New Brunswick, at the age of 70.

== Championships and accomplishments ==
- Atlantic Grand Prix Wrestling
  - AGPW North American Tag Team Championship (1 time) — with Leo Burke
- Cauliflower Alley Club
  - Men’s Wrestling Award (2009) as part of The Cormier Family
- Central States Wrestling
  - NWA Central States Heavyweight Championship (1 time)
  - NWA North American Tag Team Championship (Central States version) (1 time) — with Tommy Martin
- Eastern Sports Association
  - ESA International Tag Team Championship (5 times) — with Leo Burke (2) and The Beast (3)
- Maple Leaf Wrestling
  - NWA Canadian Television Championship (1 time)
- Stampede Wrestling
  - Stampede Wrestling International Tag Team Championship (2 times) — with Leo Burke
