= Motoshi Okuma =

Japanese professional wrestler

Personal information
- Born: Motoshi Okuma; December 17, 1941 Soka, Japan
- Died: December 27, 1992 (aged 51)

Professional wrestling career
- Ring names: Motoshi Okuma; Mr. Okuma; Kumagoro Okmura; Great Okumra; Great Kuma; Gran Okuma; Daigoro Okuma
- Billed height: 1.73 m (5 ft 8 in)
- Billed weight: 130 kg (290 lb)
- Trained by: Giant Baba
- Debut: June 5, 1962

Motoshi Okuma (大熊 元司, Ōkuma Motoshi, December 17, 1941 – December 27, 1992) was a Japanese professional wrestler. He is best known for his tenures in All Japan Pro Wrestling (AJPW), Japan Wrestling Association (JWA), International Wrestling Enterprise (IWE) and the National Wrestling Alliance (NWA). During most of his career he teamed with Great Kojika.

== Career ==
Okmura was a sumo wrestler from May 1957 to May 1962. He made his wrestling debut in 1962 for Japan Wrestling Association after being trained by Giant Baba.

In 1967, Okmura made his debut in North America working for NWA Mid-America teaming with Great Kojika as the Rising Suns. They also worked in Georgia in 1968.

He left the Japan Wrestling Association in 1971 and returned to North America teaming with Masio Koma in Florida and Texas.

In 1972, he returned to Japan and started working for a brand new promotion called All Japan Pro Wrestling.

In 1974, he made his final North American tour where he worked for American Wrestling Association, Eastern Sports Association in New Brunswick, and Texas. He left North America in 1975.

Okmura wrestled what became the final match of his career on 4 December 1992, teaming with Haruka Eigen, and Masanobu Fuchi losing to Andre the Giant, Giant Baba and Rusher Kimura. This also was Andre's last match as he died a month later.

== Personal life ==
Okmura died from renal failure on December 27, 1992, at 51.

== Championships and accomplishments ==
- All Japan Pro Wrestling
  - All Asia Tag Team Championship (4 times) — with Great Kojika (4)
- International Wrestling
  - IW North American Heavyweight Championship (2 times)
  - IW International Tag Team Championship (2 times) — with Geto Mongol
- NWA Mid-America
  - NWA World Tag Team Championship (Mid-America version) — with Great Kojika
- Tokyo Sports
  - Service Award (1993)
- Western States Sports
  - NWA Western States Tag Team Championship (2 times) — with Masio Koma
