= Leo Burke =

Canadian professional wrestler (1948–2024)

Personal information
- Born: Léonce Cormier; June 29, 1948 Dorchester, New Brunswick, Canada
- Died: July 24, 2024 (aged 76) Calgary, Alberta, Canada
- Family: Cormier

Professional wrestling career
- Ring name(s): Leo Burke; Tommy Martin; The Atomic
- Billed height: 5 ft 11 in (1.80 m)
- Billed weight: 230 lb (100 kg)
- Trained by: Yvon Cormier; Rudy Kay
- Debut: 1966
- Retired: 1992

Léonce Cormier (June 29, 1948 – July 24, 2024) was a Canadian professional wrestler. He was born in Dorchester, New Brunswick. He competed across Canada, in several American promotions, and wrestled internationally for Puerto Rico's World Wrestling Council (WWC) and the National Wrestling Alliance (NWA) in New Zealand. In Canada, where he spent the majority of his career, he used the ring name Leo Burke. In the United States, he competed as Tommy Martin.

Over the course of his career, Cormier held 46 wrestling championships. Several of his title victories came as part of a tag team with his brothers, three of whom were also professional wrestlers. He had long-term storyline feuds with such wrestlers as Cuban Assassin and Bret Hart, both of whom he later reconciled with and joined forces with to hold tag team championships.

After his retirement in 1992, Cormier trained many wrestlers for the World Wrestling Federation (WWF) and World Championship Wrestling (WCW). He also wrestled occasional matches. He was honoured by the Cauliflower Alley Club, a fraternal organization of professional wrestlers, and inducted into the Stampede Wrestling Hall of Fame.

== Career ==
Growing up in a wrestling family, Léonce Cormier decided at age six that he wanted to become a professional wrestler. He followed in the footsteps of his older brothers Yvon and Jean-Louis, who trained him to compete.

=== 1960s ===
Cormier made his professional debut in 1966. Competing in Central States Wrestling, an affiliate of the National Wrestling Alliance (NWA), he used the ring name Tommy Martin. He won his first championship belt on October 11, 1968, by defeating Bob Brown for the NWA Central States Heavyweight Championship. Later that month, he gained another title when he formed a tag team with his brother Romeo (who was competing under the ring name Terry Martin) to win the Central States version of the NWA North American Tag Team Championship from Brown and Bob Geigel. The reign as tag team champions lasted for seven days before the Martins dropped the belts in a match against The Texas Outlaws (Dick Murdoch and Dusty Rhodes). The following month, Martin also lost the heavyweight championship to Rhodes.

=== 1970s ===
Cormier spent much of the early 1970s competing in the Maritimes for his brother Jean-Louis's Eastern Sports Association (ESA) (which owned International Wrestling, or IW) as both a singles and tag team wrestler. He did not want to use their name recognition to further his own career, so he took the last name of his friend, boxer Jackie Burke. The four Cormier brothers all competed in the territory and often joined forces in feuds with the promotion's top heel (villain) wrestlers. Burke won the IW North American Heavyweight Championship on June 22, 1971, by defeating Eric Pomeroy. The title reign lasted for three months; Gino Brito won the title from Burke during a match in Halifax, Nova Scotia, but Burke regained the championship five days later. On August 8, 1972. Burke teamed with his brother Romeo again (who was now wrestling as Bobby Kay) to win the ESA International Tag Team Championship. They held the title until the following June, when they dropped it to Fred Sweetan and Kurt Von Steiger. In August 1973, Burke became the first ESA Taped Fist Championship when the promotion awarded him the title.

Burke next competed in the NWA's Amarillo, Texas, territory. He teamed with another brother, Yvon, who competed under the ring name The Beast. In January 1974, they defeated Don Fargo and Hank James to win the NWA Western States Tag Team Championship, which they held for two months until a loss to Ricky Romero and Dory Funk, Jr. Returning to the ESA, Burke had a short reign as IW North American Heavyweight Champion in May 1974, which he followed in July with another reign with the ESA International Tag Team Championship. Holding the title with his brother The Beast, Burke held the championship for less than one month before dropping it to Geto Mongol and Great Kuma. That month, he also dropped the Taped Fist Championship to Mongol but regained it in a rematch within days. The following year, he held the North American Heavyweight Championship twice more, defeating Bolo Mongol and Bob Brown. For the second victory, Burke substituted for Killer Karl Krupp, who was unable to compete. Although Burke won the match, the title was later returned to Brown after Brown appealed the decision, claiming that a substitute wrestler should not be eligible to win a championship. Burke also had one final reign with the Taped Fist Championship before vacating the title.

Burke continued to compete for Central States Wrestling, and he teamed with The Beast in a tournament for the vacant NWA Western States Tag Team Championship. The brothers defeated Silver Streak and Ricky Romero in the finals on February 20, 1976, to win the belts but lost them in a rematch one week later. Returning from Texas to Nova Scotia, Burke became the only person ever to hold the ESA Maritimes Heavyweight Championship. He defeated The Brute to win the title; when the ESA closed in 1977, the title became part of Romeo Cormier (Bobby Kay)'s Trans-Canada Wrestling (TCW). TCW closed later the same year, and Burke's Maritimes Heavyweight Championship was retired. In 1976, Burke also defeated The Brute to begin another reign as IW North American Heavyweight Champion. He later dropped it to Michel Dubois but regained it by defeating Frenchy Martin on July 14, 1977. The title was also retired when TCW closed that month. Prior to the promotion closing, Burke also had a short reign with Hubert Gallant with the ESA Maritimes Tag Team Championship. While competing in Nova Scotia, Burke also challenged Terry Funk for the NWA World Heavyweight Championship. Burke controlled the majority of the encounter, but Funk intentionally got himself disqualified 55 minutes into the match. Because the title cannot change hands on a disqualification, Funk retained the belt.

In 1977, Burke moved to Calgary, Alberta to compete for Stu Hart's Stampede Wrestling. He teamed with Hart's son Keith to win the Stampede Wrestling International Tag Team Championship in early 1977 by defeating The Cuban Assassins. Although they dropped the belts to The Royal Kangaroos, Burke was able to regain the title in September 1977 while teaming with his brother Romeo (who was then competing as Bobby Burke). On December 10, they lost the belts to Michel Martel and Mr. Hito. In the new year, Leo Burke focused on competing as a singles wrestler and won the Stampede North American Heavyweight Championship on several occasions. He defeated Don Gagne (formerly known as Frenchy Martin) for the first title and Michel Martel for the second. He won it once more, by defeating Larry Lane, before leaving the area to compete briefly in New Zealand. Competing for the NWA territory there, he won the New Zealand version of the NWA British Commonwealth Heavyweight Championship. He soon vacated the title and returned to Stampede Wrestling.

=== 1980s ===
Upon his return to Calgary in 1980, Burke teamed with Keith Hart once again to win the promotion's International Tag Team Championship. He also began feuding with Keith's brother Bret Hart around that time. Burke defeated Mr. Sekigawa to win the North American Heavyweight Championship but lost it to Bret Hart later that year. He regained it in a rematch but dropped it to Hart once again. Burke returned to Canada's Atlantic Coast briefly to compete for Atlantic Grand Prix Wrestling (AGPW) and won the promotion's North American Tag Team Championship with Hubert Gallant. They lost the belts to Cuban Assassin and Bobby Bass that summer, but Burke was able to regain the championship by teaming with Stephen Petitpas. AGPW only promoted shows in the summer, and Burke then returned to Calgary during AGPW's off-season; while there, he teamed with his brother Bobby Burke again to regain the International Tag Team Championship in December 1980. Two months later, he had another reign as North American Heavyweight Champion after defeating "Dr. D" David Schultz (who later regained the title in a rematch). Another reign as NWA Central States Heavyweight Champion followed in November 1981, in which Cormier returned to his Tommy Martin ring name.

Returning to Stampede Wrestling once again, Burke entered and won a tournament for the vacant North American Heavyweight Championship, defeating Duke Myers in the final match on March 21, 1982, to win the title. He dropped it back to Bret Hart three months later. He followed this with a brief return in August 1982 to AGPW, where he defeated Rick Valentine to win the AGPW United States Heavyweight Championship. On November 19, 1982, Burke teamed with his longtime rival Bret Hart to win the Stampede Wrestling International Tag Team Championship. After losing the title the following month, the feud resumed, and Burke defeated Hart for the North American Heavyweight Championship on January 14, 1983; the men continued to face each other, and Hart regained the championship that May.

Around that time, Burke spent more of his time competing in Central and Eastern Canada. He wrestled for Maple Leaf Wrestling in Toronto, Ontario, where he feuded with Johnny Weaver. In the summer of 1983, he held both the AGPW United States Heavyweight Championship and the AGPW International Heavyweight Championship. He was also credited with an additional reign as United States Heavyweight Champion because he regained the title in a rematch after it was vacated due to a controversial match against The Spoiler. In February 1986, Burke had one final title reign in Stampede Wrestling, holding the International Tag Team Championship with Ron Ritchie.

Back in AGPW, Burke continued to win championships. He held the International Heavyweight Championship three more times from 1986 to 1989, and held the North American Tag Team Championship three times as well during that period. He won the tag team title by reuniting with former partners Hubert Gallant and Stephen Petitpas; the third reign came with Cuban Assassin, a former enemy of the entire Cormier wrestling family.

In the late 1980s Burke he decided to compete in Puerto Rico's World Wrestling Council. He quickly won the promotion's top title, the WWC Universal Heavyweight Championship, by defeating Caribbean wrestling veteran Carlos Colón on December 17, 1989.

=== 1990s ===
Burke held the WWC title until February 1990, when he dropped it to TNT. This was followed by a return to AGPW, where he held the tag team championship with his brother Bobby Kay. Back in Puerto Rico, Burke defeated Colón again on March 24, 1990, this time to win the WWC Television Championship. Four days later, he also won the WWC Caribbean Tag Team Championship while teaming with Chicky Starr. They won the title from Invader #1 and Invader No. 4 but dropped it back to them in May. Shortly after dropping the tag team title, Burke defeated Invader No. 1 in a singles match to win the WWC Caribbean Heavyweight Championship. Burke's final title victory came in the summer of 1990, when he defeated Ron Starr to win the AGPW International Heavyweight Championship for a fifth time.

== Retirement ==
After retiring from full-time wrestling, he went to Calgary in early 1992. His old rival and real-life friend Bret Hart arranged a position for Cormier as a trainer for the World Wrestling Federation (WWF, now World Wrestling Entertainment). Cormier helped train Ken Shamrock, Mark Henry, Adam Copeland (known as Edge in WWE), Jason Reso (known as Christian in WWE), and Andrew Martin (known as Test in WWE). He also trained two former Canadian Football League players for their careers in professional wrestling: former Edmonton Elk Jeff Thomas, who later opened his own wrestling training school, and former Ottawa Rough Rider Glenn Kulka, who went on to compete for the WWF.

When Cormier's contract expired, he began training wrestlers for WWF rival World Championship Wrestling. In January 2002, he was hospitalized with sepsis and was put on life support before recovering. In November 2005, he underwent surgery to replace his right knee; this was followed by a left knee replacement in February 2006. He had eight operations on his knees altogether. After his last surgery, WWE invited him back to resume training wrestlers, but Cormier declined. After his retirement, he worked in the now-closed bar at Calgary's Cecil Hotel and also operated a mobile coffee and sandwich shop.

Although Cormier considered himself retired from professional wrestling, he continued to compete from time to time. He was featured in a news video by the Canadian Broadcasting Corporation during a return to the Maritimes for a match in 1998. In June 2009, it was announced that he was participating in an Ultimate Championship Wrestling Legends Tribute Tour in Atlantic Canada alongside his former rival Cuban Assassin. In 2010, Burke refereed a match at the final wrestling card ever promoted at the Berwick Arena in Nova Scotia.

Cormier was inducted into the Stampede Wrestling Hall of Fame. In 2009, the Cormier wrestling family was honoured by the Cauliflower Alley Club in recognition of their contributions to the sport. Bret Hart has described Burke as "one of the greatest Canadian wrestlers ever". Les Thatcher, who competed against Cormier, said that he, "technically, is probably one of the most sound performers that ever stepped foot in a ring". Michel Martel, who wrestled against Cormier for several championships, called him "a great worker" and "a professional in the ring and outside the ring".

In 2013 Cormier appeared in the Victoria Pavilion, in Calgary, Alberta for the Hart Legacy Wrestling promotion.

On April 29, 2017, Cormier appeared alongside the Cuban Assassin as special guests at the Ultimate Championship Wrestling 10th Anniversary event at the Halifax Forum. The pair would answer questions during a fan access event, reappearing later in the night during a match where an injured Nick Strong was replaced by Cuban Assassin.

Cormier died on July 24, 2024, at the age of 76.

== Championships and accomplishments ==
- Atlantic Grand Prix Wrestling
  - AGPW North American Tag Team Championship (6 times) - with Cuban Assassin (2), Hubert Gallant (1), Bobby Kay (1), and Stephen Petitpas (2)
  - AGPW United States Heavyweight Championship (3 times)
- Canadian Pro-Wrestling Hall of Fame
  - Class of 2025 - Legend
- Cauliflower Alley Club
  - Men's Wrestling Award (2009) as part of The Cormier Family
- Central States Wrestling
  - NWA Central States Heavyweight Championship (2 times)
  - NWA North American Tag Team Championship (Central States version) (1 time) - with Terry Martin
- Eastern Sports Association
  - ESA International Tag Team Championship (2 times) - with Bobby Kay (1) and The Beast (1)
  - ESA Maritimes Heavyweight Championship (1 time)
  - ESA Maritimes Tag Team Championship (1 time) - with Hubert Gallant
  - ESA Taped Fist Championship (3 times)
  - IW North American Heavyweight Championship (6 times)
- NWA New Zealand
  - NWA British Commonwealth Heavyweight Championship (1 time)
- Professional Wrestling Hall of Fame and Museum
  - Class of 2021
- Stampede Wrestling
  - Stampede North American Heavyweight Championship (8 times)
  - Stampede Wrestling International Tag Team Championship (6 times) - with Keith Hart (2), Bobby Burke (2), Bret Hart (1) and Ron Ritchie (1)
  - Stampede Wrestling Hall of Fame (Class of 1995)
- Western States Sports
  - NWA Western States Tag Team Championship (2 times) - with The Beast
- World Wrestling Council
  - WWC Caribbean Heavyweight Championship (1 time)
  - WWC Caribbean Tag Team Championship (1 time) - with Chicky Starr
  - WWC Universal Heavyweight Championship (1 time)
  - WWC Television Championship (1 time)
