= Don Kent (wrestler) =

American professional wrestler (1933–1993)

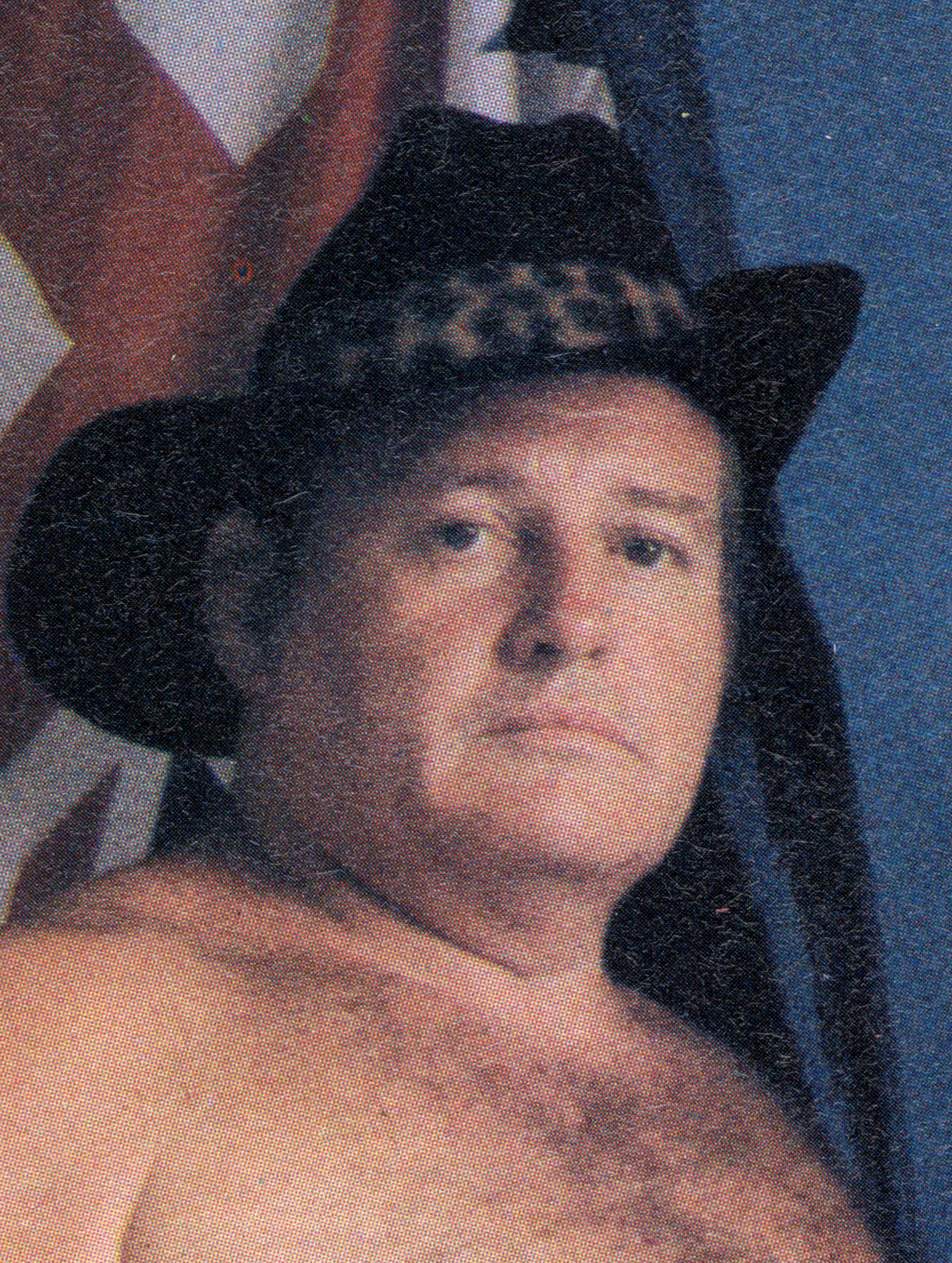
- Kent as one of the Fabulous Kangaroos in 1982

Personal information
- Born: Leo Joseph Smith Jr. June 24, 1933 Fort Benjamin Harrison, Indiana, U.S.
- Died: June 7, 1993 (aged 59) Battle Creek, Michigan, U.S.

Professional wrestling career
- Ring name(s): The Black Dragon "Bulldog" Kent; Don Kent; Doug Kent; Joe Smith; Ray Kent; El Cirujano
- Billed height: 5 ft 10 in (1.78 m)
- Billed weight: 250 lb (110 kg)
- Billed from: Australia (Kangaroos); Indiana
- Trained by: Larry Chene
- Debut: 1956
- Retired: 1993

Leo Joseph "Joe" Smith Jr. (June 24, 1933 – June 7, 1993) was an American professional wrestler who wrestled as Don Kent and also as The Black Dragon, Doug Kent, Joe Smith and El Cirujano during his 36 years in professional wrestling.

Don Kent is one half of The Fabulous Kangaroos alongside partners Al Costello, Bruno Bekkar or Johnny Heffernan. Despite being born in America, Kent was billed as Australian when he competed as a Kangaroo using the Kangaroos' "Ultra Australian" gimmick, complete with boomerangs, bush hats and "Waltzing Matilda" as their entrance music.

When Kent was not one half of the Kangaroos, he mainly worked as "Bulldog" Don Kent in NWA Mid-America and Big Time Wrestling in the singles and the tag team divisions until his retirement in 1986.

== Professional wrestling career ==
Kent attended St. Philip Catholic Central High School in Battle Creek, Michigan. He was recruited by the Boston Red Sox as a catcher right out of high school. Kent's father thought that Kent was too young to play professional baseball and insisted that he go to St. Benedict's College in Kansas. After graduating, Kent worked at a Veterans Administration Medical Center in his hometown of Battle Creek while being trained by Leapin’ Larry Chene for a professional wrestling career.

=== Early career (1956–1967) ===
Kent made his professional wrestling debut in 1956 working under such names as "Don Kent", "Joe Smith" and "The Black Dragon", generally working as a heel (bad guy) in the Michigan area. In the first half of the 1960s Don Kent went to Arizona and worked in the local wrestling promotion, where he was booked as a sadistic heel. In Arizona, Kent worked a storyline that drew full houses at the Phoenix Madison Square Garden against local face (good guy) Tito Montez. The two faced off week after week in a variety of specialty matches such as a chain match, "Arizona death match" and falls count anywhere match. The angle ended with a steel cage match that saw Montez win after overcoming Kent's cheating ways. One week after the storyline ended, attendance dropped by half and Don Kent soon left the area.

=== Fabulous Kangaroos (1967–1974) ===
In 1967, Al Costello reformed the tag team The Fabulous Kangaroos with Ray St. Clair who retired after six months with knee problems. A few months after St. Clair retired, Costello found Don Kent to don the bush hat. Kent, who was from Michigan, adopted the Ultra-Australian gimmick (but retained his American accent) and a second version of the Fabulous Kangaroos was formed. Costello and Kent teamed together on a regular basis from 1968 until 1974, approximately the same amount of time that Costello spent teaming with his original partner Roy Heffernan. The Kangaroos won their first tag team championship a few months after teaming up, during a tour of Japan for International Wrestling Enterprise. Over the years, they defended their title in promotions around the globe. In Canada, they were the first Eastern Sports Association International Tag Team Champions; in the World Wrestling Association, they held the WWA World Tag Team Championship twice. In addition to winning titles all over North America, they also made appearances for the World Wide Wrestling Federation (now known as World Wrestling Entertainment.

The Kangaroos frequented NWA Detroit, where they held the Detroit version of the NWA World Tag Team Championship for most of 1971. By the end of 1972, the Kangaroos began working for Nick Gulas’ NWA Mid-America. In Mid-America, they held the local version of the NWA World Tag Team Championship, the Mid-America version, on three occasions.

After a match in the Cincinnati Gardens in 1974, Costello's hip was damaged when an enraged fan threw a fire extinguisher from the balcony. Costello had hip replacement surgery later that year. The fan was arrested, served 15 days in jail, and was fined fifty dollars for damaging the fire extinguisher. With Costello unable to compete, the Fabulous Kangaroos split up. After the Kangaroos went their separate ways Don Kent returned to NWA Mid-America as a singles wrestler.

=== Working alone (1974–1981) ===
When Costello retired, Kent remained with Mid-America where he developed into a main heel as the "Dog Collar" wearing, barking "Bulldog" Don Kent. Kent teamed with Chris Gallagher and won the NWA Mid-America Tag Team Championship on two occasions, beating the teams of Frank Monte and Nick DeCarlo as well as Steve Kovac and Ricky Gibson for the title. Kent teamed up with Count Drummer to win the Mid America Tag Team title once more, defeating Jackie Fargo and George Gulas on November 6, 1974, losing the title to Fargo and Gulas three weeks later. Kent won the NWA Mid-America Heavyweight Championship, the main title of the promotion, in October 1974 by defeating Tony Charles. Kent lost his first Mid-America title to Jackie Fargo and won it twice more in 1975, first from Fargo and then later from "Crazy" Luke Graham. Graham defeated Kent on May 7, 1975, to end his third and final reign with the title.

In late 1975, Kent moved closer to home and work for The Sheik’s "NWA Detroit" (also known as "Big Time Wrestling") using his "Bulldog" Don Kent persona. On November 1, 1975, Kent defeated Mark Lewin to win the Detroit version of the NWA United States Heavyweight Championship. Lewin regained the title in December. On October 16, 1976, Kent regained the title in a bloody brawl against Pampero Firpo and held on to it until January 8, 1977, when he lost it to Gino Hernandez. Kent developed into a long running enemy of the Sheik, who was the most popular man in the promotion, with the two clashing many times in wild and bloody brawls.

In 1977, having recovered from hip surgery, Al Costello teamed up with Kent as The Fabulous Kangaroos for a tour of Puerto Rico with the World Wrestling Council (WWC). In Puerto Rico, the Kangaroos were billed on arrival as the WWC World Tag Team Champions. The Kangaroos lost the title to Carlos Colón and Jose Rivera on March 12, 1977. The Kangaroos remained in WWC throughout 1977 and into 1978, never regaining the WWC World Tag Team Championship. After their tour in Puerto Rico ended, Don Kent returned to singles wrestling and Costello focused more on managing due to his bad hip.

In 1977 Kent returned to the Alabama area to work for NWA Mid-America once more. Kent defeated Lanny Poffo to win his fourth Mid-America Heavyweight title in December 1977 and lost it to Poffo's brother Randy Savage on January 3, 1978. In 1979, Kent wrestled in Puerto Rico as a singles wrestler, winning the WWC Caribbean Heavyweight Championship from Chief War Cloud on January 6, 1979, and holding it for over 6 months until he lost it to Hurricane Castillo on July 21, 1979. Shortly after losing the Caribbean title, Kent moved up a level and defeated Puerto Rican legend Carlos Colón on August 3, 1979, only to lose the title to Invader I three weeks later in Ponce, Puerto Rico.

In the early to mid 80s, Don Kent returned sporadically to Big Time Wrestling to wrestle the Sheik's nephew Sabu.

=== Kangaroo return (1981–1983) ===
In 1981, Costello teamed Kent with Bruno Bekkar, who was best known for working in his native New Zealand and Australia, and work a tour as The Kangaroos for the WWC with Costello serving as their manager. Kent and Bekkar won the WWC North American Tag Team title from the team of Jack and Jerry Brisco on October 22, 1981. This version of the Kangaroos first lost to, then regained the titles from, Invader I and Super Gladiador before losing them for good on January 26, 1982, to Invader and Gladiador. After this tour of the Caribbean, Bruno Bekkar returned to Australia and New Zealand to work for the local promotions there.

Bekkar was replaced with "Johnny Heffernan" (Canadian Bob Della Serra), a storyline cousin of Roy Heffernan for what was the final Kangaroo version to compete. The team ended Terry and Dory Funk, Jr.’s year and a half long run with the WWC World Tag Team championship when they defeated them on May 1, 1982. The team held the gold for less than 2 months before losing the belts again. After ending their tour in Puerto Rico, Kent and Heffernan returned to mainland USA to work for Championship Wrestling from Florida, a promotion the Kangaroos had worked in 1962. In Florida, The Kangaroos won the NWA Florida Global Tag Team Championship four times. The final storyline involving the Fabulous Kangaroos saw Al Costello bring in J. J. Dillon to act as his short term replacement as he "took care of business". When Costello returned from his business trip, Dillon refused to give up the Kangaroos' contracts and was backed up by both Kent and Heffernan (in storyline terms). This storyline was designed to write Al Costello out of The Fabulous Kangaroos storyline and allow him to retire from wrestling altogether. Not long after Costello retired, Kent and Della Serra went their separate ways.

=== Later career (1983–1992) ===
After The Kangaroos split up for the last time, Kent worked mainly in Michigan with tours of Puerto Rico. In Puerto Rico, Don Kent donned a mask and worked under the name "Super Médico III" alongside Super Médico I. Kent was brought in as a storyline replacement for the real Super Médico III, who was played by Jose Estrada, Jr. Médicos I & III won the WWC World Tag Team Championship on August 4, 1984, from King Tonga and Gran Apollo. When Super Médico III was unmasked in October and revealed to NOT be Jose Estrada Jr., the team was stripped of their titles because they used an illegal man to help defend the title. After being exposed as the fake "Medico III" Kent returned to the United States and worked primarily in the Indianapolis-based World Wrestling Association where he continued to wrestle until 1989 holding the tag team title on several occasions in a criminally underrated team with Dr Jerry Graham Jr when he went into semi-retirement. By 1988, Kent was back wrestling tours of Puerto Rico's WWC as a single. He would continue to wrestle sporadically over the years to follow, stepping into the ring as late as 1992 at the age of 59.

== Death ==
Don Kent died on June 14, 1993, after suffering from Leukemia for a long period of time.

== Championships and accomplishments ==
- Big Time Wrestling
  - NWA United States Heavyweight Championship (Detroit version) (2 times)
- Central States Wrestling
  - NWA Central States Heavyweight Championship (2 times)
- Championship Wrestling from Florida
  - NWA Florida Global Tag Team Championship (4 times) – with Johnny Heffernan
- Eastern Sports Association
  - ESA International Tag Team Championship (1 time) – with Al Costello
- International Wrestling Enterprise
  - Trans-World Wrestling Alliance World Tag Team Championship (1 time) – with Al Costello
- NWA Mid-America
  - NWA Mid-America Heavyweight Championship (4 times)
  - NWA Mid-America Tag Team Championship (3 times) – with Chris Gallager (2) and Count Drummer (1)
  - NWA World Tag Team Championship (Mid-America version) (3 times) – with Al Costello
- World Wrestling Association
  - WWA World Tag Team Championship (5 times) – with Al Costello (2), Dr. Jerry Graham (2) and Chris Carter (1)
- World Wrestling Council
  - WWC Caribbean Heavyweight Championship (1 time)
  - WWC Caribbean Tag Team Championship (1 time) – with Bruno Bekkar
  - WWC North American Heavyweight Championship (1 time)
  - WWC North American Tag Team Championship (3 times) – with Johnny Heffernan (2) and Bruno Bekkar (1)
  - WWC World Junior Heavyweight Championship (1 time)
  - WWC World Tag Team Championship (3 times) – with Al Costello (2) and Super Médico I (1)
- Wrestling Observer Newsletter
  - Wrestling Observer Newsletter Hall of Fame (Class of 1996)
- Other titles
  - NWA Midwest Tag Team Championship (Tennessee & Kentucky) (1 time )- with Ed George
