= Alexis Smirnoff =

Canadian professional wrestler (1947–2019)

Personal information
- Born: Michel Lamarche; February 9, 1947 Saint-Lin, Quebec, Canada
- Died: January 5, 2019 (aged 71) Marietta, Georgia, U.S.

Professional wrestling career
- Ring name(s): Alexis Smirnoff; Cecil DuBois; Michel Dubois; Mike Dubois
- Billed height: 6 ft 3 in (191 cm)
- Billed weight: 255 lb (116 kg)
- Billed from: Russia (as Alexis Smirnoff)
- Trained by: Edouard Carpentier
- Debut: 1970
- Retired: 1988

Michel Lamarche (February 9, 1947 – January 5, 2019) was a Canadian professional wrestler, known by his ringnames Alexis Smirnoff and Michel "Justice" Dubois (Mike "The Judge" Dubois), who competed in North American regional promotions including the National Wrestling Alliance, including the Mid-South, Central States, Georgia and San Francisco territories, as well as brief stints in International Wrestling Enterprise, the American Wrestling Association and the World Wrestling Federation during the 1970s and 1980s.

== Professional wrestling career ==
=== Early career (1970–1974) ===
Born in Saint-Lin, Quebec, Lamarche was involved in amateur wrestling as a teenager before training under Edouard Carpentier for a career in professional wrestling. Making his debut as "Michel 'Justice' Dubois" in 1970, he wrestled for Montreal promoter Bob Langevin during the early part of his career and, after spending six months in the Kansas City-area, he returned to Canada becoming a major villain or "heel" in Quebec and the Maritimes region.

Winning the International Tag Team titles with Fidel Castillo in 1970, the two were billed as the "European Tag Team Champions" while touring Georgia Championship Wrestling in January 1971 defending the titles against Doug Somers & Bobby Shane, Jack & Jim Dalton, and The Assassins. During the match against The Assassins Castillo suffered a major cut by Assassin #1 during a match at the Atlanta Municipal Auditorium in Atlanta, Georgia, on January 29, 1971.

Lamarche also participated in a 14-man championship tournament for the vacant NWA Georgia Heavyweight title being eliminated by Assassin #2 in the opening rounds on February 5, 1971. He also appeared at an event for the World Wide Wrestling Federation defeating Frank Holtz at the Civic Arena in Pittsburgh, Pennsylvania, on March 24, 1972.

Between 1970 and 1974, he faced many of the top stars in the region including Johnny Rougeau, Abdullah the Butcher, The Sheik, and Mad Dog Vachon as well as his former trainer Edouard Carpentier eventually winning the Montreal International Championship before leaving for the United States once again.

=== National Wrestling Alliance (1975–1978) ===
After a two-year stint in the Mid-Atlantic territory teaming with Freddie Sweetan, Lamarche began wrestling for the Funk brothers in their Texas based promotion as "Mike 'The Judge' Dubois" in 1974 eventually winning the Texas Heavyweight Championship before moving on the Carolinas where he teamed with Jacques Goulet for two years, later losing to Dino Bravo & Tim Woods in the finals of a championship tournament for the vacant NWA Mid-Atlantic Tag Team Championship on April 10, 1977.

While touring with Ivan Koloff, he later began wrestling as "Alexis Smirnoff" in San Francisco during 1977. While in the area, he advanced to the finals of a 10-man championship tournament to fill the vacant NWA U.S. Heavyweight Championship being eliminated by Pat Patterson on March 12 although he later defeated Patterson for the title a month later on April 16, 1977.

Although losing the title to Dean Ho on July 16, he later faced masked wrestler Texas Red as well as wrestling against Pepper Gomez in a "taped fist" match on November 13, 1977. He wrestled veterans such as Ray Stevens, Harley Race and The Sheik as well as younger wrestlers including Sgt. Slaughter, Roddy Piper and Jimmy Snuka during his time in San Francisco.

The following year, he also wrestled in the St. Louis-area teaming with "Bulldog" Bob Brown, Doug Somers, Jack Krueger and Joe Palardy in early 1978. On April 28, he wrestled two matches in one night substituting for Buddy Wolff in a singles match losing to Pat O'Connor and later teaming with Doug Somers and Bennie Ramirez in a 6-man tag team match to defeat Kevin Sullivan, Terry Gibbs and "Sailor" Art Thomas.

=== Japan (1977–1979) ===
In 1977, Lamarche signed with the International Wrestling Enterprise and began touring Japan three times a year. During his stay in Japan, he became extremely successful wrestling IWA World Heavyweight Champion Rusher Kimura in a steel cage match on July 26, 1978.

He also teamed with The Atomic wrestling to a double count-out against IWA Tag Team Champions Great Kusatsu & Animal Hamiguchi on January 8 and defeating Kimura in a rematch on January 28 in a best of three falls match (as the third pinfall was via disqualification, Kimura retained the title). He did, however, defeating Ronnie Garvin for the NWA Southeastern title knocking him out at the Knoxville Night of Champions on May 18, before losing the title back to Garvin on June 1, 1979.

Returning to Japan, he defeated Kimura in their third encounter finally winning the IWA World Heavyweight Championship on July 21, 1979, before losing the title back to Kimura four days later.

He spent much of his later career in Japan, making over 30 tours to the country and later wrestled for All Japan Pro Wrestling and New Japan Pro-Wrestling having memorable matches against Giant Baba and Antonio Inoki as well as American wrestlers Bruno Sammartino, Ric Flair, Terry Funk, Bruiser Brody, Stan Hansen, Ted DiBiase and The Destroyer.

=== Return to North America (1979–1983) ===
Returning from Japan, he made a last appearance in the Mid-South region in a handicap match with Tank Patton, substituting for Blackjack Lanza, against Dick the Bruiser in St. Louis on November 24, 1978. Teaming with Koloff throughout the U.S. between 1979 and 1981, he and Koloff won the NWA Georgia Tag Team Titles from Ole Anderson & Jack Briscoe in March 1980 before losing the titles to Tony Atlas & Kevin Sullivan a month later. Although later regaining the titles on April 26, they lost the titles to the Minnesota Wrecking Crew for a final time on June 8, 1980, before leaving Georgia. He also lost to IWA World Heavyweight Champion Rusher Kimura on November 22, 1980, and to United Heavyweight Champion Jumbo Tsuruta in a best of three falls match with Lamarche taking the first pinfall in 45 seconds, although Tsuruta took the other two falls to retain his title on October 27, 1981.

Settling with his family outside San Francisco the following year, Lamarche made occasional appearances in Hawaii and Australia in between touring Japan and later returned to Montreal to team with Mad Dog Lefebvre for a time winning the International Tag Team Championship from Gino Brito & Tony Parisi before losing the titles to Raymond Rougeau, Sr. & Pat Patterson.

=== Return to Japan (1982–1984, 1986–1987) ===
A participant in the 10th annual Champion Carnival tournament in early 1982, he also lost to United Heavyweight Champion Jumbo Tsuruta on April 11, 1982, and also team with Stan Hansen against then International Tag Team Champions Jumbo Tsuruta & Giant Baba on April 3 before again losing to Tsuruta in a rematch for the United National Heavyweight title on April 12, 1983. Teaming with Bruiser Brody, he again failed to win the International Tag Team Championship from Tsuruta & Baba losing to the tag team champions on February 28, 1984.

During July 1986, he teamed with Bad News Allen defeating Yoshiaki Fujiwara & Kazuo Yamazaki on July 20 and fought to a double count-out with Seiji Sakaguchi & George Takano on July 27 although, with Johnny Mantell, lost a 6-man tag team match to Antonio Inoki, Kengo Kimura and Tastumi Fujinami on July 29. After losing to Antonio Inoki & Kengo Kimura on August 1, he later appeared in a series of matches for New Japan Pro Wrestling in Tokyo's Sumo Hall teaming with Hacksaw Higgins against Seiji Sakaguchi & George Takano on August 5, 1986 and with Scott Hall against Takano and Umanosuke Ueda on June 12, 1987.

=== World Wrestling Federation (1983–1986) ===
While on the east coast, he also wrestled matches for the World Wrestling Federation during the early 1980s wrestling several matches against WWF Intercontinental Champion Tito Santana in late 1984 as well as George Wells, and teamed with The Spoiler against Bret Hart and David Sammartino in several tag team matches during early 1985. After a short lived feud with Ivan Putski and Rocky Johnson, he faced André the Giant, Ted Arcidi, Pedro Morales, Tony Garea, Dan Spivey, Blackjack Mulligan and substituted for Nikolai Volkoff in several tag team matches with The Iron Sheik during early 1986 including a match against WWF World Tag Team Champions Greg "The Hammer" Valentine & Brutus "The Barber" Beefcake on January 23 before eventually leaving the WWF after declining a request to cancel his contract with the IWA.

=== Later career (1986–1988, 1999) ===
During the last years of his career, he worked for the American Wrestling Association teaming with Yuri Gordienko feuding with the Midnight Rockers for several months, eventually losing to the Midnight Rockers and Curt Hennig in a 6-man tag team match with Doug Somers and "Playboy" Buddy Rose at the supercard Battle by the Bay in June 1986. He later pinned Leon "Bull Power" White during a 6-man tag team match with Boris Zhukov and Yuri Gordyenko against Greg Gagne and Earthquake Ferris at the supercard Blood On The Sand in October 1986, although he soon left the promotion by the end of the year.

Following his retirement in 1988, he eventually opened a wrestling school and appeared in commercials for car dealerships in the San Francisco-area and the Golden State Warriors. He also appeared in several movies during the 1980s including Bad Guys, Body Slam, Alcatraz 2000 and frequently appeared on the television series The Fall Guy.

In 1999, Dubois made a one-time appearance for promoter Jacques Rougeau, Jr.'s International Wrestling 2000 coming out of retirement to team with Ronnie and Jimmy Garvin in a 6-man tag team match against Jacques and Raymond Rougeau and their father Jacques Rougeau, Sr. in Montreal on August 9, 1999.

== Personal life ==
The Cauliflower Alley Club's Facebook page posted the following about Lamarche on January 4, 2019: "Alexis Smirnoff is in hospice care in Marietta, Georgia, with kidney failure. The prognosis is grim. Please keep Alexis and his family in your thoughts and prayers." Smirnoff died on January 5, 2019.

== Championships and accomplishments ==
- Big Time Wrestling (San Francisco)
  - NWA United States Heavyweight Championship (San Francisco version) (1 time)
  - NWA World Tag Team Championship (San Francisco version) (1 time) – with Bob Roop
- Cauliflower Alley Club
  - Men's Wrestling Award (2018)
- Central States Wrestling
  - NWA Central States Heavyweight Championship (1 time)
  - NWA World Tag Team Championship (Central States version) (1 time) – with Bob Brown
- Eastern Sports Association
  - ESA International Tag Team Championship (4 times) – with Fred Sweetan
- Georgia Championship Wrestling
  - NWA Georgia Tag Team Championship (1 time) – with Ivan Koloff
- International Wrestling Association (Montreal)
  - Montreal International Heavyweight Championship (1 time)
  - Montreal International Tag Team Championship (1 time) with Fidel Castillo
- International Wrestling Enterprise
  - IWA World Heavyweight Championship (1 time)
- Lutte Internationale
  - IW International Heavyweight Championship (1 time)
  - IW International Tag Team Championship (1 time) – with Pierre Lefebvre
  - IW North American Heavyweight Championship (1 time)
- National Wrestling Alliance
  - NWA Southeastern Heavyweight Championship (Northern Division) (1 time) ^{1}
- Pro Wrestling Illustrated
  - Ranked No. 319 in the top 500 best singles wrestlers of the PWI 500 in 2003

=== Notes ===
^{1}NWA records aren't clear as to which promotion he was working for at the time he won the championship. While usually defended in Southeastern Championship Wrestling, it was occasionally defended in other NWA affiliated promotions.
