= Killer Karl Krupp =

Dutch-Canadian professional wrestler (1934–1995)

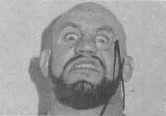
- Momberg, circa 1979

Personal information
- Born: George Momberg; May 13, 1934 Holland, Netherlands
- Died: August 24, 1995 (aged 61) Moncton, New Brunswick, Canada

Professional wrestling career
- Ring name(s): Killer Karl Krupp; Dutch Momberg; Mad Dog Momberg; Baron von Krupp; Ichiban #1
- Billed height: 6 ft 4 in (1.93 m)
- Billed weight: 260 lb (120 kg)
- Billed from: Germany
- Debut: 1957
- Retired: 1988

George Momberg (May 13, 1934 – August 24, 1995), better known by the ring name Killer Karl Krupp, was a Dutch-born professional wrestler famous during the 1970s and 1980s.

== Professional wrestling career ==
Killer Karl Krupp (right) with tag team partner Karl Von Stroheim (left)

Momberg was interested in amateur wrestling as a youth. At the age of 16, he went to Canada and was involved in many sports, rowing and participating in amateur wrestling at the Hamilton Jewish Centre and in the local YMCA. He made his debut as a professional wrestler in 1957 as "The Flying Dutchman" Dutch Momberg, and started wrestling in Canada around 1965.

While working for Stampede Wrestling in December 1971, Momberg hit upon the gimmick that would make him a star, the character of German heel, Killer Karl Krupp. The gimmick had been around a good twenty years by this time, first popularized by Hans Schmidt and carried further by later stars, such as Fritz von Erich. With eyes bulging, a shaved head and short black beard framing a leering grin, Krupp represented a wildly cartoonish, yet frightening wrestling villain. He accessorized for the part with a monocle, riding crop, heavy black boots and black ring cape, and delivered ranting promos in an affected German accent rife with mangled pronunciations. Utilizing other familiar staples of the German heel gimmick, Krupp goose-stepped to the ring, threw stiff-arm salutes, and used an Iron Claw hold (the 'Eye Claw') as his finishing move. What was unknown to the public at the time was that Momberg hated the Nazis, who had occupied his homeland.

On June 10, 1972, Krupp defeated Leo Burke for the ESA's IW North American Heavyweight Championship. Early the next year he went to Japan, where he had many of his early successes, co-holding the NWA International Tag Team Championship twice between February and April 1973 (once with Johnny Valentine and once each with fellow 'evil Germans', Fritz Von Erich and replacement partner Karl von Steiger). He also reached the final rounds of the 1974 and 1975 New Japan Pro-Wrestling World League Tournaments, both of which he lost to Antonio Inoki. Krupp and Von Erich worked as the "Iron Claw Masters" in Japan. Stateside, Krupp first became a big name in the Texas territory in 1973, before moving on to Portland in 1974, where he feuded with Dutch Savage. He also appeared in CWF Florida in 1975, where he was a two-time winner of the NWA Southern Heavyweight Championship. He then moved on to Dick the Bruiser's WWA in Indiana under the moniker Baron von Krupp, which he would also use in Detroit.

In 1980, Krupp came to Memphis, where he tangled with Jerry Lawler. He returned before long, however, to Atlantic Canada for a memorable run in Atlantic Grand Prix Wrestling. In the mid-1980s, near the end of his career, he feuded with Angelo Mosca around southern Ontario. By the end of March 1983, he began wrestling in the Dallas Texas-based territory for Fritz Von Erich's World Class Championship Wrestling. In July 1987, Krupp wrestled his last recorded match before retiring in 1988.

== Later life ==
George Momberg retired to his adopted home in Atlantic Canada in 1988, working for the Midland Trucking Company. He died on August 24, 1995, in Moncton, New Brunswick, after contracting hepatitis while wrestling in Japan.

== Championships and accomplishments ==
- All Japan Pro Wrestling

- NWA International Tag Team Championship (Japan version) (2 times) – with Johnny Valentine (1) and Fritz von Erich (1)

- Atlantic Grand Prix Wrestling

- AGPW European Championship (1 time)
- AGPW International Championship (2 times)
- AGPW North American Tag Team Championship (1 time) – with Hans Herman

- Championship Wrestling from Florida

- NWA Southern Heavyweight Championship (Florida version) (2 times)

- Continental Wrestling Association

- AWA Southern Tag Team Championship (1 time) – with El Mongol

- Eastern Sports Association

- IW North American Heavyweight Championship (3 times)

- Memphis Wrestling Hall of Fame
  - Class of 2022
- NWA Big Time Wrestling

- NWA Brass Knuckles Championship (Texas version) (4 times)

- NWA Western States Sports

- NWA Brass Knuckles Championship (Amarillo version) (1 time)

- Pacific Northwest Wrestling

- NWA Pacific Northwest Tag Team Championship – with Kurt von Steiger (1 time)

- World Championship Wrestling (Australia)

- NWA Austra-Asian Tag Team Championship (1 time) – with Butcher Brannigan

- World Wrestling Council

- WWC North American Heavyweight Championship (1 time)

== See also ==
- List of gridiron football players who became professional wrestlers
