= Jim Dalton =

Australian rules footballer, born 1904

Personal information
- Full name: James Sylvester Dalton
- Born: 29 December 1904; Longford, Tasmania
- Died: 2 June 1969 (aged 64); Hobart, Tasmania
- Height: 167 cm (5 ft 6 in)
- Weight: 65 kg (143 lb)

Playing career^{1}
Years	Club	Games (Goals)
1927–28	St Kilda	11 (3)
- ^{1} Playing statistics correct to the end of 1928.

Jim Dalton (29 December 1904 – 2 June 1969) was an Australian rules footballer who played with St Kilda in the Victorian Football League (VFL).
