= Cormier wrestling family =

Group of Canadian brothers who competed in professional wrestling

The Cormier wrestling family was a group of Canadian brothers who competed in professional wrestling. They were born in New Brunswick and wrestled primarily in Canada. They also competed in the United States and had stints in several other countries. On many occasions, the Cormiers wrestled together as tag team partners. Two of the brothers were also involved in promoting wrestling. The family has been honored by the Cauliflower Alley Club, a social organization composed of people in the wrestling business, for their contributions to the sport. Jean-Louis died in 2008, Yvon in 2009 and Romeo in 2020.

== Family ==
The Cormier brothers were the sons of Edmond Cormier and Bernadette Doucette. They grew up on a farm in what is now Memramcook, New Brunswick. Four of the brothers had long careers as professional wrestlers, while a fifth, Malcolm Cormier, competed briefly before becoming a referee. None of the brothers wrestled under the family surname, however, as they all adopted ring names. One of the brothers explained that the brothers' real names were too hard to pronounce, so they adopted other names that were easier for international fans. Yvon Cormier was given the name The Beast, Jean-Louis was known as Rudy Kay, Leonce took the name Leo Burke, and Romeo competed as Bobby Kay. Malcolm, the oldest of the brothers involved in wrestling, used the name Mel Turnbow while working as a referee.

The brothers often competed together in various promotions; in the Eastern Sports Association (ESA), which Jean-Louis (Rudy) owned, they scripted the feuds so that the four brothers often faced a common opponent. A heel (villain) wrestler would face Rudy and emerge victorious from a series of matches; they would then do the same with Bobby and then Leo before facing The Beast. They also held numerous tag team titles together.

== Brothers ==
=== The Beast ===
Yvon Cormier, competing mainly as The Beast, made his professional wrestling debut in 1963. He has been described as "probably the most-travelled" of the brothers, but most of his title victories came in the Maritimes. He held the ESA International Tag Team Championship eight times, including at least one reign with each of his three brothers. He also competed internationally, including stints in the United States, Japan, and Australia. He was known for his strength and demonstrations of his power. During his career, he wrestled against seven world champions. Yvon Cormier died of bone marrow cancer on March 4, 2009.

=== Rudy Kay ===
Jean-Louis Cormier, who was given the ring name Rudy Kay because he resembled a retired wrestler who had used the same name, spent much of his career balancing his roles as promoter and wrestler. He helped found the ESA in 1969 and operated shows under the title International Wrestling (IW). He won five tag team championships while teaming with The Beast and held two titles as a singles wrestler. He retired from active competition in 1982 and died of sepsis on May 25, 2008.

=== Leo Burke ===
Making his debut in 1966, Léonce Cormier took the ring name Leo Burke because he wanted to prove that he could succeed on his own rather than because of his brothers' fame. He held forty championships, including six reigns with the IW North American Heavyweight Championship and eight with the Stampede Wrestling International Tag Team Championship. He also held major titles in New Zealand and Puerto Rico. After retiring from wrestling, he began training aspiring wrestlers for both the World Wrestling Federation and World Championship Wrestling. He has moved to Calgary, Alberta and had several other jobs since retiring, but he continues to wrestle occasionally while visiting the Maritimes.

=== Bobby Kay ===
Romeo Cormier, the youngest of the brothers to wrestle professionally, made his debut in 1967. Although he used the name Bobby Kay for the majority of his career, he also used different ring names while teaming with his brother Leonce. While Leonce was competing as Tommy Martin, Romeo took the name Terry Martin; in 1977, when Leonce had returned to the ring name Leo Burke, Romeo competed as Bobby Burke to win the Stampede Wrestling International Tag Team Championship with his brother. The majority of his championships came as part of a tag team, but he also won the NWA Central States Heavyweight Championship in 1974. Late in his career, he became co-owner of the ESA, but the promotion closed due to conflicts between the owners and the rival Atlantic Grand Prix Wrestling's ability to secure an important television contract. He later worked for Loblaw Companies, and died aged 70 on January 17, 2020.

== Legacy ==
Jean-Louis's ESA promotion helped launch the careers of several wrestlers, including Rick Martel, who went on to win the American Wrestling Association World Championship. After retiring from full-time competition, Leonce trained many professional wrestlers, including Ken Shamrock, Mark Henry, Edge, Christian, and Test, all of whom have worked for World Wrestling Entertainment.

All five of the Cormier brothers involved in wrestling were honored during a celebration in their home town of Memramcook in 2006. They also received an award from the Cauliflower Alley Club in 2009. Canadian wrestling promoter Emile Dupré has said that the Cormiers "were to New Brunswick what the Hart family was to Calgary".

== Championships and accomplishments ==
- Cauliflower Alley Club
  - Men’s Wrestling Award (2009)
