= IW North American Heavyweight Championship =

Professional wrestling championship

This is a list of people who held the "North American Heavyweight Title" under the banner of International Wrestling (IW) from 1969 to 1984. The promotion was owned by the Eastern Sports Association from 1969 until 1976. The IW promotion ends with end of 1984 season, and the title was discontinued.

== North American Heavyweight Title ==
Key
No.	Overall reign number
Reign	Reign number for the specific champion
Days	Number of days held

No.	Champion	Championship change			Reign statistics		Notes	Ref.
No.	Champion	Date	Event	Location	Reign	Days	Notes	Ref.
1	The Beast	July 8, 1969	IW show	N/A	1	49		
2	Archie “The Stomper” Gouldie	August 26, 1969	IW show	N/A	1	42		
3	Bobo Brazil	October 7, 1969	IW show	N/A	1	224		
4	Bobby Red Cloud	May 19, 1970	IW show	N/A	1	14		
5	Archie "The Stomper" Gouldie	June 2, 1970	IW show	N/A	2	63		
6	The Beast	August 4, 1970	IW show	N/A	2	280		
7	Eric Pomeroy	May 11, 1971	IW show	N/A	1	42		
8	Leo Burke	June 22, 1971	IW show	N/A	1	92		
9	Gino Brito	September 22, 1971	IW show	Halifax, Nova Scotia	1	5		
10	Leo Burke	September 27, 1971	IW show	Halifax, Nova Scotia	2	257		
11	Killer Karl Krupp	June 10, 1972	IW show	N/A	1	N/A		
12	Eric Pomeroy	July 1972	IW show	N/A	2	N/A		
13	Killer Karl Krupp	July 25, 1972	IW show	Halifax, Nova Scotia	2	49		
14	The Beast	September 12, 1972	IW show	Halifax, Nova Scotia	3	N/A		
15	Jim Dillon	May 1973	IW show	N/A	1	N/A		
16	Killer Karl Krupp	August 1973	IW show	N/A	3	N/A		
17	Archie "The Stomper" Gouldie	September 1973	IW show	N/A	3	N/A	In October, the Stomper returned to Stampede Wrestling, and in December won their North American title from Omar Atlas. On February 22, 1974, in Calgary, the Stomper lost the (Stampede) North American Title to Harley Race. ESA may have used this title change to explain Harley Race entering the Maritimes at the start of the 1974 season in possession of the North American belt - omitting that the Stomper had won back the Stampede version in March.	
18	Harley Race	May 7, 1974	IW show	N/A	1	N/A		
19	Leo Burke	May 1974	IW show	N/A	3	N/A		
20	Great Kuma	May 1974	IW show	N/A	1	N/A		
21	The Beast	June 1974	IW show	N/A	4	N/A		
22	Great Kuma	June 1974	IW show	N/A	2	N/A		
23	Eric Pomeroy	July 1974	IW show	N/A	3	N/A		
24		August 1974	IW show	N/A	1	N/A		
25	Archie "The Stomper" Gouldie	September 1974	IW show	N/A	4	N/A		
26		September 1974	IW show	N/A	2	N/A		
27	Leo Burke	May 6, 1975	IW show	N/A	4	84	Was supposedly won in Detroit.	
28	Bob Brown	July 29, 1975	IW show	N/A	1	84		
29	Leo Burke	October 21, 1975	IW show	N/A	5	N/A	Substituting for Pat O’Connor.	
30	Bob Brown	1975	IW show	N/A	5	N/A	Returned to Brown upon appeal.	
31	Rudy Kay	November 1975	IW show	N/A	1	N/A		
		N/A	N/A	N/A			The season ended without notice, leaving Rudy Kay unable to defend within 30 days.	
32	Tommy Gilbert	April 24, 1976	IW show	USA	1	N/A	Won a tournament to be crowned champion.	
33	The Brute	May 1976	IW show	N/A	1	N/A		
34	Tommy Gilbert	May 27, 1976	IW show	Saint John, New Brunswick	2	N/A		
35	The Brute	June 1976	IW show	N/A	2	N/A		
36	Leo Burke	September 1976	IW show	N/A	5	N/A		
37	Michel Dubois	1976	IW show	N/A	1	N/A		
38		N/A	IW show	N/A		N/A		
39	Steve Bolus	June 9, 1977	TCW show	N/A	1	N/A	Arrived as champion	
40	Frenchy Martin	June 1977	TCW show	N/A	1	N/A		
41	Leo Burke	July 14, 1977	TCW show	N/A	6	N/A		
—	Deactivated	July 1977	TCW show	—	—	—	TCW closed	

There was not a North American Title in the Maritimes again until 1984, when there were two of them.

1. 84/04 Archie “The Stomper” Gouldie arrived at rival Atlantic Grand Prix Wrestling as North American Champion. This was a newly created title for AGPW.
2. 84/06 Leo Burke arrives at International Wrestling as North American Champion, this title had a history with Toronto's Maple Leaf Wrestling, starting in 1982, when Leo Burke arrived there as Champion, with the old ESA North American belt.

Key
No.	Overall reign number
Reign	Reign number for the specific champion
Days	Number of days held

No.	Champion	Championship change			Reign statistics		Notes	Ref.
No.	Champion	Date	Event	Location	Reign	Days	Notes	Ref.
1	Leo Burke	October 1982	MLW show	N/A	1	N/A		
2	Johnny Weaver	April 10, 1983	MLW show	Toronto, Ontario	1	49		
3	Leo Burke	May 29, 1983	MLW show	Toronto, Ontario	2	N/A	Maple Leaf Wrestling was sold to WWF in July 1984. Leo Burke returned to the Maritimes as North American Champion.	
4	Archie "The Stomper" Gouldie	August 1984	N/A	N/A	1		The Stomper jumped to International Wrestling, won title unification match over Leo Burke.	
—	Deactivated	1984	—	—	—	—	The North American Championship is retired when International Wrestling closes.	

== Sources ==
Title history at wrestling-titles.com
