= Al Costello =

Italian-Australian professional wrestler (1919–2000)

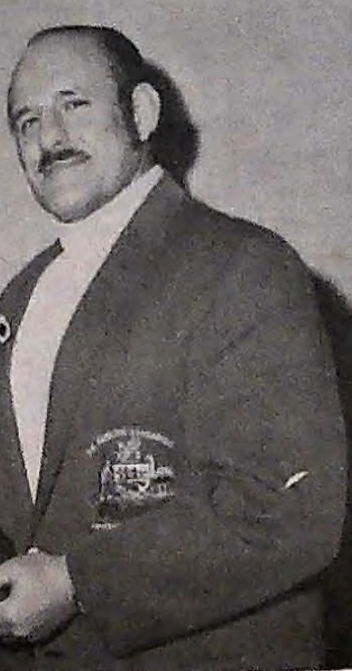
- Costello c. 1973

Personal information
- Born: Giacomo Costa; 14 December 1919 Santa Marina Salina, Italy
- Died: 22 January 2000 (aged 80) Clearwater, Florida, U.S.

Professional wrestling career
- Ring name: Al Costello
- Billed height: 5 ft 9 in (1.75 m)
- Billed weight: 235 lb (107 kg)
- Billed from: Australia
- Trained by: Basher Bonas
- Debut: 1938
- Retired: 1987

Giacomo Costa (14 December 1919 – 22 January 2000) was an Italian Australian professional wrestler best known by his ring name, Al Costello. Costello was the first professional wrestler to be nicknamed "The Man of a Thousand Holds" because of his innovative and very technical style.

Costello was the creator and original member of the tag team The Fabulous Kangaroos, whose "Ultra Australian" gimmick complete with boomerangs, bush hats and the song "Waltzing Matilda" as their entrance music, existed in various forms from 1957 until 1983. Costello was either an active wrestler, or a manager in all versions of The Fabulous Kangaroos. He and Roy Heffernan are arguably the most famous version of The Kangaroos, regarded as one of the top tag teams to ever compete in professional wrestling, and are often credited with popularizing tag team wrestling in the late 1950s and 1960s.

Costello later formed other versions of The Fabulous Kangaroos with Ray St. Clair, Don Kent and Tony Charles. He also managed the team of Don Kent & Bruno Bekkar and later on "Johnny Heffernan" under The Fabulous Kangaroos name.

Costello officially retired from wrestling in 1983 but still made a few brief returns to the ring after that. In 1993, he managed The New Fabulous Kangaroos (Denny Kass and Al Snow) before retiring completely from the wrestling business. Both Costello and his tag team partner Heffernan died before Kangaroos were honored as the first tag team to ever be inducted into the Professional Wrestling Hall of Fame in 2003, which started a tradition of inducting a new team every year.

== Early life ==
Costa was born in the village of Lingua, in the Italian island of Santa Marina Salina, Sicily, and lived there until his family immigrated to Australia when he was six years old. The family settled in Rockdale, New South Wales, where Costa helped out in his father's fruit store. He excelled at school sports and became interested in weightlifting at an early age. At age 16, Costa took up amateur boxing despite his father's wishes that he should become an opera singer. Costa was approached by Australian middleweight wrestling champion "Basher Bonas", who convinced him to try wrestling. Costa made his debut under an assumed name; his father still had hopes of him becoming an opera singer, and he did not want his parents to find out that he was wrestling. He came up with the name "Al Costello", thinking it sounded tough like a portmanteau of Al Capone and Frank Costello.

Costa's granddaughter is Brody Dalle, an Australian punk rock singer, songwriter, and musician best known for being the lead singer of The Distillers.

== Wrestling career ==
=== Early career ===
Al Costello made his professional wrestling debut in 1938, but the man that would be known as "The Man of a Thousand Holds" 20 years later, found little success early in his career. The general belief in Australian professional wrestling at the time was that a wrestler had to go to North America and learn how to be a pro before the bookers would even consider pushing them up the card. Costello travelled across Asia, where he did see some success; he won the Malaysian Heavyweight title in 1939, as well as the South Africa trophy in 1949. During the 1950s, Costello finally started to turn heads at home by winning the Australasian title. In 1952, Costello began wrestling in America, hoping to finally break through and make a big name of himself.

=== Fabulous Kangaroos ===
For years, Al Costello had been working on an idea for a new tag team; he even knew who he wanted for a partner: a wrestler he had worked with some years previously named Roy Heffernan. Because Costello and Heffernan had lost touch over the years, the idea remained dormant until Costello toured Hawaii in 1956. Costello mentioned his idea of an "Ultra Australian" tag team to fellow wrestler, and future promoter, Joe Blanchard. Blanchard happened to be a good friend of Roy Heffernan and knew he was working in Stampede Wrestling at the time. Blanchard put the two in touch with each other, and Costello was soon off to Calgary, Alberta, Canada to join Heffernan and finally make his tag team a reality. Costello and Heffernan debuted as "The Fabulous Kangaroos" on 3 May 1957 for Stu Hart's Stampede Wrestling promotion in a match against Maurice LaPointe and Tony Baillargeon. Only weeks after that first match, The Kangaroos were working with the top tag teams in the promotion.

After working in Stampede for a while, The Fabulous Kangaroos started to travel across the United States, headlining shows wherever they went due to their ability to rile up crowds with their heel (bad guy) tactics. On one occasion in August 1958, The Kangaroos, or "Kangaroo Men" as they were billed, nearly caused a riot in Madison Square Garden during a match against Antonino Rocca and Miguel Pérez; the fans began to throw fruit and stones at them. After the match ended without a decisive winner, the promoters stepped in, turned up the arena lights, and played the National Anthem to stop a potential riot. This was a common tactic used at the time by the New York promoters in order to prevent riots and help the heels leave the arena unharmed. Later that year, Costello and Heffernan started working for Dory Funk's NWA Western States promotion based in Amarillo, Texas. Here, The Kangaroos won their first title as a team when they defeated Pepper Gomez and El Medico to win the Texas version of the NWA World Tag Team Championship on 17 November 1958. Their first title reign was short lived, however, as Gomez and Rito Romero defeated them to regain the titles two weeks later.

Between 1957 and 1965, The Kangaroos wrestled in the United States, Canada, Asia and select tours of Australia and New Zealand. They worked for such companies as Capitol Wrestling Corporation (the future World Wrestling Entertainment), Championship Wrestling from Florida, NWA Ohio, the Japan Wrestling Association and the World Wrestling Association in Los Angeles, California.

The Kangaroos never forgot their roots and continued to work in Canada off and on through the years; in addition to Stampede Wrestling, the team also worked for NWA All-Star Wrestling based in Vancouver, British Columbia. Costello featured in a National Film Board of Canada short subject La Lotta/Wrestling/Le Catch. Their stint in NWA All-Star Wrestling was the last time Costello and Heffernan teamed together. In June 1965, The Kangaroos lost to Don Leo Jonathan and Jim Hardy and then split up. Heffernan had left Australia to tour the world in 1953 and wanted to return to his homeland, while Costello was determined to remain in the United States for a while longer.

=== Between Kangaroos ===
Heffernan returned to Australia and began working for World Championship Wrestling (the Australian version, not the North American wrestling federation) under booker Jim Barnett as a singles wrestler. Costello was originally supposed to return to Australia as well and work for WCW, but those plans never came through. Instead, Costello remained in the United States and kept working in the tag team division, never seeking a career as a singles wrestler. Costello began wrestling for Georgia Championship Wrestling, where he teamed up with Louis Tillet to form a tag team known as "The Globetrotters"; a name that played off Costello's Australian and Tillet's French heritage. The Globetrotters defeated the Mysterious Medics in the finals of the Georgia NWA World Tag Team Championship but only held the titles for a week before losing them to Kurt and Karl Von Brauner on 4 February 1966. After this, the Globetrotters broke up due to differences in their approach to tag teaming.

Costello then moved to the NWA Mid-America territory near Nashville, Tennessee. In Mid-American, Costello teamed with Herb Welch to win the Mid-American version of the NWA World Tag Team Championship, which they held for just over 2 months. While still working in Mid-America, Costello began to team with Karl Von Brauner, who used a "German Nazi" gimmick despite being American. Under the management of "Playboy" Gary Hart, Costello and Von Brauner were billed as "The Internationals"; the team was later managed by George "Crybaby" Cannon. The Internationals worked mainly in Tennessee and Texas for NWA Western States. In Texas, Costello and Von Brauner won the Texas version of the NWA World Tag Team Championship, a title Costello and Heffernan had held in 1958. The team was also billed as the first NWA American Tag Team Champions, titles that were also recognized by World Class Championship Wrestling in addition to the Western States promotion. The Internationals lost the American Tag Team title to Fritz and Waldo Von Erich on 21 February 1967. Kurt then decided to go back to teaming with his storyline brother, Karl Von Brauner.

After the Internationals broke up, Costello returned to Australia to visit friends and relatives and to recuperate after many years on the road. On his way back to the United States, Costello had a stopover in Detroit, Michigan, where he met Cleo Williams. The two fell in love and married shortly afterwards, remaining together for the rest of Costello's life.

=== Kangaroos once more ===
In 1967, Al Costello reformed The Fabulous Kangaroos, this time teaming up with Ray St. Clair. The team had been touring non-stop for about six months when St. Clair was forced to retire due to knee problems. A few months after St. Clair retired, Costello found a new man to don the bush hat: Don Kent. Kent, who was from Michigan, adopted the Ultra-Australian gimmick (but retained his American accent) and the two formed the third overall and second most well-known version of The Fabulous Kangaroos. Costello and Kent teamed together on a regular basis from 1968 until 1974, approximately the same amount of time that Costello spent teaming with his original partner, Roy Heffernan. Costello and Kent continued in a tradition that was reminiscent of the original Kangaroos; when a federation needed a new tag team title, The Kangaroos were brought in and acknowledged as champions upon arrival instead of holding a tournament to determine the champions. In 1967, the Japanese federation "International Wrestling Enterprise" (IWE) brought The Kangaroos in as the first Trans-World Wrestling Alliance World Tag Team Champions. They held this title until 10 January 1968 when IWE mainstays Toyonobori and Thunder Sugiyama beat them for the gold. Over the years, many more title reigns came from various promotions all over the globe. In Canada, The Kangaroos were the first Eastern Sports Association International Tag Team Champions. In the World Wrestling Association of Indianapolis, they held the WWA World Tag Team Championship twice. In addition to winning titles all over North America, Costello and Kent also made appearances for the World Wide Wrestling Federation (now known as WWE) from 1971 to 1972.

The Kangaroos frequented NWA Detroit, where they held the Detroit version of the NWA World Tag Team Championship for most of 1971. By the end of 1972, The Kangaroos began working for Nick Gulas' NWA Mid-America. In Mid-America, they held the local version of the NWA World Tag Team Championship, the Mid-America version, on three occasions.

In 1974, after a match at Cincinnati Gardens, an enraged fan took a fire extinguisher off the wall and threw it at Costello and Kent from the balcony of the Gardens. The extinguisher hit Costello in the hip, damaging it so much that he needed hip replacement surgery later that year. The fan was arrested, served 15 days in jail, and fined fifty dollars for damaging the fire extinguisher. The hip injury left Costello unable to wrestle, and The Fabulous Kangaroos split up once again. Costello had a full hip replacement and was forced to retire from active competition.

=== Managing ===
In 1975, Costello surprised everyone by returning to professional wrestling as the manager of the team known as "The Love Brothers" (Hartford and Reggie Love). He actually stepped into the ring on occasion as part of special six-man tag team matches.

After recovering from his hip surgery, Costello returned to active competition at age 56. The fact that he was able to recover from such a major injury is credited to his almost-fanatical style of healthy living. As a devout vegan, Costello credited his meat-free diet with his recovery, as well as the remarkable shape he was in for a man of his age.

Costello reformed The Fabulous Kangaroos once more, this time teaming up with wrestler Tony Charles. The team defeated Dominic DeNucci and Chris Markoff to win Detroit's version of the NWA World Tag Team title, the same title that Costello and Kent had previously held. The Kangaroos title run was short, however, and they lost their gold to "Crazy" Luke Graham and Ripper Collins.

In 1977, Tony Charles was replaced by Don Kent and the two reunited for a tour of Puerto Rico with the World Wrestling Council (WWC). In Puerto Rico, The Kangaroos arrived billed as the WWC World Tag Team Champions, once more to give a newly created title legitimacy. They dropped the titles to Carlos Colón and Jose Rivera on 12 March 1977 and remained in the WWC until 1978 chasing, but never regaining, the WWC World Tag Team Championship. After their tour in Puerto Rico ended, Don Kent returned to singles wrestling, and Costello refocused on managing.

=== Still a Kangaroo ===
In 1981, Costello convinced Kent to once again don the bush hat and pick up the boomerang. Costello got Kent to team up with Bruno Bekkar, who was mostly known from working in his native New Zealand and Australia. Kent and Bekkar worked a tour for the WWC, while Costello served as their manager. The team won the WWC North American Tag Team titles from Jack and Jerry Brisco on 22 October 1981. They then lost the titles to Invader I and Super Gladiator but quickly gained them back before dropping the titles for good to Invader and Gladiator on 26 January 1982. The Kent and Bekkar team only lasted through one tour of the Caribbean, after which Bruno Bekkar returned to Australia and New Zealand to work for the local promotions there.

Bekkar was replaced with Johnny Heffernan (Canadian wrestler Bob Della Serra), a storyline cousin of Roy Heffernan, for what was the final version of The Fabulous Kangaroos. The team ended Terry and Dory Funk Jr.'s year and a half run with the WWC World Tag Team championship on 1 May 1982. Kent and Heffernan held the gold for less than two months before losing the WWC World Tag Team titles to Invader I and Pierre Martel. After a tour in Puerto Rico, Costello, Kent and Heffernan returned to work for Championship Wrestling from Florida (CWF), a promotion The Kangaroos last worked for in 1962. In Florida, The Kangaroos won the NWA Florida Global Tag Team Championship four times. The final storyline involving The Fabulous Kangaroos saw Al Costello bring in J. J. Dillon to act as his short-term replacement while he was "away on business". When Costello returned from his business trip, Dillon kayfabe refused to give up The Kangaroos' contracts and was backed up by both Kent and Heffernan. This angle was designed to write Al Costello out of The Fabulous Kangaroos' storyline and allow him to retire from wrestling altogether. Not long after Costello retired, Kent and Johnny Heffernan went their separate ways.

=== Retirement ===
After retiring from wrestling, Al Costello became the head of security at College Harbor, Florida. In 1992, at the age of 71, Costello retired from his job in Florida and began teaching wrestling. He also started to manage The New Fabulous Kangaroos in 1993, a team consisting of Mickey Doyle and Denny Kass who worked for "Motor City Wrestling" (MCW). By the fall of 1993, Mickey Doyle had been replaced by a young wrestler by the name of Al Snow; with Costello's help The New Fabulous Kangaroos defeated "Canadian Lighting" (Otis Apollo and "Irish" Bobby Clancy), on 29 December 1993, to win the MCW Tag Team Championship. On 14 May 1994, Kass and Snow defeated Canadian Lighting again to win the Border City Wrestling (BCW) Can-Am Tag Team Championship, unifying the two tag team championships. A week later, The New Fabulous Kangaroos lost both sets of titles to Scott D'Amore and "Irish" Bobby Clancy. After losing the unified MCW/BCW Tag Team championships, The New Kangaroos split up; Snow focused on his World Wrestling Federation career while Costello retired for good, never making another wrestling related appearance.

=== Death ===
On 22 January 2000, Costello died from a combination of pneumonia and heart problems, in Clearwater, Florida. In 2003, Al Costello and Roy Heffernan became the first tag team to ever be inducted into the Professional Wrestling Hall of Fame. Since that time, the Hall of Fame has honored other tag teams, but The Fabulous Kangaroos were given the honor of being the first. In the tradition of the Kangaroos, they were "billed as champions on arrival" one last time.

== Championships and accomplishments ==
  - Australasian Heavyweight Championship (1 time)
- Alex Turk Promotions (Winnipeg)
  - International Tag Team Championship (2 times) - with Roy Heffernan
- Capitol Wrestling Corporation
  - NWA United States Tag Team Championship (Northeast version) (3 times) - with Roy Heffernan
- Cauliflower Alley Club
  - Other honoree (1994)
- Championship Wrestling from Florida
  - NWA United States Tag Team Championship (Florida version) (1 time) - with Roy Heffernan
  - NWA World Tag Team Championship (Florida version)(1 time) - with Roy Heffernan
- Eastern Sports Association
  - ESA International Tag Team Championship (1 time) - with Don Kent
- Georgia Championship Wrestling
  - NWA World Tag Team Championship (Georgia version) 1 time – with Louie Tillet
- International Wrestling Enterprise
  - Trans-World Wrestling Alliance World Tag Team Championship (1 time) - with Don Kent
- Japan Wrestling Association
  - NWA International Tag Team Championship (1 time) - with Roy Heffernan
- Midwest Wrestling Association
  - NWA United States Tag Team Championship (Ohio version) (1 time) - with Roy Heffernan
- Mike London Promotions
  - Rocky Mountain Tag Team Championship (1 time) - with Roy Heffernan
- National Wrestling Alliance
  - NWA Hall of Fame (Class of 2013)
- NWA All-Star Wrestling
  - NWA Canadian Tag Team Championship (Vancouver version) (4 times) - with Roy Heffernan
- NWA Big Time Wrestling
  - NWA American Tag Team Championship (1 time) - with Karl Von Brauner
  - NWA World Tag Team Championship (Texas version) (2 times) - with Roy Heffernan (1), Karl Von Brauner (1)
- NWA Detroit
  - NWA World Tag Team Championship (Detroit version) (3 times) - with Roy Heffernan (2), Ray St. Clair (1)
- NWA Mid-America
  - NWA Southern Junior Heavyweight Championship (1 time)
  - NWA World Tag Team Championship (Mid-America version) 4 times) - with Don Kent (3), Herb Welch (1)
- New Zealand Wrestling Union
  - NWA Australasian Heavyweight Championship (1 time)
- Professional Wrestling Hall of Fame
  - Class of 2003 - with Roy Heffernan
- Western States Sports
  - NWA International Tag Team Championship (Texas version) (1 time) - with Roy Heffernan^{A}
  - NWA World Tag Team Championship (Amarillo version) (1 time) - with Roy Heffernan
- World Wrestling Association
  - WWA World Tag Team Championship (2 times) - with Don Kent
- Worldwide Wrestling Associates
  - WWA World Tag Team Championship (1 time) - with Roy Heffernan
  - WWA International Television Tag Team Championship (2 times) - with Roy Heffernan
- World Wrestling Council
  - WWC World Tag Team Championship (1 time) - with Don Kent
- Wrestling Observer Newsletter
  - Wrestling Observer Newsletter Hall of Fame (Class of 1996) with Roy Heffernan and Don Kent
