= ESA International Tag Team Championship =

Professional wrestling tag team championship

Eastern Sports Association's International Tag Team Title was represented by a Trophy, and was defended in the Maritimes from 1969 to 1975.

== International Tag Team Champions ==
Key
No.	Overall reign number
Reign	Reign number for the specific team—reign numbers for the individuals are in parentheses, if different
Days	Number of days held

No.	Champion	Championship change			Reign statistics		Notes	Ref.
No.	Champion	Date	Event	Location	Reign	Days	Notes	Ref.
1	The Fabulous Kangaroos (Al Costello and Don Kent)	1969	ESN show	N/A	1	N/A		
2	The Beast and Rudy Kay	August 5, 1969	ESN show	N/A	1	N/A		
—		N/A	—	—				
4	Eric Pomeroy and Phil Robley	June 2, 1970	ESN show	N/A	1	N/A		
5	Leo Burke and The Beast	N/A	ESN show	N/A	1	N/A		
6	Eric Pomeroy and Fred Sweetan	August 3, 1971	ESN show	N/A	1	28		
7	Archie Gouldie and The Beast	August 31, 1971	ESN show	N/A	1	35		
8	Eric Pomeroy and Fred Sweetan	October 5, 1971	ESN show	N/A	2	7		
9	The Beast and Rudy Kay	October 12, 1971	ESN show	Halifax, Nova Scotia	2	217		
10	Mike Dubois and Fred Sweetan	May 16, 1972	ESN show	N/A	1	84		
11	Leo Burke and Bobby Kay	August 8, 1972	ESN show	Halifax, Nova Scotia	1	308		
12	Fred Sweetan and Kurt von Steiger	June 12, 1973	ESN show	N/A	1	N/A		
13	The Beast and Bobby Kay	July 1973	ESN show	N/A	2	N/A		
14	Fred Sweetan and Mr. X	August 3, 1973	ESN show	N/A	1	N/A		
15	The Beast and Bobby Kay	August 1973	ESN show	N/A	3	N/A		
16	J. J. Dillon and Fred Sweetan	September 1973	ESN show	N/A		N/A		
—	Vacated	N/A	—	—	—	—	Dillon did not return for the start of the season.	
17	Fred Sweetan and Mike Dubois	May 7, 1974	ESN show	Halifax, Nova Scotia	1	N/A	Defeated Beast and Bobby Kay for the vacant title.	
18	Leo Burke and The Beast	July 1974	ESN show	N/A	1	N/A		
19		August 1974	ESN show	N/A	1	N/A		
20	The Beast and The Stomper	October 1974	ESN show	N/A		N/A		
—	Vacated	N/A	—	—	—	—	The Stomper did not return for the start of the season.	
21	Mike Dubois and Alfred Hayes	May 13, 1975	ESN show	Halifax, Nova Scotia	1	N/A	Defeated Beast and Johnny Weaver for the vacant title.	
—	Vacated	September 1975	—	—	—	—	Dubois and Hayes stripped for failure to defend.	
22	Bob Brown and the Patriot	September 1975	ESN show	N/A	1	N/A	Won a three team tournament.	
23	The Beast and Rudy Kay	October 28, 1975	ESN show	Halifax, Nova Scotia	3	N/A		
—	Deactivated	N/A	—	—	—	—		

On ESA's 1976 programs, the promotion listed Jack and Jerry Brisco as International Tag Champions, even though they never appeared in the Maritimes as a team. The title had been replaced with the Maritime Tag Team Championship Belts.

== International Heavyweight Champion ==
Key
No.	Overall reign number
Reign	Reign number for the specific champion
Days	Number of days held

No.	Champion	Championship change			Reign statistics		Notes	Ref.
No.	Champion	Date	Event	Location	Reign	Days	Notes	Ref.
1	J. J. Dillon	May 1984	N/A	N/A	1	N/A	Arrived as Champion - only Champion - left promotion circa August, 1984	

== Global Tag Team Champions ==
Key
No.	Overall reign number
Reign	Reign number for the specific team—reign numbers for the individuals are in parentheses, if different
Days	Number of days held

No.	Champion	Championship change			Reign statistics		Notes	Ref.
No.	Champion	Date	Event	Location	Reign	Days	Notes	Ref.
1	The Samoans (Great Tio and Chief Tapu)	May 1984	N/A	N/A	1	N/A	Arrived as Champions.	
	Rudy Kay and Hubert Gallant	N/A	N/A		1	N/A	N/A	
3	The Samoans (Great Tio and Chief Tapu)	N/A	N/A	N/A	2	N/A		

== World Tag Team Champions ==
Key
No.	Overall reign number
Reign	Reign number for the specific team—reign numbers for the individuals are in parentheses, if different
Days	Number of days held

No.	Champion	Championship change			Reign statistics		Notes	Ref.
No.	Champion	Date	Event	Location	Reign	Days	Notes	Ref.
1	Dennis Condrey and Phil Hickerson	July 1977	N/A	N/A	1	N/A	Arrived as Champions. Stripped of the title for failure to defend	
