= Bob Brown (wrestler) =

Canadian professional wrestler (1938 – 1997)

Bulldog Bob Brown
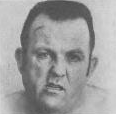
- Brown, c. 1982

Personal information
- Born: Robert Harold Brown; October 16, 1938 Shoal Lake, Manitoba, Canada
- Died: February 5, 1997 (aged 58) Kansas City, Missouri, U.S.
- Children: 1
- Family: David Brown (son); Doug Brown (brother); Kerry Brown (nephew)

Professional wrestling career
- Ring name(s): Bob Brown; Bill Green; Butch Kelly
- Billed height: 6 ft 1 in (1.85 m)
- Billed weight: 244 lb (111 kg)
- Billed from: Kansas City, Missouri
- Trained by: Verne Gagne; Bronko Nagurski
- Debut: 1956
- Retired: 1996

Robert Harold Brown (October 16, 1938 – February 5, 1997) was a Canadian professional wrestler, better known by his ring name "Bulldog" Bob Brown.

== Early life ==
Brown was born in Shoal Lake, Manitoba, but grew up in the St. James-Assiniboia area of Winnipeg. He was given the nickname "Bulldog" in grade school and worked as a police officer before becoming a professional wrestler.

== Professional wrestling career ==
Having worked as a policeman in Manitoba, Brown also played hockey. He started wrestling in the late 50s, working in places like Manitoba, Prince Edward Island, Nova Scotia, New Brunswick and Alberta. From 1969 to 1974 and in the early 1980s, Brown wrestled for NWA All Star Wrestling in Vancouver and formed tag teams with Gene Kiniski and John Quinn. In Atlantic Grand Prix Wrestling in the Maritime Provinces of Eastern Canada in the mid-1970s, he fought the likes of Leo Burke and Stephen Petitpas. He worked as a face for ten years in Kansas City before turning heel in late 1985. In interviews, he often argued about the events that had happened by turning the facts around. Brown fought with many big names throughout his career including Harley Race and Bill Dundee. Brown was a part of the WrestleRock event on April 20, 1986, where he was defeated by Giant Baba.

He found his greatest success while wrestling for NWA Central States. On June 14, 1968, Brown won a tournament for his first reign with the NWA Central States Heavyweight Championship, and held it a total of 19 times. Brown also held the NWA Central States Tag Team Championship 12 times with many partners. He often worked as booker for the Central States and several other promotions. Brown even wrestled for the World Wrestling Council in Puerto Rico, forming a tag team with Dale Veasey known as the Hunters. They won the WWC World Tag Team Championship from Mark and Chris Youngblood on August 26, 1987, before dropping the titles back to the Youngbloods on September 20.

Brown also wrestled for Stampede Wrestling with Kerry Brown, who was billed as Brown's son, but was actually his nephew. On June 9, 1989, the Browns won the Stampede International Tag Team Championship from Chris Benoit and Biff Wellington. That same year, Brown began working as the color commentator for Stampede's television show, alongside Ed Whalen.

== Personal life and death ==
Brown's brother Doug is a wrestling promoter, and his son David worked as a professional wrestling referee under the name David Puttnam. Brown was the uncle of Kerry Brown, who was a professional wrestler.

In 1996, Brown suffered a heart attack, and was pronounced dead twice before being revived, causing his retirement from in-ring competition. Following his retirement, he worked as a security guard at a horse and dog racing track in Kansas City, and the formerly named Flamingo Casino, now known as Isle of Capri Casino in Kansas City, Missouri.

Brown died of a heart attack while working at the casino on February 5, 1997, at the age of 58.

== Championships and accomplishments ==
- Atlantic Grand Prix Wrestling
  - AGPW North American Tag Team Championship (3 times) – with Great Pogo Langie (1), Rick Valentine (1), and Masa Chono (1)
- Central States Wrestling
  - NWA Central States Heavyweight Championship (19 times)
  - NWA Central States Tag Team Championship (12 times) – with Gama Singh (1), Dick Murdoch (1), Pat O'Connor (1), Rufus R. Jones (1), Terry Taylor (1), Buzz Tyler (3), Marty Jannetty (1), Mitsuo Hata (2), and the Cuban Assassin (1)
  - NWA North American Tag Team Championship (Central States version) (5 times) – with Bob Geigel
  - NWA United States Heavyweight Championship (Central States version) (1 time)
  - NWA World Tag Team Championship (Central States version) (3 times) – with Al Hayes (1), Alexis Smirnoff (1), and Bob Sweetan (1)
  - NWA Heart of America Championship (1 time)
  - NWA Iowa Tag Team Championship (1 time) - with Ripper Jack Daniels
- Eastern Sports Association
  - ESA International Tag Team Championship (1 time) – with The Patriot
  - ESA North American Heavyweight Championship (1 time)
- Madison Wrestling Club
  - MWC Heavyweight Championship (7 times)
  - MWC Tag Team Championship (4 times) – with John DePaulo (1), Bill Kochen (2), and Lorne Corlett (1)
- NWA All-Star Wrestling
  - NWA Canadian Tag Team Championship (Vancouver version) (8 times) – with Dutch Savage (2), John Quinn (3), Gene Kiniski (2), and Al Tomko (1)
  - NWA International Tag Team Championship (Vancouver version) (1 time) – with Buzz Tyler
  - NWA Pacific Coast Heavyweight Championship (Vancouver version) (3 times)
- Stampede Wrestling
  - NWA International Tag Team Championship (Calgary version) (1 time) – with Kerry Brown
- World Wrestling Council
  - WWC World Tag Team Championship (1 time) - with Dale Veasey
  - WWC North American Tag Team Championship (1 time) - with Dale Veasey
- West Four Wrestling Alliance
  - WFWA Canadian Heavyweight Championship (1 time)
