= J. J. Dillon =

American professional wrestler and manager

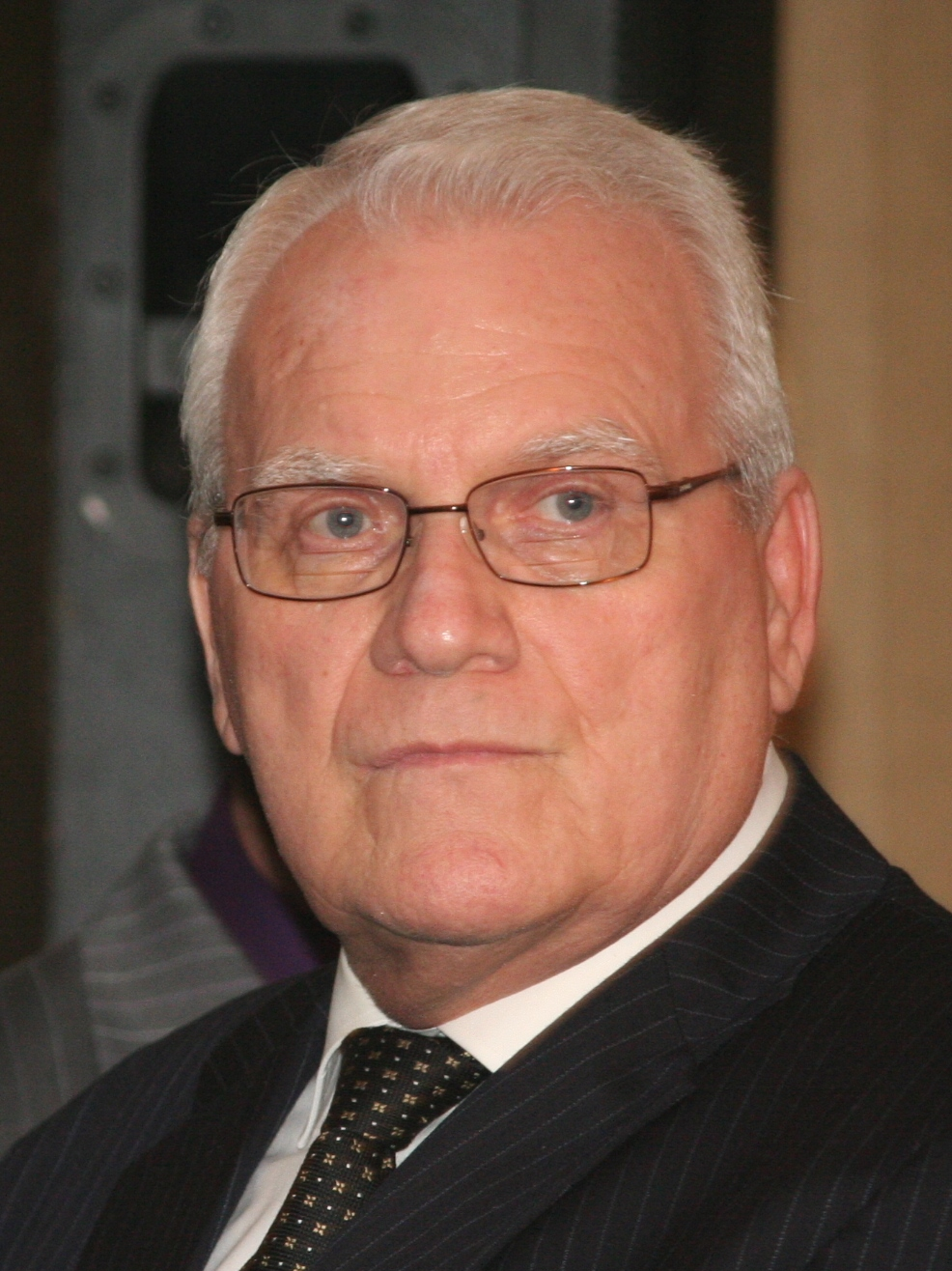
- Dillon in 2014

Personal information
- Born: James Morrison; June 26, 1942 (age 84) Trenton, New Jersey, U.S.

Professional wrestling career
- Ring name(s): J. J. Dillon; James J. Dillon; Jo Jo Dillon; Jim Dillon; Jim Valence
- Billed height: 6 ft 0 in (1.83 m)
- Billed weight: 238 lb (108 kg)
- Trained by: Eddie Graham
- Debut: July 11, 1962
- Retired: May 3, 2009

James Morrison (born June 26, 1942) is an American retired professional wrestler and manager, better known by his ring name, J. J. Dillon.

== Professional wrestling career ==
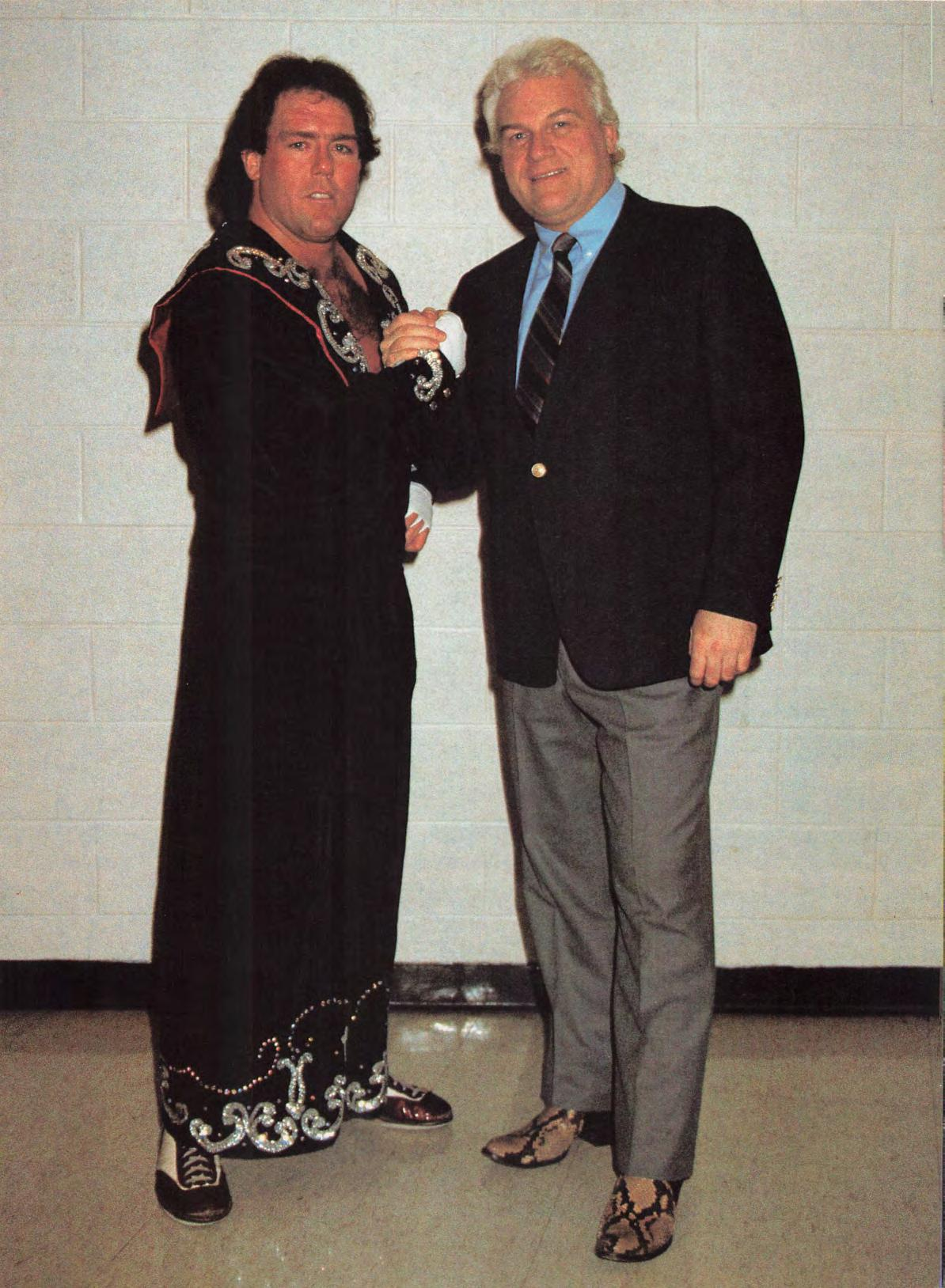
Dillon alongside Tully Blanchard, c. 1986

J. J. Dillon had an extensive wrestling career. He broke into wrestling at the age of 29, starting out in the early 1970s as a referee before transitioning into a wrestler and then a manager, while winning many championships and managing a variety of wrestlers throughout many different territories around the country. He made his Madison Square Garden debut on April 23, 1984, when he challenged Tito Santana for the WWF Intercontinental Heavyweight Championship, losing by pinfall after a flying forearm by Santana. Dillon is most remembered in pro wrestling as a manager. He guided many wrestlers to singles and tag team titles in the NWA. Dillon, who became manager of Tully Blanchard, achieved his greatest success as the manager of the Four Horsemen which consisted of "Nature Boy" Ric Flair, Blanchard, Arn Anderson, Ole Anderson, Lex Luger and Barry Windham. After leaving WCW in February 1989, he was a front office executive for the WWF until 1997. On April 21, 1997, he returned to WCW as an on-camera commissioner, a position which lasted until fall 1998. He returned to this role in 1999 before his final departure. In 2003, he had a short stint as an NWA representative in TNA.

In 2009, Dillon made a one-night appearance at Deaf Wrestlefest 2009 to team with "Beef Stew" Lou Marconi and "Handsome" Frank Staletto in a six-man tag team match against "Franchise" Shane Douglas, Dominic DeNucci and Cody Michaels.

On December 29, 2019, Dillon joined the Board of Directors of the International Pro Wrestling Hall of Fame. On March 3, 2021, he returned to TNT to act as manager for Tully Blanchard on an episode of AEW Dynamite. In 2022, he appeared on Judge Steve Harvey with wrestler Kevin Sullivan.

== Championships and accomplishments ==
- Cauliflower Alley Club
  - Other inductee (2007)
- Central States Wrestling
  - NWA Central States Tag Team Championship (1 time) – with Buzz Tyler
- Championship Wrestling from Florida
  - NWA Florida Heavyweight Championship (1 time)
  - NWA Florida Tag Team Championship (1 time) - with Roger Kirby
  - NWA Florida Television Championship (1 time)
- Eastern Sports Association
  - ESA International Heavyweight Championship (1 time)
  - ESA International Tag Team Championship (1 time) - with Freddie Sweetan
  - ESA North American Heavyweight Championship (1 time)
- George Tragos/Lou Thesz Professional Wrestling Hall of Fame
  - Lou Thesz Award (2016)
- National Wrestling Alliance
  - NWA Hall of Fame (class of 2014)
- NWA Western States Sports
  - NWA International Heavyweight Championship (Amarillo version) (1 time)
  - NWA Western States Television Championship (1 time)
- Georgia Championship Wrestling
  - NWA Macon Heavyweight Championship (1 time)
- Professional Wrestling Hall of Fame
  - Class of 2013
- Pro Wrestling Illustrated
  - PWI Manager of the Year (1982, 1983, 1988)
- St. Louis Wrestling Hall of Fame
  - Class of 2023
- WWE
  - WWE Hall of Fame (Class of 2012) as a member of The Four Horsemen
- Other Titles
  - Fort Myers Heavyweight Championship ( 1 time )

== Books ==
- Dillon, James J.; Teal, Scott; Varriale, Philip (2005). Wrestlers are like seagulls : from McMahon to McMahon. Hendersonville, TN: Crowbar Press. ISBN 0-9745545-2-9. OCLC 62596130.
