= Archie Gouldie =

Canadian professional wrestler (1936-2016)

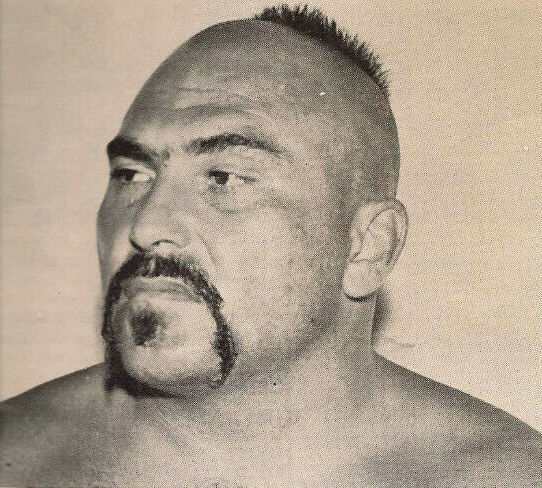

Personal information
- Born: Archibald Edward Gouldie; November 22, 1936 Carbon, Alberta, Canada
- Died: January 23, 2016 (aged 79) Knoxville, Tennessee, U.S.

Professional wrestling career
- Ring name(s): Archie Gouldie; The Masked Bounty Hunter; The Midnight Stallion; The Mongolian Stomper
- Billed height: 6 ft 1 in (185 cm)
- Billed weight: 260 lb (118 kg)
- Billed from: Mongolia
- Debut: November 2, 1962
- Retired: September 2, 1995

Archibald Edward Gouldie (November 22, 1936 – January 23, 2016) was a Canadian professional wrestler. He wrestled for Stampede Wrestling for decades as Archie "The Stomper" Gouldie, with the nickname coming from the wrestler's reputation of "stomping" on his opponents, when they were down, with his black cowboy boots. He was also known by the ring name The Mongolian Stomper.

== Professional wrestling career ==
=== Central States Wrestling (1962–1972) ===
Early in his career, Archie "The Stomper" Gouldie was a babyface (good guy) in the Central States territory. He won the NWA United States Heavyweight Championship (Central States Version) from Enrique Torres in St. Joseph on Dec. 20, 1963, losing it to Rocky Hamilton on Jan 31, 1964. He regained it on May 22, 1964, only to lose it to Sonny Myers June 12, 1964. He regained it yet again in 1965 from Sonny Myers, and dropped it to Bobby Shane in December in Waterloo, IA.

Archie won his first Central States Heavyweight Title from Ron Reed in St Joseph, MO. on June 4, 1965, holding it for 30 days, dropping it to Sonny Myers on July 4, 1965, in Kansas City, KS. Gouldie won the title for the second time on June 8, 1972, from Black Angus Campbell in St. Joseph, MO., only to lose it to Harley Race on July 7, 1972, in Kansas City, KS.

Archie also proved himself to be an accomplished tag team wrestler, winning the NWA North American Tag Team Championship eleven times. His first reign began May 1, 1962, with his last title run coming on October 14, 1972. The Stomper teamed up four times with The Viking, three times with Bob Geigel, twice with Rufus R. Jones, once with Danny Little Bear, and once with Bob Ellis for a total of approximately 238 days.

=== Stampede Wrestling (1968–1984) ===
Gouldie held the North American heavyweight title a record 14 times between 1968 and 1984, quite a streak of longevity for that time frame. He was also the first champion, defeating former NWA World Heavyweight Champion Pat O'Connor in the tournament finals. Gouldie feuded with British mat technician Billy Robinson, among others, for the title.

Although he wrestled as a heel during the majority of his Stampede tenure, Gouldie made a face turn late in 1983 after Bad News Allen turned against Gouldie and his storyline "son", Jeff, during a six-man tag team match and brutalized and injured Jeff (which led to Stampede TV host Ed Whalen to quit the company in protest); the attack led to a bloody feud which climaxed with Gouldie defeating Bad News for the Stampede North American title (his 14th, and what would be final, reign).

Gouldie never used the Mongolian Stomper gimmick while wrestling in Stampede; instead, staying true to his roots, he went with the gimmick of a tough Alberta cowboy as just "The Stomper" from Carbon, Alberta.

=== Southeast Championship Wrestling (1976–1983) ===
Gouldie achieved most of his U.S. fame in this territory, based in Knoxville, Tennessee. He held the NWA Southeast Heavyweight Championship a record eleven times between 1976 and 1981, winning it for the last time against Jerry Stubbs and losing it to Jos LeDuc. He feuded with Robert Fuller and Ronnie Garvin over the title.

=== Georgia Championship Wrestling (1980–1982) ===
Gouldie wrestled as the Mongolian Stomper in Georgia Championship Wrestling from 1980 to 1981.

=== Mid South Wrestling (Bill Watts) (1982) ===
Gouldie appeared very briefly in Mid South in late-1982, saving Skandor Akbar from an attack by Buck Robley. He only wrestled one or two matches before abruptly leaving the territory.

=== Southwest Championship Wrestling (1980s) ===
Gouldie wrestled as the Mongolian Stomper in Southwest Championship Wrestling in 1982. There he was managed by Don Carson and won the Southwest Heavyweight Championship. The Stomper feuded with Dick Slater, frequently using the "black glove" against opponents.

=== Smoky Mountain Wrestling (1992–1995) ===
In 1992 Gouldie joined SMW, which, like Southeast, was based in Knoxville, Tennessee. At this point in his career, the Stomper was considered a babyface, teaming with former rival Ronnie Garvin in his feud with Paul Orndorff and feuding with Kevin Sullivan's latest incarnation of evil wrestlers. Gouldie defeated Rob Morgan at the first Bluegrass Brawl in Pikeville, Ky. According to several magazines, Gouldie maintained his shape by riding his bicycle almost everywhere he went, sometimes riding up to 60 miles a day.

== Personal life ==
After his wrestling career came to an end, Gouldie served for several years as a deputy sheriff in Knox County, Tennessee, working as a correctional officer. Until his health began to fail him, he worked in the guard shack at a prison. Before that, he ran the paddy wagon for three years until he "got tired of hauling drunks."

In 2011, memory issues began.

== Death ==
On January 9, 2016, Gouldie fell and broke his hip, which required surgery. After the surgery, he never recovered and died in his sleep on January 23.

== Championships and accomplishments ==
- All-Star Championship Wrestling
  - ASCW Heavyweight Championship (2 times)
- Big Time Wrestling (San Francisco)
  - NWA World Tag Team Championship (San Francisco version) (1 time) – with Ciclon Negro
- Central States Wrestling
  - NWA Central States Brass Knuckles Championship(1 time)
  - NWA Central States Heavyweight Championship (2 times)
  - NWA United States Heavyweight Championship (Central States version) (3 times)
  - NWA North American Tag Team Championship (Central States version) (8 times) – with “Cowboy” Bob Ellis (1), Bob Geigel (3), Rufus R. Jones (2), The Viking (1), Danny Little Bear (1)
  - Iowa Tag Team Championship(1 time)- with The Alaskan
- Championship Wrestling from Florida
  - NWA Southern Heavyweight Championship (Florida version) (2 times)
- Georgia Championship Wrestling
  - NWA National Heavyweight Championship (1 time)
- International Wrestling
  - IW North American Heavyweight Championship (4 times)
- Memphis Wrestling Hall of Fame
  - Class of 2022
- NWA Detroit
  - NWA World Tag Team Championship (Detroit version) (2 times) – with Ben Justice (2)
- NWA Mid-America – Continental Wrestling Association
  - AWA Southern Heavyweight Championship (1 time)
  - AWA Southern Tag Team Championship (1 time) – with Jerry Lawler
  - CWA International Heavyweight Championship (1 time)
  - NWA Southern Heavyweight Championship (Memphis version) (1 time)
- Pro Wrestling Illustrated
  - PWI ranked him # 290 of the 500 best singles wrestlers during the PWI Years in 2003.
- Southeastern Championship Wrestling – Continental Wrestling Federation
  - CWF Tag Team Championship (1 time) – with Jimmy Golden
  - NWA Brass Knuckles Championship (Southeastern version) (3 times)
  - NWA Southeastern Heavyweight Championship (Northern Division) (11 times)
  - NWA Southeastern Heavyweight Championship (Southern Division) (1 time)
  - NWA Southeastern Tag Team Championship (2 times) – with Jimmy Golden (1) and Stomper Jr. (1)
  - NWA Southeastern Television Championship (1 time)
- Southern Championship Wrestling
  - NWA Southern Heavyweight Championship (Tennessee version) (1 time)
- Southern States Wrestling
  - SSW Heavyweight Championship (1 time)
- Southwest Championship Wrestling
  - SCW Southwest Heavyweight Championship (1 time)
- Stampede Wrestling
  - Stampede North American Heavyweight Championship (14 times)
  - Stampede Wrestling Hall of Fame (Class of 1995)
- Tennessee Mountain Wrestling
  - TMW Heavyweight Championship (2 times)
  - TMW Tag Team Championship (1 time) – with Chris Powers
- United Atlantic Championship Wrestling
  - UACW Heavyweight Championship (2 times)
  - UACW Tag Team Championship (1 time) – with Big Jesse
- USA Wrestling
  - USA Heavyweight Championship (3 times)
- World Wrestling Council
  - WWC Puerto Rico Heavyweight Championship (1 time)
