= Eric Pomeroy =

Canadian professional wrestler (1933 – 2012)

Personal information
- Born: Eric Ronald Pomeroy; June 12, 1933 St. John's, Newfoundland, Canada
- Died: September 29, 2012 (aged 79)} Stromsburg, Nebraska, U.S.

Professional wrestling career
- Ring name(s): Eric Pomeroy; Stan Pulaski; Stan Vachon; Inferno #2; Igor Kamiloff; Mad Russian; Destroyer
- Billed height: 6 ft 0 in (1.83 m)
- Billed weight: 242 lb (110 kg)
- Billed from: Soviet Union
- Debut: 1951
- Retired: 1976

Eric Pomeroy (June 12, 1933 - September 29, 2012) was a Canadian professional wrestler, better known by his ring name, Stan Pulaski and Stan Vachon. He competed in certain North American regional promotions including the National Wrestling Alliance as well as Grand Prix Wrestling, American Wrestling Association and Georgia Championship Wrestling during the 1960s and 1970s.

== Professional wrestling career ==
Pomeory started his career in 1951 in Toronto. He spent most of his early career in Canada and various National Wrestling Alliance territories. In 1964, he became Igor Kamiloff began teaming with Karol Kamiloff as the Kalmikoffs who were billed from Russia. The team didn't last, however, as Karol died from a fatal heart attack on September 12, 1964 in Salt Lake City after a match.

After Karol's death, Igor went on his own using the Russian gimmick. He was also known as the Mad Russian, Stan Pulaski and Sergei Pulaski working in Oklahoma, Calgary, Florida and Minnesota for the American Wrestling Association (AWA). Pulaski won the Nebraska Heavyweight Championship defeating Mighty Igor. He dropped the title to Mad Dog Vachon.

In 1967, he began teaming with Butcher Vachon, the brother of Mad Dog Vachon as Stan Vachon being billed as a brother of the Vachons. They won the tag team titles in Georgia four times feuding with the Torres Brothers (Enrique Torres and Ramon Torres) for over a year until the titles were discontinued in November 1968. In 1969, he continued working for the American Wrestling Association and Central States in Kansas City.

Then in 1970, he made his debut in Halifax, Nova Scotia for Eastern Sports Association. He won the ESA International Tag Team Championship four times with Buck Robley, The Beast and Freddie Sweetan twice during the early 1970s.

Pulaski made his only tour in Japan in 1973 as the Mad Russian for All Japan Pro Wrestling.

In 1974, he teamed with Inferno #1 and won the NWA Mid-America Southern Tag Team Champion three-times. At the end of 1974, Pulaski was in a car accident with injuries forcing him to retire from wrestling.

In 1976, he wrestled a few more matches for AWA and the Eastern Sports Association before retiring for good.

== Personal life ==
After wrestling he worked as a handyman at the Good Samaritan Home in Osceola, Nebraska for 20 years. He resided in Nebraska until his passing.

== Death ==
Pomeroy died on September 29, 2012, at 79.

== Championships and accomplishments ==
- American Wrestling Association
  - AWA Midwest Heavyweight Championship (6 times)
  - AWA Midwest Tag Team Championship (9 times) - with Dale Lewis (3), Chris Tolos (1), Cowboy Bob Ellis (1), and Reggie Parks (4)
  - Nebraska Heavyweight Championship (1 time)
- Central States Wrestling
  - NWA North American Tag Team Championship ( Central States Version ) ( 1 time ) - with Danny Little Bear
  - NWA United States Heavyweight Championship ( Central States Version ) ( 2 times )
- Eastern Sports Association
  - ESA International Tag Team Championship (4 times) - with Freddie Sweetan (2), Phil Robley (1), and The Beast (1)
- Mid-South Sports

- NWA Georgia Tag Team Championship (1 time) - with Paul Vachon
- NWA Southern Tag Team Championship (Georgia version) (3 times) - with Paul Vachon (3)

- Pacific Northwest Wrestling
  - NWA Pacific Northwest Heavyweight Championship (1 time)
  - NWA Pacific Northwest Tag Team Championship (1 time) - with Stan Stasiak (1 time)
