= Eastern Sports Association =

Canadian wrestling promotion

- Founded: 1969
- Headquarters: Halifax, Nova Scotia
- Founder(s): Al Zinck and Rudy Kay
- Owner(s): Al Zinck (1969-1975); Rudy Kay (1969-1975); Bobby Kay (1975-1976)
- Parent: National Wrestling Alliance (1975-1976)

The Eastern Sports Association, often referred to in the business simply as "the Maritimes," was a Canadian professional wrestling promotion based in Halifax, Nova Scotia. It ran during the spring and summer months from 1969 to 1976.

== History ==
The ESA, a member of the National Wrestling Alliance (1975–76), was owned by Al Zinck in partnership with Rudy Kay (1969–75) and Bobby Kay (1975-76) and promoted wrestling under the marquee name International Wrestling. In 1977, the ESA dissolved and Bobby Kay formed Trans-Canada Wrestling, and Al Zinck continued to promote International Wrestling under the name 'Maritime International Sports Ltd' with George Cannon and later Don Carson as bookers. At the end of the 1977 season, Al Zinck retired from promoting until 1984, when he reactivated International Wrestling with J. J. Dillon as booker.

They ran cards seven nights a week across Nova Scotia and New Brunswick. The nightly cards were almost identical for the week, so they could be promoted by one TV show. The week would start Saturday nights in New Glasgow, with their main stop at the Halifax Forum every Tuesday night, followed by a TV taping on Wednesday morning at the CJCH-TV studios on Robie Street in Halifax. This show would be broadcast across the Maritimes on Saturdays on the ATV network. Host Clary Fleming would announce the matches, do the play by play and interview the wrestlers. Eight events a week, including the TV show, was a heavy schedule, but it was for only about six months a year (May–October). In the winter months, hockey dominated arena bookings, and poor driving conditions on the roads could keep fans home and make it difficult for the wrestlers to travel from town to town on schedule. The first card of each new wrestling season would feature a Battle Royal.

The Cormier brothers (Rudy Kay, Bobby Kay, Leo Burke and The Beast) were the top faces, along with Johnny Weaver (1975) and Tommy Gilbert (1976-77). The top heels were Freddie Sweetan, Mike Dubois, Killer Karl Krupp, Jim Dillon, "Bulldog" Bob Brown, Lord Alfred Hayes, The Brute, Bolo & Geeto Mongol and The Mercenaries. The Stomper and Eric Pomeroy were heels who turned face.

Future stars Rick Martel, Roddy Piper, Tony Atlas, Rocky Johnson and Terry Gordy also paid their dues here. As well, former world champions Pat O'Connor, Harley Race, Dory Funk Jr. and Lou Thesz made appearances. Jack Brisco, Terry Funk and Rick Martel defended their World titles under the banner of International Wrestling.

== Championships ==
Title notes	Last champion(s)
IW North American Heavyweight Championship (1969-77 & 1984)	Leo Burke
International Tag Team Championship (represented by a trophy) (1969–76)	Jack & Jerry Brisco
Canadian Heavyweight Championship (1977)	David Schultz
World Tag Team Championship (1977)	Dennis Condry & Phil Hickerson
Maritime Heavyweight Championship (1976–77)	Leo Burke
Maritime Tag Team Championship (1976–77)	Leo Burke & Hubert Gallant
Taped Fist Championship (1973–77)	Rudy Kay
International Heavyweight Championship (1984)	J. J. Dillon
Global Tag Team Championship (1984)	Samoans(Tio and Tapu)
