= List of former Central States Wrestling personnel =

Central States Wrestling was a professional wrestling promotion based in Kansas City, Missouri from 1948 to 1988. Former employees in NWA Central States consisted of professional wrestlers, managers, play-by-play and color commentators, announcers, interviewers and referees.

== Male Wrestlers ==
Birth Name	Ring name(s)	Tenure	Notes
Ángel Acevedo	The Cuban Assassin	1984; 1987–1988	
Kenneth Ackles^{†}	Kenny Ackles	1953	
Gabriel Acocella^{†}	Jack Britton	1950–1952	
Katsuji Adachi^{†}	Tokyo Joe	1973–1974	
Chris Adams^{†}	Chris Adams	1984	
Shelby Adcock^{†}	Kentucky Hillbilly Adcock	1963	
Charles Adcox^{†}	Chuck Adcox	1968–1969; 1972	
David Adkisson^{†}	David Von Erich	1978; 1980–1984	
Jack Adkisson^{†}	Fritz Von Erich	1959; 1964; 1967	
Kerry Adkisson^{†}	Kerry Von Erich	1980; 1982–1985	
Kevin Adkisson	Kevin Von Erich	1978; 1980; 1984–1985	
Joseph Adelman^{†}	Joe Adelman	1948–1957	
William Afflis^{†}	Dick the Bruiser	1958–1959; 1963–1965; 1967–1971; 1975–1985	
Roy Lee Albern^{†}	Ripper Collins	1976	
Edward Albers	Mr. Kleen	1961	
Bob Alebi	Bulldog Drummer / Don Drummer	1970; 1973	
Albert Alexinis^{†}	Ivan Gorky	1962	
Terry Allen	Magnum T. A.	1985–1986	
Randall Alls	Randy Alls	1978–1979	
Jack Altinger^{†}	Jack Allen	1963	
Alberto Amessa	Tony Romano / Pedro Amessa	1969–1970	
Thomas Andersen^{†}	Tom Andrews / Super Intern / Intern #2	1971; 1974–1984	
Gene Anderson^{†}	Gene Anderson	1964–1965; 1978	
Leonard Anderson^{†}	Leo Numa	1953	
Arthur Anoaʻi Sr.	Afa	1978	
Leati Anoaʻi	Sika	1978	
Darrell Anthony	Grappler #2	1984	
Ferris Anthony	Earthquake Ferris	1986–1987	
Orest Antonation	Bill Cody	1983	
Victor Arko	Mike Kelly	1981	
William Arko^{†}	Pat Kelly	1980–1981; 1984	
Jerry Arotski^{†}	Jerry Ho / Jerry O	1983	
Ovila Asselin^{†}	Guy LaRose	1961–1962	
Edouard Auger^{†}	Pierre LaSalle	1962	
James Ault^{†}	The Great Mephisto / Frankie Cain	1971	
Anthony Aurelio^{†}	Prince Nero / Tony Nero	1961; 1964	
Vincenzo Austeri^{†}	Jim Austeri / Tony Austeri	1956–1957	
Shohei Baba^{†}	Giant Baba	1975; 1977; 1982–1983; 1986	
Robert Backlund	Bob Backlund	1976; 1985	
Vince Bagala^{†}	Vince Montana	1964	
Douglas Baker^{†}	Ox Baker / The Ox	1964–1969; 1971–1972; 1976; 1983–1984; 1987	
Jean Baillargeon^{†}	Jean Baillargeon	1953	
Víctor Barajas	Black Gordman	1976	
Mike Barber^{†}	Armand Hussein	1961; 1964	
Roger Barnes	Ronnie Garvin	1984; 1986	
Ferrin Barr, Jr.	Jesse Barr	1980	
Patrick Barrett	Paddy Barrett	1964	
Roland Barriault	Frenchy Lamonte / Frenchy Simard / Marcel Semard	1961; 1973	
Ralph Bartleman^{†}	Ralph Bartleman	1956–1957; 1960; 1962	
Ellis Bashara^{†}	Ellis Bashara	1950	
Rolland Bastien^{†}	Red Bastien	1962; 1975–1976	
Bart Batten	Bart Batten	1985–1987	
Brad Batten^{†}	Brad Batten	1985–1987	
Robert Baxter^{†}	Laverne Baxter	1951	
George Becker^{†}	George Becker	1948; 1952	
Don Beitelman^{†}	Don Curtis	1958	
Christos Belkas^{†}	Chris Belkas	1956; 1963; 1965–1966	
Carl Bell^{†}	Don Eagle	1948–1949	
Kay Bell^{†}	Kay Bell	1953	
Joseph Benincasa^{†}	Joe Benecassa	1950–1951	
Barney Bernard^{†}	Barney Bernard / Chest Bernard	1948–1951; 1954; 1957	
Ralph Berry^{†}	Wild Red Berry	1952–1957; 1959	
Herbert Betsinger^{†}	Jack McDonald / Oregon McDonald	1949–1950	
Dick Beyer^{†}	The Destroyer / Dr. X	1973; 1975	
Antonino Biasetton^{†}	Antonino Rocca / Argentina Rocca	1948; 1950; 1954–1955; 1957; 1959; 1968	
Vince Billotto	Vinnie Valentino	1987–1988	
Frank Earl Black	Blackjack Black	1972	
Eugene Blackley^{†}	Gene Blackley	1949	
Jerry Blackwell^{†}	Crusher Blackwell / Jerry Blackwell	1977–1978; 1980; 1982–1986	
B. Brian Blair	Brian Blair	1978	
Al Blake	Vladimir Petrov	1987	
Joe Blanchard^{†}	Joe Blanchard	1954; 1970	
Tully Blanchard	Tully Blanchard / The Black Stallion / The Midnight Stallion	1983–1986	
Frederick Blassie^{†}	Fred Blassie	1948–1950; 1952	
Nick Bockwinkel^{†}	Nick Bockwinkel	1984; 1986–1987	
Warren Bockwinkel^{†}	Warren Bockwinkel	1948–1951; 1954	
Aldo Bogni^{†}	Aldo Bogni	1955–1956	
Maurice Boissy^{†}	Maurice Roberre	1952–1955	
George Bollas^{†}	George Bollas	1970	
Terry Bollea	Hulk Hogan	1983	
Steve Bolus^{†}	Steve Bolus	1963–1965; 1967–1968; 1970–1973	
Larry Booker^{†}	Larry Booker	1978	
William Borders^{†}	Jim Grabmire	1963–1966	
William Boulware Jr.	Rocky King	1986	
Wayde Bowles^{†}	Rocky Johnson	1979; 1981; 1985–1986	
Mike Bowyer^{†}	Mike Boyette / Mike Boyer	1973; 1978–1979	
Robert Boyer	Bob Boyer	1961–1962; 1967–1968	
Bob Bradley	The Great Dane	1964	
Todd Brafford	Todd Champion	1986–1987	
Dino Bravo^{†}	Dino Bravo	1959	
Jack Brisco^{†}	Jack Brisco	1973–1976; 1980; 1982	
Floyd Brisco	Jerry Brisco / Bud Brisco	1967; 1969; 1980	
Timothy Brooks^{†}	Killer Tim Brooks	1970; 1978	
Bob Brown^{†}	Bulldog Bob Brown	1964–1970; 1973–1988	
Gerald Brown^{†}	Jerry Brown / Gerald Brown	1968–1969; 1978–1983	
Jack Brown^{†}	Bad Boy Brown	1950–1951; 1954; 1956	
Kerry Brown^{†}	Kerry Brown / Super Destroyer	1979–1981; 1983–1985	
Orville Brown^{†}	Orville Brown	1948–1950	
Richard Brown	Richard Brown	1954–1958	
Roscoe Brumbaugh^{†}	Rocky Monroe	1956	
Guy Brunetti^{†}	Guy Brunetti	1954–1956	
Robert Bruns^{†}	Bobby Bruns	1948–1951; 1956–1960	
James Brunzell	Jim Brunzell	1973–1977; 1984–1985	
Richard Bryant^{†}	Chief Little Eagle	1957; 1961–1962	
Vince Bryant^{†}	Steve Kovacs	1963	
Arthur Bull^{†}	Danny Fenelon	1948–1949	
Samson Burke	Sammy Berg	1951	
Richard Buster^{†}	Luis Torres	1961	
Richard Cain^{†}	Ricky Gibson	1976; 1983	
William Calhoun^{†}	Haystacks Calhoun / Hillbilly Calhoun	1956–1957; 1971; 1975–1977; 1980	
Herbert Calvert Jr.^{†}	Herb Calvert	1980	
Charles Cambell	Chuck Karbo	1966	
Carl Campbell Sr.^{†}	Luke Brown	1969	
Ian Campbell^{†}	Ian Campbell	1957	
Joe Campbell	Joe Campbell	1952	
Ray Candy^{†}	Kareem Muhammad / Ray Candy / The Masked Superfly / The Zambui	1975–1976; 1981–1982; 1985–1986; 1988	
Howard Cantonwine^{†}	Howard Cantonwine	1950–1951	
Ali Ahmet Çapraz^{†}	Ali Bey	1954	
Orville Carlson^{†}	Cowboy Carlson	1963	
Primo Carnera^{†}	Primo Carnera	1951; 1955–1956	
Bob Carson^{†}	Bob Sweetan / K.O. Kox	1969–1970; 1977–1982	
Scott Casey	Scott Casey	1976–1978	
Bobby Cash	Porkchop Cash	1977; 1986–1987	
Tom Cassett^{†}	Teijo Khan	1986–1987	
Joseph Cassius^{†}	Joe Cassius	1953	
Pedro Castillo^{†}	Huracán Castillo / Joe Castro / Cyclone Castro	1967–1968	
John Charyszyn^{†}	Andre Zvezda	1979	
Edward Cholak^{†}	Moose Cholak	1963–1964; 1967	
Masahiro Chono	Masa Chono	1987–1988	
Joseph Chorre Jr.^{†}	Chief Suni War Cloud	1958–1959	
Paul Christerson^{†}	Paul Christy	1967–1968; 1977	
Vic Christy^{†}	Vic Christy	1950	
Joe Chunn^{†}	Handsome Joe Chunn	1972	
Edward Civil^{†}	Leo Savage / Daniel Boone Savage	1950	
Christopher Clancy^{†}	Mike Clancy	1957	
Robert Clay	Bob Clay	1949–1952; 1956	
Pierre Clemont^{†}	Pat Patterson	1964; 1981	
William Cobb^{†}	Happy Humphrey	1961–1962	
Ryland Coffield^{†}	Jimmy Coffield	1949; 1951–1952; 1954	
Bill Cole	Bill Cole	1959–1962	
Eldridge Coleman^{†}	Superstar Billy Graham	1976–1977; 1985	
Frank Collins^{†}	Rip Collins	1961–1963; 1976	
Nelson Combs^{†}	Nelson Royal	1962–1963	
Dennis Condrey	Dennis Condrey	1985–1987	
Lorne Corlett^{†}	Paul Caruso / Karl von Steiger	1964–1965; 1974	
Jean-Louis Cormier^{†}	Rudy Kay	1964	
Leonce Cormier	Tommy Martin	1968–1970; 1975; 1981	
Romeo Cormier^{†}	Terry Martin	1969–1972; 1974–1975	
Yvon Cormier^{†}	The Beast / Joe Gump / Pierre LeBelle	1964; 1974; 1979–1980; 1983	
Giacomo Costa^{†}	Al Costello	1959	
John Cretoria^{†}	Johnny LaRance	1949	
Art Crews	Art Crews	1980–1982; 1984–1986	
Pablo Crispín^{†}	The Great Goliath	1976	
Bill Crouch	Butch Malone	1980	
William Cruickshanks	Bill Dundee	1986–1987	
Ruben Cruz^{†}	Hercules Ayala / Crusher Ayala	1982–1983	
Chick Curcuru^{†}	Chick Garibaldi	1948; 1953; 1959	
Sam Curcuru^{†}	Gino Garibaldi	1960	
Angelo Curto^{†}	Martino Angelo	1956; 1958	
John P. Cusic^{†}	Irish Jackie	1950–1952; 1955–1956	
Roland Daniels^{†}	Leroy Brown / Elijah Akeem / Muhammad Jabbar	1978; 1986	
Jack Danielson^{†}	Black Jack Daniels / Jack the Ripper / Jack Mills	1963; 1968	
William Darnell^{†}	Billy Darnell	1949; 1957	
Ricky Davidson^{†}	Rick Davidson	1976–1977	
Karl Davis^{†}	Karl Davis	1949–1950; 1955	
Michael Davis	Beautiful Brutus	1970	
William Davis^{†}	Wee Willie Davis	1956	
Chris Davros^{†}	Babe Zaharias	1948–1949; 1952–1953; 1957	
John Paul Demann	John Paul Demann / Jon Paul DeMans	1986	
Richard Demonbraun^{†}	Dick Dunn	1963	
Edward Denton	Len Denton / Grappler #1	1977; 1984	
Ralph Derreberry	The Animal	1984	
Dean Detton^{†}	Dean Detton	1949	
Alvin DeVall^{†}	Chief Red Cloud	1959	
Michael DiBiase^{†}	Mike DiBiase	1950–1952; 1954–1957; 1964–1968	
Theodore DiBiase	Ted DiBiase	1977–1980; 1982–1985	
Joseph DiTommaso^{†}	The Bat / Joe Tomasso	1961; 1964–1965	
Anthony Dobie^{†}	Jim Dobie	1948; 1950–1951; 1955–1961	
Andrew Douglas^{†}	Booker T	1983	
Elio Drazich	Coloso Colosetti / Colosso Colosetti	1978–1979	
William Dromo	Bill Dromo	1962	
Gene DuBuque^{†}	Gene Dubuque	1952	
James Duggan Jr.	Jim Duggan	1984–1985	
Bobby Duncum Sr.	Bobby Duncum	1967; 1976; 1978–1979; 1983; 1985	
Roy Dunn^{†}	Roy Dunn	1956	
Joe Jack Dunnavant^{†}	Jack Donovan / Jack Dunnevant	1956; 1966–1967	
Joseph Eakins^{†}	Ike Eakins	1955–1958	
Bobby Eaton^{†}	Bobby Eaton	1985–1987	
Floyd Eckert^{†}	Ray Eckert	1950–1955	
Haruka Eigen^{†}	The Great Togo	1973	
Arteen Ekizian^{†}	Ali Baba	1948; 1955	
Robert Ellis	Cowboy Bob Ellis	1958–1960; 1963; 1965–1972	
Douglas Embry	Eric Embry	1978–1979	
John Emerling^{†}	Bobby Becker / Ray Schwartz	1948; 1952	
William Ensor^{†}	Buddy Landel	1983; 1985–1986	
Wayne Ermatinger	Wayne Hammer / Mike Hammer / Mike Blood	1976–1977; 1979; 1981	
Marshall Esteppe^{†}	Marshall Esteppe / Marshall Estep	1948–1953	
Ronald Etchison, Sr.^{†}	Ron Etchison / Ronnie Etchinson	1948–1958; 1961; 1963–1965; 1967–1977	
Harvey Evers^{†}	Rip Hawk	1957–1961; 1964	
Henry Faggart^{†}	Jackie Fargo	1963	
Edward Faieta^{†}	Ed Faieta / Ed Gardenia	1952; 1956	
James Fanning	Jimmy Valiant	1982; 1984–1987	
Edward Farhat^{†}	The Sheik	1963; 1965; 1972–1974	
Woody Farmer^{†}	Woody Farmer	1968–1969	
Samuel Fatu	The Tonga Kid	1985	
Patrick Fenelon^{†}	Ken Fenelon	1948; 1951	
Emanuel Fernandez	Manny Fernandez	1982–1983; 1986	
Raymond Fernandez^{†}	Hercules Hernandez / Ray Hernandez	1981–1983	
Richard Ferrara^{†}	Pierre Bonnet	1979	
Scott Ferris	Scott Ferris	1983–1984	
Tonga Fifita	Tonga Fifita	1978	
Harry Finkelstein^{†}	Harry Lewis	1954–1955; 1957; 1959	
Hyman Fishman^{†}	Ivan Rasputin	1948–1949; 1951; 1953; 1955	
Mark Fleming	Mark Fleming	1986	
Gary Fletcher^{†}	Man Mountain Mike	1968; 1971; 1973	
Richard Fliehr	Ric Flair	1980–1986	
John Foley	John Foley	1976	
Alexander Fontes^{†}	Ali Pasha	1949	
Mario Fornini^{†}	Angelo Savoldi	1957	
John Fotie^{‡}^{†}	John Foti	1959	
Kit Fox^{†}	Chief Kit Fox	1952; 1957	
Patrick Fraley	Pat Fraley	1952–1953	
Paul Frederick^{†}	Paul Jones	1986	
Earl Patrick Freeman^{†}	Bud Freeman	1964	
Jay French	Jay French	1973; 1983	
Charlie Fulton^{†}	Gary Fulton	1975	
Yasuyuki Fujii	Yasu Fujii	1971–1972; 1975; 1983	
Harry Fujiwara^{†}	Mr. Fuji	1983	
Dory Funk Sr.^{†}	Dory Funk	1971–1972	
Dory Funk Jr.	Dory Funk Jr.	1965; 1969–1973; 1975–1980; 1982; 1984	
Terrance Funk	Terry Funk	1965; 1972–1973; 1975–1978; 1980; 1982; 1984–1985	
Hiromichi Fuyuki^{†}	Masamichi Fuyuki / Ricky Fuyuki	1985	
John Gabor	Fritz von Goering	1961	
Greg Gagne	Greg Gagne	1976–1977; 1984	
Jean Gagné^{†}	Frenchy Martin	1974–1975	
LaVerne Gagne^{†}	Verne Gagne	1950; 1952; 1954–1958; 1962–1964; 1972	
Dominic Galento^{†}	Tony Galento	1948; 1952	
John Gallagher^{†}	Doc Gallagher	1954	
George Gallagher^{†}	George Gallagher	1954	
Hubert Gallant	Hubert Gallant	1976	
Jeff Gaylord	Jeff Gaylord	1986	
Robert Geigel^{†}	Bob Geigel	1950; 1956–1977; 1980; 1987	
Charles Geoghegan^{†}	Tim Geohagen	1966	
Michael George	Mike George	1973–1978; 1980–1988	
Herbert Gerwig^{†}	Killer Karl Kox	1965; 1969–1970; 1974; 1977; 1980	
Albert Getson^{†}	Al Getz	1953	
Thomas Gilbert Sr.^{†}	Tommy Gilbert	1980	
Thomas Gilbert Jr.^{†}	Eddie Gilbert	1979–1983; 1988	
Edward Giovannetti	Moondog Moretti	1986	
Steve Gobrukovich^{†}	Steve Gob / Nicoli Volkoff	1952; 1964	
William Goelz^{†}	Billy Goelz	1948; 1966	
José Gómez	Tony Russo	1971; 1975; 1984	
Carlos González	Carlos Colón	1966	
José González	Sabu	1969	
Luther Goodall^{†}	Luther Lindsay	1963	
Frank Goodish^{†}	Bruiser Brody	1978–1987	
William Goodman^{†}	Big Bad John	1975	
Terry Gordy^{†}	Terry Gordy	1981–1982; 1984	
Seiji Goto^{†}	Tarzan Goto	1985–1987	
Archie Gouldie^{†}	The Mongolian Stomper / The Stomper	1963–1967; 1969–1972; 1981	
Orville Grabeel^{†}	Dr. Lee Grable	1956–1957	
Roy Graham^{†}	Roy Graham	1948–1954	
George Gray	One Man Gang	1984–1985	
Jacob Grobbe^{†}	The Great Zorra	1953	
Gilbert Guerra^{†}	Gilbert Guerrero	1973–1974	
Raymond Gunkel^{†}	Ray Gunkel	1950	
Scott Hall^{†}	American Starship Coyote	1985	
Audley Hader^{†}	Jack Hader	1948–1953; 1956	
Robert Hamby	Bob Hamby	1967–1968	
Joseph Hamilton^{†}	The Assassin / Assassin #1 / Joe Hamilton	1957–1961; 1964; 1966; 1979–1980	
Larry Hamilton^{†}	Larry Hamilton / Rocky Hamilton / The Missouri Mauler	1951–1967	
John Stanley Hansen II	Stan Hansen	1984	
George Hardison^{†}	Seelie Samara / Ras Samara	1948–1953; 1955	
Charles Harris^{†}	Chris Colt	1986	
Billy Harris	Billy Starr	1979–1981	
Houston Harris^{†}	Bobo Brazil	1965; 1973; 1975; 1978; 1983	
James Harris^{†}	Kamala / Sugar Bear Harris	1979; 1983–1986	
John Harris^{†}	Big John Harris	1985	
Michael Harris	Mike Stone	1987–1988	
Gary Hart	Gary Young	1977–1978	
Emil Hason^{†}	Emil Dusek	1948–1954; 1956–1961	
Ernie Hason^{†}	Ernie Dusek	1948–1954; 1956–1961; 1963	
Joseph Hason^{†}	Joe Dusek	1948–1958	
Mitsuo Hata^{†}	Mitsuo Hata / Matsuda Hata	1976–1977	
Alfred Hayes^{†}	Lord Alfred Hayes	1973–1975; 1977; 1979–1980	
Erwin Hayes^{†}	Gil Hayes	1968	
Ron Heard^{†}	Ron Bass	1975–1976	
Don Heaton^{†}	Don Leo Jonathan	1955; 1961	
Laurence Heffernan^{†}	Roy Heffernan	1959	
Earnest Hefner	Dutch Hefner	1950; 1952; 1954–1955	
Michael Hegstrand^{†}	Road Warrior Hawk	1984; 1986	
Patrick Helvey	Rick McCord	1986–1987	
Curt Hennig^{†}	Curt Hennig	1984; 1986	
John Henning^{†}	John Paul Henning	1960–1962; 1964; 1967	
Leland Henning^{†}	Lee Henning	1950; 1958–1967; 1969; 1972	
Bernard Herman^{†}	Ricki Starr	1970	
Robert Hermann^{†}	Hans Hermann	1953–1954; 1959	
Francisco Hernández^{†}	Sugi Sito	1956	
Orion Heskin^{†}	Thor Hagen	1957–1963; 1965–1971	
Frank Hester^{†}	Frank Hester	1969–1970	
Jerry Hester	Jim Starr / Intern #1 / 666	1974–1975; 1983	
Frank Hewitt^{†}	Frank Hewitt	1953–1954	
Dale Hey^{†}	Buddy Roberts / Buddy Smith	1970; 1981; 1984	
Michael Hickenbottom	Shawn Michaels	1985–1986	
Frank Hickey^{†}	Frank Hickey / Night Terror / Bozo Brown	1948; 1957; 1960; 1965; 1970–1971	
Larry Higgins	Hacksaw Higgins / Grizzly Boone	1984–1986; 1988	
John Hill^{†}	Guy Mitchell / Jerry Valiant	1967; 1970; 1977; 1981–1982; 1984	
Ken Hill	Ken Hill	1956–1957	
James Hines	Bobby Fulton	1983	
Daniel Hodge^{†}	Danny Hodge	1968–1969	
Alfred Hodgson^{†}	Jack Wentworth	1955	
Ronald Hogg^{†}	George Drake	1960–1961	
Victor Holbrook Jr.^{†}	Vic Holbrook	1950; 1953–1955	
Stan Holek^{†}	Stan Lisowski	1959–1960	
Eric Holmback^{†}	Yukon Eric	1954–1955; 1958–1959	
Frank Hoy^{†}	Black Angus Campbell	1972–1975; 1977	
Ray Hrstich^{†}	Dick Gordon / Ray Gordon	1959–1963	
Rodolfo Huerta^{†}	El Santo	1971	
Curtis Hughes	Curtis Hughes	1987–1988	
Donald Huizenga^{†}	Baron von Heisinger	1968–1969; 1971	
Larry Hulin^{†}	Bobby Graham / The Red Raider	1961; 1964–1965	
Michael Hull^{†}	Otto von Heller	1976	
George Hultz	George Hultz	1971	
Juan Humberto^{†}	Juan Humberto	1962	
Francis Huntington	Frank Hill	1976; 1979	
Edward Husmann	Ed Husmann	1956	
Wes Hutchings	Hartford Love	1978–1979	
Richard Hutton^{†}	Dick Hutton	1953; 1955–1956; 1958–1960	
Nedelco Ilitch^{†}	Nick Elitch	1950	
Kanji Inoki^{†}	Tokyo Tom	1964	
Barney Irwin	Bill Irwin / Super Destroyer #2	1979–1980	
Takashi Ishikawa	Takashi Onome / Mr. Onomi	1978	
Masaru Iwamoto^{†}	The Great Moto / Mr. Moto	1950; 1955	
Cary Jackson^{†}	Colt Steel / Colt Steele	1986–1987	
Bradley James^{†}	Brad Armstrong	1983–1984; 1986–1987	
Frederick Jannetty	Marty Jannetty	1984–1986	
James Janos	Jesse Ventura	1975; 1978; 1983	
Don Jardine^{†}	Don Jardine / The Spoiler	1964; 1968; 1977	
Frank Jares^{†}	Frank Jares / The Thing	1951–1952	
James Jefferson^{†}	Spike	1986–1987	
Lawrence Jefferson	Basher	1986–1987	
Robert Jeaudoin^{†}	Bobby Jaggers	1974–1975; 1977–1978; 1980–1981; 1986–1987	
Matt Jewell	Matt Jewell	1962	
William Jodoin	Bill Jodoin / Bill Jordan	1983	
Tor Johansson^{†}	Super Swedish Angel	1952	
James Johnson^{†}	Luke Graham	1966; 1970; 1984	
Gervaise Jones^{†}	John Ruffin	1978	
Joel Jones	Joel Deaton / Thunderfoot #1	1986	
Tommy Lee Jones	Tommy Rogers	1984	
Terrance Joyal^{†}	Terry Garvin	1982–1984	
Brian Juer	Joe Lightfoot	1986–1988	
Francis Julian^{†}	Frank Marconi	1949; 1968; 1971	
Juan Kachmanian^{†}	Pampero Firpo / Ivan the Terrible	1958; 1965	
John Kakacek^{†}	Johnny Kace	1963–1964; 1966; 1970	
George Kahaumia^{†}	Taro Miyaki / Professor Hiro	1960–1961; 1963–1964	
Don Kalt^{†}	Don Fargo	1974; 1976	
McRonald Kamaka^{†}	Tor Kamata	1966–1971	
Ruben Kane	Robert Gibson / Ruben Gold / Rueben Goldstein	1975; 1984–1986	
Gust Karavites^{†}	Gust Karras	1954	
Haralambos Karpozilos	The Great Karpozilos	1955	
Abe Kashey^{†}	Abe Kashey	1948–1949; 1953	
Joseph Katelmach^{†}	Joe Corbett	1952	
Lanny Kean^{†}	Cousin Junior	1986	
Charles Kemmerer^{†}	Babe Sharkey	1948	
Lloyd Kennedy^{†}	Jack Kennedy	1948; 1952	
Wayne Keown	Dutch Mantell	1975–1976	
Jacobo Kerszberg^{†}	Tito Kopa / The Turk	1970; 1979	
Masao Kimura^{†}	Masao Kimura	1969–1970	
Gene Kiniski^{†}	Gene Kiniski	1959–1960; 1966–1968; 1982–1983; 1985	
Willis Kirby^{†}	Roger Kirby	1968; 1970–1974; 1976–1977; 1979–1985	
Louis Klein^{†}	Lou Klein	1958–1959; 1976	
Jaymie Knight	The Shadow	1986	
Russell Knorr^{†}	Tiny Anderson	1981	
Seymour Koenig	Johann Koenig	1957	
Shinya Kojika	The Great Kojika	1969	
Yasuhiro Kojima^{†}	Hiro Matsuda	1962	
Ioanis Kostolias^{†}	Johnny Kostas	1955–1956; 1962	
Matthew Kostrencich^{†}	Matt Murphy	1951; 1953–1954	
Fred Koury Sr.^{†}	Bull Curry	1956	
Sandor Kovacs^{†}	Sandor Kovacs	1954	
Frank Krawiec^{†}	Frank Taylor	1952; 1958	
Harold Kruskamp^{†}	Hardy Kruskamp	1955	
John Kurgis^{†}	Johnny Kurgis / Sonny Kurgis	1948–1949	
Masatake Kusatsu^{†}	The Great Kusatsu	1971–1972	
Kola Kwariani^{†}	Kola Kwariani	1950	
Louis LaCourse	Apache Gringo / El Gringo	1971–1972; 1975	
Ernest Ladd^{†}	Ernie Ladd	1966–1970; 1976–1977; 1980	
Wallace Lam Ho^{†}	Oni Wiki Wiki	1956	
Michel Lamarche^{†}	Alexi Smirnoff / Alexis Smirnoff	1978–1979	
Florian Langevin^{†}	Bob Langevin	1959	
John Lanza^{†}	Blackjack Lanza	1970; 1972; 1976; 1983–1984	
James LaRock^{†}	Jim LaRock	1959–1960	
Maurice LaPointe	Maurice LaPointe	1962	
Guy Larose^{†}	Hans Schmidt	1953; 1955; 1958–1959; 1962; 1964–1965; 1972–1973	
Herbert Larson^{†}	Herb Larson	1960; 1963	
Joseph Laurinaitis^{†}	Road Warrior Animal	1984; 1986	
Jerry Lawler	Jerry Lawler	1983; 1986	
Ivan LeBell ^{†}	Gene LeBell / The Hangman	1960; 1967	
Jim Ledford	Jim Ledford	1973–1974	
Don Leeds^{†}	Don McClarity	1961	
Robert Leedy^{†}	Sky Hi Lee	1954	
Pierre Lefebvre^{†}	Pierre Lefebvre	1974	
William Lehman^{†}	Siegfried Steinke	1979–1980	
Robert Leipler^{†}	Bob Leipler / Duke Hoffman	1953; 1961–1962	
Antone Leone^{†}	Antone Leone	1955	
Michele Leone^{†}	Baron Michele Leone	1953–1955	
Martin Levy^{†}	The Blimp	1948	
Donn Lewin^{†}	Don Lewin	1951	
Mark Lewin	Mark Lewin	1954–1955; 1957	
Gene Ligon	Dave Deaton / Thunderfoot #2	1986	
Douglas Lindzy^{†}	Doug Gilbert / Doug Lindsey	1960; 1965; 1968; 1978	
Reginald Lisowski^{†}	Reggie Lisowski / The Crusher	1954–1955; 1964; 1967	
Marcel Livernois^{†}	Monty LaDue	1949	
Vincent Lizdennis^{†}	Dennis Clary	1950–1951; 1954	
Carey Lloyd^{†}	Rufus R. Jones	1969–1975; 1977; 1979–1982; 1984–1988	
Jack Lloyd^{†}	Danno O'Shocker	1954; 1958	
Alapati Lolotai^{†}	Alo Leilani	1951–1952; 1954	
Willard Longson^{†}	Wild Bill Longson	1948–1950; 1952–1960	
Jesús Mario López	Chief Thundercloud	1976	
Pedro Godoy López^{†}	Pedro Godoy / Masked Medic #1	1954; 1961; 1963	
Roberto López	Pepper Pérez	1961	
James Lott	Jimmy Lott	1949–1950; 1953	
Martin Lunde	Arn Anderson	1985–1987	
Ken Lusk	Ken Mantell	1974	
Charles Lutkie^{†}	Charlie Lutkie	1948; 1951; 1955	
Roger Mackay	Roger Mackay	1956	
Leslie Malady	Les Thatcher	1963	
Peter Managoff^{†}	Pete Managoff	1952; 1954	
Robert Manoogian Jr.^{†}	Bobby Managoff	1959	
Edwin Mansfield	Eddie Mansfield	1977; 1983	
Robert Marella^{†}	Gino Marella	1961–1962	
Donald Marlin	Farmer Don Marlin	1959–1960	
John Marrs^{†}	Johnny Marrs	1948	
Efrain Martinez^{†}	Frank Martinez / Pistol Pete	1966; 1974	
Ignacio Martinez^{†}	Pedro Martínez	1954	
Lorenzo Martino^{†}	Lorenzo Parente	1961–1962; 1967	
Albert Massey^{†}	Al Massey	1952	
Benjamin Matta^{†}	Benny Matta	1955	
Steven May	Steve Ray	1987–1988	
Earl Maynard	Earl Maynard	1967–1969	
Mikhaił Mazurkiewicz^{†}	Mike Mazurki	1952	
George McArthur^{†}	Crybaby Cannon	1963	
Roy McClarty^{†}	Roy McClarty / Roy McClarity	1955–1956; 1959	
Robert McCoy^{†}	Bibber McCoy / El Toro	1954–1956	
Raymond McCra	Tuffy McCrae / Tuffy McRae / Tuffy McRea	1952–1955	
Benny McCrary^{†}	Benny McGuire	1973	
Billy McCrary^{†}	Billy McGuire	1973	
Robert McCune^{†}	Bob McCune / Mr. America	1952–1955	
William McDaniel	Billy McDaniels	1953–1955; 1959	
Edward McDaniel^{†}	Wahoo McDaniel	1964; 1984–1986	
James McDonald^{†}	Danno McDonald	1959	
Patrick McGill^{†}	Pat McGill	1948	
Stephen McGill^{†}	Steve McGill	1955–1956	
Richard McGraw^{†}	Rick McGraw	1976; 1978	
Leroy McGuirk^{†}	Leroy McGuirk	1949	
Donald McIntyre^{†}	Don McIntyre	1948	
William McIntyre^{†}	Bill McIntyre / Red McIntyre	1948; 1950–1951; 1955–1959	
Frank McKenzie^{†}	Tex McKenzie	1956; 1970; 1973	
Mayes McLain^{†}	Mayes McLain	1950	
Paul McManus^{†}	Frank Morgan / Bob Rader	1961; 1965	
Douglas McMichen^{†}	Tank Patton / The Spoiler	1975–1976; 1978–1980	
Lawrence McMullen^{†}	Kenny Mack	1966	
Danny McShain^{†}	Danny McShain	1951–1952; 1954	
Hugh Meador^{†}	Tiny Bell	1961–1962	
Ajandro Cruz Medina^{†}	Alex Medina	1969	
Gerald Meeker^{†}	Jerry Meeker	1949–1951	
Gilberto Melendez^{†}	Gypsy Joe	1984–1985	
Christos Melissovas^{†}	Chris Averoff	1964	
Frank Menacker^{†}	Sammy Menacker	1956	
Akihisa Mera^{†}	The Great Kabuki / Takachiho	1980; 1982	
Omar Mijares	Omar Atlas	1971–1976; 1978–1983	
Daniel Miller^{†}	Dan Miller	1961; 1964	
William Miller^{†}	Dr. Bill Miller	1959; 1963–1964; 1972; 1974	
Walter Millich^{†}	Joe Millich	1951; 1955; 1959; 1963–1965	
Charles Milliser^{†}	J.R. Hogg	1986	
John Minton^{†}	Chuck O'Connor / Big John Studd	1975; 1983	
Francois Miquet^{†}	Corsica Joe / Mephisto #1 / Francois Miquet	1949; 1961–1962; 1965; 1969	
George Mitchell^{†}	Chief Chewacki	1949	
James Mitchell^{†}	Black Panther	1957	
Adolph Mittlestadt^{†}	Al Mills	1948–1949; 1958	
Henry Mittelstadt^{†}	Tiny Mills	1949; 1962–1965; 1967–1968	
George Momberg^{†}	Killer Karl Krupp	1974; 1978; 1983	
Yoshihiro Momota^{†}	Yoshihiro Momota	1980	
Gerald Monti^{†}	Jerry Monti	1969	
Jack Moore^{†}	Tiger Jack Moore	1950; 1952	
Pedro Morales^{†}	Pedro Morales	1976; 1978	
J. J. Dillon	J. J. Dillon / Jim Dillon	1964; 1981	
Bob Morse^{†}	The Viking	1965–1975	
Randy Morse^{†}	Randy Morse	1979; 1981	
James Morrow	Danny Dale	1961	
Frank Murdoch^{†}	Frankie Murdoch	1949–1950	
Hoyt Murdoch^{†}	Dick Murdoch	1966; 1968–1970; 1974–1975; 1977–1980; 1982–1983; 1986–1987	
Harold Myers^{†}	Sonny Myers / Super Destroyer / Dr. X	1948–1968; 1973–1975; 1979–1983; 1985	
Stan Mykietovitch^{†}	Moose Morowski / Stan the Moose	1968–1969; 1974; 1976–1977	
Stan Myslajek^{†}	Stan Myslajek	1953	
Raymond Nadeau	Vince Corte	1956	
Pak Song Nam^{†}	Pak Song	1980	
Arthur Nelson^{†}	Art Neilson	1954–1955; 1965	
Bobby Nelson^{†}	Bobby Nelson	1948–1949; 1954	
Melvin Nelson^{†}	Burrhead Jones	1977	
David Nevins	Dave Nevins	1976–1982; 1985	
Howard Newell	Bill Howard	1964; 1970; 1972–1975; 1979–1984	
Newman^{†}	Leo Newman	1949	
Samuel Nichals^{†}	Jackie Nichols	1954; 1962	
Vic Nichols^{†}	Hillbilly Vic	1973	
Leo Nomellini^{†}	Leo Nomellini	1955	
Walter Nurnberg^{†}	Karl Von Stroheim	1964; 1972	
Robert Nutt^{†}	Ron Starr / Mr. Wrestling	1977–1981	
Reino Nyman^{†}	Lou Newman	1948–1949; 1955	
Patrick O'Connor^{†}	Pat O'Connor	1950; 1959–1982	
Mike O'Leary^{†}	Mike York	1965; 1967–1968; 1976	
George Okamura^{†}	The Great Togo	1951	
William Olivas^{†}	Elephant Boy	1952; 1957	
Larry Oliver, Sr.^{†}	Rip Oliver	1978	
Juan Onaindia^{†}	Juan Sebastian / Masked Medic #2	1961; 1963; 1972–1973; 1975	
Paul Orndorff^{†}	Paul Orndorff	1978; 1982–1983	
Lenny Ornstein	Jack Armstrong	1969	
Paul Orth^{†}	Paul Orth	1949; 1951	
Bob Orton, Sr.^{†}	Bob Orton	1950–1964; 1966–1967; 1969; 1971–1974; 1977	
Bob Orton, Jr.	Bob Orton, Jr.	1973–1975; 1978; 1983	
Randal Orton^{†}	Barry Orton	1977	
James Osborn	Jim Osborn	1969	
Robert Owen^{†}	Bob Owens	1986	
Masashi Ozawa	Killer Khan	1984	
Michael Paidousis^{†}	Mike Paidousis / Dark Secret	1951; 1957; 1960	
Christopher Pailles^{†}	King Kong Bundy	1984	
Jim Painter	Masked Terror	1973	
Max Palmer^{†}	Max Palmer	1955	
Moody Palmer^{†}	Moody Palmer	1949	
Frederick Pantano^{†}	Bull Montana	1958	
Dominic Papaleo	Reyes Nacho	1953	
Robert Pare^{†}	Marquis de Paree	1961	
Reggie Parks^{†}	Reggie Parks	1963–1964; 1970; 1974; 1979–1980	
William Parks^{†}	Bill Parks	1960	
King Parsons Jr.^{†}	King Parsons	1983–1985	
Leonardo Passafaro^{†}	Lenny Montana	1953	
Arnold Pastricks	Kurt Von Steiger	1973–1974	
Kenneth Patera	Ken Patera	1981–1984	
Claude Patterson	Claude Patterson / Thunderbolt Patterson	1964–1965; 1977	
Joseph Pazandak^{†}	Joe Pazandak	1949–1950; 1954	
Kenneth Peal	Tiger Mask	1983–1984	
José Alex Pérez^{†}	Alex Pérez	1966; 1978	
Thomas Perna^{†}	Tommy Hawk	1963	
Oreal Perras^{†}	Ivan Koloff	1977; 1982; 1985–1987	
Jack Pesek^{†}	Jack Pesek	1950–1953; 1956–1957; 1959–1960; 1968	
Milford Peter^{†}	Mel Peters	1949; 1953	
Dean Peters^{†}	Brady Boone	1986–1987	
David Peterson^{†}	Dave Peterson / D.J. Peterson	1984–1988	
Gene Petit^{†}	Gene Lewis / The Mongol	1981–1983	
George Petraski^{†}	The Russian Brute	1985–1988	
Henry Phillips Jr.^{†}	Treach Phillips	1962; 1971	
Roberto Pico^{†}	Roberto Pico / Bobby Lane / The Plum	1948; 1952–1954; 1956; 1960; 1967; 1972	
David Pinkerton	Dave Sims	1952–1954	
Karol Piwoworczyk^{†}	Karol Kalmikoff / Karol Krauser	1948; 1953; 1963	
Danny Plechas^{†}	Danny Plechas	1949–1952; 1955–1956; 1958; 1962–1966	
Louis Plummer^{†}	Lou Plummer	1956–1958	
Angelo Poffo^{†}	Angelo Poffo	1964	
Lanny Poffo^{†}	Lanny Poffo	1983	
Eric Pomeroy^{†}	Stan Pulaski / The Mad Russian / The Destroyer	1958; 1969–1970; 1972–1973	
Ron Pope	The Magnificent Zulu	1975	
Kay Posniak	Kay Casey	1975	
William Potts^{†}	Whipper Billy Watson	1956	
Freddie Prosser^{†}	Killer Cox	1969–1971	
James Prudhomme^{†}	The Brute	1961	
Calvin Pullins^{†}	Charlie Pullins / Chuck Pullins / Prince Pullins	1974–1976; 1980–1982	
Salvador Quesada^{†}	Gori Guerrero	1960	
Inman Raborn^{†}	Billy Raburn	1952	
Harley Race^{†}	Harley Race / The Great Mortimer / Jack Long	1963–1964; 1967–1986	
Charles Raines^{†}	Dick Raines	1950–1951	
Benjamin Ramírez^{†}^{†}	Benny Ramírez / The Mummy	1970–1973; 1975–1979; 1981–1982	
Austin Rapes^{†}	Buddy Austin / Bulldog Austin	1961–1962; 1971	
James Raschke	Baron von Raschke	1970–1976; 1982–1984; 1986–1987	
Ronald Read	Ron Reed	1964–1967	
Eugene Reardon^{†}	Gene Reardon	1950–1951; 1953; 1956–1957	
Bruce Reed^{†}	Bruce Reed / Butch Reed	1979–1984; 1986	
Jerry Reese^{†}	Big Red Reese	1976–1977	
Timothy Reid	Timothy Flowers	1985–1986	
Robert Remus	Bob Slaughter / Sgt. Slaughter	1976–1979; 1981–1982; 1985–1986; 1988	
Thomas Renesto^{†}	Tom Renesto / Tony Martin	1955; 1968	
Monroe Rice Jr.	Randy Tyler	1977	
Thomas Rice^{†}	Carl Von Doyle / Herman Von Doyle / The Red Phantom	1949	
Michael Lee Richard^{†}	T. John Tibbedeux	1980	
Thomas Richardson	Tommy Rich	1982; 1986–1987	
Sylvester Ritter^{†}	Junkyard Dog	1984	
Leonard Roberts	Red Roberts	1949	
Nick Roberts^{†}	Nick Roberts	1951; 1960	
Byron Robertson^{†}	Dewey Robertson / The Missing Link	1970; 1981–1985	
Ramon Eduardo Rodríguez^{†}	Cyclone Negro / Ciclón Negro / Cyclops	1974–1975; 1981	
Theodore Roebuck^{†}	Tiny Roebuck	1949	
Alan Rogowski	Ole Anderson	1986	
Herman Rohde Jr.^{†}	Buddy Rogers	1948–1949; 1951; 1953; 1957; 1961	
Enrique Romero^{†}	Ricky Romero	1970; 1973; 1981–1983	
Mark Romero	Mark Romero / Mark Youngblood	1981–1985	
Steven Romero^{†}	Jay Youngblood	1984	
Richard Rood^{†}	Rick Rude	1986	
Victor Rosettani^{†}	Vic Rossitani	1968–1969	
Jacques Rougeau	Jerry Roberts	1981	
André Roussimoff^{†}	André the Giant	1974–1983	
Gary Rowell	Gary Royal	1982–1985	
Virgil Runnels Jr.^{†}	Dusty Rhodes	1968–1970; 1975–1976; 1980–1982; 1984–1986	
Willi Rutkowsky^{†}	Kurt Von Stroheim	1964; 1972	
Ronald Rychliski	Ron Ritchie	1983–1984	
Gary Sabaugh	The Italian Stallion	1986–1987	
Robert Sabre^{†}	Bob Sabre	1970	
Gadowar Sahota	Gama Singh	1979–1980	
Manny Saine	Terry Gibbs	1978; 1981	
Seiji Sakaguchi	Seiji Sakaguchi	1971	
Kazuo Sakurada^{†}	Chang Chung	1976–1981	
Peter Sanchez	Gino Caruso	1970	
Charles Santen^{†}	Wally Dusek	1948; 1950; 1952–1953	
Akio Sato	Akio Sato	1975–1977; 1979–1980; 1984–1986	
Emmanuel Savenas	Mike Pappas	1976–1978	
Joseph Savoldi Jr.^{†}	Joe Savoldi	1950	
Luke Scarpa^{†}	Joe Scarpa	1958–1959	
Joseph Scarpello^{†}	Joe Scarpello	1962–1964; 1969–1970; 1980	
Ray Schilling^{†}	Logger Larsen	1953–1954	
Kenneth Schiscka^{†}	Ken Kenneth	1948–1949	
Robert Schoenberger^{†}	Bobby Shane	1965–1968; 1970	
Mark Sciarra	Rip Rogers	1987	
Mikel Scicluna^{†}	Baron Mikel Scicluna	1973–1974	
Angus Scott^{†}	Sandy Scott	1960	
George Scott^{†}	George Scott / Doug Scott	1952; 1960	
Michael Seitz	Michael Hayes	1981–1982; 1984	
Tetsuo Sekigawa^{†}	Great Seki / Mr. Seki / The Great Pogo / Mr. Pogo	1975–1978; 1984–1987	
Richard Semin^{†}	Dick Dusek	1951–1953	
Don Serio^{†}	Benito Gardini	1955	
Don Serrano^{†}	Don Serrano	1975	
Morris Shapiro^{†}	Mighty Atlas	1953–1960	
Ben Sharpe^{†}	Ben Sharpe	1949	
Mike Sharpe, Sr.^{†}	Mike Sharpe	1948–1950	
Mike Sharpe, Jr.^{†}	Mike Sharpe	1979	
John Shaw^{†}	Ivan Bulba	1950	
Dan Sheffield^{†}	Gorgeous George Grant / Gorgeous Dream Boy / Gorgeous Phillip / Magnificent Grant	1952; 1956–1957	
Benjamin Sherman, Jr.^{†}	Ben Sherman	1953	
Robert Shibuya^{†}	Kinji Shibuya	1959–1960	
Frank Shields^{†}	Bull Bullinski	1974	
Genichiro Shimada	Genichiro Tenryu	1977; 1984	
Larry Shreve	Abdullah the Butcher	1976; 1987	
Roy Shropshire^{†}	Professor Roy Shire	1956	
Lawrence Simon^{†}	Otto von Krupp	1958–1961; 1964	
Nelson Simpson	Nikita Koloff	1985–1986	
Zivko Simunovich	Lucky Simunovich	1949; 1953–1954	
Anthony Sirois^{†}	Walter Sirois	1948–1950; 1952–1953; 1955–1956	
Louis Sjoberg^{†}	Lou Sjoberg / Karl von Schoberg	1949–1950; 1961–1962	
William Sledge^{†}	Bill Sledge	1948	
Aurelian Smith Sr.^{†}	Tiny Smith	1966	
Aurelian Smith, Jr.	Jake Roberts	1977–1979	
Bert Smith^{†}	Stan Kowalski	1955; 1964	
Curtis Smith	Blue Yankee / The Executioner	1977–1978	
Joe Smith Jr.^{†}	Don Kent	1969	
Michael Smith	Sam Houston	1986–1987	
William Snip^{†}	Billy Red Lyons	1957–1958; 1974–1975	
Mitch Snow^{†}	Mitch Snow	1986–1987	
Wilbur Snyder^{†}	Wilbur Snyder	1956; 1964; 1970; 1978	
Bill Soloweyko^{†}	Klondike Bill	1968	
Douglas Somerson^{†}	Doug Somers	1978; 1983	
Robert Soto	The Avenger	1979–1980	
George South	George South	1986	
William Spearman	Billy Spears	1970; 1979	
Daniel Spivey	American Starship Eagle	1985	
Charles Sprott^{†}	Ricky Hunter	1966–1967	
Edward Spulnik^{†}	Killer Kowalski / Tarzan Kowalski / Wladek Kowalski	1949–1955; 1959; 1961	
Tom Stanton^{†}	Tom Stanton	1978–1979	
Carl Stevens^{†}	Ray Stevens	1975; 1986	
Gene Stevens^{†}	Gene Stevens / Frank Dalton	1973; 1978–1979	
Frank Stewart^{†}	Dutch Savage	1965	
George Stipich^{†}	Stan Stasiak	1960–1962; 1975	
Al Stosky	Stoney Burke	1987	
Rex Stover^{†}	Rex Stover	1948–1949	
Richard Stratten	Ricky Morton	1981; 1984–1986	
David Strawn	Korstia Korchenko	1983–1984	
Woody Strode^{†}	Woody Strode	1956	
Kevin Sullivan	Kevin Sullivan	1978	
John Swenski^{†}	Johnny Swenski	1949–1950	
Phillip Swenson^{†}	Swedish Angel	1955	
Steven Sybert^{†}	Steve Sybert / Steve Seibert	1977; 1983–1988	
Phillip Sylva	Harou Yamamoto	1955	
Albert Szasz^{†}	Al Szasz	1956; 1958; 1960; 1963–1964	
James Szikszay^{†}	Jim Siksay	1954; 1956–1957	
Terry Szopinski	The Warlord	1986–1987	
Vern Taft^{†}	Vern Taft	1954	
Wladyslaw Talun^{†}	Iron Man Talun / Wladyslaw Talun / Mighty Goliath	1950–1952; 1954	
Victor Tamayo	Joe Soto	1970	
Martin Tanaka^{†}	Duke Keomuka	1962	
Joseph Tangaro^{†}	Joe Tangaro	1954–1956; 1967	
Rick Taras	Rick Patterson	1987–1988	
Kenneth Tasker^{†}	Tiger Tasker	1950	
Chris Taylor^{†}	Chris Taylor	1974–1976	
Don Taylor^{†}	Tug Taylor	1984	
Paul Taylor III	Terry Taylor	1981; 1985	
George Temple Jr.^{†}	George Temple	1949–1950	
Arthur Thomas^{†}	Sailor Art Thomas	1964; 1980	
Frank Thompson^{†}	Frank Thompson / Frank Thomas	1954; 1960; 1964	
Les Thornton^{†}	Les Thornton	1972–1973; 1980; 1984	
Ken Timbs^{†}	Ken Timbs	1984–1988	
Lajos Tiza^{†}	Lou Thesz	1949–1959; 1964–1970	
Masanori Toguchi	Kim Duk / Tiger Chung Lee	1982–1983	
Chris Tolos^{†}	Chris Tolos / George Tolos	1955; 1968	
John Tolos^{†}	John Tolos	1955; 1971	
Roderick Toombs^{†}	Roddy Piper	1974; 1983	
William Torontos^{†}	Billy Torontos	1963	
Enrique Torres^{†}	Enrique Torres	1949–1950; 1952; 1955; 1963	
Ramón Torres^{†}	Ramón Torres	1971	
Ted Tourtas	Ted Tourtas	1949	
Camille Tourville^{†}	Tarzan Tyler	1961–1962; 1964; 1969–1970	
Frank Townsend^{†}	Frank Townsend	1960; 1962	
Raymond Traylor, Jr.^{†}	Big Bubba	1986–1987	
William Trout^{†}	Dick Trout	1951	
Benoit Trudel^{†}	Benny Trudel	1950	
Tomomi Tsuruta^{†}	Jumbo Tsuruta	1982; 1984	
Joseph Turner^{†}	Joe Turner	1975	
Tapu Tuufuli	Chief Tapu / Prince Tapu / Tapu	1975; 1982; 1987–1988	
Demitros Tzizikas^{†}	Jesse James / Jimmy James	1948; 1957	
Archie Underwood^{†}	Danny Little Bear	1969–1975	
Maurice Vachon^{†}	Mad Dog Vachon	1964; 1976; 1980	
Paul Vachon	The Butcher	1966–1967	
Gino Vagnone^{†}	Gino Vagnone / Red Vagnone	1949; 1956–1957	
Sione Vailahi	The Barbarian / Tonga John	1983; 1985–1987	
Jesús Becerra Valencia^{†}	Cyclone Anaya	1954–1955	
Fernand Valois^{†}	Frank Valois	1974–1975	
Charles Van Audenarde^{†}	Jack Terry	1950–1951	
Richard Van Slater^{†}	Dick Slater	1988	
Robert Vantroba	Bobby Vann	1975	
Hossein Vaziri	The Iron Sheik	1976	
Jesús Vázquez^{†}	Chief Lone Eagle	1950; 1957	
Héctor Garza Lozano Vela^{†}	Garza Lozano / Great Tonina	1949; 1957	
Eric Verbel	Jack Evans	1978	
Oscar Verdu^{†}	Crusher Verdu	1975	
Richard Vest^{†}	Chief Big Heart	1951–1953	
Christopher Vetoyanis^{†}	Chris Zaharias	1951–1954	
Tom Vetoyanis^{†}	Tom Zaharias	1951–1953; 1956–1957	
Victor^{†}	Victor the Wrestling Bear	1959–1960; 1963–1964; 1972	
Pierre Villeneuve^{†}	Farmer Pete	2952; 1959–1960; 1964; 1976	
Raymond Villmer^{†}	Ray Villmer	1948; 1952–1954; 1958	
Frank Vizi	Ricky Golden	1984	
Fred Volrich^{†}	Man Mountain Dean Jr.	1953	
Kevin Wacholz	Kevin Kelly / Kevin the Magnificent	1984; 1986	
George Wagner^{†}	Gorgeous George	1950–1951; 1954; 1956–1959	
Hiroshi Wajima^{†}	Hiroshi Wajima	1986	
John Walker^{†}	Mr. Wrestling II	1983	
Chet Wallick^{†}	Chet Wallick	1955	
Leo Wallick^{†}	Leo Wallick	1955	
Louis Warren^{†}	Neil Warren	1948–1950; 1953–1954	
Kenneth Weaver^{†}	Johnny Ace / Johnny Weaver	1956–1959; 1972	
Jimmy Wehba^{†}	Skandor Akbar	1965–1966; 1970; 1978; 1980	
Édouard Weiczorkiewicz^{†}	Édouard Carpentier	1959; 1967; 1969; 1975	
George Weingeroff	King Cobra	1984	
Charles Weir	Guillotine Gordon	1967; 1969	
George Wells	George Wells	1979–1980; 1983	
Robert Wharton^{†}	Hogan Wharton	1961	
Pezavan Whatley^{†}	Pez Whatley / Shaska Whatley	1986	
Leo Whippern^{†}	Tug Carlson	1948	
Lawrence Whistler	Larry Zbyszko	1986	
Anthony White	Tony Atlas	1972; 1975; 1984	
William White^{†}	Bill White	1975	
Bobby Whitlock^{†}	Bobby Whitlock	1971–1972; 1974–1976	
Eldon Whittler^{†}	Whitey Whittler	1949–1950	
Eldon Lee Whittler^{†}	Smasher Sloan	1964	
Stanley Wiggins^{†}	Angelo Martinelli	1952	
Edgar Williams^{†}	Scotty Williams	1954; 1957	
James Williams	Jim Garvin	1984–1987	
John Wilson^{†}	Jack Wilson	1966	
Barry Windham	Barry Windham	1983–1984; 1986	
Robert Windham^{†}	Blackjack Mulligan / Bob Windham	1970; 1979; 1983–1984	
Edward Wiskoski	Ed Wiskoski	1972; 1975–1977; 1979–1981	
John Wisniski^{†}	Johnny Valentine	1950–1951; 1953; 1965; 1967; 1972	
Jonathan Wisniski	Greg Valentine	1971; 1981–1983	
Dale Wolfe	Dusty Wolfe	1984–1986	
Les Wolff^{†}	Buddy Wolfe / Buddy Wolff	1974; 1976	
Julius Woronick	The Great Mephisto	1953	
Brett Woyan	Brett Sawyer	1985	
Bruce Woyan^{†}	Buzz Sawyer	1984	
Bill Wright^{†}	Billy Red Cloud	1968; 1976	
Charles Wright	Elmer Larsen	1953	
Edward Wright^{†}	Bearcat Wright	1955; 1966–1967	
James Wright^{†}	Jim Wright	1948–1949; 1953–1954	
Reuben Wright^{†}	Rube Wright / Lu Kim	1948; 1954	
Shin'ichi Yokouchi^{†}	Chati Yokouchi	1971–1972	
Jay York^{†}	The Alaskan	1961; 1963; 1966	
Galton Young^{†}	Skip Young	1976	
Owen Yow^{†}	Billy Cox	1961	
Mariano Yugueros^{†}	Torbellino Blanco	1962	
Pedro Zapata^{†}	Oki Shikina	1966; 1970; 1975; 1978	
Aaron Zimbleman	Slim Zimbleman / Tiny Zimbleman / The Masked Monster	1951–1952	
Eugene Zygowicz^{†}	Gene Stanlee	1956	
Unknown	Abdul Zaatar	1975	
Unknown	Abdullah the Great	1982–1983	
Unknown	Abe Jacobs	1973	
Unknown	Al Cortez / Don Cortez	1952; 1955	
Unknown	Al Lovelock	1950; 1952	
Unknown	Al Warshawski	1953; 1955	
Unknown	Al Williams	1950	
Unknown	Ali Baba, Jr. / Son of Ali Baba	1955	
Unknown^{†}	Amazing Zuma / Argentina Zuma	1956; 1972–1973	
Unknown^{†}	Andre Adoree	1950	
Unknown	Angelo Mosca Jr.	1983	
Unknown	The Angel	1979	
Unknown^{†}	Bad News Beach / Dr. Beach	1974	
Unknown	Ben DeLeon	1980–1981	
Unknown	Ben Morgan	1949–1950	
Unknown	Bill Kersten	1972; 1974–1975	
Unknown	Bill Melby	1957	
Unknown	Billy Two Eagles	1986	
Unknown	Black Orchid	1963	
Unknown	Blackjack Dillon / Jack Dillon	1948; 1955; 1957	
Unknown	Bob Burns	1970	
Unknown	Bob Corby	1956; 1959	
Unknown	Bob DeMarce	1953; 1956	
Unknown	Bob Russell	1982	
Unknown	Bob Shipp	1954	
Unknown	Bob Wagner	1949	
Unknown	Bobby Blaine	1974	
Unknown^{†}	Bobby Hart	1966; 1970	
Unknown^{†}	Bobby Paul	1969–1971	
Unknown	Boris Kosloff	1970	
Unknown	Bruce Kirk	1969–1970	
Unknown	Bryan St. John	1977; 1979	
Unknown	Buddy Jackson	1954	
Unknown^{†}	Buzz Tyler	1980–1985	
Unknown	Caesar Pabon	1979	
Unknown	Carl Fergie	1977–1978	
Unknown	Carlos Moreno	1956	
Unknown	Carlos Rodríguez	1948–1950; 1958–1959; 1961	
Unknown	Chico García	1950; 1955	
Unknown	Chris Curtis	1979	
Unknown	Chris Markoff / Harry Madison	1964–1965	
Unknown^{†}	Cliff Olson	1949	
Unknown	Dale Mann	1970	
Unknown	Dan Burdick	1975–1976	
Unknown^{†}	Dan O'Connor	1948–1949; 1952	
Unknown	Danny Collins	1985	
Unknown	Danny Ferrazza	1954–1955; 1957	
Unknown	Dave Kochen	1981	
Unknown	Dave Jons	1954	
Unknown	David Power	1988	
Unknown	Dennis Brown / Denny Brown	1985–1986	
Unknown^{†}	Dennis Stamp	1976; 1979	
Unknown	Denny Alberts	1977	
Unknown^{†}	Dick Holbrook	1953–1955	
Unknown	Dick Light	1960	
Unknown^{†}	Dick Marshall	1966	
Unknown^{†}	Don Bass / Don Welch	1976; 1979	
Unknown	Don Diamond	1978	
Unknown^{†}	Don Lee / Rocky Lee	1955; 1958; 1960–1962	
Unknown^{†}	Don Slatton / The Lawman	1964	
Unknown	Don Soto	1965–1966	
Unknown	Don Moore	1956	
Unknown	Don Wayt	1975; 1977	
Unknown	Edcar Thomas	1985–1986	
Unknown	Eddie Sharkey	1967–1968	
Unknown	Emir Badui	1948–1949	
Unknown	Farmer Jones	1949–1951	
Unknown	Farmer McGregor / Farmer McGruder	1957; 1961	
Unknown	Farmer Powell	1957	
Unknown	Francisco Rios	1963; 1965; 1967	
Unknown	Frank Altman	1953–1961; 1963–1964; 1968–1971	
Unknown	Frank Diamond	1971–1976	
Unknown	Frank Hurley	1956–1957	
Unknown	Frank Schofro	1950	
Unknown	Fritz Schnabel	1950–1952	
Unknown	Gary Fargo	1975	
Unknown	Gary Jackson	1985–1986	
Unknown	Gene Bowman	1953; 1955	
Unknown	Gentleman Ben the Wrestling Bear	1969; 1973	
Unknown	George Bruckman	1948; 1951; 1955–1956	
Unknown	Gordo Chihuahua / The Great Gordo / Pancho Gordo	1964	
Unknown	Greg Evans	1983; 1987	
Unknown	Grizzly Evans	1984	
Unknown^{†}	Gus Kalas	1966	
Unknown^{†}	Gustav the Giant	1985	
Unknown^{†}	Guy Taylor	1963	
Unknown	Hal Keene	1951; 1958	
Unknown	Hank Metheny	1952	
Unknown	Hans Schnabel	1950–1951; 1955	
Unknown	Harold Cannon	1974	
Unknown	Hillbilly Pete	1977–1978	
Unknown^{†}	Hurricane Hunt	1965	
Unknown	Ivan the Terrible	1955–1958	
Unknown	Ivan Zukoff	1962–1963	
Unknown	Jack Bernard	1953	
Unknown^{†}	Jack Claybourne	1954	
Unknown	Jack Conley / Jack Suzek	1948–1952; 1956	
Unknown	Jack Crawford	1954–1956; 1965	
Unknown	Jack Larue	1961	
Unknown	Jack O'Reilly	1959–1960	
Unknown	Jack Steele / Jay Steele	1948–1950; 1955–1956; 1963	
Unknown	Jake Milliman	1984	
Unknown	Jan Madrid / Juan Madrid	1956	
Unknown^{†}	Jan Nelson	1977	
Unknown	Jay French	1973; 1983	
Unknown	Jerry Gordet	1959	
Unknown^{†}	Jerry Kozak	1966; 1976	
Unknown	Jerry Miller	1961; 1965–1966; 1970; 1972	
Unknown	Jerry Oates	1974–1976; 1980; 1984	
Unknown	Jim Custer	1977–1978	
Unknown	Jim Dalton / Mephisto #2	1969; 1973	
Unknown	Jim Gorman	1984	
Unknown	Jim Henry	1952	
Unknown	Jim Hyde	1970	
Unknown^{†}	Joe Costello	1957; 1959–1960	
Unknown^{†}	Joe Palardy	1976–1978	
Joe Bandiera	Joe Turco / Intercontinental Nobleman	1969-1979	
Unknown	John Davidson	1976–1977	
Unknown	John Gagne	1971	
Unknown^{†}	Johnny Heidman	1961; 1975	
Unknown	Johnny Reb	1972; 1983	
Unknown	José Martínez	1974–1975	
Unknown	José Quintero	1969	
Unknown	José Rivera	1971; 1973–1974	
Unknown	Juan Hernández	1955	
Unknown^{†}	Jules LaRance	1949–1950	
Unknown	Ken Hollis	1965	
Unknown^{†}	Ken Lucas	1978	
Unknown	Ken Nichols	1973	
Unknown	Ken Russell	1970	
Unknown^{†}	Ken Yates	1964; 1980	
Unknown^{†}	Krusher Karl Kovac	1987	
Unknown	Larry Lane	1979	
Unknown	Larry Power	1988	
Unknown	Larry Williams / Yukon Ike	1957–1959; 1963–1964	
Unknown	Leo Seitz	1972	
Unknown	Lone Eagle	1981; 1983	
Unknown	Lord Finis Hall	1951	
Unknown	Lou Britton	1950; 1952	
Unknown	Lou Spindola	1959–1960	
Unknown^{†}	Luis Martínez	1970; 1972	
Unknown	Marcel DuPont	1962	
Unknown^{†}	Mark Starr	1956; 1964–1966; 1968; 1970; 1973	
Unknown	Mario DeSouza	1956–1957	
Unknown^{†}	Mario Llanes	1957	
Unknown	M.E.B. / Man Eating Beast	1983–1984	
Unknown	Mickey Doyle	1973	
Unknown^{†}	Miguel Torres	1964	
Unknown	Mike Bond	1984–1985	
Unknown^{†}	Mike Loren	1972	
Unknown	Mile High Ross / Sky High Ross	1949–1950	
Unknown	The Monk	1981	
Unknown^{†}	Moose Evans	1964–1965; 1967	
Unknown^{†}	Nanjo Singh	1951	
Unknown	Nick Adams	1967; 1969; 1972	
Unknown	Nikita Mulkovich / Nikita Mulkovitch	1960–1962	
Unknown	Norvell Austin	1974	
Unknown	Otto Bowman	1954–1956	
Unknown	Otto Kuss	1948–1950; 1952	
Unknown	Pancho González	1952	
Unknown	Pat Rose	1986–1987	
Unknown	Paul DeGaulles	1961	
Unknown	Paul Kelly / The Outlaw	1983–1985	
Unknown	Pedro Escobar	1955	
Unknown^{†}	Pedro Valdez	1968	
Unknown^{†}	Pepe Gómez	1971	
Unknown	Pete Peterson	1949–1950	
Unknown	Pete Schuh	1948–1950	
Unknown	Pierre Florent	1952	
Unknown	Ralph Garibaldi	1948; 1950–1952; 1954–1955	
Unknown	Ramón Cernades	1956–1957	
Unknown	Randy Brewer	1976–1977	
Unknown	Raúl Guzmán	1975; 1980	
Unknown	Ray Durán / El Capitan	1958; 1961; 1965; 1972	
Unknown	Red McKim	1956–1957; 1970; 1972	
Unknown	Richard Moody	1964–1966; 1968–1970; 1972	
Unknown	Richard Sartain	1987	
Unknown	Rick Hamilton / Ricky Hamilton	1975	
Unknown^{†}	Rick Lancaster	1982	
Unknown	Rick Renaldo / Rico Valentino	1970; 1978	
Unknown	Ricky Lee	1960	
Unknown	Ricky Sexton / Cyclone Sexton	1958	
Unknown	Ritchie Magnett	1986	
Unknown	Roberto Gonzales	1963	
Unknown	Rock Hunter	1959–1960; 1963–1964; 1970–1971; 1979–1980	
Unknown	Roger McCune	1954	
Unknown	Ron McFarlane	1979–1982; 1986	
Unknown	Ron Powers	1987	
Unknown	Ron Sexton	1981	
Unknown^{†}	Ronnie Paul	1969–1971	
Unknown	Roy Bass	1972	
Unknown	Roy Collins	1961–1963	
Unknown	Sailor Moran	1957	
Unknown	Sam Cody	1987	
Unknown	Sammy Ford	1956; 1959	
Unknown	Sheik Abdullah / Ali Hassan	1983–1986	
Unknown	Sonny Driver	1979	
Unknown	Steve Brody	1977	
Unknown^{†}	Steve Casey	1948	
Unknown	Steve Druk	1966	
Unknown	Steve Estes	1987	
Unknown	Steve Hall	1979; 1981; 1983; 1985	
^{†}	Steve Lawler	1980–1981	
Unknown	Steve Regal	1981–1982	
Unknown	Tanui	1985	
Unknown	Taro Kobayashi	1973–1974	
Unknown	T.C. Carter	1987–1988	
Unknown	Ted Marshall	1953	
Unknown^{†}	Ted Oates	1974–1977; 1980; 1982; 1984	
Unknown	Terry Gunn	1985	
Unknown	Terry Orndorff	1982	
Unknown	T.G. Stone	1984–1985	
Unknown	Tiger Conway Jr. / Tiger Kit Conway / Kit Conway	1973–1974	
Unknown^{†}	Tito Carreon	1958	
Unknown	Tom Bradley	1953	
Unknown	Tom Clark / Blacksnake Clark	1961; 1964–1965	
Unknown	Tom DeMarco	1975	
Unknown	Tom Jones / Mr. Ebony	1981; 1983	
Unknown	Tom Shaft	1984	
Unknown^{†}	Tommy O'Toole	1950; 1956–1961	
Unknown	Tommy Sharpe	1979–1982; 1984; 1986	
Unknown	Tommy Wright	1986	
Unknown	Tommy Yates	1980	
Unknown	Tony Manos / Tony Manousos	1963–1964	
Unknown	Tony Martinez	1952–1953	
Unknown	Victor Rivera	1965–1967	
Unknown	Vito Martino	1975	
Unknown	Wakahi	1985	

== Female Wrestlers ==
Birth name	Ring name(s)	Tenure	Notes
Mary Alfonsi^{†}	Donna Christianello	1981	
Ethel Aschenbrenner^{†}	Ethel Brown	1955	
Barbara Baker	Barbara Baker	1955–1956; 1961–1963	
Joan Ballard	Jessica Rogers / Joan Ballard	1956–1965; 1967	
Nellya Baughman^{†}	Judy Grable	1963; 1980	
Winona Barkley^{†}	Winona Little Heart	1980; 1984	
Mildred Bliss^{†}	Mildred Burke	1948–1949; 1951–1954	
Barbara Boucher	Bette Boucher	1965	
Kathy Branch	Kathy Branch	1955	
Kathleen Bratcher^{†}	Ann Regan / Ann Reagan	1961–1964	
Bonnabel Burnquist^{†}	Bonnie Watson	1952; 1955–1956	
Lucille Ann Casey^{†}	Ann Casey	1971; 1975	
Elizabeth Chase^{†}	Liz Chase	1982–1983; 1985	
Mahala Coker	Judy Glover	1958–1962	
Carol Cook	Carol Cook	1951–1952; 1954–1956	
Dorothy Dotson	Dot Dotson	1948; 1950–1951; 1953–1956; 1959–1962	
Katherine Duvall	Elvira Snodgrass	1949–1951	
Mary Ellison^{†}	The Fabulous Moolah	1949; 1977; 1984	
Elizabeth J. Floyd^{†}	Betty Hawkins	1952; 1954–1957	
Mars Foreit^{†}	Mars Bennett	1950–1951; 1956	
Rachael Gargus	Rachel Dubois / Rachel Dubois	1973	
Betty Mae Garvey^{†}	Betty Weston / Mae Weston	1949	
Marva Goodwin^{†}	Babs Wingo	1953–1954; 1956; 1958; 1961; 1963	
Wilma Gordon	Rose Evans	1949	
Yolanda Gutierrez^{†}	Rita Cortez	1965	
Ethel Hairston^{†}	Ethel Johnson	1957, 1959	
Judy Hardee	Judy Martin	1980; 1984	
Rose Hesseltine	Rose Roman	1957	
Geneva Huckabee^{†}	The Lady Angel	1958	
Dixie Jordan	Princess Little Cloud	1967	
Karen Kellogg^{†}	Karen Kellogg	1963	
Mary Ann Kostecki^{†}	Penny Banner	1955–1956; 1958–1959; 1972	
LaChona LeClaire	LeeChona LaClaire	1956	
Peggy Lee	Peggy Lee	1982–1984	
Patricia Lyda	Pat Lyda	1961	
Laura Martin	Laura Martinez	1956–1960	
Shirley McClarty^{†}	Shirley Strimple	1949; 1956	
Susie Mae McCoy^{†}	Sweet Georgia Brown	1963–1964; 1966	
Suzanne Miller^{†}	Vivian St. John	1980	
Evelina Molina	Estela Molina	1972–1973	
Mary Jane Mull^{†}	Mary Jane Mull	1952; 1955–1956; 1958; 1966	
Velvet Mykietowich	Velvet McIntyre	1983	
Maria Nelson	Marie LaVerne	1971	
Helen Nevins^{†}	Helen Hild	1948–1949; 1952; 1958	
Betty Jo Niccoli	Betty Niccoli	1963–1976	
Mary Noble^{†}	Kay Noble	1957–1961; 1964–1972; 1976–1979	
Patricia Onaindia	Belle Starr	1955–1956; 1972	
Vickie Otis	Princess Victoria	1982–1983	
Joelene Parker	Sandy Parker	1969; 1974–1976; 1980	
Patricia Penry	Patty Neff	1955	
Cynthia Peretti^{†}	Princess Jasmine	1984	
Anna Pico	Ann LaVerne	1950–1951; 1954	
Tanya Lee Pope^{†}	Tanya West	1980	
Barbara Reeves	Barbara Galento	1971–1972	
Wendi Richter	Wendi Richter	1980–1982	
Candace Rummel^{†}	Candi Devine	1984–1985	
Elsie Schevchenko^{†}	Ella Waldek	1951–1954; 1956; 1959	
Brenda Sciarra^{†}	Brenda Britton	1987	
Brenda Scott	Brenda Scott	1963	
Ida Mae Selenkow^{†}	Ida Mae Martinez	1951–1952; 1955	
Patty Seymour	Leilani Kai	1977–1978; 1980; 1983	
DeAlva Sibly^{†}	June Byers	1948; 1950; 1952; 1954–1957	
Gloria Souza^{†}	Gloria Barattini	1951; 1954; 1959–1960	
Verdie Nell Stewart^{†}	Nell Stewart	1949; 1954–1955; 1959	
Cora Svonsteckik^{†}	Cora Combs	1952; 1955; 1965	
Debbie Szostecki	Debbie Combs	1980; 1985–1988	
Theresa Theis^{†}	Theresa Theis	1948; 1950–1953	
Betty Wade-Murphy	Joyce Grable	1978; 1981–1982	
Evelyn Wall^{†}	Evelyn Wall	1948	
Mercedes Waukago	Princess Tona Tomah	1959	
Doris Whitlock	Sabrina	1982	
Kathleen Wimbley	Kathleen Wimbley	1953–1954; 1956	
Jeri Wright	Corrine Cordero	1959	
Johnnie Young^{†}	Mae Young	1948; 1950–1951; 1954; 1959–1960; 1968	
Unknown	Ada Ash	1948; 1956–1957; 1959–1960	
Unknown	Adela Antone	1951	
Unknown	Ann Miller	1948; 1956	
Unknown	Annette Palmer	1964	
Unknown	Barbi Doll	1981	
Unknown	Belle Drummond	1956	
Unknown	Betsy Ross	1955–1956	
Unknown	Betty Ann Spencer	1963–1964	
Unknown	Betty White	1953–1954	
Unknown	Candy Malloy	1980–1981	
Unknown	Carmen Monge	1967–1968	
Unknown	Carol Sommers	1981	
Unknown	Catherine Simpson	1949	
Unknown	Catherine Simpson	1949	
Unknown^{†}	Celia Blevins	1949–1950	
Unknown	China Mira	1954–1956; 1959	
Unknown	Desiree Petersen	1984	
Unknown	Despina Montagas / Despina Montague	1986–1987	
Unknown^{†}	Diane Von Hoffman	1985	
Unknown	Doll Paige / Dolly Paige	1963–1964	
Unknown	Donna Marie Dieckman	1951; 1953	
Unknown	Early Dawn	1976; 1981–1982	
Unknown	Edith Wade	1956	
Unknown	Ellen Olsen	1950	
Unknown	Eva Lee	1950	
Unknown^{†}	Evelyn Stevens	1961–1962	
Unknown	Fifi LaRue	1964	
Unknown^{†}	Fran Gravette	1970	
Unknown	Gypsy Rose	1958	
Unknown^{†}	Jean Antone	1962–1980	
Unknown	Jeanette Collins	1957	
Unknown	Jill Fontaine	1981	
Unknown	Jo Ann Mullineaux	1951	
Unknown^{†}	Juanita Coffman	1949; 1954	
Unknown	Karen Merritt	1981	
Unknown	Kathy Starr / Penny Hawkins	1956–1964	
Unknown	Lois Johnson	1951	
Unknown^{†}	Lorraine Johnson	1952; 1956–1961	
Unknown	Louise Green	1954; 1956	
Unknown	Lucille Dupree	1966; 1969	
Unknown	Lulu Mae Provo	1956; 1961	
Unknown	Mae Goodson	1961	
Unknown	Marie Laveau	1977	
Unknown	Marina Rey	1973	
Unknown	Mars Monroe	1963	
Unknown^{†}	Marva Scott	1954; 1956; 1961; 1963; 1971	
Unknown^{†}	Mary Lou Ermine	1961	
Unknown	Millie Stafford	1951–1953; 1955–1956; 1958; 1960–1962	
Unknown	Olga Zepeda	1953–1955	
Unknown	Patty O'Hara	1969–1970	
Unknown	Peggy King	1958; 1960–1961; 1963	
Unknown	Penny Mitchell	1987	
Unknown	Pepper Torres	1980	
Unknown	Ramona Isbell	1961; 1963	
Unknown	Ramona TeSelle	1956–1957	
Unknown	Ruth Boatcallie	1951–1952; 1954	
Unknown	Sandra Partlowe / Princess Partlowe	1969–1971; 1973; 1980–1982; 1985; 1988	
Unknown	Sharon Brooks	1975–1976	
Unknown	Sharon Lass	1957	
Unknown	Shirley Black	1981; 1988	
Unknown	Suzette Ferrera	1978	
Unknown	Sylvia Hackney	1976	
Unknown	Terri Shane	1977; 1982–1983	
Unknown	Toni Rose	1965	
Unknown	Verne Bottoms	1966–1967	
Unknown	Vickie Adams	1963	
Unknown	Vicky Williams	1977	
Unknown	Violet Viann	1948–1950; 1952; 1954	

== Midget Wrestlers ==
Birth name	Ring name(s)	Tenure	Notes
Jonathan Adams^{†}	Little John / Ivan the Terrible	1974; 1977–1979; 1982; 1984–1985	
Shigeri Akabane^{†}	Little Tokyo	1973–1977; 1979–1981; 1983–1988	
William Bowman^{†}	Tom Thumb	1950–1958	
Robert Bradley^{†}	Cowboy Bradley	1955–1966; 1968; 1971	
Roger Butts	Brown Panther / Salie Halassie	1951–1954; 1956–1958	
Garry Culbreth^{†}	Tiny Tom	1980; 1982–1983	
Murray Downs^{†}	Little Bruiser	1967–1973	
Curtis Dudit	Coconut Willie	1979	
Steve Eisenhower	Butch Cassidy	1979–1980	
Marcel Gauthier^{†}	Sky Low Low	1950–1954; 1956–1957; 1964; 1966	
Jean Jacques Girard^{†}	Little Brutus / Tiny Tim	1955; 1959–1960; 1964; 1966	
Claude Giroux	Tiny Tim	1979	
Lionel Giroux^{†}	Little Beaver	1950–1957; 1966; 1968	
Katie Glass	Diamond Lil	1963; 1965–1967; 1970; 1976; 1981	
William Guillot^{†}	Billy the Kid	1965; 1972–1974; 1976; 1979–1981	
James Houghton^{†}	Beau Brummel / Bull Brummel	1957; 1959–1962	
Raymond Kessler	The Haiti Kid	1973–1974; 1977	
Harold Lang^{†}	Cowboy Lang	1967–1971; 1973–1977; 1979–1981; 1983–1986; 1988	
Stanley Littlejohn^{†}	Little Coco / Little Cocoa	1976; 1982–1985; 1988	
Sylvia McMillian	Darling Dagmar	1963; 1965–1967; 1970; 1976–1977	
Jean Roy	Tiny Roe	1950–1951; 1956–1964	
Raymond Sabourin^{†}	Pee Wee James	1950–1951; 1953–1957	
Leon Stap^{†}	Fuzzy Cupid	1951–1953; 1959; 1965–1966; 1969	
Richard Stephenson^{†}	Mighty Fritz / Mighty Schultz / Great Schultz	1950–1951; 1953–1954	
Roger Tomlin^{†}	Little Boy Blue	1962; 1965	
Eric Tovey^{†}	Lord Littlebrook	1955–1956; 1958–1961; 1967–1975; 1978–1979; 1984–1985	
Ferdinand Tucci^{†}	Pancho the Bull	1950–1951; 1953	
Louis Waterhouse Jr.	Little Louie	1973–1975	
Unknown	Baby Cheryl	1963–1964	
Unknown	Bobo Johnson / Little Bobo	1969; 1971–1976; 1978; 1980–1981; 1985	
Unknown	Chico Santana	1962; 1965	
Unknown	Cowboy Cassidy / Sonny Boy Cassidy	1951–1953; 1956–1957; 1965–1966	
Unknown	Gorgeous Jimmy Little	1950	
Unknown	The Jamaica Kid	1964; 1966	
Unknown	Karate Kid	1987–1988	
Unknown	Little Crusher	1969; 1972	
Unknown	Little Joey / Mighty Joey	1984	
Unknown	Mighty Atom	1967–1971	
Unknown	Pee Wee Lopez	1961–1962; 1965–1966	
Unknown	Sam Thomas	1963–1964	
Unknown	Sonny Boy Hayes	1975–1976	
Unknown	Tiger Jackson	1953–1954	
Unknown	Tito Infante	1954; 1956–1957	
Unknown	Vittorio Gonzales	1951–1953	
Unknown^{†}	Wee Willie Wilson	1968–1969; 1971–1973; 1977; 1982	

== Stables and Tag Teams ==
Tag Team/Stable(s)	Members	Tenure(s)
American Starship	American Starship Coyote and American Starship Eagle	1985
The Batten Twins	Bart Batten and Brad Batten	1985–1987
The Battling Duseks	Emil Dusek and Ernie Dusek	1951–1960
The Blackjacks	Blackjack Mulligan and Blackjack Lanza	1983–1984
The California Hippies	Mike Boyette and Mickey Doyle	1973
The Dusek Brothers	Ernie Dusek and Joe Dusek	1949
The Dusek Riot Squad	Emil Dusek, Ernie Dusek, Joe Dusek and Rudy Dusek	1953–1954; 1956–1957
The Fabulous Freebirds	Michael Hayes, Buddy Roberts, Terry Gordy and Jimmy Garvin	1981–1982; 1984
The Flying Scotts	George Scott and Sandy Scott	1960
The Grapplers	Grappler#1 and Grappler#2	1984
House of Humperdink	Gene Lewis, Hercules Hernandez, The Monk, Superfly, Chang Chung & Ten-Gu, and Sir Oliver Humperdink	1981–1982
The Interns	Intern #1 and Intern #2	1974–1975
The Japanese Wrecking Crew	Yasu Fuji and Oki Shikina	1975
Kansas City Vice	George South and Rocky King	1986
The Kansas Outlaws	Bobby Jaggers and Psycho Sam	1987
The Kelly Twins	Pat Kelly and Mike Kelly	1981
The LaRances	Johnny LaRance and Jules LaRance	1949
The Martins	Terry Martin and Tommy Martin	1968–1970; 1975
The McGuire Twins	Benny McGuire and Billy McGuire	1973
The Medics	Medic #1 and Medic #2	1961; 1963
The Midnight Express	Bobby Eaton and Dennis Condrey	1985–1987
The MOD Squad	Basher and Spike	1986–1987
The Montana Cowboys	Mike Stone and Rick Patterson	1987–1988
The New Chain Gang	Chris Colt and Moondog Moretti	1986
The Oates Brothers	Jerry Oates and Ted Oates	1974–1976; 1980; 1984
The Outlaws	Dick Murdoch and Dusty Rhodes	1968–1969; 1975; 1980
The Power Twins	David Power and Larry Power	1988
The Road Warriors	Road Warrior Hawk and Road Warrior Animal	1984; 1986
The Rock 'n' Roll Express	Ricky Morton and Robert Gibson	1984–1986
The Rat Pack	Bobby Jaggers, Buzz Tyler and J. J. Dillon	1980–1981
The Midnight Rockers	Marty Jannetty and Shawn Michaels	1985–1986
The Rock & Roll Rebels	Rock & Roll Rebel #1 and Rock & Roll Rebel #2	1987
The Sharpe Brothers	Ben Sharpe and Mike Sharpe	1949
Sheik Abdullah the Great's Army	The Animal, M.E.B., Tarzan Goto, Akio Sato, Gypsy Joe, Mr. Pogo, 666, Edcar Thomas and Sheik Abdullah the Great	1984
The Shieks	Abdullah the Great and Roger Kirby	1983
The Success Express	Bobby Jaggers and Moondog Moretti	1986
The Thunderfoots	Thunderfoot#1 and Thunderfoot #2	1986
The Uptown Boys	Marty Jannetty and Tommy Rogers	1984
The Wild Samoans	Afa and Sika	1978

== Managers and Valets ==
Birth Name:	Ring Name(s):	Tenure:	Notes
Jake Brown	Jeffries	1956–1959	
Phil Buckley^{†}	Colonel Buck Robley	1977–1978; 1981; 1983–1984	
Paul Ellering	Paul Ellering	1984; 1986	
Albion Friend^{†}	Percival A. Friend	1972–1973 1976	
James Hart	Jimmy Hart	1984	
Raymond Heenan^{†}	Bobby Heenan	1969	
Kenneth Johnson	Slick	1985–1986	
Bruno Lauer	Downtown Bruno	1987	
John Sutton^{†}	Sir Oliver Humperdink	1981–1982	
Unknown	Angel	1984	
Unknown^{†}	Dr. Ken Ramey	1974–1975	
Unknown	Honey	1984	
Unknown^{†}	Miss Brenda Britton	1987	
Unknown	Mr. Russell Sapp, Esq.	1984; 1988	

== Commentators and interviewers ==
Birth name:	Ring name(s):	Tenure:	Notes
Martin Boroditsky	Marty Goldstein	1988	
Jay French	Jay French	1987–1988	
William Grigsby^{†}	Bill Grigsby		
Bill Kersten	Bill Kersten	1956–1982	
Robert Rhodes^{†}	Rick Stuart	1984–1988	
Kevin Wahl	Kevin Wall	1984–1986	

== Other personnel ==
Birth name:	Ring name(s):	Tenure:	Notes
Orville Brown^{†}	Orville Brown	1948–1958	Promoter
Pearl Christy^{†}	Pearl Christy	1948–1952	Promoter
George Petraski^{†}	George Petraski	1985–1988	Promoter
George Simpson^{†}	George Simpson	1948–1969	Promoter
Robert Geigel^{†}	Bob Geigel	1963–1986; 1987–1988	Promoter
Jim Crockett, Jr.^{†}	Jim Crockett, Jr.	1986–1987	

Company name to Year
Company name:	Years:
NWA Central States	1948–1963
Central States Wrestling / Heart of America Sports Attractions	1963–1986
World Wrestling Alliance	1987–1988
Notes
^{†} Indicates they are deceased.
^{‡} Indicates they died while they were employed with NWA Central States.
