= 1961 in professional wrestling =

1961 in professional wrestling describes the year's events in the world of professional wrestling.

== List of notable promotions ==
Only two promotions held notable shows in 1961.

Promotion Name	Abbreviation
Southwest Sports	Southwest Sports
Empresa Mexicana de Lucha Libre	EMLL

== Calendar of notable shows ==
Date	Promotion(s)	Event	Location	Main Event
January 31	Southwest Sports	Parade of Champions	Irving, Texas	Pat O'Connor (c) wrestled Dory Dixon to a draw in a two out of three falls match for the NWA World Heavyweight Championship
April	EMLL	5. Aniversario de Arena México	Mexico City, Mexico	
September 22	EMLL	EMLL 28th Anniversary Show	Mexico City, Mexico	Gory Guerrero (c) defeated Ray Mendoza in a best two-out-of-three falls match for the NWA World Light Heavyweight Championship
(c) – denotes defending champion(s)

== Championship changes ==
=== EMLL ===
NWA World Light Heavyweight Championship
incoming champion - Gory Guerrero
No title changes

NWA World Middleweight Championship
incoming champion – René Guajardo
Date	Winner	Event/Show	Note(s)
December 2	Antonio Posa	EMLL show	

NWA World Welterweight Championship
incoming champion – Karloff Lagarde
No title changes

Mexican National Heavyweight Championship
incoming champion - Vacant
No title changes

Mexican National Middleweight Championship
incoming champion – El Santo
No title changes

Mexican National Lightweight Championship
incoming champion – Juan Diaz
No title changes

Mexican National Light Heavyweight Championship
incoming champion – Rubén Juárez
No title changes

Mexican National Welterweight Championship
incoming champion – Karloff Lagarde
No title changes

Mexican National Tag Team Championship
incoming champion – possibly Tarzán López and Henry Pilusso
No title changes

Mexican National Women's Championship
incoming champion – Uncertain
No title changes

=== NWA ===
NWA Worlds Heavyweight Championship
Incoming Champion – Pat O'Connor
Date	Winner	Event/Show	Note(s)
June 30	Buddy Rogers	NWA show	

== Debuts ==
- Debut date uncertain:
  - The Beast
  - Ernie Ladd
  - Gino Brito
  - Ivan Koloff
  - Jack Lanza
  - Jonathan Boyd
  - Luke Graham
  - S. D. Jones
  - Spiros Arion
  - Tony Parisi
  - Wahoo McDaniel
  - Jean Antone
- April – Umanosuke Ueda
- July 4 – Les Thatcher
- July 16 – Dr. Wagner
- October 11 - Masio Koma (JWA)

== Births ==
- Date of birth uncertain:
  - Penny Mitchell
  - Eli the Eliminator
- January 24:
  - Reggie Bennett
  - Kōji Iibashi
  - Vince Russo
- February 1 – Sean Royal
- February 9 – Chris Walker
- February 17 – Chris Champion(died in 2018)
- February 21 – Rhonda Singh(died in 2001)
- March 9 – Rick Steiner
- March 17 – La Fiera(died in 2010)
- March 27 – Octagón
- April 11 – Nobuaki Kakuda
- April 15 – Volk Han
- April 18 – Brooklyn Brawler
- April 23 – Terry Gordy(died in 2001)
- April 25 – Wendell Cooley
- April 28 – Billy Joe Travis(died in 2002)
- May 4 – Scott Armstrong
- May 5 – Hiroshi Hase
- May 8 – Akira Taue
- May 11 – Paul Diamond
- May 13 – Dennis Rodman
- May 14 – Tommy Rogers(died in 2015)
- May 16 – The Godfather
- May 25 – Hiro Saito
- June 9:
  - Bull Pain
  - Despina Montagas
- June 15 – Scott Norton
- June 21 – Count Grog
- July 9 – Damián 666
- July 13 – Chris Michaels
- July 25 – Jaguar Yokota
- July 28 – Ciclón Ramírez
- July 30 – El Brazo (died in 2013)
- August 10 – Solomon Grundy (died in 2025)
- August 13 – Tony Falk
- August 14 – Eddie Gilbert(died in 1995)
- August 17 – Buddy Landel(died in 2015)
- August 25 – Nick Kiniski
- September 1 – Bam Bam Bigelow(died in 2006)
- September 2 – Mongolian Mauler(died in 2024)
- September 6 – Wendi Richter
- September 8 – Rex King(died in 2017)
- September 16 – Phil LaFon
- September 17 Jim Cornette
- October 1:
  - Súper Astro
  - Rico Constantino
- October 3 – Maxx Payne
- October 4 – Bobby Fulton
- October 11 – Tony Chimel
- October 14 – Tom Burton (died in 2010)
- October 23:
  - Ron Harris
  - Don Harris
- November 8 – Isao Takagi
- November 19 – Rick Bassman
- November 26 – Ivory (wrestler)
- December 19 – Reggie White(died in 2004)
- December 21 – The Patriot (died in 2021)
- December 24 – Peter Smit (died in 2005)
- December 30 –Armand Rougeau

== Deaths ==
- January 9 – Oyama Kato, 42
- February 18 – Chick Garibaldi, 46
- October 7 – Al Mills 50/51
- November 8 – Blimp Levy, 56
