= Thunderfoot =

Thunderfoot may refer to:

== Nickname ==
- Thunderf00t, the pseudonym of the British chemist and video blogger Phil Mason (born 1972)
- Thunderfoot (wrestler), Joel Deaton (born 1957), American professional wrestler from the Thunderfoots
  - Gene Ligon, the second of the Thunderfoots; See List of former Central States Wrestling personnel
- Hwang Jang-lee (born 1944), Japanese-born Korean martial artist and film actor

=== American football punters ===
- Herman Weaver (born 1948)
- Jerrel Wilson (1941–2005)
- Lee Johnson (punter) (born 1961)

== Fictional entities ==
- Littlefoot, a character in The Land Before Time, originally called Thunderfoot
- Thunderfoot, the indigenous American clan of T. Hawk in the Street Fighter series
- Thunderfoot, in the list of DC Comics characters: B
- Col. Thunderfoot, a rabbit colonel in List of Fables characters
- Thunderfoot, a chasmosaurus in the Dinotopia series

== Music ==
- "Thunderfoot", a track on the album Sudan Village by Seals & Crofts
- Thunderfoot, a Southern hard-rock band formed by Kevin Fowler
- Thunderfoot, an album by Hobo Jim

== See also ==
- Thunder, in the List of Watership Down characters
