= Happy Humphrey =

American professional wrestler (1926–1989)

Personal information
- Born: William Joseph Cobb; July 16, 1926 Payne, Georgia, US
- Died: March 14, 1989 (aged 62) Augusta, Georgia, US
- Spouse: Ruby Watts
- Parents: Ralph Ernest Cobb; Etta Dover

Professional wrestling career
- Ring name: Happy Humphrey
- Billed height: 6 ft 1 in (185 cm)
- Billed weight: 802 lb (364 kg)
- Debut: 1953
- Retired: 1962

William Joseph Cobb (July 16, 1926 – March 14, 1989), best known by his ring and screen names of Happy Humphrey, Happy Farmer Humphrey, and "Squasher" Humphrey, was an American professional wrestler, known as the heaviest professional wrestler of all time. His most active period was in the 1950s and 1960s when he billed himself as "the world's largest wrestler". Humphrey averaged 750 lb (340 kg) during his career. Several times, he weighed in at over 800 lb (360 kg), and on one occasion he weighed over 900 lb (410 kg).

== Professional wrestling career ==
Humphrey, who at the time was working on a farm where he was known for his uncommon strength, began his wrestling career in 1953 by wrestling a bear for 28 minutes. For about eight years, Humphrey wrestled a number of matches, some of them televised, often against Haystacks Calhoun who regularly weighed over 600 lb (270 kg) himself. Humphrey's most notable match was a sold-out main event against Calhoun at Madison Square Garden, promoted by Vince McMahon Sr.

Humphrey's promoters had a 1951 Pontiac heavily modified to carry the wrestler around: seats were removed and extra shocks were installed to support Humphrey's enormous weight (and also as a gimmick). In addition, he was usually weighed before matches on meat scales at rendering facilities.

In 1960, Humphrey met future multiple NWA World Champion Harley Race, who was only 17 at the time. Race, who was just beginning his own career, was hired as Humphrey's driver and he also wrestled Humphrey on multiple occasions. Race earned $5 per day, plus room and board, for driving Humphrey, and $25 for each match he wrestled with Humphrey. According to Race, Humphrey was so large that normal showers could not accommodate him. As a result, Humphrey was obliged to lie naked on the ground while Race would apply liquid soap to his body, scrub him with a mop and then rinse him off with a garden hose. Race also stated that Humphrey, who taught Race how to take bumps properly, was a very kind person and one of the few wrestlers of his era who took the time to sign an autograph for everyone and to socialize with fans.

Humphrey estimated he travelled 90,000 miles a year from 1956 to 1962.

== Outside wrestling ==
Humphrey had difficulty fitting in with regular society due to his great size. People stared at him on the street, and he was often refused service at restaurants. In one incident in Alabama, he became stuck in a telephone booth and eight police officers were required to extract him. In another incident (this time in New Orleans), Humphrey attended a movie and became stuck in the theater seat. Welders had to cut the seats around him in order to get him out. Towards the end of his regular career, he recognized his problem and had an operation to remove 100 lb (45 kg) of fat from his body; however, he gained the weight back soon afterwards.

He told Wrestling World magazine that his vast eating habits - including two dozen eggs, three plates of toast, and two pounds of ham, with about two gallons of milk for breakfast - would cost him the equivalent of $320 a day.

== Doctor-regulated lifestyle ==
In 1962, Humphrey was forced into early retirement due to a heart condition. After retiring, his weight ballooned to over 900 lb (410 kg). At this weight, he would tire after about 10 steps and have to sit down (in two chairs). Humphrey attempted to control his eating habits (which sometimes included eating up to 15 whole chickens in one sitting), but after consulting with doctors, he decided to volunteer for obesity research and checked himself into the Medical College of Georgia's Clinical Investigation Unit in Augusta. Upon entering the clinic, he weighed 802 lb (364 kg).

For two years, Humphrey followed a strict doctor-controlled diet regimen. He was not allowed to exercise (in order to avoid fluid loss via sweat) and was confined to the air-conditioned clinic itself. The regimen included strictly measured amounts of food and water, with about 1,000 calories total per day and a rotation in 56-day cycles. The first cycle consisted of high-protein foods, including eggs, skim milk, ground beef, margarine with toast, tomato soup, ketchup, peas, and applesauce. The next cycle was high-carbohydrate, including toast, corn, lima beans, shortbread, peaches, applesauce, pineapple, puffed rice, skim milk, grape juice, orange juice, and small amounts of sugar. The third cycle was a high-fat diet: salt-free mayonnaise and butter, tomatoes, eggs, whipped cream, and cream cheese.

== Massive weight loss and obesity study ==
In the spring of 1965, Humphrey left the clinic where he had lived the previous two years. He weighed a comparatively healthy 232 lb (105 kg), a total loss of 570 lb (260 kg) since he was admitted. Humphrey won a place in the Guinness Book of World Records for this weight loss. Humphrey also appeared on CBS's I've Got A Secret, a non-celebrity spin-off of What's My Line?.

According to the two-year study headed up by Unit Director Dr. Wayne Greenberg, Humphrey's weight loss on each of the three diets was approximately the same; however, the nature of the actual body matter lost during each differed significantly. The vast majority of the weight lost on the high-protein diet was body fat and Humphrey's hunger was satisfied for longer periods between meals as well. On the high-fat regimen, about two-thirds of the weight lost was body fat with the rest being water, with an undesirable side effect of high blood cholesterol. On the carbohydrate-based diet, half of the weight lost consisted of body fat and the other half was water and muscle tissue. Greenberg noted at the end of the study that dieters who only use a scale as a means of determining weight loss cannot tell how much of what they lose is body fat and how much is water and muscle tissue.

== Life after the study ==
After leaving the clinic, Humphrey got a job at an Augusta, Georgia shoe-repair shop and never returned to the ring. He stated that he missed the sport and mixing it up with other wrestlers but was looking forward to a new life as a normal-sized individual.

In 1975, Humphrey appeared in the film Moonrunners as "Tiny the Syndicate Man". The TV show The Dukes of Hazzard was based on this film.

In later years, Humphrey regained much of his weight and died of a heart attack on March 14, 1989. At the time of his death, he weighed over 600 lb (270 kg). He was buried at Southlawn Cemetery, Aiken County, South Carolina.

== See also ==
- Man Mountain Mike and The McGuire Twins, who, along with Calhoun, wrestled under similar superheavyweight gimmicks as Cobb in the years following his retirement
