= Mongolian Mauler =

American professional wrestler (1961–2024)

Personal information
- Born: Peter Raymond Miller; September 2, 1961 Rochester, New York, U.S.
- Died: January 22, 2024 (aged 62) Noblesville, Indiana

Professional wrestling career
- Ring name(s): Mongolian Mauler; Peter Flowers; Crazy Pete; El Mongol; Khalka Bear; Oscar Strongbo
- Billed height: 6 ft 0 in (183 cm)
- Billed weight: 301 lb (137 kg)
- Billed from: Ulan Bator, Mongolia
- Trained by: Killer Kowalski
- Debut: 1980
- Retired: 1994

Peter Raymond Miller (September 2, 1961 – January 22, 2024), was an American professional wrestler better known by his ring name The Mongolian Mauler. He mainly worked in Vancouver, World Championship Wrestling, Japan and various international promotions.

== Professional wrestling career ==
Miller began his wrestling career in 1980 after being trained by Killer Kowalski. In 1983, Miller made his debut for NWA All-Star Wrestling in Vancouver as Peter Flowers teaming with his brother Timothy Flowers until 1984.

He later became The Mongolian Mauler where he worked in many countries in England, South Africa, Japan, Germany, India, Jordan and Mexico.

Mauler had a brief stint in Smoky Mountain Wrestling in 1992. In 1994, he worked for World Championship Wrestling being managed by Col. Robert Parker. Mauler teamed up a couple of times with Steve Austin. Mauler lost to Brian Pillman, Dustin Rhodes and Sting. He retired later that year.

== Death ==
Mauler died on January 22, 2024, at 62. He suffered from many health issues in the last few years of his life. He was in a wheelchair and had congenital heart issues. Also had gotten pneumonia and an infection in his lung.

== Championships and accomplishments ==
- Pro Wrestling Illustrated
  - PWI ranked him # 483 of the 500 best singles wrestlers of the PWI 500 in 1992
  - PWI ranked him # 257 of the 500 best singles wrestlers of the PWI 500 in 1993
  - PWI ranked him # 346 of the 500 best singles wrestlers of the PWI 500 in 1994
  - PWI ranked him # 493 of the 500 best singles wrestlers of the PWI 500 in 1995
