= The McGuire Twins =

Professional wrestling tag team

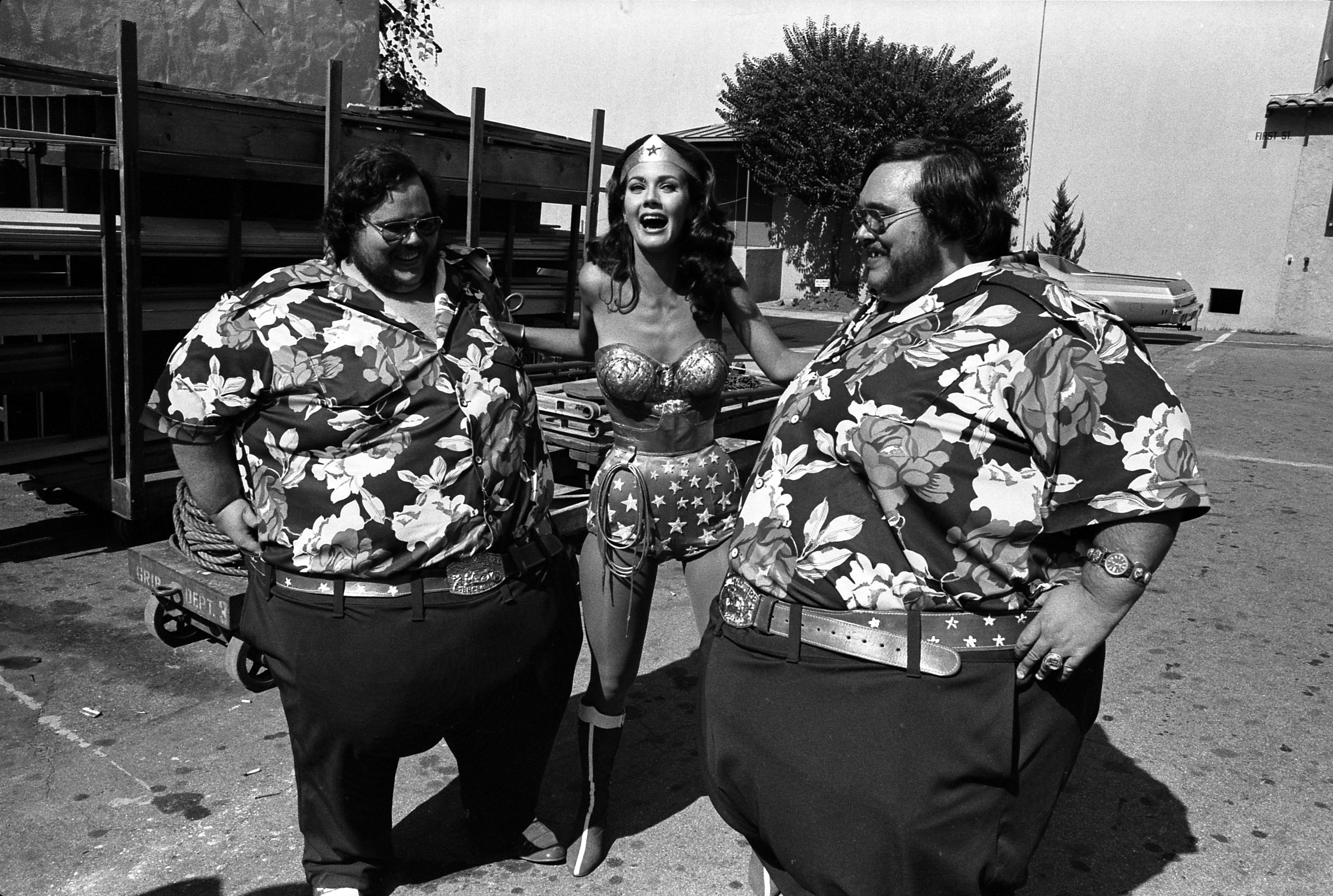
- Benny (left) and Billy with Lynda Carter on the set of Wonder Woman.

Tag team
- Name(s): The McCrary Twins; The McGuire Twins "World's Heaviest Twins"
- Members: Billy McCrary; Benny McCrary; George Cannon (manager)
- Combined billed weight: 666 kg (1,468 lb) (Billy and Benny McCrary)
- Hometown: Hendersonville, North Carolina
- Debut: 1971; 55 years ago
- Disbanded: 1978; 48 years ago
- Trained by: Gory Guerrero

Billy Leon McCrary (December 7, 1946 – July 14, 1979) and Benny Loyd McCrary (December 7, 1946 – March 26, 2001), known together as The McCrary Twins or under their stage name as The McGuire Twins, were American professional wrestlers and sideshow performers listed in the Guinness Book of World Records as the "World's Heaviest Twins" (727 pounds (330 kg) and 747 pounds (339 kg), respectively).

== Biographies ==
The twins were born premature in Hendersonville, North Carolina on December 7, 1946. They contracted rubella (German measles) when they were 4 years old, which caused problems for their pituitary glands and they started rapidly gaining weight. Their parents bought a farm to increase their physical activity and they reportedly ate only 1,000 calories per day but could not stop gaining weight due to their metabolic problems. They each weighed 200 pounds (91 kg) by age 10 and 600 pounds (270 kg) by age 16. They dropped out of high school and moved to Texas, where they had jobs livestock branding.

They spent three years working at the Circus Circus Las Vegas, then performed their minibike routine for a few months in Los Angeles. A wrestling promoter saw them in El Paso, Texas, and convinced them to begin a wrestling training program in Ciudad Juárez, Mexico, lifting weights and running often. In December 1971, at age 25, they made their in-ring debuts in Texas, losing to Bull Ramos and Ciclón Negro.

From 1974 to 1978, they participated in several matches in Japan, organized by New Japan Pro-Wrestling, defeating other notable wrestling tag teams, including Kantaro Hoshino and Seiji Sakaguchi, as well as Osamu Kido and Riki Choshu. They used the stage name McGuire, since it was easier for Japanese ring announcers to pronounce.

The twins often used a finishing move called the "Tupelo Splash", which involved one of the twins diving belly-first onto a prone opponent; they would follow this with "The Steamroller", where the twin would roll back and forward over the opponent.

Billy McCrary died on July 14, 1979, at the age of 32, following a motorcycle accident in Niagara Falls, Ontario, en route to a Ripley's Believe It or Not! museum.

After Billy's death, Benny tried to continue wrestling, partnering with André the Giant, but was not successful without his brother. Benny subsequently retired from pro wrestling and then opened a pawn shop and worked as an auctioneer in Hendersonville. He later moved to Walkertown, North Carolina, and worked for the Christian Golfers Ministry. The cartilage in his knee wore out and he was eventually bedridden.

Benny died at age 54 on March 26, 2001, of heart failure. The brothers are buried side by side in a graveyard near Hendersonville. Their gravestone displays images of two Honda motorcycles and is inscribed "World’s Largest Twins".

== Personal lives ==
The twins were married to sisters Maryse and Danielle Juarry, whom they met in Montreal. Benny was an evangelical Christian and enjoyed golf, playing until he was bedridden.

== See also ==
- List of the heaviest people
- List of premature professional wrestling deaths
- Obesity
