= Blimp Levy =

American professional wrestler (c. 1903 – 1961)

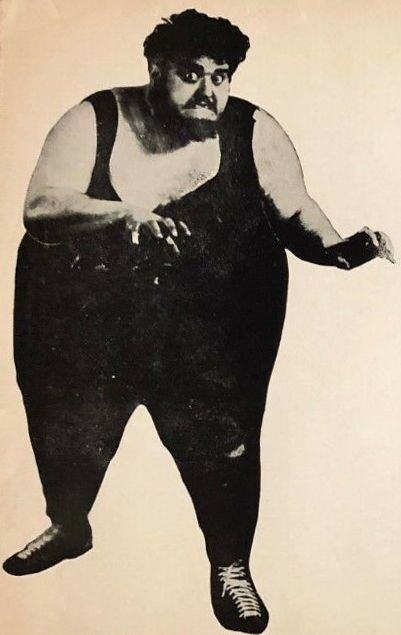

Personal information
- Born: Martin Levy; April 30, 1905 Boston, Massachusetts
- Died: November 8, 1961 (aged 56) Prattville, Alabama
- Spouse: Charlotte Jones (m. 1946)

Professional wrestling career
- Ring name(s): Blimp Levy, Martin 'The Blimp' Levy, El Globo Humano
- Billed weight: 642 lb (291 kg)
- Billed from: Boston, Massachusetts
- Debut: November 1933 in Boston
- Retired: 1951

Martin Levy (April 30, 1905 – November 8, 1961), better known by his ring name Blimp Levy or simply The Blimp, was an American professional wrestler who was a major attraction on the wrestling circuit in the 1930s and 40s. Regarded as the largest wrestler of his time, The Boston Globe stated, "there’s no one challenging his claim to being the world’s biggest", while the New York World-Telegram called Levy "the most meat which ever stepped into a ring". In his heyday, promoter Jack Pfefer stated that "no living wrestler today can outdraw the human Blimp."

== Early life ==
Levy was born and raised in Boston. A large person from his early days, Levy (who was Jewish) weighed 200lbs at his bar mitzvah and over 350lbs during high school. He had a brief stint playing football but had to leave his school team after injuring several opponents and linesmen. Prior to entering professional wrestling, he worked as part of a side show.

== Professional wrestling career ==
Levy was discovered by prominent wrestling promoter Jack Pfefer while he was working as the "fat man" in a Coney Island side show. Pfefer would promote Levy into the 1930s and 40s. Though famed for his massive bulk, fellow wrestler Paul Boesch stated in his autobiography that Levy was surprisingly agile for his size. Boesch recalled a story of Levy successfully kicking a metal can which was dangling approximately six feet off the ground. Levy was able to tap the can with his foot while standing, which impressed his fellow wrestlers, many of whom could not do the same without falling.

Levy wrestled throughout the United States territories, defeating wrestlers such as Tor Johnson, Nature Boy Buddy Rogers and Gorgeous George. Pfefer also pitched Levy to promoters in Australia, stating in 1948 that "all that you have to do is use him as an extra few minutes exhibition and I am more than sure that the Blimp will sell out every arena... as he has proven that in this country".

On January 21, 1947, in Baltimore, Levy wrestled boxer-turned-wrestler Primo Carnera, who had been boxing's World Heavyweight Champion from 1933 to 1934.

During his career, Levy was interviewed for and featured in various national US magazines and newspapers, including the October 1936 edition of Time magazine.

== Later life and death ==
By the mid-1940s Levy's health was failing. The Connecticut State Athletic Commission revoked his professional wrestling license on the recommendation of physicians who examined him. Following this, Levy briefly performed abroad in Malaysia and Singapore, wrestling Dara Singh among other famed South Asian wrestlers.

Levy's career came to an end around 1951, though he continued to make promotional appearances. Billed as The 944-pound Fat Man, prior to a September 19, 1961 appearance at the 54th Annual Tennessee State Fair, Levy suffered a mild heart attack in his trailer only to return to the stage before the end of the fair's run.

Levy died less than two months later on November 8, 1961, in his Alabama trailer park home at the age of 58, reportedly weighing 900 pounds.

== Personal life ==
Levy married several times. He married Charlotte Jones in 1946 in Dallas, Texas. A few years prior, he had married Juanita Thomas. Unbeknownst to Levy, Thomas was already married at the time. Though separated, she had never obtained a divorce. The relationship ended in 1945, with Levy stating that Thomas was physically abusive towards him.

In an interview with The Washington Post in 1946, Levy discussed the eating habits which contributed to his size. He stated that some mornings he would "eat a dozen eggs, and then again, sometimes only two. Sometimes I eat six pounds of steak, and then I might eat a pound." He also spoke of eating large amounts of mashed potatoes, requiring a half bushel of potatoes, a pound of butter, and two quarts of milk.

== Legacy ==
One of the early Jews in professional wrestling, Levy was honored as part of the Yiddish Fight Club exhibit at the YIVO Institute for Jewish Research in Manhattan, New York. He is regarded as one of the first "giants" of professional wrestling, paving the way for similar attractions like Giant Haystacks and Man Mountain Mike.
