= AWA Championship Wrestling =

American professional wrestling TV series

- Created by: American Wrestling Association
- Starring: AWA roster
- Country of origin: United States
- Original language: English

Production
- Camera setup: Multi-camera setup

Original release
- Network: ESPN
- Release: 1985 – 1990

AWA Championship Wrestling is a professional wrestling television series that aired on cable sports network ESPN from 1985 to 1990. It was a continuation of the earlier ESPN program Pro Wrestling USA, the co-operative venture between the American Wrestling Association (AWA) and several National Wrestling Alliance (NWA) affiliates (most notably Jim Crockett Promotions). On February 26, 2008, ESPN Classic began reairing AWA Championship Wrestling episodes. Along with the ownership of the AWA intellectual property by the WWE, all episodes are available on the WWE Network.

== Overview ==
In September 1985, the AWA began airing weekly programming on ESPN, giving the promotion the national exposure already enjoyed by the World Wrestling Federation (on USA Network) and the NWA's Georgia/World Championship Wrestling (on TBS). However, weekly AWA shows were not treated with any priority by the cable network, sometimes being delayed, preempted by live programming, or suffering from occasional changes in time slot, making it difficult for fans to tune in on a regular basis. Following the disastrous Team Challenge Series, the AWA lost its contract with ESPN and became virtually inactive by late 1990.

=== Taping locations ===
For many years, the AWA held their television tapings in their home base of Minneapolis, Minnesota (for their syndicated All-Star Wrestling program), at the WTCN television studios. However, in early 1985, AWA promoter Verne Gagne made the decision to hold some television tapings at the Tropicana Hotel in Atlantic City, New Jersey. When Gagne signed the deal with ESPN later that same year, he along with the ESPN management felt that another location for the AWA television tapings was necessary. Ultimately, Gagne and ESPN settled on the Showboat Sports Pavilion in Las Vegas, Nevada. Both the WWF on the USA Network and the NWA on TBS were able to draw more crowds than the AWA's ESPN program. The ESPN tapings in Las Vegas often took place in front of small, silent crowds. In 1989, they taped from the Rochester, Minnesota Civic Center until their final taping on August 11, 1990.

=== Commentators ===
Rod Trongard's voice was featured on the AWA's weekly ESPN broadcasts, reaching millions of homes around the world. His signature phrase was "From coast to coast, continent to continent, and border to border". During broadcasts, he often included city names in the phrase, signifying the broad reach of wrestling and the AWA's broadcasts at the time. Trongard called matches alongside fellow commentators Lord James Blears and Lee Marshall. Ralph Strangis' earliest national exposure was as play-by-play man and ring announcer for the American Wrestling Association on ESPN, where he worked alongside Lee Marshall, and later Eric Bischoff, in the waning days of that promotion.

=== Notable moments ===
1986

- A 1986 main event from Showboat Sports Pavilion of Jimmy "Superfly" Snuka, Greg Gagne and Curt Hennig vs. Doug Somers with Sherri Martel, Larry Zbyszko and Colonel DeBeers for Six Man Tag Team Match.
- A 1986 main event of Buddy Rose and Doug Somers with Sherri Martel vs. Curt Hennig and Scott Hall with Michael Buffer as ring announcer.
- The March 4, 1986, main event (from Showboat Sports Pavilion) of Jerry Blackwell vs. Boris Zhukov, and Doug Somers vs. Scott Hall with Curt Hennig as AWA World Tag-Team Champions. Plus the sitdown interview of Marty Jannetty with Larry Zbyszko and Larry Nelson.
- The July 22, 1986, the interview of Curt Hennig with Larry Hennig and Larry Nelson.
- The September 16, 1986, main event from Showboat Sports Pavilion of Nick Bockwinkel vs. Boris Zhukov.
- The September 23, 1986, main event of Colonel DeBeers vs Scott Hall, and the interview of Curt Hennig and Scott Hall.
- The October 12, 1986, main event from Showboat Sports Pavilion of Curt Hennig vs. Larry Zbyszko with Mr. Go.
- By the near end of 1986, Curt Hennig was deemed the top challenger to AWA World Champion Nick Bockwinkel. The ever relentless Hennig wrestled Bockwinkel to a one-hour draw in a match seen nationwide on ESPN.

1987

- In the spring of 1987, Sherri Martel began managing Kevin Kelly. Her most memorable moment as his manager came when she interfered in an arm wrestling match between Kelly and Tommy Rich on AWA Championship Wrestling. Rich got immediate revenge by cornering the escaping Martel and ripping her dress off to reveal a strapless pink teddy and black stockings. In the following weeks, Rich would come to ringside during Kelly's matches and taunt Martel with her stolen dress.
- In 1987, Nick Bockwinkel took on Curt Hennig.
- A 1987 interview of Curt Hennig with Greg Gagne and Larry Nelson.
- In 1987, Greg Gagne took on Curt Hennig with Larry Zbyszko at ringside.
- In 1987, Wahoo McDaniel was brought into the AWA to challenge Curt Hennig for the World Title in a series of ultra stiff brawls. Ultimately, Hennig emerged victorious in the feud by beating McDaniel in an Indian Strap match seen nationwide on ESPN.

1988

- A 1988 interview of The Nasty Boys.
- A 1988 interview of Ricky Morton.
- A 1988 interview of Colonel DeBeers with Diamond Dallas Page, Diamond Doll and Lee Marshall
- A 1988 match of Jerry Lawler vs. Samoan Joe (not to be confused with the more well-known Samoa Joe).
- In 1988, Baron von Raschke took on Curt Hennig.
- A 1988 main event of Sgt. Slaughter vs. Boris Zhukov with Teijho Khan on national television.
- In 1988, Soldat Ustinov with Teijho Khan took on Jerry Lawler.
- In 1988, Badd Company took on the Midnight Rockers on national television.
- In 1988, Teijho Khan with Soldat Ustinov took on Jerry Lawler.
- A 1988 main event of The Nasty Boys took on The Rock 'n' Roll Express on national television.
- In 1988, Pat Tanaka took on Greg Gagne for AWA International Television Title on national television.
- In 1988, Paul Diamond took on Greg Gagne for AWA International Television Title.
- A 1988 main event of Midnight Rockers vs. The Midnight Express with Paul E. Dangerously for AWA World Tag-Team Title on national television.
- In 1988, Wendy Richter took on Madusa Miceli for AWA Ladies Title on national television.
- In 1988, Kevin Kelly with Madusa Miceli took on Curt Hennig for AWA World Title on national television.
- In 1988, Wahoo McDaniel took on Curt Hennig with Madusa Miceli for AWA World Title on national television.
- A 1988 main event of Jerry Lawler vs. Curt Hennig for AWA World Title on national television, and the interview of Curt Hennig with Greg Gagne and Lee Marshall.
- The June 24, 1988, main event of Curt Hennig with Madusa Miceli vs. Jerry Lawler for AWA World Title on national television.
- In the weeks following December 13, 1988, pay-per-view, SuperClash III, ESPN aired bouts from the aforementioned pay-per-view broadcast and did not show any new AWA matches.
- On December 26, 1988, ESPN showed Sgt. Slaughter defeated Colonel DeBeers in a Boot Camp Match, and after the match The Iron Sheik attacked Sgt. Slaughter The Russian Brute and Ox Baker took on Sgt Slaughter.
- The AWA International Television Championship was a short-lived title in the American Wrestling Association from 1987 to 1989. Greg Gagne was the first champion. It was filled with a several months long tournament and was defended on their television broadcasts on ESPN.
- The December 26, 1988 ESPN showed Greg Gagne defeated Ron Garvin to win the AWA International Television Championship(5:52) from AWA SuperClash III pay-per-view.
- Ron Garvin was counted-out, the match was for the vacant championship and could be awarded by countout.
- A 1988 main event of AWA World Champion Jerry Lawler vs. WCCW World Champion Kerry Von Erich on national television.

1989

- After Jerry Lawler was stripped of the AWA World Title (for refusing to defend it following the SuperClash III pay-per-view due to a dispute with Verne Gagne over the payout from SuperClash III), a Battle Royal to decide the new AWA Champion was held in St Paul, Minnesota, on February 7, 1989. When the Battle Royal to crown a new champ (which was ultimately, Larry Zbyszko, who emerged victorious after eliminating Tom Zenk) aired on ESPN a week or so later, the announcers, particularly Lee Marshall, tried to bury Jerry Lawler.

1990

- In 1990, Harley Race took on Larry Zbyszko.
- In 1990, D.J. Peterson took on Larry Zbyszko.
- In 1990, ESPN broadcast the main event between The Trooper and Larry Zbyszko for AWA World Title.
- A 1990 main event of Nikita Koloff vs. Larry Zbyszko in 2 Out of 3 Falls match.

== See also ==
- AWA on television
