= All Star Wrestling (disambiguation) =

All Star Wrestling may refer to:

- All Star Wrestling, a British professional wrestling promotion operating since 1970, founded by Brian Dixon (1947-2023)
- All-Star Wrestling (role-playing game) a role-playing game published by Afterthought Images in 1991
- All-Star Wrestling, a wrestling TV series produced by the WWWF/WWF 1971–1986
- NWA All-Star Wrestling, a Canadian professional wrestling promotion, based in Vancouver, British Columbia
- AWA All-Star Wrestling, a professional wrestling TV series produced by the AWA
