= The Iron Sheik =

Iranian-American professional wrestler and actor (1942–2023)

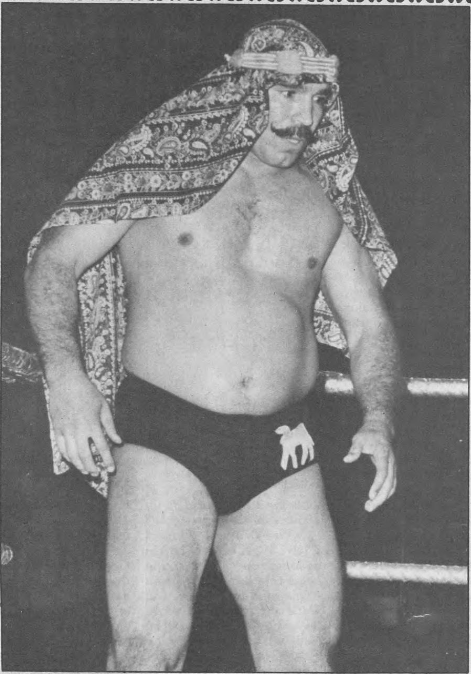
- The Iron Sheik in 1982

Personal information
- Born: Hossein Khosrow Ali Vaziri; March 15, 1942 Damghan, Imperial State of Iran
- Died: June 7, 2023 (aged 81) Fayetteville, Georgia, U.S.
- Spouse: Caryl Peterson (m. 1976)
- Children: 3

Professional wrestling career
- Ring names: Ali Vaziri; Col. Mustafa; Great Hossein Arab; Muhammad Farouk; The Iron Sheik
- Billed height: 6 ft 0 in (183 cm)
- Billed weight: 258 lb (117 kg)
- Billed from: Tehran, Iran
- Trained by: Verne Gagne; Billy Robinson
- Debut: 1972
- Retired: April 24, 2010
- Sports career
Medal record
Greco-Roman wrestling
AAU National Championships
Gold medal – first place	1971	180.5 lbs

Hossein Khosrow Ali Vaziri (Note: Persian: حسین خسرو علی وزیری, romanized: Hossein Xosrô 'Ali Vaziri) (March 15, 1942 – June 7, 2023), better known by his ring name the Iron Sheik, was an Iranian-American professional wrestler, amateur wrestler and actor. To date he is the only Iranian champion in WWE history, having won the WWF World Heavyweight Championship in 1983.

Vaziri's career peaked during the 1980s WWF wrestling boom, and his rivalry with Hulk Hogan turned Hogan into one of the greatest television heroes of the decade. He later formed a tag team with Nikolai Volkoff, which won the WWF Tag Team Championship at the inaugural WrestleMania event. In 2005, he was inducted into the WWE Hall of Fame.

A heel throughout the 1980s, Sheik later gained popularity on the Kidd Chris show, The Howard Stern Show, Opie and Anthony, and the Internet due to his shoot interviews, vulgar language, and apparent intense dislike for some of his fellow professional wrestlers, particularly Hogan and Brian Blair; however, the true nature of his relationship with Hogan has been a subject of debate.

== Early life and education ==
Vaziri was born in 1942, in Damghan, Imperial State of Iran, and grew up in a working-class family that had little money and no running water. Although his passport read March 15, he celebrated his birthday on September 9 due to his family alternating between the Gregorian calendar and the Solar Hijri calendar. In his youth, he idolized Iranian Olympic champion wrestler Gholamreza Takhti, and he subsequently made a name for himself as an amateur wrestler. He served in the Imperial Iranian Army, and worked as a personal bodyguard for Shah Mohammad Reza Pahlavi and his family for several years.

== Career ==
=== Amateur wrestling ===
Vaziri competed for a spot on Iran's Greco-Roman wrestling team for the 1968 Summer Olympics in Mexico City. After Takhti was mysteriously found dead in 1968, Vaziri began fearing for his safety and decided to emigrate to the United States to advance his career. In 1971, he was the AAU Greco-Roman wrestling champion at 180.5 pounds (81.9 kg). He later became assistant coach to the U.S. team for the 1972 Olympic Games in Munich.

=== Professional wrestling career ===
==== Early career (1972–1979) ====
In 1972, Vaziri was invited to become a professional wrestler by promoter Verne Gagne. Vaziri trained in the same class as Ric Flair at Gagne's wrestling camp under trainer Billy Robinson and then wrestled for Gagne's American Wrestling Association (AWA). He also worked as a trainer, teaching Ricky Steamboat, Greg Gagne and Jim Brunzell. Vaziri first wrestled as a face in preliminary matches before a promoter suggested that he adopt a heel gimmick similar to that of the notorious Sheik.

Vaziri obliged and adopted what came to be his signature look: He shaved his head bald, grew a traditional "buffo" style mustache and added wrestling boots with the toe curled up — a nod to his ethnic background, which, according to Vaziri, was an idea from Jimmy Snuka. He also introduced the Persian clubs, a sport in his native Iran, and challenged wrestlers to do as many swings as he. His Iranian gimmick received attention due to the events of the Iranian Revolution. Taking the name The Great Hossein Arab, he won his first title, the Canadian Tag Team Championship, with a partner the Texas Outlaw. He wrestled in Japan against the likes of Steve Day and Antonio Inoki in 1978.

==== World Wrestling Federation (1979–1980) ====
In 1979, Vaziri debuted in the World Wrestling Federation (WWF) as The Great Hossein Arab and won the first-ever Battle Royal in Madison Square Garden, New York City. This earned him a title shot at then-champion Bob Backlund, who pinned him later that night in a 30-minute battle following an Atomic Drop. He later feuded with Chief Jay Strongbow and Bruno Sammartino before leaving in 1980.

==== Jim Crockett Promotions (1980–1981) ====
In April 1980, Vaziri began wrestling for the Charlotte, North Carolina–based Jim Crockett Promotions. He wrestled a handful of matches as "Hussein Arab" before settling on "The Iron Sheik". His villainous persona played upon topical events such as the Iran hostage crisis. He quickly began feuding with Jim Brunzell over the NWA Mid-Atlantic Heavyweight Championship, defeating him for the championship in May 1980. He successfully defended the championship in bouts with opponents including Brunzell, Sweet Ebony Diamond, and Johnny Weaver before losing to Ricky Steamboat in a falls count anywhere match in November 1980. In February 1981, Vaziri began feuding with Blackjack Mulligan. The two men faced one another in a series of bouts including cage matches and Texas street fights lasting until May 1981. In July 1981, Vaziri unsuccessfully challenged Dusty Rhodes for the NWA World Heavyweight Championship. Vaziri left Jim Crockett Promotions in August 1981.

==== Mid-South Wrestling (1981–1982) ====
In September 1981, Vaziri joined the Louisiana-based Mid-South Wrestling promotion. He left the promotion in January 1982, making brief returns in October 1982.

==== Championship Wrestling from Florida (1982) ====
In January 1982, Vaziri joined Championship Wrestling from Florida. He left the promotion at the end of February 1982.

==== Kuwait (1982) ====
In 1982, Vaziri toured Kuwait under his old ring name Hussein Arab, where he was presented to largely Muslim audiences as a babyface.

==== Georgia Championship Wrestling (1982–1983) ====
In July 1982, Vaziri returned to Georgia Championship Wrestling for the first time since 1974. In May 1983, he won a tournament for the vacant NWA National Television Championship. His reign lasted until July 1983, when he lost to Ronnie Garvin. Vaziri left the promotion the following month.

==== Return to the WWF (1983–1987; 1988) ====
===== WWF World Heavyweight Champion (1983–1984) =====
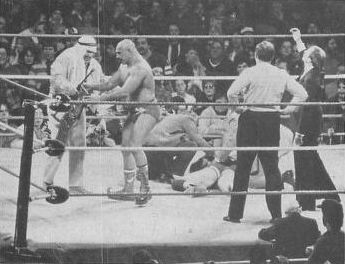
The Iron Sheik wins the WWF Championship from Bob Backlund, December 26, 1983

The Iron Sheik returned to the WWF in September 1983 and challenged Bob Backlund for WWF World Heavyweight Championship again. Backlund accepted, and on the December 24 episode of All- American Wrestling, also acceptued Sheik's weekly Persian club challenge. He was successful in his third attempt to swing the clubs, and the Sheik immediately attacked him from behind, injuring his neck in a work. In the December 26 title bout at Madison Square Garden, Backlund attempted to roll Sheik into a bridge pin, but this aggravated his work-weakened neck. Sheik capitalized by applying his Camel Clutch chin lock finisher. Backlund didn't submit, but his concerned manager Arnold Skaaland threw in the towel and forfeited the championship. This allowed the title to transition to Hulk Hogan without Hogan having to face a babyface champion. with the victory, he became the first Iranian born as well as the first (and only Shia) Muslim to hold the world championship in the WWF holding for 29 days (this drought would then be broken by Sami Zayn, another Muslim, 42 years later in 2026).

The Iron Sheik rematched Backlund indecisively at house shows and primarily defended the title against Chief Jay Strongbow, as well as Pat Patterson and Salvatore Bellomo. On national TV, he defeated only jobbers, but wrestled Tito Santana on a live PRISM broadcast from The Spectrum in Philadelphia on January 21, 1984. This match was later included in WWE's Legends of Wrestling 3 compilation.

Two days later, at Madison Square Garden, The Iron Sheik was scheduled to rematch Backlund, who was replaced by Hulk Hogan. Five minutes in, Sheik had Hogan locked in the Camel Clutch. Hogan powered to his feet with Sheik still on his back, rammed him backward into the turnbuckles, and hit his Atomic Legdrop for the pin and the championship. According to The Iron Sheik, Gagne had offered him $100,000 to break Hogan's leg during the match and return to the AWA with the WWF title, though Gagne's son Greg Gagne has disputed this claim.

He then bitterly feuded with Sgt. Slaughter, winning a few matches by disqualification, but losing the rest by pinfall or submission, including a "Boot Camp Rules" match.

===== Teaming with Nikolai Volkoff (1985–1986) =====
As a tag team partner with Nikolai Volkoff, and under the management of "Classy" Freddie Blassie, Iron Sheik won the WWF (World) Tag Team Championship from The U.S. Express (Barry Windham and Mike Rotundo) at the first WrestleMania at Madison Square Garden when he knocked out Windham from behind with Blassie's cane. Part of the pair's regular entrance consisted of waving the flags of Iran and the Soviet Union, then demanding that the crowd be quiet and "show respect" while Volkoff sang a throaty version of the Soviet national anthem, a demand that usually only attracted boos from the usually pro-American crowds.

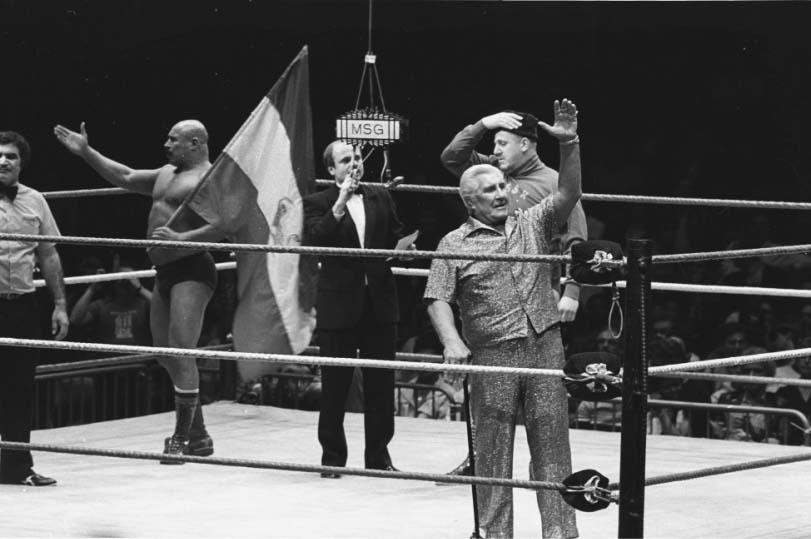
Sheik (second-to-last left) with Freddie Blassie and Nikolai Volkoff

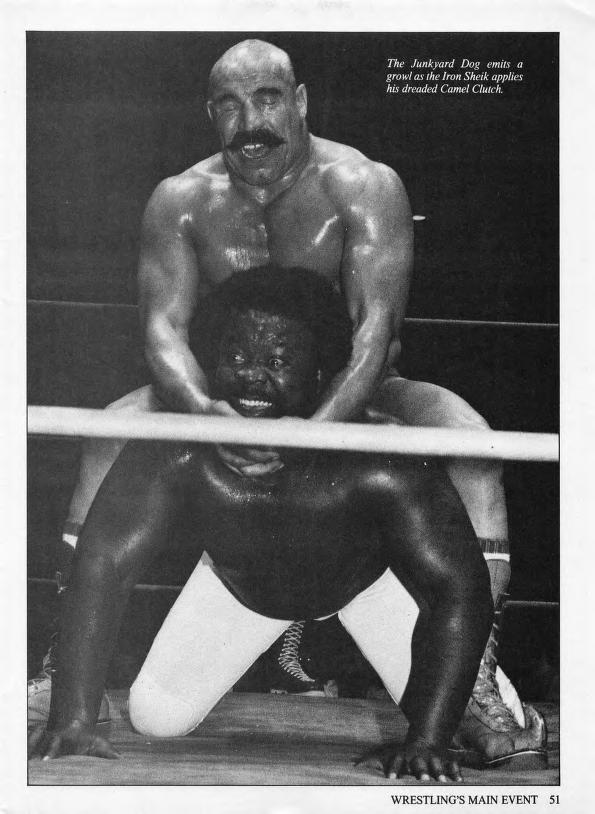
The Iron Sheik using his signature "Camel Clutch" submission hold on the Junkyard Dog.

Sheik then usually grabbed the mic and said, "Iran number 1, Russia number 1, USA (and Canada) (followed by a simulated spitting act)." It was all designed (very successfully) to get major heat from the crowd. He also got heat in his interviews with "Mean Gene" (although he would usually refer to him as "Gene Mean") by concluding with the demand "Hey cameraman, zoom it," as he flexed his muscles. During his stint in the WWF, he appeared in the music video for Cyndi Lauper's "Goonies 'R' Good Enough" as a part of the Rock 'n' Wrestling Connection. The Iron Sheik character was also seen regularly on the CBS animated series Hulk Hogan's Rock 'n' Wrestling, where he was voiced by American actor Aron Kincaid.

During 1986, Fred Blassie was beginning to wind down his career and as part of the angle, eventually sold his wrestlers contracts to new WWF manager Slick before retiring. This included the Sheik and Nikolai Volkoff who would now be managed by the "Doctor of Style". The Sheik was a participant in the 20-man invitational Battle royal in the Chicago portion of WrestleMania 2 which saw 14 WWF superstars in the ring with 6 National Football League (NFL) players. The Sheik was the 13th participant eliminated, at 5:22 by Bruno Sammartino.

===== Arrest and departure (1987) =====
In May 1987, "Hacksaw" Jim Duggan (an on-screen rival) and Vaziri were pulled over by New Jersey State Police on their way to a WWF event, suspecting Duggan of DUI. After a search of the vehicle and the persons, police discovered that Duggan was under the influence of marijuana while the Sheik was high on cocaine. Small amounts of cocaine were also found in the vehicle. Duggan received a conditional release while the Sheik was placed on probation for a year. The mini-scandal that erupted after two in-ring enemies were found drinking and doing drugs together led to the end of the angle, the Sheik's release, and Duggan's temporary departure from the WWF. At the time, the Sheik and Volkoff were embroiled in a feud with the patriotic Duggan. Before the Sheik's release from the company, he and Volkoff had defeated The Killer Bees ("Jumping" Jim Brunzell and B. Brian Blair) by disqualification at WrestleMania III at the Pontiac Silverdome when Duggan had hit the Sheik from behind with his 2x4 piece of wood while he had Brunzell in the Camel Clutch. After Sheik's arrest, he worked in house shows until leaving the WWF in October 1987.

===== Second return (1988) =====
On February 18, 1988, The Iron Sheik returned to the WWF and defeated S. D. Jones on a house show at the Meadowlands Arena in East Rutherford, New Jersey. Sheik continued to wrestle on house shows in February and March, beating Lanny Poffo and Ken Patera, and losing to Bam Bam Bigelow. He would not appear on television until July 18, when he defeated Scott Casey in a match that aired on Prime Time Wrestling.

Sheik continued to wrestle that summer, facing Casey in rematches as well as Richard Charland and The Red Rooster in house shows in the States and Canada. During his matches, comments were regularly made about the Iron Sheik's weight gain and diminished mobility. Iron Sheik had also cut promos to challenge then-World Champion "Macho Man" Randy Savage, but nothing came of it. Ultimately the return was short-lived. He left again in July of that year.

=== WCCW, AWA, and WWC (1987–1989) ===
In 1987, The Iron Sheik competed in Dallas' World Class Championship Wrestling (WCCW), where he feuded with Matt Borne over the WCWA Texas Heavyweight Championship. He stayed with that organization for only a few months, followed by brief stints with the AWA, where he attacked Sgt. Slaughter during a match, and Puerto Rico's World Wrestling Council (WWC). In addition to reigniting his feud with Slaughter and teaming with Colonel DeBeers, his main opponent during this time period was Tony Atlas, with whom he feuded in both WCCW and WWC.

==== NWA- World Championship Wrestling (1989–1991) ====
On February 25, 1989, the Iron Sheik made a surprise appearance at a World Championship Wrestling (WCW) TV taping in Atlanta, Georgia and immediately challenged Ricky Steamboat. On April 11, he challenged Sting at a television taping to a Persian clubs swinging competition. On the April 29 episode, the competition ensued which Sting admitted that Sheik had won, leading to a match between the two at Music City Showdown. On May 7 the two faced off, and Sheik was defeated by TV Champion Sting. In August 1989, he would form a brief alliance with Ron Simmons, appearing in his corner during a match with Jon Brewer. He would appear later that month in the corner of Simmons & The Cuban Assassin in a victory over Tommy Rich and Eddie Gilbert. On August 26, Simmons and Sheik were guests of Paul E. Dangerously's "Danger Zone", where he admitted that he was now training Simmons and was looking for a tag-team partner for him. The angle was eventually dropped and Simmons went on to team with Butch Reed as Doom, while Sheik finished his initial WCW tenure in house show matches against Norman in January 1990.

The Iron Sheik would return after a seven-month absence following Ole Anderson's elevation to head booker. A lapse in issuing a contract notice allowed Sheik's one-year deal to accidentally roll over and continue to work with the company. On July 7 at Great American Bash 1990 he faced Mike Rotunda in a losing effort in his first match back. He wrestled Brian Pillman, Tom Zenk, Terry Taylor, Brad Armstrong, and Big Van Vader on the house show circuit through the fall and winter of 1990. His final match was against the Junkyard Dog on January 26, 1991, in Columbia, South Carolina, after which he left the company.

==== Third return to the WWF (1991–1992) ====
He returned to the WWF again on March 11, 1991, making his re-debut on WWF Wrestling Challenge as Colonel Mustafa, and was aligned with former enemy Sgt. Slaughter. Along with Iraqi General Adnan, Slaughter and Mustafa were portrayed as Iraqi sympathizers during the Gulf War and feuded with Hulk Hogan and Ultimate Warrior. Following Slaughter's face turn after SummerSlam 1991, Mustafa remained aligned with Adnan. He dropped to a lower mid-card position, primarily losing matches against faces such as Slaughter, Tito Santana, British Bulldog, Ricky "The Dragon" Steamboat, "Texas Tornado" Kerry von Erich, "Hacksaw" Jim Duggan, and Tatanka. Mustafa would challenge for the WWF World Championship during the star-studded 1992 Royal Rumble match. Shortly thereafter, Adnan left the WWF and Mustafa would be without a manager for his final four months with the company. His final match was at a Superstars taping on May 19, 1992, where he defeated Reno Riggins, after which he left the promotion again.

==== Later career (1992–2010) ====
After WWF, the Sheik returned to Puerto Rico in October 1992. He also began working in the independent circuit as a babyface. On April 4, 1993, fought against his former tag partner Nikolai Volkoff to a double count-out for Maccabiah Mania in Livingston, New Jersey. He lost to the Junkyard Dog on May 12, 1995, for National Wrestling Conference in Las Vegas. He reunited with Nikolai Volkoff on October 10, 1999, at Heroes of Wrestling, losing to The Bushwhackers. From 2001 and onward he wrestled less.

Sheik's last match was on April 24, 2010, teaming with Jay Lethal defeating Dylan Kage with Paul Bearer in a handicap match for Millennium Wrestling Federation in Melrose, Massachusetts. It was a No Disqualification/Countout Match ending when Sheik made Kage submit to the camel clutch on the floor.

==== Sporadic appearances in the WWF/E (1996–2023) ====
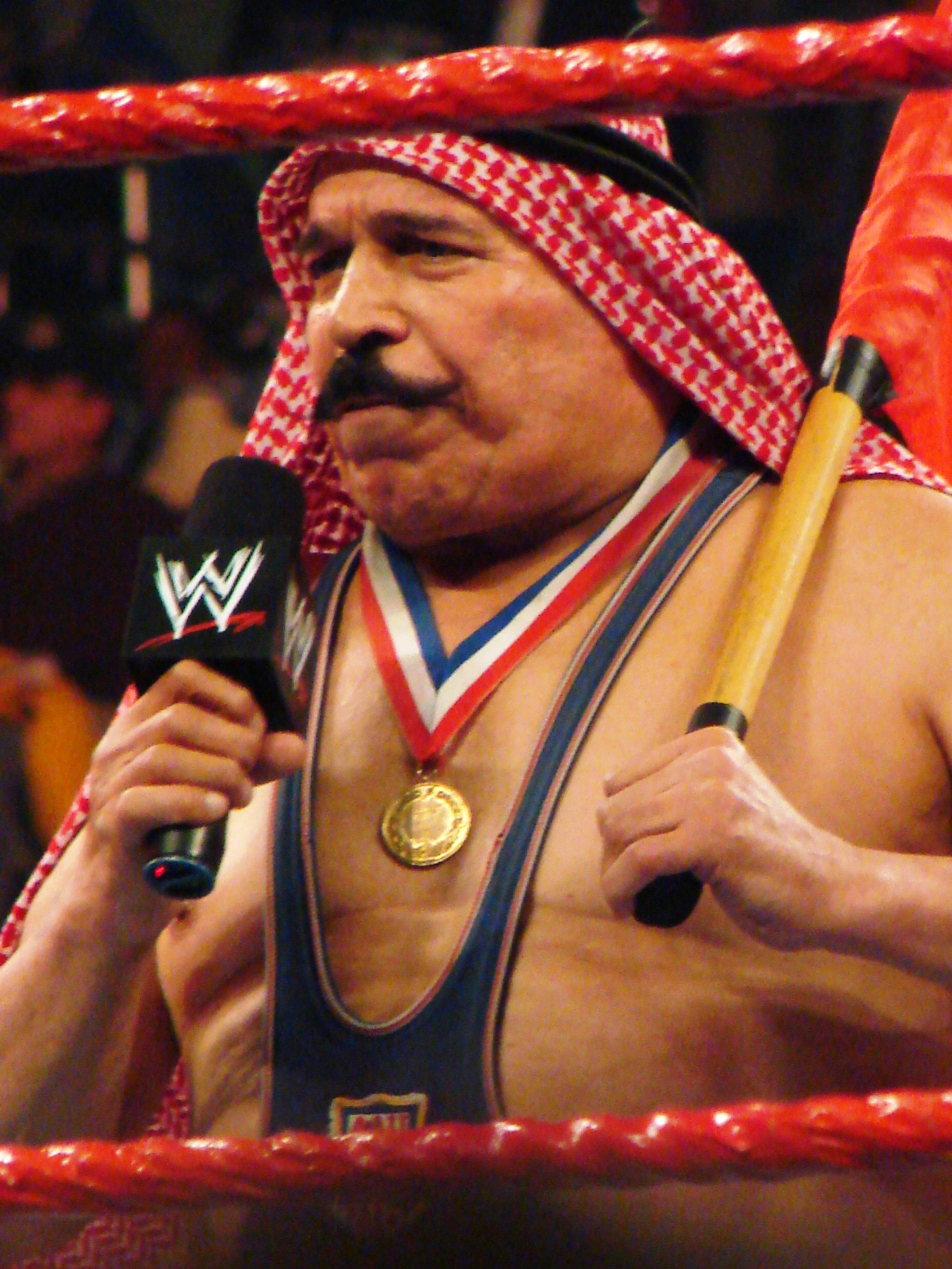
Sheik in 2008

In late 1996, the Sheik teamed with his old nemesis Bob Backlund to manage WWF wrestler The Sultan, who had a Middle Eastern gimmick. He would manage Sultan until December 1997. He also for a time during the summer of 1997 co-managed Tiger Ali Singh (with Ali's father, Tiger Jeet Singh). By year's end he had failed another drug test (he has referred to this as a "medicine test" in various interviews) and was released.

On April 1, 2001, at WrestleMania X-Seven, The Iron Sheik won the Gimmick Battle Royal, a match between other popular or outlandish wrestlers from the 1980s and 1990s. Rather than being booed for winning, the villainous Sheik (who had gained something of a cult following among wrestling fans) was cheered as a fan favorite. He eliminated Hillbilly Jim to win the Battle Royal and was immediately attacked by former rival/partner Sgt. Slaughter who put him in his Cobra clutch. It was later revealed that the Iron Sheik won this match because his age and health would not allow him to physically go over the top rope safely.

In 2005, before WrestleMania 21 in Los Angeles, The Iron Sheik was inducted into the WWE Hall of Fame by his long-time rival and former partner, Sgt. Slaughter. On the June 11, 2007, episode of Raw, he, along with Jimmy Snuka, appeared in a taped segment showing their appreciation of WWE owner Vince McMahon. On the June 18 episode of Raw, he approached McMahon's executive assistant Jonathan Coachman about having his own interview show on Raw. Coach replied saying, "I like the idea and I will really take some time to consider it." On the March 10th 2008 edition of Monday Night Raw, the Iron Sheik teamed with his former partner Nikolai Volkoff to face the U.S. Express in a dark match. This was a rematch of their encounter at the first WrestleMania.

== Films ==
The Iron Sheik made his film debut in The Tale of the 3 Mohammads in 2005. He then appeared alongside Daniel Baldwin and Corey Feldman in Operation Belvis Bash in 2011. Sheik also made an appearance on the Canadian show Kenny vs. Spenny on the "Who is a better pro wrestler?" episode where he attempted to sodomize a naked Spenny with a beer bottle. He also appeared in Maz Jobrani's 2009 stand-up comedy special Brown & Friendly. The Sheik made an appearance as himself in Robot Chicken, as well as The Eric André Show on Cartoon Network's Adult Swim.

In August 2013, Iron Sheik's managers Page and Jian Magen crowdsourced $40,441 to write, direct and produce a documentary, Iranian Legend: The Iron Sheik Story. Originally, the documentary was scheduled for a 2008 release under the title Iron Sheik: From A to Z. Sheik's documentary was released in 2014 under the title The Sheik.

== Video games ==
The Iron Sheik has appeared in video games: he made his video game debut in Legends of Wrestling (2001) and has since appeared in Legends of Wrestling II (2002), WWE SmackDown! Here Comes the Pain (2003), Showdown: Legends of Wrestling (2004), WWE Legends of WrestleMania (2009), in WWE 2K15 (2014), and WWE 2K16 (2015) under the Col. Mustafa gimmick. He returned in WWE 2K24 (2024) as downloadable content and WWE 2K25 (2025).

== Personal life ==
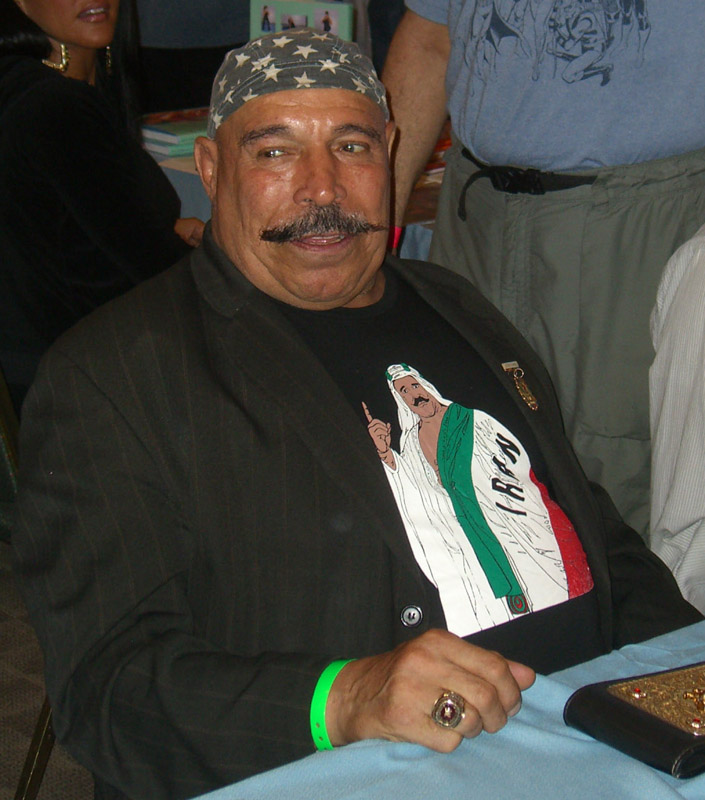
The Iron Sheik in 2009

Vaziri was a Shia Muslim. He married American Caryl Peterson on March 21, 1976; the best man at the wedding was "Mean" Gene Okerlund (whom the Sheik often referred to as "Gene Mean" in his broken English). His eldest daughter Marissa Jeanne Vaziri was murdered by her boyfriend Charles Warren Reynolds after an altercation in May 2003 at the age of 26. Reynolds was taken into custody and later convicted of the crime. Reynolds himself died in prison on May 31, 2016.

Despite promising to repair his family, Vaziri was unable to successfully quit drugs following Marissa's death. Vaziri was reported to have been extremely angered after Marissa's death to the point where he considered retaliation against her killer. In 2005, the family believed Vaziri was a danger to himself and others and forced him to enter rehabilitation; an employee allegedly snuck in cocaine for him. In 2007, Peterson walked out on Vaziri after several failed attempts to make him quit drugs. She returned two years later on the condition that Vaziri sever ties with a friend who helped him acquire them. In 2013, Vaziri said he had been off cocaine for four years. On November 6, Vaziri challenged the then-Mayor of Toronto, Rob Ford, to an arm wrestling match at his office during Ford's crack video scandal.

Starting in the late 2000s, Vaziri became known for his comedic Twitter account, which features violent, profanity-ridden Tweets denouncing various pop culture events. He did not write the Tweets himself; his managers, Jian and Page Magen, handled the account.

== Death ==
Vaziri died at home in Fayetteville, Georgia, on June 7, 2023. His cause of death was cardiac arrest with congestive heart failure and hypertension as contributing factors.

== Championships and accomplishments ==
=== Greco-Roman wrestling ===
- Amateur Athletic Union
  - 1971 Greco-Roman National Championships - 1st place, 180.5 lbs

=== Professional wrestling ===
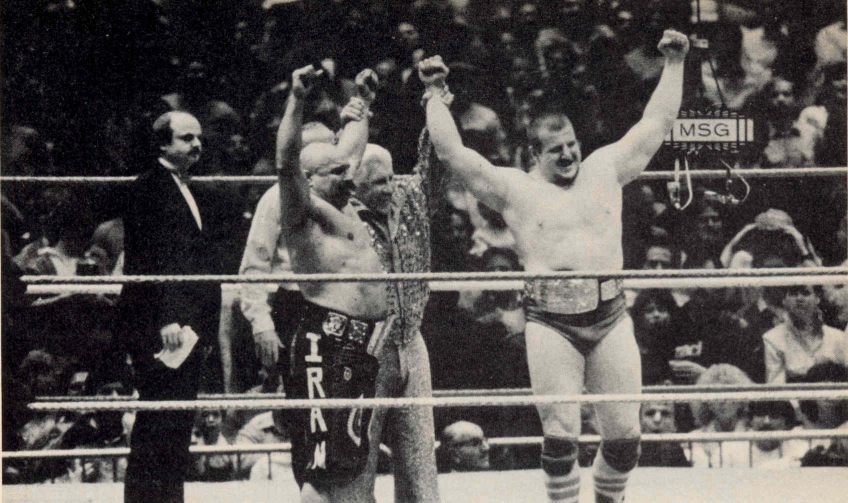
The Iron Sheik was a one-time WWF Tag Team Champion with Nikolai Volkoff

- All-California Championship Wrestling
  - ACCW Heavyweight Championship (2 times)
- Century Wrestling Alliance
  - CWA Heavyweight Championship (1 time)
- George Tragos/Lou Thesz Professional Wrestling Hall of Fame
  - Class of 2016
- Georgia Championship Wrestling
  - NWA National Television Championship (1 time)
- International Association of Wrestling
  - IAW Heavyweight Championship (1 time)
  - IAW Tag Team Championship (3 times) – with Brian Costello
- International Wrestling Association
  - IWA Intercontinental Championship (1 time)
- International Wrestling Association
  - IWA United States Heavyweight Championship (1 time)
- Maple Leaf Wrestling
  - NWA Canadian Heavyweight Championship (Toronto version) (2 times)
- Mid-Atlantic Championship Wrestling
  - NWA Mid-Atlantic Heavyweight Championship (1 time)
- NWA All-Star Wrestling
  - NWA Canadian Tag Team Championship (Vancouver version) (1 time) – with The Texas Outlaw
  - NWA Canadian Tag Team Championship Tournament (1978) - with The Texas Outlaw
- National Wrestling Alliance
  - NWA Hall of Fame (Class of 2008)
- NWA New Zealand
  - NWA New Zealand British Commonwealth Championship (1 time)
- NWA 2000
  - NWA 2000 American Heritage Championship (1 time)
- Pacific Northwest Wrestling
  - NWA Pacific Northwest Tag Team Championship (1 time) – with Bull Ramos
- Pro Wrestling Illustrated
  - PWI ranked him No. 134 of the 500 best singles wrestlers of the "PWI Years" in 2003
  - PWI ranked him No. 96 of the 100 best tag teams of the "PWI Years" with the Nikolai Volkoff in 2003
- World Wrestling Federation/World Wrestling Entertainment
  - WWF World Heavyweight Championship (1 time)
  - WWF Tag Team Championship (1 time) – with Nikolai Volkoff
  - WWE Hall of Fame (Class of 2005)
- Wrestling Observer Newsletter
  - Most Underrated Wrestler (1980)
