= Steve Olsonoski =

American professional wrestler

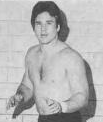
- Olsonoski, c. 1983

Personal information
- Born: Steven L. Olsonoski; July 3, 1953 (age 73) Edina, Minnesota, U.S.
- Education: University of Minnesota

Professional wrestling career
- Ring name(s): Steve O Steve Olsonoski; Super Ninja; Super Ninja Go
- Billed height: 6 ft 1 in (185 cm)
- Billed weight: 245 lb (111 kg)
- Trained by: Verne Gagne
- Debut: 1978
- Retired: 1991

Steven L. Olsonoski (born July 3, 1953), better known by the ring name Steve O, is an American retired professional wrestler from Minnesota. He was considered one of the top junior heavyweights during the 1980s.

== Professional wrestling career ==
Steve Olsonoski, purportedly from Edina, Minnesota, began his wrestling career in the late 1970s in the American Wrestling Association. He was often described as an up-and-coming star. He briefly teamed with Evan Johnson in the AWA, but his career progressed substantially as a solo wrestler. He wrestled off and on for the AWA through the 1980s.

Olsonoski, also known as Steve O., also wrestled for the National Wrestling Alliance in the early 1980s in the Georgia Championship Wrestling territory. While in Georgia he won the NWA Georgia Junior Heavyweight Championship, the NWA National Heavyweight Championship, the NWA National Tag Team Championship and twice won the NWA National Television Championship. He later returned to work for Verne Gagne in the American Wrestling Association.

== Championships and accomplishments ==
- American Wrestling Association
  - AWA Rookie of the Year Award (1978)
- Georgia Championship Wrestling
  - NWA Georgia Junior Heavyweight Championship (1 time)
  - NWA Georgia Television Championship (2 times)
  - NWA National Heavyweight Championship (1 time)
  - NWA National Tag Team Championship (1 time) – with Ted DiBiase
- Pro Wrestling Illustrated
  - PWI ranked him #249 of the top 500 singles wrestlers in the PWI 500 in 1991
- Pro Wrestling This Week
  - Wrestler of the Week (March 20–26, 1988) tied with Greg Gagne
