= Lee Marshall (announcer) =

Professional wrestling announcer and radio personality

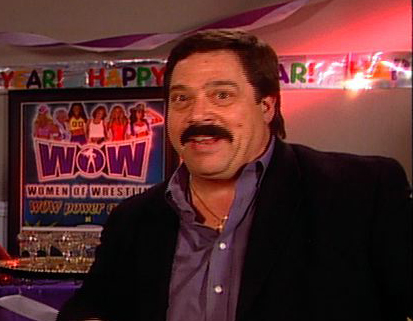

Personal information
- Born: Marshall Aaron Mayer; November 28, 1949 Los Angeles, California, U.S.
- Died: April 26, 2014 (aged 64) Santa Monica, California, U.S.

Professional wrestling career
- Ring name: Lee Marshall
- Billed height: 5 ft 10 in (1.78 m)
- Debut: 1968
- Retired: 2001

Lee Marshall (born Marshall Aaron Mayer; November 28, 1949 – April 26, 2014) was an American professional wrestling announcer and radio personality. In wrestling, Marshall worked as an announcer and commentator for the WWE, the American Wrestling Association (AWA), World Championship Wrestling (WCW) and Women of Wrestling (WOW!).

== Professional wrestling announcing ==
=== World Wrestling Federation ===
Marshall was briefly with the World Wrestling Federation as a ring announcer. He was the ring announcer for the Los Angeles portion of WrestleMania 2.

=== American Wrestling Association ===
In 1986, Marshall joined the broadcast team when the AWA Championship Wrestling show was on ESPN where he remained until 1990.

=== World Championship Wrestling ===
In January 1996, he signed a three year contract with World Championship Wrestling (WCW), where he was known as "Stagger Lee", likely a reference to the Lloyd Price song of the same name.

Marshall made his WCW pay-per-view debut at Uncensored (1996). Marshall was also one of the announcers at the 1996 World War 3 pay-per-view at the Norfolk Scope in Norfolk, Virginia, covering the third ring with Larry Zbyszko. During the early stages of the three-ring, 60-man Battle Royal, the Four Horsemen and the Dungeon of Doom battled outside the ring and in the ensuing fight, Marshall was knocked down and repeatedly kicked legitimately to the head and chest by the Faces of Fear (Meng and The Barbarian) while on the floor. After the fight moved back toward the locker room, Marshall managed to get himself up and finish calling the match.

In November 1996, Marshall began a weekly 60 second segment on WCW Monday Nitro called "On The Road" when he placed a phone call to Tony Schiavone via 1-800-COLLECT from somewhere in America to plug the following week's Nitro.

In January 1998, TBS added WCW Thunder to their schedule with Marshall as main co-host alongside Tony Schiavone and (real life close friend) Bobby Heenan. Later that year, he would join Mark Madden calling WCW Pay Per View events on the WCW website. Marshall's last WCW appearance was at Starrcade (1998) interviewing The Giant. Marshall left WCW shortly after the PPV due to a contract dispute.

=== Women of Wrestling ===
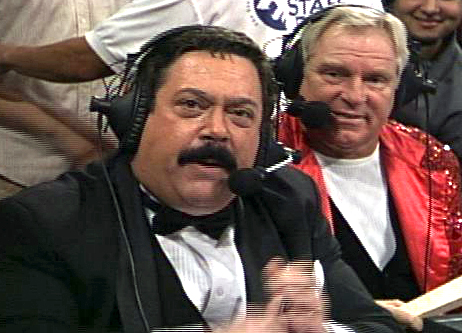
Lee Marshall with Bobby "the Brain" Heenan at WOW Unleashed

He was also involved in the Great Western Forum-based Women of Wrestling promotion and served as its play-by-play announcer. He was partnered with company owner David McLane, who served as the color commentator on the syndicated TV show, and worked with Bobby "The Brain" Heenan, the color commentator on the WOW pay-per-view on February 4, 2001.

== Radio and music ==
Marshall was also a longtime radio announcer, working at such stations as KABC and KGFJ (now KYPA) and KBLA and KHJ in Los Angeles, KRIZ in Phoenix and CKLW in Windsor, Ontario, Canada (Detroit). In the early 2000s hosted an oldies AM show at 1450 the Boomer, Ventura CA. At CKLW, he was one of the anchors for the station's "20/20 News" updates, and at KDAY, he was "King News", bringing attention to the issue of gang violence. Marshall made an appearance in the rap video for We're All in the Same Gang as King News telling the gangbangers "they just don't get it."

== Other works ==
Marshall also served as narrator of Larryboy: The Cartoon Adventures, a direct-to-video spin-off of the Christian animated series VeggieTales.

He provided the voice of Frosted Flakes mascot Tony the Tiger in commercials from 1999 to 2014, succeeding Thurl Ravenscroft.

== Death ==
Marshall died in Santa Monica on April 26, 2014, of esophageal cancer. He was 64 years old.

== Awards and accomplishments ==
- Wrestling Observer Newsletter awards
  - Worst Television Announcer (1998)
