= AWA International Television Championship =

Professional wrestling championship

- The championship belt

Details
- Promotion: American Wrestling Association
- Date established: December 27, 1987
- Date retired: October 16, 1989
Statistics
- First champion: Greg Gagne
- Most reigns: Greg Gagne (2 regins)
- Longest reign: Greg Gagne (307 days)
- Shortest reign: Ron Garvin (87 days)

The AWA International Television Championship was a short-lived title in the American Wrestling Association from 1987 to 1989. It was filled with a several months long tournament and was defended on their television broadcast on ESPN.

As explained by Larry Nelson on the AWA Championship Wrestling show on ESPN, the first two wrestlers in the tournament to reach 50 points (with 5 points being awarded or deducted for a pinfall or submission victory or loss, and 2.5 points being awarded or deducted for a countout or disqualification victory or loss) faced off in the finals to determine the first champion.

== Title history ==
Key
| No. | Overall reign number |
| Reign | Reign number for the specific champion |
| Days | Number of days held |

| No. | Champion | Championship change | | | Reign statistics | | Notes | Ref. |
| No. | Champion | Date | Event | Location | Reign | Days | Notes | Ref. |
|---|---|---|---|---|---|---|---|---|
| 1 | Greg Gagne | December 27, 1987 | Championship Wrestling | Las Vegas, Nevada | 1 | 265 | Defeated Adrian Adonis via disqualification in the finals of the tournament | |
| 2 | Ron Garvin | September 17, 1988 | Championship Wrestling | Nashville, Tennessee | 1 | 87 | Title later held up by AWA President Stanley Blackburn after deciding Garvin won under controversial circumstances. | |
| 3 | Greg Gagne | December 13, 1988 | SuperClash III | Chicago, Illinois | 2 | 307 | Match for the vacant title. Gagne won by countout. Garvin had signed a contract with the World Wrestling Federation and would not lose the match clean | |
| — | Vacated | October 16, 1989 | — | — | — | — | Gagne retired from in-ring competition. | |
Championship history is unrecorded from November 1989 to January 1991.
| — | Deactivated | August 1991 | — | — | — | — | | |

.

== Combined Reigns ==
| Rank | Wrestler | No. of reigns | Combined days |
|---|---|---|---|
| 1. | Greg Gagne | 2 | 572 |
| 2. | Ron Garvin | 1 | 87 |
