= NWA National Television Championship =

Professional wrestling championship

- A version of the championship belt

Details
- Promotion: Georgia Championship Wrestling
- Date established: 1969
- Date retired: 1972, 1981 and 1985

Other names
- NWA Georgia Television Championship; NWA World Television Championship
Statistics
- First champion: Joe Scarpa
- Most reigns: Ron Garvin (5 reigns)
- Longest reign: Ray Gunkel (291 days)
- Shortest reign: Jake Roberts (Less than 5 minutes)
- Oldest champion: Bob Roop (41 years+)
- Youngest champion: Bobby Eaton (22 years, 161 days)

The NWA National Television Championship was a secondary singles championship in the National Wrestling Alliance's Georgia Championship Wrestling territory. It started as the NWA Georgia Television Championship before becoming the National Television Championship. From 1983 to 1985, it was renamed the NWA World Television Championship, but when Jim Crockett Promotions purchased the assets of GCW from the World Wrestling Federation, the Georgia version of the NWA World Television Championship was reduced back to the NWA National Television Championship, in favor of the Crockett version. On April 21, 1985, the championship was abandoned.

== Title history ==
Name	Duration
NWA Georgia Television Championship	1969–1979
NWA National Television Championship	1979–1984
NWA World Television Championship	1984–1985
NWA National Television Championship	1985

Key
No.	Overall reign number
Reign	Reign number for the specific champion
Days	Number of days held

No.	Champion	Championship change			Reign statistics		Notes	Ref.
No.	Champion	Date	Event	Location	Reign	Days	Notes	Ref.
1	Joe Scarpa	November 22, 1969	Live event	Atlanta, Georgia	1	42	Scarpa defeated Assassin #2 in an 8-man tournament final to become the first champion.	
2	Nick Bockwinkel	January 3, 1970	Live event	Atlanta, Georgia	1	63		
3	El Mongol	March 7, 1970	Live event	Atlanta, Georgia	1	3		
—	Vacated	March 10, 1970	—	—	—	—	Title held-up after the tape shows Mongol using an illegal karate blow.	
4	Nick Bockwinkel	March 20, 1970	Live event	Atlanta, Georgia	2	22	Bockwinkel defeated El Mongol in a rematch.	
5	Assassin #2	April 11, 1970	Live event	Atlanta, Georgia	1	42		
—	Vacated	May 23, 1970	—	—	—	—	The Assassins were suspended and Assassin #2 was stripped of the title. Nick Bockwinkel and Joe Scarpa had a match for the vacant title on May 29, 1970 in Atlanta, Georgia that ended in a no-contest.	
6	Nick Bockwinkel	June 15, 1970	Live event	Atlanta, Georgia	3	61	Defeated Joe Scarpa.	
7	Bobby Shane	August 15, 1970	Live event	Atlanta, Georgia	1	126		
8	Luke Graham	December 19, 1970	Live event	Atlanta, Georgia	1	91		
9	Klondike Bill	March 20, 1971	Live event	Atlanta, Georgia	1	203		
10	Big Bad John	October 9, 1971	Live event	Atlanta, Georgia	1	6		
11	Ray Gunkel	October 15, 1971	Live event	Atlanta, Georgia	1	291		
—	Deactivated	August 1, 1972	—	—	—	—	Title deactivated when Gunkel died of heart attack after match with Ox Baker in Savannah, Georgia.	
12	Tony Atlas	February 1, 1977	Live event	N/A	1	10	Defeated Ole Anderson in a tournament final.	
13	Abdullah the Butcher	February 11, 1977	Live event	Atlanta, Georgia	1	49		
14	Thunderbolt Patterson	April 1, 1977	Live event	N/A	1	85		
15	French Angel	May 7, 1977	Live event	N/A	1	20		
16	Thunderbolt Patterson	May 27, 1977	Live event	N/A	2	66		
—	Vacated	August 1, 1977	—	—	—	—	Title vacated when Thunderbolt Patterson lost in a loser leaves town match.	
17	Bob Armstrong	December 9, 1977	Live event	Atlanta, Georgia	1	63	Defeated Jacques Goulet in a tournament final.	
18	Ole Anderson	February 10, 1978	Live event	Atlanta, Georgia	1	81		
19	Thunderbolt Patterson	May 2, 1978	Live event	Macon, Georgia	3	287		
20	Ole Anderson	February 13, 1979	Live event	N/A	2	71		
21	Bob Armstrong	April 25, 1979	Live event	Columbus, Georgia	2	19		
22	Blackjack Lanza	May 14, 1979	Live event	Augusta, Georgia	1	81		
23	Ray Candy	August 3, 1979	Live event	Atlanta, Georgia	1	88		
24	Ernie Ladd	October 30, 1979	Live event	N/A	1	3		
25	Stan Hansen	November 2, 1979	Live event	Atlanta, Georgia	1	1		
26	Killer Karl Kox	November 3, 1979	Live event	Atlanta, Georgia	1	28		
27	Ray Candy	November 30, 1979	Live event	Atlanta, Georgia	2	7		
28	Austin Idol	December 7, 1979	Live event	Atlanta, Georgia	1	29	Title renamed NWA National Television Championship.	
29	Steve Travis	January 5, 1980	Live event	N/A	1	7		
30	Austin Idol	January 12, 1980	Live event	Atlanta, Georgia	2	15		
31	Kevin Sullivan	January 27, 1980	Live event	Atlanta, Georgia	1	25		
32	Austin Idol	February 21, 1980	Live event	Atlanta, Georgia	3	2		
33	Tommy Rich	February 23, 1980	Live event	Atlanta, Georgia	1	71		
—	Vacated	May 4, 1980	—	—	—	—	Rich vacated the title in order to pursue Harley Race's NWA World Heavyweight Championship.	
34	Terry Taylor	August 22, 1980	Live event	Atlanta, Georgia	1	51	Defeated Ken Patera and Bob Armstrong in a tournament round-robin final.	
35	Terry Funk	October 12, 1980	Live event	Columbus, Ohio	1	21		
36	Steve Keirn	November 2, 1980	Live event	N/A	1	27		
37	Kevin Sullivan	November 29, 1980	Live event	Atlanta, Georgia	2	48		
38	Steve O	January 16, 1981	Live event	Atlanta, Georgia	1	6		
39	Bobby Eaton	January 22, 1981	Live event	Atlanta, Georgia	1	1		
40	Steve O	January 23, 1981	Live event	Atlanta, Georgia	2	29		
41	Kevin Sullivan	February 21, 1981	Live event	Atlanta, Georgia	3	8		
42	Steve Keirn	March 1, 1981	Live event	Atlanta, Georgia	2	31		
—	Deactivated	April 1, 1981	—	—	—	—		
43	The Iron Sheik	May 28, 1983	Live event	Atlanta, Georgia	1	50	Defeated Ron Garvin by disqualification in a tournament final to win the reactivated title.	
44	Ron Garvin	July 17, 1983	Live event	Atlanta, Georgia	1	112		
45	Jake Roberts	November 6, 1983	Live event	Atlanta, Georgia	1	153	Title recognized as the NWA World Television Championship after March 1984.	
46	Ron Garvin	April 7, 1984	Live event	Baltimore, Maryland	2	71		
47	Jake Roberts	June 17, 1984	Live event	Atlanta, Georgia	2	0	This was shown on tape delay on Georgia Championship Wrestling as part of the "NWA Superstars" series.	
—	Vacated	June 17, 1984	—	Atlanta, Georgia	—	—	Immediately vacated because Roberts used a foreign object.	
48	Ron Garvin	July 1, 1984	Live event	Atlanta, Georgia	3	63	After the WWF purchased GCW on Black Saturday, NWA member successor promotion, Championship Wrestling from Georgia, continued to recognize Garvin as champion.	
49	Bob Roop	September 2, 1984	Live event	N/A	1	117		
50	Ron Garvin	December 28, 1984	Live event	Saginaw, Michigan	4	190		
51	Bob Roop	January 7, 1985	Live event	N/A	2	97	In March 1985, the title reverted to the National TV title when Jim Crockett Promotions, which already had its own TV title, purchased Championship Wrestling from Georgia	
51	Ron Garvin	April 14, 1985	Live event	Atlanta, Georgia	5	7		
—	Deactivated	April 21, 1985	—	—	—	—	Title deactivated	

== List of combined reigns ==
Rank	Wrestler	No. of reigns	Combined days
1	Ron Garvin	5	443
2	Thunderbolt Patterson	3	438
3	Ray Gunkel	1	291
4	Bob Roop	2	214
5	Klondike Bill	1	203
6	Jake Roberts	2	153
7	Ole Anderson	2	152
8	Nick Bockwinkel	3	146
9	Bobby Shane	1	126
10	Ray Candy	2	95
11	Luke Graham	1	91
12	Bob Armstrong	2	82
13	Blackjack Lanza	1	81
13	Kevin Sullivan	3	81
15	Tommy Rich	1	71
16	Steve Keirn	2	58
17	Terry Taylor	1	51
18	The Iron Sheik	1	50
19	Abdullah the Butcher	1	49
20	Joe Scarpa	1	42
20	Assassin #2	1	42
21	Austin Idol	3	36
22	Steve O	2	35
23	Killer Karl Kox	1	28
24	Terry Funk	1	21
25	French Angel	1	20
26	Tony Atlas	1	10
27	Steve Travis	1	7
28	Big Bad John	1	6
29	El Mongol	1	3
29	Ernie Ladd	1	3
31	Stan Hansen	1	1
31	Bobby Eaton	1	1
