= 1989 in professional wrestling =

1989 in professional wrestling describes the year's events in the world of professional wrestling.

== List of notable promotions ==
These promotions held notable events in 1989.

Promotion Name	Abbreviation	Notes
All Japan Women's Pro-Wrestling	AJW	
Empresa Mexicana de Lucha Libre	EMLL	
Frontier Martial-Arts Wrestling	FMW	Founded in July.
New Japan Pro-Wrestling	NJPW	
Universal Wrestling Association	UWA	
World Championship Wrestling	WCW	
World Wrestling Council	WWC	
World Wrestling Federation	WWF	

== Calendar of notable shows ==
Date	Promotion(s)	Event	Location	Main Event
January 15	WWF	Royal Rumble	Houston, Texas	Big John Studd won the Royal Rumble match by last eliminating Ted DiBiase
January 29	UWA	UWA 14th Anniversary Show	Naucalpan, Mexico	El Canek (c) defeated Konnan in a singles match for the UWA World Heavyweight Championship
February 15	WCW	Clash of the Champions V: St. Valentine's Massacre	Cleveland, Ohio	The Road Warriors (Animal and Hawk) and Genichiro Tenryu (c) vs. The Varsity Club (Mike Rotunda, Kevin Sullivan and Steve Williams) ended in a double disqualification in a six-man tag team match for the NWA World Six-Man Tag Team Championship
February 16	WWF	Saturday Night's Main Event	Hershey, Pennsylvania	Hulk Hogan defeated Bad News Brown in a singles match
February 20	WCW	Chi-Town Rumble	Chicago, Illinois	Ricky Steamboat defeated Ric Flair (c) in a singles match for the NWA World Heavyweight Championship
April 2	WCW	Clash of the Champions VI: Ragin' Cajun	New Orleans, Louisiana	Ricky Steamboat (c) defeated Ric Flair 2-1 in a Two-out-of-three falls match for the NWA World Heavyweight Championship
April 2	WWF	WrestleMania V	Atlantic City, New Jersey	Hulk Hogan defeated Randy Savage (c) in a singles match for the WWF World Heavyweight Championship
April 24	NJPW	Battle Satellite in Tokyo Dome	Tokyo, Japan	Shota Chochishvili defeated Antonio Inoki (c) by KO in a singles match for the NJPW Martial Arts Championship
April 25	WWF	Saturday Night's Main Event	Des Moines, Iowa	Hulk Hogan (c) vs. Big Boss Man in a singles match for the WWF World Heavyweight Championship
April 28	EMLL	33. Aniversario de Arena México	Mexico City, Mexico	Ángel Azteca defeated Emilio Charles Jr. © in a best two-out-of-three falls match for the NWA World Middleweight Championship
May 6	AJW	Wrestlemarinepiad '89	Yokohama, Japan	Chigusa Nagayo retired in a series of matches where she fought and teamed with Lioness Asuka. Lioness Asuka also defeated Madusa in a WWWA World Title match.
May 7	WCW	WrestleWar	Nashville, Tennessee	Ric Flair defeated Ricky Steamboat (c) in a singles match for the NWA World Heavyweight Championship
June 14	WCW	Clash of the Champions VII: Guts and Glory	Fort Bragg, North Carolina	Ricky Steamboat defeated Terry Funk by disqualification in a Singles match
July 18	WWF	Saturday Night's Main Event	Worcester, Massachusetts	Hulk Hogan (c) vs. The Honky Tonk Man in a singles match for the WWF World Heavyweight Championship
July 23	WCW	The Great American Bash	Baltimore, Maryland	Ric Flair (c) defeated Terry Funk in a singles match for the NWA World Heavyweight Championship
August 28	WWF	SummerSlam	East Rutherford, New Jersey	Brutus Beefcake and Hulk Hogan defeated Randy Savage and Zeus in a Tag team match
September 10	WWC	WWC 16th Aniversario	Bayamón, Puerto Rico	Carlos Colón defeated Steve Strong (c) in a Barbed wire match for the WWC Universal Championship
September 12	WCW	Clash of the Champions VIII: Fall Brawl '89	Columbia, South Carolina	Sting and Ric Flair defeated Dick Slater and The Great Muta by disqualification in a tag team match
September 21	WWF	Saturday Night's Main Event	Cincinnati, Ohio	Hulk Hogan (c) vs. Ted DiBiase in a singles match for the WWF World Heavyweight Championship
September 22	EMLL	EMLL 56th Anniversary Show	Mexico City, Mexico	Atlantis (mask) and El Satánico (hair) defeated Los Infernales (Tierra Viento y Fuego (mask) and MS-1 (hair)) in a best two-out-of-three falls Lucha de Apuestas mask and hair vs. mask and hair match
October 6	FMW	The Grudge in Nagoya	Nagoya, Aichi, Japan	Masashi Aoyagi defeated Atsushi Onita by TKO in a Singles match
October 10	FMW	The Grudge in Tokyo	Tokyo, Japan	Atsushi Onita defeated Masashi Aoyagi by KO in a Singles match
October 10	WWF	First WWF UK Event	London, England	Hulk Hogan (c) defeated Randy Savage in a singles match for the WWF World Heavyweight Championship
October 14	WWF	King of the Ring	Providence, Rhode Island	Dusty Rhodes defeated Big Boss Man in a singles match
October 28	WCW	Halloween Havoc	Philadelphia, Pennsylvania	Ric Flair and Sting defeated The Great Muta and Terry Funk in a Thunderdome match with Bruno Sammartino as special guest referee
October 31	WWF	Saturday Night's Main Event	Topeka, Kansas	The Genius defeated Hulk Hogan (c) by countout in a singles match for the WWF World Heavyweight Championship
November 15	WCW	Clash of the Champions IX: New York Knockout	Troy, New York	Ric Flair defeated Terry Funk in a I Quit match
November 23	WWF	Survivor Series	Rosemont, Illinois	The Ultimate Warriors (The Ultimate Warrior, Jim Neidhart, Shawn Michaels and Marty Jannetty) defeated The Heenan Family (Bobby Heenan, André the Giant, Haku and Arn Anderson) in a 4-on-4 Survivor Series match
December 7	NJPW	G1 Climax	Tokyo, Japan	Shinya Hashimoto defeated Riki Choshu in the finals
December 10	FMW	Battle Creation	Tokyo, Japan	Atsushi Onita and Tarzan Goto defeated Jerry Blayman and Mitsuhiro Matsunaga by KO in a Barbed Wire Death match
December 12	WWF	No Holds Barred: The Match/The Movie	Nashville, Tennessee	Brutus Beefcake and Hulk Hogan defeated Randy Savage and Zeus in a Steel Cage match
December 13	WCW	Starrcade	Atlanta, Georgia	Sting defeated Ric Flair in a tournament match
(c) – denotes defending champion(s)

== Notable events ==
- January the alliance between The American Wrestling Association and The Continental Wrestling Association ended due to AWA Owner Verne Gagne refusing to pay then-World Champion Jerry Lawler for participating on the company's first-ever Pay-Per-View AWA SuperClash III.
- February 7 - In a live event at St. Paul, Minnesota, Larry Zbyszko won the battle royal to capture the vacant AWA World Heavyweight Championship.
- The World Wrestling Association professional wrestling promotion based out of Indianapolis, Indiana, closed.
- August 4 WCCW becomes the USWA when Eric Embry pinned Phil Hickerson in a steel cage match in Dallas, Texas.

== Tournaments and accomplishments ==
=== AJW ===
Accomplishment	Winner	Date won	Notes
Japan Grand Prix 1989	Mitsuko Nishiwaki	August 24	
Rookie of the Year Decision Tournament	Kaoru Ito		
Tag League The Best 1989	Madusa Miceli and Mitsuko Nishiwaki	October 8	

=== AJPW ===
Accomplishment	Winner	Date won	Notes
Asunaro Cup 1989	Toshiaki Kawada	July 25	

=== NJPW ===
Accomplishment	Winner	Date won	Notes
World Cup League	Riki Choshu	December 7	

=== WCW ===
Accomplishment	Winner	Date won	Notes
NWA World Tag Team Championship Tournament	The Fabulous Freebirds (Jimmy Garvin and Michael Hayes)	June 14	
Iron Man tournament	Sting	December 13	
Iron Team tournament	The Road Warriors (Hawk and Animal)	December 13	

=== WWF ===
Accomplishment	Winner	Date won	Notes
Royal Rumble	Big John Studd	January 15	
King of the Ring	Tito Santana	October 14	

== Awards and honors ==
=== Pro Wrestling Illustrated ===
Category	Winner
PWI Wrestler of the Year	Ric Flair
PWI Tag Team of the Year	The Brain Busters (Arn Anderson and Tully Blanchard)
PWI Match of the Year	Ricky Steamboat vs. Ric Flair (WrestleWar)
PWI Feud of the Year	Ric Flair vs. Terry Funk
PWI Most Popular Wrestler of the Year	Hulk Hogan
PWI Most Hated Wrestler of the Year	Randy Savage
PWI Most Improved Wrestler of the Year	Scott Steiner
PWI Most Inspirational Wrestler of the Year	Eric Embry
PWI Rookie of the Year	The Destruction Crew (Mike Enos and Wayne Bloom)
PWI Lifetime Achievement	Gordon Solie
PWI Editor's Award	Bobby Heenan

=== Wrestling Observer Newsletter ===
Category	Winner
Wrestler of the Year	Ric Flair
Most Outstanding	Ric Flair
Feud of the Year	Ric Flair vs. Terry Funk
Tag Team of the Year	The Rockers (Shawn Michaels and Marty Jannetty)
Most Improved	Lex Luger
Best on Interviews	Terry Funk

== Title changes ==
=== WWF ===
WWF World Heavyweight Championship
Incoming champion – Randy Savage
Date	Winner	Event/Show	Note(s)
April 2	Hulk Hogan	WrestleMania V	

WWF Intercontinental Championship
Incoming champion – The Ultimate Warrior
Date	Winner	Event/Show	Note(s)
April 2	Rick Rude	WrestleMania V	
August 28	The Ultimate Warrior	SummerSlam	

WWF World Martial Arts Heavyweight Championship
Incoming champion – Antonio Inoki
Date	Winner	Event/Show	Note(s)
April 24	Shota Chochishvili	House show	
May 25	Antonio Inoki	House show	
December 31	Deactivated	N/A	

WWF Women's Tag Team Championship
Incoming champions – The Glamour Girls (Leilani Kai and Judy Martin)
Date	Winner	Event/Show	Note(s)
February 14	Retired	N/A	

WWF Women's Championship
Incoming champion – Rockin' Robin
Date	Winner	Event/Show	Note(s)
No title changes

WWF Tag Team Championship
Incoming champions – Demolition (Ax and Smash)
Date	Winner	Event/Show	Note(s)
July 18	The Brain Busters (Arn Anderson and Tully Blanchard)	Saturday Night's Main Event XXII	
October 2	Demolition (Ax and Smash)	Superstars of Wrestling	Aired on Tape Delay on November 4.
December 13	The Colossal Connection (Andre the Giant and Haku)	Superstars of Wrestling	Aired on Tape Delay on December 30.

Million Dollar Championship
(Title created)
Unsanctioned championship
Date	Winner	Event/Show	Note(s)
February 15	Ted DiBiase	Superstars of Wrestling	DiBiase had the title created for himself and unveiled the belt during a segment called "The Brother Love Show". This episode aired on tape delay on March 4.

== Births ==
- January 11 – Natalia Markova
- January 25 – Stu Grayson
- February 8 – Syuri
- February 25 – Natsumi Sumikawa
- March 1 – Tenille Dashwood
- March 23 – Riara
- March 31 – Debbie Keitel
- April 9 – Bianca Belair
- April 10 - Juice Robinson
- April 11 – Ariya Daivari
- April 16 – Mia Yim
- April 21 – Nikki Cross
- April 22 –Andre Chase
- May 14 – Rob Gronkowski
- May 19 – Tom Phillips
- June 14 - Peter Avalon
- June 15 – Bayley
- June 23 – Billie Kay
- July 5 – Adam Cole
- July 7 – Josh Woods (wrestler)
- July 12 – Sam Stackhouse
- July 25 – Jake Doyle
- July 28 – Nick Jackson
- August 2 – Yuna Mizumori
- August 8 – Gianni Valletta
- August 16 – Cedric Alexander
- August 25 – Gene Munny
- August 28 – Christina Von Eerie
- September 2 – Kengo
- September 20 – Ethan Page
- October 3 – T. K. O'Ryan
- October 11 – Riddick Moss
- October 24 – Heidi Howitzer
- November 3 – Andrade "Cien" Almas
- December 4 – Hiromu Takahashi

== Debuts ==
=== Debut date ===
- January 10 - Utako Hozumi (JWP)
- January 14 - Leo Kitamura (JWP)
- February 22 - Salman Hashimikov, Victor Zangiev and Vladimir Berkovich
- March 1 – Booker T
- March 19 - Super Delfin
- April 20 - Maniaco
- April 24 - Wahka Eveloev (NJPW)
- April 30 – Rey Mysterio
- May 12 - Timur Zalasov (NJPW)
- May 25 - Habieli Victachev (NJPW)
- August 2 - Evgeny Artyukhin Sr. (NJPW)
- September 19 – Yoshihiro Tajiri
- October 6 - Shark Tsuchiya, Miwa Sato and Mitsuteru Tokuda
- October 8 – Kaoru Ito, Bat Yoshinaga (All Japan Women's) and Tomoko Watanabe
- October 29 – Tommy Dreamer
- November 26 - Andrei Sulsaev (NJPW)
- December 1 - Yasha Kurenai (JWP), Carol Midori (JWP) and Sambo Asako (FMW)
- December 6 - Hisae Kuboki (All Japan Women's), Mayumi Yamamoto (All Japan Women's) and Michiko Nagashima (All Japan Women's)
- December 7 - Kazue Saito (All Japan Women's) and Sakie Hasegawa (All Japan Women's)

=== Uncertain debut date ===
- Sandman
- X-Pac
- Scotty 2 Hotty
- Billy Gunn
- Ken Shamrock
- Tony Halme
- Jerry Flynn
- Jimmy Jannetty
- J. W. Storm
- Bobby Walker

== Retirements ==
- Al Tomko (July 9, 1954 – 1989)
- Alfonso Dantés (1960–1989)
- Blue Demon (March 31, 1948 – August 27, 1989)
- Jonathan Boyd (1966–1989)
- Nelson Royal (1955–1989)
- Rayo de Jalisco (February 1950 – 1989)
- Steve Rickard (1943–1989)
- Victor Rivera (1964–1989)
- Big John Studd (1972–1989)

== Deaths ==
- January 6 - Mario Galento, 73
- January 7 - Aslam Pahalwan, 61
- February 18 - Mildred Burke, 73
- March 7 - Paul Boesch, 76
- March 14 – Happy Humphrey, 62
- April 17 – Villano II, 39
- May 9 - Tiger Joe Marsh, 77
- July 25 - Sweet Georgia Brown (wrestler), 50
- September 7 - Eduardo Perez (wrestler), 60 or 61
- December 7 – Haystacks Calhoun, 55
- December 28 – Earl Patrick Freeman, 57

== See also ==
- List of WCW pay-per-view events
- List of WWF pay-per-view events
- List of FMW supercards and pay-per-view events
