= All-Star Wrestling (role-playing game) =

1991 role-playing game

All-Star Wrestling is a role-playing game published by Afterthought Images in 1991.

== Contents ==
All-Star Wrestling is a role-playing game where players take on the roles of professional wrestlers. The rules, written and illustrated by Paul Schulze, are published as a 96-page perfect-bound softcover book

== Gameplay ==
=== Character creation ===
Players create their wrestling character by apportioning points to Power, Agility, Quickness, Technical Ability and Endurance. These then determine secondary attributes, including Damage Bonus, Recovery, Attack Value and Defense Value. All of these values determine how many actions can be performed in one round. The player then generates their wrestler's background, which may generate more creation points that can then supplement basic attributes. Players can also generate more creation points by applying drawbacks to their wrestler such as "Old Injury". The player then purchases wrestling skills such as various strikes and holds, submission holds, finishing strikes, illegal maneuvers, breaking holds, and the ability to distract the ref.

=== Combat ===
Players determine which wrestler moves first. The acting wrestler chooses an action (strike, hold, escape from a hold, moment of rest and recovery, etc.) If attacking, the wrestler adds his attack value to his skill level for the desired maneuver, then subtracts the opponent's defense value. The active wrestler must then roll equal to or lower than the resulting value on a twenty-sided die. If successful, damage is determined by a number of six-sided dice. Damage is first subtractred from a wrestler's Body rating, then Body points and Endurance. Once Body Points or Endurance reach zero, the wrestler becomes easier to pin or force into submission.

== Reception ==
In the August 1994 edition of Dragon (Issue #208), Lester Smith found little to fault, saying "the writing is clean, with an open, engaging style, and so are the illustrations." Smith's only complaint was that "the game focuses so much on the wrestlers themselves that it pretty much ignores the reaction of the crowds." He concluded by giving the game an above average rating of 5 out of 6, saying that All-Star Wrestling was "an admirable product."
