= Ron Garvin =

Canadian professional wrestler (born 1945)

Personal information
- Born: Roger Barnes; March 30, 1945 (age 81) Montreal, Quebec, Canada
- Family: Jimmy Garvin (stepson); Patricia Williams (stepdaughter in law)

Professional wrestling career
- Ring name(s): Ronnie Garvin; Mr. Eau Gallie; Mr. Knoxville; Roger Barnes; Ron Garvin
- Billed height: 5 ft 10 in (178 cm)
- Billed weight: 242 lb (110 kg)
- Billed from: Montreal, Quebec, Canada; Charlotte, North Carolina; Knoxville, Tennessee
- Trained by: Pat Curry
- Debut: 1962
- Retired: September 20, 2014

Roger Barnes (born March 30, 1945) is a Canadian former professional wrestler, better known by his ring name, "Hands Of Stone" Ronnie Garvin. He is best known for his appearances with Mid-Atlantic Championship Wrestling and the World Wrestling Federation in the late-1980s and early-1990s. Championships held by Garvin over his career include the NWA World Heavyweight Championship. He headlined the Starrcade '87: Chi-Town Heat pay-per-view event.

== Professional wrestling career ==
=== Early career (1962–1976) ===
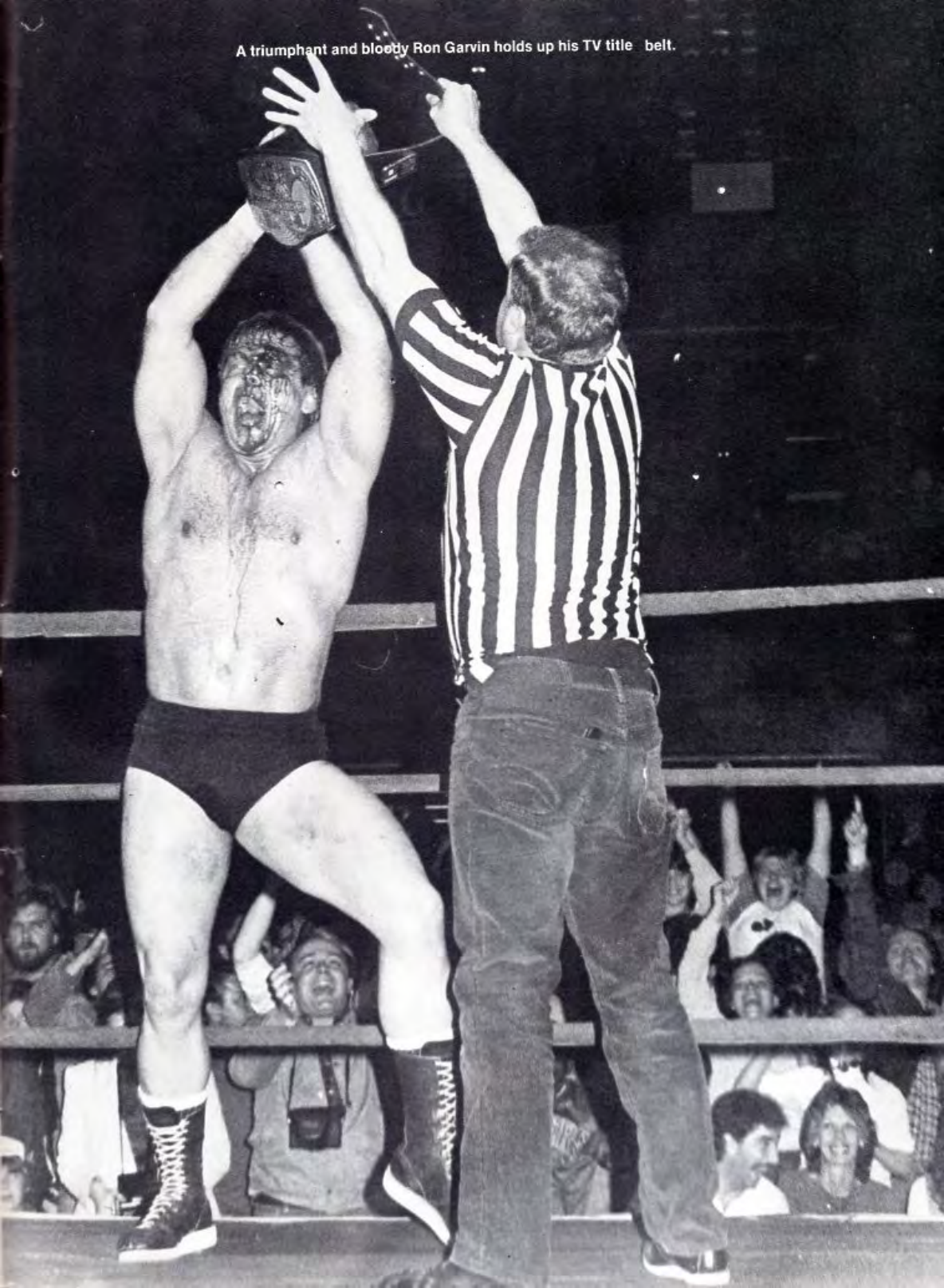
Garvin (left) wins the NWA National Television Championship, circa 1984

Barnes started wrestling in 1962 under his birthname. In the mid-1960s he adopted the ring name "Ron Garvin" and formed a tag team with Terry Garvin, who was billed as being his brother. The pair competed together in the late 1960s and early 1970s, taking home multiple regional tag team titles. They were managed by their other "brother," Jimmy Garvin (actually Ron's stepson in real life).

=== Jim Crockett Promotions (1968-1976) ===
Garvin had competed for the National Wrestling Alliance's Jim Crockett Promotions periodically beginning in 1968, but as he mostly focused on other NWA territories, he was usually considered a jobber to the stars, whether alone or teaming with Terry Garvin. He and Terry split up in 1974. Garvin stayed with Crockett until 1976.

=== Southern Territories (1976-1984) ===
He made a name for himself as a singles wrestler in the Georgia, Alabama, Kentucky, and Tennessee territories in the late 1970s after splitting with Terry and Jimmy. Garvin wrestled in the Ron Fuller (Welch)-owned Knoxville promotion (Southeastern Championship Wrestling) where he (in)famously threw the championship belt off of the Gay Street Bridge. He later wrestled in Angelo Poffo's International Championship Wrestling promotion where he was best known for his heated rivalries with Randy Savage and Pez Whatley. One of Garvin's best-known ICW moments was where he knocked Ox Baker's dentures out of his mouth, after which Garvin stomped on the dentures. Garvin is well known in the Southeast, he had feuds with such wrestlers as Andre the Giant, Bob Orton Jr., and Tony Charles. For a time, Garvin used a gimmick known as Mr. Knoxville and formed a tag team with Charles, but soon Garvin turned on him and started teaming with Orton, turning heel in the process. Garvin held the NWA Georgia Television Title (also known as the National TV Title) 5 times, including a feud with then Legion of Doom member, Jake "The Snake" Roberts. At one point during the storyline, Jake Roberts held the TV title and refused to give Garvin a rematch. Garvin had to mortgage his house to come up with $10,000 to pay Roberts for a rematch. Garvin would go on to win the rematch and once again become the NWA National TV champion.

=== Return to Jim Crockett Promotions (1984–1988) ===
==== Initial years (1984–1987) ====
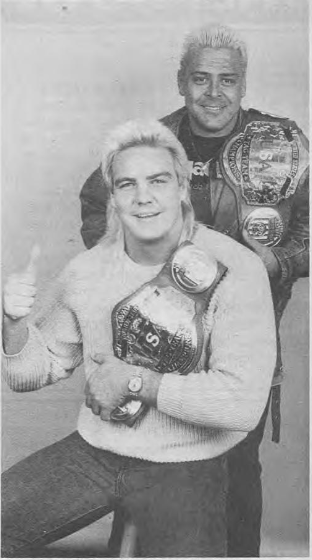
Barry Windham (foreground) and Garvin as NWA United States Tag Team Champions, c. 1987

Garvin returned to JCP in 1984 and began the road that would achieve his greatest success. He became known as "The Man With the Hands of Stone." He feuded with Tully Blanchard and Black Bart. He also formed a tag team with Barry Windham and the duo won the NWA United States Tag Team Championship from Ivan Koloff and Kruscher Kruschev before losing the belts to Koloff and Dick Murdoch.

Garvin feuded with Jim Cornette's "Midnight Express" team of "Lover Boy" Dennis Condrey and "Beautiful" Bobby Eaton. At Starrcade '85: The Gathering Garvin teamed with Jimmy Valiant to face the Midnight Express in an Atlanta Street Fight; for this match Garvin wrestled in drag as "Miss Atlanta Lively." Garvin also had a singles feud with Cornette's bodyguard, Big Bubba Rogers to whom he lost a Street Fight at Starrcade '86: The Skywalkers. In 1987 Windham and Garvin feuded with Cornette's Midnight Express (still composed of Condrey and Eaton) over the United States Tag Team Championship. During one televised match, after Cornette threw fire in Garvin's face, Garvin's "brother" "Gorgeous" Jimmy Garvin came to his rescue, turning both himself and his valet Precious babyface in the process. The Garvin "brothers" teamed for a while against the Midnight Express. In May 1987, Windham and Garvin reached the finals of a tournament for the vacant United States tag team titles but lost to the new Midnight Express line-up of Eaton and "Sweet" Stan Lane. The two teams continued to feud over the titles, with the Garvins getting pinfall wins in non-title matches, or DQ wins when the titles were on the line. Ron Garvin also got his revenge on Jim Cornette by defeating him in a series of cage matches where the Rock & Roll Express would run in and keep the Midnight Express from interfering.

==== NWA World Heavyweight Champion (1987) ====
The Garvins next entered in a feud with NWA World Champion Ric Flair in 1987 over Flair's lust for Precious. On one occasion when Flair defeated Jimmy to win a date with Precious, he was instead ambushed by Ron Garvin once again in drag as Miss Atlanta Lively. During this feud, Flair once stated that Garvin had "hands of stone," This eventually led to Garvin having the moniker, "The Man With the Hands of Stone." The two had intense matches that sold-out arenas. The two traded victories, with Garvin winning non-title matches and getting DQ wins on title matches, and Flair getting victories when the title was on the line. The feud with Flair took a new twist on September 25, 1987, when Garvin was able to defeat Flair for the title. With the NWA holding Starrcade '87: Chi-Town Heat the same day that the rival World Wrestling Federation (WWF) was holding its first Survivor Series, Crockett chose to face the strong WWF competition by having Flair win the title. Flair therefore had to lose the title first and whoever beat him would only be a placeholder champion. Most wrestlers declined the offer, but Garvin, assuming that at 42 it may be his last chance to hold the major NWA title, agreed to fill the role. Indeed, Garvin held the title for two months before losing it back to Flair at Starrcade.

==== Final feuds and departure (1987–1988) ====
After the title loss, the Garvins entered into a feud with Kevin Sullivan and his Varsity Club. At the Great American Bash, the brothers teamed with The Road Warriors and Steve Williams and defeated Sullivan, Mike Rotunda, Al Perez, Russian Assassin and Ivan Koloff in a Tower of Doom match. Later that night however, Ron Garvin shocked fans when he became a heel by knocking Dusty Rhodes out with a punch to keep him from winning Windham's U.S. Title, thus reuniting the former US tag team champions as heels. Garvin was managed by Gary Hart but left after only a few months as a heel before the August 12th card in Norfolk, VA after a disagreement, putting an end to 20 years in a Jim Crockett Promotions about to become World Championship Wrestling.

=== American Wrestling Association and World Wrestling Council (1988) ===
Still as a heel, Garvin wrestled in the American Wrestling Association in late 1988 and feuded with Greg Gagne over the AWA International Television Championship. He also feuded with Carlos Colon over the WWC Universal Heavyweight Championship during trips to Puerto Rico.

=== World Wrestling Federation (1988–1990) ===
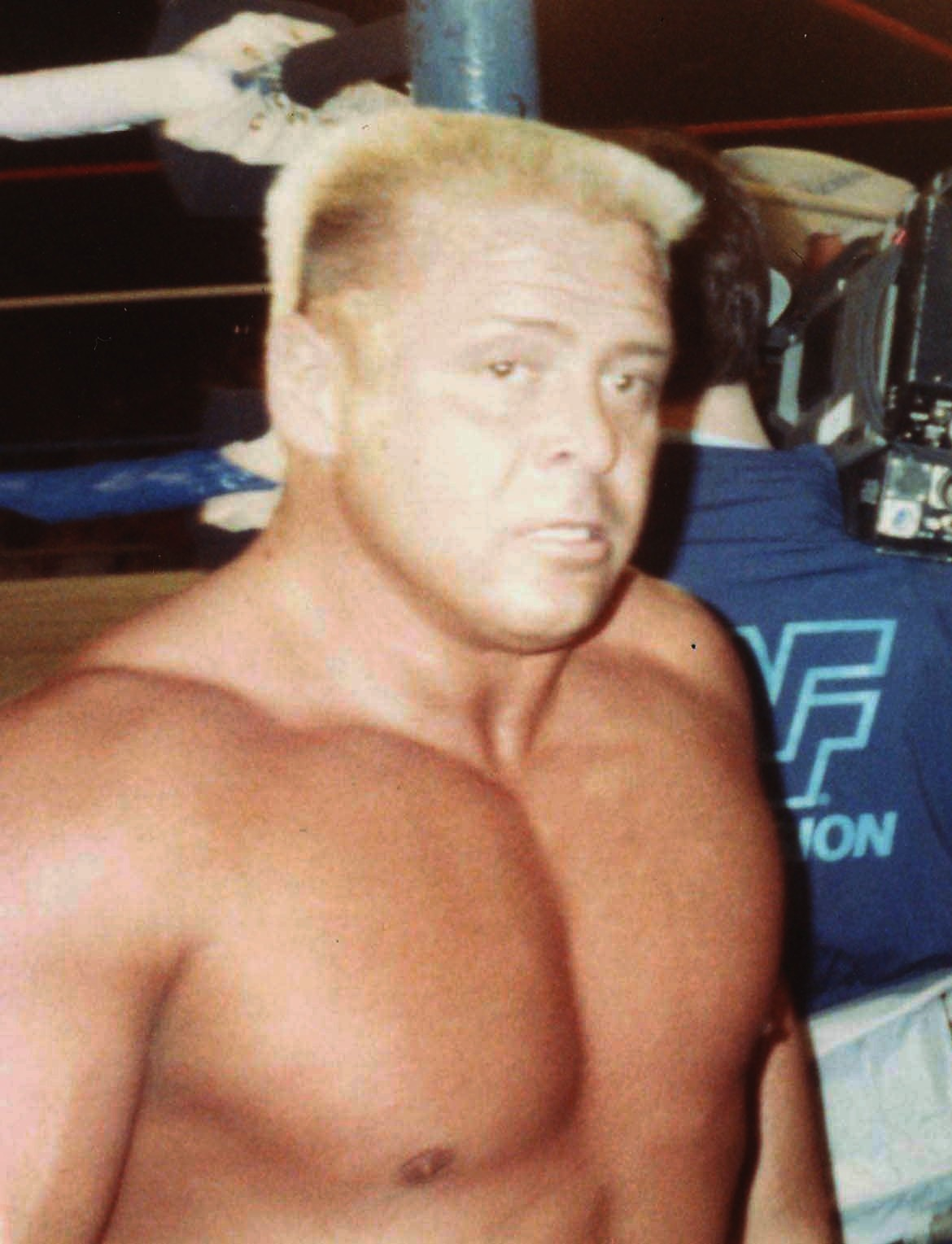
Garvin in March 1989

Garvin next went to the World Wrestling Federation, where he began to wrestle in November 1988 as a fan favorite under the name "Rugged" Ronnie Garvin. At the Royal Rumble (1989) he competed in the Royal Rumble match, but got eliminated by André the Giant. He lost to Dino Bravo at WrestleMania V on April 2, 1989.

Garvin went on to feud with Greg Valentine. After a televised match between the two on April 22, 1989, which Garvin won, Valentine was interviewed immediately afterwards and challenged Garvin a retirement match the next week, which Valentine won. Garvin soon started portraying a referee, but during matches, he would fight with the wrestlers who would not listen to his orders, such as Dino Bravo and the Brooklyn Brawler. Despite warnings by WWF president Jack Tunney, Garvin punched Valentine during his match against Jimmy Snuka, which led to him being banned from refereeing. At SummerSlam, Garvin served as special ring announcer for Valentine's match against Hercules. Garvin stated during his foe's introduction that Valentine was underweighing himself by 30 pounds, and had two left feet. When Valentine pinned Hercules with his feet on the ropes, Garvin announced Hercules as the winner. Valentine knocked him out of the ring, but Garvin came back and punched him out. Irate at Garvin's antics, Valentine asked that Garvin be reinstated so that he could get his hands on him. For the next four months the two had house show matches all over the country, trading victories in the process. The two then battled at the 1990 Royal Rumble in a Submission match, which Garvin won to end the feud. At Survivor Series, Garvin competed in a 4-on-4 Survivor Series elimination match where he was a member of The 4x4s (Jim Duggan, Bret Hart, Garvin and Hercules) but they were defeated by The King's Court (Randy Savage, Canadian Earthquake, Dino Bravo and Greg Valentine).

After his feud ended with Valentine, Garvin was about to feud with Rick Martel. They cut promos on each other, but a televised match between the two never happened. They did, however, wrestle at house shows, with Martel winning most of the encounters. Garvin left the WWF in November 1990.

=== Later career (1991–2014) ===
Garvin returned to WCW in a house show in Knoxville, Tennessee, on March 8, 1991 when he lost to Rick Steiner, but was not given a contract. He thus returned to the World Wrestling Council in 1991 and reignited his feud with Carlos Colon over the WWC Universal Heavyweight Championship, winning it for a second time on February 2, 1992. He moved onto Jim Cornette's Smoky Mountain Wrestling promotion where he feuded with Paul Orndorff and Kevin Sullivan, among others. From 1995 to 2001, Garvin ran his own promotion in Knoxville, Tennessee, called Tennessee Mountain Wrestling. In 2001 he sold it to former SMW associate Tony Anthony and Bob Orton Jr., who ran it for two more years He continued making appearances for independent promotions on a semi-retired basis well into the 2000s. In 2011, he competed in a legends battle royal at a Juggalo Championship Wrestling event. On September 20, 2014, he wrestled a tag team match for Bruiser Wrestling Federation in his last recorded match at 69.

== Post-wrestling career ==
Garvin owns several used car dealerships in Gaston County, North Carolina. Garvin is an accomplished pilot (his stepson, Jimmy Garvin, became an airline pilot in his retirement from wrestling). He holds commercial and instrument ratings for single engine and multi engine aircraft.

== Personal life ==
Barnes' stepson, Jimmy Garvin, is also a former professional wrestler.

== Championships and accomplishments ==
Gavin as NWA National Heavyweight Champion, c. 1984

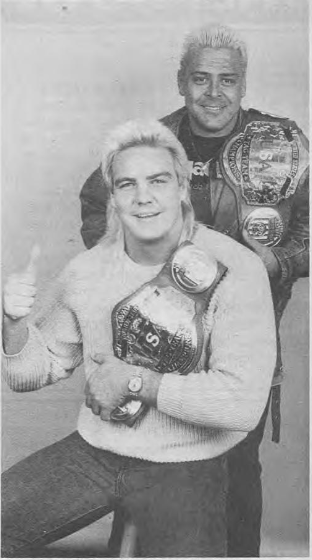
Garvin and Barry Windham as NWA United States Tag Team Champions, c. 1987

- All-American Wrestling
  - AAW Heavyweight Championship (1 time)
- American Wrestling Association
  - AWA International Television Championship (1 time)
- Cauliflower Alley Club
  - Men's Wrestling Award (2008)
- Championship Wrestling from Florida
  - NWA Florida Tag Team Championship (1 time) – with Ole Anderson
  - NWA World Tag Team Championship (Florida version) (1 time) – with Terry Garvin
- International Championship Wrestling
  - ICW Southeastern Heavyweight Championship (2 times)
- Lutte International 2000
  - Johnny Rougeau Tag Team Championships (1 time) - with Jimmy Garvin
- Mid-Atlantic Championship Wrestling/Jim Crockett Promotions
  - NWA Mid-Atlantic Heavyweight Championship (1 time)
  - NWA United States Tag Team Championship (1 time) – with Barry Windham
  - NWA World Heavyweight Championship (1 time)
- Mid-South Sports/Georgia Championship Wrestling
  - NWA Georgia Tag Team Championship (2 times) – with Terry Garvin
  - NWA Macon Tag Team Championship (2 times) – with Terry Garvin (1), and Roger Kirby (1)
  - NWA National Heavyweight Championship (1 time)
  - NWA National Tag Team Championship (1 time) – with Jerry Oates
  - NWA National Television Championship (2 times)
  - NWA World Television Championship (Georgia version) (2 times)^{1}
- National Championship Wrestling
  - NCW Heavyweight Championship (1 time)
- National Wrestling Alliance
  - NWA World Heavyweight Championship (1 time)
- NWA Mid-America
  - NWA Mid-America Tag Team Championship (2 times) – with Terry Garvin
  - NWA Southern Junior Heavyweight Championship (1 time)
  - NWA Southern Tag Team Championship (Mid-America version) (1 time) – with Terry Garvin
- Northland Wrestling Enterprises
  - North American Junior Heavyweight Championship (Ontario version) (3 times)
  - North Ontario Tag Team Championship (2 times) - with Terry Garvin
- Pro Wrestling Federation
  - PWF Tag Team Championship (1 time) - with Italian Stallion
- Pro Wrestling Illustrated
  - Ranked No. 126 of the top 500 singles wrestlers in the PWI 500 in 1991
  - Ranked No. 142 of the top 500 singles wrestlers of the "PWI Years" in 2003
- Professional Wrestling Hall of Fame
  - Class of 2019
- Southeastern Championship Wrestling
  - NWA Southeastern Heavyweight Championship (Northern Division) (5 times)
  - NWA Southeastern Tag Team Championship (3 times) – with Tony Charles (1), and Bob Orton, Jr. (2)
  - NWA Tennessee Tag Team Championship (1 time) – with Terry Garvin
- Tennessee Mountain Wrestling
  - TMW Heavyweight Championship (1 time)
  - TMW Tag Team Championship (1 time) – with Tim Horner
- World Wrestling Council
  - WWC Universal Heavyweight Championship (2 times)

^{1}This title was originally named the NWA Georgia Television Championship and was eventually renamed the NWA World Television Championship. However, in March 1985, World recognition is dropped by the NWA and the title reverts to the National Television Championship.
