= AWA All-Star Wrestling =

- Starring: American Wrestling Association roster
- Country of origin: United States

Production
- Running time: 120 minutes

Original release
- Network: First-run syndication
- Release: 1960 – 1990

AWA All-Star Wrestling was a syndicated television series featuring wrestling matches as promoted by the American Wrestling Association (AWA). All-Star Wrestling footage (and AWA footage as a whole) is now owned by WWE.

== Overview ==
=== In relation to upcoming house shows ===
During the 1960s and early 1970s, the All-Star Wrestling television series was essentially a one-hour paid advertisement for the AWA's house shows. This meant that third party advertisers were almost nonexistent. In the early 1970s, as wrestling became more popular, national companies such as McDonald's and local companies such as car dealerships bought commercial spots on the shows.

Every two weeks, many of the wrestlers who were currently working the house shows for the AWA would assemble at a studio in Minneapolis, Minnesota. They would wrestle jobbers (wrestlers who constantly lose) in squash matches (one-sided victories) that seldom lasted for more than a few minutes each. Then, they would do as many different interviews as were needed. These interviews were tailored to whatever opponents they were scheduled to meet at the various house shows during the coming two weeks. In the meantime, editors would splice together the appropriate interview and wrestling footage for each individual house show and send the canned one-hour production to the TV stations in the respective market.

The AWA bought 60 or 90 minute time slots each week at the TV stations. The shows usually aired on Saturday or Sunday mornings (when TV time was relatively inexpensive). The shows throughout the 1960s-on through the early 1970s were shot in black and white.

=== Alternate opens and titles ===
The March 9, 1986, edition of AWA All Star Wrestling featured a new show opening, with a change from the "old time" grainy open which was similar to the WWWF/WWF All-Star opening. The new one featured the AWA logo flying through space.

The show was referred to as Pro Wrestling USA: All-Star Wrestling beginning with the January 26, 1985, edition and was called so until early 1986. The program was called Verne Gagne's All Star Wrestling to avoid confusion with the former Pro Wrestling USA label afterwards.

=== Standard format ===
The early shows followed a standard format: As previously mentioned, there would be a squash match featuring a wrestler appearing at the upcoming house show. The wrestler would next appear in an interview and promise to vanquish his opponent. Afterwards, the aforementioned opponent would appear in his own squash match, followed by his interview. After each interview, the viewer would be reminded of the date, time, and location of the house show. This would continue throughout the 60–90 minutes and include as many of the wrestlers appearing at the upcoming house show as possible, as well as other well-known wrestlers in the AWA who might be appearing in the near future.

For wrestlers who could not appear in Minneapolis on the date the taping was produced, footage of one of their old squash matches would be spliced in, and the wrestlers might do the interview for the house show weeks before the actual house show. Taping the interviews well in advance wasn't much of a problem, as most matches (and most results) were already known weeks or months in advance.

=== Production locations ===
Throughout the 1960s and 1970s, the AWA's television production was headquartered at Minneapolis independent station WTCN-TV, then owned by Metromedia. By 1979, production was transferred to Minneapolis station KMSP-TV.

=== Ratings ===
According to AWA wrestler (and son of AWA promoter Verne Gagne) Greg Gagne on the Spectacular Legacy of the AWA DVD, AWA All-Star Wrestling was the second highest rated program in St. Paul, Minnesota (behind only 60 Minutes). All-Star Wrestling at its peak, earned a 25 rating and a 64 share.

=== Notable markets ===
Every Tuesday, 20-30 wrestlers would be flown into Minneapolis to tape market specific interviews promoting the upcoming live events in various areas:

- Chicago
- Denver
- Green Bay
- Las Vegas
- Milwaukee
- Minneapolis
- Omaha
- Phoenix
- Salt Lake City
- San Francisco
- Winnipeg

== See also ==
- AWA on television
