= Greg Gagne (wrestler) =

American professional wrestler (born 1948)

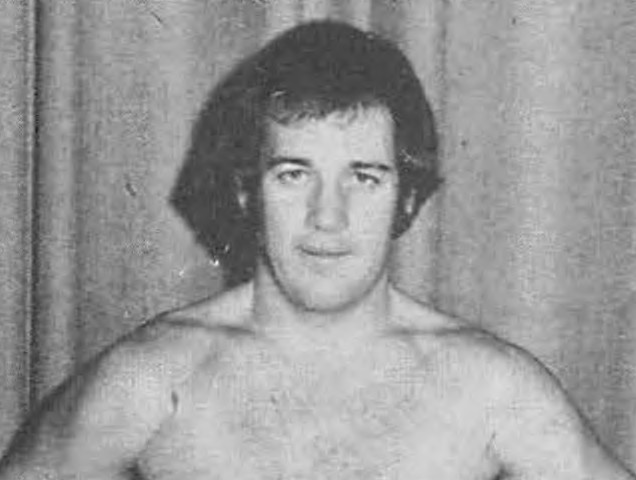
- Gagne, circa 1979

Personal information
- Born: Gregory Alan Gagne; November 27, 1948 (age 77) Robbinsdale, Minnesota, U.S.
- Spouse: Mary Graiziger (m. 1978; died 2019)
- Children: 3
- Parent: Verne Gagne (father)
- Family: Larry Zbyszko (brother-in-law)

Professional wrestling career
- Ring name: Greg Gagne
- Billed height: 6 ft 2 in (188 cm)
- Billed weight: 210 lb (95 kg)
- Billed from: Mound, Minnesota
- Trained by: Verne Gagne
- Debut: April 15, 1973
- Retired: May 1991

Gregory Alan Gagne (/ˈɡɑːnjeɪ/ GAHN-yay; born November 27, 1948) is an American retired professional wrestler. He is the son of Verne Gagne. In the late 1970s and early 1980s, he achieved his biggest success as one-half of tag team the High Flyers with Jim Brunzell. The High Flyers enjoyed a number of high-profile feuds within the American Wrestling Association (AWA) with the likes of Bobby Duncum and Blackjack Lanza, Pat Patterson and Ray "The Crippler" Stevens, the East-West Connection (Adrian Adonis and Jesse "The Body" Ventura), and the Sheiks (Ken Patera and Jerry Blackwell).

== Professional wrestling career ==
=== American Wrestling Association (1972-1991) ===
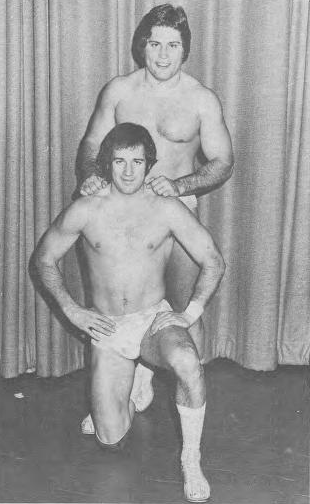
The High Flyers, Gagne (bottom) and Jim Brunzell (top), circa 1978

Schooled in the fundamentals of amateur wrestling by his father as a teenager, Gagne started wrestling professionally in 1972 in his father's promotion, the American Wrestling Association (AWA). In his debut match, he defeated Kenny Jay on April 15, 1973. Gagne formed the team The High Flyers with Jim Brunzell, and on July 7, 1977 they defeated Duncum and Lanza to win the AWA World Tag Team Championship. The Flyers successfully defended the title in rematches with the former champions as well as other contenders within the AWA ranks for nearly 15 months before they had to vacate the title due to an injury that Jim Brunzell sustained while playing in a charity softball game. The title was awarded to Pat Patterson and Ray Stevens in late September 1978. The Flyers regained the title in June 1981 from The East-West Connection (Adrian Adonis and Jesse "The Body" Ventura). The Flyers held the title for a little more than two years before dropping it to Ken Patera and Jerry Blackwell on June 26, 1983. Though the Flyers came close to regaining the title on several occasions, they never recaptured it. The team parted ways shortly thereafter, with Gagne entering into singles competition while Brunzell worked frequently as both a singles and tag team wrestler before departing for the World Wrestling Federation in 1985.

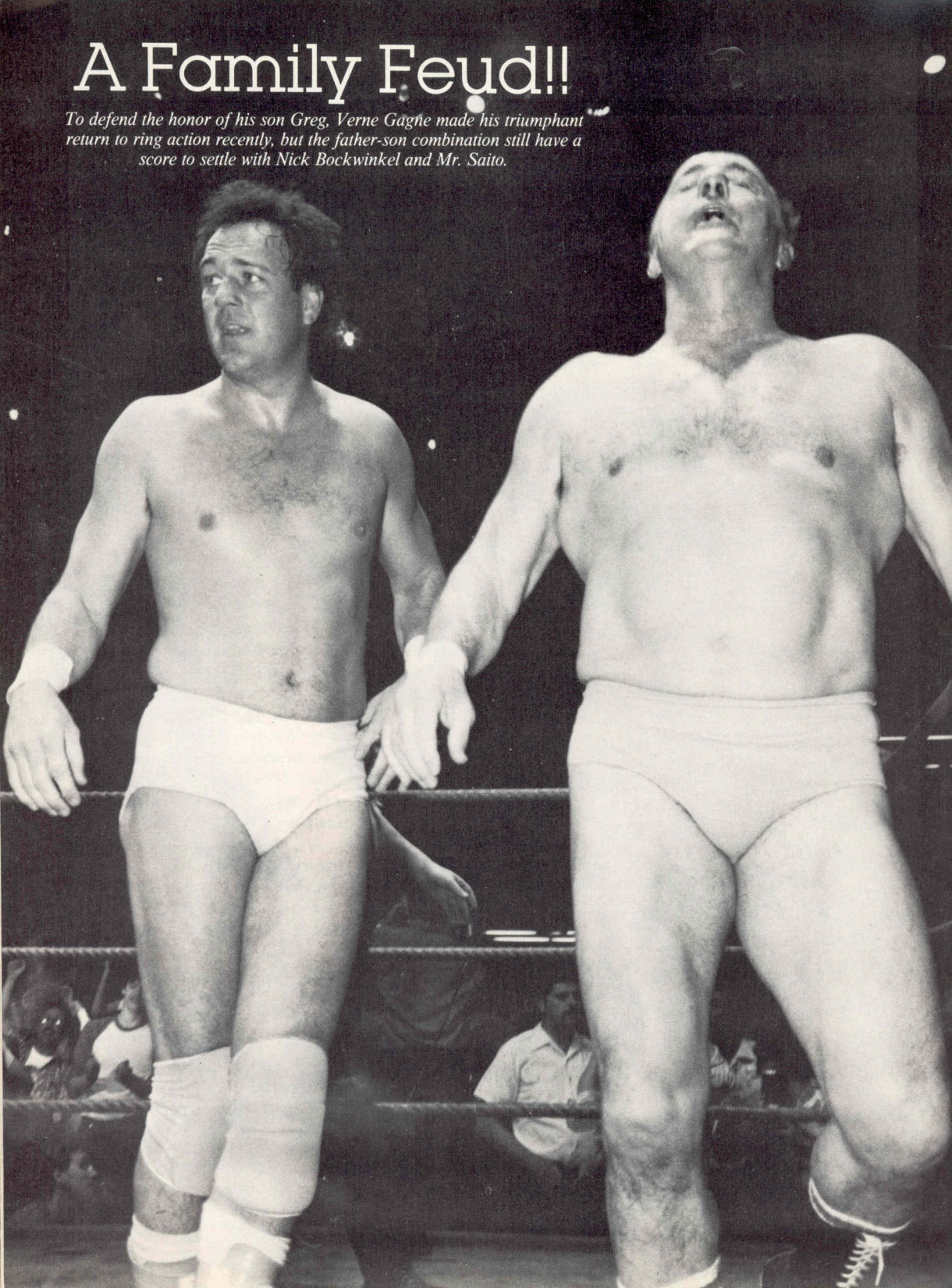
Greg (left) and his father Verne Gagne (right), circa 1985

From 1984 to 1986, Gagne was involved in a feud with Sheik Adnan Al-Kaissie's army, which at the time included King Kong Brody. The feud also saw Greg's retired father Verne return briefly for a number of matches. The David vs. Goliath feel to the Brody/Gagne feud boosted attendance at the time, a trend that might have continued, giving the AWA a much needed shot in the arm. Before the feud could be marketed to its full potential, Brody left the AWA. Meanwhile, in 1985, Gagne began an ill-fated and short-lived metamorphosis, becoming a member of Sgt. Slaughter's Cobra Corps. The idea saw a fatigues-clad Gagne teaming with Slaughter.

In the later 1980s, Gagne feuded with Curt Hennig, Ron Garvin, and Larry Zbyszko and briefly resurrected his feud with Sheik Adnan Al-Kaissie. His feud with Hennig over the AWA title only heated up when both fathers, Verne and Larry Hennig, became embroiled in the feud interfering on behalf of their sons during many of their matches. Gagne apparently won the title on several occasions only to have the belt returned to Hennig on technicality, à la the Dusty finish.

It was during this time that the AWA created the AWA International Television Championship. Gagne defeated Adrian Adonis in a tournament to be crowned the first TV champion. Ron Garvin defeated Gagne for the TV title in the fall of 1988, hitting Gagne with a foreign object to get the pin. The belt was held up until a showdown at SuperClash III. Gagne won the belt back as the result of a count out.

After SuperClash III, the AWA stripped Jerry Lawler of the World Title (Lawler eventually left the AWA and competed in the USWA as that federation's World champion). It was then decided that the new champion would be determined in a battle royal in February 1989. Many fans expected either Gagne or Slaughter to win the title that night and the crowd reacted with shock when both were eliminated late in the match. The crowd was even more stunned when Larry Zbyszko became the new champion by eliminating Tom Zenk to end the match. Gagne challenged Larry Zbyszko for the AWA World Heavyweight Championship at War in the Windy City, but was unsuccessful. It was also around this time the Sheik Adnan Al-Kaissie attacked Verne Gagne during an interview. As a result, Gagne turned his attention to Adnan in a feud that eventually involved a young Kokina Maximus. Gagne's wrestling career ended during a match for the vacated AWA World Tag Team Title. Gagne and Paul Diamond were facing The Destruction Crew in the finals when Adnan and Kokina came to the ring and confronted Gagne. Kokina slammed Gagne on the cement floor outside the ring and then splashed his leg, apparently doing damage to Gagne's knee. Gagne retired due to the injury and began to work in the broadcast booth and in production. Publicly, he enlisted the help of Jerry Blackwell to exact revenge on Adnan and Kokina. Despite the build up, the match never occurred.

Following an ongoing exodus of talent and the disastrous Team Challenge Series, the AWA became inactive in late 1990. The Gagnes made an attempt to revive the AWA in May 1991, but were unsuccessful. Gagne teamed with Wahoo McDaniel to face the Destruction Crew in the main event of the last AWA show promoted by Verne Gagne in May 1991. After the AWA closed for good, Gagne worked as a road agent for World Championship Wrestling for a couple of years. While working for his father's AWA, Gagne received $100,000 in workman's compensation benefits. This money would later play a role in his bankruptcy proceedings.

=== World Wrestling Entertainment and its predecessors (1977-1980, 2006) ===
Although he worked the majority of his career for his father's promotion, Gagne made some rare appearances in the promotion now known as World Wrestling Entertainment (WWE) .

On January 17, 1977, Gagne appeared in what was then called the World Wide Wrestling Federation (WWWF), in a match for WWWF TV-tapings at Madison Square Garden (MSG), where he defeated Johnny Rodz.

On April 24, 1980, Gagne defeated preliminary wrestler Jose Estrada in a match taped for television at MSG. By this time, the promotion had changed its name to the World Wrestling Federation (WWF).

Gagne next appeared for the WWF at the Showdown at Shea event on August 9, 1980, where he defeated Rick McGraw. This was his last match for the promotion.

Gagne made a return to WWE at the WWE Hall of Fame ceremony on April 1, 2006, to induct his father into the Hall of Fame.

=== Other promotions (1973-1988) ===
Apart from the WWF, Gagne made rare appearances in other territories, though many of these appearances would be the result of talent exchanges with the AWA.

In the Fall of 1973, he worked in Japan for International Wrestling Enterprise.

In 1976, Gagne would make his first appearance in wrestling outside his father's promotion, appearing at a Central States Wrestling (CSW) event, where Gagne teamed up with Pat O' Connor to take on the team of Baron von Raschke and Ernie Ladd.

Gagne's final appearance in CSW was when Gagne teamed up with Jim Brunzell to defeat the team of Bennie Ramirez and Moose Morowski.

Gagne would make multiple appearances through the course of 1977 and 1978 at NWA St. Louis Wrestling and Maple Leaf Wrestling, where he often would be paired up with Jim Brunzell to defend their AWA World Tag Team Titles.

Gagne would later appear in the Memphis-based Continental Wrestling Association (CWA), where he and Brunzell would successfully defend their titles against the team of Frankie Laine and Mike Boyer.

Through the course of 1982 and 1984, Gagne would often travel to Japan and make appearances for All Japan Pro Wrestling, where he would team with Jim Brunzell as well.

On May 11, 1984, Gagne and Brunzell appeared at a Georgia Championship Wrestling event, where they defeated the team of Jimmy Duke and Rooster Griffin.

On September 19, 1985, Gagne appeared at a Jim Crockett Promotions event, where he teamed up with Sgt. Slaughter (as Brunzell by the time had left the AWA for the WWF) to take on the team of Nick Bockwinkel and Larry Zbyszko. Bockwinkel and Zbyszko would win the match by disqualification.

Gagne's last appearance outside the AWA would come in 1988, at a CWA event, where he defeated Terry Adonis.

== Other media ==
Gagne appeared in the 1974 movie, The Wrestler. He also made a brief appearance in the movie Highlander during the opening scene at Madison Square Garden.

== Personal life ==
Gagne played football at the University of Minnesota from 1967 to 1969. He transferred to the University of Wyoming in 1970 where he played ten games as quarterback.

Gagne was married to Mary Gail (née Graiziger) and has three children. His sister Kathleen is married to fellow professional wrestler Lawrence Whistler, best known as Larry Zbyszko.

When his run with WCW was over, Gagne sold Mitsubishi cars in Minnesota. On April 30, 2006, it was announced that he would be working for World Wrestling Entertainment full-time as a road agent, starting at Backlash. He also worked at WWE's training camp Ohio Valley Wrestling (OVW). He later parted ways with WWE. He runs a small commodity trading fund on behalf of retired AWA talent. In addition, in 2009, Gagne opened a professional wrestling school in Mound, Minnesota. He has also coached football.

Gagne's wife Mary Gail, died on March 29, 2019.

== Championships and accomplishments ==
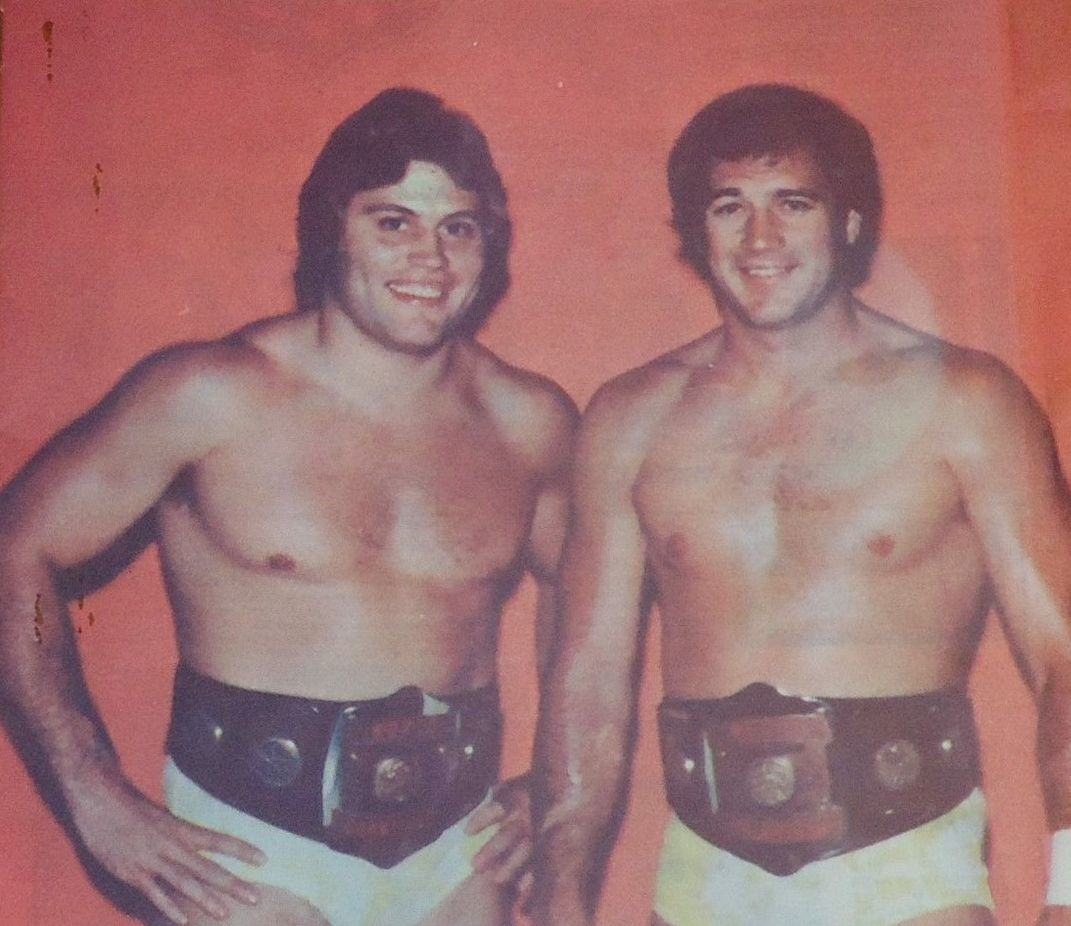
Gagne was a two-time AWA World Tag Team Champion with Jim Brunzell

- American Wrestling Association
  - AWA International Television Championship (2 times)
  - AWA World Tag Team Championship (2 times) – with Jim Brunzell
- Cauliflower Alley Club
  - Tag Team Award (2016) – with Jim Brunzell
- George Tragos/Lou Thesz Professional Wrestling Hall of Fame
  - Class of 2024
- Pro Wrestling Illustrated
  - PWI Tag Team of the Year (1982) with Jim Brunzell
  - Ranked No. 169 of the 500 best singles wrestlers during the "PWI Years" in 2003
  - Ranked No. 49 of the 100 best tag teams of the "PWI Years" with Jim Brunzell in 2003.
- Pro Wrestling This Week
  - Wrestler of the Week (January 10–16, 1988)
  - Wrestler of the Week (March 20–26, 1988) tied with Steve O
