= American Wrestling Association =

American professional wrestling promotion

- Trade name: AWA
- Formerly: Minneapolis Boxing & Wrestling Club
- Type: Private
- Industry: Professional wrestling
- Founded: 1960 (as AWA)
- Founder: Verne Gagne and Wally Karbo (as AWA)
- Defunct: 1991
- Fate: Assets owned by WWE
- Successor: AWA Superstars of Wrestling (unofficial)
- Headquarters: Minneapolis, Minnesota, U.S.
- Owner: Verne Gagne (until 2003); Vince McMahon (2003–2023); TKO Group Holdings (2023–present)
- Parent: WWE (after 2003)
- Website: AWA on WWE.com

The American Wrestling Association (AWA) was an American professional wrestling promotion based in Minneapolis, Minnesota, that ran from 1960 until 1991. It was founded by Verne Gagne and Wally Karbo. The promotion was born out of the Minneapolis Boxing & Wrestling Club, originally founded in 1933, which served as the Minnesota-based territory of the National Wrestling Alliance (NWA) from 1948 onward, before breaking away from the NWA and becoming an independent territory in 1960.

== History ==
=== Pre-AWA years (1933–1960) ===
Anton Stecher, brother and manager of former World Heavyweight Champion Joe Stecher, was a founding member of the NWA in 1948 and had promoted wrestling in Minneapolis since 1933 through his Minneapolis Boxing and Wrestling Club. In 1952, he sold a one-third interest in the promotion to his son Dennis and Wally Karbo. Stecher died on October 9, 1954, and control of the promotion passed to Karbo and Dennis. Verne Gagne, an amateur wrestling champion, had become a well-known and popular wrestler nationally in the 1950s as a result of his appearances on the DuMont Network. He aspired to become NWA World Champion, but political sentiment within the NWA prevented it. In 1959, Dennis sold his majority stake in the Minneapolis Boxing and Wrestling Club to Karbo and Gagne. They then became co-owners of the promotion.

=== Breaking from the NWA (1960) ===
In 1960, after unsuccessfully lobbying the NWA for a title match between Gagne and the NWA World Champion Pat O'Connor, Gagne and Karbo led certain territories out of the NWA forming the AWA. The AWA unilaterally recognized NWA World Champion Pat O'Connor as AWA World Champion and gave him 90 days to defend the AWA title against Gagne. The NWA ignored the challenge. O'Connor was stripped of the AWA title and it was awarded to Gagne on August 16, 1960. While O'Connor was considered the first AWA Champion, he didn't wrestle in the AWA until later in the 1960s (when he teamed with Wilbur Snyder to win the AWA World Tag Team Championship).

Gagne was an amateur wrestling champion who had earned a spot on the U.S. team at the 1948 Summer Olympics; he ran the AWA with a conservative sensibility, firmly believing that sound technical wrestling should be the basis of a pro-wrestling company. Starting in the 1970s, Gagne trained his newcomer wrestlers from his farm in Chanhassen, Minnesota.

=== Expanding the territory (1960s–1980s) ===
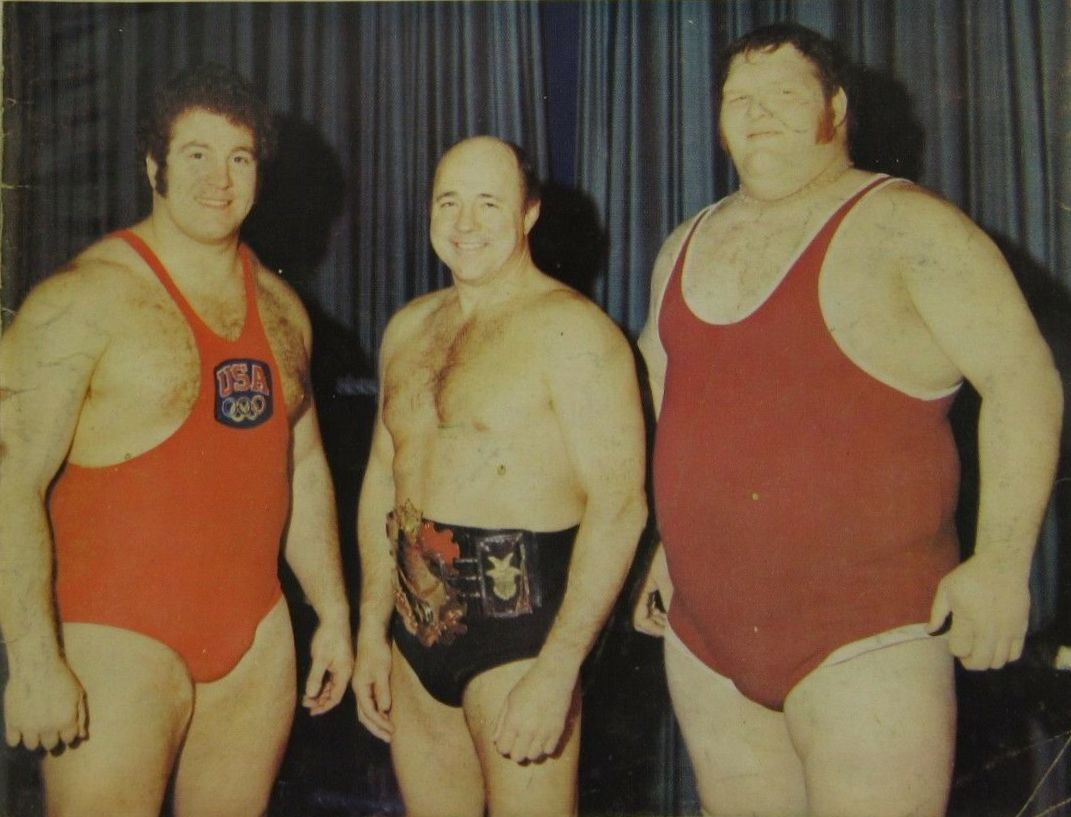
Ken Patera, Verne Gagne and Chris Taylor in 1974

Under Gagne and Karbo, the AWA became one of the most successful and expansive single territories in North America, promoting shows in such major cities as Minneapolis, St. Paul, Milwaukee, Chicago, Omaha, Winnipeg, Denver, Salt Lake City, Las Vegas, San Francisco, Phoenix and throughout the Midwest region. Relationships were also developed with existing promotions in Houston, Memphis and San Antonio. Gagne's westward expansion into traditional NWA territories was made possible due to relationships and business partnerships he had forged for decades—more the result of other promoters struggling to survive rather than by purchase or hostile takeover by Gagne. The AWA would also benefit from, among other things, the profits which was made from matches that occurred in 1973 and 1974 between Superstar Billy Graham and Wahoo McDaniel.

The promotion was briefly affiliated with International Championship Wrestling (ICW), which had broken away from NWA Tri-State in 1977, and recognized then AWA World Heavyweight Champion Nick Bockwinkel as the "real" world champion. Bockwinkel, accompanied by then manager Bobby "The Brain" Heenan, traveled to Mississippi several times to defend his title.

=== Nick Bockwinkel vs. Hulk Hogan (1982–1983) ===
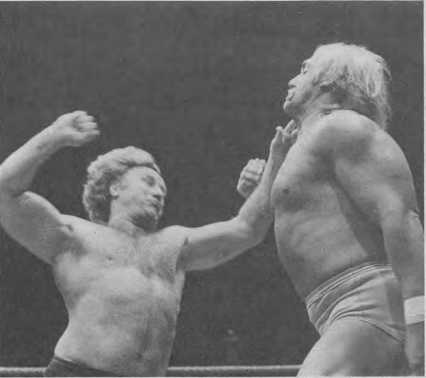
Nick Bockwinkel (left) and Hulk Hogan during an AWA match, 1982

After Gagne's retirement in 1981, he focused the promotion on Nick Bockwinkel, a loyal employee of several years who was a mat-wrestling technician like Gagne had been. Bockwinkel faced numerous challengers for the title during the early 1980s including eventual champions Rick Martel and Otto Wanz, champion Mad Dog Vachon, and perennial contenders Wahoo McDaniel, and Brad Rheingans, but perhaps his most famous opponent would be Hulk Hogan. Starting in 1982 and accelerated by a role in the hit film Rocky III, Hogan rapidly caught on as a babyface with AWA fans, and became the AWA's top draw. But even as his popularity grew to unprecedented levels, Gagne refused to make him the AWA World Heavyweight Champion, as Hogan was a powerhouse wrestler. He recognized Hogan's showmanship and charisma and was well aware of his potential drawing power, but still believed a wrestling company should be built around one of its best technical wrestlers (e.g., himself and Bockwinkel). On the Spectacular Legacy of the AWA DVD, Gagne denied bias against Hogan and defended his actions by reasoning that he believed that Hogan's pursuit of the title was the draw for the audience and that "we really didn't need him to be champion".

On two occasions, Gagne went so far as to tease AWA title wins for Hogan, only to return the title to Bockwinkel via technicalities. The first was on April 18, 1982. Hogan defeated Bockwinkel with the help of a foreign object that Bockwinkel's manager Bobby "the Brain" Heenan had interjected into the match. After the three count, the belt was awarded to Hogan and he was announced as the new champion. Heenan informed the referee of the object and the referee questioned Hogan about this, but the blood on Hogan's face was evidence that the object had also been used on him. The ref stood by his decision and Hogan left the arena as the new AWA World champion. Six days later on AWA television, AWA President Stanley Blackburn stripped Hogan of the title and returned it to Bockwinkel.

The second such occasion was on a AWA Super Sunday card in St. Paul in 1983. Hogan again pinned Bockwinkel, was awarded the belt and announced as the new champion. This time, Blackburn came to the ring moments after the match and tried to have Hogan retroactively disqualified for throwing the champion over the top rope a few minutes before the pinfall occurred. However, this match had been booked as a no disqualification match, which prevented this, so Blackburn simply stripped Hogan of the title and once again handed it back to Bockwinkel. The crowd (which had exploded in cheers when Hogan appeared to have won) almost rioted when learning that Hogan was once again cheated out of the title, and Bockwinkel later had to do damage control with the rabid crowd, telling the audience to calm down afterwards as well. Hogan attacked Bockwinkel and his manager Heenan. On the DVD The Spectacular Legacy of the AWA, it was revealed that Gagne planned to have Hogan win the belt that night, but only if he would give Gagne the bulk of the revenues that Hogan was earning from merchandise and his periodic main-event performances in New Japan Pro-Wrestling. Outraged at being strongarmed, Hogan refused, but nonetheless offered a 50/50 split instead. Gagne refused, and kept the belt from him. However, Hogan did admit in his autobiography My Life Outside the Ring that he still intended to stay with AWA and that Gagne had planned to book him in steel cage matches with Bockwinkel in an effort to expand the AWA to the New York market, but he decided to leave when Vincent K. McMahon of the World Wrestling Federation (WWF) offered him the WWF World Heavyweight Championship.

=== Talent jumps to the WWF (1983–1984) ===
As McMahon and his Connecticut-based WWF attempted to end pro wrestling's regional era in the mid-1980s (by establishing the WWF as a national promotion), Gagne made several decisions that caused his AWA to lose momentum in the emerging wrestling promotion war, including overemphasizing his son Greg Gagne in AWA storylines (which led to charges of nepotism within the company) and failing to make Hogan the top star of his company when he had the chance.

Frustrated by Gagne's business decisions, Hogan accepted an offer from rival promoter McMahon to wrestle for the WWF, in December 1983. One month later, Hogan became the WWF World Heavyweight Champion. He and the WWF soon became a mainstream media phenomenon and virtually synonymous with professional wrestling in much of the national consciousness, vaulting past the AWA and NWA as the premier promotion in wrestling. Hogan wasn't alone in leaving the AWA. Some of the AWA's other top talent, including announcer "Mean Gene" Okerlund, manager Heenan, and wrestlers Adrian Adonis, Ken Patera, Tito Santana, Jim Brunzell, David Schultz, Wendi Richter and Jesse Ventura also jumped to the WWF. As the AWA required talent to place a six-week notice upon leaving the company for booking and syndication-based reasons, most of the talent reportedly told Gagne that McMahon offered them more money to not work out their notices and previously scheduled appearance dates, which has been disputed by McMahon. Of the talent to leave AWA for the WWF in this time, only Heenan worked out his notice in good faith to the Gagne family.

The sting of the WWF expansion was not shouldered by the AWA alone. The Mid-Atlantic, Georgia, and Florida territories of the NWA also lost top stars such as "Rowdy" Roddy Piper, Greg "The Hammer" Valentine, Jack Brisco, Jerry Brisco, Ricky "The Dragon" Steamboat, "Cowboy" Bob Orton, Barry Windham, and Mike Rotunda to the WWF during that same time.

=== Pro Wrestling USA (1984–1986) ===
Despite this talent raid, the AWA went on to have another successful year in 1984, mainly because of the arrival of The Road Warriors and an angle uniting longtime heel Jerry Blackwell with Greg and feuding with former manager Sheik Adnan El-Kaissey. Although aging, most of the AWA's longtime core talent still remained. Stars like Bockwinkel, Ray "The Crippler" Stevens, The Crusher, Dick the Bruiser, Baron von Raschke, Mad Dog Vachon, and Larry Hennig were all still active at this time despite all being in their 40s or 50s.

In response to McMahon's expansion, the AWA forged an alliance with several NWA promoters, including Jim Crockett Promotions, Mid-South Wrestling, Pacific Northwest Wrestling, World Class Championship Wrestling, and the Continental Wrestling Association. This new promotion was known as Pro Wrestling USA and came about in an attempt to establish a national presence to compete against the WWF. The AWA was also able to sign top wrestlers like Sgt. Slaughter and Bob Backlund. By 1985, however, the AWA began to lose audiences, as the WWF was gaining wrestling superiority due to the success of WrestleMania I. Later in the year, as this struggle against the WWF progressed, Karbo also sold all his stock to Gagne as well. In September 1985, Pro Wrestling USA would respond to McMahon's rising success by promoting the first SuperClash. Despite this success, the Pro Wrestling USA collaboration did not last, as Gagne accused David Crockett of trying to sign away AWA talent over to the NWA backstage at numerous Pro Wrestling USA shows.

The AWA released an AWA Remco Action Figure line with the toy company Remco and a series of 30 minute videos entitled "Wrestling Classics", primarily featuring wrestlers such as Sgt. Slaughter, the Road Warriors, Jimmy Garvin and Steve Regal, and World Champion Rick Martel.

=== Decline and closure (1986–1991) ===
Despite falling behind the WWF and NWA as a major promotion throughout 1986 and 1987, Gagne still managed to find and/or develop legitimate young talent like Scott Hall (later known as Razor Ramon), The Midnight Rockers (Shawn Michaels and Marty Jannetty), "Bull Power" Leon White (later known as Big Van Vader), The Nasty Boys (Brian Knobs and Jerry Sags), and Madusa Miceli during that timeframe.

With the retirement of Bockwinkel imminent, Gagne tapped Curt Hennig (later known as Mr. Perfect) as his next champion and future of the company. Hennig, a talented and popular second generation wrestler, defeated Bockwinkel at SuperClash II. The overall card was relatively weak, but the title match was a critical success, although the title change was not without controversy, involving Larry Zbyszko and a roll of dimes. After further review by on-air AWA President Blackburn, and following weeks of speculation by AWA fans, the decision was upheld and Hennig was the new champion. Gagne pushed Hennig and The Midnight Rockers throughout 1987 and into 1988, but the WWF came calling and all three of his top stars would soon be gone.

During 1987, in an attempt to remain relevant and survive, Gagne renewed a relationship with Memphis-based promoter Jerry Jarrett and the CWA and even allowed Mid-Southern territory legend Jerry "The King" Lawler to win the AWA World Title from Hennig in May 1988. This was after the AWA flirted for months with the idea of giving Greg the belt, even awarding the belt to Gagne at a couple of house shows, only to return it to Hennig on a technicality. It was widely speculated that the idea of the younger Gagne as heavyweight champion did not play well with AWA fans, who seemed more interested in the involvement of Verne and Larry Hennig in the feud than they did with Greg actually winning the title, so Verne decided to go with Lawler instead. Michaels and Jannetty would drop the titles to Badd Company around that same time.

In February 1988, the AWA had both their World Heavyweight and World Tag Team Championships held up. On February 15 in Memphis, Tennessee, a World Tag Team Championship match between the Midnight Rockers and The Rock 'n' Roll Express ended in a no-contest, holding up the titles. A day later in Portland, Oregon, a World Heavyweight Championship match between Curt Hennig and The Grappler also ended in a no-contest, holding up the title. Six days later in Memphis, the Midnight Rockers defeated the Rock 'n' Roll Express in a rematch to reclaim the titles. Nearly two weeks later in Portland, as Curt Hennig was injured, The Assassin defeated the Grappler to help Hennig reclaim the title.

Facing financial trouble of their own, WCCW then allied themselves with the AWA and CWA, and Lawler would challenge WCCW Heavyweight champion Kerry Von Erich to a title unification match at SuperClash III in December. Super Clash III was the AWA's first venture into the Pay-Per-View market and wrestling's first collaborative PPV between several promotions. However, after months of hype, the end results were somewhat contentious and relatively unsuccessful. Following the event, the collaborative effort was over and Lawler was stripped of the title in January 1989. Lawler kept the AWA Title belt and continued promoting himself in Tennessee, Texas, and on the independent circuit as the unified World Heavyweight Champion. Lawler did this in an attempt to leverage PPV revenue from Gagne that was allegedly owed to him, but Gagne never paid him and eventually commissioned a new title belt of similar design.

In February 1989, Larry Zbyszko, a one-time employee and Verne's son-in-law, returned to the AWA and won the vacated World Title in an 18-man Battle Royal, eliminating Tom Zenk to end the match. It was also during this time that Joe Blanchard replaced Blackburn as AWA President. Zbyszko's first title reign would last for a little over one year. During this time, he would defend the title against Zenk, Greg, Wahoo McDaniel, Ken Patera, Nikita Koloff, Brad Rheingans, The Trooper Del Wilkes, and Masa Saito. Zbyszko would eventually lose the title to Saito in February 1990 in front of 65,000 fans at the Tokyo Dome at the NJPW/AJPW Supershow. Zbyszko would regain the title in April 1990 at SuperClash IV. During 1989 and 1990, the AWA also pushed Mike Enos and Wayne Bloom as the top tag team. In early 1989, Eric Bischoff, who was performing office work for the AWA at the time, mostly in sales and syndication, was placed in front of the camera to replace Larry Nelson as interviewer and occasional commentator. The AWA was Bischoff's first exposure to the world of pro wrestling. He would later become a dominant force in the industry, leading World Championship Wrestling to prominence in the 1990s.

The AWA would become inactive in the fall of 1990 (the last television taping occurred on August 11). As a result, Zbyszko signed with WCW. As his last official act, Gagne stripped the already-departed Zbyszko of the AWA World Title in December 1990. In 1991, Gagne and his inactive promotion officially filed for bankruptcy. Gagne did promote two cards in Minnesota in May 1991, featuring the return of Greg Gagne and Wahoo McDaniel and other stars such as Baron von Raschke, Buck Zumhofe, and The Destruction Crew (Mike Enos & Wayne Bloom), but he was unable to revive the promotion. Despite this, the AWA continued re-running matches in their weekly ESPN time slot, and on their syndicated All-Star Wrestling show. The company also managed to release a commercial tape (Hulk Hogan's Highlights) during 1991.

On the Spectacular Legacy of the AWA DVD, Bischoff revealed that one of the main reasons the AWA shut down was that Gagne was leveraging money against a valuable property he owned along Lake Minnetonka. Local officials wanted to turn the property into a park. Gagne fought the decision for several years, but eventually lost the eminent domain case, leading to the creation of Lake Minnetonka Regional Park. As a result, he lost the financial resource he was using to keep the AWA up and running and had no choice but to shut down the promotion.

=== Reunion events (1994–1995) ===
After a four year absence, Verne Gagne returned to promoting the American Wrestling Association on January 22, 1994 in Red Wing, Minnesota. The card, which drew 700 attendees saw AWA regulars such as Baron Von Raschke, Jim Brunzell, and Larry Zbyszko. Gagne promoted three more AWA events in Red Wing that year, and a final event on January 22, 1995 that saw Zbyszko defeat Wahoo McDaniel.

In an interview during the late 1990s with Minneapolis-St. Paul television station KARE, Gagne spoke of the devoted fan base in Minnesota and joked about how he may promote again some day, but nothing ever materialized.

=== Purchase by World Wrestling Entertainment (2003) ===
In 2003, World Wrestling Entertainment purchased the assets of the AWA from the Gagnes, with its programming and archives being added to the company's library.

WWE released The Spectacular Legacy of the AWA on November 21, 2006. The DVD includes a documentary on the amateur and professional career of Verne Gagne, the rise and fall of the AWA over its 30-year history, along with numerous interviews and features with Gagne, Hulk Hogan, Jim Brunzell, Michael Hayes, Baron von Raschke, Greg Gagne, Eric Bischoff, Bobby Heenan, Gene Okerlund and Nick Bockwinkel.

== International working agreements ==
Abroad, the AWA had working agreements with Japanese promotions International Wrestling Enterprise (1969 to 1980), then All Japan Pro Wrestling (1980 to 1988, although the relationship was strained in 1986 by the AWA Title debacle surrounding Stan Hansen), and, near the end, New Japan Pro-Wrestling.

On June 29, 1986, in Denver, Colorado, Hansen refused to lose the AWA World Title to Bockwinkel prior to a tour of Japan and left with the championship belt. Hansen argued that he was booked as AWA Champion in Japan and was therefore fulfilling his commitment. Gagne disagreed and awarded the AWA Championship to Bockwinkel, using one of the tag team title belts on a temporary basis. Gagne threatened legal action if Hansen continued to keep the belt and it was returned to the AWA as a result (although according to Bockwinkel on The Spectacular Legacy of the AWA, Hansen had run over the belt with his truck before returning it).

The AWA also had a brief relationship with the European promotion Catch Wrestling Association, through which its promoter, wrestler Otto Wanz, was given a brief AWA World Title reign in 1982.

== Events ==
=== Television ===
Throughout the 1960s and 1970s, AWA television production was headquartered at Minneapolis independent station WTCN-TV, then owned by Metromedia. The ring announcer was longtime Minneapolis–Saint Paul sports broadcaster Marty O'Neill, who also conducted the post-match interviews. O'Neill announced the matches for the local WTCN audience. But fans watching the syndicated version of the show heard commentary provided by Rodger Kent. In the mid-1970s, during a prolonged illness, O'Neill was occasionally replaced as ring announcer by program producer Al DeRusha and interviews were conducted by both Kent and Gene Okerlund. By 1979, Okerlund had permanently replaced O'Neill, who died a couple of years later, and production was transferred to Minneapolis station KMSP-TV. During the AWA's existence, it produced or had a hand in production of several TV programs:

- AWA All-Star Wrestling, the promotion's syndicated program, which aired from 1960 until 1991.
- AWA Championship Wrestling, which aired on cable sports network ESPN from 1985 to 1990; it was a continuation of the earlier ESPN program Pro Wrestling USA, the co-operative venture between the AWA and several NWA affiliates (most notably Jim Crockett Promotions).
- AWA Major League Wrestling, a Canadian program produced in Winnipeg, Manitoba, for that city's station, CKND, and syndicated across Canada during the 1980s.

In 1985, Gagne began airing weekly programming on ESPN, hoping to help the promotion compete with the national exposure already enjoyed by the WWF on USA Network and the NWA member Jim Crockett Promotions on TBS. However, weekly AWA shows were not treated with any priority by the cable network, sometimes being delayed, preempted by live programming, or suffering from occasional changes in time slot, making it difficult for fans to tune in on a regular basis.

On February 26, 2008, ESPN Classic began reairing AWA Championship Wrestling episodes, circa 1986–1990.

=== Pay-per-view ===
The AWA ran only one pay-per-view card, SuperClash III, during its 30-year run. However, From 1999 to 2002, a series of AWA-related pay-per-views were produced. Titled AWA Classic Wrestling, they featured compilations of old AWA footage, hosted by Greg Gagne and Todd Okerlund (son of Gene Okerlund), with occasional appearances by Verne Gagne. The pay-per-views ceased following the acquisition of the AWA tape library by World Wrestling Entertainment.

=== Supercards ===
SuperSunday

WrestleRock 86

SuperClash

== Tournaments ==
=== AWA World Tag Championship Tournament (1962) ===
The AWA World Tag Team Tournament was a one-night single elimination tag team tournament held in Saint Paul, Minnesota, on January 15, 1962, for the vacant AWA World Tag Team Championship.

Semifinals
Hard Boiled Haggerty and Bob Geigel
Tiny Mills and Wayne Bock

Qualifiers
Larry Hennig and Duke Hoffman
Hard Boiled Haggerty and Bob Geigel
The Miller Brothers (Bill Miller and Danny Miller)
Bob Graham and Don Jardine
The Kalmikoffs (Ivan Kalmikoff and Nikita Kalmikoff)
Joe Scarpello and Tony Baillargeon
Verne Gagne and Leo Nomellini
Ripper Collins and Aldo Bogni

Finalists
Larry Hennig and Duke Hoffman
The Miller Brothers
The Kalmikoffs
Verne Gagne and Leo Nomellini

Finals
Larry Hennig and Duke Hoffman
Verne Gagne and Leo Nomellini

=== AWA World Tag Championship Tournament (1989) ===
The AWA World Tag Team Tournament was a one-night single elimination tag team tournament held in Rochester, Minnesota, on October 1, 1989, for the vacant AWA World Tag Team Championship.

Semifinals
1 | The Destruction Crew (Mike Enos and Wayne Bloom)
4 | Sgt. Slaughter and Baron Von Raschke
3 | Mike George and Johnnie Stewart
2 | Greg Gagne and Paul Diamond

Final
The Destruction Crew
Greg Gagne and Paul Diamond

=== Team Challenge Series ===
In 1989, with the AWA weakened by a fluctuating and weakened roster, and the promotion seeking to find ways to revive viewer interest, a concept known as the "Team Challenge Series" was developed; the promotion's talent would be divided into three teams competing in a league, and earn points for their team by winning matches. At some unspecified point, the highest scoring team would share a (kayfabe) $1 million prize. Concurrently, the promotion was also developing a new syndicated television program featuring the Team Challenge Series, hoping to capitalize on the slate of sports entertainment-based shows entering the syndication market at the time (such as American Gladiators and RollerGames) in response to the success of the WWF's televised specials.

An unsold pilot for the new series—publicly released for the first time in 2018 by WWE Network's "Hidden Gems"—featured Ralph Strangis and Greg Gagne hosting and commentating from the WTCN-TV studio in Minneapolis (referred to as the "Satellite Base"). The matches were recorded in an empty studio with artificial crowd noise; entrances were conducted in front of a green screen "tunnel" with stock footage of fans reacting in restaurants, while the matches were also intercut with this footage. The pilot promoted the use of technology such as in-match instant replay and new types of camera angles, and also included a segment featuring foxy boxing from the Beverly Hills Knockouts.

While the pilot did not make it to air, the Team Challenge Series would go on from October 1, 1989, through August 11, 1990, via existing programming. All of the available wrestlers were divided into three teams: "Larry's Legends", headed by Larry Zbyszko, "Sarge's Snipers", originally headed by Sgt. Slaughter, and "Baron's Blitzers", headed by Baron von Raschke. Slaughter left the AWA to return to the World Wrestling Federation shortly after WrestleMania VI, and Colonel DeBeers took over as the team captain for the Snipers (the team name was changed to "DeBeers' Diamondcutters" and Slaughter was said on air to have "gone AWOL" to explain his departure). Babyfaces and heels alike were assigned to teams, forcing bitter rivals to work together, and due to main talent losses many of the participants were jobbers, such as Jake Milliman and Tom Stone. The Team Challenge Series would extensively feature gimmick matches, in contrast to Gagne's past preferences towards a more realistic and sport-like presentation.

Some of the earlier TCS matches took place in a pink-colored TV studio with no audience; the kayfabe explanation was that the matches were being held at a remote location to reduce interference, but it was actually due to poor ticket sales for arena shows. The remainder of the matches took place at the Rochester Civic Center, where the AWA taped live matches for its television program from 1989–90.

The final match in the TCS was a Royal Rumble-style battle royal featuring Brad Rheingans, The Destruction Crew, Colonel DeBeers, the Texas Hangmen, the Trooper Del Wilkes, and several others. Jake Milliman again came away with the win by eliminating DeBeers at the end, winning the series and the supposed one-million-dollar check for Larry's Legends.

== Championships ==
=== World championships ===
- AWA World Heavyweight Championship
- World Heavyweight Championship (Omaha version)
- AWA World Light Heavyweight Championship
- AWA World Brass Knuckles Championship
- AWA World Women's Championship
- AWA World Tag Team Championship
- NWA World Tag Team Championship (Minneapolis version)

=== International championships ===
- AWA International Heavyweight Championship
- AWA International Television Championship
- AWA Americas Championship
- AWA British Empire Heavyweight Championship
- AWA International Tag Team Championship

=== National and regional championships ===
- AWA United States Heavyweight Championship
- AWA Southern Heavyweight Championship
- AWA Midwest Heavyweight Championship
- AWA Southern Tag Team Championship
- AWA Midwest Tag Team Championship

== Unauthorized successor promotion and lawsuit ==
In 1996, Dale Gagner, a former AWA employee but no relation to Verne despite the similar surname, removed the "r" from his name and formed an organization in Minnesota known as AWA Superstars of Wrestling. In April 2007, WWE filed a lawsuit against Gagner, citing trademark infringement, as WWE owned all AWA properties due to their purchase after the AWA's closure. In a move to sidestep WWE, former AWA wrestler Jonnie Stewart trademarked the name "American Wrestling Alliance" but the United States Patent and Trademark Office later indicated that the request was abandoned in February 2008.

In October 2008, the lawsuit against Gagner was settled. The court ruling prohibits Dale Gagner and his associates from certain uses of the AWA name or any other derivatives. As a result, the organization was renamed to "Wrestling Superstars Live".

== See also ==
- List of independent wrestling promotions in the United States
