= Barry Orton =

American professional wrestler (1958–2021)

Personal information
- Born: Randal Berry Orton; May 28, 1958 Amarillo, Texas, U.S.
- Died: March 19, 2021 (aged 62) Las Vegas, Nevada, U.S.
- Children: 2
- Family: Bob Orton (father); Bob Orton Jr. (brother); Randy Orton (nephew)

Professional wrestling career
- Ring name(s): Barry Gaspar; Barry O Barry Orton; Barrymore Barlow; The Highroller; The Zodiak
- Billed height: 6 ft 1 in (185 cm)
- Billed weight: 235 lb (107 kg)
- Billed from: Las Vegas, Nevada
- Trained by: Bob Orton; Bob Roop; Tully Blanchard
- Debut: 1976
- Retired: 1991

Randal Berry Orton (May 28, 1958 – March 19, 2021) was an American professional wrestler and actor, better known by the ring name Barry Orton. He was a son of professional wrestler Bob Orton, brother of professional wrestler Bob Orton Jr., and uncle of professional wrestler Randy Orton.

== Early life ==
Randal Berry Orton was born in Amarillo, Texas, to professional wrestler Bob Orton and his wife Rita. He was named after professional wrestler Wild Red Berry. The family moved to Kansas City, Missouri, three days after his birth. He was a musician and performed in nightclubs, playing in many prominent club bands over the country. Disappointed by a "near miss" record deal in 1976, Orton switched to professional wrestling.

== Professional wrestling career ==
Orton made his professional wrestling debut in 1976, trained by Bob Orton, Bob Roop, and Tully Blanchard. During his career in wrestling he competed in the WWF as Barry O (1985–1988, 1990–1991), ICW, WOW, the NWA, the IWF and Stampede Wrestling (where, while appearing as the masked Zodiac, he managed Jason the Terrible) he was mainly used as an enhancement talent. In 1984, Orton wrestled for around three months under a mask as the Assassin #3 with Jody Hamilton. Orton was a replacement for Hercules Hernandez, who had recently been unmasked by Jimmy Valiant. In a 2005 interview with Slam! Sports, Orton said "I was always struggling because I wanted to be a musician. I never saw myself as a professional wrestler."

His career was affected in 1986 when he was driving under the influence and his female passenger died. The WWF would not allow him to wrestle until the matter was settled, and Orton went to Stampede Wrestling in Calgary as the masked Zodiac. Then in 1988 he worked for New Japan Pro-Wrestling as Barry Gasper teaming with Bob Orton as Billy Gasper. He returned to WWF in 1990 and also worked for Universal Wrestling Federation (Herb Abrams), Herb Abrams' promotion for a couple of appearances. Orton retired from wrestling in 1991.

Orton came out of retirement in 2011 for one night for Pro Wrestling Guerilla participating in a battle royal which was won by Roddy Piper.

== Acting career ==
In the 1990s, Orton made a transition from wrestling into movies, appearing in minor roles. He went to New York and began studying classical theatre, spending a year there studying with Robert Patterson. In 1991, he appeared in the role of 'Wild Thing' in the local Vegas TV show 'Vegas Rocks', which led to a local commercial along with a part in Honeymoon in Vegas. He starred in a film called 'Tweak the Heat', based on crystal meth awareness.

=== Filmography ===
Year	Title	Role	Notes
1985	Wrestling's Country Boys	Barry O.	
1992	Honeymoon in Vegas	Boxing manager	Uncredited
1999	Killer's Mind	Flex the Doorman	
2002	Monday Night Mayhem	Roadie	Uncredited
2002	Timecollapse	Steven	
2002	People I Know	Patron on stairs	Uncredited
2003	Mission Idiot	Dog Guy	Also stunt coordinator

== Personal life ==
Orton was married four times; all four marriages ended in divorce. He had two children, both of them daughters, from his third marriage.

During his life, Orton used the drugs valium and methamphetamine. He also carried a .44 Magnum handgun which he would threaten to use to kill himself. Upon a friend's request, Orton went to a therapist and eventually beat his drug addiction.

=== Sexual harassment lawsuit ===
In 1992, Orton appeared on the talk show, The Phil Donahue Show, along with Superstar Billy Graham, Bruno Sammartino and others to voice their concern about sexual harassment in the wrestling industry. Vince McMahon was also on the show to defend himself and the company. Because of Orton's vocal opinions against the WWF and the sexual harassment that was involved, he became blacklisted. Some were instructed not to talk to him, while many others were afraid to. Orton started going by a different name, Barrymore Barlow. Although he was not employed by the WWF at the time, he was a key figure in the lawsuit that was filed against the company. According to Orton, in 1978 on a trip between shows while employed by a faction of the NWA, Orton was traveling with a booker for the company, Terry Garvin. While on the drive, Garvin repeatedly asked to perform oral sex on him, offers that were repeatedly refused. At the time Orton did not speak up about the incident. However, when stories later broke that Garvin (who went on to work for the WWF front office) was involved in sexually harassing young ring boys working for the WWF, Orton came forward with his own story to back up the claims made against Garvin. Orton also brought up hearing from another ring boy while he was still employed by the WWF. According to Orton, the boy claimed that Garvin was doing things to make the boy uncomfortable.

== Death ==
On March 19, 2021, Orton died in Las Vegas, Nevada, at the age of 62.

== Championships and accomplishments ==
- Cauliflower Alley Club
  - Family Award (2005) – with Bob Orton and Bob Orton Jr.
- International Championship Wrestling
  - ICW Southeastern Tag Team Championship (1 time) – with Bob Orton Jr.
- Interwest Wrestling Federation
  - IWF Heavyweight Championship (1 time)
- Mid-States Championship Wrestling
  - MSCW Tag Team Championship (1 time) – with Terry Orndorff
- NWA Hollywood Wrestling
  - NWA Americas Tag Team Championship (1 time) – with Héctor Guerrero
- World Organized Wrestling
  - WOW World Heavyweight Championship (1 time)
