= ICW Television Championship =

Professional wrestling championship

Details
- Promotion: International Championship Wrestling
- Date established: September 9, 1980
- Date retired: 1983
Statistics
- First champion(s): Bob Roop
- Longest reign: Uncertain (Note: Due to gaps in the championship history it is impossible to determine this.)
- Shortest reign: Uncertain
- Oldest champion: The Masked Miser (56 years, 52 days approximately)
- Youngest champion: Lanny Poffo (27 years, 155 days approximately)
- Heaviest champion: Bob Roop (276 lb (125 kg))
- Lightest champion: The Masked Miser (200 lb (91 kg))

The ICW Television Championship was a singles championship in International Championship Wrestling. Because the championship is a professional wrestling championship, it is not won or lost competitively but instead by the decision of the bookers of a wrestling promotion. The championship is awarded after the chosen team "wins" a match to maintain the illusion that professional wrestling is a competitive sport.

== Title history ==
Key
No.	Overall reign number
Reign	Reign number for the specific champion
Days	Number of days held

No.	Champion	Championship change			Reign statistics		Notes	Ref.
No.	Champion	Date	Event	Location	Reign	Days	Notes	Ref.
1	Bob Roop	September 9, 1980	ICW show	Lexington, Kentucky	1	32	Wins tournament final against Randy Savage.	
2	Bob Orton, Jr	October 11, 1980	ICW show	Louisville, Kentucky	1	245		
3	Bob Roop	June 13, 1981	ICW show	Woodlawn, Illinois	2	(Note: The date the championship was won and lost has not been documented which means the championship reign lasted anywhere between 141 days and 170 days)		
4	The Great Tio	July 1981	ICW show	(Note: The location of the match was not captured as part of the championship documentation.)	1	(Note: The date the championship was won and lost has not been documented which means the championship reign lasted anywhere between 1 day and 59 days)		
5	The Masked Miser	November 19, 1981	ICW show		1	(Note: The date the championship was won and lost has not been documented which means the championship reign lasted anywhere between 1 day and 393 days)		
6	The Great Tio	May 13, 1982	ICW show	Beckley, West Virginia	2	7		
Championship history is unrecorded from May 13, 1982 to May 20, 1982.
7	Lanny Poffo	May 20, 1982	ICW show		1	(Note: The date the championship was won and lost has not been documented which means the championship reign lasted anywhere between 1 day and 333 days)		
Championship history is unrecorded from May 20, 1982 to November 1982.
8	The Great Tio	November 1982	ICW show		3	(Note: The date the championship was won and lost has not been documented which means the championship reign lasted anywhere between 32 days and 32 days)		
—	Deactivated	1983	—	—	—	—	Championship was abandoned for undocumented reasons	
