= Bob Orton Jr. =

American professional wrestler (born 1950)

- Orton in 2009

Personal information
- Born: Robert Keith Orton Jr. November 10, 1950 (age 76) Kansas City, Missouri, U.S.
- Spouse: Elaine Orton (m. 1968)
- Children: 3, including Randy
- Family: Bob Orton (father); Barry Orton (brother)

Professional wrestling career
- Ring name(s): Bob Orton Jr. Bob Orton; The Invader; Billy Gaspar
- Billed height: 6 ft 1 in (185 cm)
- Billed weight: 242 lb (110 kg)
- Billed from: Kansas City, Missouri
- Trained by: Hiro Matsuda; Eddie Graham; Jack Brisco
- Debut: 1972
- Retired: 2025

Robert Keith Orton Jr. (born November 10, 1950), known by his ring name "Cowboy" Bob Orton, is an American retired professional wrestler. He is a son of professional wrestler Bob Orton Sr., the brother of professional wrestler Barry Orton, and the father of professional wrestler Randy Orton. He is best known for his time in the World Wrestling Federation (WWF, now WWE), including his involvement in the main event of the inaugural WrestleMania. He has also wrestled for several promotions in the United States, Japan, and other countries.

== Professional wrestling career ==
=== Championship Wrestling from Florida (1972–1980) ===
In 1972, Orton began his career in Championship Wrestling from Florida, initially as a referee for promoter Eddie Graham. Early in his career, he wrestled as part of tag teams with Bob Roop and Mr. Wrestling II, with whom he won the NWA Georgia Tag Team Championship on June 9, 1973. Orton was one of the first wrestlers to use the superplex as his finishing move.

=== American Wrestling Association (1976, 1978, 1988) ===
Orton worked for Verne Gagne's American Wrestling Association (AWA) in 1976 and 1978, mostly under the tutelage of manager Bobby Heenan. He was involved in a feud with Greg Gagne; a match between the two was featured on the AWA undercard for the Muhammad Ali-Antonio Inoki mixed martial arts match. Orton had a brief stint back in the AWA in early 1988, during which he renewed his alliance with Adrian Adonis from the WWF.

=== National Wrestling Alliance (1980–1982) ===
Following experiencing success in the Florida, Central States, and Mid-South regions, Orton competed in the National Wrestling Alliance in 1980 and 1981 using a cowboy's gimmick. While he competed in the NWA, he won several matches and earned a reputation as a hard worker and legit tough wrestler. In 1982, he left the NWA to sign a contract with the World Wrestling Federation.

=== World Wrestling Federation (1982) ===
On February 16, 1982, Orton made his debut for the World Wrestling Federation (WWF), defeating Victor Mercado. He scored a count-out victory over WWF Heavyweight Champion Bob Backlund on April 8 and challenged him for the title in several rematches over the following months, which ran in some of the largest cities on the WWF circuit, but he ultimately failed to win the title.

=== Return to NWA (1982–1984) ===
Orton returned to the NWA in 1982, and together with Dick Slater, feuded with Ric Flair. Orton and Slater interfered in Flair's return match against NWA World Champion Harley Race, who had beaten Flair for the title. They attacked Flair with an aided piledriver, which caused Flair a severe injury in the neck and put Flair out of wrestling for several months, collecting a bounty placed on Flair's head by Race, who was reluctant to wrestle Flair in return matches for the title. In the run-up to this incident, Orton had been portrayed as a babyface and a long-time friend of Flair; his participation in the attack was portrayed as the betrayal of that friendship. Flair would eventually return in late 1983, attacking both Orton and Slater with a baseball bat. At Starrcade '83: A Flare for the Gold on November 24, Orton and Slater defeated Mark Youngblood and Wahoo McDaniel. He captured the NWA World Tag Team Championship with Don Kernodle on January 8, 1984. The duo held the title for two months before losing it on March 4 to Youngblood and McDaniel.

=== Return to WWF (1984–1987, 1989, 1990) ===
Orton re-joined the WWF in March 1984, became Roddy Piper's bodyguard and was often addressed as "Ace" Orton. His other gimmick, wearing a cast during his matches, stemmed from legitimately having his left forearm broken in a match with Jimmy Snuka at the 1985 event The War to Settle the Score in Madison Square Garden. Although the injury healed in real life, the "cast" gimmick involved Orton—on "doctor's orders"—continuing to wear the cast, claiming the injury had not healed; Orton instead would use the cast to his advantage, striking his opponents behind the referee's back. On an episode of WWE Confidential, he admitted that his injury was not a work and did not heal when he wore the cast.

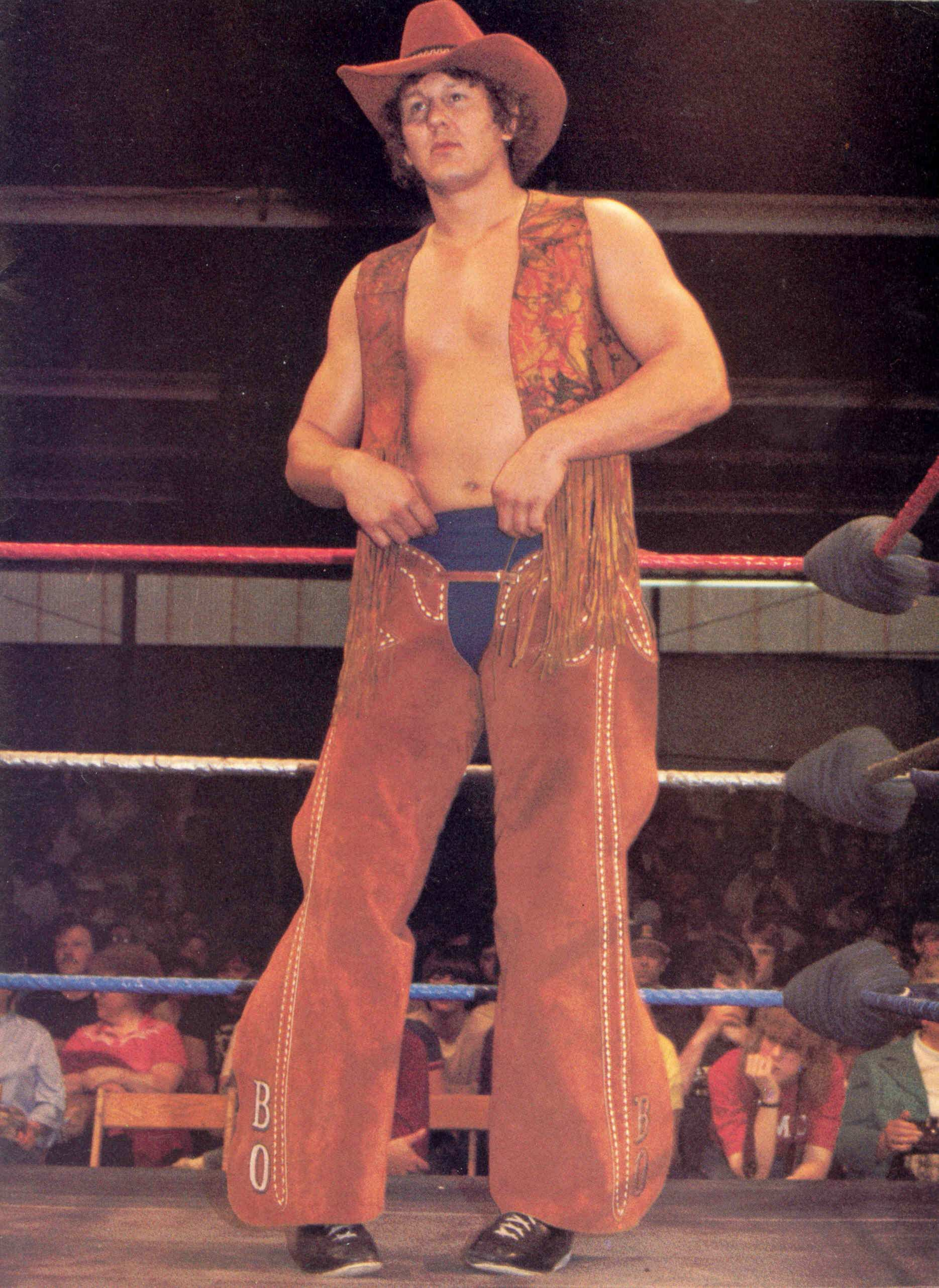
Bob Orton Jr. in April 1985

On March 31, 1985, Orton was involved in the main event of the inaugural WrestleMania pay-per-view at Madison Square Garden, being in the corner of Piper and 'Mr. Wonderful' Paul Orndorff in their match against Hulk Hogan and Mr. T. Orton accidentally cost his team the match after an attempted cheat backfired, resulting in him hitting Orndorff with the cast. Orton also competed in the main event for the WWF Heavyweight Championship against Hulk Hogan on the inaugural Saturday Night's Main Event on May 11, but lost by disqualification after interference from Piper. Orton took part in the 1985 King of the Ring tournament on July 8 and fought Orndorff to a double disqualification.

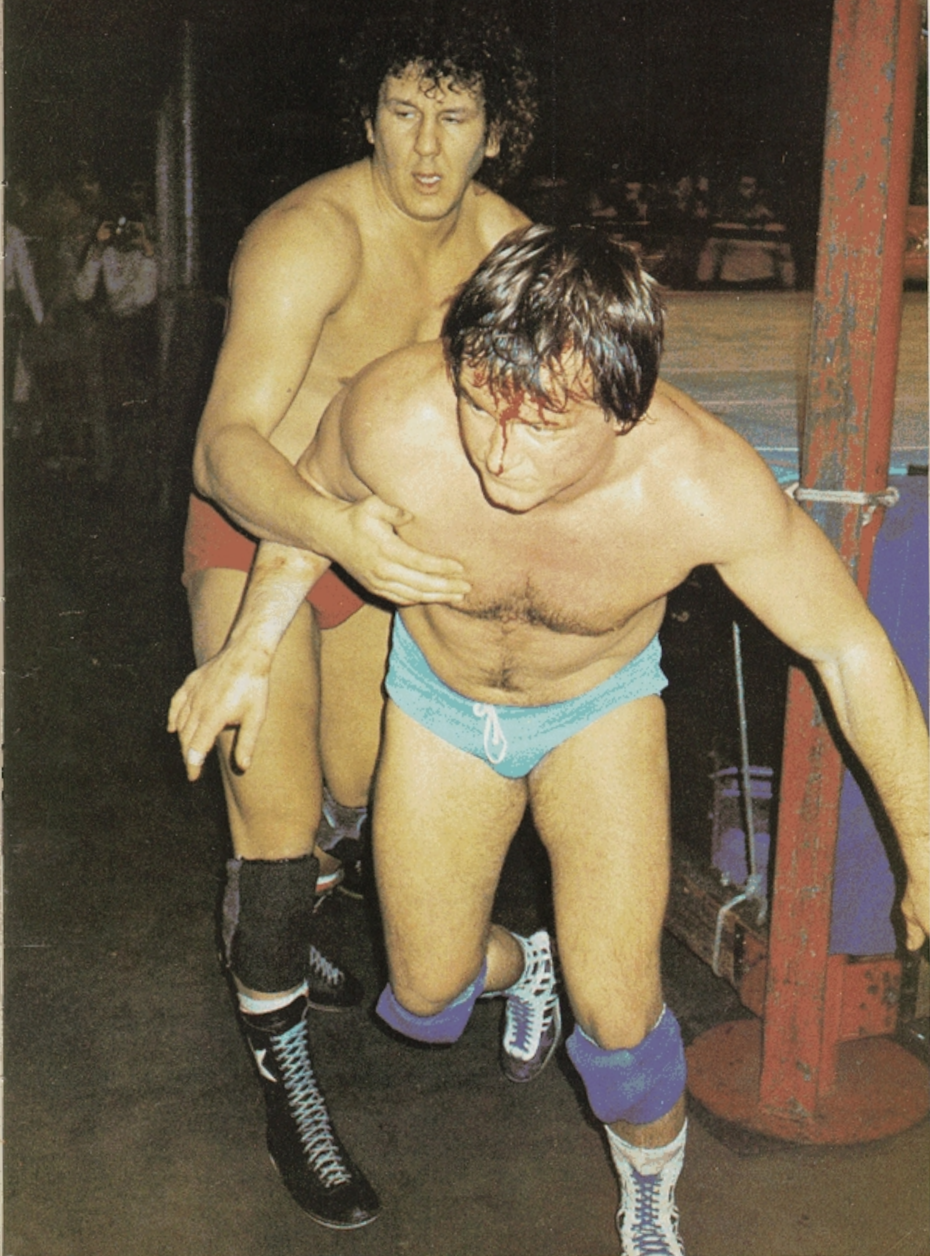
Orton Jr. (back) assisting Roddy Piper (front) in October 1986

In early 1986, Orndorff began wearing a cast as a neutralizer, and the WWF ordered both men to remove their casts. Orton was dubbed "Boxing" Bob and "Battling" Bob after the cast came off and lost to Mr. T at Saturday Night's Main Event V on March 1, which served as a setup for the Piper-Mr. T match at WrestleMania 2. Prior to the event, "Boxing" Bob Orton defeated Jose Luis Rivera in a boxing match. Piper and Orton went their separate ways after WrestleMania, after which Orton became the bodyguard for Piper's talk-segment successor "Adorable" Adrian Adonis, now sporting a pink cowboy hat. When Piper returned later in the year to reclaim his talk show segment, Orton betrayed his long-time friend, sparking a violent feud between the two, which saw Orton lose to Piper at Saturday Night's Main Event VIII on November 29.

Orton also formed a tag team with Don Muraco, with the duo managed by Mr. Fuji and occasionally Jimmy Hart. At WrestleMania III on March 29, 1987, they lost to the Can-Am Connection (Rick Martel and Tom Zenk). The team of Muraco and Orton got into a series of matches with The Killer Bees (B. Brian Blair and Jumpin' Jim Brunzell) and were notable for being the first team alongside Tiger Chung Lee to lose to The Young Stallions (Jim Powers and Paul Roma) alongside Tito Santana. Later in the year, Muraco and Orton found themselves on the losing end to upper-card teams and started arguing during their matches; this led to a match on WWF Superstars of Wrestling where Orton caused him and Muraco to lose a match when Orton kept Muraco from performing his finishing move, the superplex, thinking he was trying to steal the hold. This led to a brawl between both wrestlers, splitting up their team. On September 7, Orton and Muraco faced off at a house show, but the match ended in a double disqualification. Orton's last match with the WWF came on November 7, facing Sam Houston to a draw in his home state of Missouri. He was subsequently fired after being arrested for causing a disturbance at a Calgary airport.

Orton made a one-time return to the WWF on October 11, 1989, losing to Ted DiBiase at a house show in Springfield, Illinois. In April 1990, Orton, who was wrestling for the Arena Wrestling Alliance, which at the time had an agreement with the WWF to exchange talent, again returned to face Norman Smiley at three house show matches in New Zealand.

=== New Japan Pro-Wrestling (1988–1989) ===
After leaving the WWF, Orton took a short hiatus from wrestling, inactive until February 1988, when Orton travelled to Japan. During this time, he wrestled for New Japan Pro-Wrestling, initially working with Tyler Mane where they formed the team of the Gaspar Brothers, two hockey-masked pirates, with Bob using the ring name of Billy Gaspar while Tyler used Gully Gaspar. However, Tyler left NJPW in May of that year, so Bob got a new partner in Karl Moffat, who called himself Barry Gaspar, and who in the future, would inherit the Gaspar Pirate mask to play his "Jason The Terrible" gimmick. They won several matches together, beating the teams of Nobuhiko Takada and Antonio Inoki, Kuniaki Kobayashi and Riki Choshu, Osamu Kido and Yoshiaki Fujiwara, Hiro Saito and Super Strong Machine and many others. After the team of the Gaspar Brothers ended, Orton briefly teamed with Dick Murdoch and Scott Hall in NJPW for the Japan Cup Elimination League. After wrestling a few more matches in 1989 with a low number of victories, Orton left New Japan.

=== World Championship Wrestling (1989–1990) ===
On March 30, 1989, Orton, managed by Gary Hart, made his debut with then-National Wrestling Alliance member, World Championship Wrestling (WCW), at a WCW Saturday Night taping in Atlanta, Georgia, defeating Shane Douglas. At Clash of Champions VI on April 2, Orton defeated former partner Dick Murdoch after interference from Hart. Murdoch eventually challenged Orton to a bullrope match after he had interfered in one of Orton's matches. On May 7, he lost to Murdoch in the bullrope match at WrestleWar. After the match, Orton's manager Hart started brawling with Murdoch, and then Orton attacked Murdoch with the cowbell of the bullrope, threw him out of the ring, choked him, and attacked the referees that were trying to stop him in the process. Orton made his last appearance at a house show in Kiel, Missouri on May 25, 1990, defeating Dutch Mantell.

=== Second return to WWE (2005–2006) ===
On the February 3, 2005 episode of SmackDown!, Bob Orton was announced as an inductee into the WWE Hall of Fame. The following month, Orton became entangled in his son Randy's feud with The Undertaker. On the March 31 episode of SmackDown!, Orton begged The Undertaker to show mercy on his son in order to distract him long enough for his son to sneak into the ring and hit the RKO. At WrestleMania 21 on April 3, he (unsuccessfully) interfered in the match between Randy and The Undertaker, striking The Undertaker with his cast. At SummerSlam on August 21, Orton interfered in a rematch between Randy and The Undertaker, this time enabling his son to defeat The Undertaker. Orton teamed with his son at No Mercy on October 9, defeating The Undertaker in a handicap casket match. On the October 28 episode of SmackDown!, the Ortons teamed with Ken Kennedy to face Roddy Piper, Batista and Eddie Guerrero in a six-man tag team match, which they lost after Orton submitted to Piper's sleeper hold. On the December 16 episode of SmackDown!, Orton disguised himself as one of the Undertaker's druids and carried The Undertaker's signature urn to ringside as The Undertaker came to the ring to confront Randy. Orton remained at ringside after the other druids had left, distracting The Undertaker and enabling Randy to attack him. Orton then handed Randy the urn, which he used to knock The Undertaker unconscious. At Armageddon on December 18, Orton (still holding the urn) accompanied Randy to ringside for his Hell in a Cell match with The Undertaker and interfered several times, but he was ultimately unable to prevent The Undertaker from delivering a Tombstone Piledriver to both Ortons and then pinning Randy. On February 13, 2006, Orton was released from WWE.

=== Independent circuit (1990–present) ===
Orton made appearances for the Five Star Wrestling Federation in Baton Rouge (headed by Grizzly Smith) and began wrestling for Herb Abrams' Universal Wrestling Federation (UWF) in 1990. He teamed with Cactus Jack in a loss to Wet'N'Wild (Steve Ray and Sunny Beach) at their lone pay-per-view Beach Brawl on June 9, 1991. On June 19, 1992, Orton won the UWF Southern States Championship, but lost it three days later to Paul Orndorff. He was awarded the UWF Intercontinental Heavyweight Championship at a television taping on July 24, 1993, which was only defended once and soon declared vacant. On September 23, 1994, Orton again became UWF Southern States Champion after Orndorff left the UWF, and defended the title against Finland Hellraiser Thor at that night's live wrestling special Blackjack Brawl; the match ended in a double countout. From August to November 1994, Orton made appearances for Jim Cornette's Smoky Mountain Wrestling (SMW), feuding with Bob Armstrong.

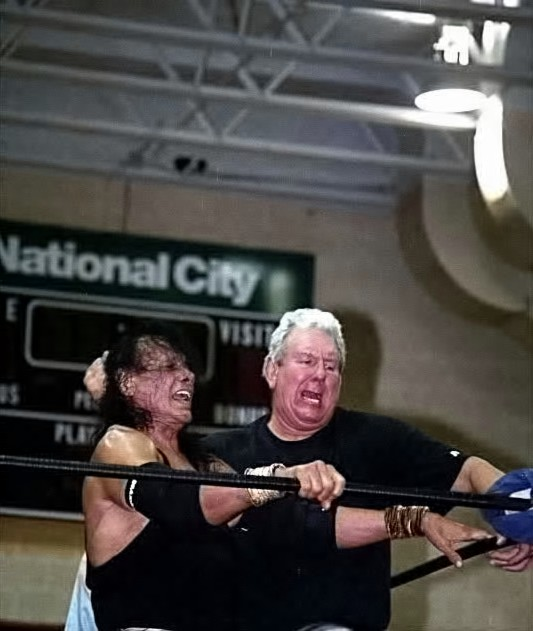
Orton (right) driving Jimmy Snuka into a turnbuckle in 2009

That same year, Orton wrestled for the American Wrestling Federation (AWF). On November 29, Orton challenged Tito Santana for the AWF Championship with AWF commissioner Jim Brunzell as the special guest referee, but lost. He won a battle royal on August 18, 1996, to challenge Santana in a title rematch, but again lost. On October 5, Orton defeated Santana to win the championship, before losing it back to him later that night. On October 10, 1999, he appeared at the Heroes of Wrestling pay-per-view, in which he lost to former rival Jimmy Snuka after interference from Snuka's manager Lou Albano. Following the event, Orton retired from wrestling and sold used cars near St. Louis.

In September 2004, Orton returned to wrestling for the Independent Wrestling Federation (IWF) as a special guest referee for the match between IWF Champion Roman and Shane O'Brien. On March 28, 2009, Orton appeared at the "Night of Legends" event by the International Wrestling Cartel (IWC), losing to Snuka. On October 17, Orton, accompanied by his youngest son Nathan, faced Harker Dirge for the Pro Wrestling Entertainment Championship at an Independent Hardcore Wrestling (IHW) event, losing by disqualification after Nathan attacked Dirge. In August 2010, Orton appeared for Juggalo Championship Wrestling (JCW) at "Wrestling Legend & Loonies", losing to Bob Armstrong. At a Pro Wrestling Guerilla (PWG) event on January 29, 2011, Orton participated in a battle royal, but was eliminated by Terry Funk. He returned to JCW at the "Legends and Icons" pay-per-view on August 12, teaming with Roddy Piper to defeat Funk and Mick Foley. On August 25, 2012, Orton appeared for Wrestling Past Present Future (WPPF) to face "Cowboy" Troy Hansen in a "Cowboy versus Cowboy" match (due to Hansen also using the "Cowboy" moniker), which Orton won.

On June 16, 2013, Orton and George South lost to Tim Horner and Tom Prichard at the Brad Armstrong Memorial event. On November 16, Orton and Dirge defeated the team of Attitude, Inc. (Guy Smith and Spencer Powers) at the monthly Pro Wrestling Glory show in Maroa, Illinois. On March 21, 2015, Orton teamed with Ricky Cruz and Red River Jack in a six-man tag team match with Nikolai Volkoff as their manager, defeating Attila Khan, Bull Bronson and Chris Hargas. In April 2015, Orton won a 2-on-1 handicap match against "Iron Man" Ken Kasa and Travis Cook for the St. Louis Wrestling promotion. On May 30, 2015, Orton was the Special Guest of Pinfall Wrestling Association in Springfield, Illinois at their biggest show of the year, The Grand Wrestling Spectacle V. Orton defeated Bradley Stephens III (who was looking for a "Legend" to challenge). On July 16, 2016, Orton, Gary Jackson and Ron Powers lost to Khan, Kahagas and Vic The Bruiser in a two out-of-three falls six-man tag team match.

On March 25, 2023, Orton and Tony Atlas defeated Bradley Diggs and Lamonte Potts to win the SICW Tag Team Championship, but dropped the titles back to them on July 8, with Flash Flanagan substituting for Atlas.

=== Third return to WWE (2010, 2012, 2017) ===
Orton made an appearance on the November 15, 2010 episode of Raw as the show went old school, with appearances from past WWE wrestlers, announcers and other on-air personalities.

He also appeared on the April 10, 2012 episode of SmackDown and was attacked by Kane (offscreen), who had been feuding with his son Randy at the time.

Orton appeared once again at Money in the Bank on June 18, 2017, situated in the front row of the crowd with fellow Hall of Famers Ric Flair and Sgt. Slaughter. During the WWE Championship match between his son Randy and champion Jinder Mahal, he was assaulted by the Singh Brothers as they were ejected from ringside, prompting Randy to attack the Singh Brothers; the distraction ultimately cost him the match.

== Other media ==
Orton appeared as a henchman in the movie Road House (1989) with Patrick Swayze and fellow wrestler Terry Funk.

== Personal life ==
Orton is married to Elaine Orton, a nurse at a hospital in Missouri, and they have two sons, Randy (also a professional wrestler), Nathan (a stand-up comedian), and a daughter, Becky. His first grandchild was born on July 12, 2008, when son Randy and his now ex-wife Samantha had their first child, a daughter, Alanna.

Around 1986, Orton was involved in an incident in Fresno, California, where the Fresno Police Department were called for an incident involving Orton and Roddy Piper in a hotel. He would end up naked and drunk on the roof of the hotel and was shot three times with police tasers.

=== Health ===
As a teenager, Orton was diagnosed with hepatitis C, but showed no apparent symptoms and would eventually no longer recall having the disease. Over 30 years later, in the midst of his feud with his son Randy against The Undertaker, Orton was retested and it was confirmed that he still carried the disease. The Undertaker was furious that he was uninformed of Orton's illness while Head of Talent Relations John Laurinaitis knew of Orton's disease. At one point in their feud (during a Hell in a Cell match at Armageddon 2005), Orton spilled blood directly onto The Undertaker, which could have caused him to contract the disease.

== Championships and accomplishments ==
- American Wrestling Federation
  - AWF Heavyweight Championship (1 time)
- Cauliflower Alley Club
  - Family Award (2005) – with Barry Orton and Bob Orton
  - Men's Wrestling Award (2025)
- Central States Wrestling Alliance
  - CSWA Heavyweight Championship (1 time)
- Championship Wrestling from Florida
  - NWA Florida Heavyweight Championship (1 time)
  - NWA Florida Tag Team Championship (3 times) - with Bob Orton (1) and Bob Roop (2)
- International Championship Wrestling
  - ICW Southeastern Heavyweight Championship (1 time)
  - ICW Television Championship (1 time)
  - ICW Southeastern Tag Team Championship (3 times) - with Barry Orton (1), Bob Roop (1) and Tony Peters (1)
- Mid-Atlantic Championship Wrestling
  - NWA World Tag Team Championship (Mid-Atlantic version) (1 time) - with Don Kernodle
- Mid-South Sports/Georgia Championship Wrestling
  - NWA Georgia Junior Heavyweight Championship (1 time)
  - NWA Georgia Tag Team Championship (2 times) - with Dick Slater (1) and Mr. Wrestling II (1)
  - NWA Macon Tag Team Championship (1 time) - with Dick Slater
- Mid-South Wrestling
  - Mid-South Mississippi Heavyweight Championship (1 time)
- Midwest Powerhouse Wrestling
  - MPW Heavyweight Championship (1 time)
- Powerhouse Championship Wrestling
  - PCW Heavyweight Championship (1 time)
- Pro Wrestling Illustrated
  - PWI Rookie of the Year (1973) tied with Tony Garea
  - Ranked No. 121 of the 500 best singles wrestlers of the "PWI Years" in 2003.
- Old School Wrestling Alliance
  - OSWA Heavyweight Championship (1 time)
- Southern Illinois Championship Wrestling
  - SICW Tag Team Championship (1 time) – with Tony Atlas
- Southeastern Championship Wrestling
  - NWA Southeastern Tag Team Championship (4 times) - with Bob Roop (1), Jerry Blackwell (1) and Ron Garvin (2)
- St. Louis Wrestling Hall of Fame
  - Class of 2024
- Universal Wrestling Federation
  - UWF Intercontinental Heavyweight Championship (1 time)
  - UWF Southern States Championship (2 times)
- World Wrestling Entertainment
  - WWE Hall of Fame (Class of 2005)
- Victory Wrestling Stars
  - VWS Television Championship (1 time)
- Wrestling Observer Newsletter
  - Most Unimproved (1986)
