= ICW Southeastern Heavyweight Championship =

Professional wrestling championship

Details
- Promotion: International Championship Wrestling
- Date established: May 26, 1979
- Date retired: 1984
Statistics
- First champion(s): Ron Garvin
- Most reigns: Ron Garvin (3 reigns)
- Longest reign: Lanny Poffo (At least 1 year, 0 days)
- Shortest reign: Uncertain (Note: Due to gaps in the championship history it is impossible to determine this.)
- Oldest champion: Ron Garvin (34 years, 282 days)
- Youngest champion: Lanny Poffo (28 years, 4 days)
- Heaviest champion: Bob Orton Jr. (248 lb (112 kg))
- Lightest champion: Lanny Poffo (221 lb (100 kg))

The ICW Southeastern Heavyweight Championship was a secondary singles championship in International Championship Wrestling. Because the championship is a professional wrestling championship, it is not won or lost competitively but instead by the decision of the bookers of a wrestling promotion. The championship is awarded after the chosen team "wins" a match to maintain the illusion that professional wrestling is a competitive sport.

== Title history ==
Key
| No. | Overall reign number |
| Reign | Reign number for the specific champion |
| Days | Number of days held |

| No. | Champion | Championship change | | | Reign statistics | | Notes | Ref. |
| No. | Champion | Date | Event | Location | Reign | Days | Notes | Ref. |
|---|---|---|---|---|---|---|---|---|
| 1 | Ron Garvin | May 26, 1979 | ICW show | (Note: The location of the match was not captured as part of the championship documentation.) | 1 | (Note: The date the championship was won and lost has not been documented which means the championship reign lasted anywhere between 1 day and 152 days) | | |
Championship history is unrecorded from May 26, 1979 to October 15, 1979.
| 2 | Bob Orton, Jr. | October 15, 1979 | ICW show | Knoxville, Tennessee | 1 | (Note: The date the championship was lost has not been documented which means the championship reign lasted anywhere between 1 day and 11 days) | | |
| — | Vacated | October 1979 | — | — | — | — | Championship vacated for undocumented reasons. | |
| 3 | Terry Gibbs | October 27, 1979 | ICW show | Knoxville, Tennessee | 1 | (Note: The date the championship was lost has not been documented which means the championship reign lasted anywhere between 1 day and 70 days) | Terry Gibbs wins a tournament for the championship. | |
Championship history is unrecorded from to January 6, 1980.
| 5 | Tony Peters | January 1980 | ICW show | | 1 | (Note: The exact date where Tony Peters won the championship has not been documented, which means the championship reign lasted anywhere between 70 and 88 days) | Sometime before January 19, 1980. | |
| 6 | Ron Garvin | March 29, 1980 | ICW show | Knoxville, Tennessee | 3 | (Note: The exact length of this championship reign is too uncertain to calculate.) | Still/again champion as of February 13, 1981. | |
Championship history is unrecorded from March 29, 1980 to January 1, 1983.
| 7 | Lanny Poffo | January 1, 1983 | ICW show | Springfield, Illinois | 1 | (Note: The date ICW closed in 1984 has not been documented which means the championship reign lasted anywhere between 365 days and 730 days) | | |
| — | Deactivated | 1984 | — | — | — | — | ICW Closed in 1984. | |
