= ICW Southeastern Tag Team Championship =

Professional wrestling tag team championship

Details
- Promotion: International Championship Wrestling
- Date established: July 1979
- Date retired: November 1980
Statistics
- First champion(s): Bob Roop and Bob Orton Jr.
- Most reigns: Bob Roop (4 reigns)
- Longest reign: Bob Roop and Terry Gibbs (91 days)
- Shortest reign: Bob Roop and "Big Boy" Williams (30 days at most)
- Oldest champion: Boris Malenko (46 years, 65 days)
- Youngest champion: Barry Orton (21 years, 126 days)
- Heaviest champion: Bob Roop (270 lb (120 kg))
- Lightest champion: Boris Malenko (220 lb (100 kg))

The ICW Southeastern Tag Team Championship was a short-lived secondary tag team championship in International Championship Wrestling. Because the championship is a professional wrestling championship, it is not won or lost competitively but instead by the decision of the bookers of a wrestling promotion. The championship is awarded after the chosen team "wins" a match to maintain the illusion that professional wrestling is a competitive sport.

== Title history ==
Key
No.	Overall reign number
Reign	Reign number for the specific team—reign numbers for the individuals are in parentheses, if different
Days	Number of days held

No.	Champion	Championship change			Reign statistics		Notes	Ref.
No.	Champion	Date	Event	Location	Reign	Days	Notes	Ref.
1	Bob Roop and Bob Orton Jr.	July 1979	ICW show	(Note: The location of the match was not captured as part of the championship documentation.)	1	(Note: The date the championship was won and lost has not been documented which means the championship reign lasted anywhere between 1 day and 30 days)		
Championship history is unrecorded from July 1979 to July 1979.
2	Masked Assassin and Colonel Yan Kim	July 1979	ICW show		1	(Note: The date the championship was won and lost has not been documented which means the championship reign lasted anywhere between 1 day and 60 days)		
Championship history is unrecorded from July 1979 to August 1979.
3	Ron Garvin and Terry Gibbs	August 1979 (NLT)	ICW show		1	(Note: The date the championship was won and lost has not been documented which means the championship reign lasted anywhere between 1 day and 90 days)		
Championship history is unrecorded from August 1979 to September 1979.
4	Boris Malenko and the Assassin	September 1979 (NLT)	ICW show		1	(Note: The date the championship was won and lost has not been documented which means the championship reign lasted anywhere between 1 day and 60 days)		
Championship history is unrecorded from September 1979 to October 1979.
5	Bob Orton Jr. (2) and Barry Orton	October 1979 (NLT)	ICW show		1	(Note: The date the championship was won and lost has not been documented which means the championship reign lasted anywhere between 73 days and 103 days)		
6	Bob Roop (3) and Terry Gibbs (2)	January 12, 1980	ICW show	Knoxville, Tennessee	1	91	Or sometime before February 16 1980.	
7	Bob Orton Jr. (3) and Tony Peters	April 12, 1980	ICW show	Knoxville, Tennessee	1	(Note: The date the championship was lost has not been documented which means the championship reign lasted anywhere between 41 days and 141 days)	Still billed as champions on May 23, 1980.	
Championship history is unrecorded from April 12, 1980 to August 1980.
8	Bob Roop (4) and Big Boy Williams	August 1980	ICW show		1	(Note: The date the championship was won and later abandoned has not been documented which means the championship reign lasted anywhere between 1 day and 30 days)		
—	Deactivated	November 1980	—	—	—	—	The championship was retired when Bob Roop was injured.	
