= Randy Orton =

American professional wrestler (born 1980)

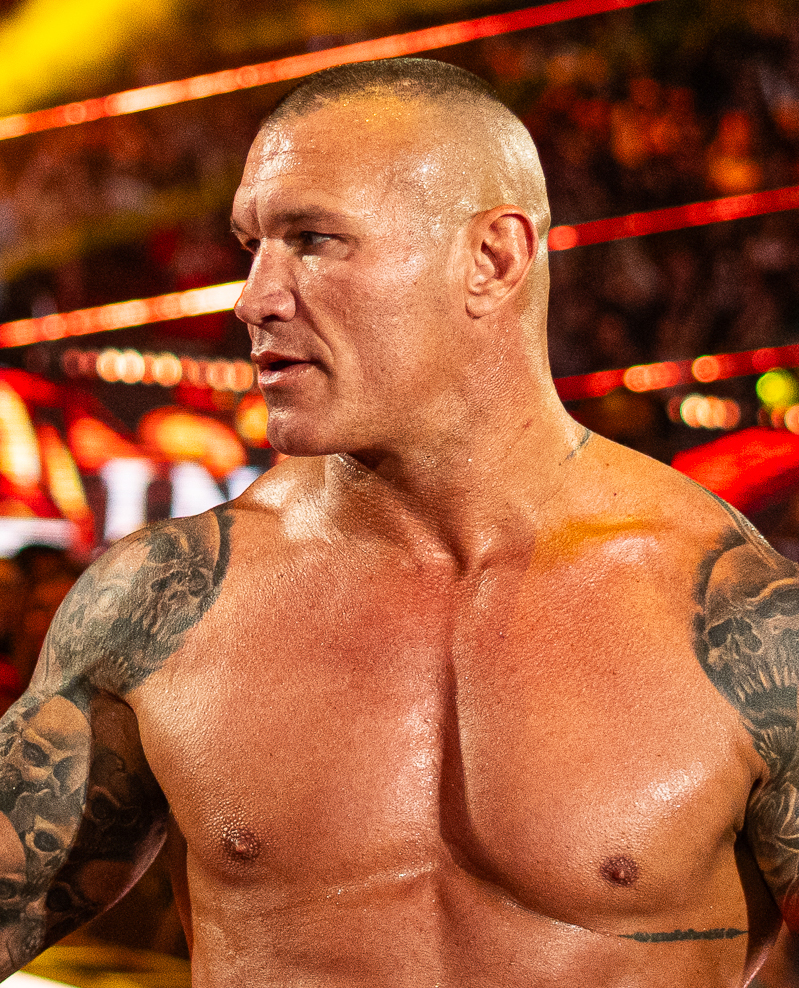
- Orton in 2024

Personal information
- Born: Randal Keith Orton; April 1, 1980 (age 46) Knoxville, Tennessee, U.S.
- Spouses: Samantha Speno (m. 2007; div. 2013) Kimberly Kessler (m. 2015)
- Children: 2
- Relatives: Bob Orton Jr. (father); Barry Orton (uncle); Bob Orton (grandfather)

Professional wrestling career
- Ring name: Randy Orton
- Billed height: 6 ft 5 in (196 cm)
- Billed weight: 275 lb (125 kg)
- Billed from: St. Louis, Missouri
- Trained by: Bob Orton Jr. Fit Finlay; Mid Missouri Wrestling Alliance; Ohio Valley Wrestling
- Debut: March 18, 2000
- Military service
- Branch: United States Marine Corps
- Service years: 1998–1999
- Rank: Private First Class
- Unit: 1st Battalion, 4th Marines

Signature
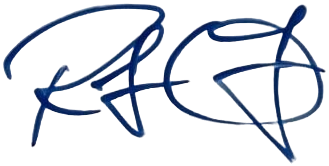

Randal Keith Orton (born April 1, 1980) is an American professional wrestler. He has been signed to WWE since 2000, where he performs on the SmackDown brand. Widely regarded as one of WWE's greatest professional wrestlers, (Note: Multiple sources analysing Orton's ranking in WWE or WWE-adjacant wrestling programs.) Orton has the tied-third most world championship reigns in history, and a career spanning over 20 years.

Orton is a third-generation professional wrestler; his grandfather Bob Orton, father Bob Orton Jr., and uncle Barry Orton were all wrestlers. Before being signed by the World Wrestling Federation (WWF, now WWE), he trained in and wrestled for the Mid-Missouri Wrestling Association-Southern Illinois Conference Wrestling (MMWA-SICW). He was then signed by the WWF and was sent to Ohio Valley Wrestling (OVW), where he held the OVW Hardcore Championship twice.

Orton debuted on the main roster in 2002, soon joining the Evolution stable, and as part of the group, became the youngest world champion in WWE history after he won WWE's World Heavyweight Championship in 2004. He was kicked out of the stable as a result, and entered singles competition. Orton has held the WWE Championship 10 times and the World Heavyweight Championship four times. He was the final holder of the World Heavyweight Championship, which he unified with the WWE Championship to become the WWE World Heavyweight Champion in 2013. In total, he has won 20 championships in WWE. Since 2021, he holds the record of most pay-per-view (PPV) matches in WWE.

== Early life ==
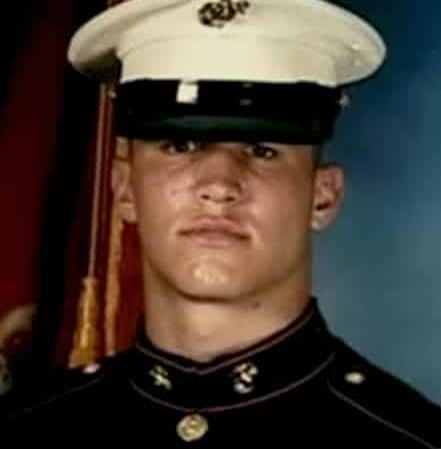
Orton as a United States Marine in 1998

Randal Keith Orton was born in Knoxville, Tennessee, on April 1, 1980, to a family of mostly German ancestry. His mother Elaine was a nurse and his father Bob Orton Jr. was a professional wrestler. Orton is a grandson of Bob Orton and nephew of Barry Orton, both professional wrestlers. He has a younger brother named Nathan, who is a stand-up comedian, and a younger sister named Rebecca. Knowing the hardships of life as a professional wrestler, his parents tried to convince him to stay away from the business and his father warned him that life in the ring meant a life on the road and away from family.

Orton attended Hazelwood Central High School, where he was an amateur wrestler. After graduating in 1998, he enlisted with the United States Marine Corps. At the base, he received a bad conduct discharge in 1999 after going AWOL on two occasions and disobeying an order from a commanding officer. Under the Uniform Code of Military Justice, he was tried and convicted under a special court-martial, subsequently spending 38 days in the brig at Camp Pendleton. He previously had a Marine tattoo on his left arm, but covered it up after receiving his bad conduct discharge.

== Professional wrestling career ==
=== Training and early career (2000–2001) ===
Orton made his wrestling debut in 2000 at the Mid-Missouri Wrestling Association-Southern Illinois Conference Wrestling (MMWA-SICW) in St. Louis, Missouri, an offshoot of the historic St. Louis Wrestling Club headed by Sam Muchnick. There, he was trained by both the staff of the promotion and his father, Bob Orton Jr. He wrestled for the promotion where he performed with wrestlers such as Ace Strange and Mark Bland. Orton also refereed a few matches with World Organized Wrestling (WOW), a promotion where his uncle Barry Orton worked.

=== World Wrestling Federation / World Wrestling Entertainment / WWE (2000–present) ===
==== Ohio Valley Wrestling (2000–2002) ====
In 2000, Orton signed a deal with the then World Wrestling Federation (WWF) and was sent to its developmental territory, Ohio Valley Wrestling (OVW) in Louisville, Kentucky, where he continued his training. During his time in OVW, he wrestled the likes of Rico Constantino and The Prototype. He won the OVW Hardcore Championship twice by defeating Mr. Black on February 14, 2001, and Flash Flanagan on May 5, 2001, respectively. On several occasions he faced Rico Constantino and The Prototype (John Cena). Orton in considered part of the OVW Class of 2002 as part of what has now been dubbed as the "OVW 4" alongside the aforementioned Cena as well as Brock Lesnar and Dave Bautista.

==== Evolution (2002–2004) ====
One of Orton's first official WWF appearances was March 16, 2002, at WrestleMania X8's Fan Axxess, where he was defeated by Tommy Dreamer. Orton's first televised WWF match was a victory against Hardcore Holly on SmackDown! on April 25, 2002. Soon after, Orton became a face and was placed in a rivalry with Holly. In September 2002, Orton was traded to the Raw brand, where he defeated Stevie Richards in his debut on the show. Within weeks of his debut on the Raw brand, Orton suffered a shoulder injury, leaving him sidelined for months. While recovering, Orton still appeared on Raw in his own Randy News Network (RNN) segment, a weekly vignette featuring him talking about his condition. The show interrupted other segments of Raw programming, which caused Orton to slowly transition himself into a narcissistic and self-centered heel.

After his injury healed, Orton joined the Evolution stable, which consisted of Ric Flair, Triple H, and OVW alumnee Batista. He was injured once again in February 2003, and returned on May 26, 2003. The group was pushed on Raw from 2003 to 2004, with the height of their dominance occurring after Armageddon in 2003 when all of the men's titles on Raw were held by Evolution members. In 2003, Orton spent much of his time helping Triple H overcome challenges for the World Heavyweight Championship. He joined Triple H in an Elimination Chamber match for the World Heavyweight Championship at SummerSlam on August 24, involved primarily to secure Triple H's title defense, and was eliminated by Goldberg, but the stable managed to fulfill its purpose and Triple H went on to eliminate Goldberg and retain his title.

Orton then began proclaiming himself the "Legend Killer", with his gimmick becoming that of a young upstart who was so talented that he touted himself as the future of wrestling. He embarked on numerous feuds with older, well-respected names in wrestling and gained infamy for blatantly disrespecting them. With the help of his stablemate and mentor Ric Flair, Orton defeated Shawn Michaels at Unforgiven on September 21 in the first of many high-profile matches billed as "Legend vs. Legend Killer". During this time, Orton began using the move that became his signature finisher, the RKO, a jumping cutter named after his initials. He defeated Rob Van Dam for the Intercontinental Championship at Armageddon on December 14. With this win, Orton started the longest Intercontinental Championship reign in seven years, holding the title for 210 days. Orton continued to establish himself as a "Legend Killer" throughout 2004, challenging the semi-retired wrestler Mick Foley. Famed for his brutal hardcore matches, they wrestled in a hardcore match at Backlash for the title, where Orton won. Orton named this match as the favourite of his career, also noticing it was the match where he earned the respect of the fans. On July 11 at Vengeance, he lost the title to Edge.

==== World Heavyweight Champion (2004–2005) ====
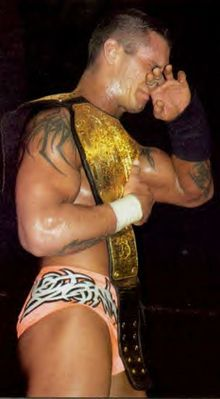
Orton became the youngest World Heavyweight Champion in WWE history at SummerSlam in August 2004.

After losing the Intercontinental Championship, Orton won the World Heavyweight Championship at SummerSlam on August 15 when he defeated Chris Benoit, thus becoming the youngest world champion in WWE history at the age of 24. Benoit congratulated Orton after the match, shaking his hand for showing the ability to "be a man". The following night on Raw, Evolution attacked Orton in the ring, resulting in Orton being kicked out of Evolution. A month later, Orton lost the World Heavyweight Championship to Triple H at Unforgiven on September 12.

The storyline with Evolution continued when he defeated Flair at Taboo Tuesday on October 19 in a fan-voted steel cage match and won four-on-four Survivor Series elimination match at Survivor Series on November 14 where he picked up the win for his team by last eliminating Triple H. He continued to feud with Triple H, using his authority to place his opponents at severe disadvantages during title defenses. He tried to win the World Heavyweight Championship at New Year's Revolution on January 9, 2005 in an Elimination Chamber match and the Royal Rumble on January 30, but both times was defeated by Triple H.

==== Feud with The Undertaker (2005–2006) ====
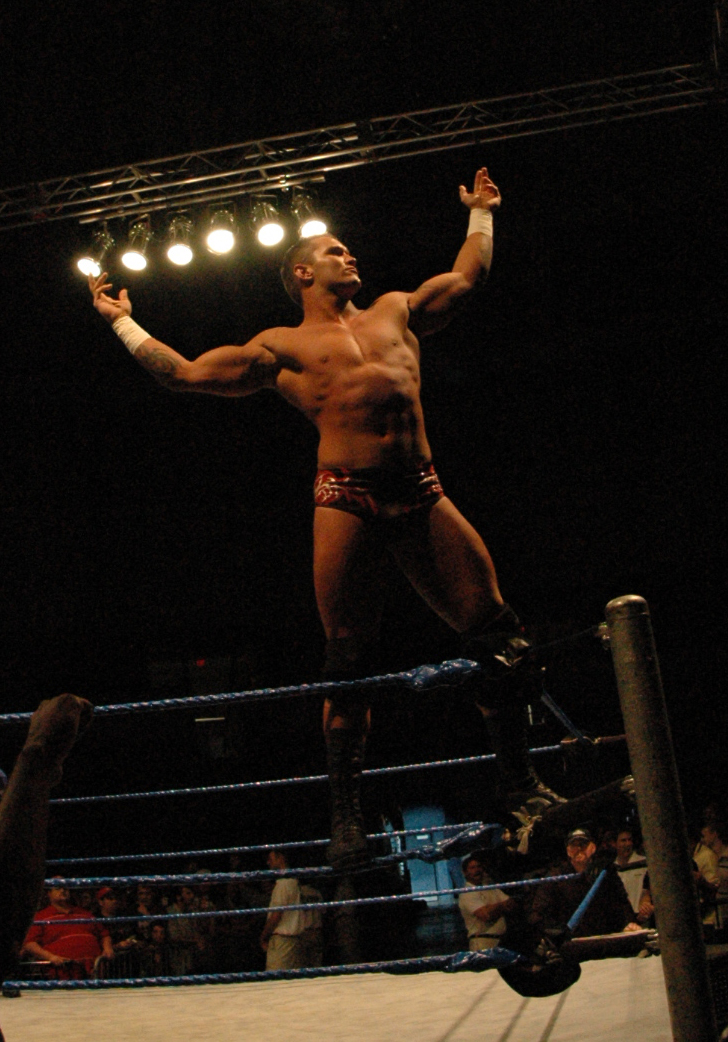
Orton showing off his signature pose in August 2005

Orton began an on-screen relationship with Stacy Keibler, who worked as his manager and started a feud with The Undertaker, trying to ending The Undertaker's undefeated streak at WrestleMania. Orton turned heel after he performed the RKO on Keibler in-turn Orton began being managed by his father, Bob Orton. At WrestleMania 21 on April 3, Orton lost to The Undertaker. WWE offered Orton to end the streak but he refused out of respect to the Undertaker and not believing he was the right person to break it.

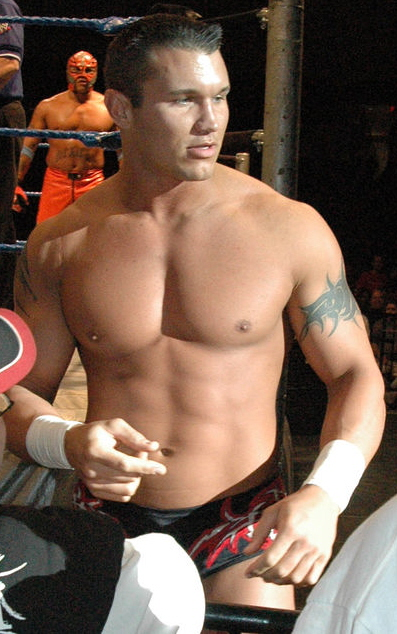
Orton at a WWE house show in 2005

Orton was the second pick in the 2005 draft lottery and rekindled his feud with The Undertaker, defeating him at SummerSlam on August 21 following a distraction from his father. Two months later at No Mercy on October 9, Orton and his father Bob Orton defeated The Undertaker in a handicap casket match and after the match, Randy Orton and his father Bob locked the Undertaker in the casket and set it in fire. At Survivor Series on November 27, after Orton was the last remaining wrestler in the match between Team Raw and Team SmackDown, The Undertaker returned by emerging from a flaming casket and attacked Orton. Their feud culminated with a Hell in a Cell match at Armageddon on December 18, where Orton was defeated.

==== Rated-RKO (2006–2007) ====
Leading to WrestleMania, Orton was the last eliminated from the Royal Rumble by Rey Mysterio. Despite his loss, Orton defeated Mysterio at No Way Out on February 19, earning Mysterio's title shot for the World Heavyweight Championship at WrestleMania. SmackDown! General Manager Theodore Long re-added Mysterio to the WrestleMania title match, making it a triple threat match between Orton, Mysterio and then-champion Kurt Angle; at WrestleMania, Orton lost after he was pinned by Mysterio. On the following episode of SmackDown!, Orton challenged Mysterio for the World Heavyweight Championship, but failed to win the title.

On April 4, Orton was suspended for sixty days for "unprofessional conduct". To cover for the suspension, a scripted injury was devised, where Kurt Angle broke Orton's ankle during a King of the Ring quarterfinal match on the April 14 episode of SmackDown!. Orton returned from his suspension in June to the Raw brand, where he entered a rivalry with Angle, culminating in matches at ECW One Night Stand on June 11 (which he lost) and Vengeance on June 25 (which he won) before engaging in a storyline feud with Hulk Hogan. At SummerSlam on August 20, the two met in a "Legend vs. Legend Killer" match, which Hogan won.

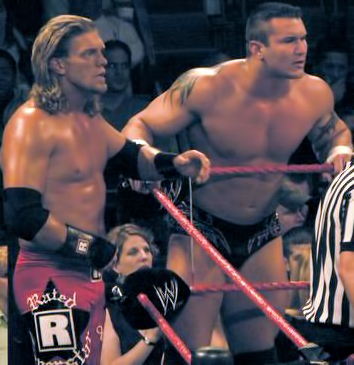
Edge and Orton as Rated-RKO in 2006

At the end of 2006, Orton was paired with Edge as a tag team; Rated-RKO. They feuded with D-Generation X (Triple H and Shawn Michaels) defeating them at Cyber Sunday on November 5. They also won the World Tag Team Championship by defeating Ric Flair and Roddy Piper on the November 13 episode of Raw. The feud with DX ended at New Year's Revolution on January 7, 2007, where Rated-RKO defended the titles, but the match was declared a no-contest when Triple H suffered a legitimate injury during the match. With Triple H out of action, Rated-RKO continued their on-screen rivalry with Michaels. At the Royal Rumble on January 28, both men competed in the Royal Rumble match and made it to the final four, but both were eliminated by Michaels. Michaels later teamed with WWE Champion John Cena to defeat Rated-RKO to win the World Tag Team Championship the following night on Raw. They both competed in the Money in the Bank ladder match at WrestleMania, but the match was won by Mr. Kennedy and participated in a fatal four-way match for the WWE Championship against Cena and Michaels at Backlash on April 29, but Cena retained. Their alliance was effectively ended once Edge joined the SmackDown! brand. Orton then continued his "Legend Killer" persona, attacking Shawn Michaels by using frequent attacks to the head, including an elevated DDT and a running punt to the face. Orton defeated Michaels at Judgment Day on May 20 via knockout when Michaels suffered a kayfabe concussion and collapsed during the match. Orton continued his attacks when he engaged himself in feuds with Rob Van Dam at One Night Stand on June 3 (after losing a stretcher match to Van Dam), Ric Flair, Dusty Rhodes, and Sgt. Slaughter. During this time the commentators noted how Orton slithered around and stalked his victims like a snake; this led to "The Viper" becoming a nickname for Orton.

==== WWE Champion (2007–2008) ====
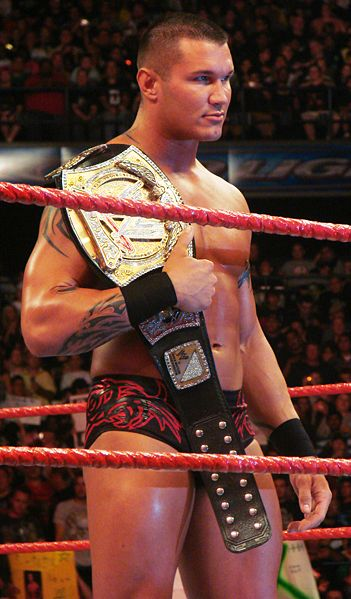
Orton during his first reign as WWE Champion in 2007

Orton challenged John Cena for the WWE Championship at SummerSlam on August 26, but lost. He was granted a rematch by Mr. McMahon after inteferring with Cena's match with King Booker on the August 27 episode of Raw, assaulting Cena before attacking his father at ringside. Orton won his rematch at Unforgiven on September 16 by disqualification when Cena refused to stop punching him in the corner; as titles cannot change hands by disqualification, Cena retained the championship.

Orton was originally booked to face Cena for the WWE Championship again at No Mercy on October 7, but the title was vacated when Cena suffered an injury. At the event, Orton was awarded the championship by Mr. McMahon, but was immediately challenged by Triple H. Orton lost the belt to Triple H in the opening match, but regained it later that night in a Last Man Standing match. Orton then restarted his feud with Shawn Michaels, retaining the title at Cyber Sunday on October 28 and Survivor Series on November 18. In the following months, he retained the title against Chris Jericho at Armageddon on December 16, and Jeff Hardy at the Royal Rumble on January 27, 2008. before restarted his feud with John Cena, who had returned from injury to win the Royal Rumble match. Instead of taking his title shot at WrestleMania XXIV on March 30, Cena took it at No Way Out on February 17 and defeated Orton, who intentionally got himself disqualified by slapping the referee to retain the title. At WrestleMania, Orton retained the WWE Championship against Cena and Triple H, but lost it to Triple H the next month at Backlash on April 27 in a fatal four-way elimination match. After failing to win it back at Judgment Day on May 18 in a steel cage match, he lost against Triple H for the title once more in a Last Man Standing match at One Night Stand on June 1, breaking his collarbone during the match and putting him out of action.

==== The Legacy (2008–2010) ====
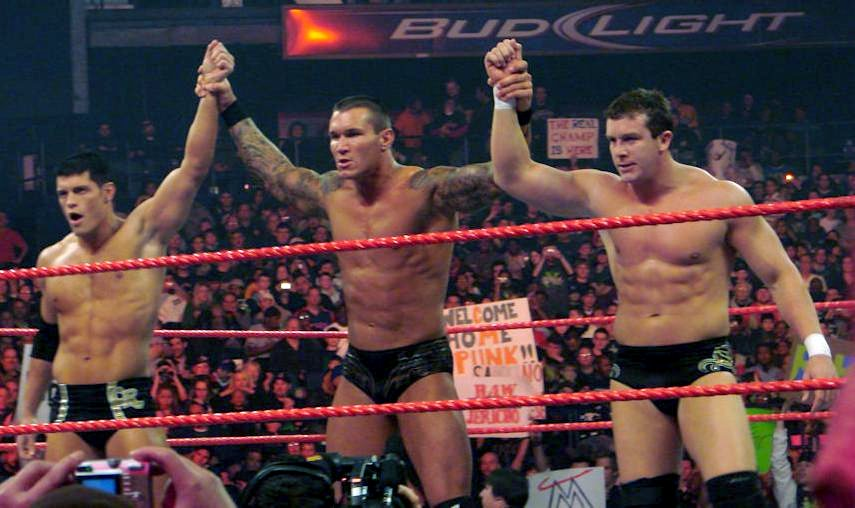
Orton (middle) with Cody Rhodes and Ted DiBiase as part of The Legacy in 2009

Upon being medically cleared to return to the ring, Orton was reinjured in a motorcycle accident. After his return in September, Orton began a stable with second-generation wrestlers and World Tag Team Champions Cody Rhodes and Ted DiBiase, and Manu, creating The Legacy.

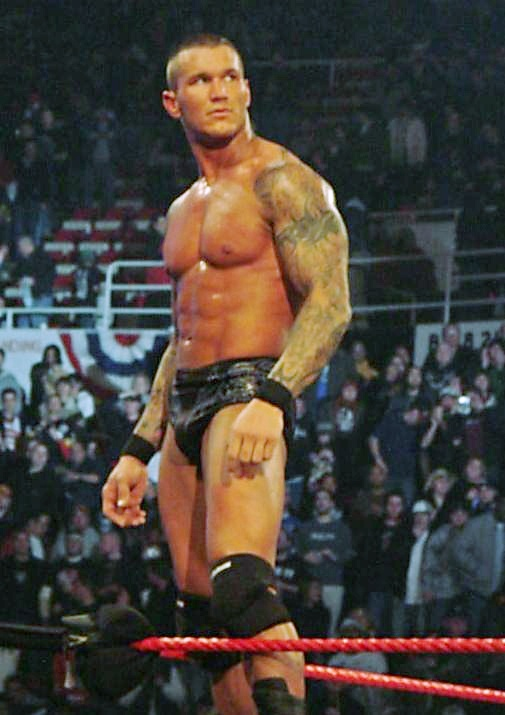
Orton after winning the 2009 Royal Rumble match

Orton began feuding with the McMahon family on the January 19, 2009, episode of Raw when he confronted both Mr. McMahon and Stephanie, ending with Orton performing his running punt kick to Mr. McMahon. At the Royal Rumble on January 25, Orton won the Royal Rumble match, last eliminating Triple H. Heading to WrestleMania, Orton also faced Vince's son Shane McMahon in a No Holds Barred match at No Way Out on February 15, which he won and the next night on Raw in an unsanctioned match, which ended in a no contest when he punted Shane in the head. Despite Orton lost against Triple H for the WWE Championship at WrestleMania 25 on April 5, he won the title at Backlash on April 26 by pinning Triple H in a six-man tag team match between The Legacy and Triple H, Batista and Shane McMahon. At Judgment Day on May 17, Orton retained the championship against Batista, but lost it at Extreme Rules on June 7 in a steel cage match. After the title was vacated, Orton regained it on the June 15 episode of Raw in a fatal four-way match. The following week, Orton defended the WWE Championship against Triple H in a Last Man Standing match, which ended in a no-contest after both men failed to answer the referee's ten count. They faced off for the championship once more at The Bash on June 28 in a Three Stages of Hell match, which Orton won after interference from Legacy. At SummerSlam on August 23, he defended the title against John Cena, during which he used several underhanded tactics to retain the championship. He lost the title to Cena in an "I Quit" match at Breaking Point on September 13, but regained it from Cena in a Hell in a Cell match at Hell in a Cell on October 4. At Bragging Rights on October 25, Orton again lost the championship to Cena in a one-hour Iron Man match to end the feud.

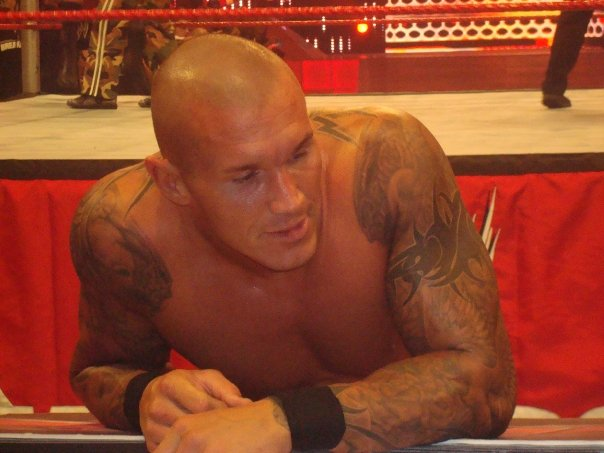
Orton with a shaved head in 2009

Orton then began a rivalry with Kofi Kingston, whom Orton blamed for him losing the WWE Championship due to Kingston interfering in his match with Cena to chase away Rhodes and DiBiase. On the November 16 episode of Raw, Orton and Kingston engaged in a brawl that ended with Kingston putting Orton through a table in the crowd. Both men were named captains for their respective teams at Survivor Series on November 22, where Kingston's team defeated Orton's team after Orton was last eliminated by Kingston. The two traded victories over each on following episodes of Raw, leading to a match at TLC: Tables, Ladders & Chairs on December 13, which Orton won. At Royal Rumble, Orton started a storyine with The Legacy after Rhodes costed him the WWE Championship in a match against Sheamus. Orton lost by disqualification when Rhodes interfered, which prompted Orton to attack both Rhodes and DiBiase after the match. The feud continued in the Elimination Chamber match at Elimination Chamber, where both Orton and DiBiase participated. DiBiase eliminated Orton after hitting him with a pipe Rhodes had given him. A match between the three was booked at WrestleMania XXVI, where Orton defeated Rhodes and DiBiase in a triple threat match.

==== World championship reigns (2010–2013) ====
After The Legacy disbanded, Orton spent most part of the year in World Title feuds. He unsuccessfully challenged Jack Swagger for the World Heavyweight Championship at Extreme Rules on April 25. At Fatal 4-Way on June 20, Orton competed in a fatal four-way WWE Championship match involving champion Cena, Edge, and Sheamus, who won the title after interference from The Nexus. On July 18 at Money in the Bank, Orton competed in a Money in the Bank ladder match for a WWE Championship contract, which was won by The Miz and, at SummerSlam on August 15, he faced the WWE Champion Sheamus in a match that ended in a disqualification, giving Orton the win, but not the title.

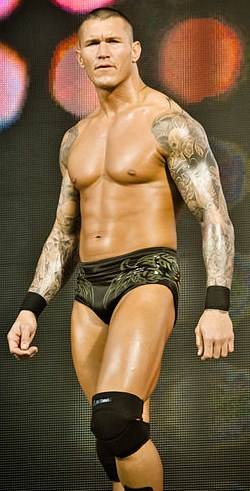
Orton at Tribute to the Troops in December 2010

At Night of Champions on September 19, Orton won the WWE Championship in a six-pack challenge elimination match. After successfully defending the title against Sheamus in a Hell in a Cell match at Hell in a Cell on October 3, he feuded with Wade Barrett, who was blackmailing John Cena to help him capture the title. Orton retained the title against him at Bragging Rights on October 24 and Survivor Series on November 21. However, on the November 22 episode of Raw, after Orton defeated Barrett again in a title match, he lost the championship to The Miz when he cashed his Money in the Bank contract. Orton received his rematch against The Miz in a tables match at TLC: Tables, Ladders & Chairs on December 19 and the Royal Rumble on January 30, 2011, but he lost both matches.

The next month at Elimination Chamber on February 20, Orton failed to win a WWE Championship number one contender Elimination Chamber match after being eliminated by CM Punk. Over the next three weeks, Orton punted and injured all members of The New Nexus, Michael McGillicutty, David Otunga and Mason Ryan. At WrestleMania XXVII on April 3, Orton defeated Punk after a mid-air RKO. Three weeks later in the 2011 WWE draft, Orton was drafted to the SmackDown brand and later beat Punk in a Last Man Standing Match at Extreme Rules on May 1, ending his feud with The New Nexus.

On the May 6 episode of SmackDown, Orton defeated Christian to win the World Heavyweight Championship for the second time. He feuded with Christian over the title, retaining at Over the Limit on May 22 and Capitol Punishment on June 19. Orton lost the title to Christian via disqualification at Money in the Bank on July 17, he won the championship back from Christian in a No Holds Barred match at SummerSlam on August 14. Orton ended his feud with Christian when he retained the World Heavyweight Championship in a steel cage match on the August 30 episode of SmackDown. Orton then lost the title to Mark Henry at Night of Champions on September 18, and failed to regain it two weeks later in a Hell in a Cell match at Hell in a Cell on October 2.

Orton reignited his feud with Wade Barrett after both were named captain for a traditional 5-on-5 Survivor Series elimination match. On the November 11 episode of SmackDown, Orton lost a match to Barrett after Barrett poked Orton in the eye. On the November 14 episode of Raw SuperShow, Orton won a rematch by disqualification after Team Barrett interfered. Orton's team was defeated at Survivor Series on November 20 with Barrett and Cody Rhodes being the sole survivors. Barrett then began attacking and distracting Orton during matches. At TLC: Tables, Ladders, & Chairs on December 18, Orton defeated Barrett in a tables match after he put Barrett through the table with an RKO. Barrett and Orton continued their feud on the December 23 episode of SmackDown, where they brawled backstage and Orton hit Barrett with an RKO onto a car. This led to a Falls Count Anywhere match on the December 30 episode of SmackDown, in which Barrett pushed Orton down a flight of stairs, resulting in a herniated disc, which sidelined Orton for four weeks. On the January 27, 2012, episode of SmackDown, he returned to the ring and attacked Barrett. On the February 3 episode of SmackDown, Orton defeated Barrett in a No Disqualification match to end the feud.

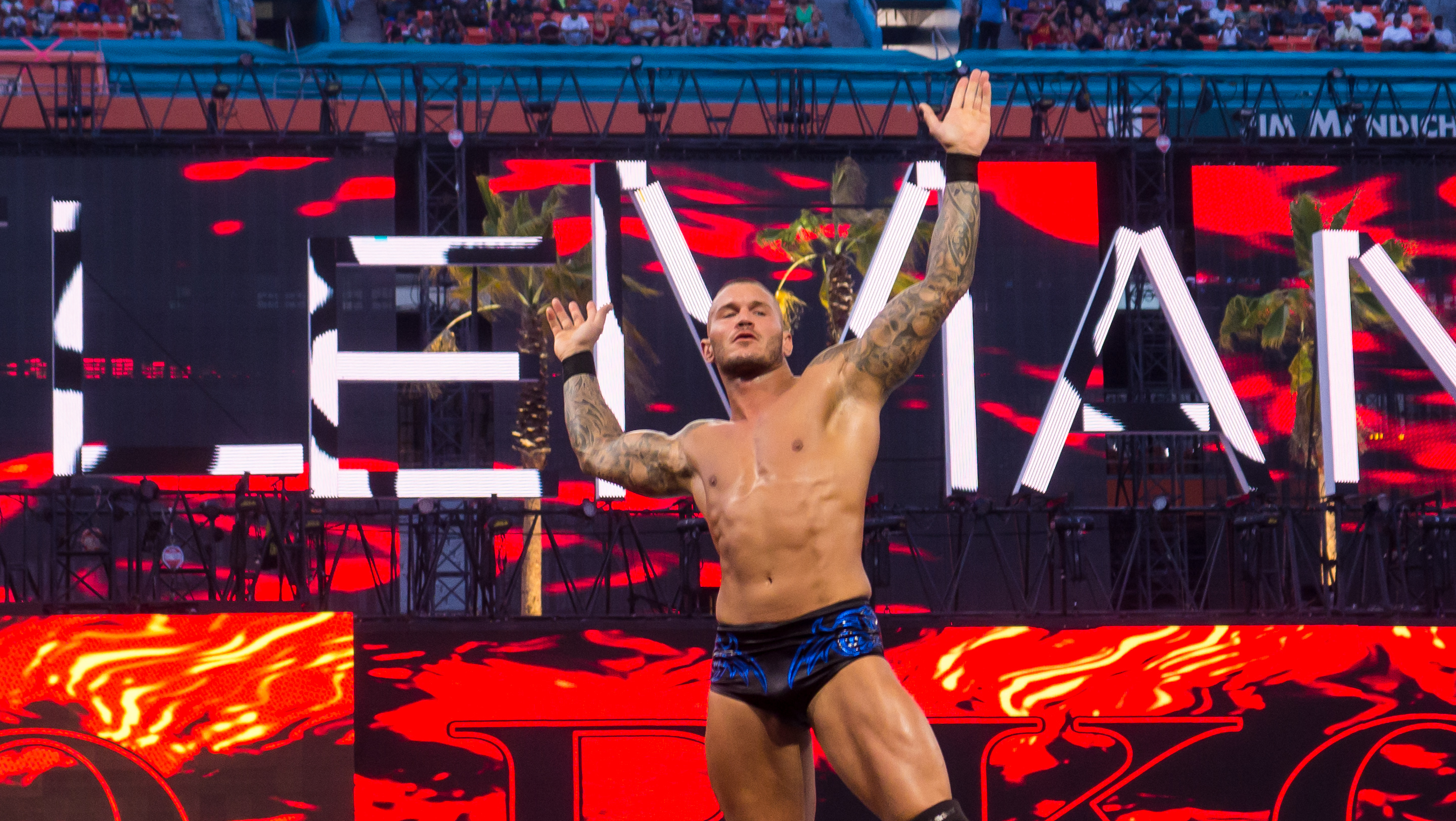
Orton at WrestleMania XXVIII

In 2012, Orton feuded with Kane and was defeated by him at WrestleMania XXVIII on April 1. Orton defeated Kane on the next SmackDown in a No Disqualification rematch and at Extreme Rules on April 29 in a Falls Count Anywhere match. On May 30, WWE suspended Orton for 60 days due to his second violation of the company's Talent Wellness Program.

Orton returned on the July 30 episode of Raw defeating Heath Slater. Orton began feuding with Mr. Money in the Bank Dolph Ziggler and defeated Ziggler at Night of Champions on September 16. He began feuding with Alberto Del Rio on the September 28 episode of SmackDown. Orton defeated Del Rio at Hell in a Cell on October 28 in a singles match and represented Team Foley as his team lost to Team Ziggler at Survivor Series on November 18 in a traditional five-on-five elimination tag match.

On the December 3 episode of Raw, Orton began a feud with The Shield, facing them at WrestleMania 29 on April 7, 2013 and Payback on June 16.

==== The Authority (2013–2015) ====
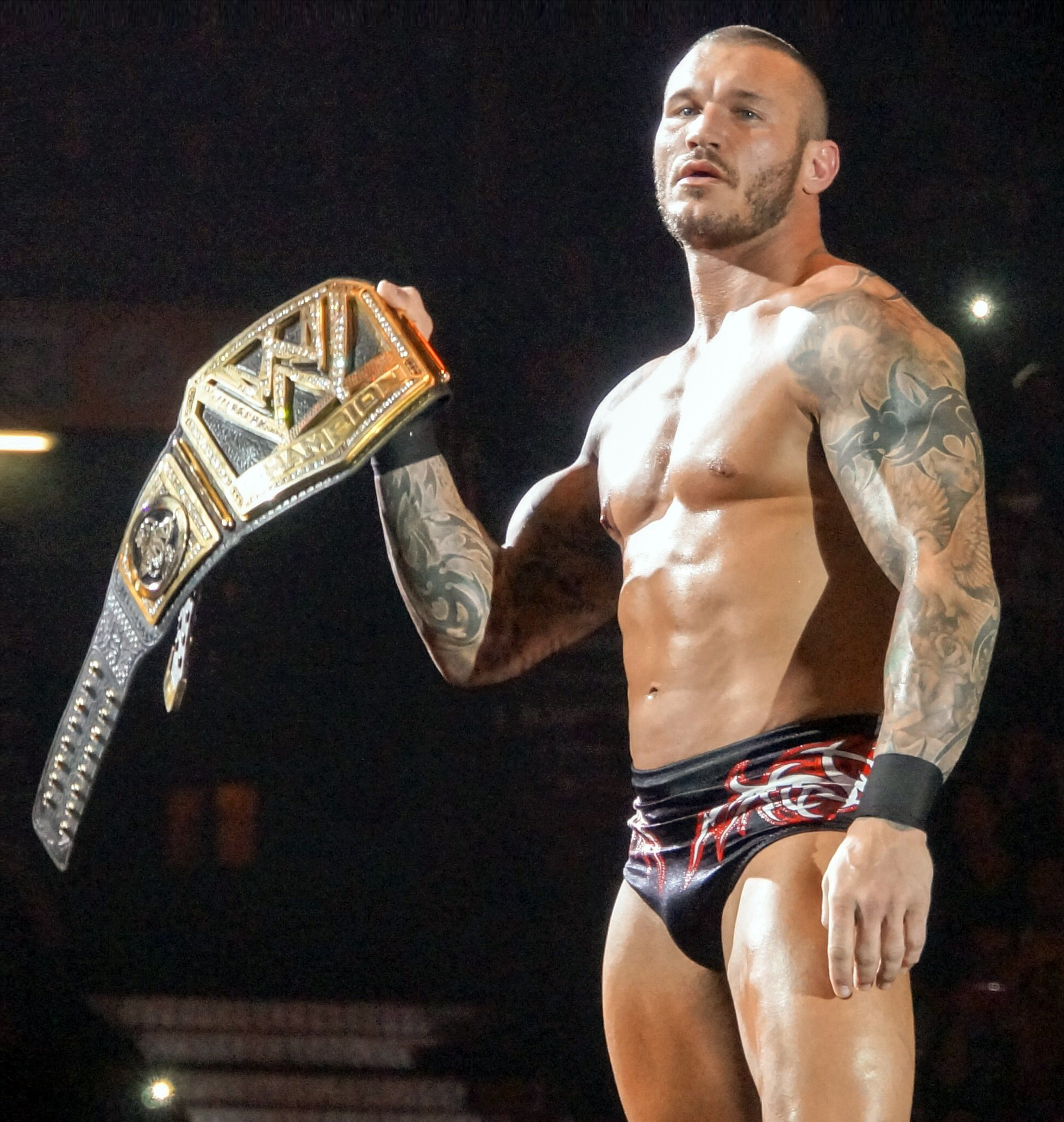
Orton as WWE Champion in November 2013

On July 14 at Money in the Bank, Orton won the WWE Championship Money in the Bank ladder match, and cashed in his title opportunity at SummerSlam on August 18, winning the title from Daniel Bryan, turning heel for the first time since 2010. Orton joined the stable The Authority with Triple H and Stephanie McMahon. On September 15 at Night of Champions, Orton lost the WWE Championship back to Bryan, but regained at Hell in a Cell on October 27. On November 24 at Survivor Series, after retaining the title against Big Show, Orton was confronted by World Heavyweight Champion and long-time rival John Cena. Orton and Cena face each other at TLC: Tables, Ladders & Chairs on December 15 in a Tables, Ladders and Chairs match to unify Cena's World Heavyweight Championship and Orton's WWE Championship into one title, with Orton becoming the first WWE World Heavyweight Champion as well as officially being recognized as the final World Heavyweight Champion. Orton retained the title at the Royal Rumble on January 26, 2014, against Cena and at Elimination Chamber on February 23 in an Elimination Chamber match against Daniel Bryan, John Cena, Cesaro, Christian and Sheamus. At WrestleMania XXX on April 6, Orton lost the title to Daniel Bryan in a Triple Threat match that also included Batista.

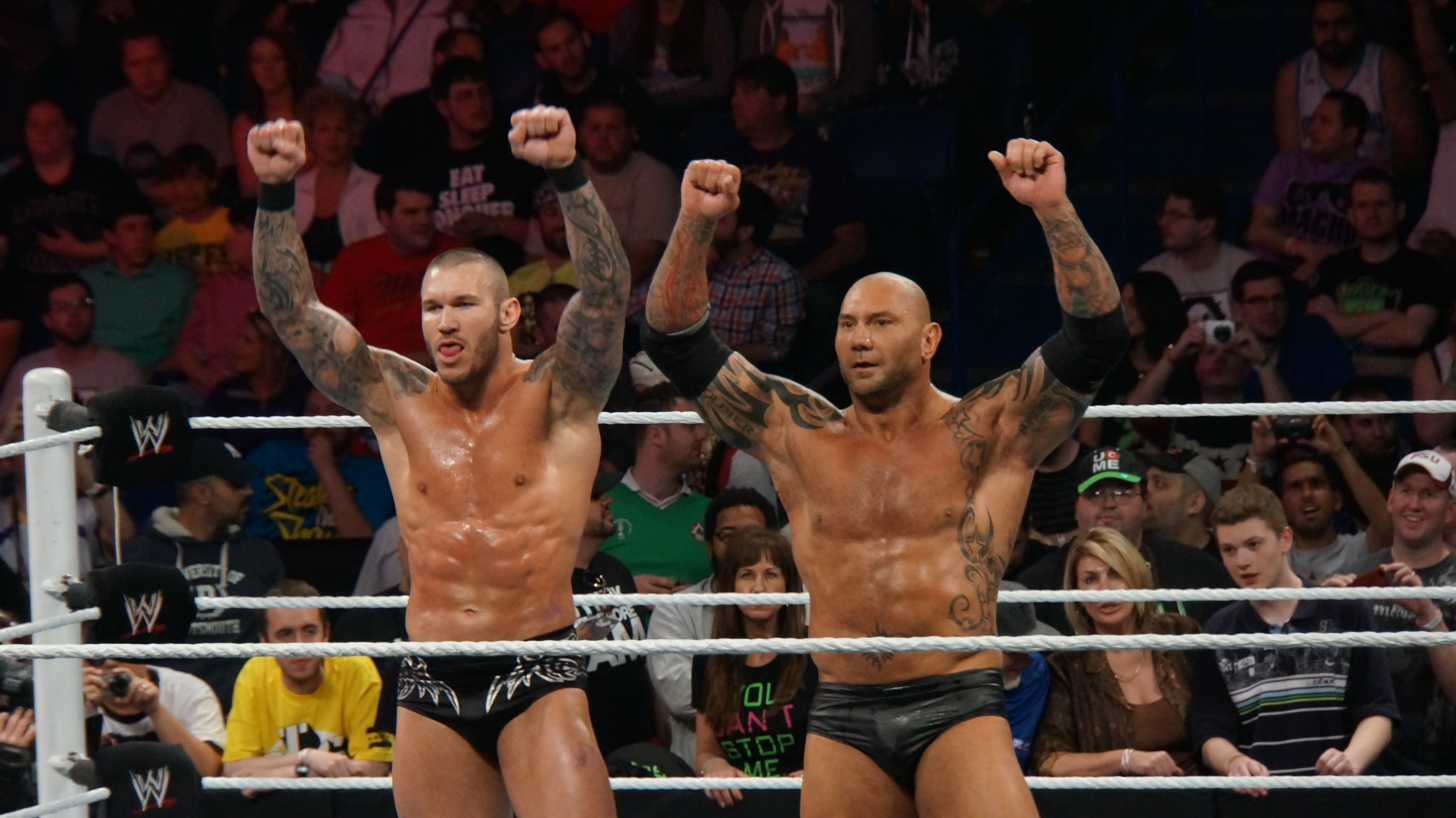
Orton (left) and Batista in April 2014

After losing the title, Orton joined Triple H and Batista to reform Evolution, feuding with The Shield. Evolution lost all matches against The Shield at Extreme Rules on May 4 and Payback on June 1. At SummerSlam on August 17, he was defeated by Shield's member Roman Reigns.

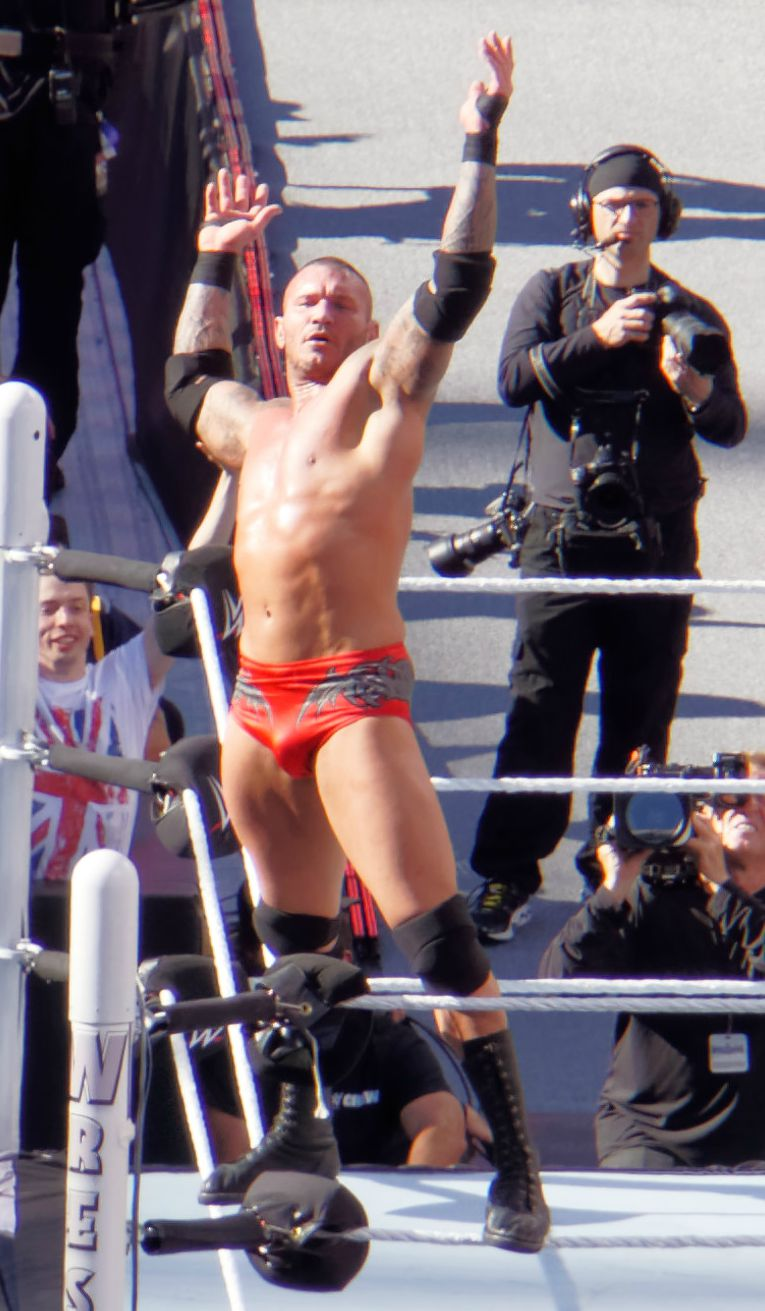
Orton doing his signature pose after defeating Seth Rollins at WrestleMania 31 in March 2015

Then on the October 27 episode of Raw, Orton feuded with Seth Rollins, who joined the Authority, turning face in the process. On the November 3 episode of Raw, after Rollins performed a Curb Stomp onto the steel steps on Orton, he was kicked from the Authority.

After a three-month hiatus, Orton returned at Fastlane on February 22, 2015 and defeated Rollins at WrestleMania 31 on March 29. After WrestleMania, with Rollins as the new WWE World Heavyweight Champion, Orton faced Rollins in a steel cage match at Extreme Rules on April 26 and Payback on May 17, losing both title matches.

At Money in the Bank on June 14, Orton failed to win the championship contract ladder match, which was won by Sheamus. Following this, Orton began feuding with Sheamus after both men attacked each other and faced off in various tag-team matches; Orton defeated Sheamus at Battleground on July 19, but lost to Sheamus at SummerSlam on August 23. On the September 7 episode of Raw, Orton was attacked by The Wyatt Family, starting a feud that was booked to end in the Hell in a Cell pre-show on October 25, but canceled after Orton suffered a legitimate shoulder injury, putting him out of action for the following months.

==== The Wyatt Family (2016–2017) ====
On the July 7, 2016, episode of SmackDown, Orton was revealed as Brock Lesnar's opponent for SummerSlam on August 21. On July 19 at the 2016 WWE draft, Orton was drafted to SmackDown, while Lesnar was drafted to Raw. At SummerSlam, Lesnar defeated Orton by technical knockout after a series of legit elbows to the head, leaving Orton with an open wound that required 10 staples. The elbows caused a concussion who prevented Orton from wrestling.

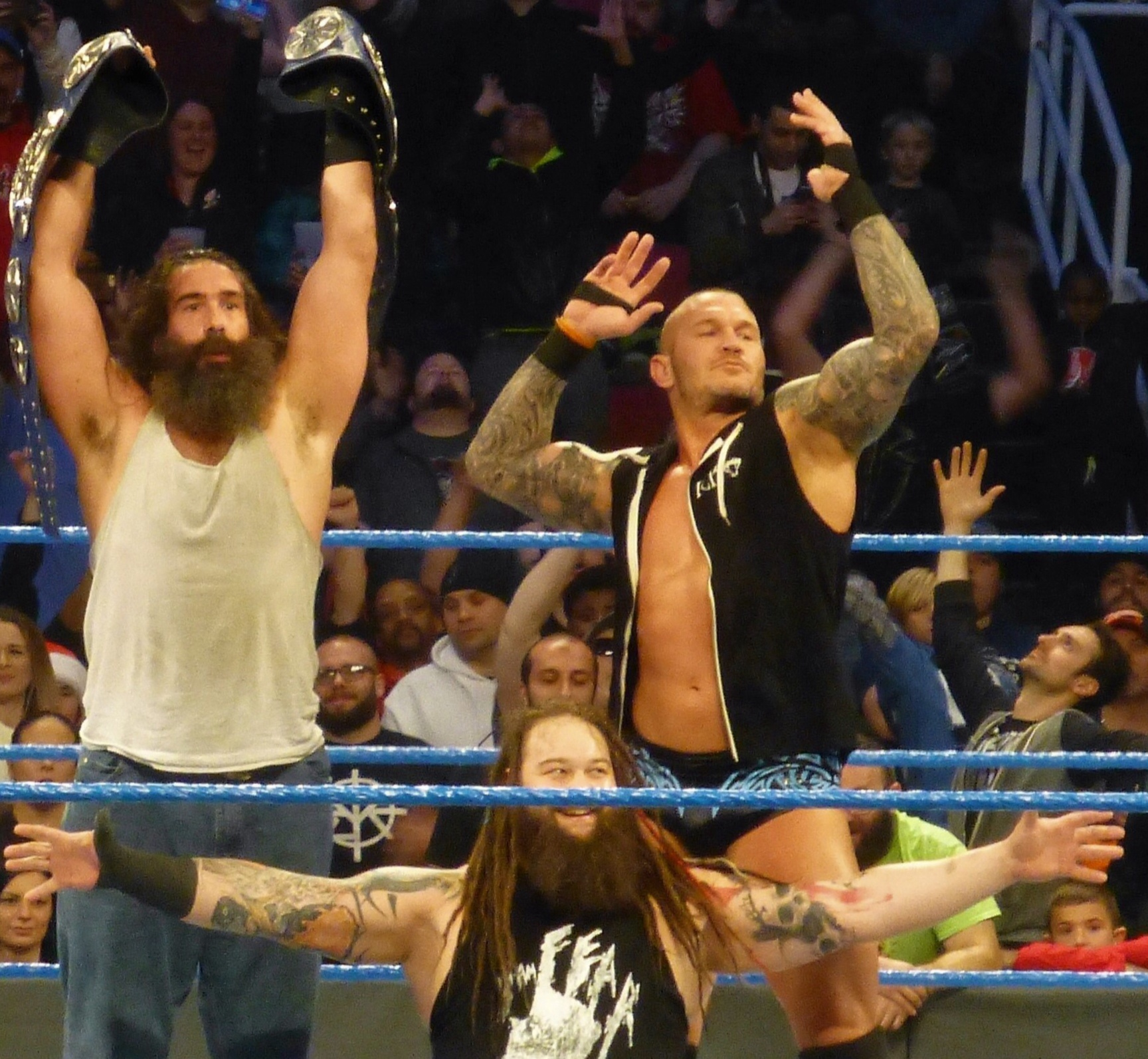
Orton with Luke Harper and Bray Wyatt as one-third of the SmackDown Tag Team Champions in 2016

After his match with Lesnar, Orton resumed his feud with Bray Wyatt, facing him No Mercy on October 9, where he lost. However, Orton turned heel and joined Wyatt's stable, The Wyatt Family.

The stable won the SmackDown Tag Team Championship from Heath Slater and Rhyno at TLC: Tables, Ladders & Chairs on December 4 (Orton, Wyatt and Luke Harper held the titles under the Freebird Rule), but lost it weeks later on the December 27 episode of SmackDown Live to American Alpha. On January 29, 2017, Orton won the Royal Rumble for the second time in his career while Wyatt won the WWE Championship at Elimination Chamber on February 12. Orton started a storyline where he relinquished his shot at the title, but turned face again by betraying Wyatt. At WrestleMania 33 on April 2, Orton defeated Wyatt to win the WWE Championship for the ninth time. On the following episode of SmackDown Live, Wyatt challenged Orton to a "House of Horrors" rematch, but after Wyatt was moved to the Raw brand as a result of the Superstar Shake-up, it was made a non-title match and scheduled for Raw's Payback on April 30, which he lost.

Orton lost the title to Jinder Mahal at Backlash on May 21, and failed to regain it at Money in the Bank on June 18 and Battleground on July 23 in a Punjabi Prison match.

==== United States Champion (2017–2018) ====
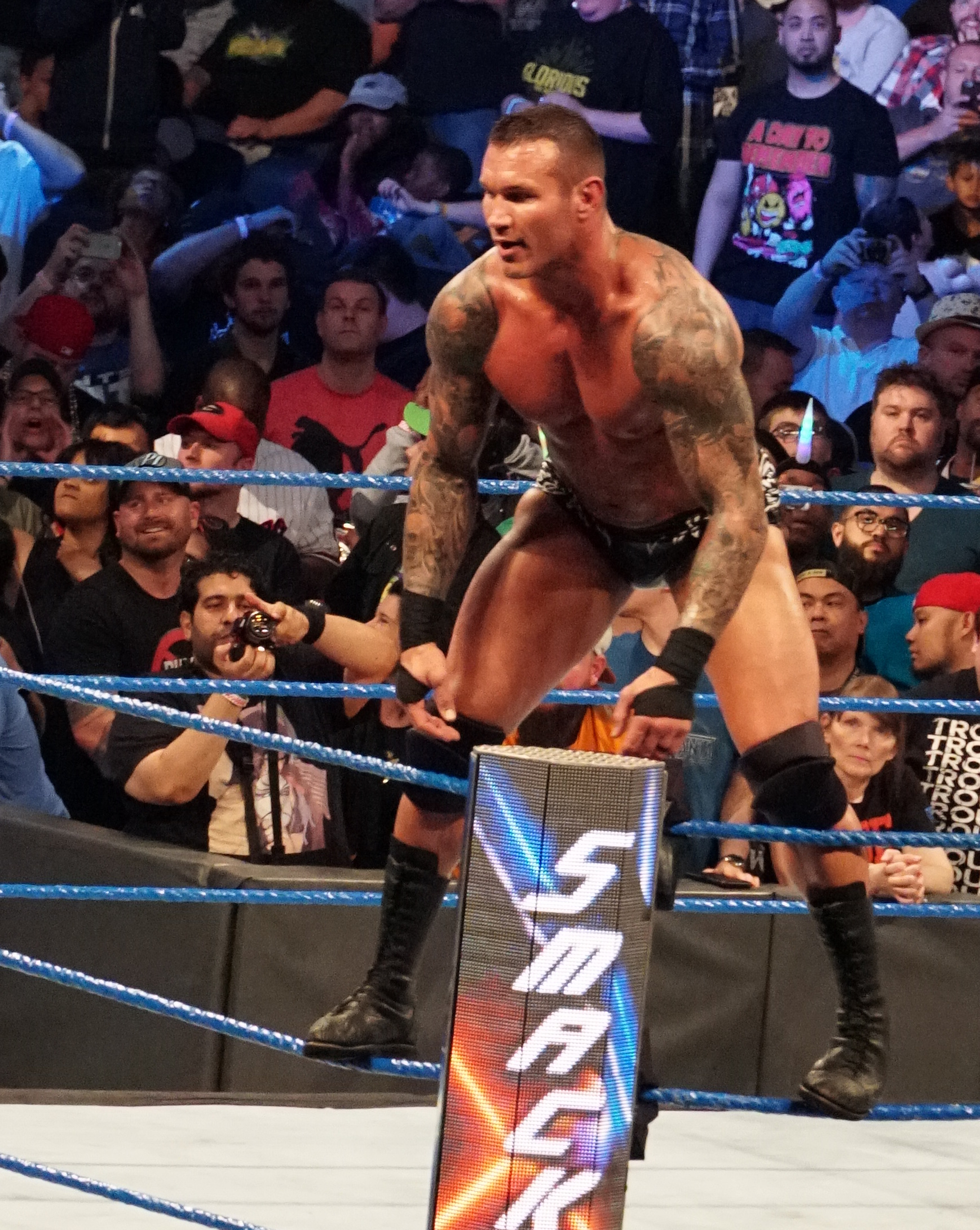
Orton in 2018

Orton started a feud with Rusev, whom he defeated in 10 seconds at SummerSlam on August 20. On the September 19 episode of SmackDown Live, Orton was defeated by Rusev in 10 seconds after a distraction from Aiden English. At Hell in a Cell on October 8, Orton defeated Rusev to end the feud. Orton also worked on the Survivor Series on November 19 as part of the traditional Survivor Series match and the Royal Rumble on January 28, 2018, but he lost both matches. At Fastlane on March 11, Orton defeated Bobby Roode to win the WWE United States Championship, thus becoming the 18th Grand Slam Champion) but lost it at WrestleMania 34 on April 8 against Jinder Mahal in a fatal four-way match. He had another title match at Backlash on May 6 against the new champion Jeff Hardy, but Orton lost again. On May 18, WWE confirmed that Orton had undergone successful surgery to repair a medial meniscus tear in his left knee, sidelining him indefinitely.

==== Return of the Legend Killer (2018–2021) ====
Orton returned at Extreme Rules and attacked Jeff Hardy, turning heel. He defeated Hardy at Hell in a Cell. Orton defeated a returning Big Show to qualify for the WWE World Cup at Crown Jewel, but at Crown Jewel lost to Rey Mysterio in the first round. This sparked a feud between the pair, with Orton stealing Mysterio's mask on the November 21 episode of SmackDown Live before losing to Mysterio in a chairs match at TLC. Orton attempted to re-enter the world championship scene in the new year, but lost in both the Royal Rumble and Elimination Chamber. At WrestleMania 35, Orton lost to AJ Styles.

In July, Orton feuded with Kingston over the WWE Championship, unsuccessfully challenging at both SummerSlam and Clash of Champions. Orton was drafted to Raw as part of the 2019 WWE draft, and restarted his feud with a now-heel Styles, thus turning Orton face. They fought multiple times throughout December and January.

At the Royal Rumble on January 26, 2020, Orton entered the titular match at number 25 and eliminated Karl Anderson before he was eliminated by his former Rated-RKO tag team partner Edge, who had returned to competition for the first time since retiring in 2011 due to career-ending neck injuries. The next night on Raw, Orton teased a Rated-RKO reunion with Edge before delivering an RKO and a con-chair-to, turning heel once again. Orton and Edge then began a feud, facing each other in a Last Man Standing match at WrestleMania 36, which Orton lost. Their second match at Backlash, billed as the "Greatest Wrestling Match Ever", was won by Orton. The match put Edge out of action with a legitimate torn triceps, and the victory enabled Orton to call himself the "Greatest Wrestler Ever". The following night on Raw, Edge's friend and former tag team partner Christian challenged Orton to an unsanctioned match, which Orton won with assistance from Ric Flair. Orton revived his Legend Killer gimmick over the next few weeks, attacking legends such as Christian, Shawn Michaels, and Big Show. Orton then turned on Flair and set his sights on the WWE Championship. He lost twice to then-champion Drew McIntyre at SummerSlam and Clash of Champions, but winning the championship from McIntyre at Hell In A Cell. before quickly losing it back to McIntyre on the November 16 episode of Raw.

Three weeks after his title loss, Orton started a feud with Bray Wyatt, now under his new gimmick, The Fiend, and Alexa Bliss. After defeating The Fiend in a Firefly Inferno match at TLC: Tables, Ladders & Chairs on December 20, Orton continued to battle with both them and Edge until April 11, defeating The Fiend at WrestleMania 37 after Bliss turned on the Fiend.

==== RK-Bro (2021–2022) ====
After WrestleMania, Orton teamed with Riddle to form RK-Bro, turning face in the process. They defeated AJ Styles and Omos at SummerSlam to become the Raw Tag Team Champions, defeating the pair again at Crown Jewel and defeating the SmackDown Tag Team Champions The Usos at Survivor Series. With this match, Orton broke Kane's record for wrestling the most PPV matches in WWE history. RK-Bro briefly lost their championship to Alpha Academy in early 2022 but regained it on the March 7 edition of Raw, and at WrestleMania 38, successfully defended it against Alpha Academy and the Street Profits in a triple threat tag team match. However, on the May 20 episode of SmackDown they lost a title vs title match to The Usos where both the Raw and SmackDown Tag Team Championships were on the line. A few days later, it was announced that Orton had suffered a legitimate back injury and was expected to be on hiatus for the rest of 2022. During his hiatus in September 2023, Riddle was released from WWE, effectively ending RK-Bro.

==== Various feuds and championship pursuits (2023–present) ====
After an 18-month hiatus, Orton returned at Survivor Series: WarGames on November 25 as the fifth member of Cody Rhodes' team in the traditional WarGames match, helping him defeat Drew McIntyre and The Judgment Day. On the December 1 episode of SmackDown, he signed with the SmackDown brand, and began to feud with The Bloodline, culminating in an unsuccessful challenge against Roman Reigns for the Undisputed WWE Universal Championship at the 2024 Royal Rumble in a fatal four-way match also involving AJ Styles and LA Knight.

During Spring Orton competed in the year's Elimination Chamber match, losing to Drew McIntyre. He challenged Logan Paul for the United States Championship in a triple threat match alongside Kevin Owens at WrestleMania XL, but lost after Paul pinned Owens to retain. His feud reignited with The Bloodline after he saved Owens from Solo Sikoa and Tama Tonga, but he and Owens were unable to beat the pair in a tag team match at Backlash after interference from Tanga Loa.

After Backlash, Orton participated in the King of the Ring tournament, making it to the finals where he lost to Gunther in the finals at King and Queen of the Ring in controversial fashion as Orton's shoulder was not fully on the mat when the referee counted the pin. After losing at Money in the Bank in a six-man tag team match to the Bloodline, on the August 5 episode of Raw, Orton challenged Gunther to a rematch for the World Heavyweight Championship, citing the controversy over the finish. The match was made official for Bash in Berlin on August 31, where Gunther defeated Orton once more. Later in the year, Owens, having turned heel at Bad Blood, attacked Orton in the parking lot during the October 11 episode of SmackDown. Owens (kayfabe) injured Orton with a package piledriver on the November 8 episode of SmackDown, writing Orton off the show until the Elimination Chamber in March 2025.

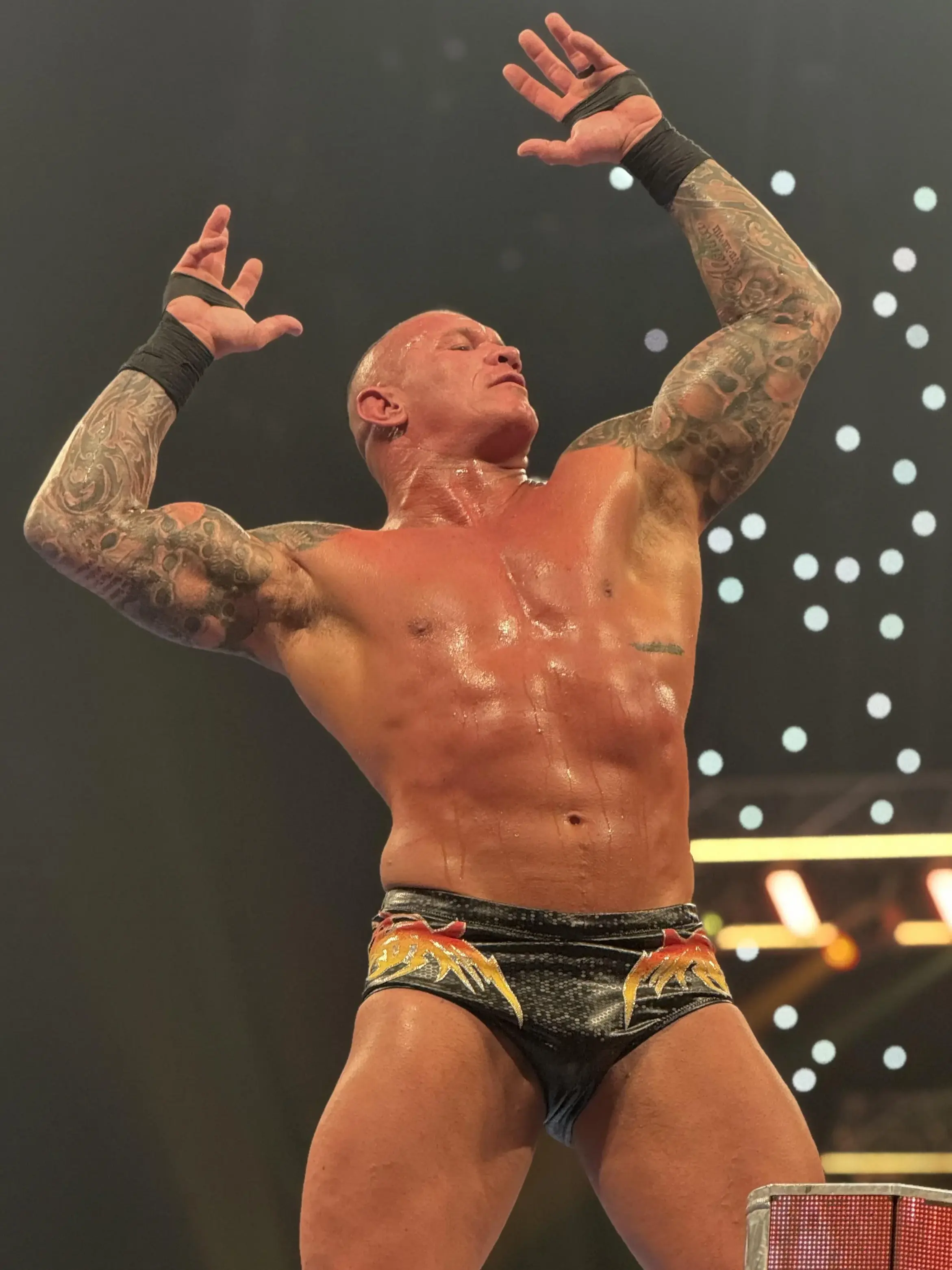
Orton in June 2025

At Night 2 of WrestleMania 41, Orton, originally scheduled to face Owens before he was legitimately injured, issued an open challenge to the roster. This was answered by TNA World Champion Joe Hendry, whom Orton quickly defeated. The following night on Raw, Orton attacked the now-villainous newly crowned Undisputed WWE Champion John Cena with an RKO, reigniting their storied rivalry, unsuccessfully challenging Cena for his title at Backlash after interference by R-Truth in their final match against each other. Orton participated in the 2025 King of the Ring tournament as part of the SmackDown brand, reaching the finals for the second year in a row. However he again lost, getting pinned by Cody Rhodes at Night of Champions. Orton then feuded with Logan Paul and McIntyre for the summer, assisted by singer Jelly Roll, culinating with a loss to the pair on Night 1 of SummerSlam on August 2.

At the Royal Rumble on January 31, 2026, Orton entered the match at #29 for a chance of a world title bout at WrestleMania 42 but finished in third place after being eliminated by Gunther. At Elimination Chamber on February 28, Orton won the namesake match for the second time in his career, earning an Undisputed WWE Championship match at WrestleMania 42. On the March 13 episode of SmackDown, Orton attacked the newly-crowned Undisputed WWE Champion Cody Rhodes during the contract signing segment, turning heel for the first time since 2021. On Night 1 of WrestleMania 42, Orton was unsuccessful in winning the title.

After a three-month hiatus at Night 1 of SummerSlam on August 1, Orton made his return, costing Rhodes his Undisputed WWE Championship match against CM Punk. At Sunday Night's Main Event on September 6, in a WrestleMania rematch Orton defeated Rhodes. The pair fought again at Crown Jewel in a Last Man Standing match, where Orton lost once more.

== Professional wrestling style and persona ==
=== In ring style ===
Orton's most notable move is his finishing maneuver, the RKO, a jumping variation of a cutter. The name is a pun on his initials (Randal Keith Orton) with "Randy-KO". He also previously used a punt kick, which saw him run up to an opponent on their hands and knees and kick them in the head; within a storyline, this usually caused a concussion or some other sort of severe head injury to his opponent, and was often used to write off the on-screen characters of wrestlers who were scheduled to take time off. However, the move was legitimately banned by WWE management in 2012 due to the ease of imitation by viewers and the risk of injury should the move be botched. The move was brought back in June 2020 as part of the feud between Orton and Edge where Orton used the Punt Kick to defeat Edge at Backlash. Orton began to use the move regularly again.

During his initial years in WWE, Orton's gimmick was that of "the Legend Killer", a young and cocky talent who disrespected and usually defeated several legends. In late 2007, in the midst of his second WWE Championship reign, his character changed to a more unstable and treacherous personality. He then adopted the nicknames of "the Viper" and "the Apex Predator" due to his untrustworthy, snake-like character. He has said numerous times that he prefers playing the villain, as it is easier and more natural for him. In January 2008, Orton told 411Mania: "It's easy for me to go out there and be a prick on the show because it's me times ten. And even though you probably don't like me anyway, give me five minutes and I'll make you not like me more. Being a heel is fun. It comes so natural."

=== Fashion and appearance ===
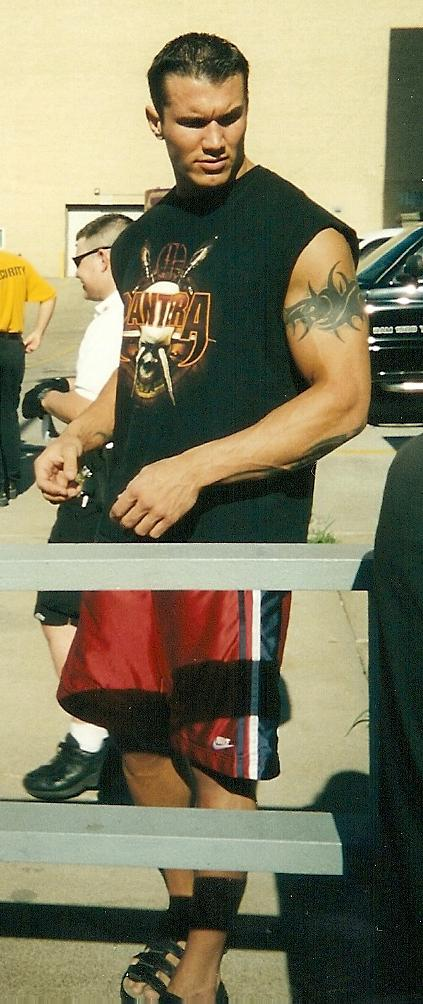
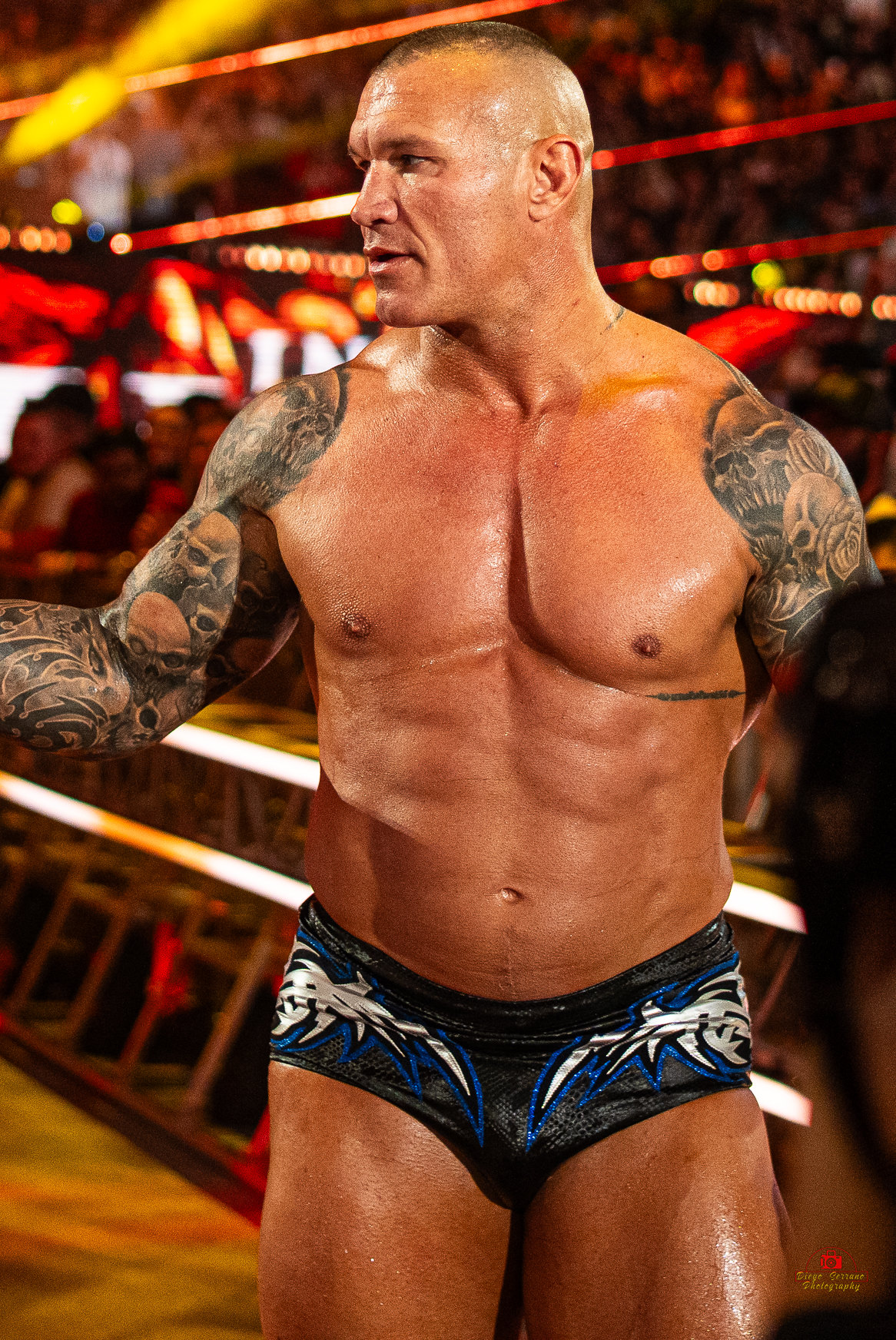
Randy Orton’s evolution from 2003 to 2024

Throughout his career Orton's in ring gear has mostly stayed the same, usually consisting of a typical pair of wrestling trunks, knee pads and wrist bands. During his entrances he often wears a sleeveless jacket with his signature viper logo on the back. He has kept his hair length relatively short throughout his tenure however during his run in 2009 he made the decision to shave his head bald, to give himself a more menacing look. Another big part of Orton's look are his tattoos, which he has multiple of. He got his first major tattoo during his OVW days, which was his iconic tribal barbed wire piece on his back. Later on he got sleeve tattoos on both of his arms that he debuted in 2008, which consists of skeletons, a bible quote and references to his family. He also has one additional matching tattoo on his stomach which his wife also has.

== Acting career ==
A former Marine, Orton was set to star in the action film The Marine 2 (2009), but was replaced by Ted DiBiase Jr. after injuring his collarbone. He had a supporting role as the father of a school bully in the comedy-drama film That's What I Am (2011). He signed on to star in the action film The Marine 3: Homefront (2013), but was replaced by The Miz due to his checkered military career. He later starred in the action films 12 Rounds 2: Reloaded (2013) and The Condemned 2 (2015). He had a guest role as James Richards, a former Navy SEAL and leader of a militia group, in a December 2016 episode of the USA action series Shooter. He also had a supporting role in the comedy-drama film Changeland (2019).

== Other media ==
In 2004, Orton appeared on the talk show Jimmy Kimmel Live! to promote Taboo Tuesday. In March 2007, he appeared alongside Edge, John Cena and Bobby Lashley on the game show Deal or No Deal. He was the cover athlete for the video game WWE '12.

In October 2014, he became a popular figure on Vine and the internet, when a trend began of clips of a superimposed Orton performing his signature RKO move on internet "fail" victims.

In 2024, rapper Eladio Carrión made a song titled “RKO” in reference to Orton's signature move; Orton made a cameo in the song's official music video. On August 24, Orton threw out the ceremonial first pitch at a St. Louis Cardinals game.

== Personal life ==
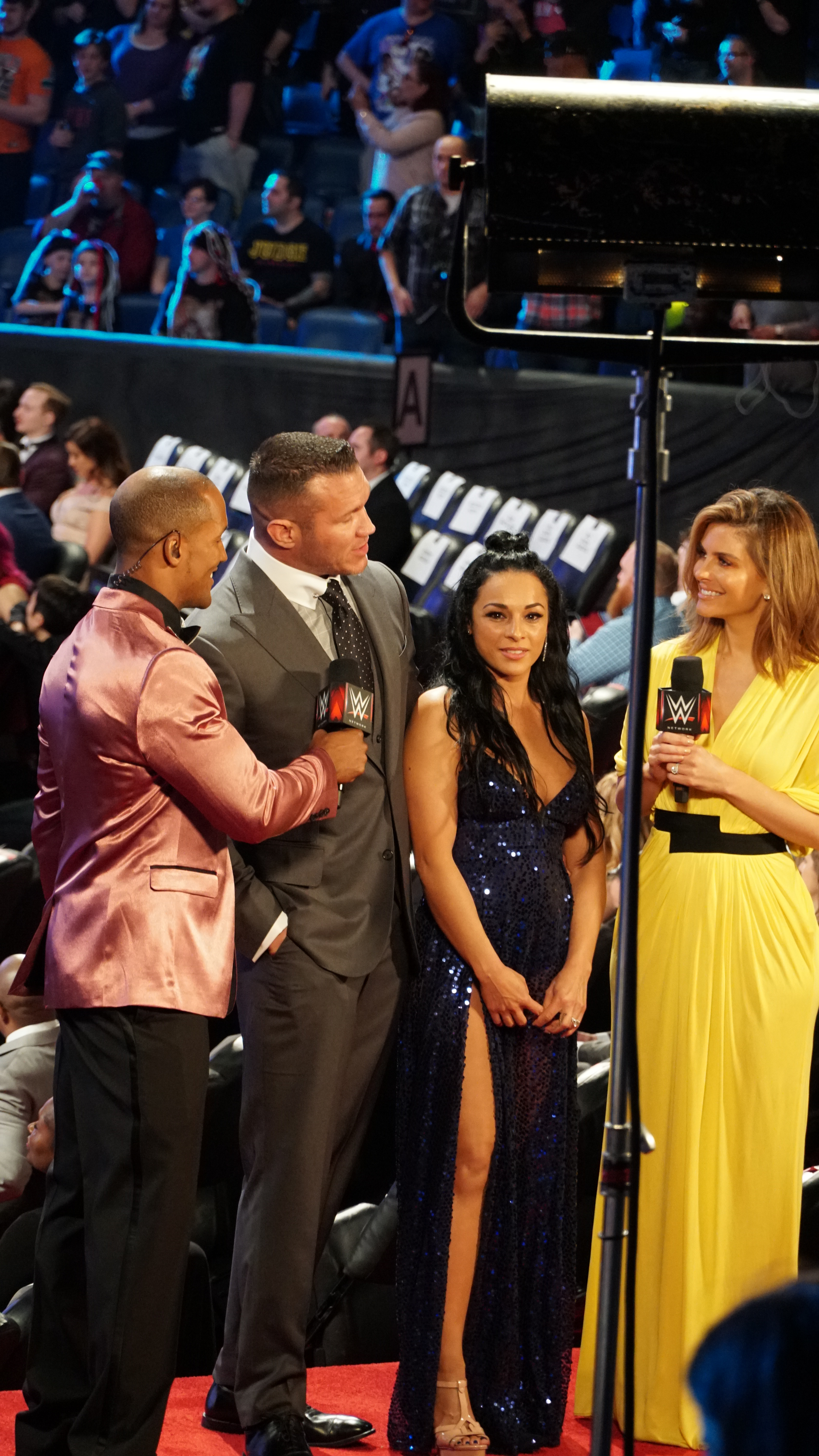
Orton and Kessler at the 2018 WWE Hall of Fame ceremony

Orton married Samantha Speno on September 21, 2007, and they had a daughter together before separating in late 2012 and divorcing in June 2013. Orton married Kimberly Kessler, who was previously a member of his fan club, on November 14, 2015. They have a daughter together, who is Orton's second child and Kessler's fourth, and he is also the step-father of Kessler's three sons from her previous marriage. They reside in St. Charles, Missouri. In 2020 he and his wife started a clothing brand called Slthr. Orton enjoys playing video games in his spare time. Orton's musical interest spans from rap to heavy metal and rock.

Orton suffers from hypermobility in both of his shoulders, which has been the cause of nearly all of his most notable injuries throughout his career, sidelining him through incidents ranging from performing one of his signature taunts during a match to innocuous things such as taking out the trash at home.

== Controversies and legal issues ==
In March 2007, Sports Illustrated posted an article on its website as part of its continuing series investigating a steroid and growth hormone ring used by a number of professional athletes in several sports. The article mentioned several current and former WWE wrestlers, including Orton, who was alleged to have obtained nandrolone, oxandrolone, stanozolol, and testosterone, as well as ancillary drugs anastrozole and clomiphene citrate. WWE simply claimed that the allegations preceded their Talent Wellness Program, launched in February 2006.

In August 2018, Orton was investigated by WWE for sexual harassment when it was claimed that he had exposed himself to new members of the company's writing staff during his early career, though nothing came of the investigation.

Also in 2018, Orton's tattoo artist Catherine Alexander filed a lawsuit against Take-Two Interactive and 2K Games for their unapproved use of her copyrighted tattoos on his likeness in their WWE 2K video game series. She argued that the copying of the tattoos infringed on her rights as the licensed creator. Take-Two argued fair use; since there was a material dispute on that question the judge denied the company's motion for summary judgement while granting Alexander's motion for the same on the copying issue, leaving fair use the only issue to try. A trial was scheduled for September 2021, but was postponed due to the COVID-19 pandemic. The trial went ahead in October 2022, with the judge ruling in favor of Alexander and declaring that she was entitled to $3,750 in damages.

== Filmography ==
=== Film ===
Year	Title	Role	Notes
2011	That's What I Am	Ed Freel	
2013	12 Rounds 2: Reloaded	Nick Malloy	
2015	The Condemned 2	Will Tanner	
2016	Countdown	Himself	
2019	Changeland	Martin	

=== Television ===
Year	Title	Role	Notes
2004	Jimmy Kimmel Live!	Himself	
2007	Deal or No Deal	Himself	
2010	Lopez Tonight	Himself	
2016	Shooter	James Richards	Episode: "Recon by Fire"

=== Music videos ===
Year	Artist	Song	Role
2024	Eladio Carrión	"RKO"	Himself

=== Video games ===
WWE Video Games
Year	Title	Role
2002	WWE SmackDown! Shut Your Mouth	Video game debut
2003	WWE WrestleMania XIX	
2003	WWE Raw 2	
2003	WWE SmackDown! Here Comes the Pain	
2004	WWE Day of Reckoning	Cover athlete
2004	WWE Survivor Series	Cover athlete
2004	WWE Smackdown! vs. Raw	
2005	WWE WrestleMania 21	
2005	WWE Day of Reckoning 2	
2005	WWE SmackDown! vs. Raw 2006	
2006	WWE SmackDown vs. Raw 2007	
2007	WWE SmackDown vs. Raw 2008	
2008	WWE SmackDown vs. Raw 2009	
2009	WWE SmackDown vs. Raw 2010	Cover athlete
2010	WWE SmackDown vs. Raw 2011	
2011	WWE All Stars	Cover athlete
2011	WWE '12	Cover athlete
2012	WWE WrestleFest	
2012	WWE '13	
2013	WWE 2K14	
2014	WWE 2K15	
2015	WWE Immortals	
2015	WWE 2K16	
2016	WWE 2K17	
2017	WWE Champions	
2017	WWE Tap Mania	
2017	WWE 2K18	
2017	WWE Mayhem	
2018	WWE 2K19	
2019	WWE 2K20	
2020	WWE 2K Battlegrounds	
2022	WWE 2K22	
2023	WWE 2K23	
2024	WWE 2K24	
2025	WWE 2K25	
2026	WWE 2K26	

== Championships and accomplishments ==
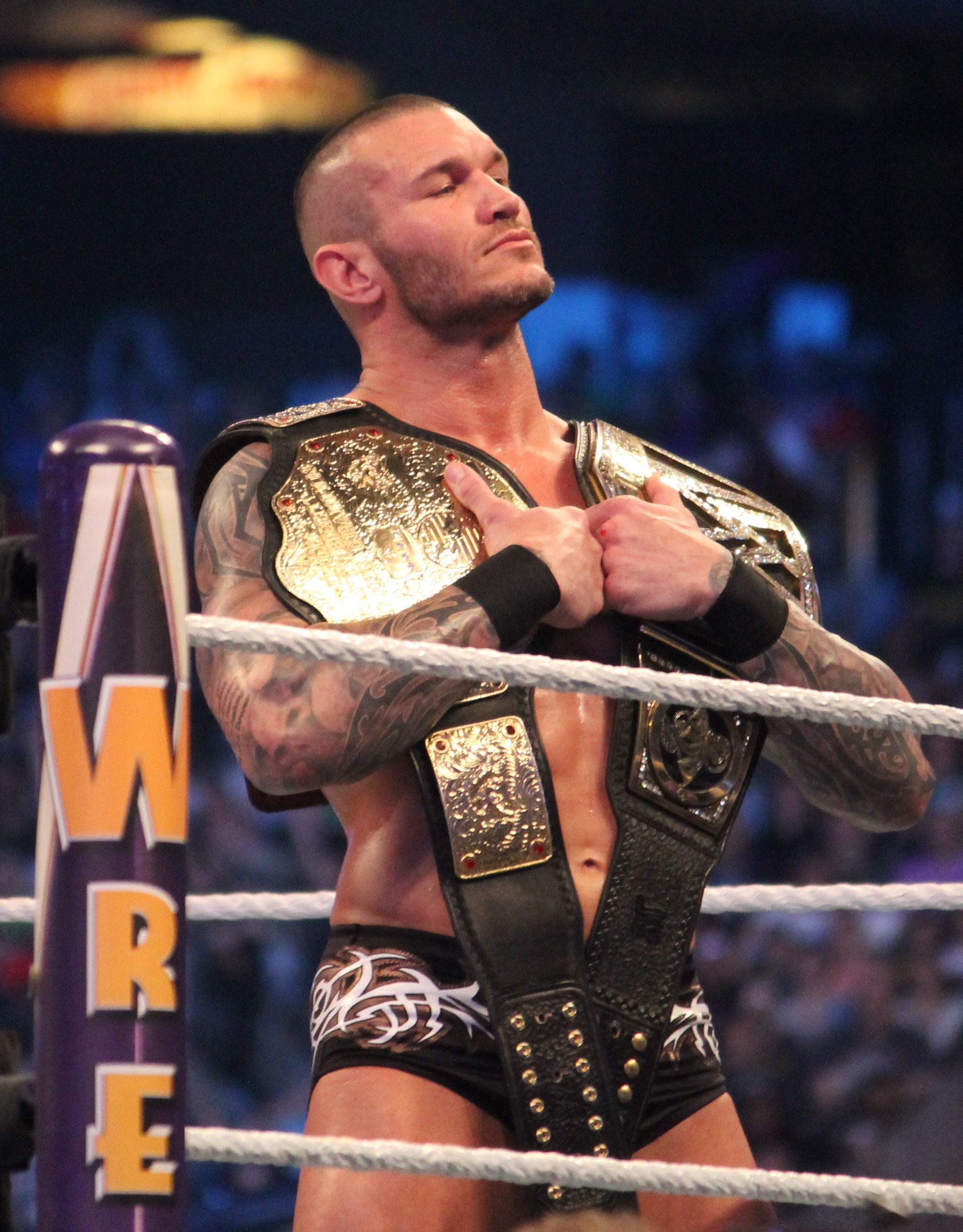
Orton is a 10-time WWE Champion (on his left shoulder) and a four-time World Heavyweight Champion (on his right shoulder), making him an overall 14-time world champion in WWE.

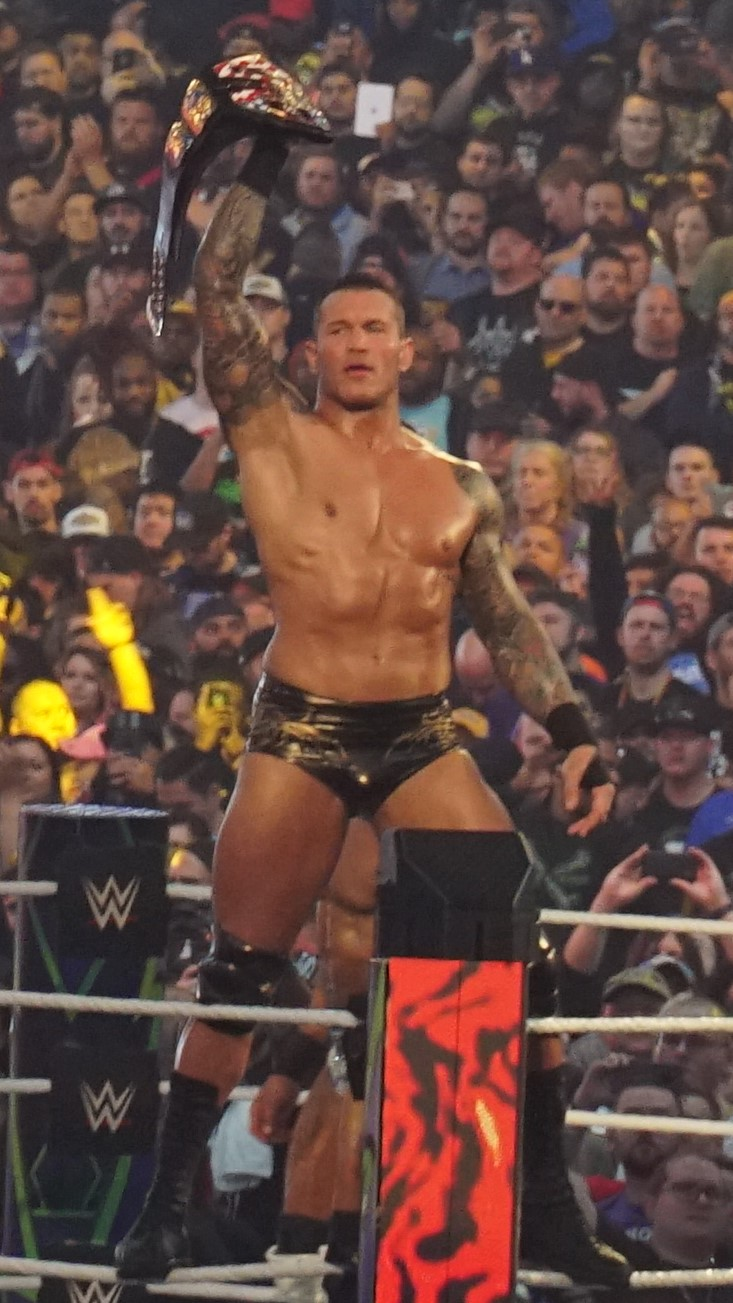
Orton as United States Champion at WrestleMania 34

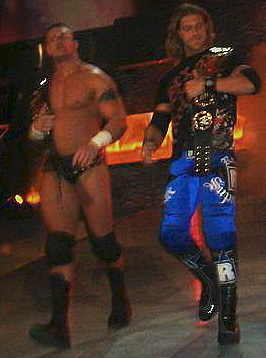
Orton is an overall four-time Tag Team Champion in WWE, including a World Tag Team Championship reign with Edge as Rated RKO.

- The Baltimore Sun
  - Wrestler of the Year (2009)
- Guinness Book of World Records
  - Most appearances on pay-per-view for a male WWE wrestler
- Ohio Valley Wrestling
  - OVW Hardcore Championship (2 times)
- Pro Wrestling Illustrated
  - Feud of the Year (2009) vs. Triple H
  - Most Hated Wrestler of the Year (2007, 2009)
  - Most Improved Wrestler of the Year (2004)
  - Most Popular Wrestler of the Year (2010)
  - Rookie of the Year (2001)
  - Wrestler of the Year (2009, 2010)
  - Ranked No. 1 of the top 500 singles wrestlers in the PWI 500 in 2008
- Sports Illustrated
  - Ranked No. 15 of the 20 Greatest WWE Wrestlers Of All Time
- Total Nonstop Action Wrestling
  - Crossover Moment of the Year (2025) vs Joe Hendry at WrestleMania 41
- World Wrestling Entertainment / WWE
  - WWE Championship (Note: During Orton's 8th reign, the championship was called the WWE World Heavyweight Championship.) (10 times)
  - World Heavyweight Championship (4 times, final)
  - WWE Intercontinental Championship (1 time)
  - WWE United States Championship (1 time)
  - World Tag Team Championship (1 time) – with Edge
  - WWE Raw Tag Team Championship (2 times) – with Riddle
  - WWE SmackDown Tag Team Championship (1 time) – with Bray Wyatt and Luke Harper (Note: Wyatt, Orton and Harper defended the title under the Freebird Rule.)
  - Money in the Bank (2013)
  - Royal Rumble (2009, 2017)
  - 17th Triple Crown Champion
  - 10th Grand Slam Champion (under current format; 18th overall)
  - Slammy Award (2 times)
    - Hashtag of the Year (2014) – #RKOOuttaNowhere
    - Rivalry of the Year (2020) vs. Edge
  - WWE Year-End Award for Shocking Moment of the Year (2018) – Tearing Jeff Hardy's ear
- Wrestling Observer Newsletter
  - Most Improved (2004)
  - Most Disgusting Promotional Tactic (2006) Exploiting the death of Eddie Guerrero ("Eddie's down there... in Hell!" promo)
  - Most Overrated (2013)
  - Worst Feud of the Year (2013) – as member of The Authority vs. Big Show
  - Worst Feud of the Year (2017) vs. Bray Wyatt
  - Worst Feud of the Year (2021) vs. "The Fiend" Bray Wyatt and Alexa Bliss
  - Worst Worked Match of the Year (2017) vs. Bray Wyatt at WrestleMania 33
