= Terry Gibbs (wrestler) =

American professional wrestler (born 1953)

Personal information
- Born: Manny Saine; February 20, 1953 (age 73) Pittsburgh, Pennsylvania, U.S.

Professional wrestling career
- Ring name(s): Terry Gibbs; George Jawjacker
- Billed height: 6 ft 4 in (1.93 m)
- Billed weight: 261 lb (118 kg)
- Trained by: Bob Roop
- Debut: 1977
- Retired: 1989

Manny Saine (born February 20, 1953) is a retired American professional wrestler better known by his ring name Terry Gibbs. He wrestled for the World Wrestling Federation in the 1980s, American Wrestling Association, World Wrestling Council, and the National Wrestling Alliance.

== Professional wrestling career ==
=== Early career (1977–1984) ===
Gibbs began his professional wrestling career in 1977 working in Atlanta. He worked in the Southern Territories. He worked for Angelo Poffo's International Championship Wrestling in 1979 where he won the ICW Southeastern Heavyweight Championship winning a tournament.

On September 7, 1980, he won a tournament to win the NWA Tri-State Heavyweight Championship.

In 1981, he did a tour of Japan for International Wrestling Enterprise.

In 1984, he won the WWC Puerto Rico Championship defeating King Tonga on May 12. He dropped the title a month to Hercules Ayala.

=== World Wrestling Federation (1984–1988) ===
In 1984, Gibbs made his debut in the World Wrestling Federation defeating Jose Luis Rivera. The next night he lost to Sgt. Slaughter. Gibbs challenged WWF Heavyweight Champion Hulk Hogan on December 12, 1984, in London, Ontario which Hogan retained the title. On March 30, 1985 Gibbs teamed with Rene Goulet to face WWF World Tag Team Champions Barry Windham and Mike Rotunda. He would lose to Bret Hart, Jake Roberts, Jimmy Snuka, Tony Atlas, Tito Santana, Ricky Steamboat, and Randy Savage. Gibbs would defeat Omar Atlas, Bob Bradley, Steve Lombardi, Guy Lambert, and Tommy Sharpe.

He lost to Ultimate Warrior in Warrior's television debut on the October 25 episode of WWF Wrestling Challenge.

Gibbs final match was a lost to Owen Hart on July 25, 1988, on a house show in Pulaski, New York.

=== Later career (1988–1989) ===
After WWF, Gibbs worked in Minnesota for the American Wrestling Association in 1989 and retired that year.

== Championships and accomplishments ==
- Central States Wrestling
  - NWA Central States Tag Team Championship (1 time) - with Bob Sweetan
- International Championship Wrestling
  - ICW Southeastern Heavyweight Championship
  - ICW Southeastern Tag Team Championship (2 times) - with Ron Garvin (1) and Bob Roop (1)
- NWA Tri-State
  - NWA Tri-State Heavyweight Championship (1 time)
- World Wrestling Council
  - WWC Puerto Rico Championship (1 time)
  - WWC Caribbean Tag Team Championship (1 time) – with Buddy Landell
  - WWC North American Tag Team Championship (1 time) – with Buddy Landell
