= Bob Roop =

American wrestler (born 1942)

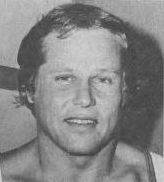
- Roop in 1978

Personal information
- Born: Robert Michael Roop; July 22, 1947 (age 79) Blacksburg, Virginia, U.S.
- Education: Southern Illinois University

Professional wrestling career
- Ring name(s): All-American; Bob Roop; The Enforcer; The Gladiator; Maya Singh; Maha Singh; Star Warrior
- Billed height: 6 ft 1 in (185 cm)
- Billed weight: 270 lb (122 kg)
- Billed from: Blacksburg, Virginia
- Debut: 1969
- Retired: 1987
- Military service
- Allegiance: United States
- Branch: United States Army

Robert Michael Roop (born July 22, 1947) is an American retired amateur wrestler and professional wrestler whose career spanned high school, college, the United States Army, amateur and professional wrestling. He was an American heavyweight Greco-Roman wrestler at the 1968 Summer Olympics.

== Amateur wrestling career ==
Robert Roop began wrestling in the eighth grade in East Lansing, Michigan. In High School, Roop was varsity heavyweight as a freshman, with an inauspicious 0-22-1 record. With the guidance of coach Joe Dibello, his record improved in ensuing years, with a 27-0-0 record his senior year, in which he also won the State Championship.

He entered Michigan State University on a football scholarship. After a year and a half, he left school to join the Army. He received paratrooper training, and signed on to become a Special Forces medic. He competed on the All-Army wrestling team and, later, the All-Services wrestling team. There was one other heavyweight on the All-Services team, Jim Raschke, who had won a bronze medal as the U.S. Greco-Roman Heavyweight at the World Games prior to entering the Army. Raschke went on to become pro wrestler Baron Von Raschke, one of the top talents in the profession.

After his three-year stint in the service, Roop entered Southern Illinois University, and continued amateur wrestling. He attended from 1965 through 1969, majoring in political science, and was a collegiate wrestling standout with a win–loss record of 66-18, including a 16–3 record during his senior year.

While in college he won four National Amateur Athletic Union All-American rankings, earned by placing in the top four spots in the national tournament, and an NAAU Championship as a light-heavyweight. During his last year of college, his coach at Southern Illinois convinced him to train down to a lighter weight of 220 pounds.

Roop was 25 years old when he took part of the Games in Mexico City in 1968. The team was coached by legendary wrestling coach Henry Wittenberg. Roop finished in seventh place.

== Professional wrestling career ==
Roop began his professional career in 1969 after hearing about the pro career of former amateur Larry Heiniemi, better known as Lars Anderson. Heiniemi's tales of global travel and financial success appealed to Roop who began working for Eddie Graham, the promoter of Championship Wrestling from Florida and who trained Roop. Working as an arrogant villain and flaunting his genuine amateur wrestling credentials, Roop challenged for the NWA World Heavyweight Championship on five occasions.

In 1976, Bob Roop needed knee surgery after aggravating an injury received during his amateur career. A scenario was created attributing his knee injury to promoter/wrestler Eddie Graham. The move which supposedly caused the injury, the figure-four, was banned as a crippling hold. While Roop was supposedly recovering, a new wrestler, The Gladiator, appeared on the Florida wrestling scene. The masked Gladiator used the shoulderbreaker, Roop's signature finishing move, and crowds shouted Roop's name when he appeared in the ring. During a Gladiator match on the Championship Wrestling from Florida TV program, Eddie and Mike Graham ran in on the match and removed the mask. The Gladiator was revealed as Roop. This incident is listed as number 24 in the CWF's "The Twenty-Five Greatest Angles In CWF History". After the unmasking, the figure-four was reinstated. This angle was used in 1977 in Roy Shire's San Francisco NWA territory as Roop was "injured" by Kevin Sullivan and then a masked wrestler named The Star Warrior showed up around the same time Roop was injured; later, Sullivan unmasked Star Warrior, who was Roop.

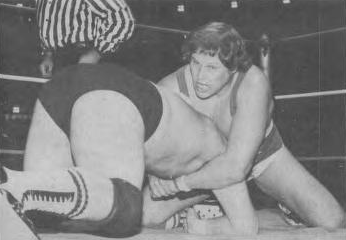
Roop (right) applies a front facelock to Ted DiBiase (left)

Roop also wrestled and sporadically commentated for a time in Mid-South Wrestling, and he is often incorrectly credited for being the man who created the reversal to the figure four leg lock, the hold that "injured" him in Florida. Cowboy Bob Ellis used the maneuver against Buddy Rogers back in the early 1960s.

In the 1980s, Roop wrestled in Angelo Poffo's International Championship Wrestling (ICW) promotion out of Lexington, Kentucky. The promotion at the time featured such future wrestling superstars as 'The Macho Man' Randy Savage, 'The Genius' Lanny Poffo, "Cowboy" Bob Orton Jr. and Ronnie 'Hands of Stone' Garvin.

Roop later became part of the Army of Darkness stable in 1982 which included Kevin Sullivan, Purple Haze, Luna Vachon and Lock, Kharma/Molokai and Fallen Angel. Roop adopted the ring name Mayha Singh, shaving off the hair and beard on half his head and putting face paint on the shaved side.

== Retirement ==
Roop retired from wrestling in 1988 due to a neck injury suffered in a car crash. At the time he also handled booking duties and trained wrestlers at a school in Davie, Florida. An early student of his was Lawrence Pfohl, the future Lex Luger, who Roop broke into the business before turned over training duties to Hiro Matsuda. Looking back on his career in 2000, Roop stated "I had a hell of a lot of fun doing it, and it was quite an education."

Since retirement, Roop has lived in Michigan and worked as a Boy Scouts troop leader.

On July 15, 2006, Bob Roop was inducted into the George Tragos/Lou Thesz Professional Wrestling Hall of Fame. The ceremony was held at the International Wrestling Institute and Museum then in Newton, Iowa (now in Waterloo, Iowa).

== Other media ==
Roop made a cameo appearance in the 1978 Sylvester Stallone movie Paradise Alley.

== Personal life ==
Roop was married twice and has three sons.

== Championships and accomplishments ==
=== Amateur wrestling ===
- Michigan State Wrestling Championship
- National Amateur Athletic Union Champion, Greco-Roman 220 lbs 1969

=== Professional wrestling ===
- Big Time Wrestling (San Francisco)
  - NWA United States Heavyweight Championship (San Francisco version) (1 time)
- Cauliflower Alley Club
  - Gulf Coast/CAC Honoree (2003)
  - Lou Thesz Award (2009)
- Championship Wrestling from Florida
  - NWA Brass Knuckles Championship (Florida version) (1 time)
  - NWA Florida Heavyweight Championship (4 times)
  - NWA Florida Tag Team Championship (4 times) - with Boris Malenko (1), Harley Race (1), and Bob Orton, Jr. (2)
  - NWA Florida Television Championship (1 time)
  - NWA Southern Tag Team Championship (Florida version) (1 time) – with Buddy Fuller
- George Tragos/Lou Thesz Professional Wrestling Hall of Fame
  - Class of 2006
- Georgia Championship Wrestling
  - NWA World Television Championship (Georgia version) (2 times)
- International Championship Wrestling
  - ICW Southeastern Tag Team Championship (3 times) - with Bob Orton, Jr. (1), Terry Gibbs (1), and Big Boy Williams (1)
  - ICW Television Championship (2 times)
- Mid-South Wrestling Association
  - Mid-South Louisiana Heavyweight Championship (1 time)
  - Mid-South North American Heavyweight Championship (1 time)
- Pro Wrestling Illustrated
  - PWI ranked him # 342 of the 500 best singles wrestlers during the "PWI Years" in 2003
- Professional Wrestling Hall of Fame
  - Class of 2019
- Southeastern Championship Wrestling
  - NWA Southeastern Heavyweight Championship (Northern Division) (1 time)^{1}
  - NWA Southeastern Tag Team Championship (2 times) - with Jimmy Golden (1) and Bob Orton, Jr. (1)
  - NWA Southeastern Television Championship (1 time)

== Bibliography ==
- Death Match, Shoulderbreaker Publications (2002) ISBN 0-9718754-0-5
- The Wrestlers' Wrestlers: The Masters of the Craft of Professional Wrestling, ECW Press 2021
