= Pez Whatley =

American professional wrestler (1951–2005)

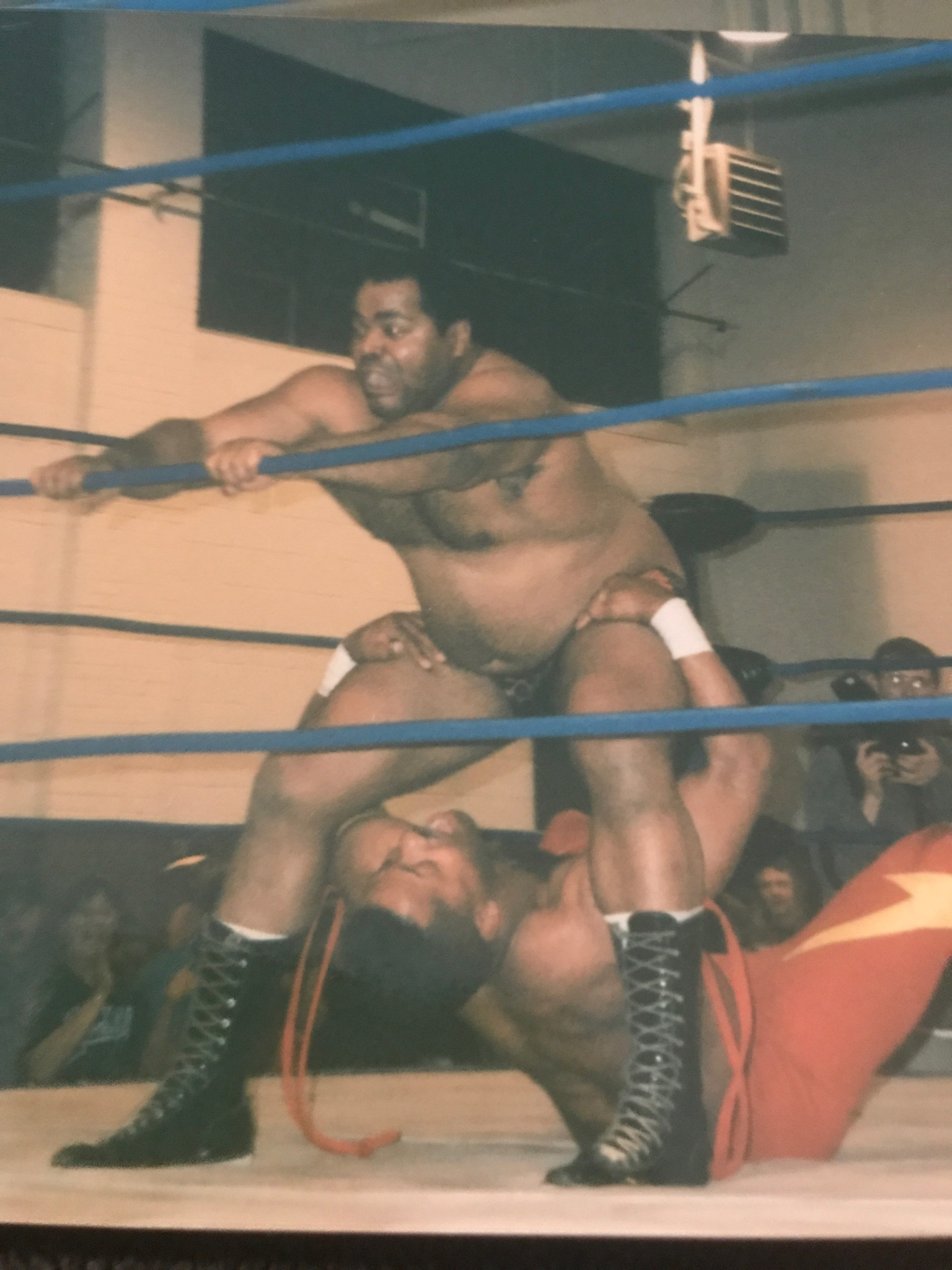
- Whatley (upper) facing Mr Excellent

Personal information
- Born: Pezavan Whatley; January 10, 1951 Chattanooga, Tennessee, U.S.
- Died: January 18, 2005 (aged 54) Chattanooga, Tennessee, U.S.
- Cause of death: Heart attack
- Education: University of Tennessee at Chattanooga

Professional wrestling career
- Ring name(s): Pez Whatley; Shaska Whatley; Shaska; Willie B. Hert; Pistol Pez Whatley
- Billed height: 5 ft 10 in (1.78 m)
- Billed weight: 245 lb (111 kg)
- Billed from: Chattanooga, Tennessee
- Trained by: Saul Weingeroff
- Debut: 1973
- Retired: 1998

Pezavan Whatley (January 10, 1951 – January 18, 2005) was an American professional wrestler best known for his time with NWA Mid-America, Jim Crockett Promotions, World Wrestling Federation and World Championship Wrestling.

== Professional wrestling career ==
Whatley played football and wrestled for Notre Dame High School in Chattanooga, Tennessee and the University of Tennessee at Chattanooga (UTC). He was UTC's first African-American wrestler.

Whatley started wrestling in 1973 after a brief career as a power lifter. He wrestled with the Sheik's Big Time Wrestling, after which he wrestled primarily in Georgia, Alabama, and Tennessee. While in Georgia Championship Wrestling, he had a memorable angle on television, where he was confronted by Junkyard Dog, before a match against Buzz Sawyer. Junkyard Dog slapped Whatley in the face, enraging him enough to pin Sawyer twice in a single episode of World Championship Wrestling. While in Georgia, Whatley had a feud with Paul Ellering's Legion of Doom that included matches against Jake "The Snake" Roberts. He also had a match in the Omni for the United States Heavyweight championship against Greg Valentine.

Whatley went to Championship Wrestling from Florida in 1984. He won the Southern Title twice while there. He was one-third of the "Convertible Blondes" with Rip Rogers and Gary Royal in the Angelo Poffo-promoted International Championship Wrestling, even though he didn't dye his hair blonde. One of Whatley's best-known moments in ICW was the "Mop Head" angle where Whatley had to wear a mop wig after losing a match to Ron Garvin. The match stipulation also required him to keep wearing it until he won another match. This led to not only a lengthy feud with Garvin but also to a long losing streak for Whatley. Most of Whatley's losses were by disqualification due to outside interference when Garvin would attack Whatley's opponent. The angle lasted for several months until Whatley finally won a match.

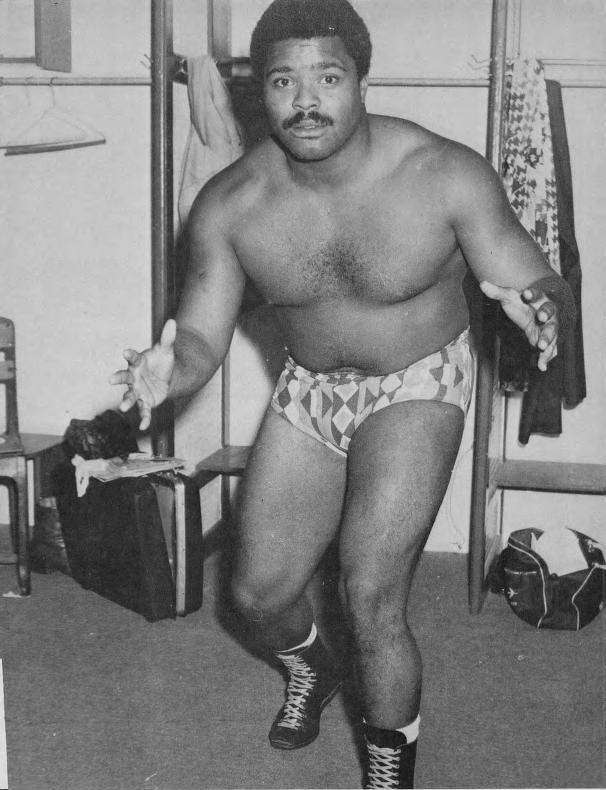
Whatley, c. 1983

He went to the NWA's Jim Crockett Promotions in 1985 and often teamed with Jimmy Valiant against members of Paul Jones' Army. He turned on Valiant, and frequently teamed with The Barbarian and Baron von Raschke in their war against Valiant, and would frequently spit on his opponents during matches. He eventually lost a hair vs. hair match to Valiant and was shaved bald. In 1986, during a short stint when Dusty Rhodes was NWA Champion, Whatley appeared to freelance during a TV interview and made the announcers visibly uncomfortable when he said that he wanted to become the first black NWA Champion.

In late 1987, Whatley had left Jones and started teaming with Tiger Conway Jr. as "The Jive Tones". They did not have much success, and Whatley left for Florida in 1988. He was part of Kevin Sullivan's goon squad in Florida and departed for Alabama shortly after his arrival.

In Alabama's Southeast Championship Wrestling, Whatley became "Willie B. Hert" and was one of the top faces for the company.

In the early 1990s, Whatley had a short stint in Japan's UWFi. He also worked for the World Wrestling Federation as an enhancement talent on their weekly television programs from January 1990 until April 1991, putting over many of the WWF's top stars. He also picked up a few victories on house shows, most notably over Buddy Rose, Paul Diamond and The Genius. Whatley then made sporadic appearances in World Championship Wrestling throughout the 90s as an enhancement talent as well as appearances at the 1995 and 1996 World War 3 events until his in-ring retirement in 1998, becoming a backstage worker for WCW and an assistant trainer at the WCW Power Plant.

Whatley was inducted into the WWE Hall of Fame class of 2021 as a legacy member.

== Death ==
While working for WCW in the late 1990s, Whatley was hospitalized for bronchitis, where doctors discovered he was suffering from heart failure; he was pronounced dead on two occasions while awaiting a heart transplant. He suffered a heart attack in 2003. On January 15, 2005, he had a heart attack and died in the hospital in Chattanooga on January 18. He left behind four children.

== Championships and accomplishments ==
- All-American Wrestling
  - AAW Heavyweight Championship (2 times)
- Championship Wrestling from Florida
  - NWA Southern Heavyweight Championship (Florida version) (2 times)
- Georgia Championship Wrestling
  - Omni Thanksgiving Tag Team Tournament (1983) – with Butch Reed
- International Championship Wrestling
  - ICW United States Heavyweight Championship (1 time)
  - ICW United States Tag Team Championship (1 time) – with Rip Rogers
  - ICW United States Tag Team Championship Tournament (1980) – with Rip Rogers
- NWA Mid-America
  - NWA Mid-America Tag Team Championship (2 times) – with Ray Candy
- Pro Wrestling Illustrated
  - PWI ranked him # 345 of the 500 best singles wrestlers during the "PWI Years" in 2003.
- Universal Wrestling Association
  - UWA Heavyweight Championship (1 time)
- Western States Sports
  - NWA Western States Tag Team Championship (2 times) – with Abe Jacobs
- WWE
  - WWE Hall of Fame (Class of 2021)
- Other titles
  - NCW Tag Team Championship (1 time) – with Sam McGraw
