= Rip Rogers =

American retired professional wrestler (born 1954)

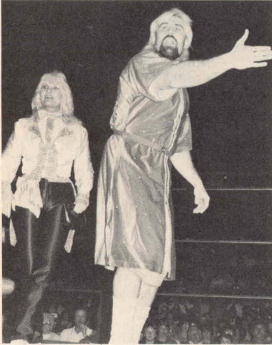
- Rogers (front) and Brenda Britton (back), circa 1985

Personal information
- Born: Mark Sciarra; February 7, 1954 (age 72) Seymour, Indiana, U.S.
- Education: Indiana Central College

Professional wrestling career
- Ring name(s): Disco Kid; Hercules Simard; Mark Skeara; Rip Rogers
- Billed height: 6 ft 0 in (1.83 m)
- Billed weight: 215 lb (98 kg)
- Billed from: Seymour, Indiana; Lexington, Kentucky
- Debut: 1975
- Retired: 2010

Mark Sciarra (born February 7, 1954), better known by his ring name Rip Rogers, is an American retired professional wrestler.

== Early life ==
Sciarra was born in Seymour, Indiana on February 7, 1954. He graduated from Seymour High School in 1972 and went on to attend Indiana Central College, graduating in 1976. Sicarra worked as a teacher for a year before deciding to become a professional wrestler.

== Professional wrestling career ==
Rip Rogers started wrestling in 1975. He formed the "Convertible Blondes" with Pez Whatley and Gary Royal in Angelo Poffo's International Championship Wrestling (ICW) and won the Tag Team Titles with Royal. As with The Fabulous Freebirds defending regional NWA tag team championships with any two of the three members, the Convertible Blondes also used the so-called "Freebird Rule" to defend the ICW Tag Team Championship in this manner. He left the ICW following a dispute with Angelo Poffo's son Randy Poffo, better known by his ring name Randy Savage.

In 1979, Rogers went to the National Wrestling Alliance's Portland territory, Pacific Northwest Wrestling, where he was aligned with Buddy Rose and Ed Wiskoski. He would also make trips to Vancouver's All-Star Wrestling.

In 1984, he went to the Mid-Atlantic territory, Jim Crockett Promotions, where he formed "The Hollywood Blonds" with Ted Oates and won the National Tag Team Titles. By early 1986, he was in the Memphis territory, Continental Wrestling Association, feuding with Dutch Mantel.

In September 1986, "The Hustler," managed by his then-wife Brenda Britton, joined Continental Championship Wrestling and immediately feuded with "The Exotic" Adrian Street and Miss Linda, until leaving the Gulf Coast area in March 1987.

Rogers wrestled as a heel in Bob Geigel's Central States promotion during most of 1987.

The Ripper spent most of 1988 and 1989 in Calgary Stampede Wrestling. Strangely given his history and reputation he was mainly a lower to mid card performer. Yet he always seemed to get a rise out of the crowd as an antagonizing heel. Rogers received a small push near the end of his run in Stampede (the territory shut up shop at the end of '89). When he teamed with longtime Stampede veteran Kerry Brown as part of the Midnight Cowboys tag team. They had a running feud with popular International Tag Team Champs Bad Company, which included Bruce Hart and Flyin' Brian Pillman.

In 1989, he wrestled for the World Wrestling Council (WWC) in Puerto Rico as one of their top heels with partner Abbuda Dein.

He was back in the NWA in time for it to be renamed World Championship Wrestling (WCW). He wrestled in WCW from 1991 to 1994 as a jobber and he lost several matches to Pillman. Rogers later substituted for Pillman, being the scapegoat in the ill-fated Yellow Dog angle. His biggest win was at Battlebowl in 1993 where he teamed with Road Warrior Hawk (who attacked him prior to the match but later used him to his advantage during the finish) and defeated Davey Boy Smith and Kole to qualify for the battle royal main event, though he was the first man eliminated in that 16-man bout. While working for WCW in 1991 he also competed in Global Wrestling Federation where he joined The Cartel, which included Scotty Anthony, Makhan Singh and Cactus Jack. They were the top heels for several months and he created a lot of havoc while there.

After that run, he occasionally wrestled in the United States, wrestling for a time with a promotion in Indianapolis known as Circle City Wrestling. He finally settled in Ohio Valley Wrestling (OVW) in 1997. He teamed with Dave the Rave and formed the "Suicide Blondes" with Jason Lee. When he retired from active competition in 2000, he was named head trainer at OVW. At the age of 48, Rogers was hit by a car and sustained injuries which forced him to completely retire from in-ring competition; according to a 2011 story on OVW, the accident left him "with a stiff limp". Rogers currently runs an advanced wrestling class at OVW, where he teaches up and coming wrestlers.

As head trainer for OVW, Rogers has been involved in training over thirty wrestlers who appeared in WWE or Impact Wrestling, notably including John Cena, Brock Lesnar, Dave Bautista, Randy Orton, Bobby Lashley, Mark Henry, and The Miz.

Rogers was known for his berserk reaction after losing a match. Even after being cleanly pinned, Rogers would vociferously protest to the referee that his opponent had cheated. Usually, he would claim that his hair or trunks had been pulled by the other wrestler to score the victory. These claims would be accompanied by a frenzied voice and wild pantomimes of hair and trunk pulling. Rogers wrestled his last match on August 6, 2010, for Pro South Wrestling losing in a 6-man tag match in Alabama.

== Boxing career ==
Rogers also fought in 3 professional boxing matches in 1996 at 41 years old. His record stands at 1 win, 1 loss, 1 draw, with 1 TKO. He was trained by longtime friend Bobby "Sweetpain" Duchi, a veteran professional boxer, kickboxer, and champion weightlifter.

== Other media ==
Rogers made an appearance in the 1993 music video for "Human Wheels" by fellow Seymour native John Mellencamp.

Rogers has made some appearances on The Pat McAfee Show, when it was part of Barstool Sports.

== Personal life ==
Sciarra is married.

== Championships and accomplishments ==
- Atlantic Grand Prix Wrestling

- AGPW International Heavyweight Championship (2 times)

- Big Time Wrestling
  - BTW Ohio Tag Team Championship (1 time) - with Bobby Fulton
- Cauliflower Alley Club
  - Ron Hutchison Trainers Award (2026)
- Central States Wrestling

- NWA Central States Television Championship (1 time)

- Georgia Championship Wrestling

- NWA National Tag Team Championship (1 time) – with Ted Oates

- International Championship Wrestling

- ICW United States Tag Team Championship (2 times) – with Ricky Starr (1) and Pez Whatley (1)

- NWA Mid-America

- NWA Mid-America Heavyweight Championship (1 time)

- Ohio Valley Wrestling

- OVW Heavyweight Championship (3 times)
- OVW Southern Tag Team Championship (3 times) – with Dave the Rave (2) and Jason Lee (1)

- Southeastern Championship Wrestling

- NWA Southeast United States Junior Heavyweight Championship (2 times)

- World Wrestling Council

- WWC Caribbean Heavyweight Championship (1 time)
- WWC World Tag Team Championship (2 times) – with Abbuda Dein
