= Thunderbolt Patterson =

American professional wrestler (born 1941)

Personal information
- Born: Claude Patterson; July 8, 1941 (age 85) Waterloo, Iowa, U.S.

Professional wrestling career
- Ring name(s): Claude Peters; K.O. Patterson; Sweet Daddy Brown; T-Bolt; Thunderbolt Patterson; Thunderbolt Peters
- Billed height: 6 ft 0 in (183 cm)
- Billed weight: 242 lb (110 kg)
- Billed from: Atlanta, Georgia
- Trained by: Pat O'Connor; Steve Kovacs
- Debut: 1964
- Retired: 1994

Claude Patterson (born July 8, 1941) is an American retired professional wrestler, known by his ring name Thunderbolt Patterson. He began his career in 1964 and wrestled primarily in Florida, Georgia and the Carolinas. During the early 1970s, he was blacklisted by the National Wrestling Alliance for repeated appearances with outlaw promotions, his complaints of institutional racism and attempts to form a wrestlers' labor union.

== Professional wrestling career ==
Patterson had grown up in Iowa and worked for John Deere in Waterloo, Iowa when he broke into professional wrestling in the Kansas City area. Promoter Gus Karras put Patterson in matches against Don Soto in 1964. In 1965, Patterson moved to Texas and worked with promoter Dory Funk Sr. The following year, he traveled to California, where he held the WWA Tag Team Championship with Alberto Torres. He also continued to work in Texas, where he worked as a villainous character in Dallas until he was turned on by his partner Boris Malenko. Fritz Von Erich had a Russian chain match with Malenko for Patterson's contract which Malenko owned.

In 1969, he worked for Big Time Wrestling in Michigan and Ohio.

In 1970, he feuded with Jose Lothario and held the Florida version of the NWA Brass Knuckles Championship.

Patterson agreed to work for an outlaw promotion (that is, one outside of the NWA) run by Ann Gunkel, the widow of his old friend and Georgia promoter Ray Gunkel, in January 1974. In January 1975, he moved to Big Time Wrestling in Detroit. In December 1975, he began to wrestle for the NWA promotion in Florida where he remained until April 1976. In 1976, he won the NWA Florida Heavyweight Championship from Bruiser Brody. In 1977, he scored a surprise pinfall win over The Sheik in Toronto for the U.S. title but lost three weeks later. He then switched to Georgia Championship Wrestling where he remained until 1980.

He spoke out against poor working conditions for wrestlers in the 1970s and participated in a racial discrimination lawsuit. He has claimed that as a result, he was blacklisted from wrestling in the mid-1970s. He had been complaining about racism from promoters for many years (he would later recall that only Dory Funk Sr. had backed him) and wanted to start a wrestlers' union, a dream he shared with former NFL player and wrestler Jim Wilson, himself blacklisted. He has said that it was years, with Patterson claiming to be working at the Los Angeles Times in the interim, before he has said his blacklisting was lifted, when Dusty Rhodes took ill in Florida in 1975.

Patterson joined Ole Anderson as a tag team partner in 1984 and they briefly held the NWA National Tag Team Championship. Ole's kayfabe cousin, a young Arn Anderson, came to the sport, and Ole, saying he was "tired of carrying guys like Patterson and Dusty Rhodes" broke up with Patterson, and joined Arn in what would be the foundation for the Four Horsemen which would include NWA Heavyweight Champion Ric Flair and Tully Blanchard.

Patterson retired from full time wrestling in 1985. He then appeared in the ring in 1993 at a "Legends Reunion Match" at Slamboree '93, where he teamed with Brad Armstrong to defeat Ivan Koloff and Baron von Raschke. He would also mentor Ice Train, until retiring completely in 1994.

On July 27, 2019, Patterson was inducted into the 2019 Class of the George Tragos/Lou Thesz Professional Wrestling Hall of Fame in his hometown of Waterloo.

On March 13, 2024, it was announced that Patterson would be inducted into the WWE Hall of Fame.

== Personal life ==
In 1988, he was a labor organizer for Service Employees International Union in Atlanta.

Patterson is also an ordained minister.

Thunderbolt Patterson is featured in the film, This World Is Not My Own: The Limitless Life of Nellie Mae Rowe which premiered in 2023 at South By Southwest Film Festival (SXSW). The artist watched Thunderbolt faithfully on television during the 1970s and drew likenesses of him from time to time. They never met in person. Patterson found out about Rowe and her drawings of him and said that Rowe "kept me alive."

== Championships and accomplishments ==
- Cauliflower Alley Club
  - Men's Wrestling Award (2021)
- Championship Wrestling from Florida
  - NWA Brass Knuckles Championship (Florida version) (1 time)
  - NWA Florida Heavyweight Championship (1 time)
- Championship Wrestling from Georgia
  - NWA National Tag Team Championship (1 time) - with Ole Anderson
- Continental Wrestling Association
  - CWA World Heavyweight Championship (1 time)
- George Tragos/Lou Thesz Professional Wrestling Hall of Fame
  - Lou Thesz Award (2019)
- Georgia Championship Wrestling
  - NWA Georgia Tag Team Championship (3 times) - with Mr. Wrestling (1), Tommy Rich (1), and Tony Atlas (1)
  - NWA Georgia Television Championship (2 times)
- International Championship Wrestling
  - ICW United States Heavyweight Championship (1 time)
- Maple Leaf Wrestling
  - NWA United States Heavyweight Championship (Toronto version) (1 time)
- Mid-Atlantic Championship Wrestling
  - NWA Atlantic Coast Tag Team Championship (1 time) - with Jerry Brisco
  - NWA World Tag Team Championship ( Mid-Atlantic Version ) (1 time) - with Tony Atlas
- NWA Big Time Wrestling
  - NWA American Tag Team Championship (4 times) - with Wahoo McDaniel (2) Toru Tanaka (1), and Johnny Valentine (1)
- NWA Tri-State
  - NWA Brass Knuckles Championship (Tri-State version) (1 time)
- Western States Sports
  - NWA Brass Knuckles Championship (Amarillo version) (4 times)
- World Wrestling Association
  - WWA World Tag Team Championship (1 time) - with Alberto Torres
- Wrestling Observer Newsletter
  - Worst on Interviews (1985)
- WWE
  - WWE Hall of Fame (Class of 2024)
