= George Weingeroff =

American retired professional wrestler (born 1952)

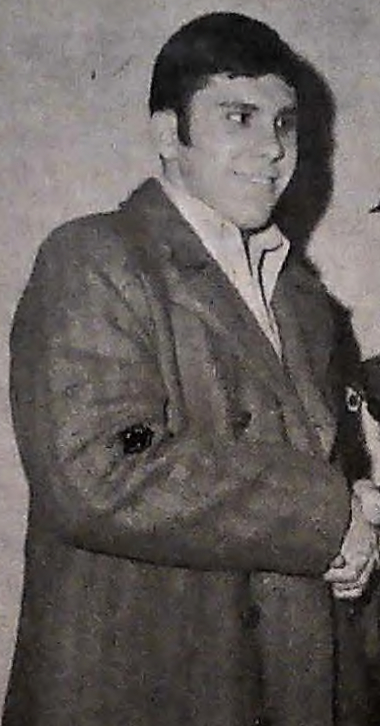
- Weingeroff c. 1973

Personal information
- Born: George Weingeroff; November 22, 1952 (age 73) Nashville, Tennessee, U.S.

Professional wrestling career
- Ring names: George Weingeroff; The Sheik; Sheik Hussein; Sheik Abdul Hussein; King Cobra; Abdul Hassan
- Billed height: 6 ft 1 in (185 cm)
- Billed weight: 233 lb (106 kg)
- Billed from: Middle East (as Sheik Hussein)
- Debut: 1975
- Retired: 1993

George Weingeroff (born November 22, 1952) is an American retired professional wrestler. He is best known for his appearances with International Championship Wrestling, Championship Wrestling from Florida, and Mid-South Wrestling during the late 1970s and 1980s.

== Amateur wrestling career ==
Weingeroff started amateur wrestling in high school and would become an amateur and collegiate champion. He later attended the University of Tennessee.

== Professional wrestling career ==
Weingeroff began his professional wrestling career in 1975 in Florida. In 1977, he debuted for NWA Mid-America based in Nashville.

In 1979 he started working for Angelo Poffo's International Championship Wrestling in Louisville, Kentucky. He become well known for that promotion. Weingeroff would team with Poffo's son Lanny winning the ICW United States Tag Team Championship four times. He left ICW in 1983.

In 1983, he would work for Mid-South Wrestling and later World Class Championship Wrestling and Championship Wrestling from Florida from 1984 to 1985.

He would work for All Japan Pro Wrestling in 1987. That same year, Weingeroff and Danny Fargo held the MCWA Tag Team Championship in Dale Mann's Mid-Continental Wrestling Association.

Later in his career, he would wrestle as Sheik Hussein and Abdul Hassan. Also worked in the early 1990s for Smoky Mountain Wrestling and World Championship Wrestling. He also wrestled on the Tennessee independent circuit including, most notably, for Freddie Morton's Mid-South Wrestling Association in Columbia and Bud Petty, Randall Fanning and Steve Bryant's Hardcore Championship Wrestling in McMinnville, Tennessee, winning the heavyweight titles in both promotions.

He would retire from wrestling in 1993 but continued making occasional appearances as "The Sheik" on the local independent circuit. On May 11, 1996, Weingeroff was recognized as the inaugural heavyweight champion for Scott Little's Independent Championship Wrestling based in Mt. Vernon, Illinois. The title was held up following a match against his former student, The California Kid, that same night. He eventually lost to The California Kid in the rematch held in Nashville, Illinois on September 21, 1996.

== Mixed martial arts career ==
Weingeroff debuted in mixed martial arts in Pancrase in Japan on September 21, 1993, against Kazuo Takahashi. The match ended with a knocked out by Takahashi with a roundhouse kick.

=== Mixed martial arts record ===
Professional record breakdown
1 match	0 wins	1 loss
By knockout	0	1
By submission	0	0
By decision	0	0

Res.	Record	Opponent	Method	Event	Date	Round	Time	Location	Notes
Loss	0-1	(Japan) Kazuo Takahashi	KO (high kick)	Pancrase: Yes, We Are Hybrid Wrestlers 1	September 21, 1993	1	1:23	Tokyo, Japan	

== Personal life ==
Weingeroff is visually impaired. He reportedly had most of his sight restored via surgery.

Weingeroff is the son of wrestling manager Saul Weingeroff. He would train Demolition Smash, Lodi, Mike Samples and the California Kid.

== Championships and accomplishments ==
- Hardcore Championship Wrestling
  - HCW Championship (1 time)
- Independent Championship Wrestling
  - ICW Championship (1 time)
- International Championship Wrestling
  - ICW United States Tag Team Championship (4 times) – with Lanny Poffo (4)
- Mid-Continental Wrestling Association
  - MCWA Tag Team Championship (1 time) – with Danny Fargo
- Mid-South Wrestling Association
  - MSWA Tennessee Championship (4 times)
