= Batten Twins =

Professional wrestling tag team

The Batten Twins

Tag team
- Name(s): The Batten Brothers; U.S. Express; The Wild Angels
- Members: Bart Batten; Brad Batten; Downtown Bruno (manager); Scotty Ace (manager)
- Billed heights: Bart: 5 ft 10 in (1.78 m); Brad: 5 ft 10 in (1.78 m)
- Combined billed weight: 453 lb (205 kg)
- Hometown: Mount Hope, West Virginia, U.S.
- Billed from: Charleston, West Virginia (CWA); Kansas City, Missouri (WCCW)
- Former members: Brent Batten
- Debut: May 12, 1983
- Disbanded: May 21, 2005
- Years active: 1983–2005

The Batten Twins were an American professional wrestling tag team, consisting of twin brothers Bart and Brad Batten. They performed under the "Batten Twins" name in Central States Wrestling, Continental Wrestling Association, International Championship Wrestling, Jim Crockett Promotions, Southern Championship Wrestling, Texas All-Star Wrestling, World Championship Wrestling, and the World Wrestling Council, and the name U.S. Express in World Class Championship Wrestling. The team also appeared in various independent promotions during the 1990s including, most notably, Atlantic Coast Championship Wrestling, IWA Mid-South, Smoky Mountain Wrestling and Southern States Wrestling.

A popular tag team in the Southern United States during the 1980s, the Battens faced off against some of the top tag teams of the era. They began their wrestling career working for the Poffo family in 1983. As identical twins, the brothers were a rarity in pro wrestling at the time of their debut. Their tenure in the NWA's Central States territory saw them engaged in a long feud with Sheik Abdullah. They held the NWA Central States Tag Team Championship a record four times, defeating The Midnight Express, the Midnight Rockers, Sheik Abdullah and Akio Sato, and Bobby Jaggers (in a singles match) for the title.

The Battens were also major stars in Puerto Rico during the late-1980s where they won WWC Tag Team Championship four times and the WWC Caribbean Tag Team Championship twice. Their unexpected "heel turn" made them one of the most hated wrestlers in the country. After returning to the U.S., the Battens continued wrestling on the Southern independent circuit until the early-2000s. In April 2005, The Batten Twins ended their 23-year career with a retirement tour of their home state.

== Early life ==
Bradley Jay "Brad" Batten and Bartley Alan "Bart" Batten were born to Marjorie (née Hayes) and Jack Batten in New Martinsville, West Virginia on September 8, 1958. They were involved in youth sports at an early age. In 1969, the brothers were featured in The Charleston Daily Mail about identical twins who participate in little league baseball. Both brothers played football from junior high to college with Bart attending West Virginia State University and Brad going to Glenville State College. As both schools had a longtime football rivalry, the brothers often played against each other but with Bart as a wide receiver and Brad a running back they were never on the field at the same time. In addition to teaching school, Bart Batten went on to play two years of semi-professional football for the West Virginia Rockets.

== Professional wrestling career ==
=== International Championship Wrestling (1983–1984) ===
Both brothers were wrestling fans and decided to try out for a career in pro wrestling after attending several International Championship Wrestling shows in the early 1980s. The two spent about a year working out until they each weighed 210 lb (95 kg). They also experimented with steroids during this time. Then living in St. Albans, West Virginia, Bart approached Lanny Poffo at an ICW show in Beckley. The wrestler introduced Brad to his brother Randy Savage and invited the brothers to the promotion's next show in Marmet to meet with their father Angelo Poffo. Lanny later admitted to Brad that he was skeptical about him having a twin brother but when the twins entered the dressing room the Poffo family "saw dollar signs" as identical twins were very rare in the wrestling business at the time.

The Battens were initially trained by Lanny Poffo in Sutton, West Virginia. Bart recalled that Poffo had tried to "shoot on him" during their first day of training by putting him in a front facelock. He had wrestled three years in high school, however, and was able to reverse the facelock and make Poffo submit to a guillotine hold. Their training progressed quickly after this incident, with both Angelo Poffo and Randy Savage taking part, and they were put into their first match after only a few sessions. The brothers became close friends with both Lanny and Randy. Brad especially became a key figure behind the scenes by helping produce ICW's television show as well as driving the ring truck and setting up the ring.

They made their pro debut on May 12, 1983, against Tony Falk and Doug Vines in Prestonsburg, Kentucky. Brad was injured shortly after their debut when he blew out his left knee performing a jumping high five and toe kick with his brother. Ironically, this would become a signature maneuver during their career. He would be out of action for nearly a year and a half. While his brother was recovering from his injury, Bart was paired with Johnny Wilhoit and subsequently defeated Tojo Yamamoto and Gypsy Joe for the ICW United States Tag Team Championship. They remained champions until the promotion's close the following year.

=== Continental Wrestling Association (1984–1985) ===
After ICW's close, Brad Batten began working for rival promoter Jerry Jarrett's Continental Wrestling Association promotion in Memphis, Tennessee. Wrestling under the name "Mark Batten", he made his first appearance at the Mid-South Coliseum teaming with Porkchop Cash against AWA Southern Tag Team Champions Tommy Rich and Eddie Gilbert on April 30, 1984. Following their loss, Batten formed a new tag team with Johnny Wilhoit called "The New Generation". A music video filmed on Jarrett's estate near Nashville was aired on Memphis Championship Wrestling to introduce the team; it became a viral video after it was shown by Jon Stewart on The Daily Show nearly thirty years later. The team was intended to capitalize on the popularity of The Fabulous Ones and The Rock 'n' Roll Express but they failed to catch on with fans. The New Generation's last match was against The Dirty White Boys (Tony Anthony and Len Denton) at the Mid-South Coliseum on October 8, 1984, which they lost.

Brad was eventually joined by his brother and had their first match together against former trainers Lanny Poffo and Randy Savage. At the end of year, the team had several matches against The Nightmares (Danny Davis and Ken Wayne). The brothers also wrestled Plowboy Frazier in three separate handicap matches at the Mid-South Coliseum between December 31, 1984, and January 28, 1985. They lost to Frazier and Adrian Street in a tag team match that same month. On February 11, the Battens got their revenge on Frazier when they finally beat him in a handicap match; due to the pre-match stipulations, the twins would have lost their hair had they lost the match.

In their first three months together, the Battens faced Eddie Gilbert & "Iron" Mike Sharpe, The Terminators (Crow and Riggs), and The Wild Hoggs (J.R. and King Harley Hogg) at WMC Studio. In April 1985, Brad Batten wrestled single matches against Mike Sharpe, Mr. Wrestling and AWA Southern Heavyweight Champion Randy Savage. The Batten Twins also challenged The PYT Express (Koko Ware and Norvell Austin) for the AWA Southern Tag Team Championship but they were unsuccessful in winning the title. That summer, the Battens battled Hot Property (Billy Travis and Ron Sexton) and The Kiwi Sheepherders (Jonathan Boyd and Rip Morgan) before leaving the area.

=== NWA Central States (1985–1986) ===
The Batten Twins moved on to the NWA's Central States territory where they had a long-running feud with Sheik Abdullah The Great and his various tag team partners, most often Akio Sato and Tarzan Goto, but also including American Starship Coyote and Mr. Pogo. Within a few weeks of their arrival, they also received a title shot against NWA Central States Tag Team Champions "Bulldog" Bob Brown and Marty Jannetty. It was during this match that the champions split up when Brown stopped cooperating with his partner. The championship remained vacant until The Batten Twins defeated The Midnight Express (Dennis Condrey and Bobby Eaton) in a tournament final on November 21, 1985.

Their first title reign lasted three months before the championship was held-up following a title defense in Kansas City, Kansas against Sheik Abdullah and Akio Sato on February 20, 1986. The title was returned to The Batten Twins following a rematch one week later. On March 6, Bart Batten defeated Sheik Abdullah in a Texas Death match. Batten took the first fall when he made his opponent submit to an abdominal stretch while Abdullah took the next two wins by pinfall. The bout ended when Abdullah failed to get up after a 10-count. Batten had previously lost to Abdullah in an Iranian Death match two months earlier. On April 19, the team entered the inaugural Jim Crockett, Sr. Memorial Cup Tag Team Tournament at the Louisiana Superdome but were eliminated in the first round by Nelson Royal and Sam Houston.

In May 1986, The Batten Twins were defeated by the young duo of Marty Jannetty and Shawn Michaels, The Midnight Rockers, for the NWA Central States Tag Team titles. They quickly regained the belts from The Midnight Rockers the following week, causing Michaels to leave the territory, but dropped them to Hacksaw Higgins and J.R. Hogg on May 29. Though their feud was short-lived, the Battens considered The Midnight Rockers one of their favorite opponents of all time.

=== World Class Championship Wrestling (1986) ===
Bart and Brad Batten were brought into World Class Championship Wrestling during the summer of 1986. The team was renamed the U.S. Express and Bart given the name "Mark Batten". One day after losing the NWA Central States belts, they made their WCCW television debut against Killer Brooks and Matt Borne in Dallas, Texas on May 30, 1986.

On June 9, The Batten Twins and Steve Simpson beat Matt Borne, Killer Brooks and The Assassin in a six-man tag team match. During the next two months, The Battens scored victories over Jerry Allen and The Grapplers (Grappler #1 and Grappler #2). On July 11, they were beaten by Matt Borne and Dingo Warrior. A week later in Fort Worth, both brothers wrestled in singles matches; Bart Batten was pinned by WCCW Television Champion "Mad Dog" Buzz Sawyer, however, Brad Batten beat Dingo Warrior via disqualification. After the Batten-Sawyer bout, Sawyer put Bart Batten in a gorilla press slam and tossed him over the top rope. He fell 20 feet onto the concrete floor. The WCCW TV Champion then attacked Brad Batten and Perry Jackson, who were coming to aid Bart, which instigated a 4-man brawl between Sawyer and Borne versus Steve Simpson and Kevin Von Erich. Brad Batten later talked with Fritz von Erich about booking the brothers as "heels" and suggested a "family vs. family" storyline pitting the Batten and Von Erich brothers against each other but the promoter turned down the idea.

At Labor Day Star Wars '86, The Batten Twins lost to Mark Lewin and Kevin Sullivan in the opening rounds of championship tournament for the WCWA World Tag Team Championship. The next night at Fort Hood's Prichard Stadium, The Batten Twins defeated Killer Brooks and Perry Jackson. Moments after Bart pinned Jackson, their opponents began fighting with each other with Brooks vowing never to partner with Jackson again. They lost to Rick Rude and Jos LeDuc a week later in Fort Worth. At the 3rd Cotton Bowl Extravaganza, The Batten Twins were beaten by Chris and Mark Youngblood.

=== Texas All-Star Wrestling (1986) ===
The Battens made a brief appearance in Texas All-Star Wrestling before they departed the territory. On November 1, Brad Batten wrestled Master Gee on the debut episode of Texas Championship Wrestling. The Batten Twins faced The Grapplers the following week. Brad Batten made a third and final appearance for TASW on the November 15th 1986 episode of Texas Championship Wrestling against Black Bart.

=== NWA Central States (1986–1987) ===
By December 1986, the Batten Twins were back in NWA Central States and had scored victories over The Thunderfoots (Thunderfoot #1 and Thunderfoot #2) and Porkchop Cash & Colt Steele. On January 30, 1987, Brad and Bart Batten lost a chance to regain the NWA Central States Tag Team Championship from The MOD Squad (Spike and Basher) at the St. Louis Arena. The match was later aired on the Jim Crockett Promotions television special "NWA Super Towns on the Superstation". The winning team won an invitation to the second annual Jim Crockett, Sr. Memorial Cup Tag Team Tournament. On February 27, Brad Batten teamed with Rick McCord to beat The MOD Squad for the belts. They soon became involved in a feud with Porkchop Cash and Ken Timbs. The title was declared held-up on April 3 after a controversial title defense against Cash and Timbs when the former used a foreign object to win the match; a rematch was held a week later for the belts, which Batten and McCord lost.

Three months later, Brad Batten and Bobby Jaggers were awarded the vacant titles by the NWA after Karl Kovac was fired and The Warlord left to work in Japan. Batten and Jaggers split up two months later. The title was decided in a singles match between them on August 6, which Batten won. This allowed The Batten Twins to regain the title as Brad chose Bart Batten as his partner. They were joined by Downtown Bruno as their manager. Brad and Bart Batten faced The Kansas Outlaws (Bobby Jaggers and Psycho Sam) in Carroll, Iowa and Sheldon, Missouri later that month. Their fourth and final title reign came to an end when the team was defeated by Rick McCord and Porkchop Cash in Versailles, Missouri on November 9, 1987.

=== World Organization of Wrestling (1987–1988) ===
The Battens moved on to World Organization of Wrestling in Pensacola, Florida where they feuded with Badd Company (Paul Diamond and Pat Tanaka) and The Fabulous Fargos (Ken Timbs and Pat Rose). They teamed with Mr. Olympia in several six-man tag team matches against The Fargos and Bob Holly. One of the team's matches saw their opponents break up when Big Bubba turned on his partner Samoan Kokina.

=== World Wrestling Council (1988–1989) ===
After a brief stint in Southern Championship Wrestling, The Batten Twins went to Puerto Rico to compete in the World Wrestling Council where they found considerable success. Their stay in the country was not without some controversy, however. The Battens were among the six American wrestlers who decided to remain after the murder of Bruiser Brody on July 17, 1988. Wrestling Observer editor Dave Meltzer speculated that the team may have had "legit heat" as they were the only wrestlers to leave a U.S. promotion to compete in Puerto Rico and "may have to stay there until this all blows over". Bart Batten later defended their decision as they had families to support and could not afford to turn down bookings. The Battens had been fans of Brody prior to entering wrestling, later becoming friends with him while in NWA Central States and WCCW, and Brad felt that their old friend "wouldn't have held it against us".

On August 6, they defeated The Ninja Express (Kendo Nagasaki and Mr. Pogo) in San Juan, Puerto Rico for the WWC Tag Team Championship. A month later at WWC Aniversario 1988, the Battens retained the titles against The Sheepherders (Butch Miller and Luke Williams). The Sheepherders had initially been declared the winners after Miller had interfered in the match by hitting Brad in the head with a flagpole. A second official came out to inform the referee what had occurred and the Battens were awarded the match via disqualification. The Batten Twins later provided commentary with Ecuadorian promoter Hugo Savinovich when the match was released on DVD. They consider this bout one of the greatest matches of their career. They lost the title to Chicky and Ron Starr in Aguadilla on October 16, but they won the titles back in Caguas on November 12, 1988. The team lost the title two months later to Dan Kroffat and Tama the Islander. The Batten Twins regained the belts for a third time in Bayamón on March 4, 1989, only to drop the belts to Jason the Terrible and Steve Strong a week later. That same month, The Batten Twins were featured as part of a cover story for Wrestling Life.

That spring the Battens were on the look out for more tag team gold. They beat The Ninja Express for the WWC Caribbean Tag Team Championship in Dorado on April 2, their opponents having won them the previous night in San Juan. Shortly after winning the belts, the Battens began feuding with The Puerto Rican Express (Hurricane Castillo, Jr. and Miguelito Perez). On April 29, a title bout between the two teams in Carolina ended in controversy and the championship was declared held up by the promotion. The Batten Twins regained the title in a rematch on May 14, however, they ended up losing the belts to Castillo and Perez in Jayuya, Puerto Rico on June 9, 1989. The Battens would wrestle Castillo and Perez in over 40 times. Brad Batten named The Puerto Rican Express as the best tag team they had ever faced.

The tense relationship between the U.S. and Puerto Rican wrestling industries led the Battens to adopt a "rebellious" attitude towards Carlos Colón and other promoters. During their second Puerto Rican tour, The Battens wrestled in scaffold matches thirteen nights in a row. The brothers would become one of the biggest heel performers in the country during their three-year run.

=== World Championship Wrestling (1990, 1992) ===
Both of the Batten brothers worked in World Championship Wrestling, however, they mostly wrestled separately and as preliminary wrestlers. Brad wrestled three tag team matches on WCW television in the spring and fall of 1990. The first match was with Mark Kyle on the March 2nd edition of World Championship Wrestling wrestling against The Steiner Brothers (Rick and Scott Steiner). Six months later, Brad appeared on World Championship Wrestling (aired September 8) with Joe Barrett at the Georgia Mountains Center in Gainesville, Georgia against NWA Tag Team Champions Doom (with Teddy Long). His third and final appearance was on WCW Main Event (aired September 30) where he and Dave Diamond took on "The Nature Boy" Ric Flair and NWA Television Champion Arn Anderson at the Cobb County Civic Center in Marietta, Georgia. Batten's team lost the match when Anderson hit Batten with a spinebuster and Flair forced him to submit to the figure-four leglock. On March 7, 1992, on WCW Power Hour Bart Batten wrestled "Flying" Brian Pillman. The Batten Twins first and only appearance as a team was on the March 22nd edition of WCW Main Event at the Civic Center in Anderson, South Carolina against Dustin Rhodes and Barry Windham. The Battens lost when Rhodes pinned one of the twins with his bulldog finisher.

=== Smoky Mountain Wrestling (1992–1993) ===
With the demise of the NWA territories, The Battens found a home in Smoky Mountain Wrestling. They were among the teams to enter the championship tournament in Harrogate, Tennessee to crown the inaugural SMW Tag Team Champions but were defeated by The Heavenly Bodies (Stan Lane and Tom Prichard) in the opening round. Bart Batten also fell victim to "Hollywood" Bob Holly's undefeated streak in a singles match the following week. The brothers defeated The Heavenly Bodies via disqualification a month later in Beckley, West Virginia. Their opponents held on to the belts, however, as titles could not change hands by disqualification. Over the next few weeks The Battens racked up victories on SMW television defeating Joe Cazana & Scott Sandlin in Spartanburg, South Carolina and Dutch Mantel & Jimmy Golden in Tazwell, Virginia. They were unable win the tag titles from The Heavenly Bodies in subsequent rematches. On the May 25 episode of Smoky Mountain Wrestling (aired June 20), the Battens told Bob Caudle in a TV interview that the team would temporarily stop pursuing the tag team champions so that The Fantastics (Bobby and Jackie Fulton) could have a title shot now that Jackie Fulton had recovered from a recent injury.

The 4th of July edition of Smoky Mountain Wrestling in Cumberland, Kentucky saw a match between The Batten Twins and Dixie Dynamite & Danny Davis end in a no contest when a backstage brawl involving The Heavenly Bodies and The Fantastics disrupted the bout. The following week saw Bart Batten team up with SMW Heavyweight Champion Brian Lee against The Dirty White Boy and "Mr. Wonderful" Paul Orndorff. Lee replaced one of the Battens following an injury and were awarded the match by disqualification. On August 10, the Battens lost to The Studd Stable (Jimmy Golden and Robert Fuller) at Polk High School in Benton, Tennessee.

On the January 30, 1993 episode of Smoky Mountain Wrestling, Brad Batten was the opponent selected to wrestle fellow "fan favorite" Tracy Smothers for the SMW "Beat The Champ" Television Championship; his name was drawn from a hat by Dutch Mantell at the beginning of the program. The Batten Twins made their final SMW appearance losing to The Studd Stable in Newton, North Carolina on February 7. The team lost the match when Fuller made one of the twins submit to a surprise "Fuller leglock" (Inside toe hold leglock). This was the first time the move had been used in the promotion. Bart Batten returned to Newton the following week to face Kevin Sullivan in a singles match. When Sullivan and his partner The Nightstalker began attacking Batten prior to the match, and Sullivan using a metal spike to stab him, Brian Lee and Tim Horner came to Batten's rescue.

=== Return to Puerto Rico (1993) ===
The Battens were working only part-time in SMW in the early-1990s and, as there were very limited spots in its tag team division, they decided to go on another tour of Puerto Rico with the World Wrestling Council. They captured the WWC Tag Team Championship from The Latin Connection (Ray González and Ricky Santana) in March 1993. On April 2, they jumped to rival Americas Wrestling Federation where they won the promotion's vacant tag team championship and held the belts until the AWF's close in June 1993. On December 3, 1993, wrestling as "The Wild Angels", the Batten's defeated The Fantastics for Big Time Wrestling's Ohio Tag Team Championship.

=== Smoky Mountain Wrestling (1994–1995) ===
The Batten Twins returned to SMW in early 1994. Their first match back was against The Moondogs (Moondog Rex and Moondog Spot) in Red Jacket, West Virginia which ended in a double countout. A rematch was held the next night in Hickory, North Carolina, which The Batten Twins lost. They suffered several more defeats at the hands of The Thrillseekers (Chris Jericho and Lance Storm) over the summer. On April 20, 1995, they got a shot at the then reigning SMW Tag Team Champions The Dynamic Duo (Al Snow and Unabomb) in Ashland, Kentucky, and the following night in Spencer, West Virginia, but came up short both times.

=== Independent circuit (1996–2001) ===
The Batten Twins continued wrestling on the independent circuit after SMW folded. On May 31, 1997, the Battens lost to Terminal Punishment (Allan Funk and Gregg Anderson) in Lorain, Ohio. On August 3, they wrestled Little Guido and Tracy Smothers at a Cleveland All-Pro Wrestling show at Turner's Hall in Cleveland, Ohio. The Batten Twins also defeated Beau James and Frank Murdoch for the Championship Pro Wrestling tag team titles that summer. During this time, the Battens had several run ins with Death & Destruction (Frank "The Tank" Parker and "Ruthless" Roger Anderson). A few days after winning the CPW Tag Team Championship, they beat Mountain State Wrestling Association tag champions Death & Destruction in a non-title match.

The Battens also occasionally wrestled for Ian Rotten's IWA Mid-South promotion in Louisville, Kentucky. On September 11, The Batten Twins lost to Shark Boy and The Tower Of Doom. A week later, however, they avenged this loss in a Three-Way Dance with American Kickboxer and Tarek the Great. On November 1, The Battens defeated Dark Overlord and Gatekeeper in New Martinsville, West Virginia to become the first Atlantic Coast Championship Wrestling Tag Team Champions. They lost the title to The Country Cousins (Cousin Elmer and R.J. Stomper) and failed to regain the belts in a rematch held in Buckhannon, West Virginia on December 13, 1997. On May 9, 1998, The Battens and The Bushwhackers headlined a show held at Riverside High School in Ellwood City, Pennsylvania.

They also worked for the Appalachia Pro Wrestling, where they encountered rivals Death & Destruction, and Nationwide Championship Wrestling where they won the NCW Tag Team Championship. In April 2001, The Batten Twins wrestled John Noble and Stan Lane in Hardeeville, South Carolina. Noble counted his matches with The Battens among the favorites of his career. The brothers also assisted promoter Scotty Ace produce NCW's weekly television show. They were living in Huntington, West Virginia at the time and had to travel the furthest of the entire roster.

That same year, The Batten Twins appeared on an episode of The Jerry Springer Show posting as brothers who were secretly dating a woman unaware that they were identical twins. They were among several Southern independent wrestlers used as "guests" for the show.

=== Southern States Wrestling (2001–2003) ===
The Batten Twins began competing for Southern States Wrestling based in Kingsport, Tennessee. On March 20, 2001, they beat Beau James and K. C. Thunder for the SSW Tag Team Championship. Aligned with Scotty Ace, the Battens continued feuding with James and Thunder throughout the year. At the second annual Mark Curtis Weekend of Champions, they defeated James and Thunder in a Steel Cage "loser leaves town" match thanks in part to outside interference from Scotty Ace and Ricky Harrison who "turned heel" by attacking his former allies. The Batten Twins lost the belts to The Heartbreakers (Andy Douglas and Kelly Charles) on June 1 but regained them two months later. The team defended the NCW and SSW Tag Team Championships while competing in both promotions. On September 3, they successfully defended both belts against Jimmy Valiant and Flex Armstrong at an NCW show in Huntington, West Virginia.

Their feud with K. C. Thunder continued into the fall. On October 13, The Batten Twins and their allies Ricky Harrison and Scotty Ace were beaten in an 8-man tag team match against Beau James, KC Thunder, PJ Sharp and Steve Flynn; the brothers had also defended their NCW/SSW titles against Ray Idol and Tony Givens that same night. They remained champions for only two more weeks when they were defeated in Kingsport by K. C. Thunder and Steve Flynn on October 27, 2001.

=== Independent circuit (2002) ===
In 2002, The Battens began wrestling for the Mid-South Wrestling Alliance out of Oak Hill and Blue Ridge Wrestling out of Princeton, West Virginia, alongside another former SMW veteran "Player" Brian Logan. On August 3, 2002, The Batten Twins lost to Death & Destruction at a Mason-Dixon Wrestling show for the Blackberry Festival in Nutter Fort, West Virginia. The two teams met again in Williamson, West Virginia three months later where The Batten Twins defeated Death & Destruction following a wild 4-way brawl. On August 15, they defeated the "New" West Virginia Wrecking Crew (Danny Ray and Scott McComas) in a tournament final to become the first-ever MSWA Tag Team Champions. The Batten Twins retained the title against The Rebel and Jamie Bolen in Marsh Fork on September 7 but they were stripped of the titles on October 19, 2002, when they failed to appear for a scheduled title defense in Smithers, West Virginia.

=== Southern States Wrestling (2003) ===
The Battens won the SSW Tag Team Championship for a third and final time when they beat Thorn and Tim Baldwin in Kingsport on March 22, 2003. At the two-day Mark Curtis Weekend of Champions, Bart Batten defeated Thorn in a singles match by disqualification and later on the team retained their title against Thorn and Flex Armstrong. After a near nine month title reign, the Battens dropped the belts back to Thorn and Baldwin on September 3. The following night, Brad Batten defeated Jesse Taylor for the SSW Heavyweight Championship. He decided to forfeit the title and officially surrendered the belt to promoter Beau James a month later. In one of his last SSW appearances, Brad Batten joined Ray Idol and Jimmy Golden in a 6-man tag team match to beat K. C. Thunder, Nightmare and Super Destroyer in Greeneville, Tennessee on September 20, 2003.

=== Independent circuit (2003–2004) ===
By the early-2000s, for the most part, The Batten Twins stayed within West Virginia working for local independent promotions such as American International Wrestling, Independent Pro Wrestling, Mid South Wrestling Alliance, Mountain State Wrestling, Mountaineer Pro Wrestling and Nationwide Championship Wrestling. They trained future NWA star Jason "The Gift" Kincaid during this time.

They did, however, travel to Ashland, Kentucky on May 23, 2003, to take part in a benefit show for the family of Tyler Dietrich who were struggling to pay expensive medical bills after their young son was diagnosed with cancer. This One's For Tyler involved wrestlers from seven different independent promotions including Nationwide Championship Wrestling and Ohio Championship Wrestling. The Batten Twins were part of a six-man tag match with Cuzin Elwood against The Poachers and Vic the Bruiser. On July 24, The Batten Twins lost to Mike Woods and Gary Valiant by disqualification at a NWA Main Event TV taping in Murfreesboro, Tennessee.

In January 2004, The Batten Twins briefly feuded with Jared and Bitch Lancaster in Mountain State Wrestling. On February 6, 2004, they fought to a double-disqualification against Johnny Blast and Cuban Assassin #2 in Minnora, West Virginia. A March 16 bout against The Memphis Mafia ended in a no-contest. Four days later, they won the West Virginia Tag Team Invitational in Smithers, West Virginia. On April 28, The Batten Twins were defeated by Eric St. Clair and George South in Fayetteville, West Virginia. On September 21, 2004, The Batten Twins defeated Lance Erikson and Stan Lee by disqualification at a MPW show in Oak Hill.

=== Retirement tour (2005) ===
In April 2005, the Batten Twins announced their retirement and would be going on one last wrestling tour throughout their home state of West Virginia. The reason behind their decision to retire was partly because the brothers "didn't want to be a Gypsy Joe" and risk serious injury due to their ages. Brad Batten had also met a woman in Cleveland, Ohio and wanted to move out of the state to live with her. The two were married three years later. On May 21, 2005, The Batten Twins wrestled their last match with Bart's son, Brent Batten, defeating "Superstar" Shane Matthews, Chris Vega and J.V. Insanity in Bradley, West Virginia.

== Post-retirement ==
While his brother left for Cleveland, Bart continued to be involved in the local independent circuit. He was the color commentator for the Bluefield, West Virginia-based All Pro Wrestling and hosted Network West Virginia's Monday night show Mountain State Wrestling TV. On July 5, 2014, Bart Batten appeared with fellow Smokey Mountain Wrestling alumni Bobby Blaze, Jim Cornette and Mick Foley for Bluegrass Championship Wrestling's "Rumble on the River" show in Ashland, Kentucky.

Brad Batten left West Virginia after retiring from pro wrestling. He later settled in Crestline, Ohio where he lived with his wife for several years. Batten died at the Ohio State University Medical Center on November 18, 2014, after suffering a sudden heart attack near his home. The news was announced by the World Wrestling Council on its official Facebook page.

On January 21, 2015, Bart Batten was a guest on the World Domination with Terry Garvin Simms podcast with retired wrestler Terry Simms. He discussed his reaction to Brad's death and revealed that both of them had become born again Christians after they had split up. It was not until Bart Batten called up his brother that he discovered they had unknowingly done so on exactly the same day. Bart talked about training with the Poffo family in ICW and their NWA career during the 1980s wrestling boom. He was also very critical of the modern wrestling industry and blamed Vince McMahon for "destroying the [NWA] territories". Both Garvin and Downtown Bruno have maintained that the Battens would have been major stars had they been given the opportunity by the bigger territories.

Bart Batten married his wife, Tama, on March 20, 2015, and retired with her to Stambaugh, Kentucky. He wrestled his final match on November 3, 2018, at the Good Samaritan Church Community Center in Huntington, West Virginia, with local independent company Big Time Wrestling. Bart died at his home in Stambaugh, on October 1, 2026, at the age of 68.

== Championships and accomplishments ==
- Americas Wrestling Federation (Puerto Rico)
  - AWF World Tag Team Championship (1 time)
- Atlantic Coast Championship Wrestling
  - ACCW Tag Team Championship (1 time)
- Central States Wrestling
  - NWA Central States Tag Team Championship (3 times)
- Big Time Wrestling
  - BTW Ohio Tag Team Championship (1 time)
- Championship Pro Wrestling
  - CPW Tag Team Championship (1 time)
- Mid South Wrestling Alliance
  - MSWA Tag Team Championship (1 time)
- Nationwide Championship Wrestling
  - NCW Tag Team Championship (1 time)
- Pro Wrestling Illustrated
  - PWI ranked Bart Batten # 336 of the 500 best singles wrestlers of the PWI 500 in 1992
  - PWI ranked Brad Batten # 327 of the 500 best singles wrestlers of the PWI 500 in 1992
- Southern States Wrestling
  - SSW Tag Team Championship (3 times)
- World Wrestling Council
  - WWC Tag Team Championship (4 times)
  - WWC Caribbean Tag Team Championship (2 times)

=== Bart Batten ===
- Central States Wrestling
  - NWA Central States Tag Team Championship (1 time) – Rick McCord
- International Championship Wrestling
  - ICW United States Tag Team Championship (1 time) – with Johnny Wilhoit
- Nationwide Championship Wrestling
  - NCW Mid American Championship (1 time)

=== Brad Batten ===
- Central States Wrestling
  - NWA Central States Tag Team Championship (1 time) – Bobby Jaggers
- Southern States Wrestling
  - SSW Heavyweight Championship (1 time)
