= ICW United States Heavyweight Championship =

Professional wrestling championship

Details
- Promotion: International Championship Wrestling
- Date established: 1981
- Date retired: 1983
Statistics
- First champion: The Sheik
- Most reigns: The Sheik, Pez Whatley and Paul Christy (2 reigns)
- Longest reign: Uncertain (Note: Due to gaps in the championship history it is impossible to determine this.)
- Shortest reign: Uncertain
- Oldest champion: The Sheik (57 years, 357 days approximately)
- Youngest champion: Pez Whatley (31 years, 355 days approximately)
- Heaviest champion: (Note: Documentation of the billed weight of 60% of the champions has not been found.)
- Lightest champion

The ICW United States Heavyweight Championship was a secondary singles championship in International Championship Wrestling. The title was created when The Sheik brought the now-defunct Detroit version of the NWA United States Heavyweight Championship to the promotion, making the Sheik the first ICW United States Heavyweight Champion. Because the championship is a professional wrestling championship, it is not won or lost competitively but instead by the decision of the bookers of a wrestling promotion. The championship is awarded after the chosen wrestler "wins" a match to maintain the illusion that professional wrestling is a competitive sport.

== Title history ==
Key
No.	Overall reign number
Reign	Reign number for the specific champion
Days	Number of days held

No.	Champion	Championship change			Reign statistics		Notes	Ref.
No.	Champion	Date	Event	Location	Reign	Days	Notes	Ref.
1	The Sheik	1981	N/A	(Note: The location of the match was not captured as part of the championship documentation.)	1	(Note: Neither the date the title was won or lost has been documented, making it too uncertain to determine any length for this reign.)	Title awarded	
2	Thunderbolt Patterson	1982	ICW show		1			
3	The Sheik	1982	ICW show		2			
4	Ratamyus (Bill Howard)	December 7, 1982	ICW show		1			
5	Pez Whatley	1982	ICW show		1			
6	Paul Christy	1982	ICW show		1			
7	Pez Whatley	1983	ICW show		2			
8	Paul Christy	1983	ICW show		2			
—	Deactivated	1983	N/A	N/A	—	—	Championship was abandoned for undocumented reasons	
