= ICW United States Tag Team Championship =

Professional wrestling tag team championship

Details
- Promotion: International Championship Wrestling
- Date established: June 14, 1979
- Date retired: 1984
Statistics
- First champion(s): Lanny Poffo and George Weingeroff
- Most reigns: (As a tag team) Lanny Poffo and George Weingeroff (4 reigns) (As individual) Lanny Poffo (6 reigns)
- Longest reign: Lanny Poffo and George Weingeroff (681 days)
- Shortest reign: The Convertible Blondes(Rip Rogers and Ricky Starr) (3 days) (Note: Due to gaps in the championship history it is impossible to determine this.)
- Oldest champion: Tojo Yamamoto (55 years, 213 days approximately)
- Youngest champion: Lanny Poffo (24 years, 168 days)
- Heaviest champion: Jeff Sword (290 lb (130 kg))
- Lightest champion: Ricky Starr (205 lb (93 kg))

The ICW United States Tag Team Championship was the top tag team championship in International Championship Wrestling. Because the championship is a professional wrestling championship, it is not won or lost competitively but instead by the decision of the bookers of a wrestling promotion. The championship is awarded after the chosen team "wins" a match to maintain the illusion that professional wrestling is a competitive sport.

== Title history ==
Key
No.	Overall reign number
Reign	Reign number for the specific champion
Days	Number of days held

No.	Champion	Championship change			Reign statistics		Notes	Ref.
No.	Champion	Date	Event	Location	Reign	Days	Notes	Ref.
1	Lanny Poffo and George Weingeroff	June 14, 1979	ICW show	Salt Lake City, Utah	1	681	Won a tournament to become the first champions.	
2	The Devil's Duo (Jeff Sword and Doug Vines)	April 25, 1981	ICW show	Lexington, Kentucky	1	141		
3	Lanny Poffo and George Weingeroff	May 14, 1981	ICW show	(Note: The location of the match was not captured as part of the championship documentation.)	2	5		
4	The Devil's Duo (Jeff Sword and Doug Vines)	May 19, 1981	ICW show		2	27		
5	Lanny Poffo and George Weingeroff	June 15, 1981	ICW show	Owenton, Kentucky	3	(Note: The date that the championship was lost has not been found documented which means the title reign lasted between 1 day and 199 days.)		
6	The Convertible Blondes (Rip Rogers and Ricky Starr)	July 4, 1981	ICW show		1	(Note: Neither the date the title was won or lost has been documented, making it too uncertain to determine any length for this reign.)		
7	Lanny Poffo and George Weingeroff	July 7, 1981	ICW show		4			
8	The Devil's Duo (Jeff Sword and Doug Vines)	October 10, 1981	ICW show	Symsonia, Kentucky	3			
Championship history is unrecorded from October 1981 to December 1981.
—	Vacated	December 31, 1981	—	—	—	—	Championship vacated, reason undocumented	
Championship history is unrecorded from December 1981 to May 1982.
9	Rip Rogers and Pez Whatley	May 1982	ICW show		1			
10	Lanny Poffo (5) and Mike Doggendorf	1982	ICW show		1			
11	Tojo Yamamoto and Gypsy Joe	1982	ICW show		1			
12	Lanny Poffo (6) and Mike Doggendorf (2)	1983	ICW show		2			
13	Tojo Yamamoto and Gypsy Joe	1983	ICW show		2			
14	Bart Batten and Johnny Wilhoit	1983	ICW show		1			
—	Deactivated	1984	—	—	—	—	Championship abandoned when ICW closed in 1984.	
