= ICW Heavyweight Championship =

Professional wrestling championship

ICW World Heavyweight Championship

Details
- Promotion: International Championship Wrestling
- Date established: May 10, 1978
- Date retired: 1984
Statistics
- First champion: Lanny Poffo
- Most reigns: Lanny Poffo (4 reigns)
- Longest reign: Uncertain (Note: Due to gaps in the championship history it is impossible to determine this.)
- Shortest reign: Uncertain
- Oldest champion: Paul Christy (44 years, 238 days)
- Youngest champion: Lanny Poffo (23 years, 133 days)
- Heaviest champion: Randy Savage (237 lb (108 kg))
- Lightest champion: Lanny Poffo (221 lb (100 kg))

The ICW World Heavyweight Championship was a professional wrestling world heavyweight championship of International Championship Wrestling. Many title defenses featured matches between Randy Savage and his real-life brother Lanny Poffo. After the original ICW shut down in 1984, Paul Christy started his own ICW promotion. The title history in 1979 is not clear. It is possible that Randy Savage won the title in July rather than on March 13. In addition, one source does not recognize the title changes between Savage and Poffo between this reign and 1982, as it claims that Savage won the title in 1979 and held it for over four years before dropping it to Christy. Because the championship is a professional wrestling championship, it is not won or lost competitively but instead by the decision of the bookers of a wrestling promotion. The championship is awarded after the chosen team "wins" a match to maintain the illusion that professional wrestling is a competitive sport.

== Title history ==
Key
| No. | Overall reign number |
| Reign | Reign number for the specific champion |
| Days | Number of days held |

| No. | Champion | Championship change | | | Reign statistics | | Notes | Ref. |
| No. | Champion | Date | Event | Location | Reign | Days | Notes | Ref. |
|---|---|---|---|---|---|---|---|---|
| 1 | Lanny Poffo | May 10, 1978 | ICW show | San Francisco, California | 1 | 307 | Defeated Joe Banek to become the first champion. | |
| 2 | Randy Savage | March 13, 1979 | ICW show | Halifax, Nova Scotia | 1 | 130 | May be for AGPW International Title; Savage may win the title in July 1979. | |
| 3 | Lanny Poffo | July 21, 1979 | ICW show | Lexington, Kentucky | 2 | (Note: Neither the date the title was won or lost has been documented, making it too uncertain to determine any length for this reign.) | | |
| 4 | Ron Garvin | January 12, 1980 | ICW show | (Note: The location of the match was not captured as part of the championship documentation.) | 1 | | | |
| 5 | Randy Savage | April 5, 1980 | ICW show | | 2 | | Sometime after March 8, 1980. | |
| 6 | Lanny Poffo | 1981 | ICW show | | 3 | | Sometime after August 8, 1980. | |
| 7 | Randy Savage | 1982 | ICW show | | 3 | | | |
| 8 | Paul Christy | November 13, 1983 | ICW show | Springfield, Illinois | 1 | 49 | | |
| 9 | Lanny Poffo | January 1, 1984 | ICW show | Springfield, Illinois | 4 | | | |
| 10 | Paul Christy | 1984 | ICW show | | 2 | | | |
| — | Deactivated | 1984 | — | — | — | — | Championship abandoned when ICW closed in 1984. | |
