= Lanny Poffo =

Canadian-American wrestler (1954–2023)

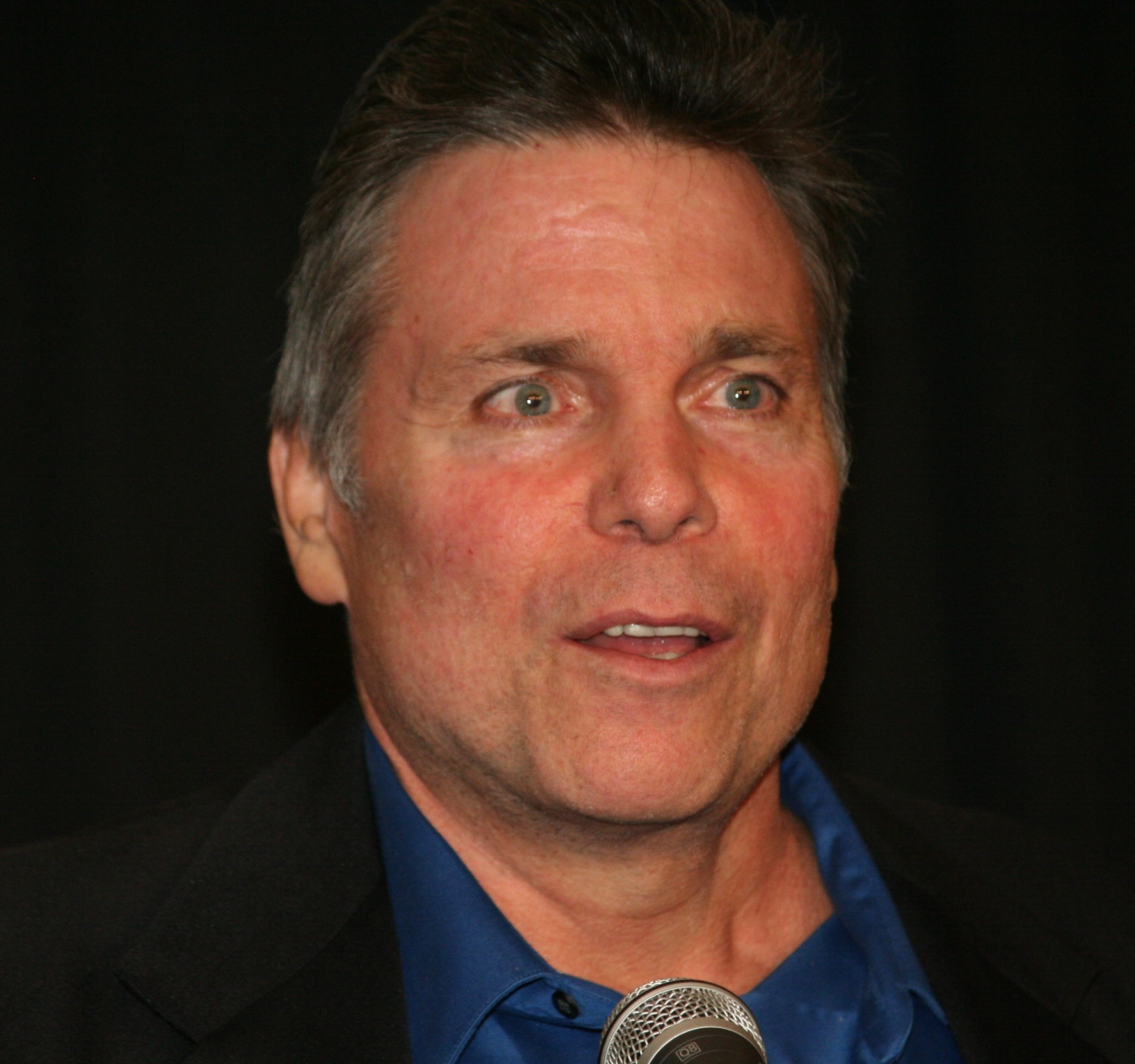
- Poffo in 2014

Personal information
- Born: Lanny Mark Poffo; December 28, 1954 Calgary, Alberta, Canada
- Died: February 2, 2023 (aged 68) New York City, U.S.
- Parent: Angelo Poffo (father)
- Family: Randy Savage (brother)

Professional wrestling career
- Ring name(s): The Genius ”Leaping” Lanny Poffo
- Billed height: 6 ft 0 in (183 cm)
- Billed weight: 236 lb (107 kg)
- Billed from: Downers Grove, Illinois Lexington, KY (1984)
- Trained by: Angelo Poffo
- Debut: 1974
- Retired: 2020

Lanny Mark Poffo (December 28, 1954 – February 2, 2023) better known by his ring names "Leaping" Lanny Poffo and the Genius, was a Canadian-American professional wrestler, motivational speaker, poet, and actor. Poffo was a second generation professional wrestler, his father being Angelo Poffo. His brother, "Macho Man" Randy Savage, was also a professional wrestler.

== Early life ==
Poffo was born in Calgary, Alberta, Canada, to Angelo Poffo, an Italian American Catholic, and Judy (Sverdlin) Poffo, a Jewish-American of Belarusian and Lithuanian descent. He was the younger brother of "Macho Man" Randy Savage and grew up in Downers Grove, Illinois.

== Professional wrestling career ==
=== Early career (1974–1979) ===
Poffo made his debut in 1974, losing to Wayne Cowan in the opening match of an All-South Wrestling Alliance card held in Atlanta, Georgia, on April 16. Poffo remained in the promotion for several months, defeating Cowan in a rematch and also gaining a win over The Great Fuji. On a card on July 9, 1974, in Atlanta he teamed with his father Angelo Poffo for the first time, defeating the veteran team The Royal Kangaroos.

Still in his rookie year, Poffo and his father then headed to Big Time Wrestling, one of the varied promotions affiliated with the National Wrestling Alliance at that time. In their initial match with BTW, Lanny and Angelo lost by disqualification to Lou Thesz and Mighty Igor on November 30, 1974, at a house show in Detroit, Michigan. They quickly began a house show series against the team of Bobo Brazil and Fred Curry. The two wrestled as heels, with Angelo Poffo wearing a graduation gown and cap similar to the attire Lanny later adopted in the WWF. That year they won the NWA World Tag Team Championship, and the father/son duo held it until 1975 with successful defenses over The Mongols and Brazil and Curry. While still tag-team champions, the Poffos moved on to the St. Louis Wrestling Club and continued to defend their championship. In 1975 they lost the title and returned to Big Time Wrestling.

1976 found Lanny wrestling primarily in singles matches in BTW, NWA Western States, and the St. Louis Wrestling Club. On May 29, 1976, Lanny received his first shot at the NWA World Heavyweight Championship, losing a televised match to Terry Funk on Wrestling at the Chase. He then defeated wrestlers such as Don Red Cloud, Raoul Guzman, and Gary Fulton. Lanny moved to Jim Crockett's Mid Atlantic Championship Wrestling in July 1976, and for the first time began teaming with his brother Randy Poffo (Randy Savage). The Poffo Brothers immediately began touring on the MACW house show circuit, defeating such teams as Johnny Eagle and Manuel Soto or Danny Miller and Johnny Weaver for the remainder of the year.

With his brother Randy having departed MACW after February, Lanny proceeded into 1977 as a singles wrestler once more. After gaining victories over George Rossi, Herb Gallant, and Leroy Rochester, Poffo gained another shot at the NWA World Heavyweight Championship when he faced off against Harley Race at an event in Chattanooga on February 4, 1978. This time Lanny wrestled the champion to a draw.

In April 1978, Poffo moved on to Emile Duprée's Atlantic Grand Prix Wrestling which had a weekly television spot on the Maritime region's CTV-affiliated ATV system and toured the Maritimes doing shows seven days per week with some days hosting two shows in two different towns. That year, he became the first ever AGPW International Heavyweight Champion. On May 23, 1978, he wrestled his brother (now known as Randy Savage) for the very first time, defeating him by disqualification at an event held in Truro, Nova Scotia. Savage later defeated his brother for the title, which they traded in 1978 and 1979. On July 18, 1978, their final title match ended in a draw at a show in Hartland, New Brunswick.

Poffo next moved to NWA affiliate Pacific Northwest Wrestling and made his debut on November 16, 1979, when he wrestled Kurt von Steiger to a draw at an event in Portland, Oregon. He faced a variety of opponents in PNW, including Adrian Adonis, Hiro Ota, and Tully Blanchard. On February 22, 1979, he unsuccessfully challenged NWA Pacific Northwest Heavyweight Champion Roddy Piper. Following a defeat to Gene Kiniski the next month, he departed the promotion.

=== International Championship Wrestling (1979–1984) ===
In 1978, Lanny's father Angelo founded International Championship Wrestling (ICW), an "outlaw" rival to NWA affiliates Southeastern Championship Wrestling and NWA Mid-America. Eventually Angelo further expanded and signed talent away from the World Wrestling Association and Jerry Jarrett's Continental Wrestling Association (CWA), forming a strong rivalry with the other territories. It was into the maelstrom that Lanny Poffo entered in the summer of 1979 as he jumped to his father's promotion. He became a star in ICW and eventually became the promotion's champion, where he wrestled with and against Randy Savage. The two brothers dominated the ICW Heavyweight Championship, and over the next six years, the only other wrestler to hold it was Paul Christy. Lanny remained a mainstay of the promotion until it folded in 1984.

=== Mid-South Wrestling (1984) ===
Shortly before the dissolution of ICW, Lanny began making appearances in Bill Watts' Mid-South Wrestling. His first matches came on October 12, 1983, when he defeated Art Crews and Doug Vines at a MSW television taping in Shreveport. In December he formed a team with Rick Rude and began a house show series with The Midnight Express that carried through January 1984. Lanny then moved back into singles competition and wrestled Buddy Landel in numerous matches.

=== Continental Wrestling Association (1984–1985) ===
On June 18, 1984, Lanny joined his brother Randy Savage who had jumped to the Continental Wrestling Association (CWA), defeating Bart Batten and Johnny Wilhoit at an event in Memphis. They almost immediately entered into a feud with The Rock 'n' Roll Express, a series that lasted throughout the summer. On October 1, 1984, he unsuccessfully challenged CWA International Heavyweight Champion Eddie Gilbert. That winter Poffo and Savage moved on to a house show series against Gilbert and Tommy Rich. In January 1985, they entered a tournament to crown the AWA Southern Tag-Team Champions, but were defeated by The Interns in the semi-finals. In the spring, they began a feud with AWA Southern Champions The Fabulous Ones, but were unable to capture the title. In June 1985, his brother departed for the World Wrestling Federation (WWF), and Lanny was soon signed to a contract there as well.

=== World Wrestling Federation (1985–1992) ===
==== "Leaping" Lanny Poffo (1985–1989) ====
Poffo debuted in the World Wrestling Federation (WWF) on June 21, 1985, at Madison Square Garden defeating Terry Gibbs. Although both Poffo brothers joined the WWF at the same point, their relationship was never acknowledged by the promotion. While Lanny was not a headlining WWF star like his brother, he initially built a niche for himself wrestling as a babyface. In his first role as "Leaping" Lanny Poffo, he would bring frisbees to the ring, read a short poem written on one of them that he himself had penned, and then throw the frisbees into the crowd. Each poem typically ridiculed the heel whom he was about to wrestle, or built heat in favor of the face with whom the heel was feuding at the time.

Lanny was initially undefeated in the WWF, defeating opponents such as Mr. X, Rene Goulet, Terry Gibbs, Barry O, and Moondog Spot. He suffered his first defeat on July 27 edition of Championship Wrestling, teaming with Keith Diamond in a loss to The Iron Sheik and Nikolai Volkoff. This presages a series of losses to Jesse Ventura, Big John Studd, and The Missing Link. During his early career in the WWF, he was not a main-eventer and wrestled primarily as enhancement talent on television shows. Rather than being squashed like most jobbers at the time, he displayed a greater amount of offense in his matches. He found great success on house shows, where he continued to defeat other undercard wrestlers. Poffo performed an agile, athletic, high-flying style at a time when big, heavy power wrestlers still dominated the promotion. He was one of the first wrestlers in North America to use moves like the Senton Bomb and the moonsault, though commentators of the time referred to the latter as a "leaping backflip".

He made his first Saturday Night's Main Event appearance on October 5, 1985, when he recited a poem at the wedding of Uncle Elmer. Entering 1986, he continued to be highly competitive against lower-level opposition, reeling off house show or televised victories over Terry Gibbs, Barry O, Rene Goulet, Tiger Chung Lee and S. D. Jones, between losses to Hercules, and Jim Neidhart. Lanny attained some infamy in late 1986 and early 1987 by competing in a series of Bunkhouse Battle Royals in full knight's armor. He also is noted for competing in a Battle Royal on Saturday Night's Main Event X at the Joe Louis Arena in Detroit in 1987, where he was headbutted (kayfabe) and eliminated by André the Giant, causing him to bleed heavily all over the floor and have to be carried out on a stretcher.

In February 1987, he participated in another famous angle, teaming with The Can-Am Connection in a six-man tag team match against "Adorable" Adrian Adonis and The Dream Team. During the match, Adonis accidentally cut the hair of Brutus Beefcake, leading to the latter's face turn and assumption of "The Barber" gimmick. Poffo and the Can-Ams won this WWF Superstars of Wrestling match by pinfall.

In January 1988, Lanny defeated Sika the Savage Samoan on a series of upsets, and during the following month he began a lengthy house show series with the newly heel-turned Dan Spivey. Poffo continued to receive a strong push against lower-level competition like Barry Horowitz, but was unable to break through as a top tier member of the roster. He entered a house show series with Jim Neidhart following the temporary dissolution of The Hart Foundation, but was unsuccessful in these contests. His fortunes changed somewhat later in the summer when he feuded with "Dangerous" Danny Davis on the house show circuit, pinning Davis on multiple occasions. Entering the fall of 1988 he faced numerous preliminary opponents and embarked on a lengthy winning streak, defeating Barry Horowitz, Sandy Beach, and George Skaaland. He continued to compete against opening card talent for the remainder of the year and was largely successful.

Poffo began 1989 with a loss to Iron Mike Sharpe at a house show on January 1 in West Palm Beach, Florida, and this was followed by a televised defeat on January 13 in Boston to The Brooklyn Brawler. After a smattering of wins, he then lost to Conquistador No. 1 on February 20, 1989, in Worcester, MA. These were followed by a pair of defeats to Tim Horner in March 1989.

==== The Genius (1989–1992) ====
On March 18, 1989, Poffo turned heel. He berated the local Boston sports teams, insulting them in his poetry, and instantly drew heat from the Boston crowd. He was subsequently reintroduced as "The Genius", a highly intelligent, arrogant heel who wore an academic cap and gown to the ring. After weeks of giving poetry as The Genius, he had his debut against Sonny Rodgers and defeated him. His poems now ridiculed the face wrestlers, and he adopted an exaggerated effeminate, showboating manner, similar to that employed by Gorgeous George, to draw heat from the crowd. He began a house show series against Jim Powers that spring and embarked on a lengthy winning streak. That summer he moved on to feud with Powers' former The Young Stallions partner Paul Roma and was also victorious. His first pinfall loss under his new heel persona came on August 12, to Koko B. Ware at a house show in Richfield, Ohio.

The Genius was featured on WWF Superstars during the coronation of Randy Savage as the new "King of the WWF"; Lanny read the proclamation for his real-life brother. He continued to win in his house show series with Koko B Ware and at the same time began to serve as "executive consultant" (and occasional tag team partner) for Mr. Perfect.

On November 5, 1989, at Saturday Night's Main Event XXIV, The Genius faced WWF World Heavyweight Champion Hulk Hogan and spent much of the match taunting Hogan and drawing heat from the crowd with his absurd antics. Several minutes into the match, Mr. Perfect appeared at ringside where he goaded Hogan and defaced the championship belt by sticking chewing gum on it. During the match, Hogan tossed The Genius outside the ring, subsequently Mr. Perfect attended to the Genius. Hogan followed him outside the ring, and then threw The Genius back into the ring. With Hogan's back to Mr. Perfect and the referee distracted, Mr. Perfect struck him with the championship belt, putting him down for the count out. Later in the show, Mr. Perfect and The Genius destroyed the stolen belt with a hammer. This was the first time in 21 months (since a loss to André the Giant at The Main Event) that Hogan lost on WWF television.

The Genius had his first televised defeat when he teamed with Mr. Perfect against WWF World Champion Hulk Hogan and WWF Intercontinental Champion Ultimate Warrior on the January 29, 1990 episode of Prime Time Wrestling. That winter he entered a house show series against Jim Neidhart and was generally victorious here as well. He made his first PPV appearance at the 1990 Royal Rumble and wrestled Brutus Beefcake to a double disqualification after "The Barber" began cutting his hair and Hennig interfered.

In March, The Genius lost at house shows to Jim Neidhart. He also teamed with Hennig in losing efforts against Hulk Hogan and various partners. At WrestleMania VI, he had his hair cut by Brutus Beefcake after Mr. Perfect was pinned. Shortly after WrestleMania VI, Bobby Heenan became Mr. Perfect's manager. The Genius then feuded with Brutus Beefcake and took to wearing wigs and amateur wrestling headgear to cover the haircut that "The Barber" had given him.

By the summer of 1990, The Genius had lost his feud with Beefcake and started to move back down the card. In June he renewed his house show series with Koko B. Ware; this time, "The Birdman" dominated on shows around the country. The feud continued through the summer and achieved national visibility on the August 27, 1990, edition of Prime Time, where Ware defeated The Genius on television. Poffo made a guest appearance on the October 13, 1990, episode of Saturday Night's Main Event XXVIII, participating in Oktoberfest activities along with The Hart Foundation, Jim Duggan, Mr. Fuji, and The Orient Express. That winter he engaged in opening match contests with Dustin Rhodes, Shane Douglas and Jim Brunzell.

After being on sabbatical for several months, The Genius returned in April 1991, wrestling Greg Valentine, Jim Duggan, and Bret Hart. He also participated in the joint WWF/SWS tour and faced Jim Powers on each show. On June 26, 1991, he scored a major upset victory in his comeback when he defeated Jim Duggan at a house show in Lansing, MI. On the September 7, 1991, edition of WWF Superstars he became the manager of The Beverly Brothers (Mike Enos and Wayne Bloom). Unlike during his time as Mr. Perfect's manager, he generally remained on the sidelines for much of the remainder of 1991 and wrestled very sporadically.

In December 1991, The Genius teamed with The Beverly Brothers in six-man matches against The Bushwhackers and Jim Neidhart. In the 1992 Royal Rumble, he managed The Beverly Brothers to a win over The Bushwhackers. He also continued to occasionally wrestle, and picked up a televised win over Brian Costello on the July 6 episode of Prime Time Wrestling and wrestled house show matches against Jim Brunzell, Virgil, and Bob Bradley. On the August 28 episode, he teamed with the Beverly Brothers in an unsuccessful effort against The Legion of Doom and Paul Ellering. At SummerSlam 92, the Beverlys lost to The Natural Disasters in a WWF Tag Team Championship. He continued to manage them until the 1992 Survivor Series before being released in December 1992.

=== Hiatus and WWF return (1993–1994) ===
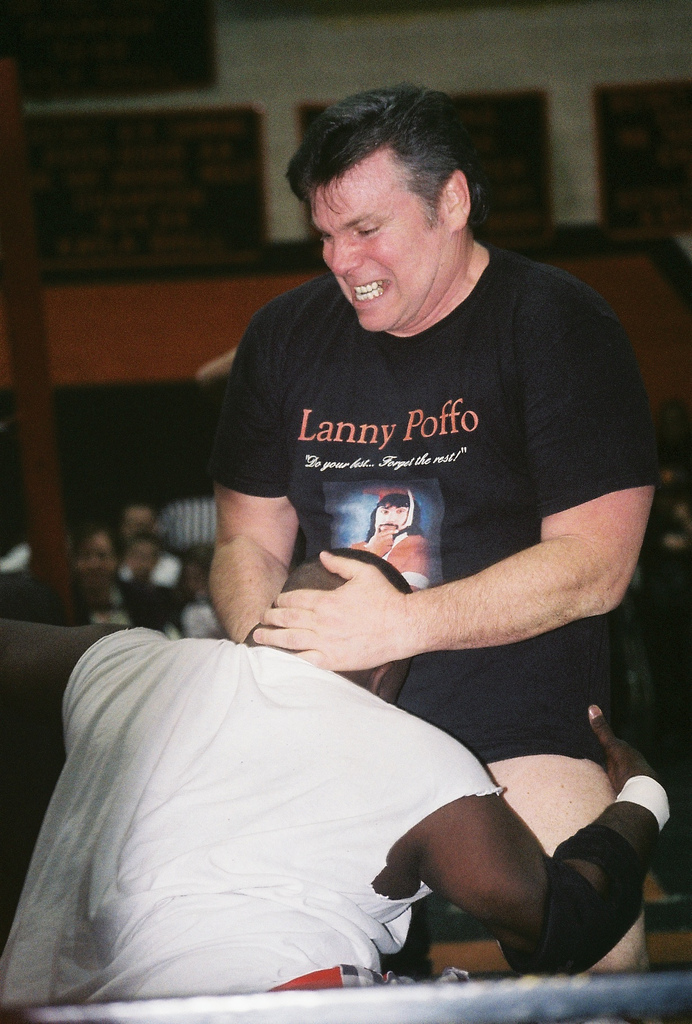
Poffo wrestling Koko B. Ware in 2010

After a six-month break, Poffo returned to action in June 1993 and joined World Wrestling Superstars on a tour of Germany where he was matched against Demolition Ax. He worked later that year for the International Championship Wrestling Alliance and wrestled Manny Fernandez, Jeff Bradley, and Brutus Beefcake. In December 1993 he appeared for Anvil Promotions and Johnny West, B. Brian Blair, and Al Hardimon. On March 12, 1994, he traveled to Brantford, Connecticut, to face The Warlord.

After a nineteen-month absence from the WWF, Poffo returned in May 1994, defeating Koko B. Ware on two house shows in Florida. His final WWF match was a loss to Mabel on June 11 at an event in Richmond, Virginia.

=== World Championship Wrestling (1995–1999) ===
Poffo signed a WCW contract in 1995, but may have wrestled only once during his time there (two sites record him as having defeated a preliminary wrestler in a dark match at a WCW Saturday Night taping on October 14, 1997, in Fort Myers, Florida). In a later shoot interview, Poffo explained that he was contacted by his brother (Randy Savage), who was wrestling in WCW at the time, with the guarantee of a contract. Savage, who had purchased the Gorgeous George gimmick, offered the character to Poffo, feeling that his brother would generate heat as a heel. Poffo signed the contract with WCW, began an intense training regimen, and bleached his hair blonde in preparation for his return to the ring. As he recalled, despite being under contract for five years and receiving regular paychecks, he was never contacted with any bookings. His own repeated calls to the office went unreturned, and he was simply never used by WCW. Ultimately, Savage gave the Gorgeous George moniker to his then-girlfriend and valet Stephanie Bellars.

=== Later career (2000–2020) ===
After a six-year sabbatical from professional wrestling, Poffo returned to be a part of Wrestle Reunion in Tampa, Florida, on January 28–30, 2005, and defeated "The Royal Stud" Adam Windsor at that event.

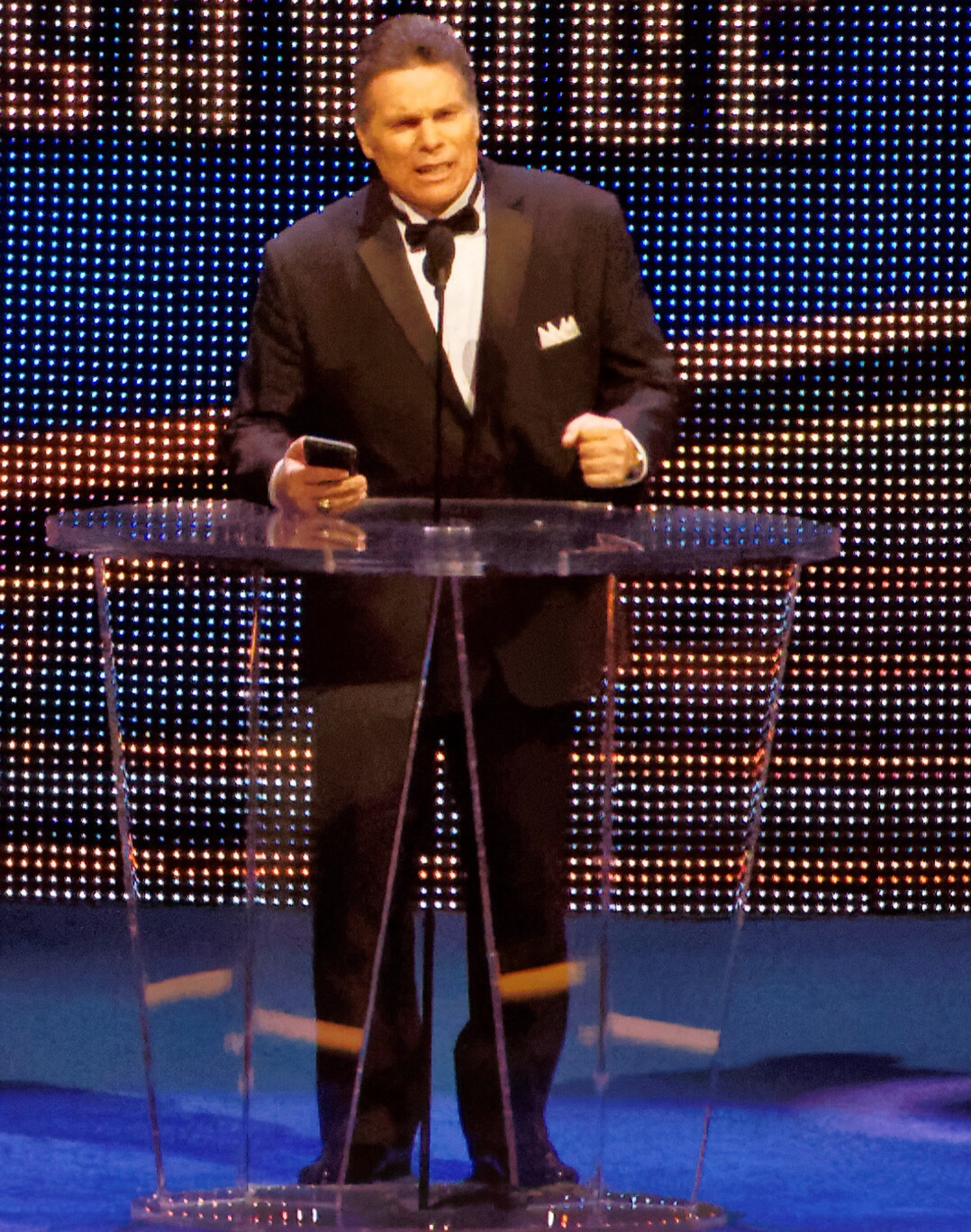
Poffo's Hall of Fame induction speech on behalf of his brother

He also wrestled in Canada as part of the Supershow later known as Great North Wrestling from 2007 to 2008 in Ottawa, Pembroke and Hawkesbury, Ontario. Later Great North worked in Thunder Bay in 2009 and New Brunswick in fall of 2010. Sometimes Poffo teamed with The Honky Tonk Man and feuded with Hannibal.

Poffo has toured the East Coast of Canada with UCW, wrestling in Prince Edward Island and Nova Scotia. After that tour, Poffo also wrestled in Poland and Florida, as well as a show in England.

On September 3, 2011, Poffo won a 25-man battle royal for the vacated Great North Wrestling Canadian Championship in Hawkesbury, Ontario. He dropped to title to Jeremy Prophet three weeks later in Perth-Andover, New Brunswick.

On May 6, 2012, in Reading, Pennsylvania, Poffo teamed with JD Smooth for a disqualification loss to "Pretty Ugly" in Regional Championship Wrestling's Rumblemania 8.

On March 28, 2015, Poffo returned to WWE at the 2015 Hall of Fame induction ceremony to induct his late brother, Randy Savage. He read poems and shared memories of Savage, before representing him the next day with the other inductees at WrestleMania 31

On September 1, 2018, Poffo appeared at All In in Hoffman Estates, Illinois, accompanying "Black Machismo" Jay Lethal as Lethal successfully defended the ROH World Championship against Flip Gordon. Lanny also appeared on ROH telecasts announcing the action, doing commentary from ringside using his extended vocabulary that he made famous during his Leaping Lanny days of the past.

Poffo wrestled his last match on March 5, 2020, at The Reena Rumble in Toronto, alongside wrestlers Papa Shango, Virgil, Brooklyn Brawler and local stars The Megan Boys Buck Gunderson and Mysterion the mind reader.

== Personal life and death ==
Poffo was married and had a daughter named Meghan from whom he had grandchildren.

Poffo began living in Ecuador in October 2020.

Outside wrestling, Poffo published two books. One is a collection of poems and limericks, most of which were related to drug and alcohol awareness, directed toward young children. Poffo was a vocal opponent of tobacco smoking and also published an anti-smoking book of limericks entitled Limericks from the Heart and Lungs! He appeared in infomercials as an endorser of Tony Little's Gazelle Freestyle exercise machine, and was a certified credit counselor and motivational speaker.

In March 2013, Poffo played a K9 police officer in the Investigation Discovery network's I (Almost) Got Away With It.

In 2018, Poffo released a biographical comic through Squared Circle Comics, titled The Genius Lanny Poffo.

On September 3, 2018, Poffo, alongside JP Zarka of ProWrestlingStories.com, launched a weekly podcast titled The Genius Cast with Lanny Poffo. The podcast featured 20 episodes, and ended its run on January 21, 2019.

=== Death ===
On February 2, 2023, Hacksaw Jim Duggan, a longtime personal friend of the Poffo family, revealed that Poffo had died in New York City at the age of 68. Dave Meltzer revealed the cause of death to be congestive heart failure.

== Championships and accomplishments ==
- Atlantic Grand Prix Wrestling
  - AGPW International Heavyweight Championship (1 time)
- Gulf Coast Championship Wrestling
  - NWA Gulf Coast Tag Team Championship (1 time) – with Randy Savage
- Great North Wrestling
  - GNW Heavyweight Championship (1 time)
- International Championship Wrestling
  - ICW Heavyweight Championship (3 times)
  - ICW Southeastern Heavyweight Championship (1 time)
  - ICW United States Tag Team Championship (5 times) – with George Weingeroff (3) and Mike Doggendorf (2)^{1}
- NWA Detroit
  - NWA World Tag Team Championship (Detroit version) (2 times) – with Angelo Poffo (1) and Chris Colt (1)
- NWA Mid-America
  - NWA Mid-America Heavyweight Championship (1 time)
  - NWA Mid-America Tag Team Championship (1 time) – with Bobby Eaton
- Pro Wrestling Lachine
  - PWL International Championship (1 time)
- Pro Wrestling Illustrated
  - PWI ranked him #229 of the top 500 singles wrestlers in the "PWI 500" 1991
  - PWI ranked him #426 of the top 500 singles wrestlers during the "PWI Years" in 2003

^{1}The ICW United States Tag Team Championship is referred to as the ICW World Tag Team Championship in some publications.

== See also ==
- List of Jewish professional wrestlers
