= International Championship Wrestling =

Professional wrestling promotion active from 1978 to 1984

- Acronym: ICW
- Founded: 1978
- Defunct: 1984
- Style: American Wrestling
- Headquarters: Lexington, Kentucky, U.S.
- Founder: Angelo Poffo
- Owner(s): Angelo Poffo (1978–1984); World Wrestling Entertainment (2023–present)
- Parent: WWE Libraries (WWE) (2023–present)

International Championship Wrestling was an independent professional wrestling promotion based in Lexington, Kentucky, which operated from 1978 until 1984. It was run by Angelo Poffo, the father of Randy Savage and "The Genius" Lanny Poffo. Throughout its history, ICW was considered an "outlaw" promotion, as it was not a member of the National Wrestling Alliance and promoted shows in direct competition against NWA regional territories. The rights to the ICW library are currently owned by WWE.

== History ==
The promotion was founded in 1978 as a rival to Ron Fuller's Southeastern Championship Wrestling and Nick Gulas's NWA Mid-American territory, extending into Verne Gagne's American Wrestling Association and Dick Afflis' World Wrestling Association territories by 1981. Later on they'd come in direct competition with Jerry Lawler and Jerry Jarrett's Continental Wrestling Association as well, operating in their territories and even managed to get several wrestlers to leave Southeastern and the CWA to join ICW. This, among other issues, would result in a series of lawsuits between Poffo and NWA-affiliated organizations during the late 1970s and early 80s.

The main stars of ICW were Poffo's sons Randy (better known as "Macho Man" Randy Savage) and Lanny (better known as "Leaping" Lanny Poffo) who frequently traded the promotion's heavyweight title between each other; in fact only two other men (Ronnie Garvin and Paul Christy) held the ICW Heavyweight Championship in the 6 years the title existed. While Randy and Lanny were the focus of the federation, it did feature many other stars such as The Original Sheik (Ed Farhat), Ronnie Garvin, Crusher Broomfield (later known as One Man Gang and Akeem), Bob Orton Jr., Bob Roop, Rip Rogers, "Pistol" Pez Whatley, Ox Baker, George Weingeroff, and the Devil's Duo (Jeff Sword and Doug Vines) with their manager Izzy Slapawitz.

Elizabeth Hulette, who would later gain fame in the WWF and WCW as Miss Elizabeth, got her start in professional wrestling as an on-camera host (using the name "Liz Hulette", as she was known to her friends while growing up) of ICW's weekly TV show where she also started her romance with Randy Savage. They were later married.

In 1984 the promotion closed down due to dwindling attendance and its assets were bought by Jerry Jarrett and Jerry Lawler. Due to the fans' knowledge of the extremely bitter rivalry between ICW and CWA, Randy Savage was able to migrate to the CWA and begin a memorable feud with Jerry Lawler that established Randy Savage as a world-class superstar.

In 2023, it was reported that WWE had purchased the ICW video library.

=== Same name, different promotions ===
Paul Christy, the wrestler who had ended Randy Savage's final reign as ICW World Champion, started a new ICW when Poffo's promotion folded. He ran the promotion for a few years with little publicity or success before closing it down in the late 1980s.

Another promotion called International Championship Wrestling operated out of Boston in the late 1980s, promoted by Angelo and Mario Savoldi, and Mario's son Joe Savoldi. After forming a working agreement with World Class Championship Wrestling, the Boston-based ICW was renamed International World Class Championship Wrestling (IWCCW). It included such stars as: The Russian Brute, Tom Brandi, Mike Kahula, Tony Rumble, and Nikolai Volkoff.

International Championship Wrestling (ICW) is also a lesser known promotion based in Cloverdale, BC. Past wrestlers include Buddy Wayne and Chico Alvarez.

== Tournaments ==
International Championship Wrestling held a variety of professional wrestling tournaments between 1980 and 1982 that were competed for by wrestlers that were a part of their roster.

=== ICW Television Championship Tournament (1980) ===
The ICW Television Championship Tournament was a single-elimination tournament to crown the first-ever ICW Television Champion. It was held in the fall, with the finals occurring on September 9, 1980.

Semifinals
1	Bob Roop
4	The Best
3	Randy Savage
2	Pez Whatley

Final
Bob Roop
Randy Savage

=== ICW U.S Tag Team Championship Tournament (1982) ===
The ICW U.S. Tag Team Championship Tournament was a one-night tag team tournament held in Johnson City, Tennessee on January 5, 1982, for the vacant ICW United States Tag Team Championship.

Quarterfinals
Rip Rogers and Pez Whatley
Apache Lou and Bill Martin
Gary Royal and Plowboy Pete
Crusher Broomfield and Rick Star
The Great Tio and Tony Peters
Ronnie Garvin and Chief Tapu
BYE
BYE

Semifinals
Rip Rogers and Pez Whatley
Crusher Broomfield and Rick Star
The Great Tio and Tony Peters
Lanny Poffo and Hoot Gibson

Final
Rip Rogers and Pez Whatley
Lanny Poffo and Hoot Gibson

== Championships ==
Championship:	Last Champion(s):	Active From:	Active Till:	Notes:
ICW World Heavyweight Championship	Paul Christy	May 10, 1978	1984	
ICW United States Tag Team Championship	Bart Batten and Johnny Wilhoit	June 14, 1978	1984	
ICW United States Heavyweight Championship	Paul Christy	1981	1984	
ICW Television Championship	The Great Tio	September 9, 1980	1983	
ICW Southeastern Heavyweight Championship	Lanny Poffo	May 26, 1979	1984	
ICW Southeastern Tag Team Championship	Bob Roop and Big Boy Williams	July 1979	August 1980	

== Alumni ==
=== Wrestlers ===
- Appolo Gold
- Barry O
- Bob Orton Jr.
- Bob Roop (Also worked as "The Best")
- Boris Malenko
- Buddy Landel
- Chief Tapu
- Crusher Broomfield
- Doug Vines
- Ernie Ladd
- Gary Royal
- George Weingeroff
- The Great Kabuki
- The Great Tio
- Izzy Slapawitz
- Jeff Sword
- Lanny Poffo
- MAX THUNDER
- Mike Doggendorf
- Mr. Wrestling I
- Angelo Poffo
- Ox Baker
- Paul Christy
- Pez Whatley
- Randy Savage
- Ratamyus
- "Hustler" Rip Rogers
- Ron "The One Man Gang" Garvin
- Ron Wright
- Super Duper Mario
- The Sheik
- Tojo Yamamoto
- Tony Falk
- Tony Peters
- Willie Monroe
- Jeff Turner Dr. X
- Sam Diamond (Spiderman)
- Bill Martin (1981 rookie of the year)
- Rick Conner
- Don Wright
- Hoot Gibson
- Devay Brunson
- Terry Gibbs
- Dennis Condrey
- Chief Black Eagle
- Masked Assassin
- Big Boy Williams
- Johnny Wilhoit
- Terry Harris
- Pamela Watson
- Julia "BlackWidow" Hoskins

=== Tag teams ===
- The Batten Twins – (Brad Batten and Bart Batten)
- The Convertible Blondes - (Pez Whatley, Rip Rogers and Gary Royal)
- Devil's Duo – (Doug Vines and Jeff Sword)
- The Samoans - (The Great Tio and Chief Tapu)

=== Announcers ===
- Tim Tyler
- Edgar Wallace
- Liz Hulette
- Robert Phillips Jr. (timekeeper)

=== Referees ===
- Sam Diamond aka Jack Barnett
- Jim Davis
- Emmitt Couch
- George Hill

== See also ==
- List of independent wrestling promotions in the United States
