= Paul Christy =

American professional wrestler (1939–2021)

Personal information
- Born: Paul Christerson; March 20, 1939 Chicago Illinois, U.S.
- Died: May 24, 2021 (aged 82)
- Spouse: Bunny Burmeister (m. 2006)

Professional wrestling career
- Ring name(s): Paul Christy; Billy Graham; Chris Lucas
- Retired: 1990

Paul Christy (born Paul Christerson, March 20, 1939 – May 24, 2021) was an American professional wrestler known mainly for his work in the National Wrestling Alliance and International Championship Wrestling as well as a stint in the World Wrestling Federation in the mid-1980s. Christy's wife, Bunny Burmeister, was also a professional wrestler and his manager, working under the name Miss Bunny Love. Christy and his wife both retired from the ring in 1990.

== Professional wrestling career ==
After graduating high school, Christy began working at American Health Studio. His manager Jack Thornton liked Christy's look and convinced him to wrestle one professional wrestling match. Christy won his first match, which was held at the Marigold Arena. Christy moved to Chicago and began working for Fred Kohler. He was voted Rookie of the Year by the fans in 1960.

Christy also worked for Dory Funk Sr. in Texas and for Mike DiBiase in Arizona. In Alabama, Christy formed a tag team with Ken Lucas, as his storyline brother Chris Lucas. The Lucas Brothers held both the Gulf Coast Tag Team title and Southern Tag Team title. After moving back to Chicago, Christy began working for the World Wrestling Association (WWA), where he held the WWA World Tag Team Championship with Wilbur Snyder, Moose Cholak and Roger Kirby. It was during this time that Christy met Bunny Burmeister and convinced Dick the Bruiser to let her act as his manager.

In the 1980s, Christy and Bunny worked for International Championship Wrestling (ICW), where they were billed as "wrestling's Bonnie & Clyde." In the ICW, Christy won the ICW Heavyweight Championship from Randy Savage. Following his run with the ICW, he worked for Vince McMahon's World Wrestling Federation as a jobber. Christy then semi-retired, working occasionally in Chicago as a villain.

== Personal life ==
Christy grew up around Chicago, Illinois and attended Mt. Carmel Catholic High School after receiving a swimming scholarship. He then transferred to Harper High School and began amateur wrestling.

Christy had retired and lived with his wife "Bunny Love" Burmeister in Three Rivers Michigan. He wrote a book detailing his wrestling career called The Many Faces of Paul Christy.

== Championships and accomplishments ==
- International Championship Wrestling

- ICW Heavyweight Championship (1 time)
- ICW United States Heavyweight Championship (2 times, last)

- National Wrestling Alliance

- NWA Southern Tag Team Championship (Gulf Coast version) (4 times) - with Ken Lucas
- NWA Gulf Coast Tag Team Championship (1 time) - with Ken Lucas

- World Wrestling Association

- WWA World Tag Team Championship (3 times) - with Wilbur Snyder (1), Moose Cholak (1) and Roger Kirby (1)

- Cauliflower Alley Club

- Other honoree (2005)
