= The Sheik (wrestler) =

American professional wrestler (1926–2003)

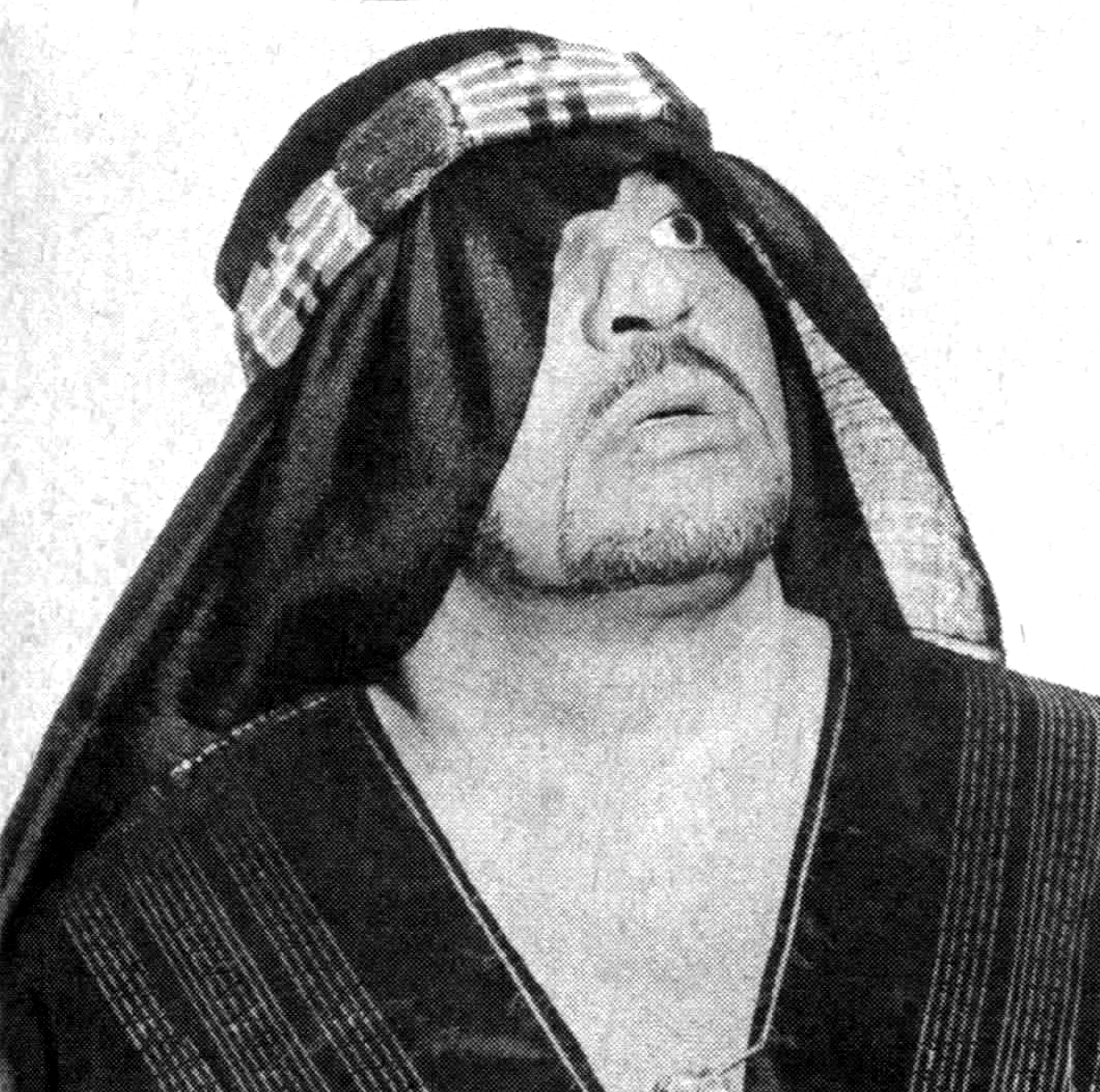
- Farhat, circa 1973

Personal information
- Born: Edward George Farhat; June 7, 1926 Lansing, Michigan, U.S.
- Died: January 18, 2003 (aged 76) Williamston, Michigan, U.S.
- Spouse: Joyce
- Children: 2
- Family: Sabu (nephew)

Professional wrestling career
- Ring name(s): Eddie Farhat; The Arabian Sheik; The Original Sheik; The Sheik; The Sheik of Araby
- Billed height: 5 ft 11 in (180 cm)
- Billed weight: 250 lb (113 kg)
- Billed from: "The Syrian Desert"
- Debut: 1947
- Retired: May 5, 1995 (final match); December 11, 1998 (retirement ceremony)
- Military service
- Allegiance: United States
- Branch: United States Army
- Service years: 1944–1946
- Unit: 13th Armored Division
- Conflicts: World War II; Central Europe

Edward George Farhat (June 7, 1926 – January 18, 2003) was an American professional wrestler, better known by his ring name The Sheik. In wrestling, Farhat, whose career debuted in 1947, is credited as one of the originators of the hardcore style, is also retroactively called The Original Sheik, mostly to distinguish him from the similarly named Iron Sheik who debuted in 1972.

In addition to his in-ring career, he was also the promoter of Big Time Wrestling, which promoted shows at Cobo Hall in Detroit until the 1980s, and was the booker for Frank Tunney's shows at Maple Leaf Gardens in Toronto from 1971 to 1977. Farhat is the uncle of Extreme Championship Wrestling alumnus Sabu, who he also trained.

== Early life ==
Edward George Farhat was born on June 7, 1926, to a Lebanese family in Lansing, Michigan. He was one of eleven children; unlike most of his older brothers, Edward did not attend college, though some sources erroneously report that he did. The confusion is likely the result of his similarly named older brother Edmund having attended college. Edward quit school in the eighth grade and worked odd jobs during the Great Depression. His family would find jobs in Michigan metal foundries and auto plants.

During World War II, he falsified his records in an unsuccessful attempt to join the United States Marines Corps while he was still underage, likely using his older brother Edmund's birth certificate. Edward would eventually be drafted into the United States Army in 1944, serving during the war. He was honorably discharged in 1946 after 18 months of service. After his family's employment background led to Army brass assuming Farhat to be a candidate for tank duty, Farhat was assigned to the 93rd Cavalry Reconnaissance Squadron of the 13th Armored Division. In January 1945, he managed to be transferred to Gen. George Patton's 3rd Army. Obtaining the role of an army technician, Farhat would complete military training at Camp Bowie in Texas in April 1945 and be transferred to Germany, where he drove a tank during the waning days of World War II.

Despite being portrayed as a foreign Arab Muslim in professional wrestling, Farhat was in fact a first-generation Lebanese-American who was born in the United States and also a Maronite Catholic.

== Professional wrestling career ==
=== Early career and cementing The Sheik gimmick (1947–1965) ===
After completing his service in the U.S. Army, Farhat competed in his first professional wrestling match in January 1947, wrestling as the clean-cut babyface "Eddie Farhat". Within a few years of his debut, Farhat would develop his "Sheik" gimmick, under which he would gain international fame. Farhat first started wrestling as The Sheik of Araby in the Chicago area, with the gimmick initially being that of a privileged son of a wealthy, aristocratic Middle Eastern family. As the Sheik of Araby, Farhat formed a tag team with Gypsy Joe, with the duo capturing the NWA Midwestern Tag Team Championship in 1954, before eventually moving to Texas. During this period, The Sheik received the biggest match of his career up to that point, when he was booked to face NWA World Heavyweight Champion Lou Thesz in Chicago for his title. Thesz, regarded in wrestling as a legitimate shooter, had a reputation for embarrassing "gimmick wrestlers" so The Sheik left the ring during the course of the match and hid under a bus in the parking lot. The incident received much coverage in local media and helped to push The Sheik character to a more prominent level. Following the incident, The Sheik began wrestling in New York City for Vincent J. McMahon at Madison Square Garden where he teamed with Dick the Bruiser and Bull Curry in feuds against Mark Lewin and Don Curtis as well as the team of Antonino Rocca and Miguel Pérez. On August 18, 1961, The Sheik was notably defeated by Buddy Rogers in a 2-out-of-3 falls match at the Cincinnati Gardens.

By the early 1960s, The Sheik's wrestling was centered on his character of an Arab wild man from Syria. Clad with his keffiyeh, before each match, he would use stalling tactics as he would kneel on a prayer rug to perform an Islamic prayer to Allah (in real life Farhat was a Maronite Christian). He would lock on choke holds and refuse to break them, and use a camel clutch hold leading to submission victories. The hold would have him sit over his opponent's back as he applied a chinlock. He used hidden pencils and other "foreign objects" to cut open his opponent's faces. Often, the tactic backfired and the opponent got hold of The Sheik's pencil, leading to the extensive blade scars on Farhat's forehead. Sheik's other signature illegal move was his fireball that he threw into his opponents' faces, sometimes burning their faces severely. The fireball move was performed through the use of lighter fluid soaked pieces of paper which he quickly lit with a cigarette lighter hidden in his trunks. The Sheik didn't speak on camera, apart from incomprehensible mutterings and pseudo-Arabic. The American born child of Lebanese immigrants in fact never learned Arabic. At the start of his career, his wife Joyce played the part of his valet Princess Saleema who would burn incense in the ring. Joyce would go on to play Princess Saleema for many years and, as a result of his gimmick requiring him not to not know the English language, also frequently accompany The Sheik to autograph signings, where she would speak to the fans on The Sheik's behalf and provide the autograph signatures. He had three different male managers during his career to cut promos on his behalf. His first manager was Abdullah Farouk but when Farouk moved full-time to the World Wide Wrestling Federation, Eddy Creatchman became his manager. When Creatchman was unable to work with him later in his career, The Sheik was managed by Supermouth Dave Drason, his final manager.

=== World Wide Wrestling Federation (1965–1972) ===
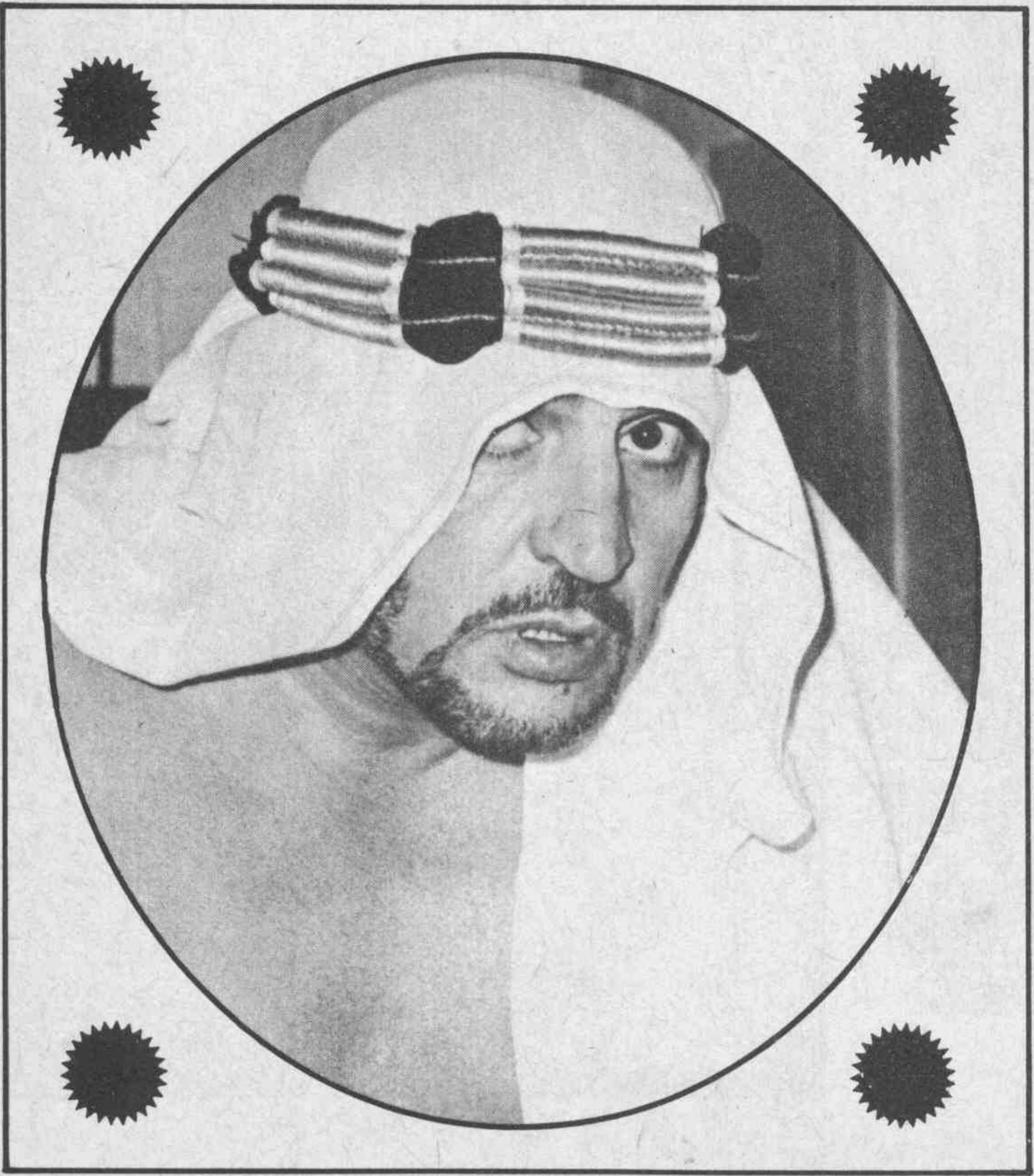
Farhat, circa 1973

In 1965, The Sheik made his return to the New York City area, competing for the World Wide Wrestling Federation (WWWF). On September 25, 1967, he wrestled former world champion Édouard Carpentier to a 20-minute draw. In 1968, he was back brought into the WWWF for title matches with then-WWWF World Heavyweight champion Bruno Sammartino. They met three times in Madison Square Garden – Sheik won the first match via count out on October 28, he lost via disqualification in the second match on November 18, and he lost to Sammartino in a Texas Death Match via submission on December 9, when Bruno grabbed a pen and attacked Sheik's arm until it was bloody. Sammartino and Sheik also had a series of matches in Boston in January and February 1969, including one on a sold-out event the day after a major snow storm; public transportation had yet to be restored in the Boston area but the event still sold-out. The two would later fight in three steel cage matches, one in Philadelphia and two in Boston. On November 18, 1972, The Sheik competed in his final match for the WWWF, losing to WWWF Champion Pedro Morales by count out at Boston Garden.

=== Feud with Bobo Brazil; Canada and Japan (1960s–1980s) ===
The Sheik's biggest feud was his nearly career-long conflict with Bobo Brazil, beginning in The Sheik's own Big Time Wrestling promotion in Detroit before expanding throughout the country. The two feuded over Sheik's version of the United States Championship, frequently selling out Cobo Hall. The feud was briefly covered in the wrestling mockumentary movie, I Like to Hurt People. Following their success at Cobo Hall, the two took the feud to several markets, most notably Memphis, Tennessee, and Los Angeles, California. His other major opponent in Los Angeles was Fred Blassie. Sheik and Blassie faced off several times, including cage matches in the Grand Olympic Auditorium. In 1967, The Sheik was wrestling a match in Texas when a fan pulled a gun and tried to shoot him three times. Fortunately, the gun didn't go off and the fan was arrested; the gun later fired when police tested it at a shooting range.

Starting in 1967, The Sheik began wrestling regularly in Toronto, Ontario, Canada, where he was undefeated for 127 matches at Maple Leaf Gardens. He defeated the likes of Whipper Billy Watson, Lou Thesz, Gene Kiniski, Bruno Sammartino, Édouard Carpentier, Ernie Ladd, Chief Jay Strongbow, Tiger Jeet Singh, Johnny Valentine, and even André the Giant during Andre's first extensive tour of North America in 1974. It was Andre who put an end to The Sheik's Toronto winning streak in August 1974 by disqualification. In 1976, he lost by pinfall to Thunderbolt Patterson and Bobo Brazil. Sheik continued to headline most shows in Toronto until 1977, but business dropped off significantly over the last three years of his tenure as headliner. In addition to wrestling in Toronto, The Sheik was the area's booker; due to the wrestling tradition of kayfabe, few fans were aware of the fact that he was actually the booker of Frank Tunney's Toronto promotion – a position he acquired following the retirement of Whipper Billy Watson in 1971. As business in Toronto failed, he began working for independent promoter Dave McKigney elsewhere in Ontario.

In 1972, The Sheik ventured to Japan for the first time, competing for the Japan Pro Wrestling Alliance (JWA). His JWA run was successful, but the promotion was struggling financially, so when the company went bankrupt, Sheik jumped to Giant Baba's All Japan Pro Wrestling (AJPW). He then jumped a year later to Antonio Inoki's New Japan Pro-Wrestling, but had a falling out with Inoki due to having to leave a Japanese tour early to deal with a "coup attempt" in his Big Time Wrestling promotion. He returned to AJPW in 1977, teaming, and then feuding, with Abdullah the Butcher. His match with Abdullah the Butcher against Dory Funk Jr. and Terry Funk where Terry fought off Abdullah and The Sheik with his arm in a sling is credited for turning the foreign Funks into faces in Japan. In Japan, he would also team with Baba, Ricky Steamboat, and Kintarō Ōki.

The Sheik's Japanese feud with Abdullah would later extend to the United States. A match between the two in Birmingham, Alabama, saw them brawl outside of the Boutwell Auditorium, where they held up traffic until the police broke it up. The match was described by observers as "just classic, bloody mayhem."

=== Later career (1980–1998) ===
In 1980, The Sheik's Detroit-based Big Time Wrestling promotion ceased operations. Sheik then wrestled for various independent promotions throughout the United States and overseas.

From 1991 to 1995, he mainly wrestled in Japan, alongside his nephew Sabu, for Frontier Martial-Arts Wrestling (FMW). FMW used the hardcore wrestling style that The Sheik had innovated and in FMW, he participated in various dangerous death matches. On May 6, 1992, The Sheik wrestled in a Fire Death Match with Sabu against Atsushi Onita and Tarzan Goto, where the ring ropes were replaced with flaming barbed wire. During the match, Sheik suffered third-degree burns and went into a coma, nearly dying. In 1994, he had a brief run in Eastern Championship Wrestling (ECW), where Sabu had a career, notably teaming with Pat Tanaka to defeat Kevin Sullivan and The Tazmaniac at The Night the Line Was Crossed. On May 5, 1995, at the FMW 6th Anniversary Show, The Sheik defeated Damián 666 in front of 58,250 fans; this ended up being his last match. Following the match, he suffered his first heart attack while attempting to board a taxi.

When Sabu joined World Championship Wrestling (WCW) in 1995, The Sheik accompanied him as his manager. During Sabu's match with Mr. JL at Halloween Havoc, The Sheik's leg was broken by the wrestlers during a spot he was previously unaware of, forcing him to finally leave the wrestling business. On December 11, 1998, the night before the ECW/FMW Supershow, Atsushi Onita held a retirement ceremony for The Sheik in Korakuen Hall, during which The Sheik, in his final public appearance, officially retired from professional wrestling at age 72.

== Personal life ==
Farhat was married to a woman named Joyce, who for many years served as his valet Princess Sheela and who even accompanied him to autograph signings in this role as late as 1993. The couple had two sons, Ed Jr. and Tom. His oldest son Ed wrestled for years as "Captain Ed George." However, he never hinted in his wrestling gimmick that he was related to The Sheik, and the fact that he was Farhat's real-life son was largely not known to wrestling fans during his career. He would personally train his nephew Terry "Sabu" Brunk, a son of one of Farhat's sisters who the Lansing State Journal noted in 2019 mostly "took on his uncle's identity" and carried Farhat's "legacy."

== Death ==
Farhat died of heart failure on January 18, 2003, at a hospital near his Williamston, Michigan, home. He was 76 years old (not 78, as erroneously reported) and was in the midst of writing his autobiography. He is buried at the Mount Calvary Catholic Cemetery in Williamston.

== Legacy ==
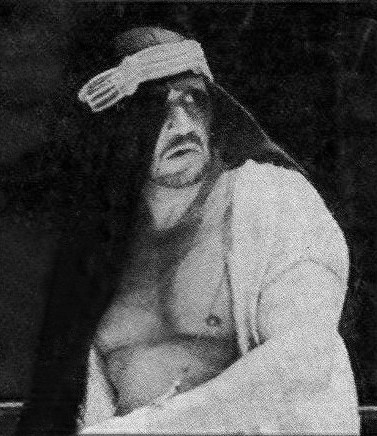
Farhat, circa 1972

During the course of his in-ring career, The Sheik was seen as one of professional wrestling's biggest box office attractions. He later became regarded as a pioneer of hardcore wrestling, a style which became a major part of mainstream American professional wrestling in the 1990s. On March 31, 2007, The Sheik was posthumously inducted into the WWE Hall of Fame by his nephew, Sabu, and Rob Van Dam, who he had trained. He is also credited with training Scott Steiner and independent wrestler "Machine Gun" Mike Kelly, among other students. Most notably, he and Freddie Blassie trained boxer Muhammad Ali before Ali's famous 1976 "boxer vs wrestler match" with Antonio Inoki in Tokyo.

As a promoter, Farhat developed a reputation for short-changing wrestlers and employees on pay. However, he would additionally become known as a benefactor to friends in need; according to Harley Race, after his wife died in an automobile accident and he was forced to take time off early in his career, The Sheik mailed him a check every week for a year until he could return to work.

His wife, and former valet, Joyce, died on November 27, 2013, in Michigan, after being ill for some time. She is buried with her husband at Mount Calvary Catholic Cemetery in Williamston, Michigan. He was also the uncle of Michael Farhat, who wrestled as "Mike Thomas" in Detroit. Thomas died in 1978 at age 27. The Sheik's son Tom died on October 2, 2020, from kidney cancer at 57, and his eldest son Ed Farhat Jr. — who wrestled under the ring name "Captain Ed George" — died from complications of COVID-19 on March 22, 2021, at the age of 70. His nephew Terry "Sabu" Brunk, who would more notably hone Farhat's wrestling craft and whose wrestling gimmick bore greater resemblance to that of Farhat's Sheik gimmick with things such as turban attire and having a refusal to speak on-camera, would also die in May 2025, two days before an episode of Dark Side of the Ring focusing on the Sheik aired in the United States.

In his later years, Farhat provided extensive interviews to a biographer with the intent of publishing a book on his life. These interviews provided a detailed non-kayfabe look into his career and character, which he previously took great effort in concealing from the public. Farhat had previously had a reputation for "living his gimmick"; he didn't answer promoter phone calls for "Ed", not even for potential bookings, telling the promoters "no Ed lives here". After his death, the interviews and draft of the book were sealed. A book about Farhat's life and career, titled Blood and Fire, was later released in April 2022 by ECW Press. Blood and Fire won the 2022 Wrestling Observer Newsletter Best Pro Wrestling Book award.

== Championships and accomplishments ==
- 50th State Big Time Wrestling
  - NWA Hawaii Heavyweight Championship (1 time)
- All Japan Pro Wrestling
  - World's Strongest Tag Determination League Outstanding Performance Award (1978) – with Abdullah the Butcher & Tor Kamata
  - World's Strongest Tag Determination League Exciting Award (1981) – with Mark Lewin
- Big Time Wrestling
  - NWA United States Heavyweight Championship (Detroit version) (12 times)
- Buffalo Athletic Club
  - NWA Midwestern Tag Team Championship (1 time) – with Gypsy Joe
  - NWA World Tag Team Championship (Buffalo Athletic Club version) (1 time) – with Gypsy Joe
- Cauliflower Alley Club
  - Other honoree (1995)
- Frontier Martial-Arts Wrestling
  - WWA World Martial Arts Heavyweight Championship (1 time)
  - United States Championship (1 time, inaugural)
- Great Lakes Wrestling Association
  - GLWA United States Heavyweight Championship (1 time)
- International Championship Wrestling
  - ICW United States Heavyweight Championship (2 times, inaugural)
- International Wrestling Enterprise (El Paso)
  - International City Tag Team Championship (1 time) – with Ali Bey
- International Wrestling Association (Montreal)
  - IWA International Heavyweight Championship (3 times)
- Japan Pro Wrestling Alliance
  - NWA United National Championship (1 time)
- Maple Leaf Wrestling
  - NWA United States Heavyweight Championship (Toronto version) (4 times)
- National Wrestling Alliance
  - NWA Hall of Fame (Class of 2010)
- NWA Hollywood Wrestling
  - NWA Americas Heavyweight Championship (2 times)
- Ohio Professional Wrestling Hall of Fame
  - Class of 2022
- Pro Wrestling Illustrated
  - PWI Most Hated Wrestler of the Year (1972)
  - PWI ranked him #368 of the top 500 singles wrestlers of the "PWI Years" in 2003
- Professional Wrestling Hall of Fame and Museum
  - Class of 2011
- Tri-State Wrestling Alliance
  - NWA United States Heavyweight Championship (Detroit splinter version) (1 time, inaugural)
- Western States Sports
  - NWA North American Heavyweight Championship (Amarillo version) (1 time)
- World Class Championship Wrestling
  - NWA Brass Knuckles Championship (Texas version) (1 time)
  - NWA Texas Heavyweight Championship (1 time)

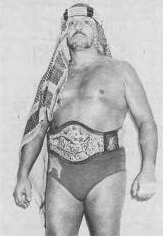
The Sheik as WWWF United States Heavyweight Champion

- World Wide Wrestling Federation/World Wrestling Entertainment
  - WWWF United States Heavyweight Championship (2 times)
  - WWE Hall of Fame (Class of 2007)
- Wrestling Observer Newsletter
  - Wrestling Observer Newsletter Hall of Fame (Class of 1996)
- Other championships
  - BTW United States Heavyweight Championship (1 time)
  - Midwest Heavyweight Championship (1 time)
  - Southern Heavyweight Championship (Louisiana/Mississippi version) (1 time)

== See also ==
- Big Time Wrestling

== Sources ==
- Birthday The Sheik Death
- Tributes II by Dave Meltzer, 2004, ISBN 1-58261-817-8, pp 83–93
