= Angelo Poffo =

American professional wrestler and the father of Randy Savage

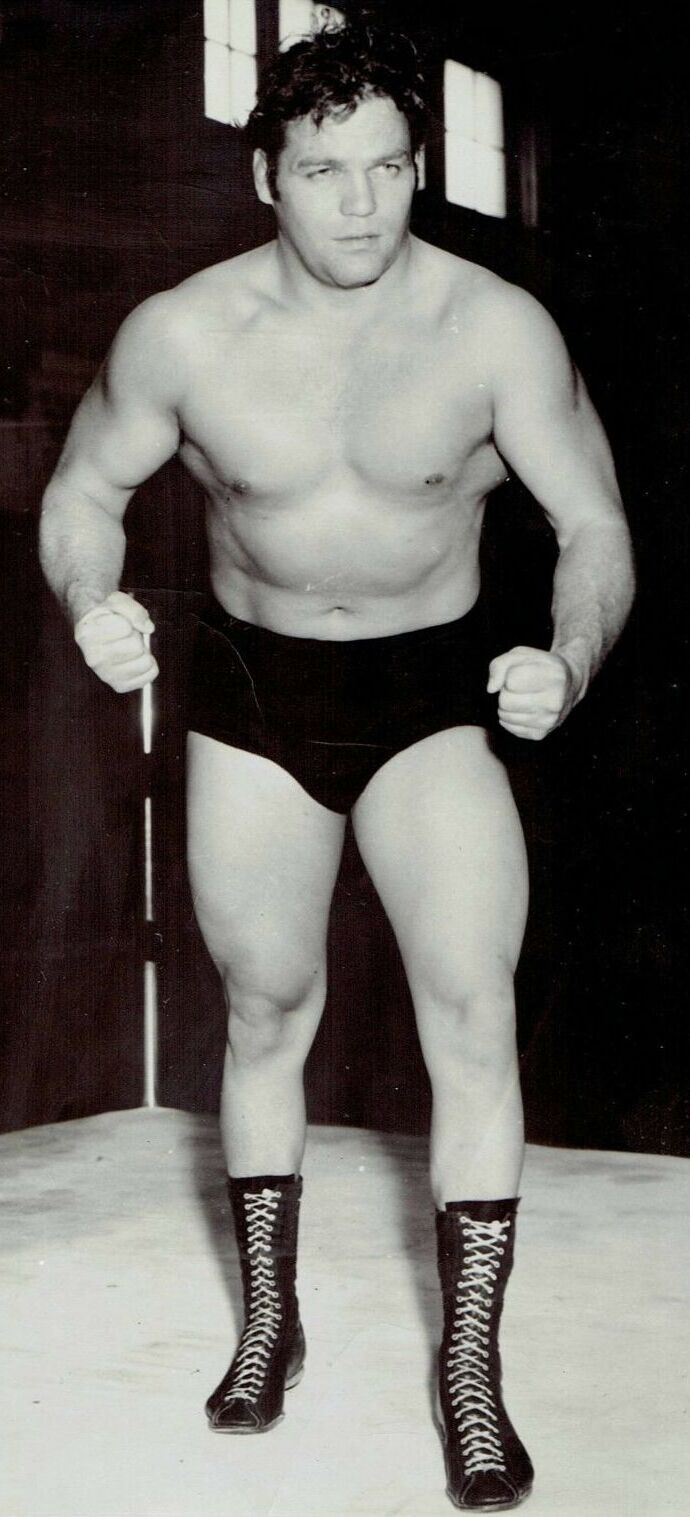
- Poffo in 1955

Personal information
- Born: Angelo John Poffo; April 10, 1925 Downers Grove, Illinois, U.S.
- Died: March 4, 2010 (aged 84) Sarasota, Florida, U.S.
- Education: DePaul University
- Spouse: Judith Sverdlin (m. 1949)
- Children: Randy Savage; Lanny Poffo
- Family: Miss Elizabeth (former daughter-in-law)

Professional wrestling career
- Ring name(s): Angelo Poffo; The Carpet Bagger; Masked Miser
- Billed height: 6 ft 0 in (183 cm)
- Billed weight: 200 lb (91 kg)
- Billed from: Chicago, Illinois
- Trained by: Karl Pojello
- Debut: 1948
- Retired: 1991
- Military service
- Allegiance: United States
- Branch: United States Navy
- Rank: Pharmacist's mate
- Unit: Naval Base San Diego
- Conflicts: World War II

Angelo John Poffo (April 10, 1925 – March 4, 2010) was an American professional wrestler and wrestling promoter. He ran International Championship Wrestling for a number of years, holding cards in Tennessee, Kentucky, and Arkansas. He is the father of "Macho Man" Randy Savage and "The Genius" Lanny Poffo and the father-in-law of Miss Elizabeth.

== Early life, family and education ==
Poffo was born in Downers Grove, Illinois (a suburb of Chicago), to Italian immigrants. At the time of beginning first grade, he spoke no English.

Poffo enlisted in the United States Navy during World War II. He served as a pharmacist's mate at Naval Base San Diego. While in the Navy, Poffo began weight training. On July 4, 1945, he set a world record for sit-ups. He completed 6,033 sit-ups in four hours and ten minutes. According to his son Lanny, after 6,000 sit-ups he did 33 more, one for each year of Jesus's life.

After leaving the Navy, Poffo attended DePaul University and was a catcher for the DePaul Blue Demons baseball team. He studied physical education and was a competitive chess player.

== Professional wrestling career ==
Poffo started wrestling in 1948 at Karl Pojello's gym in Illinois. His first match was in 1949 against Ruffy Silverstein. He sometimes wrestled as "the Masked Miser" (an in-joke about Poffo's real life extreme frugality with money) and managed other wrestlers as "the Miser". He became a villainous character for the first time in 1950. In the mid-1950s, Bronco Lubich acted as his manager. He won the NWA United States Heavyweight Championship (Chicago version) in 1958.

He formed a villainous tag team with Chris Markoff called "The Devil's Duo" in 1966, and they were managed by Bobby Heenan. Prior to that, in 1964 he briefly teamed with Nicoli Volkoff (often confused with Nikolai Volkoff, who did not begin wrestling in the US until 1970) and held the WWA tag team championship. In 1973, he formed the team "The Graduates" with Ken Dillinger.

Poffo wrestled in the 1970s and 1980s under a mask as the "Carpet Bagger" for Emile Dupree's Atlantic Grand Prix Wrestling in the Maritime Provinces of Canada. He also bought into the promotion, when his sons were old enough to join. He wrestled wearing a yellow mask with a dollar sign on the forehead and a blue sequined ring jacket with a big dollar sign on the back. In addition, Poffo ran International Championship Wrestling from 1979 to 1983 in Kentucky. From 1983 to 1985 he worked for Continental Wrestling Association.

According to Poffo's son Lanny, Vince McMahon declined to include Poffo in a 1987 World Wrestling Federation event featuring legends. Lanny Poffo claims that this decision caused an early rift in the relationship between McMahon and Poffo's other son, Randy Savage. His last match was in 1991 against Luis Martinez.

He made a few appearances in World Championship Wrestling (WCW) in 1995 managing his son, Randy Savage. At Slamboree '95: A Legends' Reunion, Poffo became involved in his son's feud with Ric Flair, who put him in a figure four leglock. At the event, he was inducted into the WCW Hall of Fame as a member of the class of 1995.

== Personal life ==
During Poffo's time in college, he met another student at DePaul, Judith (Judy) nee Sverdlin from Naperville, Illinois; they wed on June 6, 1949. They were married for more than 60 years, and together they had two sons, Randy (1952–2011) and Lanny (1954–2023), both professional wrestlers. After retiring from professional wrestling, Poffo taught physical education in Illinois. His son Randy would support his parents, sending them on trips abroad until they were too old to travel. On Angelo's 70th birthday in 1995, Randy paid $50,000 (equivalent to $106,000 in 2025) to buy his father a yellow Cadillac automobile, the same car Poffo had purchased in 1959 and drove around the wrestling circuit for 200,000 miles. When Poffo was sick, Randy installed an invalid toilet and walk-in bathtub in his parents' home. He was also known for saving money to help provide his family.

On March 4, 2010, Poffo died in his sleep at age 84. His son Randy told the Tampa Bay Times, “I have always been proud to call Angelo Poffo my father, he is a great example of a self-sacrificing, hard-working man who always put his family first. He has always been my hero and my mentor, and the priceless gifts he gave I will have and cherish forever.”

Poffo is buried at Queen of Heaven Catholic Cemetery in Hillside, Illinois, near his hometown of Downers Grove.

== Championships and accomplishments ==
- All-South Wrestling Alliance
  - ASWA United States Tag Team Championship(1 time) - with Rock Hunter
- Atlantic Grand Prix Wrestling
  - AGPW North American Tag Team Championship (1 time) with Cuban Assassin
- Cauliflower Alley Club
  - Other honoree (1996)
- Fred Kohler Enterprises
  - NWA Midwest Heavyweight Championship (7 times)
  - NWA United States Heavyweight Championship (Chicago version) (1 time)
  - NWA Midwest Tag Team Championship (1 time) – with Bronco Lubich
- International Championship Wrestling
  - ICW Television Championship (1 time)
- NWA Detroit
  - NWA World Tag Team Championship (Detroit version) (1 time) – with Lanny Poffo
- Southwest Sports, Inc.
  - NWA Texas Tag Team Championship (1 time) – with Bronco Lubich
- World Championship Wrestling
  - WCW Hall of Fame (Class of 1995)
- World Wrestling Association
  - WWA World Tag Team Championship (3 times) – with Chris Markoff (2), Nicoli Volkoff (1)
