= List of professional wrestling managers and valets =

This is a list of professional wrestling managers and valets.

== List ==
=== Pioneer-era (1900s–1940s) ===
This section lists notable professional wrestling managers, especially those of the "Farmer" Burns-Frank Gotch and "Gold Dust Trio"-eras, active prior to the formation of the National Wrestling Alliance (NWA) in 1948.

Ring name (Real name)^{[a]}	Life	Years active^{[b]}	Promotion	Managed	Ref.
Billy Sandow (Wilhelm Baumann)	1884–1972	1900s- circa 1920s	National Wrestling Association	Ed "Strangler" Lewis, Billy Jenkins, Marin Plestina, Everett Marshall	
Frank Smith (Francis Marion Smith)	1878–1933	1925–1933	National Wrestling Association	Jim Browning	
Dimitrios Tofalos	1884-1966	circa 1910s-1930s	National Wrestling Association	Jim Londos	

=== Territory-era (1940s–1980s) ===
This section lists notable professional wrestling managers during the "Golden Age of Professional Wrestling" following the creation of the National Wrestling Alliance (NWA) in 1948.

Ring name (Real name)^{[a]}	Life	Years active^{[b]}	Promotion	Managed	Ref.
Abu Wizal (Milad Elzein)	1960–	1987–1989	Stampede Wrestling	18 wrestlers	
Adnan Al-Kaissie	1939–2023	1982–1994	American Wrestling Federation, Mid-South Wrestling, American Wrestling Association, World Wrestling Federation	Sgt. Slaughter, Col. Mustafa, Jerry Blackwell, Ken Patera The Rat Pack	
Al Costello (Giacomo Costa)	1919-2000	1993-1994	independent circuit, Border City Wrestling, Windy City Pro Wrestling	Al Snow, Denny Kass, Mickey Doyle	
Angelo Mosca	1937–2021	1984-1985	World Wrestling Federation	Angelo Mosca Jr.	
Armand Hussein (Mike Barber)	1934–2007	1981–1983	World Class Championship Wrestling	H & H Limited	
Arnold Skaaland	1925–2007	1968–1983	World Wide Wrestling Federation	Bob Backlund, Bruno Sammartino, Rick McGraw, Tony Parisi	
Baby Doll (Nickla Roberts)	1962–	1984–1992	Jim Crockett Promotions, Universal Wrestling Federation, World Class Championship Wrestling	17 wrestlers	
Baron von Raschke (James Raschke)	1940–	1988	World Wrestling Federation	Powers of Pain	
Bill Dundee (William Cruickshanks)	1943–	1986–1987, 1993–1994	Continental Wrestling Association, Jim Crockett Promotions, World Championship Wrestling	Masahiro Chono, Lord Steven Regal, Buddy Landell, The Barbarian, The MOD Squad	
Bobby Davis	1937-2021	1956–1969	World Wide Wrestling Federation	Buddy Rogers, Johnny Valentine, Johnny Barend, Magnificent Maurice, The Graham Brothers	
Bobby Heenan (Raymond Heenan)	1944–2017	1960–1993	American Wrestling Association, World Wrestling Federation, World Wrestling Association (Indianapolis)	The Heenan Family	
Boogaloo Brown		1980s-1990s	Ladies Professional Wrestling Association, American Wrestling Federation	Black Venus, Bad Girl, Texas Hangmen	
Boss Winders (Eddie Winders)		1986-1991	United States Wrestling Association	Don Bass, Soultaker, Rough & Ready, The Twilight Zone	
Brenda Britton (Brenda Joyce Sciarra)	1941–2007	1980–1987	Central States Wrestling, Continental Championship Wrestling, Georgia Championship Wrestling, International Championship Wrestling, National Wrestling Alliance	Rip Rogers	
Bruce Swayze	1940-	1972-1977	National Wrestling Alliance, Stampede Wrestling, National Wrestling Federation, Championship Wrestling From Florida, International Wrestling Association, Continental Wrestling Association	Abdullah the Butcher, Love Brothers, Crusher Verdu, Samoans	
Buck Robley (Phil Buckley)	1945–2013	1968–1985	Mid-South Wrestling, Central States Wrestling, Southwest Championship Wrestling, St. Louis Wrestling Club	Bob Sweetan, Lorenzo Parente, Bobby Hart	
Buddy Rogers (Herman Rohde)	1921–1992	1978–1983	Mid-Atlantic Championship Wrestling, World Wrestling Federation	Gene Anderson, Jimmy Snuka	
Bulldog Benson (Clifford Stafford)	1937–2005				
Bunny Love (Bunny Burmeister)	1960–	1979–1990	International Championship Wrestling, World Wrestling Association	Paul Christy	
Cherie Dupré (Cherie Ann Marie Duval)	1927–2000	1952–1962	National Wrestling Alliance	Gorgeous George	
Chicky Starr (Jose Laureano)	1958–	1986–	IWA Puerto Rico, World Wrestling Council	El Club Deportivo, Starr Corporation	
Charlie the Gent (Charles McGeen)	unknown (dead)	1981-1986	Joint Promotions	various opponents of Big Daddy	
Christopher Love (Bert Prentice)	1958-2021	1980s-1990s	Global Wrestling Federation, Ladies Professional Wrestling Association, Southwest Championship Wrestling, United States Wrestling Association	Mike Samples, Eric Fontaine, Randy Rhodes, Tully Blanchard, The Glamour Girls	
Count Grog (Greg Mosorjak)	1961–	1981–1984; 1993–2004; 2006–2011	Independent Professional Wrestling Alliance, OMEGA, Southern Championship Wrestling, Southern States Wrestling	41 wrestlers, 7 tag teams	
Dale Edwards (George Hill)	1948–2006		All Star Wrestling, International Championship Wrestling		
Dark Angel (Angel Gabriele)	1956–2016	1986–1991; 1998–2000	World Wrestling Association		
Dark Journey (Linda Newton)	1957–	1985–1987	Jim Crockett Promotions, Mid-South Wrestling, Universal Wrestling Federation	Dick Slater, Buzz Sawyer, The Missing Link, Iceman Parsons, Four Horsemen	
Deepak Singh (Deepak Massand)	1942-2021	1971-1987	Grand Prix Wrestling (Montreal), International Wrestling, Lutte International	Abdullah the Butcher, Great Antonio	
Dexter J. Holley (Dexter Jones Holley)	1973-	1988– Presently Semi Retired	NWA Mid Atlantic, ACPW, Heritage Pro Wrestling, Galaxy Championship Wrestling, Vanguard Championship Wrestling, Southern Championship Wrestling, Southern Pro Wrestling, Tod Gordon's Pro Wrestling Unplugged, and Various Southeastern-Midwestern-and Northeastern indies	(Holley was best known for managing his Fourth Alliance stable for the majority of his career. The stable consisted of various members over the years.), C. W. Anderson and Pat Anderson, Tully Blanchard, Ivan Koloff, Russian Assassins, Preston Quinn, Tracy Gilbert, KC McKnight, Rick Link, Stan Braddock, The Golden Eagle, and Dozens Of Others	
Dr. Mark Curtis (Brian Hildebrand)	1962–1999	1984–1990	World Wrestling Alliance	Cactus Jack, Preston Steele, Jesse Sellica, Chris Evans, The Moondogs	
Doctor Monika Kaiser (Monika Markwart)	unknown	1987-1990	Joint Promotions , All Star Wrestling	Drew McDonald	
Dutch Mantel (Wayne Keown)	1949–	1985–1989; 1995–1996; 2013–2016	Continental Wrestling Association, United States Wrestling Association, World Championship Wrestling, World Wrestling Federation / Entertainment	6 wrestlers, 2 tag teams	
Don Carson (Don Gatson)	1934–2013	1964–1984	Southwest Championship Wrestling	Jos LeDuc, The Mongolian Stomper, The Ninja, The Grapplers	
Don Duffy (Donald Quigley)	1933–2013	1962–1975			
Sir Dudley Clements (Steven Beresford)	1947–1976	1968–1976	National Wrestling Alliance, World Wrestling Association	The Brute, The Fabulous Kangaroos, The Heavenly Bodies	
Eddie Gilbert (Thomas Gilbert, Jr.)	1961–1995	1986–1993	Continental Wrestling Federation, Extreme Championship Wrestling, Universal Wrestling Federation	Hot Stuff International, Inc.	
Eddie Creatchman	1928–1994	1948–1985	International Wrestling, National Wrestling Alliance	Abdullah the Butcher, Don Leo Jonathan, George Cannon, Gilles Poisson, Tarzan Tyler, The Sheik, Sailor White	
The Fabulous Moolah	1923–2007	1949–2007	National Wrestling Alliance, World Wrestling Federation	Buddy Rogers, Elephant Boy, Mad Maxine, Leilani Kai, Mae Young, Harley Race, Terri Runnels	
Firmin	unknown	1960s	Fédération Française de Catch Professionnel	Robert Duranton	
Floyd Creatchman	1957–2003	1984–1987	International Wrestling, National Wrestling Alliance	Hercules Ayala, Sweet Daddy Siki, Pretty Boy Simms, The Great Samu, Richard Charland, Sheik Ali	
Freddie Blassie	1918–2003	1935–2003	World Wide Wrestling Federation / World Wrestling Federation	35 wrestlers	
Frenchy Martin (Jean Gagné)	1947–2016	1987–1989, 2000	Lutte Internationale 2000, World Wrestling Federation	Abdullah the Butcher, Dino Bravo, Jos Leduc	
Friday (Frank Dalton)	1941-1995	1982-1985	World Wrestling Federation, Mid-South Wrestling, World Class Championship Wrestling, American Wrestling Association	Handler for Kamala	
Gary Hart (Gary Williams)	1942–2008	1979–1999	Jim Crockett Promotions, World Class Championship Wrestling	numerous wrestlers	
The Genius (Lanny Poffo)	1954–2023	1989–1992	World Wrestling Federation	Mr. Perfect, Beverly Brothers	
George Cannon (George McCarther)	1932–1994	1970–1994	International Wrestling Association, National Wrestling Alliance	The Fabulous Kangaroos	
George Gillette	died 1989	1971-1988	Joint Promotions , Stampede Wrestling , All Star Wrestling	Kendo Nagasaki	
George "Two Ton" Harris	1927–2002	1966–1979	Jim Crockett Promotions	15 wrestlers	
Gerhart Kaiser (Greg Bullard)	unknown	1972–1980	Big Time Wrestling	Alexia Smirnoff, Bob Roop, The Von Brauners	
The Grand Wizard (Ernie Roth)	1926–1983	1965–1983	World Wide Wrestling Federation	Numerous wrestlers and tag teams	
Harvey Wippleman (Bruno Lauer)	1965–	1979–1995	World Wrestling Federation, Continental Championship Wrestling, United States Wrestling Association	65 wrestlers and tag teams	
Hillbilly Jim (James Morris)	1952–	1985–1986, 1995–1997	World Wrestling Federation	Uncle Elmer, Cousin Luke, Cousin Junior, The Godwinns	
Hiro Matsuda (Yasuhiro Kojima)	1937–1999	1989	World Championship Wrestling	Yamasaki Corporation	
Homer O'Dell	deceased	1966–1984	Georgia Championship Wrestling, Jim Crockett Promotions, Southeastern Championship Wrestling	Bronco Lubich, Aldo Bogni, Brute Bernard, Missouri Mauler, Hiro Matsuda, Rip Hawk, The Angel (Frank Morell), David and Jerry Novak	
Ivan Koloff (Oreal Perras)	1942–2017	1984–1986	Jim Crockett Promotions,	Nikita Koloff	
Izzy Slapawitz (Jeff Smith)	1948–2019	1978–1992	International Championship Wrestling	Slapowitz Syndicate, The Devil's Duo	
Jack Crawford	unknown		Georgia Championship Wrestling	El Mongol, Tarzan Tyler, The Samoans	
James Dudley	1910–2004	1950s-1960s	World Wide Wrestling Federation	Bobo Brazil, Sweet Daddy Siki, Sailor Art Thomas, Bearcat Wright	
J.C. Dykes (James Clayton Dykes)	1926–1993	1964–1976		The Champion, The Zodiac, The Infernos, The Mighty Yankees	
J. J. Dillon (James Morrison)	1942–	1985–1989	Jim Crockett Promotions, World Championship Wrestling	Four Horsemen	
J.R. Foley (James Foley)	d. 1988	1973–1986	Stampede Wrestling	Archie Gouldie, Bad News Allen, Duke Myers, The Dynamite Kid, Kerry Brown, Les Thornton, The Viet Cong Express	
Jim Cornette	1961–	1982–2012	National Wrestling Alliance, World Class Championship Wrestling, World Championship Wrestling, World Wrestling Federation	The Midnight Express, Heavenly Bodies, Camp Cornette, Jeff Jarrett, Mantaur, New Midnight Express, NWA Invasion	
Jimmy Hart	1944–	1981–2002; 2005, 2010	Continental Wrestling Association, Total Nonstop Action Wrestling, World Championship Wrestling, World Wrestling Federation	The First Family, Bret Hart, Jim Neidhart, Dino Bravo, Earthquake, The Mountie Nasty Boys, Hulk Hogan, Brutus Beefcake, Dungeon of Doom, Emory Hale	
John Heath	1923–2004	1970s	Championship Wrestling From Florida	Mike Graham, Dick Slater	
John Tolos	1930–2009	1990–1994	Universal Wrestling Federation, World Wrestling Federation	Bob Orton, Jr., Mr. Perfect, The Beverly Brothers	
Johnny Valiant (John L. Sullivan)	1946–2018	1985–1989	American Wrestling Association, World Wrestling Federation	Brutus Beefcake, Hulk Hogan, The Spoiler, Greg Valentine, Dino Bravo, Demolition, The Destruction Crew	
KeMonito	1967–	1988–	Consejo Mundial de Lucha Libre	Tinieblas	
Dr. Ken Ramey (John K. Ramey)	1930–2014	1968–1979	National Wrestling Alliance	Paul DeMarco, The Interns, Buddy Rose, Ed Wiskoski	
Kenny Bolin	1960–	1986–2012	Ohio Valley Wrestling	Bolin Services, Bolin Services 2.0	
Kevin Sullivan	1949–2024	1987–1991, 1995–1996	Jim Crockett Promotions, World Championship Wrestling	Cactus Jack, The Giant, Superstar Billy Graham, One Man Gang, Oz, Black Blood, The Varsity Club	
Kim Chee (Steve Lombardi)	1961–	1986–1987, 1992–1993, 2001	World Wrestling Federation	Kamala, Sika	
KY Wakamatsu (Ichimasa Wakamatsu)	1942–	1982-1984, 1989	Stampede Wrestling	Kerry Brown, Bad News Allen, Mike Shaw, Ron Starr, The Cobra, Mr. Pogo, Mr. Hito, Hiro Saito	
Leo Newman	1908–1992		National Wrestling Alliance, World Wrestling Association	Tony Borne	
The Lock (Winona Barkley)	1955–2020	1984–1986	Championship Wrestling from Florida	Army of Darkness	
Lou Albano	1933–2009	1969–1995	World Wrestling Federation	31 wrestlers, 14 tag teams	
Luna Vachon (Gertrude Vachon)	1962–2010	1985–2007	Extreme Championship Wrestling, World Wrestling Federation	Bam Bam Bigelow, Gangrel, Goldust, Tommy Dreamer, The Oddities	
Mad Maxine (Jeannine Mjoseth)	1959–	1985–1986	Continental Championship Wrestling, Universal Wrestling Federation	Norvell Austin, Jack Victory, Wahoo McDaniel	
Madusa Miceli (Debrah Miceli)	1964–	1986–1989; 1991–1992; 1999–2000	American Wrestling Association, World Championship Wrestling	Curt Hennig, Evan Karagias, Kevin Kelly, Rick Rude, Randy Savage, Greg Valentine, The Dangerous Alliance, The Perfect Tag Team	
Mae Young	1923–2014	1939–2013	National Wrestling Alliance, World Wrestling Federation	The Fabulous Moolah, Mark Henry	
Magnum T. A. (Terry Allen)	1959–	1987–1988	Jim Crockett Promotions	Dusty Rhodes, Nikita Koloff	
Man Hamilton (unknown)	unknown	1968-1969	Big Time Wrestling (Detroit)	Thunderbolt Patterson	
Mark Manson (Mark Kroll)	unknown		National Wrestling Alliance	The Graduates	
Maw Bass (Mae Weston)	1923-1999	1973-1974	National Wrestling Alliance	Bass Brothers	
Miss Elizabeth (Elizabeth Hulette)	1960–2003	1985–1989; 1990; 1991–1992, 1996–2000	World Championship Wrestling, World Wrestling Federation	Randy Savage, Mega Powers, Hulk Hogan, Brutus Beefcake, Dusty Rhodes, Sapphire, Ric Flair, The Four Horseman, New World Order, Lex Luger, Sting	
Miss Linda (Linda Barbara Street)	1945–	1980s	Mid-South Wrestling, Stampede Wrestling, National Wrestling Alliance	Adrian Street	
Miss Sylvia (Marilyn Harrington)		1988–1990	Continental Wrestling Federation, World Class Championship Wrestling	The Stud Stable	
Missy Hyatt (Melissa Hiatt)	1963–	1985–1996	Extreme Championship Wrestling, Universal Wrestling Federation, World Class Championship Wrestling, World Championship Wrestling	9 wrestlers, 2 tag teams	
Mr. Fuji (Harry Fujiwara)	1935–2016	1985–1996	World Wrestling Federation	12 wrestlers, 3 tag teams	
Nate the Rat (Nathaniel Whitlock)	1955–		Continental Wrestling Association, Memphis Wrestling	Lord Humongous, Reggie B. Fine	
Nikita Mulkovitch	unknown	1960s-1970s	National Wrestling Alliance, World Wide Wrestling Federation	Rugged Russians	
Ole Anderson (Alan Rogowski)	1942-2024	1989-1990	World Championship Wrestling	Arn Anderson, Ric Flair, Barry Windham, Sid Vicious	
Oliver Humperdink (John Sutton)	1949–2011	1973–1993, 1995	American Wrestling Federation, Florida Championship Wrestling, World Championship Wrestling, World Wrestling Federation	numerous wrestlers	
Paul Bearer (William Moody)	1954–2013	1979–1998; 1999–2000; 2004–2013	Championship Wrestling from Florida, Total Nonstop Action Wrestling, United States Wrestling Association, World Class Championship Wrestling, World Wrestling Federation	The Undertaker, Kane, Steve Austin, Mick Foley, Rick Rude, Big Show, Vader	
Paul E. Dangerously (Paul Heyman)	1965–	1987–1994; 2001–2003; 2006–2007; 2012–	Extreme Championship Wrestling, World Championship Wrestling, World Wrestling Entertainment	42 wrestlers, 10 teams	
Paul Ellering	1953–	1983–2002, 2016–2018	American Wrestling Association, National Wrestling Alliance, New Japan Pro-Wrestling, World Wrestling Federation, NXT (WWE brand)	The Road Warriors, The Disciples of Apocalypse, The Authors of Pain	
Paul Jones (Paul Frederick)	1942–2018	1982–1991	Jim Crockett Promotions	Paul Jones' Army	
Percival A. Friend (Albion Joseph Friend)	1945–	1963–1976	National Wrestling Alliance	Black Angus Campbell, Harley Race, Roger Kirby, Bobby Hart (The Patriot), Hank James, J.B. Psycho, Tank Patton, Great Togo and Tokyo Joe	
Precious (Patti Williams)	1955–	1983–1992	American Wrestling Association, Jim Crockett Promotions, World Championship Wrestling, World Class Championship Wrestling	Jimmy Garvin	
Princess Paula (Paula Valdez)	died 2013	1981–1992	Joint Promotions, CWA, All Star Wrestling	Fit Finlay	
Red Berry (Ralph Berry)	1906–1973	1958–1965	National Wrestling Alliance, World Wide Wrestling Federation	Gorilla Monsoon, Hans Mortier, Toru Tanaka, Apache Bull Ramos, Killer Kowalski, The Fabulous Kangaroos	
Rip Tyler	1940-1997	1970s	Gulf Coast Championship Wrestling		
Ron Wright	1938–2015	1954–1979	National Wrestling Alliance, Continental Championship Wrestling	Dirty White Boy, The Mongolian Stomper	
Ronnie P. Gossett	1944–2007	1958–2006	United States Wrestling Association	Jerry Lawler, Bob Orton, Jr., Jeff Jarrett, Master of Pain, Tony Anthony	
Sam Bass (Fred Bass)	1935–1976	1960–1976	Gulf Coast Championship Wrestling, NWA Mid-America	Jerry Lawler, Jim White, Wright Brothers	
Saul Weingeroff (Solomon Weingeroff)	1916–1988	1960–1978	National Wrestling Alliance	4 wrestlers, 7 tag teams	
Sapphire (Juanita Wright)	1934–1996	1989–1990	World Wrestling Federation	Dusty Rhodes	
Sherri Martel (Sherri Russell)	1958–2007	1984–1997; 1999–2000, 2005	Extreme Championship Wrestling, World Championship Wrestling, World Wrestling Federation	23 wrestlers, 5 teams	
Skandor Akbar (Jimmy Wehba)	1934–2010	1977–2009	Global Wrestling Federation, Universal Wrestling Federation, World Class Championship Wrestling	Devastation Inc.	
Slick (Ken Johnson)	1957–	1986–1993	Central States Wrestling, World Wrestling Federation	26 wrestlers	
Sonny King (Larry Johnson)	1945–	1968–1986	Southeastern Championship Wrestling	Arn Anderson, The Samoans	
Stan Kowalski (Bert Smith)	1926–2017	1950–1976	American Wrestling Association	Ivan Koloff, Strong Kobayashi	
Stately Wayne Manor (Ernie Santilli)		1980s-1990s		Eddie Gilbert, Kat Leroux	
Sunshine (Valerie French)	1962–	1983–1987	Universal Wrestling Federation, World Class Championship Wrestling	Jimmy Garvin, Billy Jack Haynes, The Great Kabuki, Hercules Hernandez, Chris Adams, Scott Casey, The Missing Link, Brian Adias, Jack Victory, John Tatum, The Fabulous Freebirds	
Superstar Billy Graham (Eldridge Coleman)	1943–2023	1987	World Wrestling Federation	Don Muraco	
Theodore Long	1947–	1989–1998, 2003–2004	Jim Crockett Promotions, World Championship Wrestling	19 wrestlers, 6 tag teams	
Tojo Yamamoto (Harold Watanabe)	1927–1992	1989–1991	World Class Championship Wrestling	Phil Hickerson, Dennis Knight	
Toni Adams	1964–2010	1985–1995	Global Wrestling Federation, United States Wrestling Association, Universal Wrestling Federation, World Class Championship Wrestling	Chris Adams, Brian Christopher, Scotty Flamingo, Koko B. Ware, Tony Falk, Rod Price, Iceman Parsons	
Tony Angelo (Henry Pardi)	deceased	1950–1973	National Wrestling Alliance, World Wide Wrestling Federation	Crusher Verdu, Ivan Koloff, Bepo and Geeto Mongol	
Tony Rumble (Anthony Magliaro)	1956–1999	1988–1999	Century Wrestling Alliance, International World Class Championship Wrestling	The Brotherhood	
Víctor Quiñones	1959–2006	1990–2006	IWA Puerto Rico, Frontier Martial-Arts Wrestling, IWA Japan	Mr. Pogo, The Headhunters	
Virgil (Mike Jones)	1951–2024	1987–1991; 1996–2000, 2010	World Championship Wrestling, World Wrestling Federation	Ted DiBiase, Andre the Giant, nWo, Ernest Miller, Ted DiBiase Jr.	
The Wizard (Curtis Iaukea)	1937–2010	1986–1987; 1995–1996	World Championship Wrestling, World Wrestling Federation	Kamala, Sika, Dungeon of Doom	
Woman (Nancy Benoit)	1964–2007	1984–1997	Extreme Championship Wrestling, National Wrestling Alliance, World Championship Wrestling	20 wrestlers	
Zeke Rivers		1981-1996	Central All-Star Wrestling, United States Wrestling Association	Brian Christopher, Cleo Reeves, Don Bass, Grim Reaper, Jeff Gaylord	

=== Modern-era (1990s-present) ===
This section lists notable professional wrestling managers from the collapse of the National Wrestling Alliance territory system in 1992 up to the 21st century.

Ring name (Real name)^{[a]}	Life	Years active^{[b]}	Promotion	Managed	Ref.
711 (Rob Feinstein)	1972–	1997	Extreme Championship Wrestling	Blue World Order	
911 (Alfred Poling)	1957–	1994-1996	Extreme Championship Wrestling	Paul Heyman, Sabu	
Abraham Washington (Brian Jossie)	1978–	2009-2012	Florida Championship Wrestling, WWE	Alex Riley, Corey Graves, Brad Maddox, Primo and Epico, Darren Young, Titus O'Neil	
Afa (Afa Anoa'i, Sr.)	1942–2024	1992–1995	World Wrestling Federation	The Headshrinkers	
Aksana (Živilė Raudonienė)	1981–	2009-2012	Florida Championship Wrestling, WWE	Goldust, Eli Cottonwood, Antonio Cesaro	
Alex Abrahantes	1977–	1996-	All Elite Wrestling	Pentagón Jr., Fenix, Pac	
Alexa Bliss	1991–	2013-	WWE NXT (WWE brand)	Blake and Murphy	
Alexis Laree (Mickie James)	1979–	1999–	KYDA Pro Wrestling	12 wrestlers	
Alexxis Nevaeh (Alisha Inacio)	1987–	2007–2009	Chaotic Wrestling	Danny E., Scotty Slade, The Blowout Boys	
Alicia Fox (Victoria Crawford)	1986–	2006–2019	Florida Championship Wrestling, Ohio Valley Wrestling, World Wrestling Entertainment	Elijah Burke, DJ Gabriel, Zack Ryder, JTG, Cedric Alexander, Noam Dar	
Allie (Laura Dennis)	1987–	2005-	Impact Wrestling, All Elite Wrestling, various Canadian promotions	Braxton Sutter, Jake O'Reilly, Maria Kanellis, Allysin Kay, Laurel Van Ness	
Allison Danger (Cathy Corino)	1977–	2000, 2007	Extreme Championship Wrestling, Ring of Honor	Christopher Daniels, Mike Kruel, Dan Maff, Donovan Morgan, The Sandman, B. J. Whitmer, Xavier, Lance Steel, Matt Sydal	
Amy Vitale	1977–	1995–	Future of Wrestling, Full Impact Pro, Florida Championship Wrestling, National Wrestling Alliance	Craig Classic, Jerry Lynn, Kahagas, New Jack, Alex Porteau	
Amy Weber	1970–	2004–2005	World Wrestling Entertainment	John "Bradshaw" Layfield	
Amy Zidian	1985–	2006	World Wrestling Entertainment	Jimmy Wang Yang	
Angela Fong	1985–	2008	Florida Championship Wrestling	The Puerto Rican Nightmares (Eric Pérez and Eddie Colón)	
Angelina Love (Lauren Ann Williams)	1981–	2005–2007	Ohio Valley Wrestling, Deep South Wrestling	14 wrestlers, 2 tag teams	
Annie Social	1982–	2009	Shimmer Women Athletes	Melanie Cruise, Wesna	
Anya (Anna Bogomazova)	1990–	2012–2013	World Wrestling Entertainment		
April Hunter	1976–	1999–2018	World Championship Wrestling		
April Pennington	1980–	2000–2006	Total Nonstop Action Wrestling	Brian Christopher	
Armando Estrada (Hazem Ali)	1978–	2006–2007, 2011, 2019	Ohio Valley Wrestling, World Wrestling Entertainment	Umaga, Tyson Kidd	
Arn Anderson (Martin Lunde)	1958–	1997-2001, 2019–present	World Championship Wrestling, All Elite Wrestling	Ric Flair, Cody Rhodes, Brock Anderson	
Ashley Massaro	1979-2019	2005-2007	World Wrestling Entertainment	Trish Stratus, Brian Kendrick, Paul London	
The Assassin (Jody Hamilton)	1938–2021	1993-1994	World Championship Wrestling	Paul Orndorff, Paul Roma, The Equalizer	
Asya (Christi Wolf)	1966–	1999–2000	World Championship Wrestling	David Flair, Ric Flair, Dean Malenko, Perry Saturn, Dale Torborg	
Austin Idol (Michael McCord)	1949–	2010s	National Wrestling Alliance	Nick Aldis	
Babu (Pablo Márquez)	1973–	1998-1999	World Wrestling Federation	Tiger Ali Singh	
Belladonna (Leah Biggerstaff)	1979–2019	2002-2003	Total Nonstop Action Wrestling	The Disciples of the New Church	
Bert Prentice	1958-2021	1991-1996	United States Wrestling Association	Tully Blanchard, Vampire Warrior	
Beth Phoenix (Elizabeth Kociański)	1980–	2004-2006, 2008-2009	Ohio Valley Wrestling, WWE	Aaron Stevens (wrestler), Chris Masters, Jacob Duncan, Brent Albright, Santino Marella	
Beulah McGillicutty (Trisa Hayes)	1969–	1995–1998	Extreme Championship Wrestling	Raven, Stevie Richards, Tommy Dreamer	
Bill Alfonso (William Sierra)	1957–	1996–	Extreme Championship Wrestling, Total Nonstop Action Wrestling, Women's Extreme Wrestling	Rob Van Dam, Sabu, Taz	
Bob Backlund	1949–	1996–1997; 2000, 2016–2017	World Wrestling Federation/ Entertainment	The Sultan, Kurt Angle, Darren Young	
Bobby Bass (Dennis Baldock)	1947-	2002	Real Action Wrestling	The Kardinal Sinners	
Brooke Tessmacher (Brooke Adams)	1984–	2006–2017	Total Nonstop Action Wrestling, World Wrestling Entertainment	Dan Rodimer, The Miz, Tara, Bully Ray	
Brother Love (Bruce Prichard)	1963–	1990–1993, 1997	Global Wrestling Federation, World Wrestling Federation	Barry Horowitz, The Dark Patriot, Scotty The Body, The Undertaker, The Flying Nuns	
Buggy Nova (Natalie Osman)	1989–	2010–2011	Alternative Wrestling Show	Extreme Loco, The Plague	
Byron Saxton (Bryan Kelly)	1981–	2008–2010	Florida Championship Wrestling	Wade Barrett, Michael Tarver, Naomi Knight, Cameron Lynn, Black Pain, Mason Ryan	
Camacho (Tevita Fifita)	1983–	2011-2013	World Wrestling Entertainment	Hunico	
Cameron (Ariane Nicole Andrew)	1987–	2011–2016	World Wrestling Entertainment	Brodus Clay, Tensai, Natalya, R-Truth, Xavier Woods	
Candice Michelle	1978–	2004–2006	World Wrestling Entertainment	Torrie Wilson, Victoria, Maria Kanellis	
Caylee Turner (Christina Crawford)	1988–	2010–2012	World Wrestling Entertainment, Florida Championship Wrestling		
Chastity (Denise Riffle)	1971–	1996–2000	Extreme Championship Wrestling, World Championship Wrestling, Xtreme Pro Wrestling	Raven's Nest, The Sandman	
Cheerleader Melissa (Melissa Anderson)	1982–	1999–2013	Total Nonstop Action Wrestling	Awesome Kong, The Sheiks	
Cherry (Kara Drew)	1975–	1999–2008	Ohio Valley Wrestling, World Wrestling Entertainment	Deuce 'n Domino	
Chief Jay Strongbow (Joe Scarpa)	1928–2012	1994-1995	World Wrestling Federation	Tatanka, Lex Luger	
Christy Hemme	1980–	2005	WWE	Legion Of Doom	
Chyna (Joan Laurer)	1970–2016	1997–2001	World Wrestling Federation	D-Generation X, Triple H, Chris Jericho, Eddie Guerrero	
Clarence Mason (Herman Stevens, Jr.)	1965–	1995–1997, 2000	World Championship Wrestling, World Wrestling Federation	Chris Kanyon, Camp Cornette, Harlem Heat 2000, Crush, The Nation of Domination	
Coach Buzz Stern (Raymond Lloyd)	1964–	1999	World Championship Wrestling	Luther Biggs	
Colonel Red/Mr. Red (Marty Yesberg)		1991–1992	Universal Wrestling Federation	Jimmy Valiant	
Colonel Robert Parker (Robert Welch)	1949–	1993–1998	World Championship Wrestling, World Wrestling Federation	The Stud Stable, Jeff Jarrett, Mongolian Mauler	
The Commandant (Robin B. Smith)	1955–	1997	World Wrestling Federation, United States Wrestling Association	The Truth Commission	
Cookie	1982-	2010-2011	Total Nonstop Action Wrestling	Robbie E	
Curtis Hughes	1964–	1997, 1999	World Wrestling Federation	Triple H, Chris Jericho	
Cynthia Lynch	1971–	1996–1999; 2002	Total Nonstop Action Wrestling, World Wrestling Federation	The Godfather, Simon Diamond, Steve Corino, Al Snow, David Young	
Daffney (Shannon Spruill)	1975–2021	1999–2003; 2007–2010; 2013–2021	Ohio Valley Wrestling, Ring of Honor, Shimmer Women Athletes, Total Nonstop Action Wrestling, World Championship Wrestling, Xtreme Pro Wrestling	36 wrestlers, 3 teams	
Daizee Haze	1983–	2002-2011	Ring of Honor, Chikara, IWA Mid-South, Shimmer Women Athletes		
Damien Kane	1960–	1995–1996	Extreme Championship Wrestling	D. C. Drake, The Executioners, The Headhunters	
Dave Prazak		1996–2002	Full Impact Pro, IWA Mid-South	27 wrestlers	
Dawn Marie (Dawn Marie Psaltis)	1970–	1995–2005	Extreme Championship Wrestling, Maryland Championship Wrestling, Mid-Eastern Wrestling Federation, X Wrestling Federation	Tony Atlas, Simon Diamond, Swinger, Lance Storm, Devon Storm, Buddy Landell, Steve Corino, Johnny Candido, The Impact Players	
Debra Marshall	1960–	1995–2002	World Championship Wrestling, World Wrestling Federation	13 wrestlers	
Desire (Kim Nielsen)	1973–	2001–2004	Total Nonstop Action Wrestling	Sonny Siaki, Ekmo	
Diamond Dallas Page (Page Falkinburg)	1956–	1988, 1991–1992	American Wrestling Association, World Championship Wrestling	10 wrestlers, 2 teams	
Diana Hart	1963–	1992, 1994–1997	World Wrestling Federation	Davey Boy Smith, The Hart Foundation	
Dirty White Girl (Kim Anthony)	1968–	1989–1994	United States Wrestling Association, Smoky Mountain Wrestling	Len Denton, Tony Anthony	
Disco Inferno (Glenn Gilbertti)	1968–	1999–2000; 2003–2004	Total Nonstop Action Wrestling, World Championship Wrestling	Beryln, The Mamalukes, Simon Diamond and Johnny Swinger, The New York Connection	
Don West	1963–2022	2002–2012	Total Nonstop Action Wrestling	Amazing Red	
Elektra (Donna Adamo)	1970–	1999–2001	Extreme Championship Wrestling	Danny Doring and Roadkill, Dangerous Alliance, Hot Commodity	
Emma (Tenille Averil Dashwood)	1989–	2005, 2008–2009, 2014–2017, 2022–2023	Elite Canadian Championship Wrestling, Prairie Wrestling Alliance, PWA Australia, World Wrestling Entertainment	Carlo Cannon, Dylan Knight, Dan Myers, Scotty Mac, Santino Marella, Madcap Moss	
Eric Bischoff	1955–	1996–2000; 2006–2007, 2012–2014	Total Nonstop Action Wrestling, World Championship Wrestling, World Wrestling Entertainment	Hulk Hogan, The New Blood, nWo, 3-Minute Warning, Chris Jericho, Kurt Angle, Rated-RKO, Immortal	
Eva Marie (Natalie Marie Coyle)	1984–	2013–2017; 2021	World Wrestling Entertainment	Natalya, The Bella Twins	
Ezekiel Jackson (Rycklon Stephens)	1978–	2008-2009	World Wrestling Entertainment	Brian Kendrick	
Francine (Francine Fournier)	1972–	1995–2001; 2003–2006	Extreme Championship Wrestling, ECW (WWE), Major League Wrestling	10 wrestlers, 2 teams	
Gail Kim	1977–	2005–2007	Total Nonstop Action Wrestling	America's Most Wanted	
Goldust's Bodyguard (Mike Halac)	1968–2023	1996	World Wrestling Federation	Goldust	
Goldy Locks (Moon Shadow)	1979–	2002–2004	Total Nonstop Action Wrestling	Erik Watts, Abyss, Alex Shelley	
Gorgeous George (Stephanie Bellars)	1976–	1999–2004; 2008–2014	Extreme Championship Wrestling, Women Superstars Uncensored, World Championship Wrestling	Randy Savage	
Greg Lambert	1972–	2003–2006; 2010–2012	Frontier Wrestling Alliance, XWA	Iceman, The UK Pitbulls	
Harley Race	1943–2019	1991–1995	World Championship Wrestling	Yoshi Kwan, Lex Luger, Tyler Mane, Big Van Vader	
Heath Slater (Heath Miller III)	1983–	2007	Florida Championship Wrestling	Shawn Osborne	
Hiroko (Hiroko Suzuki)	1974–	2004–2006	HUSTLE, World Wrestling Entertainment	Kenzo Suzuki, René Duprée	
The Honky Tonk Man (Roy Farris)	1953–	1997	World Wrestling Federation	Rockabilly	
Hornswoggle (Dylan Postl)	1986–	2006–2016	World Wrestling Entertainment	Fit Finlay, D-Generation X, various tag teams	
Hugo Savinovich	1959–	1980s-1990s	World Wrestling Council	25 wrestlers	
Hunter Q. Robbins III (Robin Hunt)	1967-2025	1990s	Extreme Championship Wrestling, Mid-Eastern Wrestling Federation, independent circuit	Johnny Hotbody, Chris Candido, AJ Petrucci, Doug Stahl, Rick Michaels, Scotty Summers	
The Iron Sheik (Hossein Vaziri)	1942–2023	1996–1998	World Wrestling Federation	The Sultan	
Ivory (Lisa Moretti)	1961–	1999–2005	World Wrestling Federation / Entertainment	Mark Henry, D'Lo Brown, The Hurricane, Lance Storm, Jackie Gayda, Right to Censor	
Jackie Gayda	1981–	2003–2006	Ohio Valley Wrestling, Total Nonstop Action Wrestling, World Wrestling Entertainment	Planet Jarrett, The Revolution, Chris Kanyon, Basham Brothers, Rico Constantino, Charlie Haas	
Jacqueline Moore	1964–	1991–1999; 2008–2009	United States Wrestling Association, World Championship Wrestling, World Wrestling Federation	Marc Mero, Shawn Stasiak, Acolytes Protection Agency, Beer Money, Inc.	
Jack Victory (Ken Rinehurst)	1965–	1998–2001	Extreme Championship Wrestling	Steve Corino, The Network	
The Jackyl (Don Callis)	1963–	1989–2004, 2020–	Extreme Championship Wrestling (as Cyrus the Virus), World Wrestling Federation (as The Jackyl); Impact Wrestling, All Elite Wrestling (as Don Callis)	The Truth Commission, The Oddities, Kurrgan, Edge, Acolytes Protection Agency, The Network, Kenny Omega, Don Callis Family	
Jade Chung	1984–	2003–	Border City Wrestling, IWA Mid-South, Pro Wrestling Guerrilla, Ring of Honor	Frankie Kazarian, Jimmy Rave, Conrad Kennedy III, A-1, Scorpio Sky, Mr. Hughes, Shane Douglas	
JADEN	1977–	1999–	Force One Pro Wrestling, NWA New Jersey	36 wrestlers, 1 tag team	
Jake Roberts (Aurelian Smith Jr.)	1955–	2020–2021	All Elite Wrestling	Lance Archer	
James Mitchell	1965–	1993–1994, 1997–2008, 2013	Extreme Championship Wrestling, Smoky Mountain Wrestling, Total Nonstop Action Wrestling, World Championship Wrestling	24 wrestlers, 4 tag teams	
Jamison (John DiGiacomo)		1991-1992	World Wrestling Federation	The Bushwhackers	
Jasmin St. Claire (Rhea Alexandra DeVlugt)	1972–	1999–2007	Extreme Championship Wrestling, Pro-Pain Pro Wrestling	The Blue Meanie, Damien Steele, The Public Enemy	
Jason Knight (Ronald Knight)	1963–	1995, 1997–2000	Extreme Championship Wrestling	Chad Austin, Mr. Hughes, The Pitbulls, The Eliminators, The Impact Players	
Jason Saint	1985–	2013–	IWA Mid-South, Strong Style Wrestling, Glory Pro Wrestling, Ohio Valley Wrestling, Global Force Wrestling, Infinity Pro Wrestling	Michael Elgin, The Faces of Fear, Kongo Kong, Gangrel, Kevin Thorn, Shane Mercer, Curt Stallion, Tripp Cassidy, The Carnies, Michael Hayes, Adam Bueller, Amazing Maria, Chase Matthews	
Jeeves (Gary Hedrick)		1995-1997	World Championship Wrestling	The Blue Bloods; Lord Steven Regal, David Taylor, Earl Robert Eaton	
Jesse Ventura (James George Janos)	1951–	2001	WWF	Minnesota Strechting Crew (Brock Lesnar and Shelton Benjamin)	
Jessie Belle Smothers (Jessie Belle McCoy)	1985–	2011	Ohio Valley Wrestling	Izza Belle Smothers, Tracy Smothers	
Jillian Hall	1980–	2004–2013	Ohio Valley Wrestling, World Wrestling Entertainment	John Bradshaw Layfield, MNM	
Jim Ross	1952–	1996, 1999	World Wrestling Federation	Diesel II, Razor Ramon II, Dr. Death Steve Williams	
Jimmy Del Ray (David Ferrier)	1962–2014	2001	NWA Wildside	The New Heavenly Bodies	
Joel Gertner	1975–	1997–	Extreme Championship Wrestling, Total Nonstop Action Wrestling	The Bad Street Boys, The Dudley Boyz, The Rainbow Express	
John Laurinaitis	1962–	2011–2012	World Wrestling Entertainment	Big Show, David Otunga, Team Johnny	
Johnny Polo (Scott Levy)	1964–	1993–1994	World Wrestling Federation	Adam Bomb, The Quebecers	
JoJo (Joseann Offerman)	1994–	2013	World Wrestling Entertainment	Total Divas	
Jonathan Coachman	1972–	1999–2008	World Wrestling Entertainment	Garrison Cade, Al Snow	
Jonny Ferrari	1987–	2013–	OMEGA Championship Wrestling, House of Glory, House of Hardcore, RONIN, Five Borough Wrestling, Future Stars of Wrestling	Ethan Carter III, AJ Styles, P. J. Black, Brian Cage, Robbie E, James Storm, Jessie Godderz, Kenny King, Mr. 450	
José Lothario (Guadalupe Robledo)	1934–2018	1996–1997	World Wrestling Federation	Shawn Michaels	
Joy Giovanni	1978–	2004–2005	World Wrestling Entertainment	Big Show	
Judge Jeff Jones	1975-	1999-2000	Extreme Championship Wrestling	Mike Awesome	
Julius Smokes		2003–2007	Ring of Honor	The Rottweilers, The Vulture Squad	
Kantaro Hoshino	1943–2010	2002–2004	New Japan Pro-Wrestling	Makai Club	
Karen Jarrett	1972–	2007–2008; 2011	Total Nonstop Action Wrestling	Kurt Angle, A.J. Styles, Jeff Jarrett, Madison Rayne, Gail Kim	
The Kat (Stacy Carter)	1970–	1999–2001	World Wrestling Federation	Jeff Jarrett, Debra, Al Snow, Chyna	
Kelly Kelly (Barbie Blank)	1987–	2006–2012	ECW (WWE)	Mike Knox, The Miz	
Kenny Bolin	1960–	1997–	Ohio Valley Wrestling	John Cena, Mark Henry, Bobby Lashley, Lance Cade, Rene Dupree, Ken Doane and Mike Mondo	
Kenny Casanova	1971–	1995–	independent circuit	Sweet Pete Waters, Chris Maxon (Papa Chill), The Milwaukee Mauler, H. C. Loc, King Kaluha and Salvatore Sincere	
Kevin Kelly (Kevin Foote)	1967–	1999–2001	East Coast Wrestling Association	Alliance of Defiance, Connecticut Connection	
Kevin Nash	1959-	1993-1994	World Wrestling Federation (as Diesel)	Shawn Michaels	
Khosrow Daivari (Shawn Daivari)	1984–	2005–2007	World Wrestling Entertainment	Muhammad Hassan, Kurt Angle, Mark Henry, The Great Khali, Raisha Saeed	
Kimberly Page (Kimberly Bacon)	1970–	1994–2000	World Championship Wrestling	Diamond Dallas Page, Johnny B. Badd, The Booty Man, Mike Awesome	
Kloudy (James Haney)	1962–	1996	World Wrestling Federation	Bodydonnas	
Kimona Wanaleya (Kristina Laum)	1976–	1996–2002	Extreme Championship Wrestling, World Championship Wrestling	Raven, The Jung Dragons, The Varsity Club	
Kristal Marshall	1983–	2006–2007; 2009–2010	Total Nonstop Action Wrestling, World Wrestling Entertainment	The Miz, Bobby Lashley	
Krissy Vaine (Kristin Eubanks)	1981–	2000–2003, 2006, 2009	Deep South Wrestling, NWA Charlotte	Kevin Matthews, Amber O'Neal	
Lacey	1983–	2005–2008	Full Impact Pro, Ring of Honor	12 wrestlers, 1 tag team	
Lady Blossom (Jeannie Clark)	1959–	1990–1991	World Class Championship Wrestling, World Championship Wrestling	Steve Austin	
Lady Victoria (Victoria Moreno)	1972–	1991–2002	AAA, Consejo Mundial de Lucha Libre	Máscara Sagrada, El Pantera, Halloween, Damián 666, Rey Misterio, Sr.	
Lamont/Mo Green (Demond Thompson)	1975–	2004-2005	World Wrestling Entertainment, Ohio Valley Wrestling	Ernest Miller, Chris Silvio	
Lana (Catherine Joy Perry)	1985–	2013–	World Wrestling Entertainment, All Elite Wrestling	Rusev, Dolph Ziggler, Aiden English, Bobby Lashley, Tamina, Natalya, Naomi, Andrade El Idolo	
Lance Wright		1997-1998	Extreme Championship Wrestling	Droz, Brakkus	
Larry Sweeney (Alexander K. Whybrow)	1981–2011	2004–2011	CHIKARA, Ring of Honor	Sweet 'n' Sour International	
Larry Zbyszko (Lawrence Whistler)	1951–	2003	Total Nonstop Action Wrestling	A.J. Styles	
Layla El	1977–	2006–2015	World Wrestling Entertainment	The Miz, William Regal, Dolph Ziggler, Michelle McCool, Victoria, Fandango	
Lena Yada	1978–	2008–2009	World Wrestling Entertainment	Layla, Victoria	
Lita (Amy Dumas)	1975–	1999–2006	Extreme Championship Wrestling, Maryland Championship Wrestling, World Wrestling Entertainment	10 wrestlers, 3 tag teams	
Little Richard Marley (William Boulware, Jr.)	1958–2022	1990	World Championship Wrestling	Fabulous Freebirds	
Lizzy Borden (Janet Romano-Zicari)	1977–	1999–2003	Xtreme Pro Wrestling	Shane Douglas, Rob Black, The Messiah	
Lloyd Ryan	unknown	1989–2007	All Star Wrestling, Rumble Wrestling, LDN Wrestling	Kendo Nagasaki and others	
Lollipop (Jaime Lynne)	1979–	2002–	IWA Mid-South, Memphis Wrestling, NWA Main Event	Ron Harris, Nate Webb, The Naturals	
Lord Littlebrook (Eric Tovey)	1929–2016	1990-1991	World Championship Wrestling	Jack Victory, Rip Morgan	
Lord Zoltan (Ken Jugan)	1957–	2007–2008	International Wrestling Cartel	Abdullah the Butcher, Larry Zbyszko, T. Rantula	
Lori Fullington	1967–	1989–1994; 1996–1997, 2000	Extreme Championship Wrestling	Tommy Cairo, Raven, The Sandman	
Major Gunns (Tylene Buck)	1972–	1999–2003	World Championship Wrestling, Xtreme Pro Wrestling	nWo 2000, Misfits In Action, Team Canada, The Sandman	
Makoto-hime (Makoto)	1989–	2011	Union Pro Wrestling	Cao Zhang, Choun Shiryu, Mio Shirai	
Mandy (Frostee Moore)	1971–	2000	World Wrestling Federation	Godfather, Rikishi, Too Cool, Eddie Guerrero	
Maria Kanellis	1982–	2004–	CHIKARA, Ring of Honor, World Wrestling Entertainment, Total Nonstop Action Wrestling	Santino Marella, Dolph Ziggler, Mike Bennett, Matt Taven, Adam Cole, Matt Hardy, The Young Bucks	
Marianna (Marianna Komlos)	1969–2004	1999	World Wrestling Federation	Chaz	
Marie (Dina DeStefano)	1963-	2000-2001	World Championship Wrestling	Big Vito	
Maryse (Maryse Ouellet)	1983–	2006–2006; 2010–2011; 2016–	Florida Championship Wrestling, Ohio Valley Wrestling, World Wrestling Entertainment	Ryan O'Reilly, Ted DiBiase, Jr., Deuce 'n Domino, The Miz	
Matt Hardy	1974–	2020–	All Elite Wrestling	Private Party	
Matt Striker (Matthew Kaye)	1974–	2007-2008, 2011	ECW, NXT	Big Daddy V, Mark Henry, Tyson Kidd	
Max Muscle (John Czawlytko)	1963–2019	1992–2003	World Championship Wrestling	Diamond Dallas Page	
Maxine (Karlee Perez)	1986–	2009–	Florida Championship Wrestling, Lucha Underground, NXT	Abraham Washington, Aksana, Alicia Fox, Damien Sandow, Derrick Bateman, Lucky Cannon, Mil Muertes, Sweet Papi Sanchez, Fénix, The Disciples of Death	
Maxxine Dupri	1997–	2022–	World Wrestling Entertainment	Von Wagner, Mace, Mansoor, LA Knight, Alpha Academy	
Melina (Melina Perez)	1979–	2004–2022	Family Wrestling Entertainment, Ohio Valley Wrestling, World Wrestling Entertainment	Johnny Nitro, Joey Mercury, Mark Henry, Mick Foley, Victoria, Eric Young	
Melody Medeiros	1983–	2006–2009	Ohio Valley Wrestling	Johnny Punch, Pat Buck, Adam Revolver, Dewey, Ted McNaler, Tommy McNaler, Kid Kash	
Mia Yim (Stephanie Bell)	1989–	2009–	Combat Zone Wrestling, Full Impact Pro, Ring of Honor	Adam Cole, Dos Ben Dejos, The Embassy, Taryn Terrell, The O.C	
Michael Hayes (Michael Seitz)	1959–	1999, 2011	World Wrestling Federation / Entertainment	Tyson Kidd; The Hardy Boyz	
Michelle McCool	1980–	2004–2011	World Wrestling Entertainment	Amish Roadkill, Jon Heidenreich, K.C. James, Idol Stevens, Tommy Dreamer, Chuck Palumbo, Jamie Noble, Kaval, Dolph Ziggler, Layla El	
Midajah (Melinda McCullum)	1970–	1999–2001	World Championship Wrestling	Perry Saturn, Scott Steiner	
Midnight (Ann-Marie Crooks)	1965–	1999–2000	World Championship Wrestling	Harlem Heat	
Mini Máximo	1989–	2007–	Consejo Mundial de Lucha Libre	La Peste Negra	
Molly Holly (Nora Greenwald)	1977–	1999–2005	Memphis Championship Wrestling, World Championship Wrestling, World Wrestling Federation / Entertainment	Spike Dudley, Crash Holly, Hardcore Holly, The Hurricane, Lance Storm, Gail Kim, William Regal, Randy Savage, Great Muta	
Momma Benjamin (Thea Vidale)	1956–	2005-2006	World Wrestling Entertainment	Shelton Benjamin	
Monique Dupree	1974-	2013-	House of Hardcore, Impact Wrestling	Moose, Vic Dalishus, EC3, Clayton Gaines, Crimson, Kevin Thorn	
Mortimer Plumtree (David Webber)	1969–	1994–2005	American Wrestling Federation, Total Nonstop Action Wrestling	12 wrestlers, 1 tag team	
Mr. Vander Pyle (Marty Lurie)	1972–	2003–	NWA Pro, Pro Wrestling Guerrilla	25 wrestlers, 1 tag team	
Mrs. Yamaguchi-San (Shian-Li Tsang)	1975–	1998	World Wrestling Federation	Kaientai	
Muffy (Caryn Lynn Mower)	1965–	2000	World Wrestling Federation	Stephanie McMahon	
Nagisa Nozaki	1990–	2012–2013	Wrestling New Classic	Hajime Ohara	
Natalya	1982–	2000–	World Wrestling Entertainment	The Hart Dynasty, Beth Phoenix, Victoria, Tyson Kidd, Cesaro, Mae Young, Lana, Tamina Snuka, Ronda Rousey, Shayna Baszler, The Great Khali	
Nick Mondo	1980–	2019-2020	All Elite Wrestling	Jon Moxley	
Nicole Bass	1964–2017	1998–1999	Extreme Championship Wrestling, World Wrestling Federation	Raven's Nest, Val Venis	
Nidia (Nidia Guenard)	1979–	2002–2004	World Wrestling Entertainment	Jamie Noble, Maven, Dawn Marie	
Nitro Girl Chameleon (Carmel Macklin)	1975–	2000	World Championship Wrestling	Ernest Miller	
Nitro Girl Spice (Melissa Anne Grill)	1973–	1997–2000	World Championship Wrestling	Evan Karagias, Madusa	
Nitro Girl Tygress (Vanessa Sanchez)	1971–	2000–2001	World Championship Wrestling	The Filthy Animals	
The Original Sheik (Ed Farhat)	1924–2003	1990-1995	Frontier Martial-Arts Wrestling, World Championship Wrestling	Sabu	
Oscar	1970–	1993–1995	World Wrestling Federation	Men on a Mission	
Ox Baker (Douglas Baker)	1934–2014	1988-1990	American Wrestling Association	Russian Brute, Nightstalker	
Papaya (Cathy Dingman)	1970–	1999, 2000, 2002	World Championship Wrestling, World Wrestling Federation, Total Nonstop Action Wrestling	Kwee Wee, Tennessee Mountain Boys, Hillybilly Cuzin Ray	
Payton Banks (Bonnie Maxon)	1981–	2007–2008	Total Nonstop Action Wrestling	Robert Roode, Kenny King, Jason Blade, Chasyn Rance, Sal Rinauro, Jimmy Jacobs, Tyler Black	
Prince Nana	1977–	2002–2006; 2008–2011; 2014–	Ring of Honor	The Embassy	
The Prodigette	1969–	2000–2001	Extreme Championship Wrestling	The Sideshow Freaks	
Puck Dupp (Marty Garner)	1968–	1999-2000	Extreme Championship Wrestling, World Wrestling Federation	The Dupps	
Queen Sharmell (Sharmell Sullivan-Huffman)	1970–	1998–2001, 2005–2009	Ohio Valley Wrestling, Total Nonstop Action Wrestling, World Championship Wrestling, World Wrestling Entertainment	Booker T, Kwee Wee, The Artist, Meng	
Ralphus (John Riker)	d. 2019	1998-2000	World Championship Wrestling	Chris Jericho, Norman Smiley	
Ranjin Singh (Dave Kapoor)	1975–	2007–2011	World Wrestling Entertainment	The Great Khali	
Raquel Diaz (Shaul Marie Guerrero)	1990–	2010–2011	Florida Championship Wrestling, World Wrestling Entertainment	Conor O'Brian, Kenneth Cameron, Tito Colon	
R. D. Reynolds (Randy Baer)	1969–	1994–2001	NWA Indianapolis, Ohio Valley Wrestling	Mad Man Pondo, Mark Henry	
Reby Sky (Rebecca Reyes)	1986–	2015-2018	Total Non-Stop Action, World Wrestling Entertainment	Matt Hardy	
Reggie B. Fine (Reginald Walker)	1962-	1989-2005	United States Wrestling Association	11 wrestlers	
Rhea Ripley (Demi Bennett)	1996-	2013-	World Wrestling Entertainment	The Judgment Day	
Ric Flair (Richard Fliehr)	1949–	2002–2005, 2009–2012, 2016	Total Nonstop Action Wrestling, World Wrestling Entertainment	Roddy Piper, Jimmy Snuka, Ricky Steamboat, Desmond Wolfe, Beer Money, Inc., Evolution, Fortune, Charlotte Flair	
Rick Rude (Rick Rood)	1958–1999	1997–1999	Extreme Championship Wrestling, World Championship Wrestling, World Wrestling Federation	Shane Douglas, D-Generation X, nWo	
Rico (Rico Constantino)	1961–	1998–2005	World Wrestling Entertainment	Billy and Chuck, 3-Minute Warning	
Rico Suave (Julio Caceres)	1970–	1992–	World Wrestling Council	El Poder Supremo	
The Roadie (Brian James)	1969–	1994–1995	World Wrestling Federation	Jeff Jarrett	
Rosa Mendes (Milena Leticia Roucka)	1979–	2007-2015	WWE, Ohio Valley Wrestling	11 wrestlers	
Roxxi Laveaux (Nicole Raczynski)	1979–	2007–2009	Total Nonstop Action Wrestling	Kid Kash, Lexxus, Taylor Wilde, Voodoo Kin Mafia	
Ryan Shamrock (Alicia Webb)	1979–	1999–2013	AAA, World Championship Wrestling, World Wrestling Federation	Ken Shamrock, Val Venis, Meat, Goldust, The Maestro, X-Pac	
Sable (Rena Greek)	1967–	1996–1999; 2003–2004	World Wrestling Federation / Entertainment	A-Train, Hunter Hearst Helmsley, Marc Mero, Mr. McMahon, The Oddities	
Sakamoto (Kazma Sakamoto)	1982–	2012-2013	World Wrestling Entertainment	Lord Tensai	
Santana Garrett	1988–	2010	Total Nonstop Action Wrestling	Orlando Jordan	
Sara (Sara Calaway-Frank)	1977–	2001-2002	World Wrestling Federation/Entertainment	The Undertaker, Kane	
Sayuri Kokushō	1966–	2008–	Oz Academy	Ozaki-gun	
Scarlett Bordeaux (Elizabeth Chihaia)	1991–	2011–	Ring of Honor, Total Nonstop Action Wrestling, World Wrestling Entertainment	Matt Taven, Karrion Kross, Authors of Pain	
Scott D'Amore	1974–	2003–2010	Total Nonstop Action Wrestling	Team Canada	
Scott Hall	1958–2022	2010-2011	Indepednet circuit	Ricky Ortiz	
Shane McMahon	1970–	1998–2002; 2006–2008	World Wrestling Federation / Entertainment	The Rock, Big Show, Chris Benoit, Kurt Angle, Booker T, Umaga, Edge and Christian, Mean Street Posse	
Shaniqua (Linda Miles)	1978–	2002–2004	World Wrestling Entertainment	Shelton Benjamin, The Basham Brothers	
Shelly Martinez	1980–	2005–2008	ECW (WWE), Ohio Valley Wrestling, Total Nonstop Action Wrestling	Aaron Stevens, Paul Burchill, Seth Skyfire, Kevin Thorn, Elijah Burke, Marcus Cor Von, Matt Striker, Homicide, Hernandez	
Shinja (Akio Sato)	1953–	1994–1995	World Wrestling Federation	Hakushi	
Sign Guy Dudley (Lou D'Angeli)	1972–	1995–2003	Extreme Championship Wrestling	The Dudley Brothers, The Dangerous Alliance	
SoCal Val (Paige Mayo)	1986–	2002–	Shine Wrestling, Total Nonstop Action Wrestling, Women's Extreme Wrestling	21 wrestlers, 1 tag team	
Sonny Onoo (Kazuo Onoo)	1962–	1995–1999	World Championship Wrestling	12 wrestlers, 2 tag teams	
Sosay (Jennifer Kaiser)	1980–	2003–2007	Ohio Valley Wrestling	Ken Doane, Osama Rodriguez Alejandro, Robbie Dawber, Jack Bull	
Spyder (Arthuro Flores)		1998-1999	World Championship Wrestling	Latino World Order	
Stacy Keibler	1979–	2000–2006	World Championship Wrestling, World Wrestling Entertainment	6 wrestlers, 4 tag teams	
Stephanie McMahon	1976–	1999–2002; 2013–	World Wrestling Federation / Entertainment	Triple H, Kurt Angle, Chris Jericho, Hulk Hogan, Zach Gowen, Ric Flair, Edge and Christian	
Steve Corino	1973–	1994–	Extreme Championship Wrestling, Ring of Honor	Kevin Steen, Rhino, Yoshihiro Tajiri	
Steve Rizzono (Steve Coombs)	1970–	2004	All Pro Wrestling	The Rizzono Mafia	
Stevie Richards (Michael Manna)	1971–	1995, 2001, 2002-2003, 2009	World Wrestling Federation/Entertainment, Extreme Championship Wrestling, Total Nonstop Action Wrestling	KroniK (Brian Adams and Bryan Clark), Victoria, Francine, Daffney	
Summer Rae (Danielle Moinet)	1983–	2013–2017	World Wrestling Entertainment	Fandango, Layla, Dolph Ziggler, Rusev, Tyler Breeze	
Sunny (Tamara Sytch)	1972–	1993–2018	Extreme Championship Wrestling, Smoky Mountain Wrestling, World Wrestling Federation, World Championship Wrestling, Ring of Honor	Chris Candido, Brian Lee, LOD 2000, The Smoking Gunns, The Godwinns, Savio Vega, Farooq, Shane Douglas, Bam Bam Bigelow, Taka Michinoku	
Sweet Saraya (Saraya Jade Bevis)	1971–	1992–present	All Star Wrestling, British Wrestling Federation , World Association of Wrestling	The Superflies (Ricky Knight & Jimmy Ocean)	
Synn (Stacey Goff Cornette)	1977–	1998-2004	Ohio Valley Wrestling	The Discipels of Synn: Damein, Payne, Leviathan, Bane, Connie Swail, Seven, Slash	
Tamina Snuka (Sarona Reiher)	1978–	2009–2023	Florida Championship Wrestling, World Wrestling Entertainment	Santino Marella, Vladimir Kozlov, JTG, AJ Lee, Naomi, The Usos	
Taryn Terrell	1985–	2007–2011	Florida Championship Wrestling, World Wrestling Entertainment	Brad Allen, Nic Nemeth, Kelly Kelly	
Ted DiBiase	1954–	1994–1999	World Championship Wrestling, World Wrestling Federation	Million Dollar Corporation, Irwin R. Schyster, Steve Austin, nWo	
Terri Runnels	1966–	1990–2004	World Championship Wrestling, World Wrestling Federation / Entertainment	9 wrestlers, 5 teams	
Tiger Ali Singh (Gurjit Singh Hans)	1973–	2000–2001	World Wrestling Federation	Lo Down (D'Lo Brown) and (Chaz)	
Tiger Jeet Singh (Jagjeet Singh Hans)	1944–	1997	World Wrestling Federation	Tiger Ali Singh	
Tod Gordon	1955–	2002–2004	Pro-Pain Pro Wrestling	Xtreme Fight Club	
Tommy Rich (Thomas Richardson)	1956–	1997–1999	Extreme Championship Wrestling	The Full Blooded Italians	
Tony Atlas (Anthony White)	1954–	2008-2009	World Wrestling Entertainment	Mark Henry	
Tony Mamaluke (Charles Spencer)	1977–	1999–2000	World Championship Wrestling	The Mamalukes	
Tori (Terri Poch)	1964–	1999–2001	World Wrestling Federation	Kane, Road Dogg, Sable, X-Pac, Stephanie McMahon, Raven	
Traci Brooks (Tracy Brookshaw)	1975–	2001–2012	Total Nonstop Action Wrestling	16 wrestlers, 1 tag team	
Trinity (Stephanie Finochio)	1971–	2002–2007	Total Nonstop Action Wrestling, World Wrestling Entertainment	The Full Blooded Italians, Phi Delta Slam	
Triple H (Paul Levesque)	1969–	1992–2022	World Wrestling Entertainment	Seth Rollins, The Authority	
Trish Stratus (Patricia Stratigeas)	1975–	2000–2006	World Wrestling Federation / Entertainment	10 wrestlers, 1 team	
Truth Martini (Martin Krcaj)	1975–	2009–	Ring of Honor	The House of Truth	
Tully Blanchard	1954–	2019–	All Elite Wrestling	Shawn Spears, FTR, The Pinnacle	
Velvet Sky (Jamie Szantyr)	1981–	2003–2016	Total Nonstop Action Wrestling	10 wrestlers, 1 team	
Torrie Wilson	1975–	1999–2008	World Championship Wrestling, World Wrestling Entertainment	Filthy Animals, Yoshihiro Tajiri, Billy Gunn	
Vickie Guerrero	1968–	2005–2014, 2020–	World Wrestling Entertainment, All Elite Wrestling	La Familia, Chavo Guerrero Jr., Edge, Jack Swagger, Alosia, Kaitlyn, Nyla Rose	
Victoria (Lisa Marie Varon)	1971–	2000–2023	Memphis Championship Wrestling, Ohio Valley Wrestling, World Wrestling Entertainment	14 wrestlers	
Vince Russo	1961–	2000–2003	World Championship Wrestling, Total Nonstop Action Wrestling	David Flair, Sports Entertainment Xtreme	
William Regal	1981–	2004-2005, 2022	World Wrestling Entertainment, All Elite Wrestling	Eugene, Tajiri, Brayn Danielson, Claudio Castagnoli, Jon Moxley, Wheeler Yuta	
Winter (Katarina Waters)	1980–	2000–	Frontier Wrestling Alliance, Total Nonstop Action Wrestling, World Wrestling Entertainment	Hade Vansen, Paul Burchill, Angelina Love	
Yamaguchi-San (Yususke Yamaguchi)	1958–2019	1998	World Wrestling Federation	Kaientai	
Zelina Vega (Thea Trinidad)	1990–	2010–	Total Nonstop Action Wrestling, NXT, World Wrestling Entertainment	Mexican America, Andrade Cien Almas, Angel Garza, Legado Del Fantasma, Latino World Order, Rey Mysterio	

== See also ==
- List of professional wrestling promoters
- List of professional wrestling rosters

== Footnotes ==
- ^{a} – Entries without a birth name indicates that the individual did not perform under a ring name.
- ^{b} – This includes only the individual's time as a manager as opposed to other activities in the wrestling industry.
