= George Harris (wrestler) =

American professional wrestler and manager (1927–2002)

Personal information
- Born: June 12, 1927 Dyersburg, Tennessee, U.S.
- Died: November 29, 2002 (aged 75) Charlottesville, Virginia, U.S.

Professional wrestling career
- Ring name(s): George Harris III; Baby Blimp; Nature Boy Harris; El Gordo; Two Ton Harris
- Billed weight: 350 lb (159 kg)
- Debut: 1948
- Retired: 1979

George L. Harris (June 12, 1927 – November 29, 2002) was an American professional wrestler and manager for the National Wrestling Alliance (NWA). He spent the majority of his career working for Jim Crockett Promotions.

== Career ==
Harris first got involved in professional wrestling as a referee. Four years later, he began competing and touring as a wrestler. Weighing over 300 pounds, Harris wrestled as a heel (villain). Wrestling in the Eastern United States, Harris competed in several matches for the NWA World Heavyweight Championship against Pat O'Connor in 1961 but was unable to win the title belt.

Harris had several tag team partners, including George "Crybaby" Cannon, who also weighed over 300 pounds. He also teamed with Sputnik Monroe, with whom he won the NWA Western States Tag Team Championship while competing for NWA Western States Sports in 1962. For much of his career, Harris wrestled on the undercard at events.

In addition to competing in the ring, Harris also worked as a manager in several wrestling territories. He managed a masked team known as the Red Demons during their feud with George Becker and Johnny Weaver. The Demons were unmasked during a match and revealed to be Billy and Jimmy Hines. Harris also managed Bronko Lubich and Aldo Bogni in a feud against Becker and Weaver. On several occasions, Harris joined Lubich and Bogni in the ring to wrestle in six-man matches. Using the name George Harris III, he managed Pat Patterson against Ray Stevens, Patterson's former partner.

Harris, who was also a heel as a manager, angered crowds with his arrogance. He strutted to the ring and smiled arrogantly at the audience while he stroked his hair. His actions provoked violent reactions from the crowd on several occasions. He was stabbed on multiple occasions and suffered several injuries from soda bottles thrown from the audience. He was also hit with fire extinguishers on occasion, including one instance in Orlando, Florida that necessitated 26 stitches.

=== Jim Crockett Promotions ===
Harris began competing for Jim Crockett Productions in 1959. He stayed with the promotion under three different owners and continued to work for the company after retiring as a wrestler. Jim Crockett, Sr., the original owner, was a good friend of Harris. He promised Harris that he would be guaranteed employment with the company if Harris learned to read and write. Harris studied under a tutor and later continued to work for the company after Crockett died, as John Ringley and Jim Crockett, Jr. both upheld Crockett, Sr.'s promise. After Harris retired as both a manager and wrestler in 1979, he continued to work an office job for the company. He also served as groundskeeper at Jim Crockett, Sr. Memorial Park and worked at the Crockett family's convenience store. In 1988, Crockett, Jr. sold his wrestling organization to Ted Turner, who renamed it World Championship Wrestling. Harris continued to work for the company until he retired in 1990.

== Personal life ==
George Harris was born in Dyersburg, Tennessee, a town on the Mississippi River. During his career, Harris was an alcoholic; he attended Alcoholics Anonymous meetings and quit drinking. After retiring from wrestling, he lived with his wife Edna in Stuarts Draft, Virginia. In 2002, he suffered a heart attack and died on November 29.

== Championships and accomplishments ==
- NWA Western States Sports
  - NWA Western States Tag Team Championship (1 time) - with Sputnik Monroe
