= Bronko Lubich =

Hungarian-born Serbian Canadian professional wrestler (1925–2007)

Personal information
- Born: Bronko Sandor Lupsity; December 25, 1925 Batonja, Hungary
- Died: August 11, 2007 (aged 81) Plano, Texas, U.S.

Professional wrestling career
- Ring name(s): Bronko Lubich; Bronco Lubich
- Billed height: 6 ft 0 in (1.83 m)
- Billed weight: 175 lb (79 kg)
- Billed from: Belgrade, Yugoslavia
- Trained by: Mike DiMitre
- Debut: 1948
- Retired: 1973 (as wrestler); 1993 (as referee)

Bronko Sandor Lupsity (December 25, 1925 – August 11, 2007) was a Hungarian-born Serbian Canadian professional wrestler, manager, referee and promoter. Known by his ring names Bronco or Bronko Lubich, he and Aldo Bogni were veteran "heels" under manager "Colonel" Homer O'Dell competing in regional territories for the National Wrestling Alliance in Canada, the Pacific Northwest, Midwest and Southeastern United States throughout the 1960s. He and Bogni were particularly active in the Charlotte-area where they feuded with "The Flying Scotts" (George and Sandy Scott). They also had memorable feuds with George Becker and Johnny Weaver, Rip Hawk and Swede Hanson, Lars and Ole Anderson and Mr. Wrestling and Sam Steamboat.

Lubich also appeared as both a wrestler and manager in Texas during the early 1960s, most notably as the manager and cornerman of then NWA United States Heavyweight Champion Angelo Poffo from 1961 to 1964, and was often known to use his cane as a foreign object to help his men score victories. It was in this role that he became a well-known booker and promoter in the Dallas-Fort Worth area. He spent his last year as an active wrestler in Texas teaming with Chris Markoff where the two feuded with Mr. Wrestling and George Scott, and Johnny Valentine and Wahoo McDaniel.

After his retirement, he joined Fritz von Erich's World Class Championship Wrestling as head referee and part of the booking team for the promotion until its close in 1990. He is remembered by modern wrestling fans as one of its most visible referees, especially after WCCW began airing on televised events, and was involved in several major angles and storylines in the promotion. He was the official for many high-profile matches including the long-running feud between The Freebirds vs. the Von Erich family. He was also recognizable by his distinctive "slow counts" when a wrestler attempted a pinfall.

He was considered a highly respected official by wrestlers in the territory, according to interviews with former WCCW mainstays Scott Casey and Bill Mercer, and advised fellow wrestlers on both their professional careers and financial matters. Lubich, with Skandor Akbar, also had a small part in influencing the careers of several younger up-and-coming wrestlers including Mick Foley, "Stone Cold" Steve Austin, and manager Percy Pringle.

== Career ==
Lubich was born Branko Sandor Lupsity (Lupšić in Serbian) in Battonya, Hungary on December 25, 1925. His father (Mihailo) moved to Canada in 1926 and was eventually able to save enough money to bring his family over by boat to Montreal where they settled in December 1937. During his teenage years, he began working out with his friends at the local YMCA and took up amateur wrestling. He excelled in the sport and was selected to represent Canada in the 1948 Olympic Games, but he did not compete, having broken his arm while in another competition prior to the Olympics.

Although choosing to continue his amateur career, he also started work at an aircraft factory shortly after to support his family. It was while working out at the Montreal YMCA that he met local wrestlers Harry Madison and Mike DiMitre who suggested a career in professional wrestling. He was initially trained by DiMitre and made his professional debut in 1948. At 6-foot, 175 pounds, he spent his early career as a lightweight wrestler under the name Bronko Lubich and began teaming with Angelo Poffo by the late 1950s. In 1959, during a match between Poffo and Wilbur Snyder in Detroit, the referee was knocked unconscious. When Snyder attempted a pinfall, Lubich entered the ring and knocked out Snyder with his cane and revived the referee in time for Poffo to score a pinfall instead. This was the first time a manager had directly interfered in a wrestling match and, at the time, was one of the biggest televised angles. A rematch between Poffo and Snyder at the Olympia Stadium was attended by 16,226 people.

In 1961, Lubich made his debut in the Dallas area as the manager of Angelo Poffo. For three years, the pair would become one of the most hated "heels" in the territory. On a number of occasions, his interference saved Poffo from losing the NWA United States Heavyweight Championship. He and Poffo also held the WCWA Texas Tag Team Championship defeating Pepper Gomez and Dory Dixon in Houston, Texas on May 12, 1961. They held the titles for a month before losing them back to Gomez and Dixon on June 1. He and Poffo left the territory undefeated in 1964, Lubich moved on to Mid-Atlantic territory where he would remain for the majority of his career.

It was during this time that he was teamed with Aldo Bogni, in part due to the advice of promoter Jim Crockett, Sr., with their in-ring personas portraying hostile foreign wrestlers. They were joined by manager "Colonel" Homer O'Dell, and later George "Two Ton" Harris, who quickly became one of the top "heel" tag teams in the territory. O'Dell reportedly carried a revolver and sometimes fired it behind the arena to scare off fans who sometimes waited for them outside after the event. He and Bogni were later "sold" to Harris who participated in 6-man tag team matches with them.

Lubich would continue teaming with Bogni in the Carolinas, Florida and Stampede Wrestling up until the early 1970s. They faced many of the top stars of the era including the Flying Scotts, George Becker and Johnny Weaver, Rip Hawk and Swede Hanson, Lars and Ole Anderson and Mr. Wrestling and Sam Steamboat. He would also win the NWA Southern Tag Team Championship with Bogni defeating Eddie Graham and Lester Welch for the belts in West Palm Beach, Florida on March 11, 1968, before losing the titles to Jose Lothario and Joe Scarpa the next month.

During the last two years of his wrestling career, he formed a tag team with Chris Markoff with whom he later won the NWA Florida Tag Team Championship from Ciclon Negro and Sam Steamboat in Tampa on October 25, 1969. They lost the titles to the Missouri Mauler and Dale Lewis on March 14, 1970, after a four-and-a-half month reign.

In January 1971, he returned to the Dallas-Fort Worth area in what would be his last year as a wrestler. Joined by manager George "The Blimp" Harris III, he and Markoff feuded with longtime rivals Mr. Wrestling and George Scott as well as Johnny Valentine and Wahoo McDaniel, the latter team being considered one of the great "dream teams" of the era. He and Markoff were later approached by photographer Geoff Winningham to participate in a photoshoot for Life during a wrestling event in Houston. He was later quoted in the book Friday Night in the Coliseum describing life as a professional wrestler:

People are right when they say this is a violent sport. You must have violence in you to do it. No matter how much you want the money. People say I am a gentle person when they meet me. Naturally I do not stand around and growl at people on the streets. But I am basically very easily aroused. You just learn to control it. You have to live with people, and you can't go through life pushing them around. I concentrate on being a gentleman. But when I am in the ring it is a different story. I am out there to beat my opponent. And he is trying to beat me. Then it comes down to dollars and cents.

Lubich and Markoff won the NWA Big Time Wrestling Tag Team Championship twice before his retirement in 1972 to become a full-time manager. He managed many of the top "heels" in the area including Bobby Duncum, Sr., The Spoiler and Boris Malenko with his men frequently battling "Playboy" Gary Hart and his stable throughout the rest of the decade.

When Fritz Von Erich began promoting Southwest Sports, Jim Crockett, Sr. recommended Lubich to help go into business with von Erich. He also began refereeing for the promotion and, in 1973, refereed the NWA World Heavyweight Championship match between Jack Brisco and Harley Race in Houston. He would go on to referee matches in The Sportatorium, the North Side and Will Rogers Coliseum in Fort Worth as well as weekly appearances at venues in San Antonio, Corpus Christi and Houston. Both he and Poffo had been involved in investing stocks and bonds with Merrill Lynch early in their careers and Lubich later advised other wrestlers on investing in the stock market and other financial concerns.

After Kevin Von Erich decided to close WCCW in late 1990, Lubich retired from full-time professional wrestling, he refereed occasionally for Global Wrestling Federation. Although he and his wife had planned to travel following his retirement, both he and his wife, Radmila "Ella" (née Popov) Lupsity, suffered from poor health. She was diagnosed with cancer in 1997 and died in 2004. Lubich as well had prostate cancer and suffered several strokes resulting in difficulty speaking. He died at his home on August 11, 2007 and buried at Restland Memorial Park. He is survived by his three daughters, Kathy, Maria and Melonie.

== Championships and accomplishments ==
- Championship Wrestling from Florida
  - NWA Florida Tag Team Championship (1 time) – with Chris Markoff
  - NWA Southern Tag Team Championship (Florida version) (1 time) – with Aldo Bogni
- Mid-Atlantic Championship Wrestling
  - NWA Southern Tag Team Championship (Mid-Atlantic version) (1 time) - with Aldo Bogni
- NWA Big Time Wrestling
  - NWA American Tag Team Championship (2 times) – with Chris Markoff
  - NWA Texas Tag Team Championship (1 time) – with Angelo Poffo
