= Chris Markoff =

Yugoslavian-American professional wrestler (1938–2024)

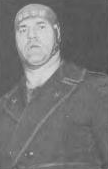

Personal information
- Born: Risto Zelevarov; March 1, 1938 Yugoslavia
- Died: February 10, 2024 (aged 85) U.S.

Professional wrestling career
- Ring name(s): Chris Jelevarov; Chris Jelevorou; Chris Markoff; Chris Markov; Chris Zeleurov; Harry Madison
- Billed height: 6 ft 0 in (1.83 m)
- Billed weight: 275 lb (125 kg; 19.6 st)
- Billed from: Macedonia; Serbia; Russia
- Debut: 1963
- Retired: 1993

Risto Zelevarov (March 1, 1938 – February 10, 2024), known professionally as Chris Markoff, was a Yugoslav-American professional wrestler. He was best known for his appearances with professional wrestling promotions in the Midwestern United States in the 1960s.

== Early life ==
Markoff was born in Yugoslavia and raised in Minneapolis, Minnesota, United States.

== Professional wrestling career ==
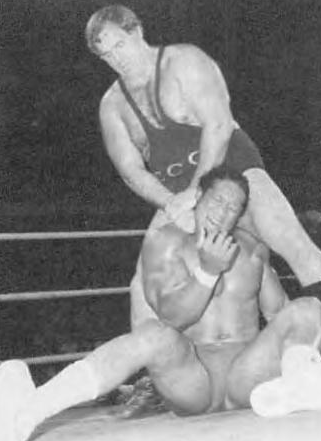
Markoff (top) applies a shoulder claw on Tony Atlas, c. 1984

Markoff began his career in the Minneapolis-based American Wrestling Association in the mid-1960s. Managed by Professor Steve Druk, he feuded with The Crusher. He became AWA World Tag Team Champion with Harley Race in January 1967 after Race's original partner, Larry Hennig, sustained a broken leg. Their reign ended in November 1967 when they were defeated by Pat O'Connor and Wilbur Snyder.

In the mid-1960s, Markoff began wrestling for the Indianapolis, Indiana–based World Wrestling Association, where he formed a tag team with Angelo Poffo called "The Devil's Duo". Markoff and Poffo won the WWA World Tag Team Championship in 1966 and again in 1967.

In the late 1960s, Markoff began competing for Championship Wrestling from Florida. He won the NWA Florida Tag Team Championship in 1969 and again in 1972.

In 1969, Markoff wrestled for the Los Angeles, California–based promotion NWA Hollywood Wrestling. Over the course of the year, he won the NWA Americas Tag Team Championship with Bronko Lubich, the NWA "Beat the Champ" Television Championship, and the NWA Pacific Coast Heavyweight Championship (Los Angeles version) three times.

In 1972, Markoff toured Japan with the Japan Wrestling Association, wrestling a series of matches against Apache Bull Ramos. Antagonism between Markoff and Ramos resulted in a legitimate brawl in a restaurant during which Ramos bit off part of Markoff's ear and Markoff bit off the tip of Ramos' finger.

In 1978, Markoff wrestled in New Zealand for All Star Pro Wrestling, briefly holding the NWA British Empire/Commonwealth Championship. In the same year, he wrestled in Hawaii for 50th State Big Time Wrestling, holding the NWA Hawaii Tag Team Championship with Steve Strong.

In 1981, Markoff joined the Charlotte, North Carolina–based Jim Crockett Promotions, where he formed a tag team with Nikolai Volkoff called "The Imperial Russians". Managed by Lord Alfred Hayes, the duo won the NWA Mid-Atlantic Tag Team Championship later that year.

By 1985 Markoff was back in the AWA as the manager and occasional tag team partner of Boris Zhukov.

== Death ==
Markoff died on February 10, 2024, at the age of 85, after suffering a stroke in January.

== Championships and accomplishments ==
- 50th State Big Time Wrestling
  - NWA Hawaii Tag Team Championship (1 time) – with Steve Strong
- American Wrestling Association
  - AWA World Tag Team Championship (1 time) – with Harley Race
- Championship Wrestling from Florida
  - NWA Florida Tag Team Championship (2 times) – with Bronko Lubich (1 time) and Bobby Shane (1 time)
- Jim Crockett Promotions
  - NWA Mid-Atlantic Tag Team Championship (1 time) – with Nikolai Volkoff
- NWA Big Time Wrestling
  - NWA American Tag Team Championship (1 time) – with Bronko Lubich
  - NWA Brass Knuckles Championship (1 time)
- NWA Detroit
  - NWA World Tag Team Championship (Detroit version) (1 time) – with Dominic DeNucci
- NWA Hollywood Wrestling
  - NWA Americas Tag Team Championship (1 time) – with Bronko Lubich
  - NWA "Beat the Champ" Television Championship (1 time)
  - NWA Pacific Coast Heavyweight Championship (Los Angeles version) (3 times)
- NWA New Zealand
  - NWA British Empire/Commonwealth Championship (New Zealand version) (1 time)
- World Wrestling Association
  - WWA World Tag Team Championship (2 times) – with Angelo Poffo
