= Manager (professional wrestling) =

Supporting character in professional wrestling

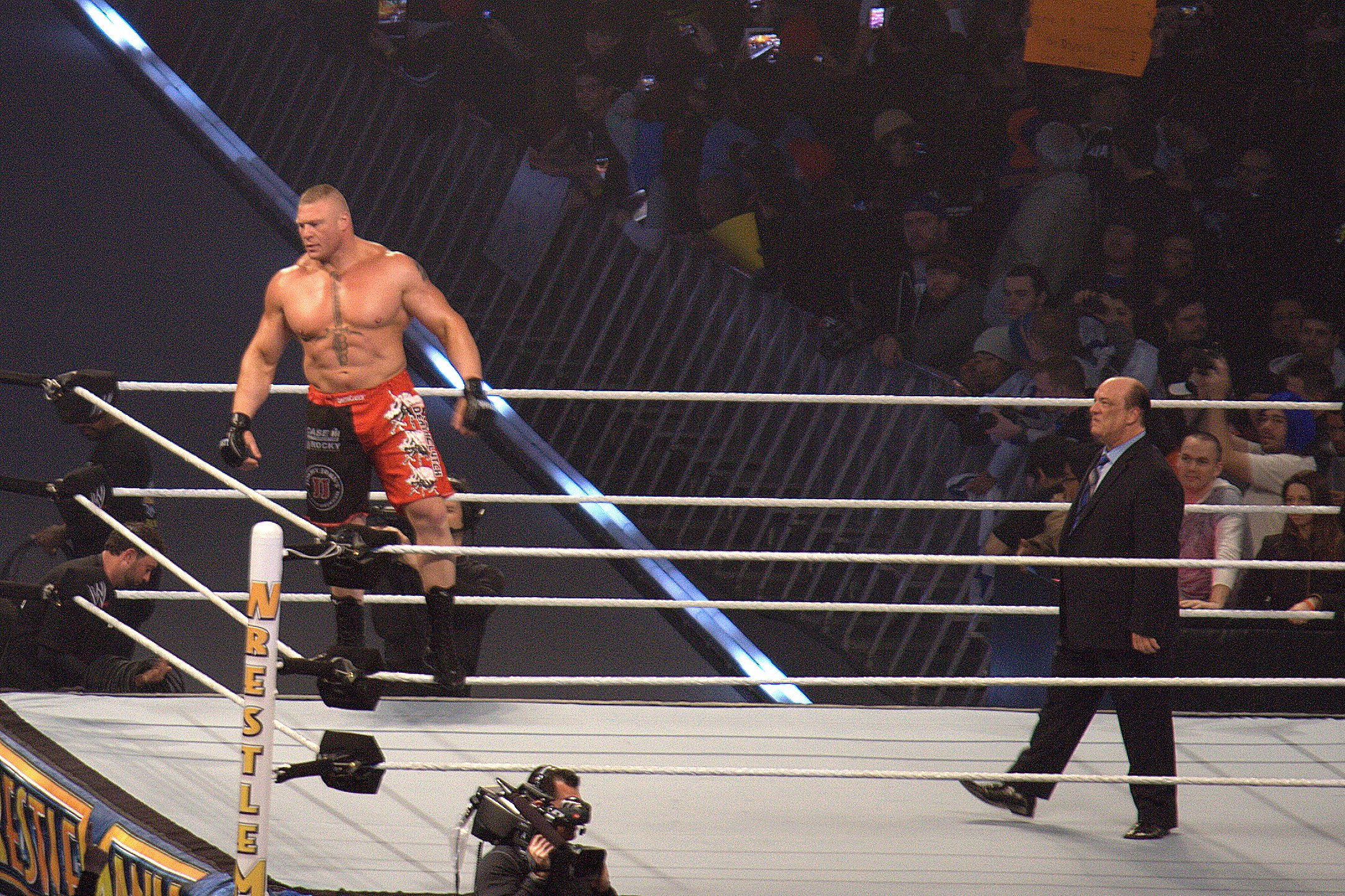
Brock Lesnar being accompanied by his "Advocate", Paul Heyman

In professional wrestling, a manager is a supporting character paired with a wrestler (or wrestlers) for a variety of reasons. A woman accompanying, or "seconding", a male wrestler to a match is sometimes referred to as a valet.

Performers who assume this role may be non-wrestlers, occasional wrestlers, older wrestlers who have retired or are nearing retirement, the tag team partner of the wrestler they are managing, or new wrestlers who are breaking into the business (or a specific company) and need experience in front of the crowds. The wrestler who is paired with a manager may be referred to as their charge, client, or ward. A professional wrestling manager's portrayal as a wrestler's decision-maker is usually fictional and has nothing to do with a wrestler or promotion's real-world counterpart or road agent.

== Role ==
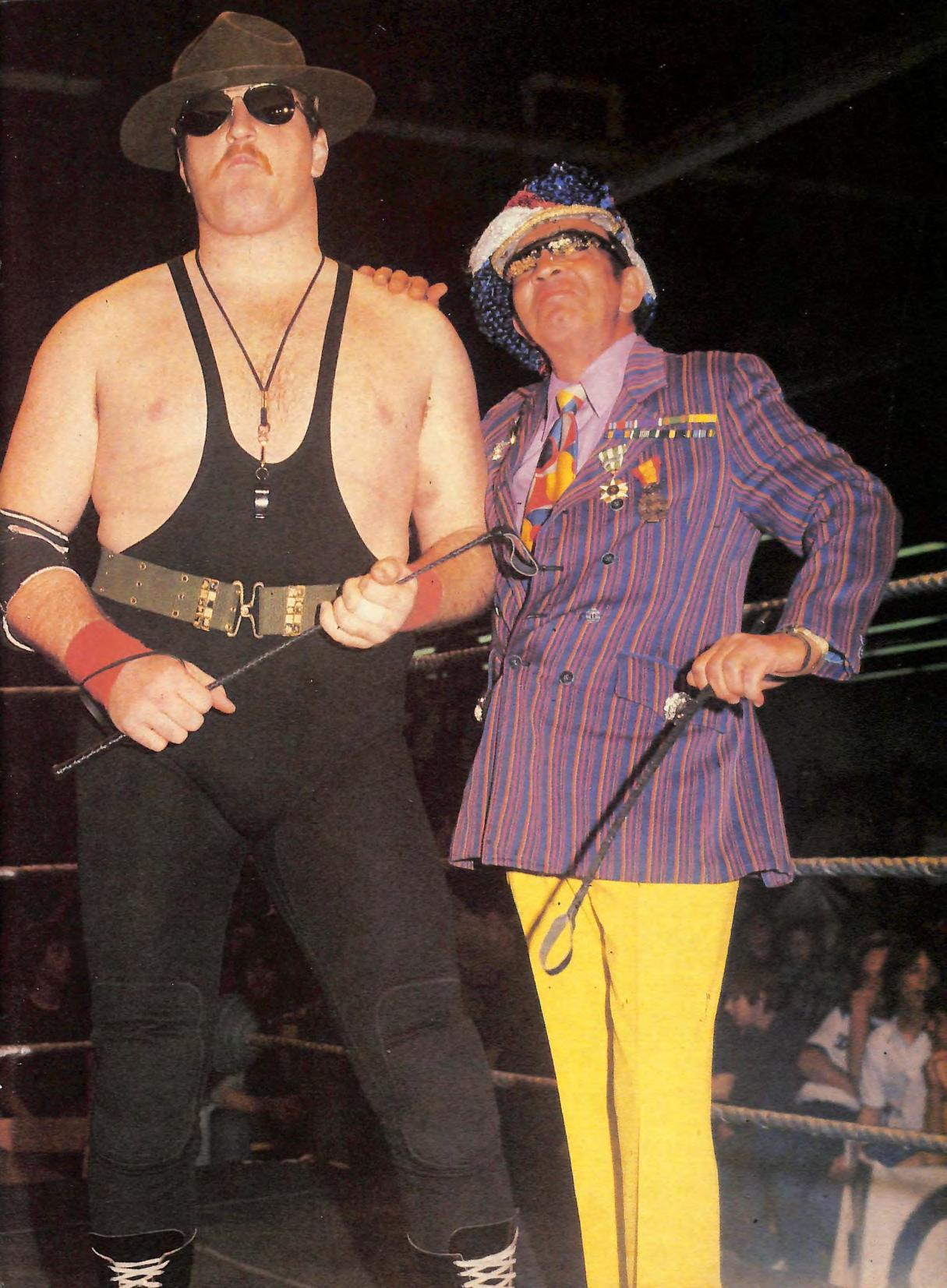
Sgt. Slaughter with manager The Grand Wizard

Managers are akin to storyline agents for an actor or an athlete; they help their client to book matches and appearances, and otherwise work to further and guide their career. Within the context of storylines, the manager positions their client for title opportunities, generally acts as a mouthpiece on their behalf, decides whom to trust as an ally, or serves as an exposed Achilles' heel to be exploited by their client's opponents. Managers could be utilized by a promotion's booker to instigate and strengthen storylines; their involvement could form the center of a controversy, for instance if they double-cross their clients or inadvertently cause the loss or forfeiture of their clients' championship titles.

Outside of storylines, a manager's job is to help the wrestler they are paired with get over. The manager would cut promos on behalf of clients who may not be as charismatic (or had gimmicks depicting them as silent, or with limited ability to speak English). As such, successful managers almost invariably had the "gift of the gab", though it was not unheard of to see managers paired with wrestlers who had no trouble cutting their own promos. A notable example of this would be CM Punk, who was managed by Paul Heyman from 2012 to 2013. Punk had no trouble cutting his own promos, but Heyman would also cut his own promos alongside Punk in support of his client's act.

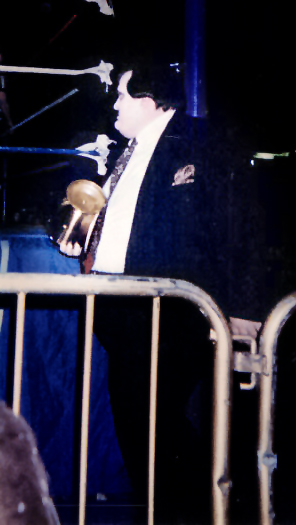
Paul Bearer carrying the urn he used to control The Undertaker

While the basic goal of a manager to give their wrestlers a push does not change, the tactics depend on several factors, especially alignment. Managers, when used judiciously, can completely change the tone and inner workings of a wrestling match. A heel manager, for example, may instruct their clients to constantly duck tougher opponents or interfere in their matches to secure a win by cheating. A face manager, on the other hand, may spend the majority of their interview time talking about how tough their client is and going out of their way to find bigger and better opponents to challenge, or rally the audience to chant and cheer in support of their client during matches. Often the very act of aligning with a manager, or conversely breaking away from a manager they've worked with, can change a wrestler's alignment, making them a sudden fan favourite face or a heel.

Certain wrestlers employ a specific kind of manager known as a "handler". If a wrestler's character calls for it, a handler is the only person who can manage the behavior of a "wild" wrestler who is prone to "go out of control". A classic example of this was The Undertaker, who in his early Deadman persona could only be controlled by Paul Bearer, through an urn which was said to have all of the Undertaker's powers. A legitimate example is Arnold Skaaland, who not only managed Andre The Giant for a time but was once assigned by promoter Vince McMahon Sr. as his real life handler. Skaaland was responsible for keeping Andre, known for his alcoholism, out of serious trouble and to ensure that he would reach a venue in time to wrestle a scheduled match.

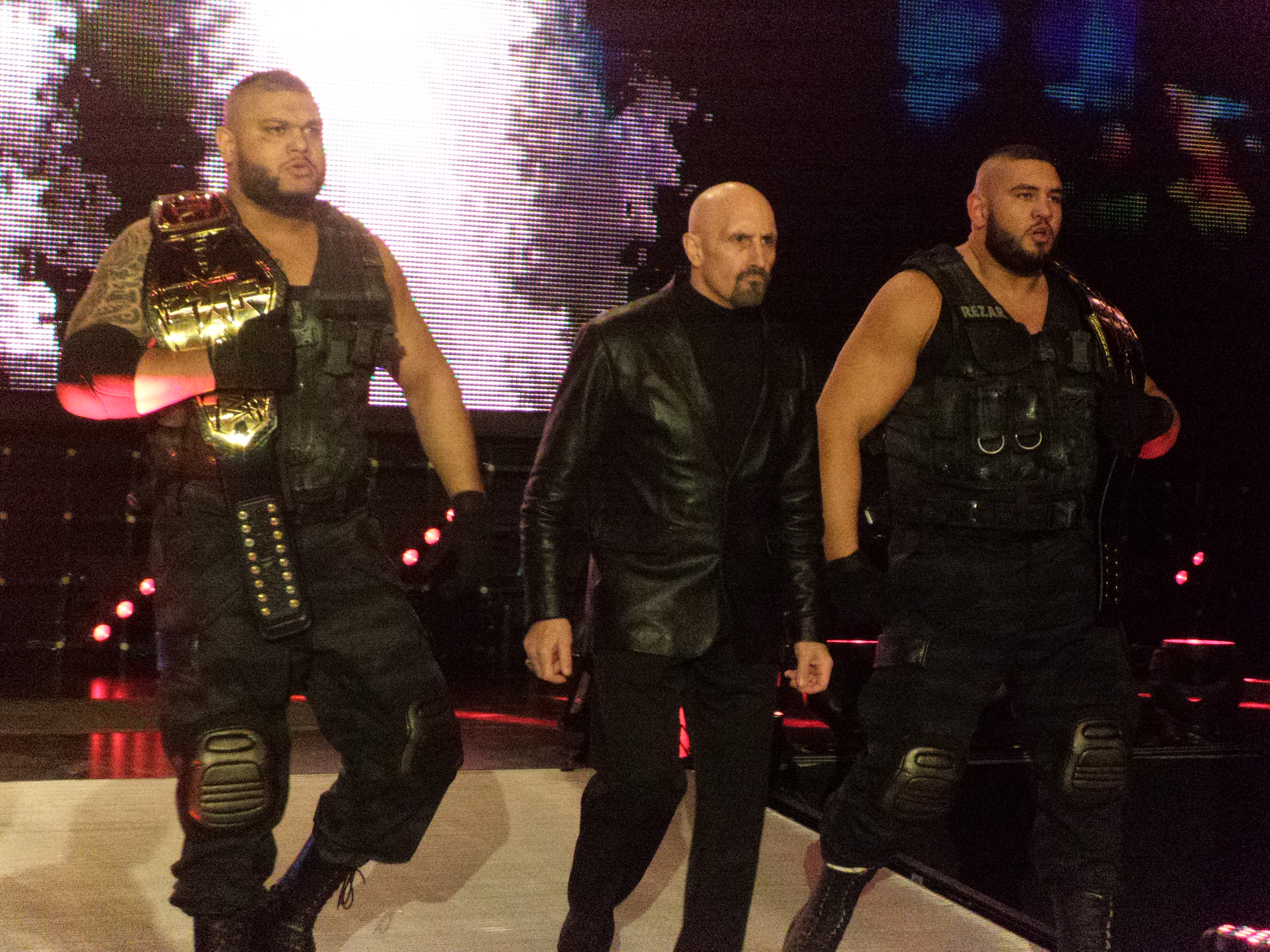
Paul Ellering (center) managing The Authors of Pain

A few managers, like Paul Ellering, are legitimate managers in the truest sense of the word, taking care of the day-to-day needs of their clients by dealing with travel arrangements, rentals, lodgings and even contractual negotiations. Others, such as Jim Cornette or Gary Hart, participate as real-life bookers and/or road agents for their promotions behind the scenes while performing concurrently as managers.

== History ==
In the early years of pro wrestling, the vast majority of professional wrestling managers were men, and female managers were rare. A number of prominent women like Miss Elizabeth, Sherri Martel and Woman made their debuts during the 1980s professional wrestling boom and went on to have storied careers in several wrestling promotions as wrestling managers.

Up until the mid-1990s, managers were very common because they served a secondary purpose: "getting heat". During the territorial era, most managers did not travel from territory to territory, but instead remained in one territory to provide instant heat to the promotion's new heel acts. Notable examples include "The Mouth of The South" Jimmy Hart in Memphis, Bobby "The Brain" Heenan in the American Wrestling Association, Sunny and the "Three Wise Men" (Lou Albano, Freddie Blassie, and The Grand Wizard) in the World Wide Wrestling Federation (now the WWE).

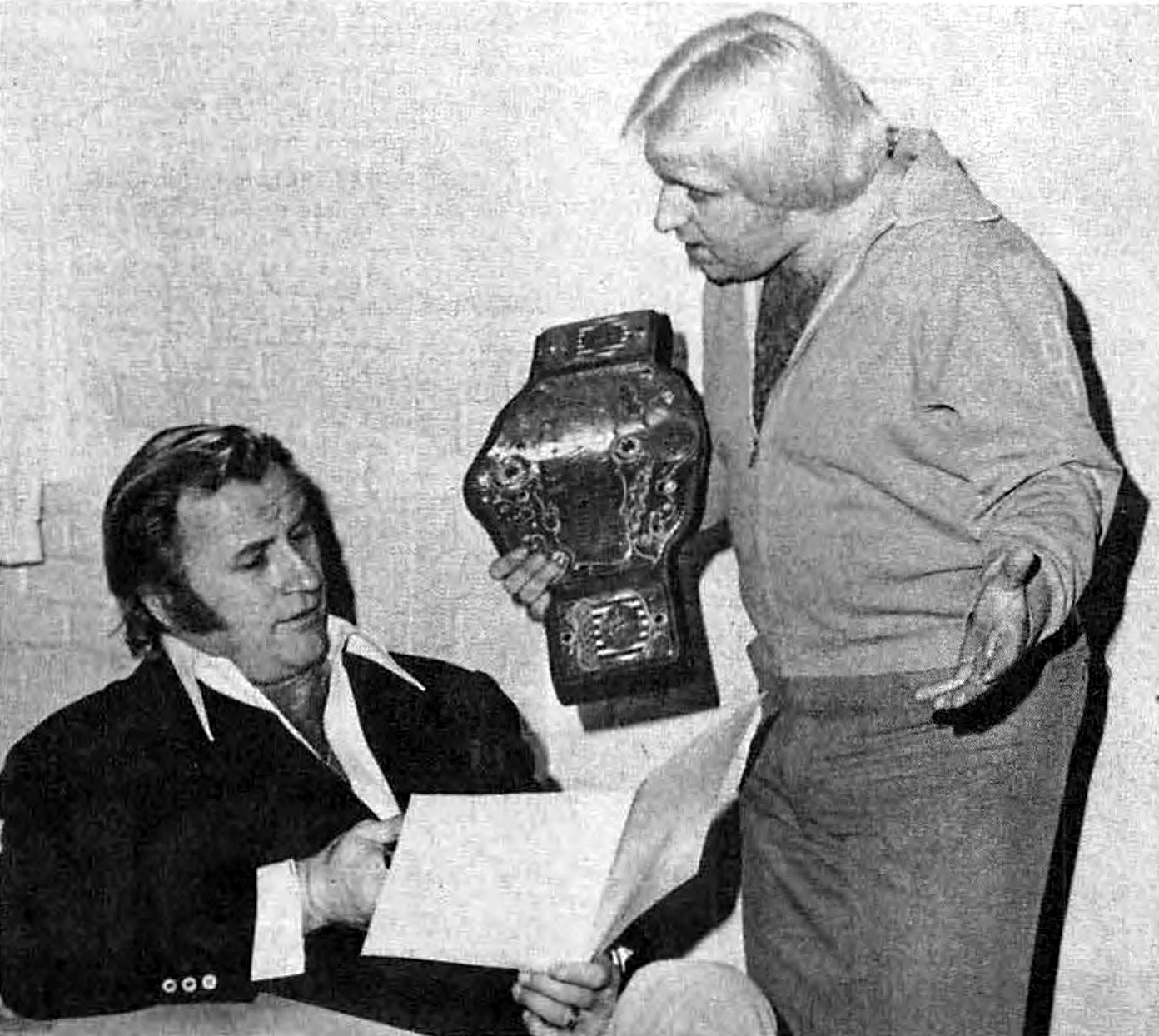
AWA World Heavyweight Champion Nick Bockwinkel with longtime manager Bobby Heenan

By the 2000s, major promotions like the WWE have favoured elevating the careers of wrestlers who are able to speak for themselves. As a result, the previously ubiquitous role of a manager has declined in favor of either female valets who occasionally get involved in wrestling matches, or by people who hold on-screen power as General Managers, Commissioners or various corporate officer positions. However, contemporary wrestling personalities such as Paul Heyman and Vickie Guerrero have demonstrated that managers are still effective at drawing heat, and when used judiciously, are capable of changing the tone and inner workings of a wrestling match by contributing drama and tension.

== Nomenclature ==
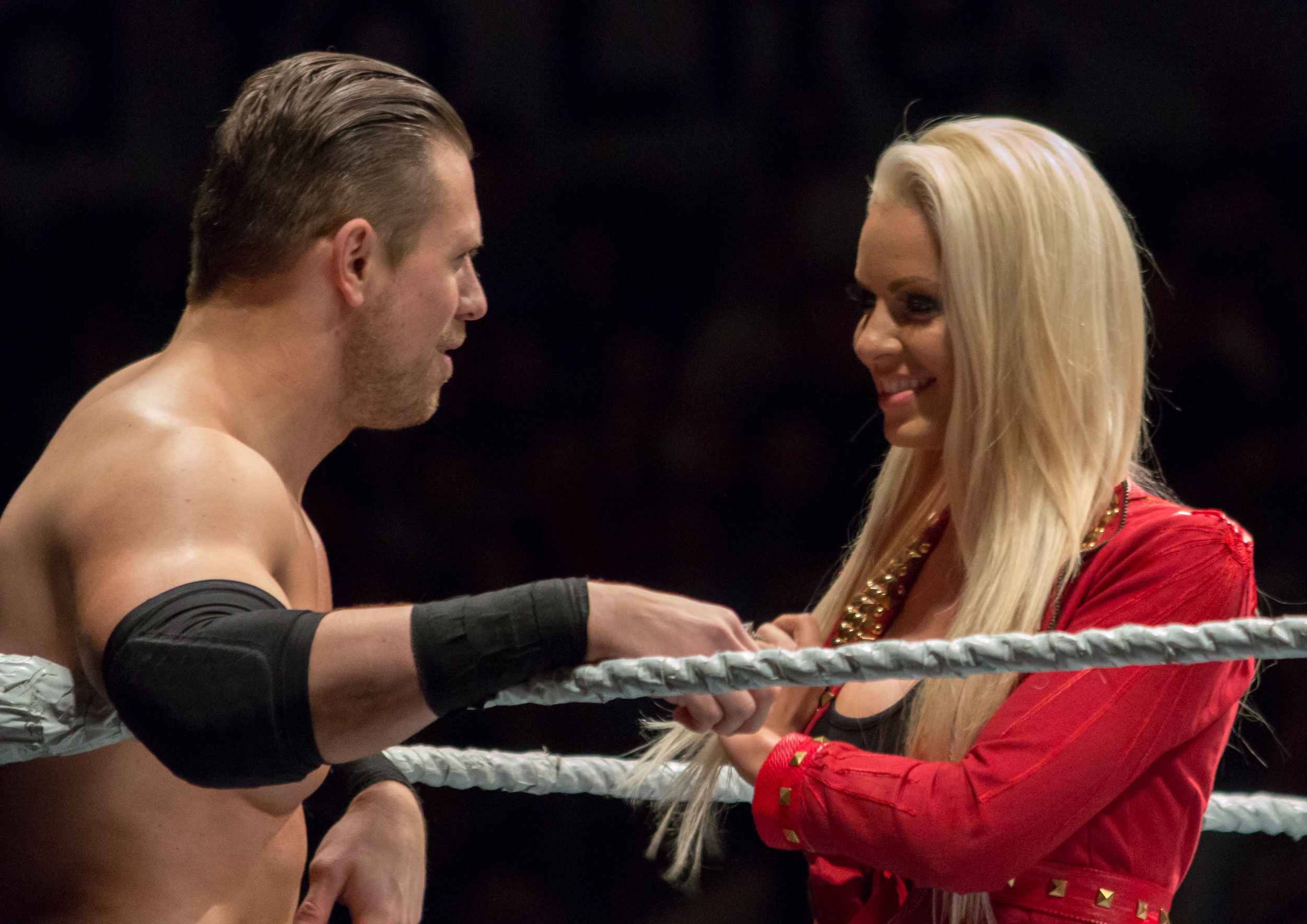
Maryse depicted as a manager or valet for The Miz, her real-life husband

Although "manager" and "valet" are terms sometimes used interchangeably for a woman who accompanies a wrestler to the ring, a major point of difference is that the former is specifically depicted as a professional spokesperson who crafts and/or guides a wrestler's career, while the latter may serve as little more than eye candy and/or as a distraction to opposing wrestlers or referees.

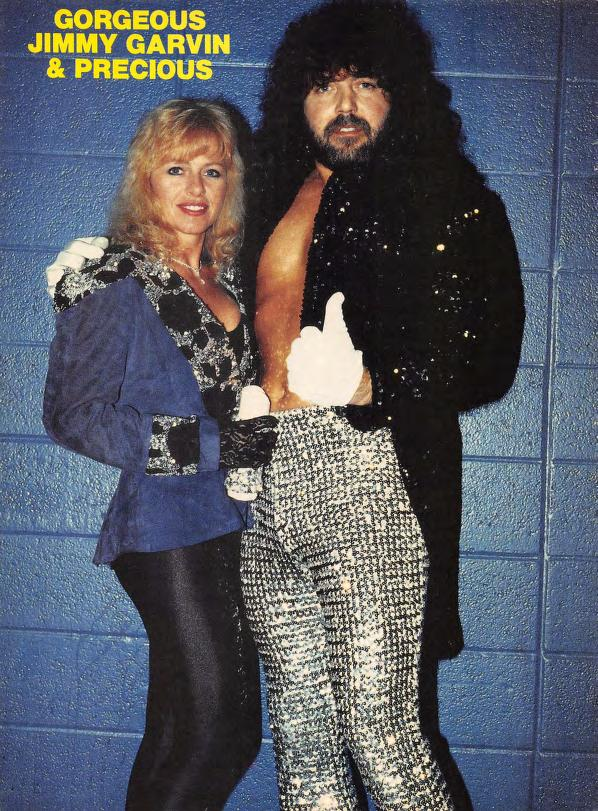
Precious managed her real-life husband, Jimmy Garvin, throughout his career

The role of a valet is a significant part of professional wrestling history, at least within the context of North American industry. Historically, North American women wrestlers often received less attention or recognition compared to their male counterparts and often did not enjoy the same exposure compared to their Japanese or Mexican counterparts. As a result, the purpose of a valet role is to provide female talent more opportunities as well as visibility within the industry. It is thought that a valet, by virtue of her presence and/or the dynamics of her relationship with her associated wrestler, could contribute an element that amplifies their personas and get their act over. Many valets are not required to cut promos on their associated wrestler's behalf and generally have rather passive roles, since their physical appearance tend to be emphasized at the exclusion of all other traits; other valets may deviate from convention and assert a dominant role over their wrestlers, if their characters call for it.

In spite of their limited wrestling ability, perceived or otherwise, valets are more likely to participate in the occasional wrestling match in comparison to managers, and are frequently booked in mixed tag team matches against rival valets and their associated wrestlers as part of storyline angles. There are also numerous examples of female performers in the wrestling industry who started off as valets and went on to be recognized as marquee competitors in their own right, such as Lita, Trish Stratus, and The Fabulous Moolah.

Male supporting characters who fit the original definition of a valet are uncommon in professional wrestling; a recent example was Ricardo Rodriguez, who performed as Alberto Del Rio's on-screen attendant and personal ring announcer during his tenure in the WWE. A male performer who accompanies a prominent female wrestler to the ring could be considered a valet as well, though this is exceptionally rare.

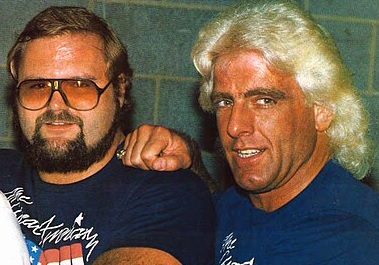
Arn Anderson is known for his work as Ric Flair's enforcer.

While they are not managers in the traditional sense, enforcers—full-time wrestlers who accompany another wrestler to the ring—also serve both in and out of storylines to further the interests of a wrestler in their care. They are named after Arn Anderson's nickname, The Enforcer, whose career has been highlighted by his association with Ric Flair and various members of The Four Horsemen stable. Enforcers appear in storylines where wrestlers need to have their back watched by keeping outside interference from taking place in a match, to serve as outside interference themselves, or to further a storyline without actually recording a real match by defending their associates from ambushes outside the ring by other wrestlers. The Acolytes Protection Agency (APA) had a unique gimmick where instead of a long-term association with one wrestler, tag team or stable, they would be hired by different wrestlers each week to act as their bodyguards or to prevent outside interference.

== See also ==
- List of professional wrestling managers and valets
