= Aldo Bogni =

Argentine wrestler (1915–1997)

Personal information
- Born: Aldo Edmundo Bogni; 29 January 1915 Buenos Aires, Argentina
- Died: 10 March 1997 (aged 82)

Professional wrestling career
- Ring name(s): Aldo Bogni; Argentina Bogni; Bronco Corleone; Don Aldo Bogni; The Scorpion; Super Pro; Super Protege
- Billed height: 6 ft 3 in (1.91 m)
- Billed weight: 261 lb (118 kg)
- Trained by: Bill Anderson
- Debut: 1951
- Retired: 1971

Aldo Edmundo Bogni (January 29, 1915 – March 10, 1997) was an Argentinian professional wrestler. He was active during the 1950s to the 1970s.

== Career ==
Bogni was born in Buenos Aires on January 19, 1915. He began wrestling in the 1950s in the Northeastern United States, before moving to NWA San Francisco, and NWA Hollywood Wrestling. During 1959, he began appearing at NWA Capitol Wrestling (which would later become the WWE), before debuting at Jim Crockett Promotions where he would remain for the rest of his career. He also worked for American Wrestling Association in Minnesota and Championship Wrestling from Florida. He retired from wrestling in 1971.

== Championships and accomplishments ==
- American Wrestling Association
  - AWA North Dakota Heavyweight Championship (2 times)
- Championship Wrestling from Florida
  - NWA Florida Southern Tag Team Championship (2 times) — with Bronko Lubich
- Georgia Championship Wrestling
  - NWA Georgia Southern Heavyweight Championship (1 time)
- Jim Crockett Promotions
  - NWA Mid-Atlantic Southern Tag Team Championship (2 times) — with Bronko Lubich
- Sam Menacker Promotions
  - NWA Southwestern Tag Team Championship (El Paso version) (1 time) — with Wee Willie Davis
- Stampede Wrestling
  - Stampede International Tag Team Championship (1 time) — with Alexis Bruga

== Luchas de Apuestas record ==
| Winner (wager) | Loser (wager) | Location | Event | Date | Notes |
|---|---|---|---|---|---|
| Dory Funk | The Scorpion (mask) | Amarillo, Texas | Live event | June 1, 1961 | |
| Super Pro and The Assassins (Assassin #1 and Assassin #2) | Mario Galento and The Super Assailants (Super Assailant #1 and Super Assailant #2) (mask) | Atlanta, Georgia | Live event | September 26, 1969 | |
| Tex McKenzie, Louie Tillet and The Professional (mask) | Super Pro and The Assassins (Assassin #1 and Assassin #2) (mask) | Atlanta, Georgia | Live event | October 17, 1969 | |
