= Ripper Collins (wrestler) =

American professional wrestler (1933–1991)

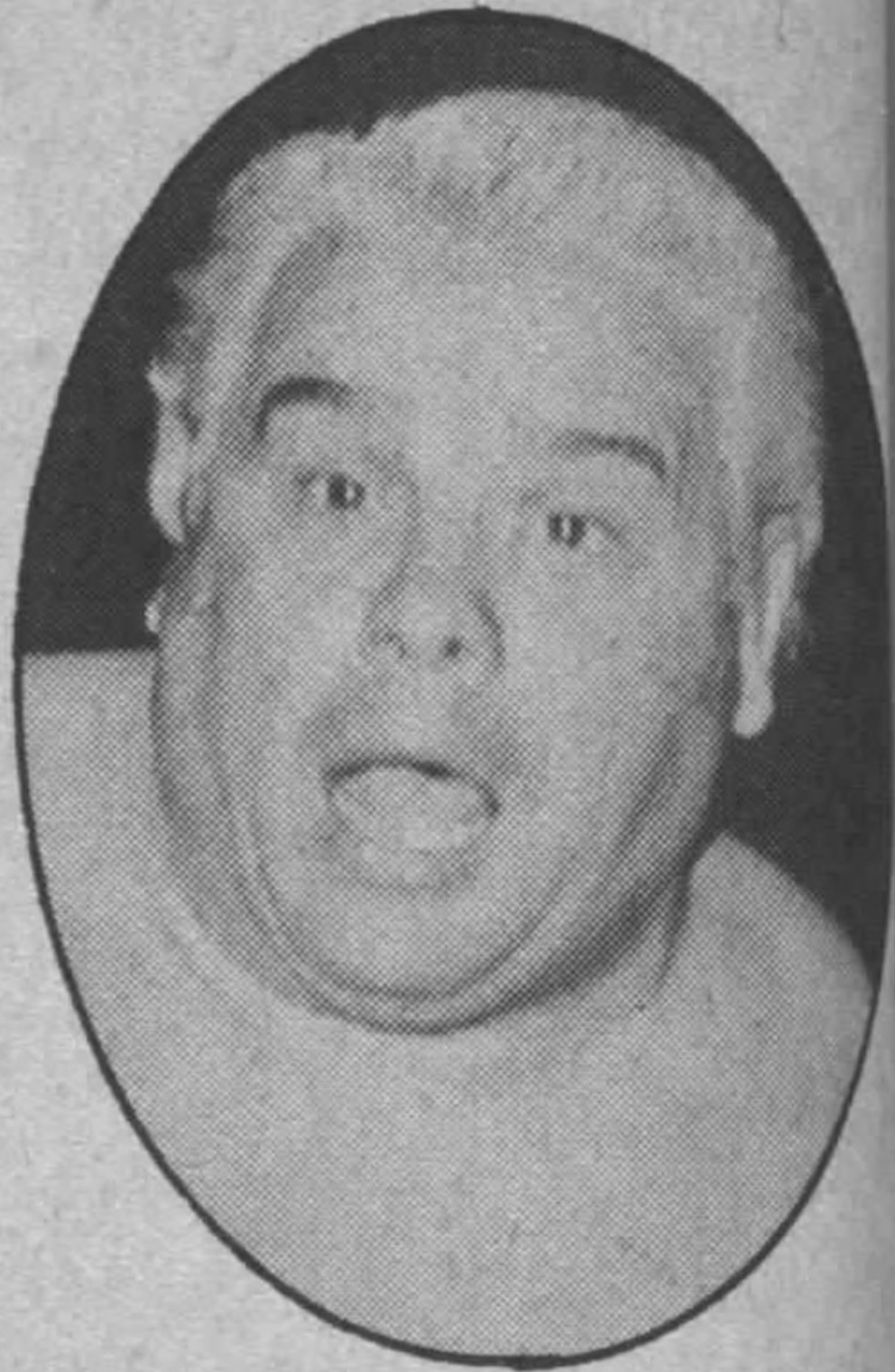
- Collins in 1973

Personal information
- Born: Roy Lee Albern; October 8, 1933 Muskogee, Oklahoma, U.S.
- Died: November 12, 1991 (aged 58) Oahu, Hawaii, U.S.

Professional wrestling career
- Ring name(s): Leroy Collins; Masked Monster; Pretty Boy Collins; Ripper Collins; Roy Nelson
- Billed height: 5"11 (180 cm)
- Billed weight: 264 lb (120 kg)
- Debut: 1957
- Retired: 1980

Roy Lee Albern (October 10, 1933 – November 12, 1991), known by the ring name Ripper Collins, was an American professional wrestler, who primarily wrestled for 50th State Big Time Wrestling, also known as NWA Hawaii.

== Professional wrestling career ==
Collins started his wrestling career in Texas, before going to St. Louis. In 1961, he made his debut in the American Wrestling Association (AWA), where he stayed until 1963.

=== NWA Hawaii (1965–1979) ===
He made his debut for 50th State Big Time Wrestling in 1965, finding success there for most of his career as a heel, and would often compete in mixed tag team matches with his wife Barbara. He would also dub himself as "The King". On January 4, 1966, Collins and Johnny Barend defeated Bearcat Wright and Luther Lindsay to win the NWA Hawaii Tag Team Championship, holding them until Neff Maiava & Pampero Firpo defeated them for the belts in early November. In December, Collins was involved in a miscommunication with his manager Beauregarde, who hit Collins by accident instead of his opponent; Barend came to calm him down, but they engaged in an argument and the two started fighting, ending their partnership. He won the titles for a second time with King Curtis Iaukea on May 3, 1967, but dropped them two months later to Barend and Jim Hady.

Collins would hold the tag team titles twelve more times with different partners including "Crazy" Luke Graham, Buddy Austin, Mad Dog Mayne, and Ed Francis. On November 28, 1973, Collins and Johnny Valentine won the titles by defeating Sam Steamboat and Peter Maivia, but the titles were then vacated and remained inactive until 1977. In 1978, Collins won the titles for the fourteenth and final time with Whipper Watson Jr. and dropped the titles in 1979.

On January 19, 1966, Collins defeated Ron Reed to win the NWA Hawaii Heavyweight Championship. In August, he dropped it to Neff Maivia and recaptured the title in October, before dropping it on March 15, 1967, to Jim Hady. On October 29, 1969, Collins won the championship from Pampero Firpo, and had reigns with the title over the next two years, whilst engaging in a feud with Sam Steamboat. He would drop the belt to his former partner Johnny Barend in December 1970, but he would defeat Barend a month later to win back the gold. He dropped the belt in his final reign to Frankie Laine on February 6, 1971.

Collins had his first reign with the NWA Pacific Northwest Heavyweight Championship on May 12, 1967, defeating Tony Borne, before dropping it to him later that month. He next held the title after defeating Jimmy Snuka on January 12, 1974, before losing it to him on February 23. However, on March 30, the title was vacated after a match with Snuka; he would win the vacated championship by defeating Snuka in a rematch on April 13, before yet again dropping it to Snuka on June 4. In 1979, Collins engaged in feuds with former tag team partner Ed Francis and Tor Kormata before leaving NWA Hawaii.

=== Later career (1976–1980) ===
In 1976, he wrestled for Stampede Wrestling in Calgary, where on February 20, Collins and Don Gagne defeated Ed and Jerry Morrow to win the Stampede Wrestling International Tag Team Championship; they held it until April 2, when they lost to Lumberjack Luke and Prince Tapu. However, Collins and Bobby Bass defeated Luke and Tapu a week later to win back the titles, before dropping them on May 7 to Gama Singh and Crary Stevenson. He last held the tag team titles with Larry Sharpe, which they had won from the Morrows on September 24, before dropping it back to them in October.

In 1980, Collins spent the final part of his career for NWA Polynesian Wrestling, winning the NWA Polynesian Pacific Heavyweight Championship. Despite retiring, he remained in the wrestling business, working for the South-Pac Wrestling Federation, an independent promotion based in Hawaii.

== Personal life ==
He was married to female wrestler Barbara Baker. The two had met in a diner in West Virginia, and together they had two daughters. Albern was openly homosexual, spending time in jail in Calgary and Louisiana for allegedly soliciting underage boys. Bret Hart recalled in his autobiography that Albern once molested a teenage hitchhiker, whom he had picked up while getting gas for Stu Hart's van, but the kid was able to fight him off.

Albern died at the Straub Hospital in Oahu, Hawaii on November 12, 1991, at the age of 58. He had been suffering from melanoma, a form of skin cancer which had started in his armpits.

== Championships and accomplishments ==
- 50th State Big Time Wrestling
  - NWA Hawaii Heavyweight Championship (8 times)
  - NWA Hawaii Tag Team Championship (14 times) – with Johnny Barend (3), King Curtis Iaukea (4), "Crazy" Luke Graham (1), Buddy Austin (1), Lonnie Mayne (2), Ed Francis (1), Johnny Valentine (1), and Whipper Watson Jr. (1)
- All Star Pro Wrestling
  - NWA Australasian Tag Team Championship (1 time) – with Larry O'Dea
- Dominion Wrestling Union
  - NWA British Empire/Commonwealth Championship (1 time)
- NWA Hollywood Wrestling
  - NWA "Beat the Champ" Television Championship (1 time)
- NWA Polynesian Wrestling
  - NWA Polynesian Pacific Heavyweight Championship (1 time)
- Pacific Northwest Wrestling
  - NWA Pacific Northwest Heavyweight Championship (3 times)
- Stampede Wrestling
  - Stampede Wrestling International Tag Team Championship (3 times) – with Don Gagne (1), Bobby Bass (1), and Larry Sharpe (1)
- World Championship Wrestling
  - IWA World Heavyweight Championship (1 time)
