= Sharpe Brothers =

Canadian professional wrestling team

Statistics
- Members: Ben Sharpe; Mike Sharpe
- Billed heights: Mike: 6 ft 5 in (1.96 m); Ben: 6 ft 6 in (1.98 m)
- Combined billed weight: 495 lb (225 kg)
- Hometown: Hamilton, Ontario, Canada
- Billed from: Hamilton, Ontario, Canada
- Years active: 1947–1960

The Sharpe Brothers were a Canadian professional wrestling tag team consisting of brothers Ben Sharpe and Mike Sharpe, best known for their tenures wrestling in the territories of Northern California and Japan. Both men were tall in stature with athletic backgrounds (Ben was an Olympian with the Canadian rowing team in 1936) and served in the Royal Air Force during World War II. While both were stationed in England, they discovered professional wrestling and set about entering the profession soon thereafter. In pursuit, they travelled to San Francisco after the war and rose to prominence in promoter Joe Malcewicz's territory as both singles and tag team wrestlers.

In the mid-1950s, the Sharpe Brothers also began competing for Rikidozan's newly formed Japan Wrestling Association, becoming one of the most revered tag teams in Japanese history. Mike continued to wrestle as a single's competitor after Ben's retirement and his son "Iron" Mike Sharpe, Jr. entered the business as well. The Sharpe Brothers are remembered as a tag team that was able to rise to headline status in an established and respected territory and also helping to establish a new one (in Japan). The duo have been inducted into various Halls of Fame, including the Professional Wrestling Hall of Fame and Museum, Class of 2010.

== Early life ==
Ben Sharpe (18 March 1916 – 21 November 2001) was six when his brother Mike (11 July 1922 – 11 August 1988) was born. Their father was a detective sergeant with the Hamilton City Police force and they had four sisters. Both Sharpe brothers attended Westdale Secondary School in Hamilton, Ontario and were accomplished athletes, particularly Ben who had competed in the 1936 Summer Olympics as part of the Canadian rowing team,. Ben would write home to his family regularly and warned that he felt a war was brewing in Europe. Ben had also worked for an elevator company in Hamilton. At the outbreak of World War II, both brothers enlisted in the Canadian armed forces. Ben has originally enlisted in the Royal Canadian Air Force but at 6'5" he was too large to fit into a cockpit and was instead stationed in England as a physical fitness instructor. Mike entered the Royal Canadian Airforce when he met the age requirement and, again due to his size, he was tasked with being an armourer, often loading bombs onto planes.

== Professional wrestling career ==
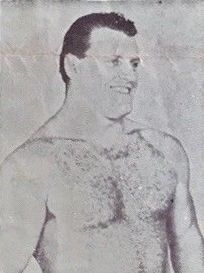
Mike Sharpe in 1962

=== England and Hamilton ===
Ben had already dipped his toes in the wrestling business briefly back in Hamilton and when Mike arrived in England Ben saw potential to pursue a career as a tag team with his brother. The brothers met Lord James Blears while stationed in England and began wrestling during the war. At the end of the war, Mike and Ben returned to their native Canada and wrestled in Ontario before relocating to San Francisco.

=== Northern California ===
Working for promoters Frank and Joe Malcewicz, the Sharpe Brothers became the stars of the territory. They captured their first NWA World Tag Team Championship on 9 May 1950, defeating Hard Boiled Haggerty & Ray Eckert. They dominated the tag team scene for the next decade, winning the NWA World Tag Team Championship there on 18 occasions. Ben also captured the NWA Hawaii Heavyweight Championship during this time, defeating Bobby Managoff on 23 August 1953. "Had I been in a position of power in any territory, they would have been my main eventers...they were just fantastic," Bob Orton Sr. remarked on the Sharpes in 2002. The brothers were mainstays in the San Francisco territory and primarily performed there for a decade. "Joe Malcewicz had them pretty well tied up" Gene Kiniski said of their tenure in San Francisco, "they...kept feeding them different talent."

=== Various NWA territories ===
While Northern California became their home territory, the brothers also captured championship in other promotions, particularly St. Louis and their native Hamilton, Ontario. They won NWA Tag Team gold for NWA Chicago on 17 October 1953 and for NWA Indianapolis on 16 September 1951.

=== Japan ===
The California territories offered access to Japan for those who could draw crowds and the Sharpe Brothers took up this opportunity when Japanese promoters came asking. Television was a relatively new medium in Japan in 1954 with few Japanese people owning a television set. In February 1954 Rikidozan and Masahiko Kimura faced the Sharpe Brothers, which was seen by millions via Japanese TV, with many people viewing in front of shop windows. As televisions became more affordable, Rikidozan capitalised on this and established himself as one of the country's first true TV stars. The Sharpe Brothers became the popular "foreign" team and were regularly interviewed on Japanese TV, even into their retirements. Both men appreciated Japanese culture and one of Ben's children, Riki, was named in honour of Rikidozan.

=== Ben's retirement ===
In 1962, Ben retired from the wrestling business and Mike continued to wrestle, working for promotions he previously had not done as a tag team. He captured titles after Ben's retirement, including the NWA (San Francisco) Pacific Coast Heavyweight title in 1960, the WWA International Television Tag titles in 1961 and the All Asia Tag Team titles in 1962.

=== Later years ===
After retiring from in-ring competition, Ben entered into various business ventures, including opening a bar in San Francisco and a restaurant in Colma. The wear and tear he accumulated from his wrestling career took their toll on Ben however and he used a wheelchair for the last 14 years of his life. After contracting a leg infection and developing a fever, Ben went to bed at his son Michael's home in Kingsburg on 21 November 2001 and died in his sleep at the age of 85. He had six children.

Mike wrestled his last match in 1964. After his in-ring career, he got into brewing for Anheuser-Busch in Van Nuys. He also became self-taught in welding, putting together small wrestling rings for children. Ben's brother-in-law Jake Isbister has commented on Mike's charity, stating that he "was generous to a fault. Anyone with a hard-luck story could count on him for a meal and a bed".

Wrestling wear and tear caught up with Mike as it did Ben and he suffered various ailments in his later years. While on his way to his sister-in-law's funeral in Palo Alto on 11 August 1988 Mike had a heart attack and died at 66 years of age. His son, Mike Jr., better known as "Iron" Mike Sharpe, would later join Vince McMahon's nationally expanding World Wrestling Federation.

== Championships and accomplishments ==
- 50th State Big Time Wrestling
  - NWA Hawaii Heavyweight Championship (Ben)
- Big Time Wrestling (Vancouver)
  - NWA British Empire Heavyweight Championship (1 time) - (Mike)
- Canadian Wrestling Hall of Fame
  - Tag team inductees
- Fred Kohler Enterprises
  - NWA World Tag Team Championship (1 time)
  - NWA (San Francisco) Pacific Coast Tag Team Championship (one time)
- Japan Wrestling Association
  - All Asia Tag Team Championship (1 time) - Mike (with Buddy Austin)
- NWA Indianapolis
  - NWA World Tag Team Championship (1 time)
- NWA San Francisco
  - NWA World Tag Team Championship (18 times)
  - NWA World Tag Team Championship (2 times) Ben with James Blears (1) and Red Hangman (1)
  - NWA (San Francisco) Pacific Coast Heavyweight Championship (Mike, 3 times)
  - NWA (San Francisco) Pacific Coast Heavyweight Championship (Ben, 1 time)
- NWA Southwest
  - NWA Texas Tag Team Championship (1 time)
- Wrestling Observer Newsletter
  - Wrestling Observer Newsletter Hall of Fame (Class of 2017)
- Worldwide Wrestling Associates
  - WWA International Television Tag Team Championship (1 time) - Mike with Zebra Kid
- Professional Wrestling Hall of Fame and Museum
  - Class of 2010
