= Ripper Collins =

Ripper Collins may refer to:

- Ripper Collins (baseball)
- Ripper Collins (wrestler)
