= Jim Hady =

American professional wrestler (1930–1969)

Personal information
- Born: John Hady; May 30, 1930 Pittsburgh, Pennsylvania, U.S.
- Died: January 13, 1969 (aged 38) Honolulu, Hawaii, U.S.

Professional wrestling career
- Ring name(s): Dutch Schultz; Jim Hady
- Billed height: 5 ft 10 in (178 cm)
- Billed weight: 238 lb (108 kg)
- Trained by: Dutch Savage
- Debut: 1951

John Hady (May 30, 1930 – January 13, 1969) was an American professional wrestler, better known by the ring name "Gentleman" Jim Hady. During his wrestling career he mainly worked in Hawaii for 50th State Big Time Wrestling.

== Professional wrestling career ==
Hady started his professional wrestling career in Hawaii in 1951. During his career, he worked in Ohio, Calgary, Germany in 1959, England in 1962 and Detroit.

In 1960, he made his debut for American Wrestling Association in Minnesota. Then worked in Canada for Toronto's Maple Leaf Wrestling and Vancouver's NWA All-Star Wrestling.

In 1964, he worked in New York City for World Wide Wrestling Federation.

In 1966, Hady returned to Hawaii's 50th State Big Time Wrestling where he became a star. He became a two time NWA Hawaii Heavyweight Champion and five time NWA Hawaii Tag Team Champion. He defeated Ripper Collins for the NWA Hawaii Heavyweight Championship on March 15, 1967.

== Death ==
On January 13, 1969, Hady was in a six-man tag team match with James Blears and Tex McKenzie in Honolulu when he suffered a massive heart attack and collapsed. Medical staff at the arena tried to revive Hady but he died. He was 38.

== Championships and accomplishments ==
- 50th State Big Time Wrestling
  - NWA Hawaii Heavyweight Championship (2 times)
  - NWA Hawaii Tag Team Championship (5 times) – with Johnny Barend (2), Pampero Firpo (1), Peter Maivia (1) and Billy White Wolf (1)
  - NWA North American Heavyweight Championship (Hawaii version) (2 times)
- Alex Turk Promotions
  - NWA International Tag Team Championship (Winnipeg version) (1 time) – with Don Leo Jonathan (1)
- All-Star Wrestling
  - NWA Canadian Tag Team Championship (Vancouver version) (2 times) – with Don Leo Jonathan (1) and Red Bastien
- Cauliflower Alley Club
  - Other honoree (2004)
- Maple Leaf Wrestling
  - NWA International Tag Team Championship (Toronto version) (1 time) – with Johnny Valentine (1)
- Midwest Wrestling Association
  - MWA World Junior Heavyweight Championship (2 times)

== See also ==
- List of premature professional wrestling deaths
