= The Wild Bull of the Pampas =

Wild Bull of the Pampas may refer to:

- Luis Ángel Firpo (1894–1960), an Argentine boxer
- Pampero Firpo (1930–2020), an Armenian-American professional wrestler
- Vince Karalius (1932–2008), an English rugby league footballer
