= Neff Maiava =

American professional wrestler (1924–2018)

Personal information
- Born: Neff Alfred Maiava; May 1, 1924 Tula, Tutuila, American Samoa
- Died: April 21, 2018 (aged 93) Honolulu, Hawaii, United States
- Children: 9
- Family: Kaluka Maiava (grandson)

Professional wrestling career
- Ring name(s): Big Head Maiava; Neff Maiava; Prince Maiava; Prince Ulu Maiava
- Billed height: 6 ft 0 in (183 cm)
- Billed weight: 282 lb (128 kg)
- Billed from: "Samoa"
- Trained by: Al Karasik
- Debut: 1952
- Retired: 1974

Neff Alfred Maiava (May 1, 1924 – April 21, 2018) was an American Samoan professional wrestler. He is best known for his appearances in the United States with the Honolulu, Hawaii-based promotion 50th State Big Time Wrestling in the late-1950s and 1960s.

== Early life ==
Maiava was born in Tula in American Samoa on May 1, 1924. When he was two years old, his family relocated to Laie, Hawaii, in the United States.

== Professional wrestling career ==
Maiava was trained to wrestle by Al Karasik, debuting in 1952. In 1955, he wrestled for Ed Don George in Syracuse, New York, as "Prince Ulu Maiava". From 1955 to 1958, he wrestled in Canada for the Calgary, Alberta-based Big Time Wrestling promotion as "Prince Maiava". In 1956, he briefly held the NWA Texas Tag Team Championship with Ray Gunkel while working for the Dallas Wrestling Club in Dallas, Texas. In 1958, Maiava began wrestling for the Salt Lake City, Utah-based Salt Lake Wrestling Club, where he and Oni Wiki Wiki briefly held the NWA World Tag Team Championship. In late-1960, he briefly wrestled for the World Wide Wrestling Federation in Washington, D.C.

Maiava became a highly popular wrestler due to his "combination of athletic ability, comedy and exotic flair". Playing on his Samoan origin, Maiava developed a "colorful and charismatic" character. He became known for antics such as performing fire knife dances, playing a ukulele, walking on a bed of nails, breaking wooden boards over his head, and wearing a necklace made from boar's teeth. During his matches, Maiava would use his wild hair to entrap and "cut" opponents' hands. His finishing move, the "Coconut Head-butt", gave rise to the professional wrestling trope that Samoan wrestlers have "hard heads". He was managed by Coconut Willie, who supposedly issued orders to Maiava by beating a drum. On one occasion, he wrestled a bear. To preserve the mystique of his character, Maiava did not speak English in public while travelling outside of Hawaii.

In the late-1950s, Maiava began appearing regularly with the Honolulu, Hawaii-based promotion 50th State Big Time Wrestling. Between 1961 and 1966, he held the NWA Hawaii Heavyweight Championship on six occasions, trading the championship with wrestlers including King Curtis Iaukea, Gene LeBell, Hard Boiled Haggerty, and Gene Kiniski. He also held the NWA Hawaii Tag Team Championship on six occasions, teaming with Billy White Wolf, Lord James Blears, and Pampero Firpo. On August 16, 1961, Maiava defended his NWA Hawaii Heavyweight Championship in a bout with King Curtis Iaukea at the Civic Auditorium in front of approximately 3,000 people. After Iaukea won, members of the audience began rioting, with eight people ultimately arrested and nine people (including four police officers) injured. In October 1961, Maiava defeated Maurice Vachon in a hair versus hair match. Fellow American Samoan professional wrestler Fanene Anderson took his ring name, Peter Maivia, from Maiava. In 1968, Maiava and Maivia formed a tag team in 50th State Big Time Wrestling.

Maiava retired from professional wrestling in 1974. He went on to run a tree-trimming company and purchased a portfolio of rental properties on Oahu.

== Personal life ==
Maiava had five sons and four daughters. His grandchildren included American football linebacker Kaluka Maiava.

In 1997, Maiava published "Da Grouchy Moocher Boogie Man", a children's book.

== Death ==
Maiava died in his sleep on April 21, 2018, in Honolulu at the age of 93. At the time of his death he was reckoned by journalist Dave Meltzer to be the world's second oldest living professional wrestler. He was inurned with military honors at the Diamond Head Mortuary.

== Bibliography ==
- Da Grouchy Moocher Boogie Man (1997)

== Championships and accomplishments ==
- 50th State Big Time Wrestling
  - NWA Hawaii Heavyweight Championship (6 times)
  - NWA Hawaii Tag Team Championship (6 times) – with Billy White Wolf (1 time), Lord James Blears (4 times), and Pampero Firpo (1 time)
- Dallas Wrestling Club
  - NWA Texas Tag Team Championship (1 time) – with Ray Gunkel
- Salt Lake Wrestling Club
  - NWA World Tag Team Championship (Salt Lake Wrestling Club version) (1 time) – with Oni Wiki Wiki
