= NWA World Tag Team Championship (Chicago version) =

Professional wrestling tag team championship

Details
- Promotion: Fred Kohler Enterprises
- Date established: 1953
- Date retired: August 1960
Statistics
- First champions: Lord James Blears and Lord Athol Layton
- Most reigns: Nicolai and Boris Volkoff (4 reigns)
- Longest reign: Reggie Lisowski and Art Neilson (371 days)
- Shortest reign: (Note: Several reigns have unknown length, it is impossible to determine who had the shortest)

The Chicago version of the NWA World Tag Team Championship was a professional wrestling championship promoted by the Chicago-based Fred Kohler Enterprises, a member of the National Wrestling Alliance (NWA). The championship was for two-man tag teams only. While the NWA Board of Directors mandated that there would only be one NWA World Heavyweight Championship, they did not regulate the use of championships labeled "NWA World Tag Team Championship", allowing any member that so desired to create their own local version. As a result, as many as 13 different, regional versions were active in 1957, the highest number of active NWA World Tag Team Championships in existence at the same time.^{[Championships]}

The championship was introduced in 1953 when the promoters awarded the championship to Lord James Blears and Lord Athol Layton. The championship was promoted from 1953 until 1960 when Fred Kohler left the NWA to help form the American Wrestling Association (AWA) and thus the AWA World Tag Team Championship became the top tag team championship in the Chicago area. The Chicago promotion would later be bought by Dick Afflis, who merged it with his Indianapolis-based territory. The last NWA World Tag Team Championship was won by the Shires brothers, Roy and Ray, on April 9, 1960. The Volkoffs, Boris and Nicoli, held the championship four times, the record for the Chicago version of the NWA World Tag Team Championship. Art Neilson and Reggie Lisowski held the championship for 371 days, the longest individual reign in the championship's seven-year history. Being a professional wrestling championship, it is not won or lost competitively, but instead determined by the decision of the bookers of a wrestling promotion. The title is awarded after the chosen team "wins" a match to maintain the illusion that professional wrestling is a competitive sport.

== Title history ==
Key

No.	The overall championship reign
Reign	The reign number for the specific wrestler listed.
Event	The event promoted by the respective promotion in which the title changed hands
N/A	The specific information is not known
—	Used for vacated reigns in order to not count it as an official reign
	Indicates that there was a period where the lineage is undocumented due to the lack of written documentation in that time period.

No.	Champions	Reign	Date	Days held	Location	Event	Notes	Ref(s)
1	Lord James Blears and Lord Athol Layton	1	1953	(Note: The exact date Blears and Layton were awarded the championship is unknown, which means their reign lasted between 1 day and 205 days.)	N/A	N/A	Awarded	
2	Bill Melby and Billy Darnell	1	July 25, 1953	84	Chicago, Illinois	live event	Defeated Blears and Martino Angelo who substituted Layton who had suffered an injury.	
3	Ben and Mike Sharpe	1	October 17, 1953	(Note: The exact date the Sharp brothers left the company is unknown, which means their reign lasted between 1 day and 75 days.)	Chicago, Illinois	live event		
—	Vacated	—	1953	N/A	N/A	N/A	Vacated when the Sharpe brothers stop working for the company	
4	Bill Melby and Billy Darnell	2	1954	(Note: The exact date Melby and Darnell were awarded the championship is unknown, which means their reign lasted between 1 day and 43 days.)	live event	(Note: The location of the match was not captured as part of the documentation.)	Melby and Darnell were awarded the championship.	
5	Reggie Lisowski and Art Neilson	1	February 13, 1954	371	live event		Defeated Melby and Jack Witzig who substituted for an injured Darnell	
6	Pat O'Connor and Roy McClarity	1	March 19, 1955	(Note: The exact date O'Connor and McClarity lost the championship is unknown, which means their reign lasted between 319 and 325 days.)	Moline, Illinois	live event		
7	Guy Brunetti and Joe Tangara	1	February 1956	(Note: The exact date Brunetti and Tangara won the championship is unknown, which means their reign lasted between 1 day and 17 days.)	live event			
8	Mike DiBiase and Danny Plechas	1	February 18, 1956	(Note: The exact date Dibiase and Plechas won the championship is unknown, which means their reign lasted between 12 and 42 days.)	Moline, Illinois	live event		
9	Reggie and Stan Lisowski	1	March 1956	(Note: The exact date the championship was is unknown, which means their reign lasted between 1 day and 246 days.)	live event			
—	Vacated	—	1956	N/A	N/A	N/A	Championship vacated for undocumented reasons	
10	Bobby Bruns and Roy McClarity	1	November 3, 1956	(Note: The exact date the championship was vacated is unknown, which means their reign lasted between 1 day and 21 days.)	live event	Des Moines, Iowa	Won the championship in a match against Nicolai and Boris Volkoff	
—	Vacated	—	November 1956	N/A	N/A	N/A	Championship vacated for undocumented reasons	
11	Nicolai and Boris Volkoff	1	November 24, 1956	(Note: The exact date The Volkoffs lost the championship is unknown, which means their reign lasted between 7 and 20 days.)	Milwaukee, Wisconsin	live event	Won the vacant championship in a match against Reggie and Stan Lisowski	
12	Reggie and Stan Lisowski	2	December 1956	(Note: The exact date the Lisowskis lost the championship is unknown, which means their reign lasted between 1 day and 15 days.)		live event		
13	Nicolai and Boris Volkoff	2	December 15, 1956	161	Milwaukee, Wisconsin	live event		
14	Verne Gagne and Édouard Carpentier	1	May 25, 1957	(Note: The exact date Gagne and Carpentier lost the championship is unknown, which means their reign lasted between 7 and 34 days.)	Milwaukee, Wisconsin	live event		
15	Nicolai and Boris Volkoff	3	June 1957	(Note: The exact date the Volkoffs won the championship is unknown, which means their reign lasted between 1 day and 29 days.)		live event		
16	Reggie and Stan Lisowski	3	June 29, 1957	238	Chicago, Illinois	live event		
17	Nicolai and Boris Volkoff	4	February 22, 1958	266	Chicago, Illinois	live event		
18	Jackie and Don Fargo	1	November 15, 1958	(Note: The exact date the championship was vacated is unknown, which means their reign lasted between 47 and 263 days.)	Chicago, Illinois	live event		
—	Vacated	—	1959	N/A	N/A	N/A	Championship vacated for undocumented reasons	
19	Roy and Ray Shire	1	August 6, 1959	189	Indianapolis, Indiana	live event	defeated Angelo Poffo and Dick Afflis in a tournament final	
20	Gene Kiniski and Dick Afflis	1	February 11, 1960	58		live event		
21	Roy and Ray Shire	2	April 9, 1960	(Note: The exact date the championship was abandoned is unknown, which means their reign lasted between 114 and 144 days.)		live event		
—	Retired	—	August 1960	N/A	N/A	N/A	Championship retired when promoter Fred Kohler left the NWA to help for the American Wrestling Association, replacing the championship with the AWA World Tag Team Championship	

== Team reigns by combined length ==
Key

Symbol	Meaning
¤	The exact length of at least one title reign is uncertain, so the shortest possible length is used.

Rank	Team	No. of reigns	Combined days
1	Nicolai and Boris Volkoff	4	435¤
2	Reggie Lisowski and Art Neilson	1	371
3	Roy and Ray Shire	2	333¤
4	Pat O'Connor and Roy McClarity	1	319¤
5	Reggie and Stan Lisowski	3	117¤
6	Bill Melby and Billy Darnell	2	85¤
7	Gene Kiniski and Dick Afflis	1	58
8	Jackie and Don Fargo	1	47¤
9	Mike DiBiase and Danny Plechas	1	12¤
10	Verne Gagne and Édouard Carpentier	1	7¤
11	Ben and Mike Sharpe	1	1¤
11	Bobby Bruns and Roy McClarity	1	1¤
11	Guy Brunetti and Joe Tangara	1	1¤
11	Lord James Blears and Lord Athol Layton	1	1¤

== Individual reigns by combined length ==
Key

Symbol	Meaning
¤	The exact length of at least one title reign is uncertain, so the shortest possible length is used.

Rank	Wrestler	No. of reigns	Combined days
1	Reggie Lisowski	4	488¤
2	Boris Volkoff	4	435¤
2	Nicolai Volkoff	4	435¤
4	Art Neilson	1	371¤
5	Ray Shire	2	333¤
5	Roy Shire	2	333¤
7	Pat O'Connor	1	319¤
7	Roy McClarity	1	319¤
9	Stan Lisowski	3	117¤
10	Bill Melby	2	85¤
10	Billy Darnell	2	85¤
12	Dick Afflis	1	58
12	Gene Kiniski	1	58
14	Don Fargo	1	47¤
14	Jackie Fargo	1	47¤
16	Danny Plechas	1	12¤
16	Mike DiBiase	1	12¤
18	Édouard Carpentier	1	7¤
18	Verne Gagne	1	7¤
20	Ben Sharpe	1	1¤
20	Bobby Bruns	1	1¤
20	Guy Brunetti	1	1¤
20	Joe Tangara	1	1¤
20	Lord Athol Layton	1	1¤
20	Lord James Blears	1	1¤
20	Mike Sharpe	1	1¤
20	Roy McClarity	1	1¤

== See also ==
- National Wrestling Alliance
- NWA World Tag Team Championship

== Concurrent championships ==
Sources for 13 simultaneous NWA World Tag Team Championships

- NWA World Tag Team Championship (Los Angeles version)
- NWA World Tag Team Championship (San Francisco version)
- NWA World Tag Team Championship (Central States version)
- NWA World Tag Team Championship (Chicago version)
- NWA World Tag Team Championship (Buffalo Athletic Club version)
- NWA World Tag Team Championship (Georgia version)
- NWA World Tag Team Championship (Iowa/Nebraska version)
- NWA World Tag Team Championship (Indianapolis version)
- NWA World Tag Team Championship (Salt Lake Wrestling Club version)
- NWA World Tag Team Championship (Amarillo version)
- NWA World Tag Team Championship (Minneapolis version)
- NWA World Tag Team Championship (Texas version)
- NWA World Tag Team Championship (Mid-America version)
