= Guillotine Gordon =

American wrestler (born 1935)

Personal information
- Born: Charles Weir; January 14, 1935 (age 91) Detroit, Michigan, U.S.

Professional wrestling career
- Ring name(s): Guillotine Gordon; Buster Gordon; Enforcer Luciano; The Enforcer; Jimmy Valentine; Big Boy Blondell; Bob Blondell; Charlie Weir; Evil Eye Gordon; Evil Eye Valentine; Jimmy Weir; John Blondell; PJ Higgins; Sonny Love
- Billed height: 6 ft 5 in (1.96 m)
- Billed weight: 308 lb (140 kg)
- Debut: early 1960s
- Retired: 1985

Charles Weir (born January 14, 1935) is a retired American professional wrestler known for working in the World Wide Wrestling Federation from 1964 to 1969 as Guillotine Gordon, and the National Wrestling Alliance as Enforcer Luciano.

== Professional wrestling career ==
Weir began his career in the 1960s. He made his debut for the World Wide Wrestling Federation in 1964. Also during that decade, he worked in Dallas, Houston, Georgia, Kansas City and Florida. In 1967, he returned to the World Wide Wrestling Federation where he had matches against Bruno Sammartino, Edouard Carpentier, Gorilla Monsoon, Tony Parisi, and Earl Maynard. He left the WWWF in 1969.

In the 1970s, he continued to work for Georgia and the Mid-Atlantic territories.

In 1980, he won the NWA Americas Tag Team Championship and the NWA Los Angeles Tag Team Championship both with Ox Baker as Enforcer Luciano in Los Angeles.

Then in 1981, he worked in Japan as The Enforcer for International Wrestling Enterprise and New Japan Pro Wrestling.

He retired from wrestling in 1985 in the American Wrestling Association.

== Championships and accomplishments ==
- NWA Hollywood Wrestling
  - NWA Americas Tag Team Championship (1 time) – with Ox Baker
  - NWA World Tag Team Championship (Los Angeles version) (2 times) – with Ox Baker (1) and Víctor Rivera
