= NWA World Tag Team Championship (Los Angeles version) =

Professional wrestling tag team championship

- The Los Angeles version of the championship

Details
- Promotion: North American Wrestling Alliance; NWA Hollywood Wrestling
- Date established: No later than July 14, 1949; 1979
- Date retired: 1958/1959; December 26, 1982
Statistics
- First champions: The Dusek Family (Emil and Ernie Dusek; 1949); The Twin Devils (Twin Devil #1 and #2; 1979)

The Los Angeles version of the NWA World Tag Team Championship was the main tag team professional wrestling championship of the North American Wrestling Alliance, a member of the National Wrestling Alliance (NWA), which promoted shows in and around Los Angeles. The championship was the first of at least 17 championships to use that name between 1949 and 1992, as the NWA Board of Directors allowed each territory to create its own version of the NWA World Tag Team Championship if it so desired. In 1957 there were at least 13 different versions of the NWA World Tag Team Championship recognized in the United States.^{[Championships]} Since it was a professional wrestling championship, it was not won through legitimate competitive matches, but instead determined by the decisions of the booker(s) of a wrestling promotion.

The first version of the Los Angeles NWA World Tag Team Championship was created in 1949, less than a year after the NWA itself was founded. At the time, tag team wrestling was popular on the West Coast, leading to the local NWA promoters Hugh Nichols and Johnny Doyle creating the first-ever NWA World Tag Team Championship when they announced The Dusek Family (Ernie and Emil Dusek) as the first champions on July 14, 1949. The NWA Board of Directors dictated that all NWA territories recognize only one NWA World Heavyweight Champion, but allowed each territory to crown its own world tag team champion, making each championship a regional championship despite the name. The Los Angeles territory promoted its NWA World Tag Team Championship for eleven years, with Ben and Mike Sharpe being the last champions of the era. The Duseks were the only team to hold the championship twice in that period of time. The longest reign of the first era belonged to Guy Brunetti and Joe Tangero, who held the championship for at least 277 days. After the Los Angeles version was abandoned, the local promoters recognized the San Francisco version in subsequent years.

By the 1970s the San Francisco territory had been taken over by Mike and Gene Lebell's NWA Hollywood Wrestling. In June 1970 the Twin Devils (two masked wrestlers identified only as Twin Devil #1 and Twin Devil #2) were billed as the NWA World Tag Team Champions. Records are not clear on how the Twin Devils became champions; since no records of a tournament have been found, it is possible they were simply awarded the championship when the Lebells decided to reintroduce the NWA World Tag Team Championship. Los Brazos (Spanish for "The Arms"; Brazo de Plata and Brazo de Oro) were the last holders of the championship as NWA Hollywood Wrestling closed in December 1982. From that point on, the NWA Mid-Atlantic version was the only active NWA Word Tag Team Championship left.

== Title history ==
Key

No.	The overall championship reign
Reign	The reign number for the specific wrestler listed.
Event	The event promoted by the respective promotion in which the title changed hands
N/A	The specific information is not known
—	Used for vacated reigns in order to not count it as an official reign
	Indicates that there was a period where the lineage is undocumented due to the lack of written documentation in that time period.

No.	Champions	Reign	Date	Days held	Location	Event	Notes	Ref(s)
1	The Dusek Family (Emil Dusek and Ernie Dusek)	1	July 14, 1949 (NLT)	(Note: The length of the championship reign is too uncertain to calculate.)	Long Beach, California	Live event	The Duseks held "a" world tag team championship in Phoenix, Arizona as early as May 22, 1949. The duo was recognized as champions in California on this date	
2	George and Bobby Becker	1	August 14, 1950 (NLT)		(Note: The location of the championship change has not been captured as part of the documentation.)	Live event	Still billed as champions on November 20, 1950	
3	Gino and Leo Garibaldi	1	03 (NLT)			Live event		
4	The Dusek Family (Emil Dusek and Ernie Dusek)	2	August 13, 1951 (NLT)			Live event		
5	Great Togo and Tosh Togo	1	June 4, 1955 (NLT)			Live event	Danny McShain and Great Scott were billed as champions during this time period.Wrestle to a draw against the Togo Brothers on August 6, 1955/08/06 The Togo brothers are still champions on September 18, 1955	
6	Guy Brunetti and Joe Tangero	1	August 24, 1957 (NLT)	(Note: The exact date the championship was won and lost is unknown, which means that the championship lasted between 1 day and 277 days)		Live event	Still billed as champions on September 4, 1957	
7	Hans Herman and Hans Schmidt	1	October 1957		Los Angeles, California	Live event		
8	Berry and Tosh Togo (2)	1	1958		Los Angeles, California	Live event		
9	Billy Darnell and Sándor Szabó	1	September 1958		Live event	Los Angeles, California		
—	Abandoned	N/A	1958 or 1959	N/A	N/A	N/A	Championship was abandoned	
10	The Twin Devils (Twin Devil 1 and Twin Devil 2)	1	1979		Los Angeles, California	Live event	The Twins Devils were awarded the championship when the promotion brought the championship back.	
11	Dory Funk, Jr. and Terry Funk	1	February 1980		Los Angeles, California	Live event		
12	The Hood and Ron Starr	1	1980		Los Angeles, California	Live event		
13	Walter Johnson and Alberto Madril	1	1980		Los Angeles, California	Live event		
14	Ox Baker and Enforcer Lusciano	1	1980		Los Angeles, California	Live event		
15	Walter and Battleship Johnson	1	1980		Los Angeles, California	Live event		
16	Enforcer Lusciano and Victor Rivera	1	1980		Los Angeles, California	Live event		
17	The Twin Devils (Twin Devil 1 and Twin Devil 2)	2	1981		Los Angeles, California	Live event		
18	Rick and John Davidson	1	April 2, 1981 (NLT)		Los Angeles, California	Live event	Still billed as champions on August 22, 1981	
19	Carlos Mata and Kiss	1	1982		Los Angeles, California	Live event		
—	Vacated	—	1982	N/A	N/A	N/A	Championship vacated for undocumented reasons	
20	Tor Kamata and Kamalamala	1	February 13, 1982	(Note: The exact date where Kamata and Kamalamala lost the championship is unknown, which means that the championship reign latsted between 77 and 107 days.)	Bakersfield, California	Live event	Defeated Alex Perez and Ron Starr to win the championship	
21	Los Brazos (Brazo de Oro and Brazo de Plata)	1	May 1982	(Note: The exact date where Los Brazos won the championship is unknown, which means that the championship reign latsted between 209 and 239 days.)	Los Angeles, California	Live event		
—	Championship retired	—	December 26, 1982	N/A	N/A	N/A	Promotion closes and the championship is abandoned	

== Team reigns by combined length ==
Key

Symbol	Meaning
¤	The exact length of at least one title reign is uncertain, so the shortest possible length is used.

Rank	Team	No. of reigns	Combined days
1	Los Brazos (Brazo de Oro and Brazo de Plata)	1	209¤
2	Tor Kamata and Kamalamala	1	77¤
3	Ox Baker and Enforcer Lusciano	1	¤
3	George and Bobby Becker	1	¤
3	Billy Darnell and Sándor Szabó	1	¤
3	The Dusek Family (Emil Dusek and Ernie Dusek)	2	¤
3	Dory Funk Jr. and Terry Funk	1	¤
3	Gino and Leo Garibaldi	1	¤
3	Great Togo and Tosh Togo	1	¤
3	Hans Herman and Hans Schmidt	1	¤
3	The Hood and Ron Starr	1	¤
3	Walter and Battleship Johnson	1	¤
3	Walter Johnson and Alberto Madril	1	¤
3	Enforcer Lusciano and Victor Rivera	1	¤
3	Carlos Mata and Kiss	1	¤
3	Berry and Tosh Togo	1	¤
3	The Twin Devils (Twin Devil 1 and Twin Devil 2)	2	¤
3	Rick and John Davidson	1	¤

== Individual reigns by combined length ==
Key

Symbol	Meaning
¤	The exact length of at least one title reign is uncertain, so the shortest possible length is used.

Rank	Wrestler	No. of reigns	Combined days
1	Brazo de Oro	1	209¤
1	Brazo de Plata	1	209¤
3	Tor Kamata	1	77¤
3	Kamalamala	1	77¤
5	Ox Baker	1	¤
5	Bobby Becker	1	¤
5	George Becker	1	¤
5	Billy Darnell	1	¤
5	Emil Dusek	2	¤
5	Ernie Dusek	2	¤
5	Terry Funk	1	¤
5	Dory Funk Jr.	1	¤
5	Gino Garibaldi	1	¤
5	Leo Garibaldi	1	¤
5	Great Togo	1	¤
5	Hans Herman	1	¤
5	The Hood	1	¤
5	Battleship Johnson	1	¤
5	Walter Johnson	2	¤
5	Kiss	1	¤
5	Enforcer Lusciano	2	¤
5	Alberto Madril	1	¤
5	Carlos Mata	1	¤
5	Victor Rivera	1	¤
5	Hans Schmidt	1	¤
5	Ron Starr	1	¤
5	Sándor Szabó	1	¤
5	Berry Togo	1	¤
5	Tosh Togo	1	¤
5	Tosh Togo	1	¤
5	Twin Devil 1	2	¤
5	Twin Devil 2	2	¤
5	John Davidson	1	¤
5	Rick Davidson	1	¤

== See also ==
- National Wrestling Alliance
- NWA World Tag Team Championship

== Concurrent championships ==
Sources for 13 simultaneous NWA World Tag Team Championships

- NWA World Tag Team Championship (Los Angeles version)
- NWA World Tag Team Championship (San Francisco version)
- NWA World Tag Team Championship (Central States version)
- NWA World Tag Team Championship (Chicago version)
- NWA World Tag Team Championship (Buffalo Athletic Club version)
- NWA World Tag Team Championship (Georgia version)
- NWA World Tag Team Championship (Iowa/Nebraska version)
- NWA World Tag Team Championship (Indianapolis version)
- NWA World Tag Team Championship (Salt Lake Wrestling Club version)
- NWA World Tag Team Championship (Amarillo version)
- NWA World Tag Team Championship (Minneapolis version)
- NWA World Tag Team Championship (Texas version)
- NWA World Tag Team Championship (Mid-America version)
