= NWA Hawaii Tag Team Championship =

Professional wrestling tag team championship

Details
- Promotion: 50th State Big Time Wrestling
- Date established: June 8, 1952
- Date retired: March 31, 2007
Statistics
- First champions: Lucky Simunovich and Bobby Bruns
- Final champions: 939 Connection (Ricky Thunder and Jody Lopez)
- Most reigns: Lord James Blears and Neff Maiava (4 reigns)

The NWA Hawaii Tag Team Championship was the primary tag team title of 50th State Big Time Wrestling and was defended between 1952 and 1979 when it was phased out. The title was later revived by the current incarnation of NWA Hawaii in 2000. It is the earliest regional tag team title in to be defended in the Pacific coast of the United States, along with the NWA Pacific Northwest Tag Team Championship, and was originally defended in Honolulu, Hawaii. As of 2007, it is defended in Kalihi, Kaneohe and Wahiawa, Hawaii.

== Title history ==
Key
No.	Overall reign number
Reign	Reign number for the specific champion
Days	Number of days held

No.	Champion	Championship change			Reign statistics		Notes	Ref.
No.	Champion	Date	Event	Location	Reign	Days	Notes	Ref.
1	Lucky Simunovich and Bobby Bruns	June 8, 1952	BTW show	Honolulu, Hawaii	1	154	First champions; vacant in October 1952 for not defending title.	
2	Lucky Simunovich (2) and Gino Garibaldi	November 9, 1952	BTW show	Honolulu, Hawaii	1	N/A	Defeated Bob Langevin and Tom Rice for the title.	
3	Lucky Simunovich (3) and Bobby Bruns	December 1952	BTW show	N/A	2	N/A		
4	Bobby Bruns (3) and Rikidōzan	February 1953	BTW show	N/A	1	N/A		
5	Tom Rice and Al Kashey	March 1, 1953	BTW show	Honolulu, Hawaii	1	35		
6	Bobby Bruns (4) and Bobby Managoff	April 5, 1953	BTW show	Honolulu, Hawaii	1	175		
7	Bud Curtis and Tommy O'Toole	September 27, 1953	BTW show	Honolulu, Hawaii	1	105	Defeated Bruns and Jack Witzig; vacant in December 1953.	
8	Bobby Bruns (5) and Luther Lindsey	January 10, 1954	BTW show	Honolulu, Hawaii	1	N/A		
Championship history is unrecorded from January 10, 1954 to August 1954.
9	Bobby Bruns (6) and John Paul Henning	August 1954	BTW show	N/A	1	N/A		
10	Lou Newman and Hans Schnabel	October 10, 1954	BTW show	Honolulu, Hawaii	1	49		
11	Roger Mackay and Don Beitleman	November 28, 1954	BTW show	Honolulu, Hawaii	1	84		
12	Bobby Bruns (7) and Lucky Simunovich (4)	February 20, 1955	BTW show	Honolulu, Hawaii	2	56		
13	Rikidōzan (2) and Azumafuji	April 17, 1955	BTW show	Honolulu, Hawaii	1	N/A		
		May 8, 1955	N/A	N/A			Rikidōzan is suspended for unmasking the Zebra Kid.	
14	Johnny Barend and Sandor Kovacs	September 1955	BTW show	N/A	1	N/A		
15	Lord James Blears and Gene Kiniski	December 4, 1955	BTW show	Honolulu, Hawaii	1	147		
16	Great Togo and Tosh Togo	April 29, 1956	BTW show	Honolulu, Hawaii	1	98		
17	Billy Varga and Sam Steamboat	August 5, 1956	BTW show	Honolulu, Hawaii	1	266	Defeated Tosh Togo and Ed Gardenia.	
Championship history is unrecorded from 1957 to April 28, 1957.
18	Lord Athol Layton and Tom Rice (2)	April 28, 1957	BTW show	Honolulu, Hawaii	1	553	Defeat Al Lolotai and Lucky Simunovich.	
Championship history is unrecorded from April 28, 1957 to November 2, 1958.
19	Lord James Blears (2) and Joe Blanchard	November 2, 1958	BTW show	Honolulu, Hawaii	1	N/A	Defeated Murder Incorporated (Stan Kowalski and Tiny Mills).	
20	Murder Incorporated (Stan Kowalski and Tiny Mills)	January 1959	BTW show	N/A	1	N/A		
21	Rikidōzan (3) and Koukichi Endoh	January 10, 1959	BTW show	Utsunomiya, Japan	1	95		
22	Lord James Blears (3) and Joe Blanchard	April 15, 1959	BTW show	Honolulu, Hawaii	2	N/A		
23	Lord James Blears (4) and Jerry Gordet	December 1959	BTW show	N/A	1	N/A		
24	Hard Boiled Haggerty and Bill Savage	January 27, 1960	BTW show	Honolulu, Hawaii	1	42		
25	Lord James Blears (5) and Herb Freeman	March 9, 1960	BTW show	Honolulu, Hawaii	1	35		
26	Hard Boiled Haggerty (2) and Butcher Vachon	April 13, 1960	BTW show	Honolulu, Hawaii	1	28		
27	Nick Kozak and Jerry Gordet (2)	May 11, 1960	BTW show	Honolulu, Hawaii	1	98		
28	Shoulders Newman and Hans Schnabel (2)	August 17, 1960	BTW show	Honolulu, Hawaii	1	42		
29	Utica Panther and Bill Wright	September 28, 1960	BTW show	Honolulu, Hawaii	1	35		
30	Shoulders Newman (2) and Tim Rice (3)	November 2, 1960	BTW show	Honolulu, Hawaii	1	238		
31	Neff Maiava and Billy White Wolf	June 28, 1961	BTW show	Honolulu, Hawaii	1	N/A	Defeated Shoulders Newman and Ted Travis when Rice leaves the area.	
32	Shoulders Newman (3) and Ted Travis	July 19, 1961	BTW show	Honolulu, Hawaii	1	113		
33	Lord James Blears (6) and Neff Maiava (2)	November 9, 1961	BTW show	Honolulu, Hawaii	1	0		
34	Shoulders Newman (3) and Ted Travis	November 9, 1961	BTW show	Honolulu, Hawaii	2	13		
35	Lord James Blears (7) and Neff Maiava (3)	November 22, 1961	BTW show	Honolulu, Hawaii	2	659		
36	Curtis Iaukea and Tosh Togo (2)	September 12, 1963	BTW show	Honolulu, Hawaii	1	−209		
37	Lord James Blears (8) and Neff Maiava (4)	February 15, 1963	BTW show	Honolulu, Hawaii	3	167		
38	Curtis Iaukea (2) and Cowboy Cassidy	August 1, 1963	BTW show	Honolulu, Hawaii	1	286		
39	Robert Duranton and Shag Thomas	May 13, 1964	BTW show	Honolulu, Hawaii	1	65		
40	Mr. Moto and Nikita Mulkovich	July 17, 1964	BTW show	Honolulu, Hawaii	1	12		
41	Lord James Blears (9) and Neff Maiava (5)	July 29, 1964	BTW show	Honolulu, Hawaii	3	162		
42	Curtis Iaukea (3) and Mr. Fujiwara	January 7, 1965	BTW show	Honolulu, Hawaii	1	141		
43	Alberto and Enrique Torres	May 28, 1965	BTW show	Honolulu, Hawaii	1	61		
44	Luther Lindsay and Bearcat Wright	July 28, 1965	BTW show	Honolulu, Hawaii	1	160		
45	Ripper Collins and Johnny Barend (2)	January 4, 1966	BTW show	Honolulu, Hawaii	1	302		
46	Neff Maiava (6) and Pampero Firpo	November 2, 1966	BTW show	Honolulu, Hawaii	1	91		
47	Johnny Barend (3) and Hans Mortier	February 1, 1967	BTW show	Honolulu, Hawaii	1	91		
48	Curtis Iaukea (4) and Ripper Collins (2)	May 3, 1967	BTW show	Honolulu, Hawaii	1	83		
49	Johnny Barend (4) and Jim Hady	July 25, 1967	BTW show	Honolulu, Hawaii	1	155		
50	Ripper Collins (3) and Johnny Barend (5)	December 27, 1967	BTW show	Honolulu, Hawaii	2	56	Barend and Collins split up; According to Hawaii Wrestling Review, the title is vacant during this time.	
51	Jim Hady (2) and Missing Link	February 21, 1968	BTW show	Honolulu, Hawaii	1	23		
52	Curtis Iaukea (5) and Ripper Collins (4)	March 15, 1968	BTW show	Honolulu, Hawaii	2	68		
53	Jim Hady (3) and Peter Maivia	May 22, 1968	BTW show	Honolulu, Hawaii	1	13		
54	Curtis Iaukea (6) and Ripper Collins (5)	June 4, 1968	BTW show	Honolulu, Hawaii	3	22		
55	Peter Maivia (2) and Billy White Wolf (2)	June 26, 1968	BTW show	Honolulu, Hawaii	1	21		
56	Johnny Barend (6) and Magnificent Maurice	July 17, 1968	BTW show	Honolulu, Hawaii	1	91		
57	Jim Hady (4) and Billy White Wolf (3)	October 16, 1968	BTW show	Honolulu, Hawaii	1	21		
58	Ripper Collins (6) and "Crazy" Luke Graham	November 6, 1968	BTW show	Honolulu, Hawaii	1	126		
59	Nick Bockwinkel and Bobby Shane	March 12, 1969	BTW show	Honolulu, Hawaii	1	35		
60	Ripper Collins (7) and Buddy Austin	April 16, 1969	BTW show	Honolulu, Hawaii	1	119		
61	Pedro Morales and Ed Francis	August 13, 1969	BTW show	Honolulu, Hawaii	1	28		
62	Kurt Von Steiger and Karl Von Steiger	September 10, 1969	BTW show	Honolulu, Hawaii	1	21		
63	Pedro Morales and Ed Francis	October 1, 1969	BTW show	Honolulu, Hawaii	2	N/A		
64	The Von Steigers (Kurt Von Steiger and Karl Von Steiger)	October 1969	BTW show	N/A	1	N/A		
65	Curtis Iaukea (7) and Ripper Collins (8)	October 22, 1969	BTW show	Honolulu, Hawaii	4	N/A		
66	Ripper Collins (9) and Johnny Barend (7)	N//A	BTW show	N/A	3	N/A		
67	Pedro Morales (3) and Bing Ki Lee	March 4, 1970	BTW show	Honolulu, Hawaii	1	119		
68	Billy Robinson and Johnny Barend (8)	July 1, 1970	BTW show	Honolulu, Hawaii	1	119		
69	Billy Robinson and Ed Francis	October 28, 1970	BTW show	Honolulu, Hawaii	1	76		
70	Ripper Collins (10) and Mad Dog Mayne	January 12, 1971	BTW show	Honolulu, Hawaii	1	155		
71	Suni War Cloud and Steven Little Bear	June 16, 1971	BTW show	Honolulu, Hawaii	1	10		
72	Ripper Collins (11) and Mad Dog Mayne	June 26, 1971	BTW show	Honolulu, Hawaii	2	25		
73	Sam Steamboat (2) and Bearcat Wright (2)	July 21, 1971	BTW show	Honolulu, Hawaii	1	80		
74	Sweet Daddy Siki and Mad Dog Mayne	October 9, 1971	BTW show	Honolulu, Hawaii	1	N/A		
Championship history is unrecorded from October 9, 1971 to 1973.
75	Sam Steamboat (3) and Peter Maivia (3)	N//A	BTW show	N/A	1	N/A		
76	Ripper Collins (12) and Ed Francis	July 25, 1973	BTW show	Honolulu, Hawaii	1	63		
77	Sam Steamboat (4) and Peter Maivia (4)	September 26, 1973	BTW show	Honolulu, Hawaii	2	63		
78	Ripper Collins (13) and Johnny Valentine	November 28, 1973	BTW show	Honolulu, Hawaii	1	N/A		
Championship history is unrecorded from November 28, 1973 to 1977.
79	Sam Steamboat (5) and Billy White Wolf (4)	July 1977	BTW show	N/A	1	N/A	Defeat Steve Strong and Steve Lawler.	
80	Steve Strong and Jesse Ventura	July 28, 1977	BTW show	Honolulu, Hawaii	1	N/A		
81	John Tolos and Bill Francis	November 1977	BTW show	N/A	1	N/A		
82	Steve Strong and Chris Markoff	January 1978	BTW show	N/A	1	N/A		
83	Russ and Bill Francis	April 26, 1978	BTW show	Honolulu, Hawaii	1	21		
84	"Big" John Studd and "Playboy" Buddy Rose	May 17, 1978	BTW show	Honolulu, Hawaii	1	28		
85	Steve Strong and John Tolos (2)	June 14, 1978	BTW show	Honolulu, Hawaii	1	63		
86	Mr. Fuji (2) and Karl Von Steiger (3)	August 16, 1978	BTW show	Honolulu, Hawaii	1	112		
87	Mando Guerrero and Samoa	December 6, 1978	BTW show	Honolulu, Hawaii	1	N/A		
88	Ripper Collins (14) and Whipper Billy Watson	N//A	BTW show	N/A		N/A		
89	Tama Samoa and Ati-Tago	N//A	BTW show	N/A		N/A		
—	Deactivated	N//A	—	—	—	—		
NWA Hawaii
90	Akua and Kaimana	October 27, 2000	NWA Hawaii show	Kalihi, Hawaii	1	141	First champions upon being awarded the reinstated title.	
91	Team Titan	March 17, 2001	NWA Hawaii show	Kaneohe, Hawaii	1	77		
92	East Coast Connection (Joe Wolfen and Sick Dog)	June 2, 2001	NWA Hawaii show	Kaneohe, Hawaii	1	126		
93	Men of Steele; KC Adams and Mike Taylor	October 6, 2001	NWA Hawaii show	Kaneohe, Hawaii		120		
94	Tiki and Bruiser	February 3, 2002	NWA Hawaii show	Honolulu, Hawaii	1	62		
95	East Coast Connection (Joe Wolfen and Sick Dog)	April 6, 2002	NWA Hawaii show	Kaneohe, Hawaii	2	168		
96	Tiki and Bruiser	September 21, 2002	NWA Hawaii show	Waikiki, Hawaii	2	1		
97	East Coast Connection (Joe Wolfen and Sick Dog)	September 22, 2002	NWA Hawaii show	Waikiki, Hawaii	3	251	Stripped on May 22, 2003 when the team splits up.	
98	The Hawaiian Power Company (Tiki and Kapu)	May 31, 2003	NWA Hawaii show	Honolulu, Hawaii	1	170	Defeated the Iraqi Regime (Al-Ahmed Mohammed and Dumas Shiite) for the titles.	
99	Iraqi Regime (Al-Ahmed Mohammed and Dumas Shiite)	November 17, 2003	NWA Hawaii show	Honolulu, Hawaii		397		
100	808 Reckin Kru (Big Daddy Frank and Biggie Mack)	December 18, 2004	NWA Hawaii show	Kaneohe, Hawaii	1	126		
101	J.T. Wolfen and Kaimana	April 23, 2005	NWA Hawaii show	Honolulu, Hawaii	1	14		
102	Kris Kavanaugh and Cholo	May 7, 2005	NWA Hawaii show	Pearl Harbor, Hawaii	1	91	Defeated Hawaiian Blood (Kaimana and Kaniala), substituting for Wolfen.	
103	J.T. Wolfen and Kaimana	August 6, 2005	NWA Hawaii show	Wahiawa, Hawaii	2	104		
104	The Nightmarchers (Ahuna and Kaniala)	November 18, 2005	NWA Hawaii show	Honolulu, Hawaii	1	253	Defeated Wolfen and J Lo, substituting for Kaimana. They also held HCW Kekaulike Heritage Title which was officially unified with the NWA Hawaii titles on May 19, 2006. Titles are later vacated on July 8, 2006.	
105	939 Connection (Ricky Thunder and Jody Lopez)	July 29, 2006	NWA Hawaii show	Wahiawa, Hawaii	1	N/A	Defeated Hawaiian Blood (Kaimana and Kaniala) in 6-team one-night tournament final	
—		March 31, 2007	—	—			Thunder was injured	
