= NWA World Tag Team Championship (Salt Lake Wrestling Club version) =

Professional wrestling tag team championship

Details
- Promotion: Salt Lake Wrestling Club; Northwest Tri-State Wrestling
- Date established: No later than December 29, 1955
- Date retired: 1959
Statistics
- First champions: Guy Brunett and Joe Tangaro
- Most reigns: Guy Brunetti/Joe Tagaro and Frank Jares/Great Sasaki (3 reigns); Individual: The Bat (4 reigns)

The Salt Lake Wrestling Club version of the NWA World Tag Team Championship was a professional wrestling championship for tag teams that was promoted between 1955 and 1959 in the Salt Lake Wrestling Club territory of the National Wrestling Alliance (NWA). Local promoter Dave Reynolds promoted the championship primarily in Utah, but would occasionally runs shows in Idaho and Washington state. Since the promotion was a member of the NWA, the Salt Lake Wrestling Club was entitled to promote their local version of the championship, as the NWA bylaws did not restrict the use of that championship in the same way they restricted the NWA World Heavyweight Championship to one nationally recognized championship. In 1957 there were no less than 13 distinct versions of the NWA World Tag Team Championship promoted across the United States.^{[Championships]} Because the championship was a professional wrestling championship, it was not contested for in legitimate sporting events, but instead determined by the decision of the bookers of a wrestling promotion.

The team of Guy Brunetti and Joe Tangaro were the first recognized champions in the Utah/Idaho region, being introduced as champions no later than December 29, 1955. Records are unclear as to how they won the championship. The championship was active until 1959 with at least 28 different championship reigns. In 1959 the team of Chico Garcia and Chet Wallick became the final champions, as the championship was abandoned when the Salt Lake Wrestling Club was going out of business. Brunetti and Tangaro ended up holding the championship three times, tied with Frank Jares and Great Sasaki for most championships as a team. The Bat held the championship four times, with four different partners, more than any other wrestler. Brunetti and Tangaro's third championship reign lasted at least 95 days, the longest of any reign. Brunetti and Tangaro's three reigns combined to be at least 237 days long. Due to lack of dates for some championship changes it is impossible to determine who held the championship for the shortest period of time; Bill Melby and Blue Avenger's 14 day reign from November 21 to December 10, 1956, is the shortest confirmed reign, but the possibility exists that a shorter reign actually happened.

== Title history ==
Key

Symbol	Meaning
No.	The overall championship reign
Reign	The reign number for the specific wrestler listed.
Event	The event in which the championship changed hands
N/A	The specific information is not known
—	Used for vacated reigns in order to not count it as an official reign
[Note #]	Indicates that the exact length of the title reign is unknown, with a note providing more details.
	Indicates that there was a period where the lineage is undocumented due to the lack of written documentation in that time period.
(nlt)	Indicates that a title change took place "no later than" the date listed. (Note: Documentation of the specific date of a title change is not found but documentation of the champion holding the title on that date/in that period.)

No.	Champions	Reign	Date	Days held	Location	Event	Notes	Ref(s)
1	Guy Brunetti and Joe Tangaro	1	December 29, 1955 (NLT)	(Note: The exact date that Brunetti and Tangaro won the championship is uncertain which means that the reign lasted at least 135 days.)	(Note: The location of the match was not captured as part of the documentation.)	Live event	Records are unclear on how Brunetti and Tangaro became champions	
2	Yvon Quimet and Roy Shire	1	May 12, 1956	(Note: The exact date that Quimet and Shire lost the championship is uncertain which means that the reign lasted between 1 day and 146 days.)	Ogden, Utah	Live event	Still listed as champions on July 9, 1956	
3	Kit Fox and Roger McKay	1	October 5, 1956 (NLT)	(Note: The exact date that Fox and McKay won and lost the championship is uncertain which means that the reign lasted between 1 day and 210 days.)		Live event	Still listed as champions on November 5, 1956	
4	Yvon Quimet and Roy Shire	2	December 1956 (NLT)	(Note: The exact date that Quimet and Shire won the championship is uncertain which means that the reign lasted between 9 days and 60 days.)	Spokane, Washington	Live event		
5	Frank Jares and Great Sasaki	1	December 10, 1956	11	Idaho Falls, Idaho	Live event		
6	Guy Brunetti and Joe Tangaro	2	December 21, 1956	7	Salt Lake City, Utah	Live event		
7	Frank Jares and Great Sasaki	2	December 28, 1956	1	Salt Lake City, Utah	Live event		
8	Guy Brunetti and Joe Tangaro	3	December 29, 1956	(Note: The exact date that Brunetti and Tangaro lost the championship is uncertain which means that the reign lasted between 95 days and 124 days.)	Ogden, Utah	Live event		
8	Frank Jares and Great Sasaki	3	January 6, 1957 (NLT)	(Note: The exact date that Jares and Great Sasaki won and lost the championship is uncertain which means that the reign lasted between 1 day and 8 days.)		Live event		
—	Vacated	—	January 7, 1957 (NLT)	N/A	N/A	N/A	Championship vacated when the Great Sasaki returns to Japan	
9	Vern Taft and Cliff Thiede	1	January 7, 1957	(Note: The exact date that Taft and Thiede lost the championship is uncertain which means that the reign lasted between 1 day and 83 days.)	Idaho Falls, Idaho	Live event	Defeated Frank Jares and Yvon Quimet in the finals of a tournament to win the vacant championship. Still listed as champions on February 15, 1957	
10	Johnny and Jesse James	1	March 1957 (NLT)	(Note: The exact date that The James brothers won the championship is uncertain which means that the reign lasted between 1 day and 71 days.)		Live event		
11	Tosh Togo and Great Sasaki	1	March 20, 1957	7	Ogden, Utah	Live event		
12	Johnny and Jesse James	2	March 27, 1957	(Note: The exact date that the James brothers lost the championship is uncertain which means that the reign lasted between 1 day and 29 days.)	Ogden, Utah	Live event		
13	Tosh Togo and Great Sasaki	2	April 25, 1957 (NLT)	(Note: The exact date that Togo and Great Sasaki won the championship is uncertain which means that the reign lasted between 25 days and 53 days.)		Live event		
14	Henry Lenz and Stretch Parks	1	May 20, 1957	46	Idaho Falls, Idaho	Live event		
15	Rocky Monroe and The Bat	1	July 5, 1957	(Note: The exact date that Monroe and the Bat won the championship is uncertain which means that the reign lasted between 1 day and 137 days.)	Salt Lake City, Utah	Live event	Still listed as champions on August 26, 1957	
16	The Bat (2) and Eric the Great	1	November 19, 1957 (NLT)	(Note: The exact date in that The Bat and Eric the Great won and lost the championship is uncertain which means that this reign lasted between 1 day and 165 days.)		Live event		
17	Tony Borne and Rey Urbano	1	February 8, 1958 (NLT)	(Note: The exact date that Borne and Urbano won and lost the championship is uncertain which means that the reign lasted between 1 day and 111 days.)		Live event		
18	Tony Borne and Paul DeGalles	1	March 11, 1958 (NLT)	(Note: The exact date that Borne and DeGalles won the championship is uncertain which means that the reign lasted between 3 days and 33 days.)		Live event		
19	Gino Angelo and Tony Silipini	1	March 14, 1958	91	Salt Lake City, Utah	Live event		
20	Mitsu Arakawa and The Bat (3)	1	June 13, 1958	46	Salt Lake City, Utah	Live event		
21	Lou Newman and Reggie Siki	1	July 29, 1958	48	Twin Falls, Idaho	Live event	Championship change was repeated in Idaho Falls on August 4, 1958	
22	Oni Wiki Wiki and Prince Maiava	1	September 15, 1958	32	Idaho Falls, Idaho	Live event		
23	Lou Newman and Ox Anderson	1	October 17, 1958	35	Salt Lake City, Utah	Live event		
24	Bill Melby and Blue Avenger	1	November 21, 1958	14	Salt Lake City, Utah	Live event		
25	Mighty Milo and Lou Newman	1	December 5, 1958	(Note: The exact date that Mighty Milo and Newman lost the championship is uncertain which means that the reign lasted between 1 day and 132 days.)	Salt Lake City, Utah	Live event		
26	Tony Borne (2) and The Bat (4)	1	April 16, 1959 (NLT)	(Note: The exact date that Borne and the Bat won the championship is uncertain which means that the reign lasted between 5 days and 136 days.)		Live event		
—	Vacated	—	April 21, 1959	N/A	N/A	N/A	Championship held up after a match against Bill Melby and Kit Fox ended inconclusively.	
27	Bill Melby and Kit Fox	1	May 22, 1959 (NLT)	(Note: The exact date that Melby and Fox won the championship is uncertain which means that the reign lasted between 11 days and 41 days.)		Live event	Could have been awarded the championship after The Bat and Tony Borne break up.	
28	Chico Garcia and Chet Wallick	1	June 2, 1959	(Note: The exact date thatGarcia and Wallick lost the championship is uncertain which means that the reign lasted between 1 day and 212 days.)	Twin Falls, Idaho	Live event	The championship match was possibly repeated on June 11 in Idaho Falls. Still listed as champions as of July 1, 1959	
—	Abandoned	—	1959	N/A	N/A	N/A	Championship was no longer defended in the territory.	

== Team reigns by combined length ==
Key

Symbol	Meaning
¤	The exact length of at least one title reign is uncertain, so the shortest possible length is used.

Rank	Team	No. of reigns	Combined days
1	Guy Brunetti and Joe Tangaro	3	237¤
2	Gino Angelo and Tony Silipini	1	91
3	Lou Newman and Reggie Siki	1	48
4	Henry Lenz and Stretch Parks	1	46¤
4	Mitsu Arakawa and The Bat	1	46
6	Lou Newman and Ox Anderson	1	35
7	Oni Wiki Wiki and Prince Maiava	1	32
7	Tosh Togo and Great Sasaki	2	32¤
9	Frank Jares and Great Sasaki	3	14¤
9	Bill Melby and Blue Avenger	1	14
11	Bill Melby and Kit Fox	1	11¤
12	Yvon Quimet and Roy Shire	2	10¤
13	Tony Borne and The Bat	1	5¤
14	Tony Borne and Paul DeGalles	1	3¤
15	Johnny and Jesse James	2	2¤
16	The Bat and Eric the Great	1	1¤
16	Kit Fox and Roger McKay	1	1¤
16	Chico Garcia and Chet Wallick	1	1¤
16	Rocky Monroe and The Bat	1	1¤
16	Vern Taft and Cliff Thiede	1	1¤
16	Tony Borne and Rey Urbano	1	1¤
16	Mighty Milo and Lou Newman	1	1¤

== Individual reigns by combined length ==
Key

Symbol	Meaning
¤	The exact length of at least one title reign is uncertain, so the shortest possible length is used.

Rank	Wrestler	No. of reigns	Combined days
1	Guy Brunetti	3	237¤
1	Joe Tangaro	3	237¤
3	Gino Angelo	1	91
3	Tony Silipini	1	91
5	Lou Newman	2	83
6	The Bat	4	53¤
7	Reggie Siki	1	48
8	Henry Lenz	1	46¤
8	Stretch Parks	1	46¤
8	Mitsu Arakawa	1	46
11	Ox Anderson	1	35
12	Oni Wiki Wiki	1	32
12	Prince Maiava	1	32
12	Tosh Togo	2	32¤
12	Great Sasaki	2	32¤
16	Bill Melby	2	25¤
17	Frank Jares	3	14¤
17	Blue Avenger	1	14
17	Great Sasaki	3	14¤
20	Kit Fox	2	12¤
21	Yvon Quimet	2	10¤
21	Roy Shire	2	10¤
23	Tony Borne	3	9¤
24	Paul DeGalles	1	3¤
25	Jesse James	2	2¤
25	Johnny James	2	2¤
27	Chico Garcia	1	1¤
27	Roger McKay	1	1¤
27	Rocky Monroe	1	1¤
27	Lou Newman	1	1¤
27	Vern Taft	1	1¤
27	Cliff Thiede	1	1¤
27	Rey Urbano	1	1¤
27	Chet Wallick	1	1¤
27	Eric the Great	1	1¤
27	Mighty Milo	1	1¤

== Concurrent championships ==
Sources for 13 simultaneous NWA World Tag Team Championships

- NWA World Tag Team Championship (Los Angeles version)
- NWA World Tag Team Championship (San Francisco version)
- NWA World Tag Team Championship (Central States version)
- NWA World Tag Team Championship (Chicago version)
- NWA World Tag Team Championship (Buffalo Athletic Club version)
- NWA World Tag Team Championship (Georgia version)
- NWA World Tag Team Championship (Iowa/Nebraska version)
- NWA World Tag Team Championship (Indianapolis version)
- NWA World Tag Team Championship (Salt Lake Wrestling Club version)
- NWA World Tag Team Championship (Amarillo version)
- NWA World Tag Team Championship (Minneapolis version)
- NWA World Tag Team Championship (Texas version)
- NWA World Tag Team Championship (Mid-America version)
