= NWA Hawaii Heavyweight Championship =

Professional wrestling championship

Details
- Promotion: 50th State Big Time Wrestling; Island Xtreme Wrestling Federation
- Date established: April 23, 1935
- Date retired: 2010

Other names
- Hawaii Heavyweight Championship; Hawaii Junior Heavyweight Championship
Statistics
- First champion: Wildcat Pete
- Final champion: J.T. Wolfen
- Most reigns: Ripper Collins (8 reigns)
- Longest reign: Al Lolotai (724 days)
- Shortest reign: Nick Bockwinkel (4 days)

The NWA Hawaii Heavyweight Championship was a professional wrestling championship sanctioned by the National Wrestling Alliance and was defended in the US state of Hawaii. The title, which began in 1935. From February 1940 through 1942 the title was known as the Hawaii Junior Heavyweight Championship.

The title was defended in the NWA affiliated promotion, Island Xtreme Wrestling Federation. Previously it was in 50th State Big Time Wrestling and Polynesian Wrestling.

== Title history ==
Key
| No. | Overall reign number |
| Reign | Reign number for the specific champion |
| Days | Number of days held |

| No. | Champion | Championship change | | | Reign statistics | | Notes | Ref. |
| No. | Champion | Date | Event | Location | Reign | Days | Notes | Ref. |
|---|---|---|---|---|---|---|---|---|
| 1 | Wildcat Pete | April 23, 1935 | BTW show | Honolulu, HI | 1 | 7 | Defeated Tetsuo Higami to become the first champion. | |
| 2 | Toots Estes | April 30, 1935 | BTW show | Honolulu, HI | 1 | N/A | | |
| — | Vacated | 1937 | — | — | — | — | Championship vacated for undocumented reasons | |
| 3 | Oki Shikina | November 16, 1937 | BTW show | Honolulu, HI | 1 | 434 | Defeated Rusty Wescoatt to win the vacant title. | |
| 4 | Dean Detton | January 24, 1939 | BTW show | Honolulu, HI | 1 | 14 | | |
| 5 | Dick Raines | February 7, 1939 | BTW show | Honolulu, HI | 1 | 56 | | |
| 6 | Oki Shikina | April 4, 1939 | BTW show | Honolulu, HI | 2 | 224 | | |
| 7 | Ignacio Martinez | November 14, 1939 | BTW show | Honolulu, HI | 1 | 14 | Won the title by forfeit after Shikina leaves the area. | |
| 8 | Paul Jones | November 28, 1939 | BTW show | Honolulu, HI | 1 | N/A | | |
| — | Vacated | February 1940 | — | — | — | — | Title vacated and renamed Hawaii Junior Heavyweight Championship. | |
| 9 | Billy Venable | April 24, 1940 | BTW show | Honolulu, HI | 1 | 70 | Defeated Kimon Kudo to win the vacant title. | |
| 10 | Tetsuo Higami | July 3, 1940 | BTW show | Honolulu, HI | 1 | 203 | | |
| 11 | Ben Pilar | January 22, 1941 | BTW show | Honolulu, HI | 1 | 182 | | |
| 12 | Tony Morelli | July 23, 1941 | BTW show | Honolulu, HI | 1 | 112 | | |
| 13 | Bill Weidner | November 12, 1941 | BTW show | Honolulu, HI | 1 | N/A | | |
Championship history is unrecorded from November 12, 1941 to 1942.
| 14 | Charley Carr | 1942 | BTW show | Hawaii | 1 | N/A | | |
Championship history is unrecorded from 1942 to 1945.
| 15 | Jimmy Gonsalves | 1945 | BTW show | Hawaii | 1 | N/A | Defeated Ben Sherman. | |
Championship history is unrecorded from 1945 to 1947.
| 16 | Lee Grable | 1947 | BTW show | Hawaii | 1 | N/A | | |
| 17 | Ted Travis | 1947 | BTW show | Hawaii | 1 | N/A | | |
| 18 | Lee Grable | May 2, 1948 | BTW show | Honolulu, HI | 2 | 98 | | |
| 19 | Hisao Tanaka | August 8, 1948 | BTW show | Honolulu, HI | 1 | 84 | | |
| 20 | Jack Claybourne | October 31, 1948 | BTW show | Honolulu, HI | 1 | 374 | | |
| 21 | Bobby Managoff | November 9, 1949 | BTW show | Honolulu, HI | 1 | 32 | | |
| 22 | Dean Detton | December 11, 1949 | BTW show | Honolulu, HI | 2 | 3 | | |
| 23 | Hans Schnabel | December 14, 1949 | BTW show | Honolulu, HI | 1 | 53 | | |
| 24 | Sandor Szabo | February 5, 1950 | BTW show | Honolulu, HI | 1 | 133 | | |
| 25 | Arjan Singh | June 18, 1950 | BTW show | Honolulu, HI | 1 | 28 | | |
| 26 | Ray Eckert | July 16, 1950 | BTW show | Honolulu, HI | 1 | 7 | | |
| 27 | Terry McGinnis | July 23, 1950 | BTW show | Honolulu, HI | 1 | 42 | | |
| 28 | Sandor Szabo | September 3, 1950 | BTW show | Honolulu, HI | 2 | N/A | | |
| — | Vacated | 1951 | — | — | — | — | Championship vacated for undocumented reasons | |
| 29 | Terry McGinnis | August 20, 1951 | BTW show | Honolulu, HI | 2 | 52 | Defeated Ted Travis to win the vacant title. | |
| 30 | Al Kashey | October 11, 1951 | BTW show | Honolulu, HI | 1 | 171 | | |
| 31 | Lucky Simunovich | March 30, 1952 | BTW show | Honolulu, HI | 1 | 49 | | |
| 32 | Red Scorpion (Tom Rice) | May 18, 1952 | BTW show | Honolulu, HI | 1 | N/A | | |
| — | Vacated | 1952 | — | — | — | — | Championship vacated for undocumented reasons | |
| 33 | Bobby Bruns | September 14, 1952 | BTW show | Honolulu, HI | 1 | 266 | Defeated Tom Rice to win the vacant title. | |
| 34 | Hans Schnabel | June 7, 1953 | BTW show | Honolulu, HI | 2 | 42 | | |
| 35 | Bobby Managoff | July 19, 1953 | BTW show | Honolulu, HI | 2 | 35 | | |
| 36 | Ben Sharpe | August 23, 1953 | BTW show | Honolulu, HI | 1 | 175 | | |
| 37 | Al Lovelock | February 14, 1954 | BTW show | Honolulu, HI | 1 | N/A | | |
| — | Vacated | May 1954 | — | — | — | — | Championship vacated for undocumented reasons | |
| 38 | Larry Moquin | May 23, 1954 | BTW show | Honolulu, HI | 1 | 49 | | |
| 39 | Karl Von Schober | July 11, 1954 | BTW show | Honolulu, HI | 1 | 49 | | |
| 40 | John Paul Henning | August 29, 1954 | BTW show | Honolulu, HI | 1 | 84 | | |
| 41 | Roger Mackay | November 21, 1954 | BTW show | Honolulu, HI | 1 | 84 | | |
| 42 | Lucky Simunovich | February 13, 1955 | BTW show | Honolulu, HI | 2 | 56 | | |
| 43 | The Zebra Kid (George Bollas) | April 10, 1955 | BTW show | Honolulu, HI | 1 | 250 | | |
| 44 | Al Lolotai | December 16, 1955 | BTW show | Honolulu, HI | 1 | 93 | | |
| 45 | Billy Varga | March 18, 1956 | BTW show | Honolulu, HI | 1 | 123 | | |
| 46 | Tosh Togo | July 19, 1956 | BTW show | Honolulu, HI | 1 | 80 | | |
| 47 | Tom Rice | October 7, 1956 | BTW show | Honolulu, HI | 2 | 224 | | |
| 48 | Al Lolotai | May 19, 1957 | BTW show | Honolulu, HI | 2 | 724 | | |
| 49 | Ed Francis | May 13, 1959 | BTW show | Honolulu, HI | 1 | 56 | | |
| 50 | Al Lolotai | July 8, 1959 | BTW show | Honolulu, HI | 3 | 560 | | |
| 51 | Dick Hutton | January 18, 1961 | BTW show | Honolulu, HI | 1 | 7 | | |
| 52 | Sam Steamboat | January 25, 1961 | BTW show | Honolulu, HI | 1 | 80 | | |
| 53 | Luigi Macera | April 15, 1961 | BTW show | Honolulu, HI | 1 | 60 | | |
| 54 | Neff Maiava | June 14, 1961 | BTW show | Honolulu, HI | 1 | 63 | | |
| 55 | King Curtis Iaukea | August 16, 1961 | BTW show | Honolulu, HI | 1 | 70 | | |
| 56 | Lord James Blears | October 25, 1961 | BTW show | Honolulu, HI | 1 | 49 | | |
| 57 | Masked Executioner | December 13, 1961 | BTW show | Honolulu, HI | 1 | 112 | | |
| 58 | Neff Maiava | April 4, 1962 | BTW show | Honolulu, HI | 2 | 317 | | |
| 59 | Gene LeBell | February 15, 1963 | BTW show | Honolulu, HI | 1 | 68 | | |
| 60 | Neff Maiava | April 24, 1963 | BTW show | Honolulu, HI | 3 | 288 | | |
| 61 | Hard Boiled Haggerty | February 6, 1964 | BTW show | Honolulu, HI | 1 | 62 | | |
| 62 | Neff Maiava | April 8, 1964 | BTW show | Honolulu, HI | 4 | 99 | | |
| 63 | Gene Kiniski | July 16, 1964 | BTW show | Honolulu, HI | 1 | 42 | | |
| 64 | Neff Maiava | August 27, 1964 | BTW show | Honolulu, HI | 5 | 41 | | |
| 65 | Johnny Barend | October 7, 1964 | BTW show | Honolulu, HI | 1 | 49 | | |
| 66 | Nick Bockwinkel | November 25, 1964 | BTW show | Honolulu, HI | 1 | 23 | | |
| 67 | King Curtis Iaukea | December 18, 1964 | BTW show | Honolulu, HI | 2 | 285 | | |
| 68 | Luther Lindsay | September 29, 1965 | BTW show | Honolulu, HI | 1 | 98 | | |
| 69 | Ron Reed | January 5, 1966 | BTW show | Honolulu, HI | 1 | 14 | | |
| 70 | Ripper Collins | January 19, 1966 | BTW show | Honolulu, HI | 1 | 217 | | |
| 71 | Neff Maiava | August 24, 1966 | BTW show | Honolulu, HI | 6 | 56 | | |
| 72 | Ripper Collins | October 19, 1966 | BTW show | Honolulu, HI | 2 | 147 | | |
| 73 | Jim Hady | March 15, 1967 | BTW show | Honolulu, HI | 1 | N/A | | |
| 74 | Dutch Schultz | August 1967 | BTW show | Hawaii | 1 | N/A | | |
| 75 | Jim Hady | October 14, 1967 | BTW show | Honolulu, HI | 2 | 137 | | |
| 76 | King Curtis Iaukea | February 28, 1968 | BTW show | Honolulu, HI | 3 | 182 | | |
| 77 | Klondike Bill | August 28, 1968 | BTW show | Honolulu, HI | 1 | 42 | | |
| 78 | Luke Graham | October 9, 1968 | BTW show | Honolulu, HI | 1 | N/A | | |
Championship history is unrecorded from October 9, 1968 to December 25, 1968.
| 79 | Nick Bockwinkel | December 25, 1968 | BTW show | Honolulu, HI | 2 | N/A | Defeated Johnny Barend to win the title. | |
Championship history is unrecorded from December 25, 1968 to December 29, 1968.
| 80 | King Curtis Iaukea | December 29, 1968 | BTW show | Honolulu, HI | 4 | N/A | | |
| 81 | The Missing Link | July 1969 | BTW show | Hawaii | 1 | N/A | | |
| 82 | Ripper Collins | October 29, 1969 | BTW show | Honolulu, HI | 3 | 77 | | |
| 83 | Sam Steamboat | January 14, 1970 | BTW show | Honolulu, HI | 2 | 21 | | |
| 84 | Ripper Collins | February 4, 1970 | BTW show | Honolulu, HI | 4 | 126 | | |
| 85 | Sam Steamboat | June 10, 1970 | BTW show | Honolulu, HI | 2 | 14 | | |
| 86 | Ripper Collins | June 24, 1970 | BTW show | Honolulu, HI | 5 | 35 | | |
| 87 | Sam Steamboat | July 29, 1970 | BTW show | Honolulu, HI | 3 | 98 | | |
| 88 | Ripper Collins | November 4, 1970 | BTW show | Honolulu, HI | 6 | 35 | | |
| 89 | Johnny Barend | December 9, 1970 | BTW show | Honolulu, HI | 2 | 24 | | |
| 90 | Ripper Collins | January 2, 1971 | BTW show | Honolulu, HI | 2 | 35 | | |
| 91 | Frankie Laine | February 6, 1971 | BTW show | Honolulu, HI | 1 | 18 | | |
| 92 | Mad Dog Mayne | February 24, 1971 | BTW show | Honolulu, HI | 1 | 245 | | |
| 93 | Ed Francis | October 27, 1971 | BTW show | Honolulu, HI | 2 | 112 | | |
| 94 | Gene Kiniski | February 16, 1972 | BTW show | Honolulu, HI | 2 | 168 | | |
| 95 | Fred Curry | August 2, 1972 | BTW show | Honolulu, HI | 1 | 80 | | |
| 96 | The Sheik | October 21, 1972 | BTW show | Honolulu, HI | 1 | 88 | | |
| 97 | Ed Francis | January 17, 1973 | BTW show | Honolulu, HI | 3 | 357 | | |
| 98 | "Superstar" Billy Graham | January 9, 1974 | BTW show | Honolulu, HI | 1 | N/A | | |
| — | Deactivated | N/A | — | — | — | — | 50th State Big Time Wrestling became inactive in July 1974. | |
| 99 | Bill Francis | July 1977 | BTW show | Hawaii | 1 | N/A | Defeated Steve Strong to win the reactivated title after 50th State Big Time Wrestling resumes operations. | |
| 100 | Steve Strong | January 1978 | BTW show | Hawaii | 1 | N/A | | |
| 101 | John Tolos | February 1978 | BTW show | Hawaii | 1 | N/A | | |
| 102 | John Anson | March 1978 | BTW show | Hawaii | 1 | N/A | | |
| 103 | Buddy Rose | May 1978 | BTW show | Hawaii | 1 | N/A | | |
| 104 | Don Muraco | July 1978 | BTW show | Hawaii | 1 | N/A | | |
| 105 | Tor Kamata | August 1978 | BTW show | Hawaii | 1 | N/A | | |
| 106 | Don Muraco | September 1978 | BTW show | Hawaii | 2 | N/A | | |
| 107 | Larry Sharpe | November 1978 | BTW show | Hawaii | 1 | N/A | Awarded title as he was top contender for the title following Muraco's defeat of Big John Studd for the NWA Pacific International Heavyweight Championship in September 1978. | |
| 108 | Mando Guerrero | November 22, 1978 | BTW show | Honolulu, HI | 1 | 30 | | |
| — | Vacated | December 22, 1978 | — | — | — | — | Championship vacated for undocumented reasons | |
| 109 | Mando Guerrero | January 1979 | BTW show | Honolulu, HI | 2 | N/A | | |
Championship history is unrecorded from January 1979 to March 5, 1979.
| 110 | Hans Schroeder | March 5, 1979 | BTW show | Honolulu, HI | 1 | N/A | | |
Championship history is unrecorded from March 5, 1979 to March 1979.
| 111 | Don Muraco | March 1979 | BTW show | Hawaii | 3 | N/A | | |
| — | Vacated | 1979 | — | — | — | — | Championship vacated for undocumented reasons | |
| 112 | Karl Von Steiger | April 4, 1979 | BTW show | Pearl Harbor, HI | 1 | 14 | Defeated Kevin Von Erich in a tournament final to win the vacant title. | |
| 113 | Siva Afi | April 18, 1979 | BTW show | Hawaii | 1 | N/A | | |
| 114 | Ripper Collins | N/A | BTW show | Hawaii | 2 | N/A | | |
| 115 | Peter Maivia | March 1980 | BTW show | Hawaii | 1 | N/A | | |
| 116 | Hans Schroeder | March 5, 1980 | BTW show | Hawaii | 2 | N/A | | |
| 117 | Tama Tonga | April 1980 | BTW show | Hawaii | 1 | N/A | | |
| 118 | Wildman Austin | July 1980 | BTW show | Hawaii | 1 | N/A | | |
| 119 | Tor Kamata | October 1980 | BTW show | Hawaii | 2 | N/A | | |
| — | Vacated | 1980 | — | — | — | — | Title vacated when Kamata was injured by the Samoans. | |
| 120 | Keethan Hawke | February 5, 2000 | BTW show | Hawaii | 1 | N/A | Title awarded when it is revived by the NWA for use in the Island Xtreme Wrestling Federation. | |
| — | Vacated | June 2000 | — | — | — | — | Title vacated when Hawke left the IXWF. | |
| 121 | Dark Ninja | July 16, 2000 | BTW show | Waipahu, HI | 1 | 42 | Defeated Black Rain and Don Lee in a three-way match to win the vacant title. | |
| 122 | Black Rain | August 27, 2000 | BTW show | Kāne'ohe, HI | 1 | 237 | Defeated The Jet, subbing for Dark Ninja. | |
| 123 | The Jet | April 21, 2001 | BTW show | Kāne'ohe, HI | 1 | 119 | | |
| 124 | Johnny Allback (Black Rain) | August 18, 2001 | BTW show | Kāne'ohe, HI | 2 | 49 | | |
| 125 | The Sassy Assassin | October 6, 2001 | BTW show | Kāne'ohe, HI | 2 | 14 | | |
| 126 | Johnny Allback | October 20, 2001 | BTW show | Kāne'ohe, HI | 3 | 257 | | |
| 127 | Kaimana | July 4, 2002 | BTW show | Honolulu, HI | 1 | 136 | | |
| 128 | Tiki | November 17, 2002 | BTW show | Honolulu, HI | 1 | 223 | | |
| 129 | Sickdog | June 28, 2003 | BTW show | Honolulu, HI | 1 | 175 | | |
| 130 | Tiki | December 20, 2003 | BTW show | Honolulu, HI | 2 | 84 | | |
| 131 | Kris Kavanaugh | March 13, 2004 | BTW show | Honolulu, HI | 1 | 478 | | |
| 132 | Superfly Ete | July 4, 2005 | BTW show | Pearl Harbor, HI | 1 | 137 | | |
| 133 | Kenjiro Katahira | November 18, 2005 | BTW show | Honolulu, HI | 1 | N/A | Katahira unified the NWA Hawaii title with Hawai'i Championship Wrestling's Kamehameha Heritage Championship. | |
| — | Vacated | March 2006 | — | — | — | — | Katahira vacated both his championships upon returning to Japan. | |
| 134 | Kaimana | March 25, 2006 | BTW show | Wahiawā, HI | 2 | 49 | Defeated Ahuna, Kapu and Jody Lopez in a four-way elimination match to win the vacant title. | |
| 135 | Kapu | May 13, 2006 | BTW show | Wahiawā, HI | 1 | 378 | | |
| 136 | Sickdog | May 26, 2007 | BTW show | Honolulu, HI | 2 | 84 | | |
| 137 | Jody Lopez | August 18, 2007 | BTW show | Honolulu, HI | 1 | 0 | | |
| 138 | Sickdog | August 18, 2007 | BTW show | Honolulu, HI | 3 | 568 | | |
| 139 | Kapu | March 8, 2009 | BTW show | N/A | 2 | 118 | | |
| 140 | J.T. Wolfen | July 4, 2009 | BTW show | Pearl Harbor, HI | 1 | N/A | | |
| — | Deactivated | 2010 | — | — | — | — | | |

== See also ==
- National Wrestling Alliance
