= NWA World Tag Team Championship (Indianapolis version) =

Professional wrestling tag team championship

Details
- Promotion: NWA Indianapolis office
- Date established: No later than September 16, 1951
- Date retired: 1960
Statistics
- First champion: Ben and Mike Sharpe

The Indianapolis version of the NWA World Tag Team Championship, which was actively used between 1951 and 1960, was a professional wrestling championship exclusively for two-man tag teams. As a member of the National Wrestling Alliance (NWA), the NWA Indianapolis territory was entitled to create an NWA World Tag Team Championship that they could promote within the boundaries of their territory, in this case Indiana, making it a "regional" championship despite being labeled a "world championship". Because the use of the championship was not restricted to one overall championship, a large number of different, regional championships bore the name "NWA World Tag Team Championship" between 1949 and 1992. In 1957 as many as 13 different versions were promoted across the United States.^{[Championships]} As it is a professional wrestling championship, it is not won or lost competitively but instead by the decision of the bookers of a wrestling promotion. The title is awarded after the chosen team "wins" a match to maintain the illusion that professional wrestling is a competitive sport.

The Indianapolis NWA World Tag Team Championship was introduced in 1951 as promoters Jim Barnett, Fred Kohler, Dick Patton, and Balk Estes decided to bring Ben and Mike Sharpe in from the West Coast to be their first champions. While the Sharpe brothers were being promoted as having won a tournament, no records of such a tournament has been found, making it likely they were simply announced as champions when they arrived in Indianapolis. In late 1951 the team of Rudy Kay and Al Williams, who worked for NWA Indianapolis on a regular basis, defeated the Sharpe brothers to cement the championship lineage in Indianapolis, while the Sharpe brothers returned to the West Coast. The team of Boris and Nicoli Volkoff won the championship on three occasions, setting a record for both teams and individuals. Reggie Lisowski and Stan Lisowski's first reign as champions lasted at least 243 days, the longest of any individual reign, and their two combined reigns totaled at least 342 days, as least 150 days longer than the second-longest combined reigns. Due to the fact that no dates were captured as part of the championship documentation, it is impossible to determine which team had the shortest reign.

== Title history ==
Key

Symbol	Meaning
No.	The overall championship reign
Reign	The reign number for the specific wrestler listed.
Event	The event in which the championship changed hands
N/A	The specific information is not known
[Note #]	Indicates that the exact length of the title reign is unknown, with a note providing more details.
	Indicates that there was a period where the lineage is undocumented due to the lack of written documentation in that time period.
(nlt)	Indicates that a title change took place "no later than" the date listed. (Note: Documentation of the specific date of a title change is not found but documentation of the champion holding the title on that date/in that period.)

No.	Champions	Reign	Date	Days held	Location	Event	Notes	Ref(s)
1	Ben and Mike Sharpe	1	September 16, 1951 (NLT)	(Note: The exact date that the Sharpe brothers won and lost the championship is uncertain which means that the reign lasted between 1 day and at least 81 days.)	(Note: The location of the match was not captured as part of the documentation.)	Live event	Records are unclear on how they became champions	
2	Rudy Kay and Al Williams	1	December 6, 1951 (NLT)	(Note: The exact date that Kay and Williams won and lost the championship is uncertain which means that the reign lasted between 1 day and 855 days.)		Live event	Billed as champions on a show in Elwood, Indiana	
3	Guy Brunetti and Joe Tangaro	1	January 19, 1954 (NLT)	(Note: The exact date that Brunetti and Tangaro won and lost the championship is uncertain which means that the reign lasted at least 1 day.)		Live event	During a show in Logansport, Indiana on May 12, 1954, the team was billed as the "Midwest Tag Team Champions", believed to be the same championship.	
4	Reggie Lisowski and Stan Lisowski	1	March 26, 1956 (NLT)	(Note: The exact date that Lisowski and Neilson won the championship is uncertain which means that the reign lasted at least 243 days.)		Live event	Supposedly had "recently" defeated Brunetti and Tangaro and Brunetti for the championship	
5	Boris and Nicoli Volkoff	1	November 24, 1956	(Note: The exact date that the Volkoffs lost the championship is uncertain which means that the reign lasted at least 1 day.)	Milwaukee, Wisconsin	Live event	The Lisowski brothers were still recognized as champions in Indianapolis, but not Wisconsin	
6	Seymoure King and Johnny Gilbert	1	June 6, 1956 (NLT)	(Note: The exact date that King and Gilbert won the championship is uncertain which means that the reign lasted between 1 day and 24 days.)		Live event	billed as champion on a show in Angola, Indiana on this date	
7	Sheik of Araby and Angelo Poffo	1	June 30, 1956 (NLT)	(Note: The exact date that the Sheik and Poffo won the championship is uncertain which means that the reign lasted at least 194 days.)		Live event	Billed as champions on a show in Valparaiso, Indiana on this date	
8	Boris and Nicoli Volkoff	2	January 10, 1957	(Note: The exact date that the Volkoffs lost the championship is uncertain which means that the reign lasted between 151 days and 180 days.)	Indianapolis, Indiana	Live event		
9	Reggie Lisowski and Stan Lisowski	2	June 1957	(Note: The exact date that the Lisowskis won the championship is uncertain which means that the reign lasted between 109 days and 138 days.)		Live event		
10	Guy Brunetti and Joe Tangaro	2	October 17, 1957	(Note: The exact date that Brunetti and Tangaro lost the championship is uncertain which means that the reign lasted between 1 day and 55 days.)	Indianapolis, Indiana	Live event	Still billed as champions on December 5, 1957	
11	The Fabulous Fargos (Jackie and Don)	1	December 11, 1957 (NLT)	(Note: The exact date that the Fargos won and lost the championship is uncertain which means that the reign lasted between 1 day and 355 days.)		Live event	The Fargos would defend the Mid-America version in and around Indiana until at least April 16, 1958	
12	Boris and Nicoli Volkoff	2	November 25, 1958 (NLT)	(Note: The exact date that Borne and Tolos won/lost the championship is uncertain which means that the reign lasted between 1 day and 254 days.)		Live event	First billed as champions on a show in Elwood, Illinois; still billed as champions on January 29, 1959	
13	Roy and Ray Shire	1	August 6, 1959	(Note: The exact date that the championship was abandoned, which means that the reign lasted at least 148 days.)	Indianapolis, Indiana	Live event	Defeated Dick Afflis and Angelo Poffo in tournament final to win the vacant championship	
—	Abandoned	—	1960	N/A	N/A	N/A	The championship was replaced by the AWA World Tag Team Championship when the Indiana territory left the NWA.	

== Team reigns by combined length ==
Key

Symbol	Meaning
¤	The exact length of at least one title reign is uncertain, so the shortest possible length is used.

Rank	Team	No. of reigns	Combined days
1	Reggie Lisowski and Stan Lisowski	2	352¤
2	Sheik of Araby and Angelo Poffo	1	194¤
3	Boris and Nicoli Volkoff	3	153¤
4	Roy and Ray Shire	1	148¤
5	Guy Brunetti and Joe Tangaro	2	2¤
6	The Fabulous Fargos (Jackie Fargo and Don Fargo)	1	1¤
6	Seymoure King and Johnny Gilbert	1	1¤
6	Ben and Mike Sharpe	1	1¤
6	Rudy Kay and Al Williams	1	1¤

== Individual reigns by combined length ==
Key

Symbol	Meaning
¤	The exact length of at least one title reign is uncertain, so the shortest possible length is used.

Rank	Wrestler	No. of reigns	Combined days
1	Stan Lisowski	2	352¤
1	Reggie Lisowski	2	352¤
3	Sheik of Araby	1	194¤
3	Angelo Poffo	1	194¤
5	Boris Volkoff	3	153¤
5	Nicoli Volkoff	3	153¤
7	Roy Shire	1	148¤
7	Ray Shire	1	148¤
9	Guy Brunetti	2	2¤
9	Joe Tangaro	2	2¤
11	Jackie Fargo	1	1¤
11	Seymoure King	1	1¤
11	Ben Sharpe	1	1¤
11	Rudy Kay	1	1¤
11	Don Fargo	1	1¤
11	Johnny Gilbert	1	1¤
11	Mike Sharpe	1	1¤
11	Al Williams	1	1¤

== Concurrent championships ==
Sources for 13 simultaneous NWA World Tag Team Championships

- NWA World Tag Team Championship (Los Angeles version)
- NWA World Tag Team Championship (San Francisco version)
- NWA World Tag Team Championship (Central States version)
- NWA World Tag Team Championship (Chicago version)
- NWA World Tag Team Championship (Buffalo Athletic Club version)
- NWA World Tag Team Championship (Georgia version)
- NWA World Tag Team Championship (Iowa/Nebraska version)
- NWA World Tag Team Championship (Indianapolis version)
- NWA World Tag Team Championship (Salt Lake Wrestling Club version)
- NWA World Tag Team Championship (Amarillo version)
- NWA World Tag Team Championship (Minneapolis version)
- NWA World Tag Team Championship (Texas version)
- NWA World Tag Team Championship (Mid-America version)
