= NWA World Tag Team Championship (Iowa/Nebraska version) =

Professional wrestling tag team championship

Details
- Promotion: NWA Nebraska office NWA Iowa office
- Date established: No later than August 11, 1953
- Date retired: 1958
Statistics
- First champions: Bill Melby and Billy Darnell
- Longest reign: Guy Brunetti and Joe Tangaro (At least 98 days)

The Iowa/Nebraska version of the NWA World Tag Team Championship was a National Wrestling Alliance (NWA) professional wrestling tag team championship that was active between 1953 and 1958. The championship was controlled by the NWA's Iowa booking office under Pinkie George and the Nebraska booking office under Max Clayton. Both George and Clayton were founding members of the NWA in 1948 and served on the Board of Directors that decided to let any NWA member, known as a NWA territory to create a local version of the NWA World Tag Team Championship. The Iowa/Nebraska version was one of at least 13 championships bearing that name in 1957.^{[Championships]} As with all professional wrestling championships, this championship was not won or lost competitively but instead based on the decisions of the bookers of a wrestling promotion which determines the outcome of the matches.

A version of the NWA World Tag Team Championship was promoted in Nebraska as early as May 4, 1949, but it is possible that it was the San Francisco version that Mike and Ben Sharpe defended in the region. The Iowa/Nebraska lineage was firmly established in the summer of 1953, no later than on August 11 of that year, when Bill Melby and Billy Darnell were recognized as champions in Iowa and Nebraska. Melby and Darnell also held the Chicago version at the time, but when they lost the championship to Ben and Mike Sharpe on October 17, 1953, only the Iowa/Nebraska version changed hands. In 1958 it was decided to replace the NWA World Tag Team Championship with the Big Time Wrestling World Tag Team Championship, which in turn would be replaced with the AWA World Tag Team Championship in 1960 when a number of promotions left the NWA to form the American Wrestling Association (AWA).

Four teams share the record for the most championship reigns (2), as the teams of Ben and Mike Sharpe, Boris and Nicol Volkoff, The Kalmikoffs (Ivan and Karol Kalmikoff), and Reggie Lisowski and Art Neilson were the only teams to hold the title more than once. Due to the lack of specific dates for many of the championship changes, it is impossible to clearly establish which team had the shortest reign, while the longest reign probably belongs to Guy Brunetti and Joe Tangaro who held the championship for at least 98 days.

== Title history ==
Key

Symbol	Meaning
No.	The overall championship reign
Reign	The reign number for the specific wrestler listed.
Event	The event in which the championship changed hands
N/A	The specific information is not known
[Note #]	Indicates that the exact length of the title reign is unknown, with a note providing more details.
	Indicates that there was a period where the lineage is undocumented due to the lack of written documentation in that time period.
(nlt)	Indicates that a title change took place "no later than" the date listed. (Note: Documentation of the specific date of a title change is not found but documentation of the champion holding the title on that date/in that period.)

No.	Champions	Reign	Date	Days held	Location	Event	Notes	Ref(s)
1	Ben Sharpe and Mike Sharpe	1	May 4, 1949 (NLT)	(Note: The exact length of the championship reign is too uncertain to calculate.)	N/A	Live event	The Sharpes were billed as champions upon arrival. Could have been the San Francisco version that was defended in the region. Still billed as champions in Nebraska on January 18, 1950	
2	Bill Melby and Billy Darnell	1	August 11, 1953 (NLT)	(Note: The exact date that Melby and Darnell won the championship is uncertain, which means that this reign lasted at least 67 days.)	Chicago, Illinois	Live event	Melby and Darnell won the Chicago version on July 15, 1953, Recognized in Iowa on August 11, 1953	
3	Ben Sharpe and Mike Sharpe	2	October 17, 1953	(Note: The exact date that the Sharpe brothers lost the championship is uncertain, which means that this reign lasted between 1 day and 135 days.)	Chicago, Illinois	Live event	Still billed as champions on December 9, 1953	
4	Reggie Lisowski and Art Neilson	1	March 1, 1954 (NLT)	(Note: The exact that Lisowski and Neilson won championship is uncertain, which means that this reign lasted at least 748 days.)	(Note: The location of the match was not captured as part of the documentation.)	Live event	The team defeated Melby and Darnell for Chicago version February 13, 1954. Change recognized in Iowa with the storyline being that they "recently" defeated the Sharpe Brothers.	
5	Pat O'Connor and Roy McClarty	1	March 19, 1955	(Note: The exact date that O'Connor and McClarty lost the championship is uncertain, which means that this reign lasted between 1 day and 16 days.)	Moline, Illinois	Live event		
6	Reggie Lisowski and Art Neilson	2	April 4, 1955 (NLT)	(Note: The exact date that Crusher and Neilson won and lost the championship is uncertain, which means that this reign lasted between 1 day and 210 days.)		Live event	Still billed as champions on August 22, 1955	
7	Guy Brunetti and Joe Tangaro	1	October 16, 1955 (NLT)	(Note: The exact date that Brunetti and Tagaro won the championship is uncertain, which means that this reign lasted between 98 days and 292 days.)		Live event	Was reported as having defeated Lisowski and Nelson, but no record of such a match has been found	
8	Mike DiBiase and Danny Plechas	1	January 22, 1956	(Note: The exact date that DiBiase and Plechas lost the championship is uncertain, which means that this reign lasted between 1 day and 107 days.)	Des Moines, Iowa	Live event	Championship match was repeated on February 18, 1956 in Moline, Illinois. Still billed as champions on March 1.	
10	The Kalmikoffs (Ivan and Karol Kalmikoff)	1	May 8, 1956 (NLT)	(Note: The exact date that The Kalmikoffs won and lost the championship is uncertain, which means that this reign lasted between 1 day and 259 days.)		Live event	Still billed as champions on August 5, 1956	
11	Boris and Nicoli Volkoff	1	October 6, 1956 (NLT)	(Note: The exact date that the Volkoffs won the championship is uncertain, which means that this reign lasted between 28 days and 178 days.)		Live event		
12	Bobby Bruns and Roy McClarity	1	November 3, 1956	(Note: The exact date that Bruns and McClarity lost the championship is uncertain, which means that this reign lasted between 1 day and 222 days.)	Des Moines, Iowa	Live event	Still billed as champions on January 21, 1957	
13	The Kalmikoffs (Ivan and Karol Kalmikoff)	2	June 13, 1957 (NLT)	(Note: The exact date that the Kalmikoffs won and lost the championship is uncertain, which means that this reign lasted between 1 day and 245 days.)		Live event	Billed as champions on a show in Omaha, Nebraska	
14	Boris and Nicoli Volkoff	2	October 25, 1957 (NLT)	(Note: The exact date the championship was abandoned is uncertain, which means that this reign lasted at least 68 days.)		Live event	Recognized in Iowa, later recognized as champions in Nebraska on April 25, 1958	
—	Abandoned	—	1958	N/A	N/A	N/A	Replaced with the Omaha version of the World Tag Team Title Championship.	

== Team reigns by combined length ==
Key

Symbol	Meaning
¤	The exact length of at least one title reign is uncertain, so the shortest possible length is used.

Rank	Team	No. of reigns	Combined days
1	Reggie Lisowski and Art Neilson	2	749¤
2	The Kalmikoffs (Ivan Kalmikoff and Karol Kalmikoff)	2	142¤
3	Guy Brunetti and Joe Tangaro	1	98¤
4	Boris and Nicoli Volkoff	2	96¤
5	Bill Melby and Billy Darnell	1	67¤
6	Bobby Bruns and Roy McClarity	1	1¤
6	Ben Sharpe and Mike Sharpe	2	1¤
6	Mike DiBiase and Danny Plechas	1	1¤
6	Pat O'Connor and Roy McClarty	1	1¤

== Individual reigns by combined length ==
Key

Symbol	Meaning
¤	The exact length of at least one title reign is uncertain, so the shortest possible length is used.

Rank	Wrestler	No. of reigns	Combined days
1	Art Neilson	2	749¤
1	Reggie Lisowski	2	749¤
4	Ivan Kalmikoff	2	142¤
4	Karol Kalmikoff	2	142¤
6	Guy Brunetti	1	98¤
6	Joe Tangaro	1	98¤
8	Boris Volkoff	2	96¤
8	Nicoli Volkoff	2	96¤
11	Billy Darnell	1	67¤
11	Bill Melby	1	67¤
13	Roy McClarity	2	2¤
14	Bobby Bruns	1	1¤
14	Danny Plechas	1	1¤
14	Ben Sharpe Sharpe	2	1¤
14	Mike Sharpe	2	1¤
14	Mike DiBiase	1	1¤
14	Pat O'Connor	1	1¤

== Concurrent championships ==
Sources for 13 simultaneous NWA World Tag Team Championships

- NWA World Tag Team Championship (Los Angeles version)
- NWA World Tag Team Championship (San Francisco version)
- NWA World Tag Team Championship (Central States version)
- NWA World Tag Team Championship (Chicago version)
- NWA World Tag Team Championship (Buffalo Athletic Club version)
- NWA World Tag Team Championship (Georgia version)
- NWA World Tag Team Championship (Iowa/Nebraska version)
- NWA World Tag Team Championship (Indianapolis version)
- NWA World Tag Team Championship (Salt Lake Wrestling Club version)
- NWA World Tag Team Championship (Amarillo version)
- NWA World Tag Team Championship (Minneapolis version)
- NWA World Tag Team Championship (Texas version)
- NWA World Tag Team Championship (Mid-America version)
