= Lord James Blears =

British-American professional wrestler (1923–2016)

- Blears in 1949, in his wrestling persona "Lord Blears"

Personal information
- Born: James Ranicar Blears; 13 August 1923 Tyldesley, Lancashire, England
- Died: 3 March 2016 (aged 92) Honolulu, Hawaii, U.S.
- Spouse: Leonora Adelaina (died 2007)
- Family: 4; including Jimmy Blears and Laura Lee Ching

Professional wrestling career
- Ring name(s): Jan Blears; Lord James Blears
- Billed height: 6 ft 0 in (183 cm)
- Billed weight: 233 lb (106 kg)
- Trained by: YMCA
- Debut: 1940

Signature
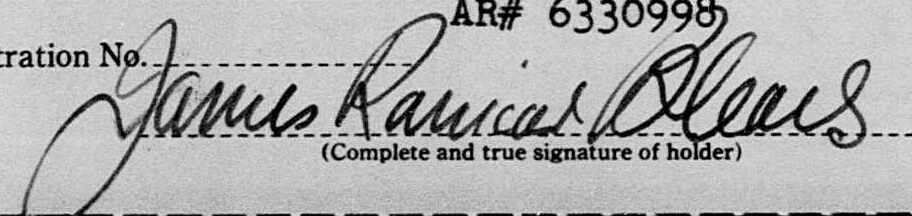

Lord James "Tally-Ho" Blears (born James Ranicar Blears, 13 August 1923 – 3 March 2016) was a British-American professional wrestler, ring announcer, promoter, actor, mariner, and surfing personality. While serving in the British Merchant Navy in 1940, Blears narrowly escaped being summarily executed by Japanese during a WWII incident out at sea. Blears became a US citizen and became something of a celebrity in Hawaii where he lived until his death in a nursing home.

== Early life ==
Blears was born in Tyldesley, Lancashire, England in the United Kingdom on 13 August 1923. An accomplished swimmer in school, he was selected for the British swimming team for the 1940 Summer Olympics but was unable to compete given their cancellation due to World War II.

== Merchant navy career ==
Blears enlisted in the Merchant Navy in 1940 during World War II at the age of 17. With his knowledge of Morse code he became a radio officer. Whilst serving as second wireless operator on board the SS Tjisalak, a Dutch merchant ship, his ship was torpedoed by the Japanese submarine I-8 on 26 March 1944 during a voyage from Melbourne, Australia to Colombo, Ceylon (now Sri Lanka). The survivors were taken prisoner by the Japanese and the majority were summarily executed by beheading. Blears managed to escape by leaping into the water and found his way into a lifeboat, where he and four other survivors began attempting to sail to Ceylon until the United States Navy liberty ship SS James O. Wilder retrieved them three days later. Blears was given a can of peaches by his rescuers and celebrated every year thereafter on March 29 by eating a can of peaches.

== Professional wrestling career ==
Blears learned to wrestle at the YMCA, debuting in 1940 at the age of 17. He wrestled sporadically around the world during his wartime service in the merchant navy.

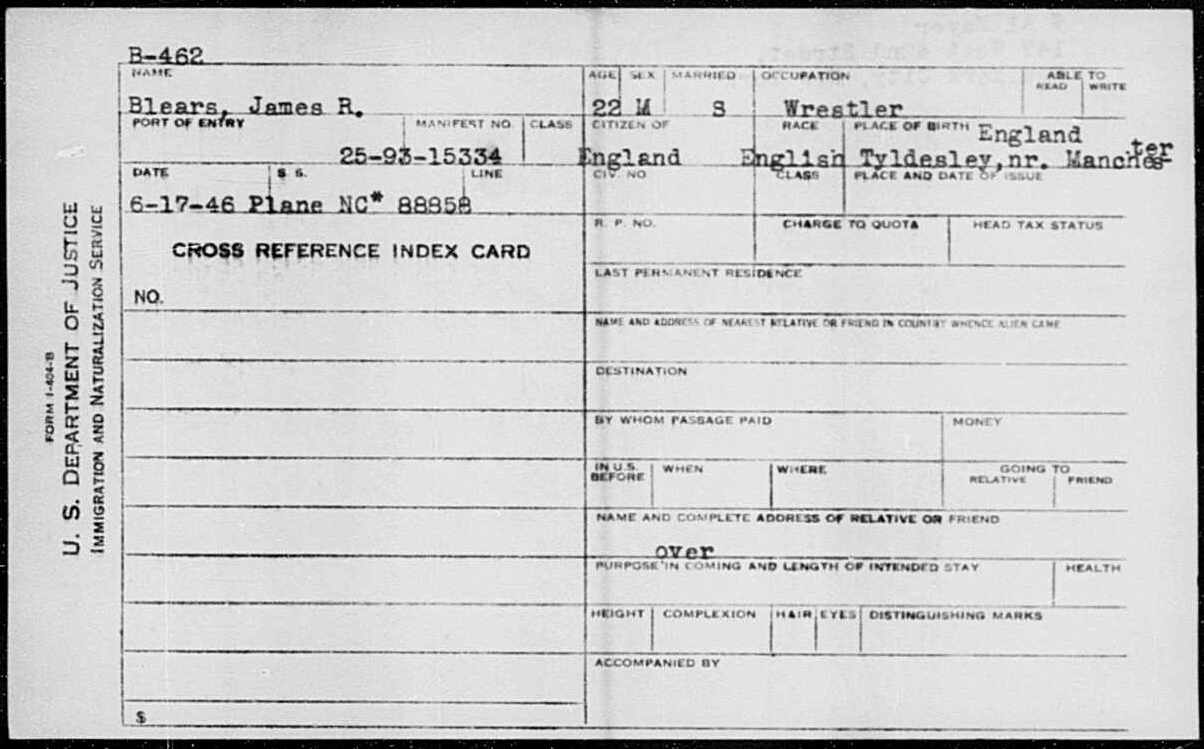
James Blears 1946 immigration record

In 1946, he relocated to New York City in the United States, where he shared an apartment on Amsterdam Avenue with fellow wrestlers Stu Hart and Sandor Kovacs. Early in his United States career, Blears wrestled as "Jan Blears".

In the early 1950s, Blears developed the villainous character of "Lord Blears", a snooty British aristocrat who wore a cape and monocle and carried a cane. He was managed by the tuxedo-wearing Captain Leslie Holmes, a friend of Blears' from his schooldays who had also traveled to the United States.

In the early 1950s, Blears relocated to California. In 1952, he formed a tag team with Lord Athol Layton. Managed by Holmes, in 1953, they won the NWA World Tag Team Championship (Chicago version) in the Chicago-based Fred Kohler Enterprises. Blears also wrestled for Worldwide Wrestling Associates, where he held the WWA International Television Tag Team Championship eight times between 1954 and 1957, and for NWA San Francisco, where he held the NWA Pacific Coast Tag Team Championship (San Francisco version) on two occasions in 1953 and 1954 with Layton and the NWA World Tag Team Championship (San Francisco version) four times between 1955 and 1957.

In 1957, Blears wrestled in Australia, unsuccessfully challenging Lou Thesz for the NWA World Heavyweight Championship on several occasions.

In the late 1950s, Blears relocated to Hawaii after developing a fondness for the state during a tour, where he built his career in the Honolulu-based promotion 50th State Big Time Wrestling. Blears had a single reign as NWA Hawaii Heavyweight Champion, defeating King Curtis Iaukea on 25 October 1961. He lost the championship to the Masked Executioner on 13 December 1961. Blears also held the NWA Hawaii Tag Team Championship numerous times between 1955 and 1964.

At the invitation of Rikidōzan, Blears began wrestling in Japan in the 1950s. After the death of Rikidōzan in 1963, Giant Baba – the owner of All Japan Pro Wrestling – asked him to identify foreign wrestlers to perform for AJPW. Blears arranged for wrestlers such as Davey Boy Smith, Don Leo Jonathan and Dynamite Kid to tour Japan. From 1973 to 2001, Blears made appearances with AJPW as an on-screen authority figure under the title of chairman of the Pacific Wrestling Federation.

Blears stopped wrestling full-time in 1965, transitioning to a commentator for the Hawaiian Championship Wrestling broadcast and the booker for the promotion.

In the 1980s, Blears provided commentary for the American Wrestling Association's broadcasts on ESPN. At the AWA supercard "Super Sunday" on April 24, 1983, Blears served as guest referee for a high-profile title bout between Hulk Hogan and AWA World Heavyweight Champion Nick Bockwinkel that saw Bockwinkel retain via a Dusty finish.

== Acting career ==
Blears made his first acting appearance in 1950, playing a dramatized version of himself in an episode of The Buster Keaton Show.

In 1966, Blears appeared in the surfing documentary The Endless Summer, playing himself. He played himself once more in the 1974 professional wrestling movie The Wrestler. In 1987, he appeared in the surfing movie North Shore.

Blears appeared in an episode of Hawaii Five-O in 1977 and in episodes of Magnum, P.I. filmed in Hawaii in 1982 and 1983.

== Personal life ==
Blears was born in Tyldesley, Lancashire in the United Kingdom, but moved to the United States in the mid-1940s and ultimately successfully applied for United States citizenship.

While living in Chicago, Blears met Leonora "Lee" Adelaina (died 2007), whom he would ultimately marry. The couple had four children: two sons, James Jr. ("Jimmy") (1948–2011) and Clinton, and two daughters, Laura (born 1951) and Carol. All four rose to prominence as professional surfers, since Blears had the children surfing at Mākaha and Waikiki from the time they could walk.

Blears legally changed his name to "Lord Blears".

Blears was an avid fan of surfing. He served as commentator and master of ceremonies for many surfing events in Hawaii, earning him the title, "the voice of Hawaiian surfing".

== Death ==
Blears declined hip surgery and spent many years bedridden in a private hospital in Honolulu until his death. His friends, including other wrestlers such as Dick Beyer, visited him and encouraged Blears to have his hips operated on but Blears did not want the surgery. Blears's wife Leonora predeceased him in 2007. His eldest child, Jimmy, died in 2011. Blears died on 3 March 2016 in the Kuakini Medical Center in Honolulu at the age of 92.

== Filmography ==
=== Film ===
Year	Title	Role	Notes
1966	The Endless Summer	Himself	
1974	The Wrestler	Himself	
1987	North Shore	Contest director	

=== Television ===
Year	Title	Role	Notes
1950	The Buster Keaton Show	Himself	Episode: "Buster in Training"
1977	Hawaii Five-O	Arfie Loudermilk	Episode: "You Don't See Many Pirates These Days"
1982	Magnum, P.I.	Ring announcer	Episode: "Mr. White Death"
1983	Magnum, P.I.	Bartender	Episode: "Squeeze Play"

== Championships and accomplishments ==
- 50th State Big Time Wrestling
  - NWA Hawaii Heavyweight Championship (1 time)
  - NWA Hawaii Tag Team Championship (9 times) – with Gene Kiniski (1 time), Joe Blanchard (2 times), Jerry Gordet (1 time), Herb Freeman (1 time), and Neff Maiava (4 times)
- Fred Kohler Enterprises
  - NWA World Tag Team Championship (Chicago version) (1 time) – with Lord Athol Layton
- NWA San Francisco
  - NWA Pacific Coast Tag Team Championship (San Francisco version) (2 times) – with Lord Athol Layton
  - NWA World Tag Team Championship (San Francisco version) (4 times) – with Gene Kiniski (3 times) and Ben Sharpe (1 time)
- Professional Wrestling Hall of Fame
  - Class of 2019
- Worldwide Wrestling Associates
  - WWA International Television Tag Team Championship (8 times) – with Lord Athol Layton (2 times), Joe Pazandak (1 time), Sandor Kovacs (1 time), Lord Leslie Carlton (2 times), Henry Lenz (1 time), and Nick Bockwinkel (1 time)
