= Peter Maivia =

Samoan professional wrestler (1937–1982)

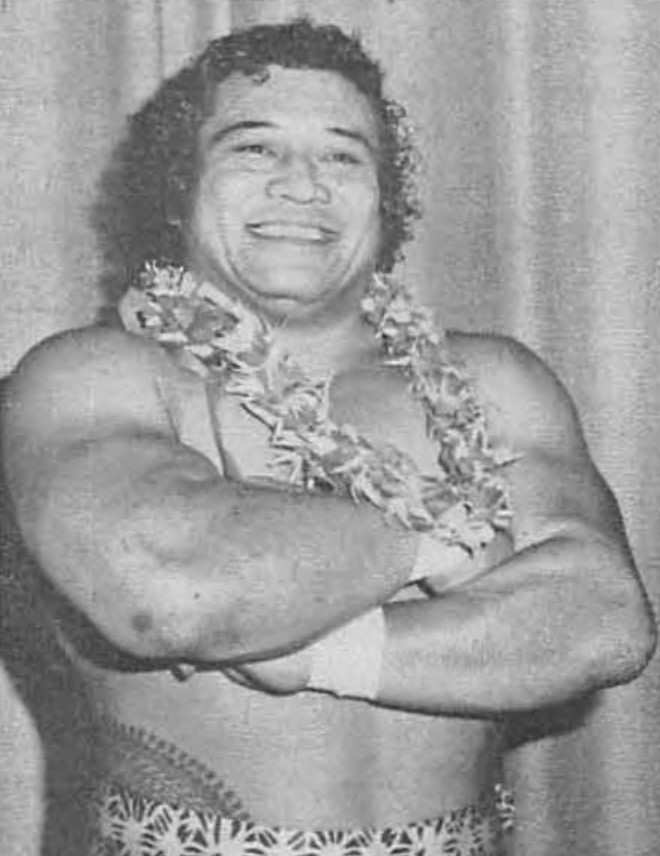
- Maivia in 1979

Personal information
- Born: Fanene Pita Anderson; April 6, 1937 Western Samoa
- Died: June 13, 1982 (aged 45) Honolulu, Hawaii, U.S.
- Cause of death: Cancer
- Spouse: Lia Maivia (m. 1953)
- Children: 2
- Relatives: Dwayne Johnson (grandson); Nia Jax (first cousin once removed); Roman Reigns (grandnephew)
- Family: Anoaʻi family

Professional wrestling career
- Ring name(s): Prince Peter Maivia; High Chief Peter Maivia
- Billed height: 5 ft 9 in (175 cm)
- Billed weight: 275 lb (125 kg)
- Billed from: "The Isle of Samoa"
- Trained by: Steve Rickard
- Debut: 1960
- Retired: February 11, 1982

Fanene Leifi Pita Maivia (born Fanene Pita Anderson; April 6, 1937 – June 13, 1982), known by his ring name "High Chief" Peter Maivia, was a Samoan professional wrestler. Maivia was the grandfather of Dwayne "The Rock" Johnson and was also part of the famous Anoaʻi family via blood brother pact. He was also the promoter of the National Wrestling Alliance member Polynesian Pro Wrestling in Hawaii.

== Early life ==
Maivia was born Fanene Pita Anderson in 1937 in Western Samoa, then administered as a territory of New Zealand. He was of the Ali'i lineage of Malietoa, and held the ceremonial title of High Chief, which would be reflected by his wrestling persona.

He spent his early life in Samoa and New Zealand, and practiced amateur wrestling as a teenager. Perennial rival Fritz von Goering later noted "Peter was a great wrestler, in fact, he was a great amateur wrestler. He made a lot of good moves. He wrestled barefoot. He moved like a lightweight or a middleweight."

Prior to his professional wrestling career, Anderson worked as a plumber.

== Professional wrestling career ==
=== Early career (1960–1964) ===
Anderson made his debut in 1960 at the age of 23, after being trained by Steve Rickard. He was initially billed as Peter Fanene Anderson or just Peter Anderson. He worked for NWA Hawaii, and in France and the United Kingdom, and was nicknamed as "the Flyinʻ Hawaiian".

=== New Zealand and Australia (1964–1968) ===
After spending his first twenty years in American Samoa, Maivia moved to New Zealand. He began competing, wrestling under the ring name Prince Peter Maivia, after another Samoan wrestler, Neff Maiava. He was trained in New Zealand by local wrestler and promoter Steve Rickard.

Both in and out of the ring, Rickard taught the young Samoan a great deal about professional wrestling, and under his guidance, Maivia developed at an amazing rate. On 3 August 1964, after less than a year in the business, he won the New Zealand Heavyweight Championship. The title victory was impressive, however Maivia's reign was extremely short, and he held the championship for just three days, with the championship returning to Rickard on August 6, 1964. The point had been made though, and from then onward, Maivia enjoyed main-event status in the NWA's New Zealand territory.

Later in 1964, Maivia followed up his previous success by winning the NWA Australasian Heavyweight Championship. Maivia became the new Australasian champion by defeating Kangaroo Kennedy, and he carried the belt for four years before finally losing it to Steve Rickard in 1968. After developing his repertoire and ring skills in New Zealand, Maivia slowly began to branch out and take bookings in larger promotions.

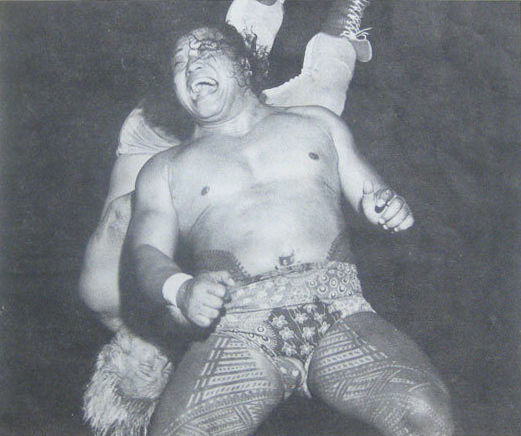
Maivia in 1975

=== Various promotions (1968–1977) ===
Maivia continued working mainly in Hawaii during most of his career. In 1968 he worked for International Wrestling Enterprise in Japan. From 1969 to 1975 he worked in NWA San Francisco, NWA Hollywood, WCCW, Houston Wrestling, and the AWA winning many championships in the process.

=== World Wide Wrestling Federation (1977–1981) ===
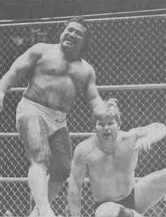
Maivia (left) pulls Bob Backlund (right) by the hair during their steel cage match, circa 1979

He joined the World Wide Wrestling Federation in mid-1977. He was one of the company's biggest stars, working matches with many top wrestlers such as Superstar Billy Graham, Ivan Putski and Bob Backlund. He turned heel in 1978 on Backlund in a match against Spiros Arion and Victor Rivera. During his tenure in the WWWF, he also competed in Hawaii, Japan, Toronto, Detroit, San Francisco, Los Angeles and New Zealand. He left the WWWF, which had now been renamed to the WWF, in 1981.

=== Later career (1981–1982) ===
After leaving the WWF, Maivia returned to California and won the NWA Americas Heavyweight Championship. He wrestled in his last match in Hawaii in February 1982, defeating Victor Rivera in a singles match. He retired on February 11, 1982, due to his battle with cancer.

== Film work ==
Maivia was also an actor, appearing in the fifth James Bond film, You Only Live Twice, where he played a henchman who fights Bond (played by Sean Connery). He was also a fight choreographer on the film.

== Personal life ==
Maivia's traditional Samoan tattoos, which covered his abdomen and legs, were a symbol of his High Chief status. According to Superstar Billy Graham, they were completed in three days.

His wife Ofelia Fuataga, more commonly known as Lia Maivia, was one of the first female professional wrestling promoters. Maivia adopted Lia's daughter Mataniu Feagaimaleata "Ata" Fitisemanu.

Maivia was the blood brother of Amituanai Anoaʻi, the father of the Wild Samoans (Afa and Sika), and thus the Anoaʻi family regard the Maivia family as part of their own family.

=== Death ===
In 1981, Maivia was diagnosed with inoperable cancer, having reportedly ignored symptoms along with his friends and family's requests to see a doctor. He died on June 13, 1982.

== Legacy ==
Maivia was posthumously inducted into the WWE Hall of Fame, along with his daughter's ex-husband Rocky Johnson, in 2008 by his grandson Dwayne Johnson, with the award being accepted on his behalf by his daughter Ata Maivia-Johnson.

In the 2016 Disney animated film, Moana, the character design of Maui was derived from photographs of Peter Maivia, according to interviews with his grandson, Dwayne Johnson, who voices Maui in the film.

== Championships and accomplishments ==
- All Japan Pro-Wrestling
  - PWF United States Heavyweight Championship (1 time)
- 50th State Big Time Wrestling
  - NWA Hawaii Heavyweight Championship (1 time)
  - NWA Hawaii Tag Team Championship (4 times) – with Jim Hady (1), Billy White Wolf (1), and Sam Steamboat (2)
- NWA All-Star Pro Wrestling
  - NWA Australasian Heavyweight Championship (2 times)
  - NWA New Zealand Heavyweight Championship (1 time)
- NWA Big Time Wrestling
  - NWA Texas Heavyweight Championship (2 times)
- NWA Hollywood Wrestling
  - NWA Americas Heavyweight Championship (1 time)
  - NWA "Beat the Champ" Television Championship (2 times)
- NWA New Zealand
  - NWA New Zealand British Empire Commonwealth Heavyweight Championship (2 times)
- NWA San Francisco
  - NWA United States Heavyweight Championship (San Francisco version) (2 times)
  - NWA World Tag Team Championship (San Francisco version) (1 time) – with Ray Stevens
- Professional Wrestling Hall of Fame
  - Class of 2016
- World Wrestling Entertainment
  - WWE Hall of Fame (Class of 2008)

== See also ==
- List of premature professional wrestling deaths
