= Buddy Austin =

American professional wrestler

Personal information
- Born: Austin Wesley Rapes; February 27, 1929 Lovejoy, Georgia, U.S.
- Died: August 12, 1981 (aged 52) San Joaquin, California, U.S.
- Cause of death: Myocardial infarction
- Spouse: Carmelita Rogers

Professional wrestling career
- Ring name(s): Austin Rogers; Buddy Austin; Bulldog Austin; Francis Gabor; Frank Gabor; Frankie Gabor
- Billed height: 6 ft 2 in (188 cm)
- Billed weight: 240 lb (109 kg)
- Trained by: Roy Graham
- Debut: 1956
- Retired: March 30, 1977

Austin Wesley Rogers (born Austin Wesley Rapes; February 27, 1929 – August 13, 1981) was an American professional wrestler, better known by the ring name "Killer" Buddy Austin. He is best known for his appearances with the Los Angeles, California-based Worldwide Wrestling Associates promotion in the mid-1960s, where he held the WWA World Heavyweight Championship and the WWA World Tag Team Championship on three occasions each.

== Early life ==
Rogers was born Austin Wesley Rapes in Lovejoy, Georgia. Prior to beginning his professional wrestling career, he served in the United States Navy.

== Professional wrestling career ==
=== Early career (1956–1962) ===
Rogers was trained by Roy Graham, making his professional wrestling debut in 1956. Early in his career, he wrestled under the ring name "Frankie Gabor", teaming with Johnny Gabor as "the Gabor Brothers". By the late-1950s, Rogers had adopted the ring name "Buddy Austin", nicknaming himself "the Golden Gladiator" in reference to his bleached blond hair. During this time, he trained future NWA World Heavyweight Champion Harley Race while working for Gust Karras in the Midwest.

In 1961, Austin began wrestling for Heart of America Sports Attractions as "Bulldog Austin", briefly holding the NWA Central States Tag Team Championship. In mid-1961, he reverted to "Buddy Austin", and in June 1961 he was awarded the vacant NWA Central States Heavyweight Championship. He held the championship until November 1961, when he was defeated by Sonny Myers. Austin won the championship a second time that month, defeating Tarzan Tyler, His second reign lasted until February 1962, when he lost to Ray Gordon.

Austin made his first tour of Japan with the Japan Wrestling Association in 1962, competing in the fourth annual World Big League. In June 1962, Austin and Mike Sharpe defeated Rikidōzan and Toyonobori to win the All Asia Tag Team Championship. They held the championship for slightly under a month before losing to Rikidōzan and Toyonobori in a rematch.

In late-1962, Austin adopted the nickname "Killer" and was given credit for injuring Buddy Rogers, who had been involved in a car accident. He built the character of an "arrogant heel" and "ruthless rule-breaker". In March 1963, Austin and Great Scott defeated Buddy Rogers and Johnny Barend for the NWA United States Tag Team Championship (northeast version). During their reign, the Capitol Wrestling Corporation withdrew from the NWA, and the championship was renamed the WWWF United States Tag Team Championship. In May 1963, Austin and Great Scott were defeated for the championship by Brute Bernard and Skull Murphy. At this time, Austin was one of the major challengers to WWWF Champion Buddy Rogers.

Austin subsequently travelled to Ottawa, where later that month he won a tournament for the vacant Canadian Heavyweight Championship.

=== Worldwide Wrestling Associates (1962–1969) ===
In 1962, Austin joined the Los Angeles, California-based Worldwide Wrestling Associates promotion, where he achieved his greatest success. In April 1966, he and El Mongol defeated Alberto Torres and Thunderbolt Patterson for the WWA World Tag Team Championship. They lost the championship to Luis Hernández and Pedro Morales in June 1966.

Austin went on to compete for the WWA World Heavyweight Championship. His first reign began in August 1966 when he defeated Pedro Morales. He lost the championship to Bobo Brazil in September 1966, but regained it in a rematch two weeks later. His second reign ended in October 1966 when he was defeated by Lou Thesz. Austin won the championship for a third and final time in August 1967, defeating Iron Mike DiBiase. During his reign, he formed a tag team with Freddie Blassie, and the duo defeated Pedro Morales and Victor Rivera for the WWA World Tag Team Championship a second time in September 1967. In December 1967, Austin and Blassie were defeated by Morales and Antonio Pugliese, but they defeated them in a rematch later that month to regain the championship.

Austin's third reign as WWA World Heavyweight Champion ended in January 1968 when he lost to Bobo Brazil, while his third reign as WWA World Tag Team Champion ended in May 1968 when he and Blassie lost to Los Medicos de Mexico. Austin and Blassie subsequently began feuding, facing one another in a stretcher match that sold out the Grand Olympic Auditorium in November 1968.

=== Later career (1967–1977) ===
In May 1967, Austin won a 16-man tournament for the vacant NWA Texas Heavyweight Championship, defeating Paul DeMarco in the final. He held the championship until August 1967, when he lost to Buddy Moreno.

In April 1969, Austin and Ripper Collins defeated Bobby Shane and Nick Bockwinkel for the NWA Hawaii Tag Team Championship. Their reign ended in August 1969 when they lost to Ed Francis and Pedro Morales.

In December 1969, Austin and King Curtis Iaukea defeated Mario Milano and Spiros Arion for the IWA World Tag Team Championship, with their reign lasting until early 1970.

In June 1971, Austin and Bob Orton defeated Archie Gouldie and Bob Geigel for the NWA North American Tag Team Championship. Their reign ended in August 1971 when they lost to Steve Bolus and Rufus R. Jones.

Austin retired on March 30, 1977.

== Personal life ==
Born Wesley Austin Rapes, Rogers legally changed his name to Austin Wesley Rogers.

Rogers was married to Carmelita, with whom he had several children. In June 1968, Rogers' 15-month-old twin daughters drowned in the swimming pool of his home in Woodland Hills, Los Angeles, California.

On January 1, 1969, Rogers was shot in the stomach and Pedro Morales was slashed with a broken bottle during an altercation at a party held in a penthouse in King's Cross, Sydney, Australia. Rogers recovered, but bore a distinctive scar on his abdomen for the remainder of his life.

Rogers was a heavy drinker. In the mid-1960s, Freddie Blassie refused to continue teaming with Rogers due to his propensity to wrestle while inebriated.

== Death ==
Rogers died on August 12, 1981, from a myocardial infarction.

== Championships and accomplishments ==
- 50th State Big Time Wrestling
  - NWA Hawaii Tag Team Championship (1 time) – with Ripper Collins
- All Japan Pro Wrestling
  - All Asia Tag Team Championship (1 time) – with Mike Sharpe
- Big Time Wrestling
  - NWA Texas Heavyweight Championship (1 time)
- Capitol Wrestling Corporation
  - NWA United States Tag Team Championship (northeast version) (1 time) – with Great Scott
- Championship Wrestling from Florida
  - NWA Southern Heavyweight Championship (Florida version)
- Heart of America Sports Attractions
  - NWA Central States Heavyweight Championship (2 times)
  - NWA Central States Tag Team Championship (1 time) – with Tarzan Kowalski/Don McClarity
  - NWA North American Tag Team Championship (1 time) – with Bob Orton
- Ottawa Wrestling
  - Canadian Heavyweight Championship (1 time)
- World Championship Wrestling
  - IWA World Tag Team Championship (1 time) – with King Curtis Iaukea
- Worldwide Wrestling Associates
  - WWA World Heavyweight Championship (3 times)
  - WWA World Tag Team Championship (3 times) – with Freddie Blassie (2 times) and El Mongol (1 time)
