= Pampero Firpo =

Argentine-American professional wrestler (1930–2020)

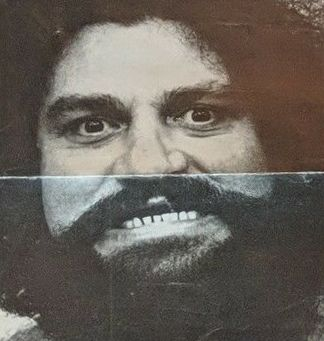
- Firpo in 1969

Personal information
- Born: Juan Kachmanian; April 6, 1930 Buenos Aires, Argentina
- Died: January 9, 2020 (aged 89) San Jose, California, U.S.

Professional wrestling career
- Ring name(s): Ervan the Armenian; The Great Pampero; Ivan the Terrible; The Missing Link; Pampero Firpo; Wild Bull of the Pampas
- Billed height: 5 ft 8 in (173 cm)
- Billed weight: 230 lb (104 kg)
- Billed from: Buenos Aires, Argentina
- Trained by: Rudy Dusek
- Debut: 1953
- Retired: 1986

Juan Kachmanian (April 6, 1930 – January 9, 2020) was an Argentine-born Armenian-American professional wrestler, better known by his ring name, Pampero Firpo. He is perhaps most known for his work in Detroit, Michigan's Big Time Wrestling promotion.

== Early life ==
Kachmanian was born on April 6, 1930, in Buenos Aires, Argentina. His parents were of Armenian descent and born in Turkey. His father was sent to Greece in an orphanage run by the British Red Cross. The Pampero Firpo name was appealing to Kachmanian as his father was a 'real shooter' and was a contender for the Olympics. Firpo's father later moved from Greece to Lebanon and then to Argentina, where he became a local boxing promoter.

== Professional wrestling career ==
Having been trained by Rudy Dusek, he made his debut in 1953 and wrestled variously as Ervan the Armenian, Ivan the Terrible, The Missing Link, The Great Pampero and the Wild Bull of the Pampas, as well as his most famous alter-ego of Pampero Firpo. Boxing great Jack Dempsey gave him the name "Pampero Firpo." Until then he had been wrestling as Ivan The Terrible. He was looking for a gimmick and Dempsey, recalling one of his famous opponents in the 1920s, Argentine boxer "Wild Bull of the Pampas" Luis Ángel Firpo, suggested that the grappler be billed as Firpo's son.

An early pioneer of hardcore wrestling, Kachmanian usually wrestled as a heel, although he would go on to have a run as a face after being fireballed by The Sheik. The bushy-haired Firpo packed a powerful punch with his stocky, 5–8, 230-pound frame, engaging in bloody feuds with stars such as The Sheik, Bobo Brazil, Johnny Valentine, Wild Bull Curry, The Crusher and The Mighty Igor, with most of his victories coming from a crushing bear hug or a dreaded claw hold that he called "El Garfio", a trademark death grip that would allegedly render his opponents unconscious.

It was in his homeland of Argentina where Firpo, while staying at a hotel frequented by the ruling Perón family, was introduced to "Chimu", purportedly the shrunken head of a tribal leader from Ecuador. According to the story, a tribesman had been so impressed with Firpo's strength and athletic ability that he awarded the grappler the macabre oddity. Firpo would later put the shrunken head to good use, enhancing his image as a heel of the first order by talking to and rubbing the head during interviews while promising the destruction of his opponents.

In 1972, Pampero Firpo captured the NWA United States Heavyweight Championship (Detroit version) twice after defeating Bobo Brazil on both occasions – on August 12 and October 28, respectively. Both title reigns were ended by Bobo Brazil in return matches with the championship on the line. Firpo would go on to win the championship one more time on July 17, 1976, from then 9-time NWA United States Heavyweight Champion The Sheik. Firpo would hold onto the championship until October 16, 1976, when he lost it to Don Kent. Firpo was a mainstay in Detroit for the Big Time Wrestling promotion alongside The Sheik and Bobo Brazil.

Also, in 1972, Firpo wrestled six matches with the World Wide Wrestling Federation, now known as WWE. He competed with and defeated Manuel Soto, Rene Goulet, Ben Justice, and Chief Jay Strongbow in matchups at Madison Square Garden in New York. On May 22, 1972, Firpo competed for the WWWF Heavyweight Title against Pedro Morales at Madison Square Garden, but was defeated. Firpo would have a second chance at the championship two months later in Philadelphia, on July 8, 1972, against Morales in another losing effort.

Other titles Firpo held in his career were the NWA World Tag Team Championship (Texas version), the NWA Texas Heavyweight Championship and the NWA Hawaii Heavyweight Championship, as well as being the inaugural holder of the NWA Americas Heavyweight Championship. Kachmanian popularized the drawn-out catchphrase 'ohhh yeah!' which would later become associated with Randy Savage.

After March 1981, Kachmanian stopped actively competing after a tour of Japan in the fall of 1980, a quick stint in California in January 1981 and a short stint in Texas in March 1981. He retired from professional wrestling on October 17, 1986, after competing in 8,882 matches, after last competing for All-Star California Championship Wrestling in 1986 and winning the CCW Heavyweight Championship from Victor Rivera at the Olympic Auditorium in Los Angeles. Firpo won a 20-man Battle Royal the previous month at the Olympic Auditorium to become #1 Contender and challenge Rivera.

== Personal life ==
Kachmanian became an American citizen in 1965 and named it as one of his proudest moments. He visited five continents, 21 countries, and became fluent in eight languages.

Kachmanian's working days didn't end once his 33-year wrestling career was over. He spent the next 25 years working for the United States Postal Service in San Jose, California, retiring at the age of 78. Kachmanian had three children, John, Juli, and Mary, and resided in an assisted living facility in Campbell, California. He died of natural causes on January 9, 2020, in Campbell, California.

== Championships and accomplishments ==
- NWA Tri-State
  - NWA World Junior Heavyweight Championship (1 time)
- American Wrestling Association
  - Nebraska Heavyweight Championship (1 time)
- All-California Championship Wrestling
  - ACCW Heavyweight Championship (1 time) 1986
- Big Time Wrestling
  - NWA United States Heavyweight Championship (Detroit version) (3 times)
- Cauliflower Alley Club
  - Other honoree (2001)
- Jim Crockett Promotions
  - NWA Southern Tag Team Championship (Mid-Atlantic version) (1 time) – with Larry Hamilton
- Mid-Pacific Promotions
  - NWA Hawaii Heavyweight Championship (1 time)
  - NWA Hawaii Tag Team Championship (2 times) – with Neff Maiava (1) and Jim Hady (1, as Missing Link)
- NWA Hollywood Wrestling
  - NWA Americas Heavyweight Championship (3 times, first)
  - NWA Americas Tag Team Championship (1 time) – with Jack Evans
- Pacific Northwest Wrestling
  - NWA Pacific Northwest Heavyweight Championship (1 time)
- Professional Wrestling Hall of Fame
  - Class of 2018
- Southwest Sports/NWA Big Time Wrestling
  - NWA Texas Heavyweight Championship (1 time)
  - NWA World Tag Team Championship (1 time) – with Tony Borne
- World Wrestling Council
  - WWC Puerto Rico Heavyweight Championship (1 time)
