= King Curtis Iaukea =

American professional wrestler (1937–2010)

Personal information
- Born: Curtis Piehu Iaukea III; September 15, 1937 Honolulu, Territory of Hawaii
- Died: December 4, 2010 (aged 73) Honolulu, Hawaii, U.S.

Professional wrestling career
- Ring name(s): King Curtis Iaukea; Prince Kuhio; The Wizard; Prince Curtis Iaukea; The Master
- Billed height: 6 ft 3 in (1.91 m)
- Billed weight: 290 lb (130 kg)
- Debut: 1955
- Retired: 1980

Curtis Piehu Iaukea III (September 15, 1937 – December 4, 2010) was an American professional wrestler better known as King Curtis Iaukea. Iaukea won championships in several of the major regional U.S. promotions, both as a single and in various tag team combinations, during the 1960s. He then competed in the World Wrestling Federation (WWF) where he won the WWF Tag Team Championship with Baron Scicluna. He also wrestled Pedro Morales for the WWWF title. He was also later The Master of the Dungeon of Doom in World Championship Wrestling (WCW). Under the name "Iau Kea" he appeared in the film The Three Stooges Go Around the World in a Daze with Moe Howard declaring "That's not a man! That's a committee!".

== Early life ==
He was the great-grandson of Colonel Curtis P. Iaukea, a royal chamberlain and diplomat to the court of King Kalākaua and Queen Liliuokalani and son of Honolulu Police Department Inspector Curtis Iaukea II. He attended Punahou School and the University of California Berkeley as an economics major where he lettered as a lineman until he left in his third year to pursue professional football. He played as a tackle for the BC Lions from 1958 to 1959 and the Montreal Alouettes in 1959. He was also in camp with the Oakland Raiders in 1960.

== Professional wrestling career ==
=== Wrestling ===
Iaukea came to Don Owen's Pacific Northwest territory, commonly known as Portland Wrestling in 1961, wrestling under the moniker Prince Kuhio. Teaming with Haru Sasaki, the two would capture the NWA Pacific Northwest Tag Titles on January 19, 1962, holding them for two months. A year later, while traveling between Oregon and the Hawaiian Islands, King Curtis would capture the NWA Pacific Northwest Heavyweight Title on September 5, 1963, In Australia, King Curtis was a part of the face tag team known as the People's Army with Mark Lewin and Spiros Arion.

His first sojourns to Australia were in the 1964–1965 season, where he was a heel. He was teamed with Skull Murphy. King Curtis initially wrestled as Curtis Iaukea in his first run in Australia. The King Curtis tag was the one that stuck as he feuded against Mark Lewin. After becoming a fan favorite in the seventies, King Curtis feuded against Tiger Jeet Singh and The Tojo Brothers (Hiro 'The Great' Tojo and Hito Tojo) from Japan. King Curtis was also a member of an alliance known as "The People's Army."

=== Management ===
After retiring in 1980, he turned to managing. In ICW, known as King Curtis, he managed Kevin Sullivan and Mark Lewin, taking on the gimmick of a crazed cult leader. His faction feuded with Joe Savoldi and Austin Idol. In the 80's, he also appeared with Sullivan in Championship Wrestling from Florida as "The Chairman of the Board".

Curtis Iaukea re-appeared briefly in the WWF promotion in 1986 as The Wizard, a manager and mouthpiece for Kamala. The Wizard claimed to be in communion with the spirit of the late original Grand Wizard. He later teamed Kamala with Sika before selling the pair to Mr Fuji. Then, Iaukea left the WWF in 1987.

He also appeared briefly in WCW as 'The Master' of the Dungeon of Doom stable in 1995, reuniting with both Kamala and Sullivan (who, as Dungeon leader, would address Iaukea as "my father", and he would address Sullivan as "my son") His role in the Dungeon was to conjure up new Dungeon members for Sullivan's war with Hulk Hogan. He would leave WCW by the end of 1995.

== Personal life and death ==
Iaukea had a son named Rocky Iaukea.

Iaukea also had a daughter, Sydney Lehua Iaukea, a 'Native Hawaiian educator'. Iaukea focuses on Hawaiian politics, and has particularly studied her relation to her great-great-grandfather, Curtis P. Iaukea. In an article published in the Hawaiian Journal of Law and Politics in 2021, Iaukea discusses her father, stating that 'many still remember his wrestling matches, and the showmanship and wrestling character he embodied'. Yet, he left his family without financial or familial support, but she was 'left speechless because of the larger-than-life image my father so masterfully displayed'.

On December 4, 2010, Iaukea died at his home in Papakolea.

== Championships and accomplishments ==
- 50th State Big Time Wrestling
  - NWA Hawaii Heavyweight Championship (4 times)
  - NWA United States Heavyweight Championship (Hawaii version) (6 times)
- Big Time Wrestling (San Francisco)
  - NWA United States Heavyweight Championship (San Francisco version) (1 time)
- NWA All-Star Pro Wrestling
  - NWA British Empire/Commonwealth Heavyweight Championship (1 time)
- American Wrestling Alliance
  - AWA United States Heavyweight Championship (1 time)
- Championship Wrestling from Florida
  - NWA Florida Heavyweight Championship (2 times)
- NWA Western States Sports
  - NWA Western States Heavyweight Championship (1 time)
- Pacific Northwest Wrestling
  - NWA Pacific Northwest Heavyweight Championship (1 time)
  - NWA Pacific Northwest Tag Team Championship (1 time) - with Haru Sasaki
- Professional Wrestling Hall of Fame and Museum
  - Class of 2020
- World Championship Wrestling (Australia)
  - IWA World Heavyweight Championship (4 times)
  - IWA World Tag Team Championship (3 times) - with Buddy Austin (1) and Mark Lewin (2)
  - World Brass Knuckles Championship
- World Wide Wrestling Federation
  - WWWF World Tag Team Championship (1 time) with Baron Mikel Scicluna
- Wrestling Observer Newsletter
  - Wrestling Observer Newsletter Hall of Fame (Class of 2011)
