= Gene Kiniski =

Canadian professional wrestler (1928–2010)

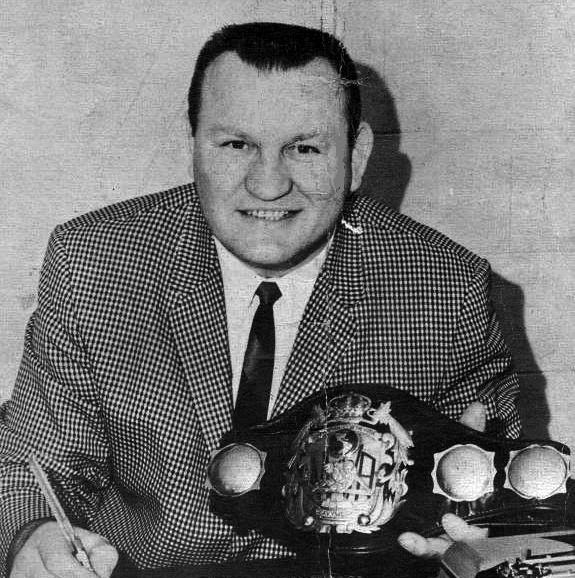
- Kiniski in 1966

Personal information
- Born: Eugene Nicholas Kiniski; 23 November 1928 Edmonton, Alberta, Canada
- Died: 14 April 2010 (aged 81) Blaine, Washington, U.S.
- Spouse: Marion Kiniski
- Children: Kelly Kiniski, Nick Kiniski

Professional wrestling career
- Ring name(s): Gene Kiniski; Gene Kelly; Mighty Canadian; Big Thunder
- Billed height: 193 cm (6 ft 4 in)
- Billed weight: 122 kg (270 lb)
- Trained by: Dory Funk; Tony Morelli
- Debut: February 13, 1952
- Retired: February 25, 1992

Eugene Nicholas Kiniski (23 November 1928 – 14 April 2010) was a Canadian professional wrestler and football player. He played three seasons in the Canadian Football League (CFL) for the Edmonton Eskimos, as a defensive tackle, and was also a collegiate player for the University of Arizona. Billed as "Canada's Greatest Athlete", was one of the first world champions in professional wrestling to have a previous background in football.

He was the father of professional wrestler Kelly Kiniski and international amateur and professional wrestler Nick Kiniski.

== Early life ==
One of six children to Polish immigrants of local politician Julia Kiniski (and her husband Nicholas), Gene Kiniski grew up in Edmonton. At the age of seventeen, he was over six feet tall. Kiniski wrestled and played football at St. Joseph's High School. In March 1947, he entered the annual Edmonton School's Boxing and Wrestling Tournament at Westglen gymnasium. Due to his size, he was the lone heavyweight competing.

== Football career ==
Kiniski captured the attention of Annis Stukus, a scout for the Edmonton Eskimos, of the then Western Interprovincial Football Union in 1949, (which later merged with the Interprovincial Rugby Football Union to form the Canadian Football League). Along with Kiniski, wrestlers Al Oeming and Stu Hart were at the training camp as well. Two of his Eskimos teammates were future wrestlers Wilbur Snyder and Joe Blanchard.

Kiniski secured himself a spot on the defensive line and his play earned him a scholarship to the University of Arizona. He was enrolled there from September 18, 1950, to January 26, 1952, and played on the defensive line for Bob Winslow. Rod Fenton recruited Kiniski into professional wrestling in Arizona in 1952.

Kiniski returned to Edmonton to play football for the Eskimos, and he suffered a torn kneecap in the team's first game against Saskatchewan in August 1952. He retired from football in 1953 to resume wrestling full-time.

== Professional wrestling career ==
=== Early career (1952–1956) ===
After retiring from football, Kiniski trained with Dory Funk and Tony Morelli for a wrestling career, eventually making his pro debut on February 13, 1952, in Tucson, Arizona, where he defeated Curly Hughes. Kiniski's first exposure on television was in Southern California in 1954 alongside other wrestlers such as Wilbur Snyder and Bobo Brazil. One year later, he teamed up with John Tolos to win his first major championship, the International TV Tag Team title, in Los Angeles, then challenged NWA World Champion Lou Thesz in November 1954. As an emerging talent, Kiniski got the opportunity to wrestle Lou Thesz at the Olympic Auditorium on November 3, 1954. Kiniski lost in two straight falls.

From there, Kiniski ventured to San Francisco and teamed with Lord James Blears to win the territory's version of the NWA World Tag Team title three times in 1955; after that, he went to Texas and, wrestling as Gene Kelly, captured the NWA Texas Heavyweight Championship in 1956.

=== Toronto and Montreal (1956–1960) ===
Kiniski began wrestling in his native Canada for the first time in November 1956, debuting for Toronto's Maple Leaf Wrestling. His first main-event match in the territory took place at Maple Leaf Gardens in January 1957, when he teamed with Buddy Rogers against Whipper Billy Watson and Pat O'Connor and saw the beginning of a lengthy feud with Watson that spanned across Canada; the Kiniski-Watson feud gained national exposure due to their matches sometimes being seen on CBC Television. He also challenged NWA World Heavyweight titleholders Watson, Thesz and Dick Hutton for the title on several occasions between 1955 and 1957.

In 1957, Kiniski competed in Montreal and Toronto. His feuds with Whipper Billy Watson, Yukon Eric, Édouard Carpentier, and Pat O'Connor pushed his career further.

Gene captured the British Empire title from O'Connor on May 2, 1957, and the Montreal version of the world title from Carpentier on June 12, 1957. Kiniski headlined a wrestling card at Delormier stadium in Montreal, where he dropped the Montreal world title to Killer Kowalski on July 17, 1957, in front of 21,000 fans. In 1959, Kiniski teamed with Don Leo Jonathan, "The Mormon Giant" to win the Canadian Open Tag Team Championship.

=== Championship runs (1960–1966) ===
Kiniski joined the American Wrestling Association (AWA) in 1960 and defeated AWA World Champion Verne Gagne to win the title on July 11, 1961, also capturing the AWA World Tag Team title twice with Hard Boiled Haggerty. Like Bronko Nagurski before him, was one of the first world champions in professional wrestling to have a previous background in football. The title reign lasted less than a month. Kiniski won another title in West Texas a year later.

In 1962, Kiniski began what became the peak period of his career when he went to Vancouver to join NWA: All-Star Wrestling. Early on, he won the NWA British Empire Heavyweight title twice and the Pacific Coast Tag Team title three times, and he challenged again for the NWA World title, taking on Rogers in a main event at Empire Stadium in Vancouver on July 30, 1962 (Rogers beat Kiniski to retain his title), and Thesz in 1963. He made Vancouver his home base while also making appearances in other promotions throughout North America and in Japan, particularly a lengthy stint in the World Wide Wrestling Federation (WWWF, now WWE) in 1964; while there, he challenged WWWF Champion Bruno Sammartino several times. Kiniski wrestled Sammartino on November 16, 1964, at Madison Square Garden. Thinking that he had pinned Sammartino in the second fall, Kiniski took the belt and left the ring. Despite being counted out, Kiniski kept the title until a rematch on December 14 settled the matter of who was the real champion.

He also went to Dick the Bruiser's Indianapolis-based World Wrestling Association in December 1965 and captured its World Heavyweight title, holding it for four months. A few weeks later, Kiniski earned the opportunity to contend for the National Wrestling Alliance World Heavyweight title.

The pinnacle of Kiniski's career finally came on January 7, 1966, when he defeated Thesz to win the NWA World Heavyweight Championship in St. Louis, Missouri, in front of 11,612 fans at the Kiel Auditorium in St. Louis.

=== Heel champion (1966–1969) ===
Compared to Thesz, Kiniski was a heel and was very comfortable in his role as a "bad guy" world champion. As world champion, Kiniski wrestled many well-known luminaries. These included Bobo Brazil, Dick the Bruiser, Johnny Valentine, Bill Watts, Édouard Carpentier, Pat O'Connor, and the Funks, Terry and Dory, Jr., respectively.

He travelled worldwide to defend his title during his three-year reign as champion, including making frequent stops back in Vancouver to defend his title in NWA All Star, taking on challengers such as Lou Thesz, Don Leo Jonathan, Dutch Savage, Bill Dromo, Bearcat Wright, John Tolos, Chris Tolos, Abdullah the Butcher, Haystacks Calhoun, Bobby Shane, Dean Higuchi, Tex McKenzie and Paddy Barrett in the promotion.

After stops in Honolulu, Tokyo, and becoming the first World Champion to appear in Los Angeles in more than 11 years in November 1968, Kiniski was exhausted. At the 1968 NWA Convention, Kiniski announced that it was time to step down. He agreed to lose the championship to Dory Funk, Jr., and eventually went down to a spinning toehold on February 11, 1969, in Tampa. He later claimed for a WWE DVD that he lost accidentally, submitting early to the toehold while assuming the match was a two of three falls encounter.

=== 1970–1983 ===
The NWA World Championship loss was not the end of the line, as Kiniski continued winning championships in NWA All Star and elsewhere. He won the NWA Missouri Heavyweight title from Terry Funk in St. Louis on March 16, 1973, while back in Vancouver, he won the Pacific Coast Heavyweight title seven times from 1970 to 1979, and won the Canadian Tag Team title ten times between 1963 and 1976, and in Japan, he captured the NWA International Heavyweight title in 1970. He also got involved in the promotional side of the business when he joined forces with Sandor Kovacs and Portland promoter Don Owen to acquire the Vancouver territory in the late 1960s; that, combined with Kiniski's NWA World title reign at the time, helped make Vancouver a wrestling hotbed for several years, until Kovacs sold his share in the promotion to Al Tomko in 1977. Kiniski retained his ownership stake in NWA All Star until around 1983.

Kiniski also wrestled for several months in 1970 and 1971 as a masked wrestler, "The Crimson Knight", on local TV (KPLR-TV) matches in St. Louis, Missouri. The storyline continued through numerous attempts to unmask the Knight (his mask was sewn onto his tights, making an easy removal impossible) before he was finally unmasked and revealed to be Kiniski.

=== Later career (1983–1993) ===
Kiniski remained involved in the sport for a few more years, teaming periodically with his sons, Kelly and Nick, refereeing the main event of the inaugural NWA Starrcade (Ric Flair vs. NWA World Champion Harley Race in a steel cage) in 1983, and later promoting events for Stampede Wrestling and the AWA in Vancouver while occasionally stepping into the ring.

Then Kiniski participated in a WWF Legends Battle Royal won by Lou Thesz on November 16, 1987.

His final matches as an active wrestler took place in Winnipeg's West Four Wrestling Alliance on February 25, 1992, defeating "Bulldog" Bob Brown, Bob Ryan and Randy Rudd in singles matches, teaming with Chris Jericho and Lance Storm to battle Brown, The Natural and Gerry Morrow to a no-contest in a six-man match, and being the last man eliminated by Morrow in a battle royal to fill the vacant WFWA Canadian Heavyweight Championship at a WFWA TV taping in Winnipeg.

He acted as the cornerman for Dory Funk Jr. in a match between Funk and Nick Bockwinkel (with Verne Gagne) at Slamboree 1993.

== Legacy ==
He was inducted into the Wrestling Observer Newsletter Hall of Fame in 1996, and into the Tragos/Thesz Professional Wrestling Hall of Fame in Newton, Iowa, in 2004.

In 2000, he was the interim president (commissioner) of All Japan Pro Wrestling's Pacific Wrestling Federation title governing body, but only while they searched for a permanent replacement for Lord James Blears and to present the vacant Triple Crown Heavyweight Championship to the winner of a tournament. The winner turned out to be Genichiro Tenryu; Kiniski left thereafter, and in 2001 the permanent PWF president was announced as Stan Hansen, who had competed in the tournament and lost to Tenryu in the semifinals.

== In other media ==
Kiniski went into acting on occasion, appearing in the 1978 Sylvester Stallone movie Paradise Alley, as well as Double Happiness (which also starred Sandra Oh) and the made-in-Vancouver cult film Terminal City Ricochet (with former Big Valley regular Peter Breck), playing a bit role as a policeman. On the TV side, he appeared as one of the wrestling legends interviewed on The Comedy Network series Wrestling with the Past, and he served as a commercial pitchman in several TV ads aired in the Vancouver area. He also made an appearance on an episode of the CBUT arts and entertainment magazine show Zero Avenue in 1993, discussing art with host/interviewer Christine Lippa in a Vancouver-area art gallery.

== Death ==
On April 4, 2010, Jim Ross reported on his blog that Kiniski had "taken a turn for the worse and is battling to stay alive. 'Big Thunder's' cancer has spread to his brain and some speculate that is just a matter of time [before he dies]". Kiniski died on April 14, 2010, aged 81, at his home in Blaine, Washington. A celebration of his life was held on April 25, 2010, at Kiniski's Reef in Point Roberts, where Gene often appeared at his son Nick's tavern.

== Championships and accomplishments ==
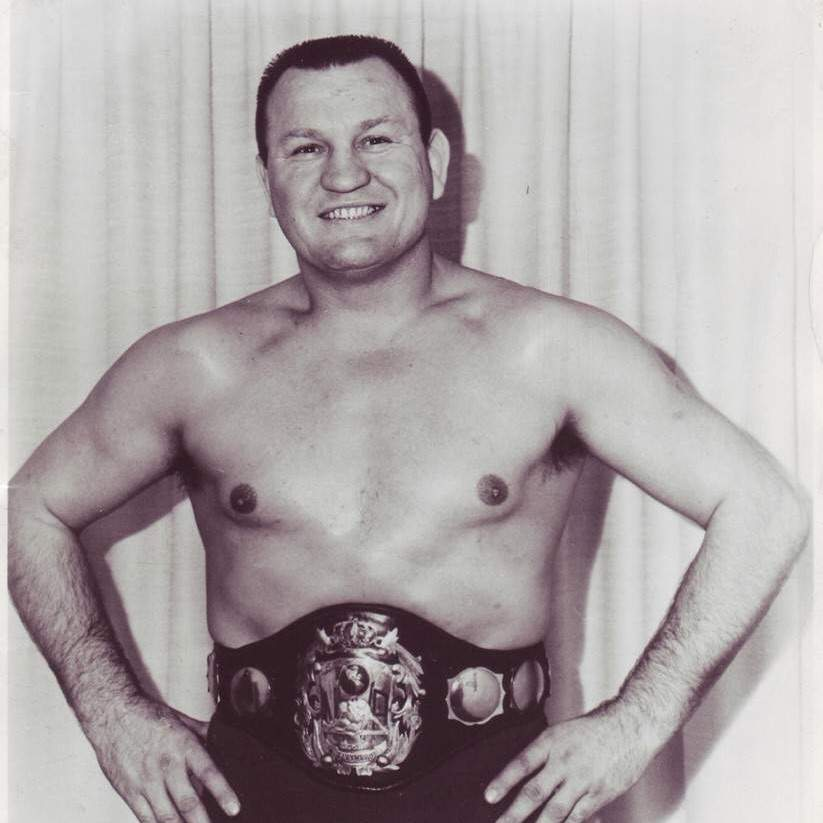
Kiniski was a one-time NWA World Heavyweight Champion

- 50th State Big Time Wrestling
  - NWA Hawaii Heavyweight Championship (2 times)
  - NWA North American Heavyweight Championship (Hawaii Version) (3 times)
  - NWA Hawaii Tag Team Championship (1 time) – with Lord James Blears
- American Wrestling Association
  - AWA United States Heavyweight Championship (4 times)
  - AWA World Heavyweight Championship (1 time)
  - AWA World Tag Team Championship (2 times) – with Hard Boiled Haggerty
- Cauliflower Alley Club
  - Other honoree (1992)
- George Tragos/Lou Thesz Professional Wrestling Hall of Fame
  - Class of 2004
- Japan Wrestling Association
  - All Asia Tag Team Championship (1 time) – with Caripus Hurricane
  - NWA International Heavyweight Championship (1 time)
- Maple Leaf Wrestling
  - NWA British Empire Heavyweight Championship (Toronto version) (2 times)
  - NWA Canadian Open Tag Team Championship (2 times) – with Fritz Von Erich (1) and Don Leo Jonathan (1)
- Montreal Athletic Commission
  - MAC International Heavyweight Championship (1 time)
- National Wrestling Alliance
  - NWA Hall of Fame (Class of 2009)
- NWA All-Star Wrestling
  - NWA British Empire Heavyweight Championship (Vancouver version) (2 times)
  - NWA Canadian Tag Team Championship (Vancouver version) (10 times) – with Mr. X (2), Don Leo Jonathan (1), Bob Brown (2), The Brute (1), Dutch Savage (1), Mr. Saito (1), Dale Lewis (1), and Siegfried Steinke (1)
  - NWA Pacific Coast Heavyweight Championship (Vancouver Version) (7 times)
  - NWA Pacific Coast Tag Team Championship (Vancouver Version) (3 times) – with Killer Kowalski (1) and Hard Boiled Haggerty (2)
- NWA Chicago
  - NWA World Tag Team Championship (Chicago Version) (1 time) – with Dick Afflis
- NWA Los Angeles
  - NWA Los Angeles International Television Tag Team Championship (1 time) – with John Tolos
- NWA San Francisco
  - NWA World Tag Team Championship (San Francisco version) (3 times) – with Lord James Blears
- NWA Western States Sports
  - NWA International Heavyweight Championship (Amarillo version) (1 time)
  - NWA World Tag Team Championship (Amarillo version) (1 time) – with Fritz Von Erich
- Professional Wrestling Hall of Fame
  - Television Era inductee to the Professional Wrestling Hall of Fame (2008)
- Southwest Sports, Inc.
  - NWA Texas Heavyweight Championship (1 time)
  - NWA Texas Tag Team Championship (1 time) – with Len Crosby
- St. Louis Wrestling Club
  - NWA Missouri Heavyweight Championship (1 time)
  - NWA World Heavyweight Championship (1 time)
- World Wrestling Association
  - WWA World Heavyweight Championship (1 time)
- World Wide Wrestling Federation
  - WWWF United States Tag Team Championship (1 time) – with Waldo Von Erich
- St. Louis Wrestling Hall of Fame
  - Class of 2007
- Wrestling Observer Newsletter
  - Wrestling Observer Newsletter Hall of Fame (Class of 1996)

== See also ==
- List of gridiron football players who became professional wrestlers
