= NWA World Tag Team Championship (Buffalo Athletic Club version) =

Professional wrestling tag team championship

Details
- Promotion: Buffalo Athletic Club
- Date established: No later than June 1956
- Date retired: 1970
Statistics
- First champions: Ben and Mike Sharpe

The Buffalo Athletic Club version of the NWA World Tag Team Championship was a regional professional wrestling championship for tag teams that existed from 1956 until 1970. The championship was promoted by National Wrestling Alliance (NWA) member the Buffalo Athletic Club under promoters Ed Don George and Bobby Bruins, whose territory covered most of northeast Ohio and portions of Western New York. Many NWA territories used a version of the NWA World Tag Team Championship as the NWA bylaws allowed each territory to use the name. In 1957 no less than 13 different NWA World Tag Team Championships were promoted across the United States.^{[Championships]} In 1970 the Buffalo Athletic Club left the NWA to form an independent wrestling promotion known as the National Wrestling Federation, at which point they replaced the NWA World Tag Team Championship with the NWF World Tag Team Championship. Like all professional wrestling championships, this version of the NWA World Tag Team Championship was not won or lost competitively but instead determined by the decision of the bookers of a wrestling promotion. The title was awarded after the chosen team "won" a match to maintain the illusion that professional wrestling is a competitive sport.

The first recognized championship team was Ben and Mike Sharpe, but records are unclear on how they became the first champions in the Ohio/New York territory. The Sharpe Brothers previously held numerous other versions of the NWA World Tag Team Championship and were a highly regarded tag team, which makes it possible that they were simply declared champions by the promoters to legitimize their version of the championship. The last championship team consisted of Johnny Powers and Great Igor, who won the championship in November 1969. The Gallagher brothers, Doc and Mike, held the championship four times, a record both for combined and individual reigns. Due to gaps in the championship history and the lack of specific dates for some of the championship reigns it is impossible to determine which team held the championship for the longest time, although the Gallagher brothers held it for at least 481 days and are thus the most likely team to have the longest combined reigns.

== Title history ==
Key

Symbol	Meaning
No.	The overall championship reign
Reign	The reign number for the specific wrestler listed.
Event	The event in which the championship changed hands
N/A	The specific information is not known
—	Used for vacated reigns in order to not count it as an official reign
[Note #]	Indicates that the exact length of the title reign is unknown, with a note providing more details.
	Indicates that there was a period where the lineage is undocumented due to the lack of written documentation in that time period.
(nlt)	Indicates that a title change took place "no later than" the date listed. (Note: Documentation of the specific date of a title change is not found but documentation of the champion holding the title on that date/in that period.)

No.	Champions	Reign	Date	Days held	Location	Event	Notes	Ref(s)
1	Ben and Mike Sharpe	1	June 1953 (NLT)	(Note: The exact date that the Sharpe Brothers won and lost the championship is uncertain which means that the reign lasted between 1 day and 31 days.)	(Note: The location of the match was not captured as part of the documentation.)	live event	Records are unclear on how the Sharpe brothers became champions	
2	Lord Athol Layton and Lord James Blears	1	July 2, 1953 (NLT)	(Note: The exact date that Layton and Blears won the championship is uncertain which means that the reign lasted between 23 days and 53 days.)		live event	Held the Chicago version at the time; Declared the local champions when the Sharps' "decline the challenge, based on news reports in a Sayre, Pennsylvania newspaper.	
3	Bill Melby and Billy Darnell	1	July 25, 1953	53	Chicago, Illinois	live event	Melby and Darnell defeated Blears and Martino Angelo, as Layton was injured.	
4	Lord Athol Layton and Lord James Blears	2	September 16, 1953	7	Menands, New York	live event		
5	Bill Melby and Billy Darnell	2	September 23, 1953	24	Menands, New York	live event		
6	Ben Sharpe and Mike Sharpe	2	October 17, 1953	(Note: The exact date that the Sharpe brothers lost the championship is uncertain which means that the reign lasted between 1 day and 51 days.)	Chicago, Illinois	live event		
7	Buddy Rogers and Great Scott	1	December 7, 1953 (NLT)	(Note: The exact date that Rogers and Gret Scott won and lost the championship is uncertain which means that the reign lasted between 1 day and 86 days.)		live event	Rogers and Scott were the MWA/American champions in Ohio. Championship listed as World Championship in the Buffalo Athletic club area late as February 6, 1954	
8	Ben Sharpe and Mike Sharpe	3	January 12, 1954 (NLT)	(Note: The exact date that the Sharpe brothers won and lost the championship is uncertain which means that the reign lasted between 1 day and 157 days.)		live event		
9	Reggie Lisowski and Art Neilson	1	May 14, 1954 (NLT)	(Note: The exact date that Lisowski and Neilson won the championship is uncertain which means that the reign lasted between 41 days and 164 days.)		live event	Lisowski and Neilson held the Chicago version at the time and were recognized in Ohio and New York as well	
10	Hans Herman and Hans Schmidt	1	June 24, 1954	(Note: The exact date that Herman and Schmidt lost the championship is uncertain which means that the reign lasted between 1 day and 21 days.)	Toledo, Ohio	live event	Lisowski and Neilson only lost the Buffalo Athletic Club version of the championship	
11	Sheik of Araby and Gypsy Joe	1	July 15, 1954 (NLT)	(Note: The exact date that Sheik and Gypsy Joe won and lost the championship is uncertain which means that the reign lasted between 1 day and 191 days.)		live event	Sheik and Gypsy Joe were the reigning Midwestern Tag Team Champions. Listed as world champions in a Marion, Ohio newspaper.	
12	Reggie Lisowski and Art Neilson	2	January 2, 1955 (NLT)	(Note: The exact date that Lisowski and Neilson won the championship is uncertain which means that the reign lasted between 53 days and 223 days.)		live event	Held the Chicago version and defended it in the Buffalo Athletic Club territory	
13	Hans Schnabel and Shoulders Newman	1	February 24, 1955	(Note: The exact date that Schnabel and Newman lost championship is uncertain which means that the reign lasted between 1 day and 233 days.)	Toledo, Ohio	live event	Lisowski and Neilson only lost the Buffalo Athletic Club version of the championship	
14	The Kalmikoffs (Ivan and Karol Kalmikoff)	1	October 15, 1957 (NLT)	(Note: The exact date that The Kalmikoffs won and lost the championship is uncertain which means that the reign lasted between 1 day and 653 days.)		live event		
15	Joe Brunetti and Guy Brunetti	1	December 10, 1958 (NLT)	(Note: The exact date that the Brunettis won and lost the championship is uncertain which means that the reign lasted between 64 days and 423 days.)		live event		
16	Doc Gallagher and Mike Gallagher	1	February 12, 1959	282	Cleveland, Ohio	live event	The championship was possibly listed as international tag team champions around Cleveland until July 1959	
17	Ilio DiPaolo and Lord Athol Layton	1	November 21, 1959	41	Akron, Ohio	live event	The Gallagher brothers still defend the world championship on other cities.	
18	Doc Gallagher and Mike Gallagher	2	January 1, 1960	83	Cleveland, Ohio	live event	The Gallaghers are recognized in the entire territory.	
19	Chris and John Tolos	1	March 24, 1960	189	Cleveland, Ohio	live event		
20	Ilio DiPaolo and Lord Athol Layton	2	September 29, 1960	(Note: The exact date that DiPaolo and Laython lost the championship is uncertain which means that the reign lasted between 1 day and 8 days.)	Cleveland, Ohio	live event		
21	Chris and John Tolos	2	October 7, 1960 (NLT)	(Note: The exact date that Chris and John Tolos won the championship is uncertain which means that the reign lasted between 10 days and 17 days.)	Canton, Ohio	live event		
22	Doc Gallagher and Mike Gallagher	3	October 17, 1960	40		Live event		
23	Duke Keomuka and Sato Keomuka	1	November 26, 1960	(Note: The exact date that the Keomuka brothers lost the championship is uncertain which means that the reign lasted between 1 day and 35 days.)	Akron, Ohio	live event	The championship change was repeated in Cleveland on December 1, 1960	
23	Johnny Barend and Magnificent Maurice	1	December 1960 (NLT)	(Note: The exact date that Barend and Magnificent Maurice won and lost the championship is uncertain which means that the reign lasted between 1 day and 100 days.)		live event		
25	Duke Keomuka and Sato Keomuka	2	March 7, 1961 (NLT)	(Note: The exact date that the Keomuka brothers won and lost the championship is uncertain which means that the reign lasted between 1 day and 451 days.)		live event	The Keomokuas were still listed as champions as in April 1961	
26	The Fabulous Kangaroos (Al Costello and Roy Heffernan)	1	February 25, 1962 (NLT)	(Note: The exact date that the Fabulous Kangaroos won and lost the championship is uncertain which means that the reign lasted between 1 day and 384 days.)		live event	The Kangaroos were also billed as champions in Pittsburgh and Chicago as well, may have been the same championship	
27	The Kalmikoffs (Ivan and Karol Kalmikoff)	2	March 27, 1962 (NLT)	(Note: The exact date that the Kalmikoffs won/lost the championship is uncertain which means that the reign lasted between 760 days and 2,407 days.)		live event	Records are unclear if this is the NWA World Tag Team Championship or not. The Kalmikoffs were still listed as champions on April 26, 1962	
28	Mitsu Arakawa and Mr. Moto	1	September 29, 1968 (NLT)	(Note: The exact date that Arakawa and Mr. Moto won and lost the championship is uncertain which means that the reign lasted at least 1 day.)	Chicago, Illinois	live event	Arakawa and Mr. Moto defeated Dick the Bruiser and The Crusher. Still billed as champions on October 10, 1968	
29	Doc Gallagher and Mike Gallagher	4	November 8, 1968 (NLT)	(Note: The exact date that the Gallagher brothers won and lost the championship is uncertain which means that the reign lasted at least 76 days.)		live event		
30	Johnny Powers and Moose Cholak	1	January 23, 1969	70	Cleveland, Ohio	live event		
31	Reginald Love and Hartford Love	1	April 3, 1969	(Note: The exact date that The Love brothers lost the championship is uncertain which means that the reign lasted between 212 days and 241 days.)	Cleveland, Ohio	live event		
32	Johnny Powers and Great Igor	1	November 1969	(Note: The exact date that the championship was abandoned is uncertain which means that the reign lasted at least 32 days.)		live event	The championship change took place between November 20 and 25, 1969	
—	Abandoned	—	1970	N/A	N/A	N/A	Replaced with the NWF World Tag Team Championship	

== Team reigns by combined length ==
Key

Symbol	Meaning
¤	The exact length of at least one title reign is uncertain, so the shortest possible length is used.

Rank	Team	No. of reigns	Combined days
1	Doc Gallagher and Mike Gallagher	4	481¤
2	Reginald Love and Hartford Love	1	212¤
3	Chris and John Tolos	2	193¤
4	Bill Melby and Billy Darnell	2	77
5	Johnny Powers and Moose Cholak	1	70
6	Joe Brunetti and Guy Brunetti	1	64¤
7	Ilio DiPaolo and Lord Athol Layton	2	42¤
8	Reggie Lisowski and Art Neilson	2	42¤
9	Johnny Powers and Great Igor	1	32¤
10	Lord Athol Layton and Lord James Blears	2	30¤
11	Ben and Mike Sharpe	3	3¤
12	Duke Keomuka and Sato Keomuka	2	2¤
12	The Kalmikoffs (Ivan and Karol Kalmikoff)	2	2¤
14	Johnny Barend and Magnificent Maurice	1	1¤
14	Hans Herman and Hans Schmidt	1	1¤
14	Hans Schnabel and Shoulders Newman	1	1¤
14	Buddy Rogers and Great Scott	1	1¤
14	Mitsu Arakawa and Mr. Moto	1	1¤
14	The Fabulous Kangaroos (Al Costello and Roy Heffernan)	1	1¤
14	Sheik of Araby and Gypsy Joe	1	1¤

== Individual reigns by combined length ==
Key

Symbol	Meaning
¤	The exact length of at least one title reign is uncertain, so the shortest possible length is used.

Rank	Wrestler	No. of reigns	Combined days
1	Doc Gallagher	4	481¤
1	Mike Gallagher	4	481¤
3	Reginald Love	1	212¤
3	Hartford Love	1	212¤
5	Chris Tolos	2	193¤
5	John Tolos	2	193¤
7	Johnny Powers	1	102¤
8	Bill Melby	2	77
8	Billy Darnell	2	77
10	Moose Cholak	1	70
11	Joe Brunetti	1	64¤
11	Guy Brunetti	1	64¤
13	Lord Athol Layton	2	42¤
13	Reggie Lisowski	2	42¤
13	Ilio DiPaolo	2	42¤
13	Art Neilson	2	42¤
17	Great Igor	1	32¤
18	Lord Athol Layton	2	30¤
18	Lord James Blears	2	30¤
20	Ben Sharpe	3	3¤
20	Mike Sharpe	3	3¤
22	Duke Keomuka	2	2¤
22	Ivan Kalmikoff	2	2¤
22	Sato Keomuka	2	2¤
22	Karol Kalmikoff	2	2¤
26	Johnny Barend	1	1¤
26	Hans Herman	1	1¤
26	Hans Schnabel	1	1¤
26	Buddy Rogers	1	1¤
26	Mitsu Arakawa	1	1¤
26	Al Costello	1	1¤
26	Sheik of Araby	1	1¤
26	Magnificent Maurice	1	1¤
26	Hans Schmidt	1	1¤
26	Shoulders Newman	1	1¤
26	Great Scott	1	1¤
26	Mr. Moto	1	1¤
26	Roy Heffernan	1	1¤
26	Gypsy Joe	1	1¤

== Concurrent championships ==
Sources for 13 simultaneous NWA World Tag Team Championships

- NWA World Tag Team Championship (Los Angeles version)
- NWA World Tag Team Championship (San Francisco version)
- NWA World Tag Team Championship (Central States version)
- NWA World Tag Team Championship (Chicago version)
- NWA World Tag Team Championship (Buffalo Athletic Club version)
- NWA World Tag Team Championship (Georgia version)
- NWA World Tag Team Championship (Iowa/Nebraska version)
- NWA World Tag Team Championship (Indianapolis version)
- NWA World Tag Team Championship (Salt Lake Wrestling Club version)
- NWA World Tag Team Championship (Amarillo version)
- NWA World Tag Team Championship (Minneapolis version)
- NWA World Tag Team Championship (Texas version)
- NWA World Tag Team Championship (Mid-America version)
