= Spike Huber =

American professional wrestler (born 1955)

Personal information
- Born: Michael Huber; December 17, 1955 (age 70) Indianapolis, Indiana, U.S.

Professional wrestling career
- Ring name(s): Spike Huber; Mike Huber
- Billed height: 6 ft 0 in (1.83 m)
- Billed weight: 235 lb (107 kg)
- Debut: 1974
- Retired: 2000

Michael Huber (born December 17, 1955) is a retired American professional wrestler better known by his ring name Spike Huber. He wrestled in Indianapolis for the World Wrestling Association, American Wrestling Association, St. Louis Wrestling Club, and Continental Wrestling Association.

== Professional wrestling career ==
Huber made his pro wrestling debut in 1974 in Indianapolis. For many years he worked for the World Wrestling Association. He also worked years in Minnesota for the American Wrestling Association and in St. Louis.

In 1979, he teamed with his father-in-law Dick the Bruiser to win the WWA World Tag Team Championship defeating Roger Kirby and Paul Christy. He would win the titles four more times with Wilbur Snyder and Steve Regal from 1980 to 1983.

In 1980 he made his only tour in Japan for International Wrestling Enterprise.

From 1982 to 1984, Huber worked in Memphis for Continental Wrestling Association where he continued teaming with Steve Regal.

His biggest accomplishment was when he won the WWA World Heavyweight Championship (Indianapolis) on January 7, 1984, when he defeated Bobby Colt.

In 1984, he worked for the World Wrestling Federation.

In the early 1990s, he worked for United States Wrestling Association. Then retired from wrestling in 2000.

== Championships and accomplishments ==
- Southern Illinois Championship Wrestling
  - Illinois Heavyweight Championship (1 time)
- St. Louis Wrestling Hall of Fame

- Class of 2026

- World Wrestling Association
  - WWA World Heavyweight Championship (1 time)
  - WWA World Tag Team Championship (5 times) – with Dick the Bruiser (1), Wilbur Snyder (2) and Steve Regal (2)
