= NWA British Empire Heavyweight Championship =

NWA British Empire Heavyweight Championship may refer to:

- NWA British Empire Heavyweight Championship (Toronto version)
- NWA British Empire Heavyweight Championship (Vancouver version)

== See also ==
- NWA British Empire/Commonwealth Championship (New Zealand version)
