= World Heavyweight Championship (Omaha) =

Professional wrestling championship

Details
- Promotion: National Wrestling Alliance (Nebraska)
- Date established: June 14, 1957
- Date retired: September 7, 1963
Statistics
- First champion: Édouard Carpentier
- Most reigns: Verne Gagne (5 times)
- Longest reign: Verne Gagne (465 days)
- Shortest reign: Verne Gagne (1 second)

The World Heavyweight Championship was a professional wrestling world heavyweight championship sanctioned by a group of National Wrestling Alliance (NWA) promoters led by the NWA affiliate in Omaha, Nebraska, United States. These promoters chose to recognize Édouard Carpentier as NWA World Heavyweight Champion following his disputed win over NWA World Heavyweight Champion Lou Thesz on June 14, 1957. The majority of NWA promoters continued to recognize Thesz as their champion.

It was often contested alongside the AWA World Heavyweight Championship, and the two titles were finally unified when AWA champion Verne Gagne defeated Omaha champion Fritz Von Erich on September 7, 1963.

== Title history ==
Key
No.	Overall reign number
Reign	Reign number for the specific champion
Days	Number of days held

No.	Champion	Championship change			Reign statistics		Notes	Ref.
No.	Champion	Date	Event	Location	Reign	Days	Notes	Ref.
1	Édouard Carpentier	June 14, 1957	House show	Chicago, Illinois	1	421	Recognized as champion after a disputed win over NWA World Heavyweight Champion Lou Thesz. The majority of the NWA promotions continue to recognize Thesz as their champion.	
2	Verne Gagne	August 9, 1958	House show	Omaha, Nebraska	1	98		
3	Wilbur Snyder	November 15, 1958	House show	Omaha, Nebraska	1	189		
4	Dick the Bruiser	May 23, 1959	House show	Detroit, MI	1	63	This match was also for the Fred Kohler Chicago version of the NWA United States Championship.	
5	Wilbur Snyder	July 25, 1959	House show	Omaha, Nebraska	2	70		
6	Dr. X	October 3, 1959	House show	Omaha, Nebraska	1	96		
7	Don Leo Jonathan	January 7, 1960	House show	Omaha, Nebraska	1	394		
8	Dr. X	February 4, 1961	House show	Omaha, Nebraska	2	58		
9	Don Leo Jonathan	April 3, 1961	House show	Omaha, Nebraska	2	17		
—	Vacated	April 20, 1961	—	—	—	—	Vacant after a disqualification loss to Bobo Brazil.	
10	Don Leo Jonathan	May 20, 1961	House show	Omaha, Nebraska	3	119	Defeated Bobo Brazil in a lumberjack match to win the vacant title.	
11	Verne Gagne	September 16, 1961	House show	Omaha, Nebraska	2	318		
12	Fritz Von Erich	July 31, 1962	House show	Omaha, Nebraska	1	25		
13	Verne Gagne	August 25, 1962	House show	Omaha, Nebraska	3	174		
14	The Crusher	February 15, 1963	House show	Omaha, Nebraska	1	155	Also won the AWA World Heavyweight Championship from Verne Gagne on July 9, 1963 in Minneapolis, Minnesota	
15	Verne Gagne	July 20, 1963	House show	Minneapolis, Minnesota	4	7	Won both the Omaha title and AWA title.	
16	Fritz Von Erich	July 27, 1963	House show	Omaha, Nebraska	2	42	Won both the Omaha title and AWA title.	
17	Verne Gagne	September 7, 1963	House show	Omaha, Nebraska	5	0	Won the AWA title from Fritz Von Erich on August 8, 1963 in Amarillo, Texas.	
—	Unified	September 7, 1963	—	—	—	—	The Omaha title was unified with the AWA title.	

== See also ==
- List of early world heavyweight champions in professional wrestling
