= Lord Athol Layton =

British-Australian professional wrestler (1919-1984)

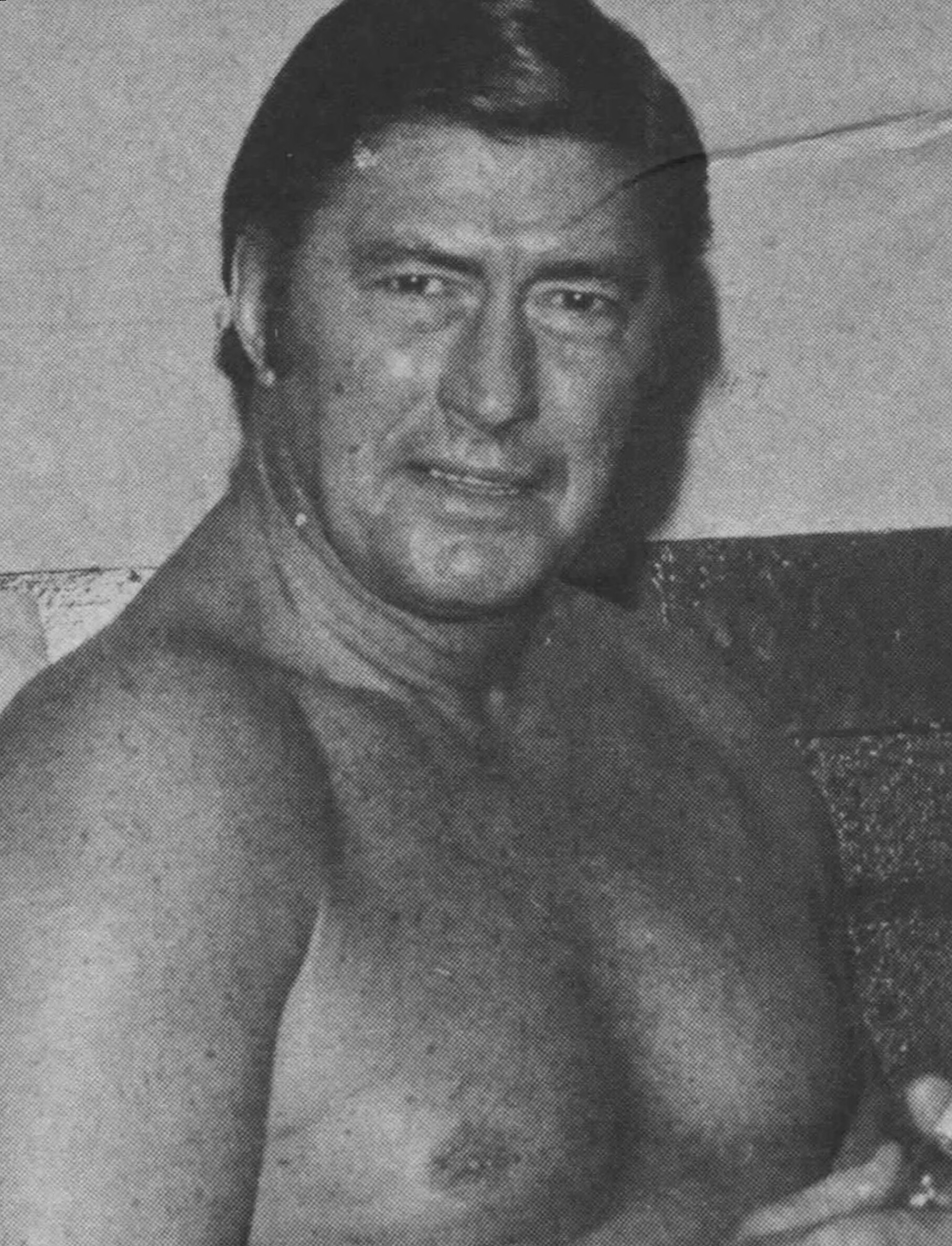

Personal information
- Born: Allan Layton; 20 August 1919 Surrey, England
- Died: 18 January 1984 (aged 62) Mississauga, Ontario, Canada
- Spouse: Leah Layton

Professional wrestling career
- Ring name: Lord Athol Layton
- Billed height: 6 ft 5 in (1.96 m)
- Billed weight: 260 lb (118 kg)
- Billed from: England
- Debut: 1949
- Retired: 1976

Allan Layton (20 August 1919 – 18 January 1984) known by his ring name Lord Athol Layton, was an English-Australian professional wrestler, amateur boxer, and professional wrestling commentator, best remembered as being a major wrestling attraction in the 1950s and 1960s as both a tag-team and singles wrestler. As a tag team performer, he formed a memorable team with Lord James Blears, with whom he won various championships throughout the United States and Canada. As a singles wrestler, he drew large crowds particularly in Toronto against Billy Watson and The Sheik and in Detroit against Dick the Bruiser. He also appeared as a longtime color commentator for wrestling television shows in the Ontario, New York, Ohio and Michigan territories.

== Early life ==
Born in the county of Surrey in England, Layton moved with his family to Australia at the age of 13. He served in the Australian Imperial Forces during World War II, where he was Australia's Heavyweight Amateur Boxing champion for two years. At some point prior to his service, he met his wife Leah, with whom he settled down to run a pub with after his discharge from military services.

== Professional wrestling career ==
Layton became interested in a career in professional wrestling after seeing a wrestling show visiting his town. Through a friend, with little experience or training, he had his first wrestling match in Singapore in 1949. Shortly thereafter, Layton went back to England to hone his craft in professional wrestling. After this training, he arrived in Toronto and began wrestling full-time for promoter Frank Tunney's Toronto, Canada-based 'Maple Leaf' territory. He would make his Maple Leaf Gardens debut in November 1950, in the main event bout against Ski Hi Lee.

A heel in the early part of his career, Layton would develop into a babyface. In 1953, he faced Lou Thesz for the NWA World Heavyweight Championship at Maple Leaf Gardens.

In 1952, he formed a tag team with Lord James Blears. Managed by Captain Leslie Holmes, in 1953 they won the NWA World Tag Team Championship (Chicago version) in NWA Chicago. They would go on to capture many tag team championships in various territories throughout the United States and Canada including the Ohio-New York version of the NWA World Tag Team Championship on two occasions. Layton would also win tag team championships with Bobo Brazil in August 1970 in Detroit and Ilio DiPaolo in November 1959 for the Midwest Wrestling Association.

In Detroit in August 1962, as a fan favorite, Layton beat Dick the Bruiser for the United States Heavyweight Championship. He went on to win the title again in 1963. Owing to concerns over an eye injury, Layton wrestled his final match in 1976 at Maple Leaf Gardens, teaming with Lou Klein in a tag-team match against the Kelly Twins

As early as June 1961 Layton was working as a television commentator for the Tunney promotion for the live TV wrestling show on CBLT Toronto and later at CHCH in Hamilton, Ontario. He excelled in this position and worked for Ed Farhat in Detroit on WXON as well. He also performed as a color commentator in various territories including Cleveland and Toronto. In addition to his other M/C positions his show also appeared on a Windsor Ontario station CKLW across from Detroit, Michigan, where he grappled physically with the likes of The Sheik & Dick The Bruiser. Fans also didn't know that he worked for Ed Farhat AKA The Sheik.

== Personal life ==
Throughout his career, Layton was a regular volunteer, working on behalf of disabled and underprivileged children. He was awarded the Ontario Medal for Good Citizenship in 1983 for his charitable work, one year before his passing.

He gained Canadian citizenship in 1958.

Athol Layton died at the age of 62 on 18 January 1984, at his home in Mississauga, Ontario as the result of a massive heart attack, myocardial infarction.

== Championships and accomplishments ==
=== Amateur Boxing ===
Heavyweight Amateur Boxing Champion (Australia), two years during the Second World War period

=== Professional wrestling ===
- Big Time Wrestling (Detroit)
  - NWA United States Heavyweight Championship (Detroit version) (2 times)
  - NWA World Tag Team Championship (Detroit version) (1 time) - with Bobo Brazil
- National Wrestling Alliance
  - NWA World Tag Team championship (Chicago/Indianapolis version) (1 time) - with Lord James Blears
  - NWA World Tag Team championship (Ohio-New York version) (4 times) - Lord James Blears (2) and Ilio DiPaolo (2)
  - NWA Canadian Open Tag Team championship (Toronto version) (1 time) - with Billy Watson
  - NWA Hawaii Tag Team championship (1 time) - Tom Rice
  - NWA (San Francisco) Pacific Coast Tag Team championship (2 times) - with James Blears
- Midwest Wrestling Association
  - MWA Ohio Tag Team championship (1 time) - with Ilio DiPaolo
- Worldwide Wrestling Associates
  - WWA International Television Tag Team Championship (2 times) - James Blears
- American Wrestling Association
  - AWA United States Heavyweight championship (Detroit version) (2 times)
