= NWA United States Heavyweight Championship (Detroit version) =

Former wrestling competition

Details
- Promotion: Fred Kohler Enterprises; Big Time Wrestling
- Date established: September 3, 1953
- Date retired: October, 1980

Other name
- NWA United States Heavyweight Championship (Chicago version)
Statistics
- First champion: Verne Gagne
- Final champion: The Sheik
- Most reigns: The Sheik (12 reigns)
- Longest reign: The Sheik (538 days)
- Shortest reign: Pampero Firpo & Bobo Brazil (7 days)
- Oldest champion: The Sheik (53 years, 298 days)
- Youngest champion: Gino Hernandez (19 years, 147 days)
- Heaviest champion: Abdullah the Butcher (430 lb (200 kg; 31 st))
- Lightest champion: Verne Gagne (215 lb (98 kg; 15.4 st))

The NWA Detroit United States Heavyweight Championship was a version of the NWA United States Heavyweight Championship contested in Big Time Wrestling from 1959 until 1980. It was first introduced as the Chicago version of the championship and contested on shows produced by Fred Kohler Enterprises before moving to Big Time Wrestling in Detroit six years later. While the National Wrestling Alliance recognized only one World Heavyweight Championship, there were multiple NWA United States Heavyweight Championships, as many NWA-affiliated promotions across the U.S. each had its own version of an "American" or "United States" championship. For most such territories—including Detroit—the U.S. Championship was the promotion's primary singles championship. Over its history, the title was held by stars including Bobo Brazil, The Sheik, Wilbur Snyder, Johnny Valentine, and multi-time AWA World Heavyweight Champions Verne Gagne and Dick the Bruiser.

== Title history ==
Wrestler:	Times:	Date:	Location:	Notes:
NWA United States Heavyweight Championship (Chicago version)
Verne Gagne	1	September 3, 1953	Chicago, IL	Gagne was awarded the title.
Wilbur Snyder	1	April 7, 1956	Chicago, IL	
Hans Schmidt	1	October 19, 1956	Chicago, IL	
Wilbur Snyder	2	February 19, 1957	Chicago, IL	
Dick the Bruiser	1	December 14, 1957	Chicago, IL	
Verne Gagne	2	April 12, 1958	Chicago, IL	During this reign, Gagne creates his own splinter of the championship, later renaming it to the AWA United States Heavyweight Championship.
Wilbur Snyder	3	November 15, 1958	Chicago, IL	
Angelo Poffo	1	December 27, 1958	Cincinnati, OH	
Renamed NWA United States Heavyweight Championship (Detroit version)
Wilbur Snyder	4	May 2, 1959	Detroit, MI	
Dick the Bruiser	2	May 23, 1959	Detroit, MI	
Bob Ellis	1	June 2, 1960	Windsor, Ontario	
Dick the Bruiser	3	June 11, 1960	Detroit, MI	
Bobo Brazil	1	January 28, 1961	Detroit, MI	
Dick the Bruiser	4	February 28, 1961	Detroit, MI	
Fritz Von Erich	1	December 1, 1961	Detroit, MI	
Wilbur Snyder	5	1962	?	
Dick the Bruiser	5	June 2, 1962	Detroit, MI	
Lord Athol Layton	1	August 4, 1962	?	
Fritz Von Erich	2	June 9, 1963	Detroit, MI	
Lord Athol Layton	2	July 20, 1963	Detroit, MI	
Fritz Von Erich	3	October 19, 1963	Detroit, MI	
Johnny Valentine	1	June 13, 1964	Detroit, MI	
The Sheik	1	February 6, 1965	Detroit, MI	
Bobo Brazil	2	August 1967	?	
The Sheik	2	October 1967	?	
Bobo Brazil	3	July 29, 1971	Detroit, MI	
Pampero Firpo	1	August 12, 1972	Detroit, MI	
Bobo Brazil	4	August 19, 1972	Detroit, MI	
Pampero Firpo	2	October 28, 1972	Detroit, MI	
Bobo Brazil	5	December 23, 1972	Detroit, MI	
The Sheik	3	December 30, 1972	Detroit, MI	
Bobo Brazil	6	January 13, 1973	Detroit, MI	
The Sheik	4	January 27, 1973	Detroit, MI	
Johnny Valentine	2	July 7, 1973	Detroit, MI	
The Sheik	5	July 21, 1973	Detroit, MI	
Johnny Valentine	3	1973	?	
The Sheik	6	September 1973	?	
Tony Marino	1	March 2, 1974	Detroit, MI	
The Sheik	7	March 16, 1974	Detroit, MI	
Bobo Brazil	7	January 25, 1975	Detroit, MI	Awarded after Sheik no-shows multiple title defenses.
Abdullah the Butcher	1	February 8, 1975	Detroit, MI	
Bobo Brazil	8	April 19, 1975	Detroit, MI	
The Sheik	8	July 5, 1975	Detroit, MI	
Mark Lewin	1	September 27, 1975	Detroit, MI	
"Bulldog" Don Kent	1	November 1, 1975	Detroit, MI	
Mark Lewin	2	December 1975	?	
Vacated		February 14, 1976		Title declared vacant for unknown reasons.
Bobo Brazil	9	April 21, 1976		Brazil was awarded the championship when Brute Bernard was unable to compete in a tournament final due to injury.
The Sheik	9	May 15, 1976	Detroit, MI	
Pampero Firpo	3	July 17, 1976	Detroit, MI	
Don Kent	2	October 16, 1976	Detroit, MI	
Gino Hernandez	1	January 8, 1977	Detroit, MI	
The Sheik	10	April 2, 1977	Detroit, MI	
Ox Baker	1	September 1977	Detroit, MI	
The Sheik	11	between 1977 & 1980	?	
Mighty Igor	1	between 1977 & 1980	?	
The Sheik	12	May 3, 1980	Detroit, MI	
Title Retired		October 1980		Promotion closes; Sheik takes the belt to International Championship Wrestling (ICW), where it is used as the ICW United States Heavyweight Championship. The Sheik would later claim a splinter version of the Detroit championship in Tri-State Wrestling Alliance in 1991.

== See also ==
- National Wrestling Alliance
