= Fred Kohler Enterprises =

Professional wrestling promotion, active from 1925 until 1965

- Founded: 1925
- Defunct: November 1965
- Headquarters: Chicago, Illinois, United States
- Founder: Fred Kohler
- Owner: Fred Kohler
- Formerly: International Wrestling Association; NWA Chicago

Fred Kohler Enterprises, Inc. was a company established by businessman Fred Kohler (1903–1969) to promote professional wrestling in Chicago, Illinois, in the United States.

Kohler began promoting in 1925, and by 1942 he dominated professional wrestling in Chicago. He joined the recently founded National Wrestling Alliance in 1949, with his promotion sometimes thereafter referred to as NWA Chicago. From 1949 to 1955, Fred Kohler Enterprises was one of the most profitable and high-profile promotions in the United States due to the success of Wrestling from Marigold, a program airing on the DuMont national television network. A slump in business in the late-1950s was reversed by a partnership with the Capitol Wrestling Corporation, and in 1961 Fred Kohler Enterprises drew the then-largest crowd in professional wrestling history to watch a World Heavyweight Championship bout between Buddy Rogers and Pat O'Connor at Chicago's Comiskey Park. Kohler's often-fractious relationship with the NWA came to an end in 1963 when he withdrew to form the International Wrestling Association, a would-be competitor. The company was dissolved in 1965, marking the end of Fred Kohler Enterprises after 40 years.

== History ==
=== Early years (1925–1946) ===
Fred Koch was born in Chicago in 1903. He attended Lane Technical College Prep High School, where he competed in amateur wrestling, placing second in his weight category in a 1928 Amateur Athletic Union tournament. After graduating, he became a professional wrestler to supplement his income while working as a physical director and then as a machinist. He was given the ring name "Fred Kohler" by a promoter and went on to use this name throughout his professional wrestling and promoting careers.

Kohler began promoting in 1925, staging his first event in a hall owned by his father. By the mid-1930s, he had built a fan base and was generating a steady profit. In November 1936, Kohler promoted a bout between Ali Baba and Everett Marshall for Marshall's World Heavyweight Championship. Held at the Chicago Stadium, the match attracted an audience of 9,736, establishing Kohler as a major figure in Chicago's professional wrestling scene. The success of the Chicago Stadium event gave Kohler enough cache to negotiate an alliance with promoter Ed White, and in 1937 the duo began promoting shows together. After White retired in 1942, Kohler was firmly positioned as the most powerful figure in professional wrestling in Chicago.

In 1944, Kohler began recognizing mainstay Walter Palmer as World Heavyweight Champion.

=== Television era (1946–1955) ===
Kohler's first television program, Wrestling From Rainbo Arena, began airing on Wednesday evenings on July 10, 1946, on the regional television network WBKB. Hosted by Russ Davis, the program featured matches recorded in Chicago's Rainbo Arena. In 1948, Wrestling from Marigold began airing on the regional network WGN.

In 1949, Kohler secured new television deals with ABC and WJZ-TV. Later that year, he reached a deal with the recently founded national television network DuMont. Wrestling from Marigold began airing on Thursdays and Saturdays in September 1949. The program was inexpensive to produce, and Kohler's membership of the NWA gave him access to some of the country's best performers. Wrestling from Marigold quickly became popular, with both broadcasts ranking amongst the top DuMont programs.

In September 1949, Kohler enrolled in the National Wrestling Alliance, which had been founded the prior year. The World Heavyweight Championship (Chicago version) was abandoned, with Chief Don Eagle as the final champion

In 1950, Kohler was involved in a notorious "double-cross" when he instructed Gorgeous George to shoot on Chief Don Eagle and legitimately pin him to win the American Wrestling Association World Heavyweight Championship, which was being defended in a bout in Chicago. The plan was concocted to weaken the AWA and rival promoter Al Haft, who booked Eagle.

Kohler resigned from the NWA in December 1950 in protest at its failure to take action when Leonard Schwartz, Al Haft, Toots Mondt, and Paul Bowser began competing with him in Chicago. He rejoined in February 1951 after NWA president Sam Muchnick brokered a compromise.

The success of Wrestling from Marigold made Kohler one of the most powerful figures in professional wrestling. Kohler became one of the first promoters in the United States to sign his wrestlers to exclusive contracts, earning a commission from hiring them out to other territories. Kohler made extensive use of merchandising, selling calendars and photos. In 1954, he secured exclusive rights to the sale of "Wrestling Polka", a record composed by Helen Carroll and the Satisfiers as the theme for Wrestling from Marigold. His annual revenue rose to over $100,000 (equivalent to $1,171,000 in 2024) per annum. By the early-1950s, Kohler's top star, Verne Gagne, was the most popular professional wrestler in the United States.

In 1953, Kohler decided to create a regional championship to feature on Wrestling from Marigold. In September 1953, the NWA United States Heavyweight Championship (Chicago version) was awarded to Gagne. This resulted in tension with some NWA officials, who felt that it undermined the status of Lou Thesz, the-then holder of the NWA World Heavyweight Championship, the world championship recognized by all NWA members. Thesz himself refused to wrestle in Chicago. Gagne held the championship until April 1956. In later years, many other NWA territories created their own regional NWA United States Heavyweight Championships. Potentially due to the dispute, a highly anticipated NWA World Heavyweight Championship match between Gagne and Thesz never took place.

Jim Barnett joined Kohler as an assistant in the mid-1950s. In 1955, Barnett came up with the idea of recording professional wrestling programs in a television studio rather than transporting recording equipment to arenas as was usually done.

In 1955, Kohler began attempting to expand his territory, promoting shows in locations including Albuquerque, New Mexico; Denver, Colorado; Las Vegas, Nevada; and Los Angeles, California. He raised the ire of NWA president Sam Muchnick by promoting shows in Indianapolis, Indiana, until then traditionally the territory of Muchnick's own promotion, the St. Louis Wrestling Club.

=== Late years (1955–1964) ===
DuMont abruptly cancelled Wrestling from Marigold in March 1955, a move that saw Fred Kohler Enterprises' annual revenue drop by $50,000 (equivalent to $587,000 in 2024). The blow was compounded in May 1957 when WGN also cancelled Wrestling from Marigold.

By the late-1950s Fred Kohler Enterprises was close to bankruptcy. In 1959, promoter Eddie Quinn began running shows in opposition to Fred Kohler Enterprises in Chicago. Kohler responded by forming a partnership with Vincent J. McMahon, promoter of the Capital Wrestling Corporation. The partnership gave Kohler access to new wrestlers including Bearcat Wright, Buddy Rogers, and Johnny Valentine. Kohler also used purchased time on Heavyweight Wrestling from Bridgeport, a Capital Wrestling Corporation's program that aired on the regional network WNBQ, to advertise his shows in Chicago. By 1960, the promotion had rebounded and the threat posed by Quinn had receded.

In June 1961, Fred Kohler Enterprises and the Capital Wrestling Corporation jointly promoted a show at Comiskey Park headlined by a bout that saw Buddy Rogers defeat Pat O'Connor for the NWA World Heavyweight Championship. The event was attended by 38,622 people, the then-highest ever attendance of any professional wrestling event in history and a record that stood until the 1st Von Erich Memorial Parade of Champions in 1984.

Kohler was elected president of the NWA in August 1961. In November 1961, Kohler unsuccessfully moved for the NWA board of directors to vote on dissolving the organisation His presidency ended the following year.

In 1963, Kohler withdrew from the NWA once more, renaming his promotion the "International Wrestling Association". The IWA positioned itself as a competitor to the NWA but lasted only a year. Fred Kohler Enterprises went into receivership in August 1964 with its assets sold at auction, marking the end of Kohler's promoting career. The territory was taken over by Dick the Bruiser and Wilbur Snyder, the owners of the World Wrestling Association, who purchased the remaining assets of Fred Kohler Enterprises from Kohler in November 1965.

== Championships ==
Championship	Created	Abandoned	Notes
NWA United States Heavyweight Championship (Chicago version)	1953	1964	The Chicago version of the NWA United States Heavyweight Championship was created in 1953 when Verne Gagne was awarded the championship. In 1963, when NWA Chicago withdrew from the NWA and became the International Wrestling Alliance, the championship was renamed the IWA United States Heavyweight Championship. The championship was abandoned in 1964 when the IWA ceased trading.
NWA World Tag Team Championship (Chicago version)	1953	1960	The Chicago version of the NWA World Tag Team Championship was created in 1953 when Lord Athol Layton and Lord James Blears were awarded the championship. The championship was abandoned in 1960.
World Heavyweight Championship (Illinois version)	1944	1949	This championship was created in 1944 when Walter Palmer was credited as having won a tournament. The championship stemmed from the National Wrestling Association's World Heavyweight Championship. It was also known as the Midwest Championship or Illinois Championship. The championship was abandoned in 1949 when Fred Kohler joined the National Wrestling Alliance and began recognizing the NWA World Heavyweight Championship.

== Alumni ==
- Freddie Blassie
- Lord James Blears
- Bobo Brazil
- Mike DiBiase
- Dick the Bruiser
- Pat O'Connor
- Chief Don Eagle
- Dory Funk
- Verne Gagne
- Gorgeous George
- Don Leo Jonathan
- Lord Athol Layton
- Reggie Lisowski
- Bronko Nagurski
- Angelo Poffo
- Antonino Rocca
- Buddy Rogers
- Bruno Sammartino
- Hans Schmidt
- Sweet Daddy Siki
- Wilbur Snyder
- Johnny Valentine
- Bearcat Wright
