= NWA Missouri Heavyweight Championship =

Professional wrestling championship

Details
- Promotion: Central States Wrestling and St. Louis Wrestling Club (through 1986)
- Date established: October – December 1899 (original); September 16, 1972 (current)

Other name
- Missouri Heavyweight Championship
Statistics
- First champion: George Baptiste
- Most reigns: Harley Race (7)

The NWA Missouri Heavyweight Championship was a singles championship in the National Wrestling Alliance's St. Louis Wrestling Club and Central States Wrestling promotions in the 1970s and 1980s. It was considered a "stepping stone" to the NWA World Heavyweight Championship (although only Race, Terry Funk and Kerry Von Erich made it; Gene Kiniski, Dory Funk, Jr.,Jack Brisco and Ric Flair were already former World Champions upon winning the Missouri title). A version of the Missouri Championship has been documented to exist in 1899, 1921, 1933 to 1934, 1937, 1947, 1950, and 1954 to 1955, but it was only in 1972 that a serious championship was established. Prior to the creation of the NWA the championship was not recognized outside of the region and used by regional promoters, it is even possible that competing Missouri Heavyweight Championships existed. The championship was abandoned in 1986, as the Central States promotion was being consolidated under Jim Crockett Promotions in order to counter the World Wrestling Federation's national expansion. The title was revived in 2003.

== Pre National Wrestling Alliance Title history ==
Key
No.	Overall reign number
Reign	Reign number for the specific champion
Days	Number of days held

No.	Champion	Championship change			Reign statistics		Notes	Ref.
No.	Champion	Date	Event	Location	Reign	Days	Notes	Ref.
1	George Baptiste	October 1899 (NLT)	Missouri show	(Note: The location of the match was not captured as part of the championship documentation.)	1	(Note: The date the championship was won and later lost has not been documented which means the championship reign lasted more than 1 day but it is impossible to say how long exactly.)	Records are unclear as to whom he defeated.	
Championship history is unrecorded from October 1899 (NLT) to 1921.
2	Jake Reed	1921	Missouri show		1	(Note: The date the championship was won and later lost has not been documented which means the championship reign lasted more than 1 day but it is impossible to say how long exactly.)	Defeated Lloyd Carter to win the championship. Unclear if Carter was the champion or if this was a tournament final.	
Championship history is unrecorded from 1921 to March 6, 1930.
3	Jake Ross	March 6, 1930	Missouri show	Chillicothe, Missouri	1	705	Defeated Charles Santen to win the championship, unclear if Santen was the champion or if this was a tournament final.	
4	Fred Peterson	February 9, 1932	Missouri show		1	(Note: The date the championship was won has not been documented which means the championship reign lasted anywhere between 21 days and 51 days)		
5	Billy Wolf	March 1934	Missouri show		1	(Note: The date the championship was won has not been documented which means the championship reign lasted anywhere between 751 days and 781 days)		
6	Lou Thesz	June 18, 1937	Missouri show	Kansas City, Missouri	1	(Note: The date the championship was vacated has not been documented which means the championship reign lasted more than 1 day but it is impossible to say how much more.)	Defeated Warren Bockwinkel to win the championship	
—	Deactivated	N/A	—	—	—	—	Uncertain when the championship was abandoned	

== National Wrestling Alliance Title history ==
Key
No.	Overall reign number
Reign	Reign number for the specific champion
Days	Number of days held

No.	Champion	Championship change			Reign statistics		Notes	Ref.
No.	Champion	Date	Event	Location	Reign	Days	Notes	Ref.
1	Tommy O'Toole	March 10, 1950	CSW/SLWC show	St. Joseph, Missouri	1	35	Defeated Sonny Myers in a 10-man tournament final.	
2	Sonny Myers	April 14, 1950	CSW/SLWC show	St. Joseph, Missouri	1	273		
3	Ron Etchison	January 12, 1951	CSW/SLWC show	St. Joseph, Missouri	1	14		
4	Sonny Myers	January 26, 1951	CSW/SLWC show	St. Joseph, Missouri	2	7		
5	Ron Etchison	February 2, 1951	CSW/SLWC show	St. Joseph, Missouri	2	7		
6	Ray Eckert	February 9, 1951	CSW/SLWC show	St. Joseph, Missouri	1	20		
6	Ron Etchison	March 1, 1951	CSW/SLWC show	St. Joseph, Missouri	3	99		
—	Vacated	June 8, 1951	—	—	—	—	Championship vacated, reason undocumented	
8	Sonny Myers	February 1, 1952	CSW/SLWC show		3	14		
9	Joe Dusek	February 15, 1952	CSW/SLWC show	St. Joseph, Missouri	1	273		
10	Sonny Myers	November 14, 1952	CSW/SLWC show		4	42		
11	Ron Etchison	December 26, 1952	CSW/SLWC show	St. Joseph, Missouri	4	155		
—	Vacated	May 30, 1953	—	—	—	—	Championship vacated, no reason documented	
12	Sonny Myers	December 18, 1953	CSW/SLWC show		5	14		
13	Bob Orton	January 1, 1954	CSW/SLWC show	St. Joseph, Missouri	1	63		
14	Ray Eckert	March 5, 1954	CSW/SLWC show	St. Joseph, Missouri	2	33		
—	Vacated	April 7, 1954	—	—	—	—	Championship held up due to a controversial ending of a match against Sonny Myers	
15	Sonny Myers	April 9, 1954	CSW/SLWC show	St. Joseph, Missouri	6	43	Defeated Ray Eckert to win the vacant championship.	
16	Larry Hamilton	May 22, 1954	CSW/SLWC show	St. Joseph, Missouri	1	167		
17	Ron Etchison	November 5, 1954	CSW/SLWC show	St. Joseph, Missouri	5	308		
—	Vacated	September 9, 1955	—	—	—	—	Championship vacated, reason not documented	
18	Joe Dusek	April 1956	CSW/SLWC show	Sedalia, Missouri	2	(Note: The date the championship was won has not been documented which means the championship reign lasted anywhere between 142 days and 171 days)		
—	Vacated	September 19, 1956	—	—	—	—	Championship inactive.	
19	Harley Race	September 16, 1972	Wrestling at the Chase	St. Louis, Missouri	1	91	Defeated Pak Song in a tournament final for the revived championship.	
—	Vacated	December 16, 1972	—	—	—	—	Championship held up after a match against Johnny Valentine	
20	Johnny Valentine	January 19, 1973	CSW/SLWC show	St. Louis, Missouri	1	22	Defeated Harley Race in a rematch.	
21	Terry Funk	February 10, 1973	Wrestling at the Chase	St. Louis, Missouri	1	34		
22	Gene Kiniski	March 16, 1973	CSW/SLWC show	St. Louis, Missouri	1	211		
23	Harley Race	October 13, 1973	Wrestling at the Chase	St. Louis, Missouri	2	223		
24	Dory Funk, Jr.	May 24, 1974	CSW/SLWC show	St. Louis, Missouri	1	273		
25	Harley Race	February 21, 1975	CSW/SLWC show	St. Louis, Missouri	3	427		
26	Bob Backlund	April 23, 1976	CSW/SLWC show	St. Louis, Missouri	1	217		
27	Jack Brisco	November 26, 1976	CSW/SLWC show	St. Louis, Missouri	1	259		
28	Dick Slater	August 12, 1977	CSW/SLWC show	St. Louis, Missouri	1	184		
29	Ted DiBiase	February 12, 1978	Wrestling at the Chase	St. Louis, Missouri	1	14		
30	Dick Murdoch	February 26, 1978	Wrestling at the Chase	St. Louis, Missouri	1	138		
31	Dick the Bruiser	July 14, 1978	Wrestling at the Chase	St. Louis, Missouri	1	246		
32	Dick Murdoch	March 18, 1979	Wrestling at the Chase	St. Louis, Missouri	2	61		
33	Dick the Bruiser	May 18, 1979	CSW/SLWC show	St. Louis, Missouri	2	56		
34	Dick Murdoch	July 13, 1979	CSW/SLWC show	St. Louis, Missouri	3	133		
35	Kevin Von Erich	November 23, 1979	CSW/SLWC show	St. Louis, Missouri	1	154		
36	Ken Patera	April 25, 1980	CSW/SLWC show	St. Louis, Missouri	1	210		
37	Ted DiBiase	November 21, 1980	Wrestling at the Chase	St. Louis, Missouri	2	315		
38	Jack Brisco	October 2, 1981	CSW/SLWC show	St. Louis, Missouri	2	21		
39	Ken Patera	October 23, 1981	CSW/SLWC show	St. Louis, Missouri	2	70		
40	Dick the Bruiser	January 1, 1982	CSW/SLWC show	St. Louis, Missouri	3	259		
41	Harley Race	September 17, 1982	CSW/SLWC show	St. Louis, Missouri	4	128		
42	Kerry Von Erich	January 23, 1983	CSW/SLWC show	St. Louis, Missouri	1	82		
43	Jerry Blackwell	April 15, 1983	CSW/SLWC show	St. Louis, Missouri	1	28		
44	Harley Race	May 13, 1983	CSW/SLWC show	St. Louis, Missouri	5	28		
—	Vacated	June 10, 1983	—	—	—	—	Championship vacated when Champion Harley Race won the NWA World Heavyweight Championship	
45	Ric Flair	July 15, 1983	CSW/SLWC show	St. Louis, Missouri	1	63	Defeated David Von Erich in a tournament final.	
46	David Von Erich	September 16, 1983	CSW/SLWC show	St. Louis, Missouri	1	112		
47	Harley Race	January 6, 1984	CSW/SLWC show	St. Louis, Missouri	6	315		
48	Jerry Blackwell	November 16, 1984	CSW/SLWC show	St. Louis, Missouri	2	259		
49	Harley Race	August 2, 1985	CSW/SLWC show	St. Louis, Missouri	7	(Note: The date the championship was vacated has not been documented which means the championship reign lasted anywhere between 183 days and 210 days)		
—	Vacated	February 2, 1986	—	—	—	—	Championship retired when Jim Crockett Promotions bought the St. Louis Wrestling Club. Crockett also bought Central States Wrestling in September.	

== See also ==
- National Wrestling Alliance
- St. Louis Wrestling Club
- Heart of America Sports Attractions
