= AWA United States Heavyweight Championship =

Professional wrestling championship

AWA United States Championship

Details
- Promotion: National Wrestling Alliance (1953-1960); NWA Minneapolis Wrestling and Boxing Club (1958-1960); American Wrestling Association (1960-1962)
- Date established: September 3, 1953
- Date retired: 1963

Other name
- NWA United States Championship (Chicago Version)
Statistics
- First champion: Verne Gagne
- Most reigns: Wilbur Snyder (5 reigns)
- Longest reign: Verne Gagne (857 days)
- Shortest reign: Wilbur Snyder (7 days)

The AWA United States Championship was a short-lived title in the early days of the American Wrestling Association. It started out as the NWA United States Championship promoted in the Chicago, Illinois, territory from 1953 until 1958. In 1960, then champion Verne Gagne created the American Wrestling Association (AWA) based on Minneapolis, Minnesota, and took the championship with him, claiming the lineage of the Chicago version. The Chicago promotion recognized Wilbur Snyder as their next champion, splitting the lineage into their own NWA United States Heavyweight Championship (which later transferred to Detroit]. The Minneapolis version of the championship was renamed the AWA United States Championship in 1960.

== Title history ==
Key
No.	Overall reign number
Reign	Reign number for the specific champion
Days	Number of days held

No.	Champion	Championship change			Reign statistics		Notes	Ref.
No.	Champion	Date	Event	Location	Reign	Days	Notes	Ref.
National Wrestling Alliance (NWA)
1	Verne Gagne	September 3, 1953	House show	N/A	1	947	Gagne was awarded the championship	
2	Wilbur Snyder	April 7, 1956	House show	Chicago, Illinois	1	195		
3	Hans Schmidt	October 19, 1956	House show	Chicago, Illinois	1	123		
4	Wilbur Snyder	February 19, 1957	House show	Chicago, Illinois	2	298		
5	Dick the Bruiser	December 14, 1957	House show	Chicago, Illinois	1	119		
American Wrestling Association (AWA)
6	Verne Gagne	April 12, 1958	House show	Chicago, Illinois	2	857	The title was split from the original championship, which retained the same joint lineage in the Chicago territory. Minneapolis version renamed "AWA United States Championship" in 1960.	
—	Vacated	August 16, 1960	—	—	—	—	Vacated when Gagne won AWA World Heavyweight Championship.	
7	Gene Kiniski	November 19, 1960	House show	Minneapolis, Minnesota	1	17	Defeated Nick Roberts in a house show in St. Paul, Minnesota; match was not billed for the title.	
8	Wilbur Snyder	December 6, 1960	House show	Minnesota	3	7		
9	Gene Kiniski	December 13, 1960	House show	Minneapolis, Minnesota	2	64		
10	Wilbur Snyder	February 15, 1961	House show	Duluth, Minnesota	4	(Note: The exact date that the championship was lost has not been documented, which means that the title reign lasted between 1 day and 13.)		
11	Gene Kiniski	February 1961	House show	(Note: The location of the match was not captured as part of the championship documentation.)	3	(Note: The exact date that the championship was won has not been documented, which means that the title reign lasted between 1 day and 13.)		
12	Wilbur Snyder	March 1, 1961	House show	Duluth, Minnesota	5	31		
13	Gene Kiniski	April 1, 1961	House show	Saint Paul, Minnesota	4	(Note: The exact date that the championship was lost has not been documented, which means that the title reign lasted between 153 days and 182.)		
14	Hard Boiled Haggerty	September 1961	House show	Minnesota	1	(Note: The exact date that the championship was won has not been documented, which means that the title reign lasted between 17 days and 41.)	Sometime after September 5, 1961.	
15	Mr. M	October 17, 1961	House show	Minneapolis, Minnesota	1	84		
—	Vacated	January 9, 1962	—	—	—	—	Vacated when Mr. M won the AWA World Heavyweight Championship.	
16	Pat O'Connor	February 17, 1962	House show	St. Paul, Minnesota	1	(Note: The exact date the championship was abandoned has not been documented, which means that the title reign is too uncertain to calculate.)	Was awarded the NWA (Central States) version of the US Championship on August 24, 1961; defends title against Bob Geigel.	
—	Deactivated	1962	—	—	—	—	O'Connor spent the rest of his AWA stint challenging Mr. M unsuccessfully for the AWA World championship, while defending his title in other NWA territories until he lost it to Hans Schmidt on July 5, 1962, in Greensboro, North Carolina in a Jim Crockett Promotions card; AWA abandons recognition.	

== See also ==
- AWA Superstars of Wrestling United States Championship, brief revival.
- Professional wrestling in the United States
