= WWA World Tag Team Championship =

Professional wrestling tag team championship

Details
- Promotion: World Wrestling Association
- Date established: 1964
- Date retired: 1989
Statistics
- Most reigns: (As a Tag Team) Dick the Bruiser and The Crusher (6 reigns) (As Individual) Dick the Bruiser (15 reigns)
- Longest reign: Golden Lion and The Russian Brute (903 days)

The WWA World Tag Team Championship was the primary tag team title in the Indianapolis-based World Wrestling Association from the promotion's formation in 1964 until the late 1980s when the promotion closed.

== Title history ==
Key
No.	Overall reign number
Reign	Reign number for the specific team—reign numbers for the individuals are in parentheses, if different
Days	Number of days held

No.	Champion	Championship change			Reign statistics		Notes	Ref.
No.	Champion	Date	Event	Location	Reign	Days	Notes	Ref.
1	Wilbur Snyder and Dick the Bruiser	April 25, 1964	WWA show	N/A	1	97	First champions.	
2	Nicoli Volkoff and Angelo Poffo	July 31, 1964	WWA show	N/A	1	35	Won the title via countout.	
3	Wilbur Snyder and Dick the Bruiser	September 4, 1964	WWA show	Indianapolis, Indiana	2	N/A		
4	The Von Brauners (Kurt Von Brauner and Karl Von Brauner)	October 1964	WWA show	Memphis, Tennessee	1	N/A		
5	Nicoli Volkoff (2) and Boris Volkoff	May 17, 1965	WWA show	Memphis, Tennessee	1	61		
6	The Assassins (Guy Mitchell and Joe Tomasso)	July 17, 1965	WWA show	Indianapolis, Indiana	1	161		
7	Wilbur Snyder (3) and Moose Cholak	December 25, 1965	WWA show	Indianapolis, Indiana	1	68		
8	The Assassins (Guy Mitchell and Joe Tomasso)	March 3, 1966	WWA show	Fort Wayne, Indiana	2	100	Lose to Verne Gagne and Wilbur Snyder on March 26, 1966 in Chicago, Illinois but continue to be recognized in other WWA towns (WWA started working with AWA and AWA titles are recognized in Chicago thereafter).	
9	Wilbur Snyder (4) and Dick the Bruiser	June 11, 1966	WWA show	Indianapolis, Indiana	3	14		
10	The Assassins (Guy Mitchell and Joe Tomasso)	June 25, 1966	WWA show	Indianapolis, Indiana	3	28		
11	Wilbur Snyder (5) and Luis Martínez	July 23, 1966	WWA show	Indianapolis, Indiana	1	N/A		
12	Devil's Duo (Angelo Poffo (2) and Chris Markoff)	September 1966	WWA show	Lafayette, Indiana	1	N/A	Sometime after September 3, 1966.	
13	Dick the Bruiser (4) and The Crusher	January 21, 1967	WWA show	Indianapolis, Indiana	1	28		
14	Devil's Duo (Angelo Poffo (3) and Chris Markoff)	February 18, 1967	WWA show	Indianapolis, Indiana	2	147		
15	Dick the Bruiser (5) and The Crusher (2)	July 15, 1967	WWA show	Indianapolis, Indiana	2	90		
16	Mitsu Arakawa and Dr. Moto	October 13, 1967	WWA show	Indianapolis, Indiana	1	246		
—	Vacated	June 15, 1968	—	Indianapolis, Indiana	—	—	After a match against Dick the Bruiser and the Crusher.	
17	Mitsu Arakawa and Dr. Moto	July 26, 1968	WWA show	Indianapolis, Indiana	2	51	Wins a Rematch.	
18	Wilbur Snyder (6) and Pat O'Connor	September 15, 1968	WWA show	Indianapolis, Indiana	1	41		
19	Mitsu Arakawa and Dr. Moto	October 26, 1968	WWA show	Elkhart, Indiana	3	63		
20	Dick the Bruiser (6) and The Crusher (3)	December 28, 1968	WWA show	Chicago, Illinois	3	174		
21	Chain Gang (Jack Dillinger and Frank Dillinger)	June 20, 1969	WWA show	Indianapolis, Indiana	1	85		
—	Vacated	September 13, 1969	—	Chicago, Illinois	—	—	After Frank Dillinger is shot.	
22	Chain Gang (Jack Dillinger (2) and Jim Dillinger)	November 27, 1969	WWA show	Indianapolis, Indiana	2	211	Defeated Dick the Bruiser and Moose Cholak for the titles.	
23	Dick the Bruiser (7) and Bill Miller	June 26, 1970	WWA show	Indianapolis, Indiana	1	21		
24	Fabulous Kangaroos (Al Costello and Don Kent)	July 17, 1970	WWA show	Indianapolis, Indiana	1	162		
25	Wilbur Snyder (7) and Moose Cholak (2)	December 26, 1970	WWA show	Indianapolis, Indiana	2	59		
—	Vacated	February 23, 1971	—	Indianapolis, Indiana	—	—	After a match against Fabulous Kangaroos Al Costello and Don Kent.	
26	Wilbur Snyder (8) and Moose Cholak (3)	March 27, 1970	WWA show	Indianapolis, Indiana	3	448	Win the rematch.	
27	Fabulous Kangaroos (Al Costello and Don Kent)	June 18, 1971	WWA show	Indianapolis, Indiana	2	64		
28	Wilbur Snyder (9) and Paul Christy	August 21, 1971	WWA show	Indianapolis, Indiana	1	77		
29	The Blackjacks (Blackjack Lanza and Blackjack Mulligan)	November 6, 1971	WWA show	Detroit, Michigan	1	399	Repeated in Indianapolis, Indiana on December 18, 1971.	
30	Dick the Bruiser (8) and The Crusher (4)	December 9, 1972	WWA show	Chicago, Illinois	4	77	Repeated in Chicago, Illinois on December 9, 1972.	
31	Baron Von Raschke and Ernie Ladd	February 24, 1973	WWA show	Detroit, Michigan	1	147	Repeated in Indianapolis, Indianapolis on March 7, 1973.	
32	Dick the Bruiser (9) and Bruno Sammartino	July 21, 1973	WWA show	Detroit, Michigan	1	N/A		
—	Vacated	N/A	—	Indianapolis, Indiana	—	—	After a match between champions Raschke and Ladd and Bruiser and Sammartino. On September 22, 1973 in Indianapolis, Indiana Dick The Bruiser defeats Raschke and Ladd on September for himself and Sammartino.	
33	Jimmy and Johnny Valiant	January 5, 1974	WWA show	Indianapolis, Indiana	1	20		
—	Vacated	January 25, 1974	—	—	—	—	After a match against Dick the Bruiser and Bruno Sammartino.	
34	Jimmy and Johnny Valiant	February 7, 1974	WWA show	Indianapolis, Indiana	2	86	Defeat Bruiser and Sammartino in rematch.	
35	Wilbur Snyder (10) and Pepper Gomez	May 4, 1974	WWA show	Indianapolis, Indiana	1	140		
36	Legionnaires (Sgt. Jacques Goulet and Pvt. Don Fargo)	September 21, 1974	WWA show	Indianapolis, Indiana	1	N/A		
37	The New Legionnaires (Sgt. Jacques Goulet (2) and Soldier Zarinoff Lebeouf)	April 1975	WWA show	N/A	1	N/A		
38	Dick the Bruiser (10) and The Crusher (5)	September 20, 1975	WWA show	Indianapolis, Indiana	5	175		
39	Ox Baker and Chuck O'Connor	March 13, 1976	WWA show	Indianapolis, Indiana	1	49		
40	Dick the Bruiser (11) and The Crusher (6)	May 1, 1976	WWA show	Indianapolis, Indiana	6	105		
41	Bounty Hunters (David Novak and Jerry Novak)	August 14, 1976	WWA show	Indianapolis, Indiana	1	182		
42	Moose Cholak (3) and Paul Christy (2)	February 12, 1977	WWA show	Indianapolis, Indiana	1	126		
43	Jimmy and Johnny Valiant	June 18, 1977	WWA show	Indianapolis, Indiana	3	259		
44	Wilbur Snyder (11) and Dominic Denucci	March 4, 1978	WWA show	Indianapolis, Indiana	1	140		
45	Jimmy and Johnny Valiant	July 22, 1978	WWA show	Indianapolis, Indiana	4	133		
46	Wilbur Snyder (12) and Pepper Gomez (2)	December 2, 1978	WWA show	Indianapolis, Indiana	2	120		
47	Roger Kirby and Igor Volkoff	April 1, 1979	WWA show	Indianapolis, Indiana	1	N/A		
—	Vacated	May 1979	—	—	—	—	When Volkoff leaves the area.	
48	Roger Kirby (2) and Paul Christy (3)	June 9, 1979	WWA show	Indianapolis, Indiana	1	120		
49	Dick the Bruiser (12) and Spike Huber	October 7, 1979	WWA show	Indianapolis, Indiana	1	203		
50	Roger Kirby (3) and Jerry Valiant (Guy Mitchell) (4)	April 27, 1980	WWA show	Indianapolis, Indiana	1	111		
51	Wilbur Snyder (13) and Spike Huber (2)	August 16, 1980	WWA show	Indianapolis, Indiana	1	301		
52	Kelly Twins (Pat and Mike Kelly)	June 13, 1981	WWA show	Indianapolis, Indiana	1	234		
53	Wilbur Snyder (14) and Spike Huber (3)	February 2, 1982	WWA show	Peoria, Illinois	2	88		
—	Vacated	May 1, 1982	—	Springfield, Illinois	—	—	After a match against Sheik Ali Hassan and Abdullah the Great.	
54	Sheik Ali Hassan and Abdullah the Great	June 5, 1982	WWA show	Indianapolis, Indiana	1	N/A	Win the rematch.	
55	Spike Huber (4) and Steve Regal	July 1982	WWA show	Peoria, Illinois	1	N/A		
56	New York Dolls (Rick McGraw and Dream Machine)	September 25, 1982	WWA show	Memphis, Tennessee	1	N/A		
57	Spike Huber (5) and Steve Regal (2)	December 1982	WWA show	N/A	2	N/A	Awarded when the working agreement between WWA and CWA ends.	
58	Jerry Valiant (5) and Abdullah the Great (2)	June 1983	WWA show	N/A	1	N/A		
59	Dick the Bruiser (13) and Jeff Van Kamp	January 7, 1984	WWA show	Indianapolis, Indiana	1	N/A		
60	Wild Warriors (Mad Maxx and Super Maxx)	September 1984	WWA show	N/A	1	N/A		
61	Dick the Bruiser (14) and Bobby Colt	March 1985	WWA show	N/A	1	N/A		
62	Wild Hoggs (J.R. Hogg and King Harley Hogg)	March 1985	WWA show	N/A	1	N/A		
63	Chris Carter and Stormy Granzig	July 1985	WWA show	N/A	1	N/A		
64	Don Kent (3) and Jerry Graham, Jr.	July 1985	WWA show	N/A	1	N/A		
65	Chris Carter (2) and Bobo Brazil	N/A	WWA show	N/A	1	N/A		
66	Don Kent (4) and Jerry Graham, Jr. (2)	N/A	WWA show	N/A	2	N/A		
67	Chris Carter (3) and Calypso Jim	1986	WWA show	N/A	1	N/A		
68	Polynesian Wildman and Prince Mama Mohammad	1986	WWA show	N/A	1	N/A		
—	Vacated	N/A	—	—	—	—	When Mohammad was injured by Dick the Bruiser.	
69	Chris Carter (4) and Denny Kass	1986	WWA show	N/A	1	N/A	Defeated Polynesian Wildman and Golden Lion for the title.	
Championship history is unrecorded from to .
71	Chris Carter (5) and Mohammad Saad	N/A	WWA show	N/A	1	N/A		
72	Scott Rechsteiner and Jerry Graham, Jr. (3)	October 4, 1987	WWA show	N/A	1	63		
73	Don Kent (5) and Chris Carter (6)	December 6, 1987	WWA show	Toledo, Ohio	1	N/A		
—	Vacated	December 1987	—	—	—	—	When Kent and Carter split.	
74	Chris Carter (7) and Calypso Jim (2)	February 14, 1988	WWA show	Toledo, Ohio	2	62	Defeated Don Kent and Jerry Graham, Jr. for the title.	
75	Motor City Hitmen (Al Snow and Mikey Doyle)	April 16, 1988	WWA show	Toledo, Ohio	1	N/A		
76	Dick the Bruiser (15) and Calypso Jim (3)	1989	WWA show	N/A	1	N/A		
77	The Golden Lion and The Russian Brute	May 21, 1989	WWA show	Fort Wayne, Indiana	1	N/A	Defeated Dick The Bruiser and Calypso Jim.	
—		N/A	WWA show	—		N/A		
