= Wilbur Snyder =

American professional wrestler and football player (1929 – 1991)

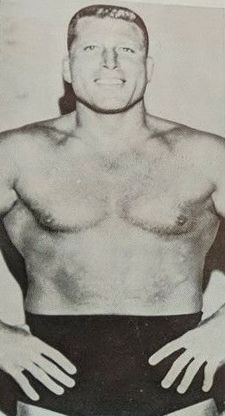
- Snyder in 1969

Personal information
- Born: September 15, 1929 Santa Monica, California, U.S.
- Died: December 25, 1991 (aged 62) Pompano Beach, Florida, U.S.

Professional wrestling career
- Ring name(s): Wilbur Snyder; California Comet
- Billed height: 6 ft 2 in (1.88 m)
- Billed weight: 235 lb (107 kg)
- Billed from: Woodland Hills, California
- Trained by: Warren Bockwinkel; Sandor Szabo
- Debut: 1953
- Retired: 1984

Wilbur Snyder (September 15, 1929 – December 25, 1991) was an American football player and professional wrestler. He played college football for the Utah Utes.

== Wrestling career ==
Snyder's wrestling debut occurred during football's 1953 off-season. He was trained by Sandor Szabo and Warren Bockwinkel in Southern California. In 1954, Snyder retired from football completely to pursue a full-time career in wrestling. Part of his in-ring persona included the use of many football tactics, and it garnered Snyder a lot of national attention. He had already been a regional champion in Montreal, Quebec, Canada when he made a name for himself by defeating Verne Gagne and winning the United States Championship at Marigold Arena in Chicago on April 7, 1956.

Snyder was a regional champion in a myriad of territories that were affiliated with the National Wrestling Alliance (NWA). One of those championships was an offshoot of the world title that he won from Verne Gagne on November 15, 1958, in Omaha, Nebraska.

After the departure of Jim Barnett, Snyder bought into the Indianapolis territory with Dick the Bruiser. The enterprise was known as Championship Wrestling Inc. on April 27, 1965. Snyder's wife Shirlee was listed as the registered agent. Snyder and Dick's mother, M.A. (Margaret) Johnston were listed as directors of the company, to keep the wrestler's ownership of the territory private.

The defeat of Mitsu Arakawa in September 1967 added the WWA title to Snyder's list of accomplishments. The victory resulted in a two-year run as WWA Champion for Snyder. Between 1956 and 1962, he was a ten time United States Champion. Snyder was also involved in long in-ring feuds with Dick the Bruiser and Hans Schmidt. Another accomplishment of Snyder's was his reign as 13-time WWA Tag Team Champion. During a tour of Japan in 1969, Snyder teamed with Danny Hodge to claim the Japan Pro-Wrestling Alliance's NWA International Tag Team Championship.

Snyder was often billed as "The World's Most Scientific Wrestler". On Bret Hart's greatest hits video Wilbur Snyder also gets a mention by Bobby "The Brain" Heenan and "Macho Man" Randy Savage. Heenan claiming Snyder basically invented the abdominal stretch.

Snyder's legacy was cemented by WWE announcer Jim Ross who would refer to "shades of the late Wilbur Snyder" anytime somebody used the abdominal stretch for most of the late 1990s and early 2000s.

== Personal life ==
Wilbur married Shirlee Ann Hanson in 1948. His son-in-law was Steve Regal. He died on December 25, 1991, aged 62, in Pompano Beach, Florida.

== Championships and accomplishments ==
- American Wrestling Alliance
  - AWA World Tag Team Championship (Indiana version) (2 times) – with Dick the Bruiser
- American Wrestling Association
  - AWA United States Heavyweight Championship (3 times)
  - AWA World Tag Team Championship (2 times) – with Leo Nomellini (1) and Pat O'Connor (1)
  - World Heavyweight Championship (Omaha version) (2 times)
- Big Time Wrestling (San Francisco)
  - NWA United States Heavyweight Championship (San Francisco version) (1 time)
  - NWA World Tag Team Championship (San Francisco version) (1 time) – with Nick Bockwinkel
- Fred Kohler Enterprises
  - NWA United States Heavyweight Championship (Chicago version) (2 times)
- George Tragos/Lou Thesz Professional Wrestling Hall of Fame
  - Class of 2014
- International Wrestling Association (Montreal)
  - IWA International Heavyweight Championship (1 time)
- Japan Wrestling Association
  - NWA International Tag Team Championship (1 time) – with Danny Hodge
- Midwest Wrestling Association
  - NWA Eastern States Heavyweight Championship (1 time)
  - NWA United States Tag Team Championship (Ohio version) (1 time) – with Dick the Bruiser
- NWA Detroit
  - NWA United States Heavyweight Championship (Detroit version) (2 times)
- World Wrestling Associates/NWA Hollywood Wrestling
  - NWA "Beat the Champ" Television Championship (2 times)
  - WWA International Television Tag Team Championship (4 times) – with Sandor Szabo (2) and Bobo Brazil (2)
- NWA Western States Sports
  - NWA World Tag Team Championship (Texas version) (2 times) – with Verne Gagne (1) and Pepper Gomez (1)
- St. Louis Wrestling Hall of Fame
  - Class of 2014
- World Wrestling Association
  - WWA World Tag Team Championship (14 times) – with Dick the Bruiser (3), Moose Cholak (3), Luis Martinez (1), Pat O'Connor (1), Paul Christy (1), Pepper Gomez (2), Dominic Denucci (1), and Spike Huber (2)
- Worldwide Wrestling Associates
  - WWA International Television Tag Team Championship (4 times) – with Sandor Szabo (2) and Bobo Brazil (2)

== See also ==
- List of gridiron football players who became professional wrestlers
