= NWA British Empire Heavyweight Championship (Vancouver version) =

Professional wrestling championship

The Vancouver version of the NWA British Empire Heavyweight Championship was defended as the top singles title in Vancouver-based Big Time Wrestling and its successor, NWA All Star Wrestling, from 1959 until sometime after the last champion, Gene Kiniski, won the title in 1963

== Title history ==
Key
No.	Overall reign number
Reign	Reign number for the specific champion
Days	Number of days held
(NLT)	Championship change took place "no later than" the date listed

No.	Champion	Championship change			Reign statistics		Notes	Ref.
No.	Champion	Date	Event	Location	Reign	Days	Notes	Ref.
1	Whipper Billy Watson	July 1959 (NLT)	ASW Show	N/A	1	N/A	Reigning Toronto version champion - recognized in Vancouver	
2	Gene Kiniski	August 21, 1961	ASW Show	Vancouver, BC	1	2		
3	Whipper Billy Watson	August 23, 1961	ASW Show	Vancouver, BC	2	478		
4	Mike Sharpe Sr.	December 14, 1962	ASW Show	Calgary, Alberta	1	7		
5	Whipper Billy Watson	December 21, 1962	ASW Show	Calgary, Alberta	3	213		
6	Gene Kiniski	July 22, 1963	ASW Show	Vancouver, BC	2	N/A		
—	Deactivated	N/A	—	—	—	—		

== See also ==
- List of National Wrestling Alliance championships
