= Dick the Bruiser =

American football player and professional wrestler (1929–1991)

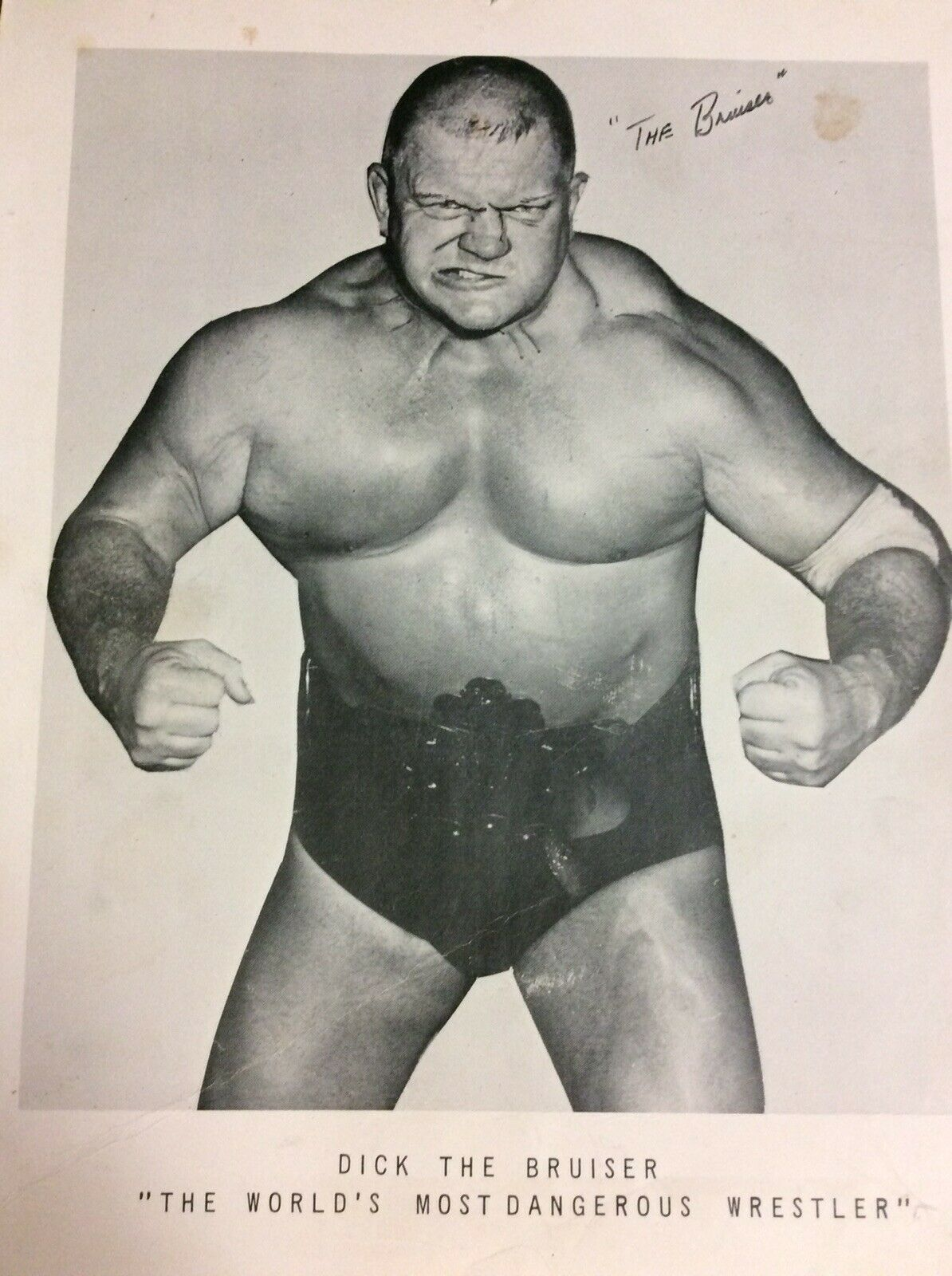
- Dick the Bruiser in 1969

Personal information
- Born: William Fritz Afflis Jr. June 27, 1929 Delphi, Indiana, U.S.
- Died: November 10, 1991 (aged 62) Tampa, Florida, U.S.
- Education: Purdue University

Professional wrestling career
- Ring name(s): Afflis; Dick Bruiser; Dick the Bruiser; Richard Afflis
- Billed height: 6 ft 1 in (1.85 m)
- Billed weight: 261 lb (118 kg)
- Billed from: Reno, Nevada
- Trained by: Verne Gagne; Joe Pazandak
- Debut: 1954
- Retired: 1989
- Football career

No. 15, 62, 72, 75
- Positions: Guard, Tackle

Career information
- College: Nevada
- NFL draft: 1951: 16th round, 186th overall pick

Career history
- Green Bay Packers (1951–1954)
- Stats at Pro Football Reference

William Fritz Afflis Jr. (June 27, 1929 – November 10, 1991) was an American professional wrestler, promoter, and National Football League player, better known by his ring name, Dick the Bruiser. During his NFL days he played four seasons with the Green Bay Packers.

He was also a very successful professional wrestler: sixteen-time world champion, AWA World Heavyweight Champion once, WWA World Heavyweight Champion (Indianapolis version) thirteen times, World Heavyweight Champion (Omaha version) once, and WWA World Heavyweight Champion (Los Angeles version) once. He also excelled at tag-team wrestling, with 20 tag team championships in his career. Eleven of these championships were won alongside his long-time tag-team partner Crusher Lisowski.

He was one of the most well known heels from the mid-1950s until the early 1980s, famous for his feuds with the likes of Lou Thesz, Bobo Brazil, Angelo Poffo, and "Classy" Freddie Blassie. He is an inductee of the International Wrestling Hall of Fame, St. Louis Wrestling Hall of Fame, WCW Hall of Fame, Wrestling Observer Newsletter Hall of Fame, and WWE Hall of Fame.

== Early life ==
Born in Delphi, Indiana, Afflis moved to Indianapolis when his mother got a job there during World War II. Afflis played football during his freshman and sophomore years for Shortridge High School in Indianapolis. After his mother lost her job, the family moved back to Delphi, but the high school did not have a football team.

Afflis took up residence at the YMCA in nearby Lafayette, Indiana, so that he was eligible to attend Lafayette Jefferson High School, where he played football and wrestled. Afflis went on to attend Purdue University and the University of Nevada, Reno, playing varsity football at both schools. He also worked as a bouncer at a Reno nightclub.

== American football career ==
Selected 186th overall in the 16th round of the 1951 professional football draft, Afflis played football for the Green Bay Packers from 1951 to 1954 as a lineman. He appeared in all 48 regular season games the Packers played in those years, although the team never finished better than fourth place. Afflis suffered an injury to his larynx while playing for the Packers. This resulted in his trademark gravelly voice that he would keep for the rest of his life.

== Professional wrestling career ==
Bruiser made his professional wrestling debut in 1954. He was trained by Verne Gagne. Afflis started wrestling in Chicago in 1955 under the Bruiser moniker where he faced Gagne and Lou Thesz. Gagne guided him in his initial days of becoming a professional wrestler. From then into the late 1950s, Dick the Bruiser wrestled live every Thursday on TV in the Detroit area. His typical opponent was "an up and coming young (unknown) wrestler" who would be pulverized by the Bruiser. His matches and interviews were so effective he became a household name in the Detroit area. His only defeat on live TV was at the hands of “Cowboy” Bob Ellis. However, in two rematches with Ellis at the Olympia in Detroit, the Bruiser was victorious.

Author Richard Vicek who wrote "Bruiser: The World's Most Dangerous Wrestler," said "It's amazing how quickly his career took off, and it was his ability to project ferociousness," Vicek said. "That made him unique. He was a villain when he started out. He didn't change his wrestling style to flying dropkicks, head scissors; he was ... a brawler. When people saw him on TV, and that growling voice, they bought into it. Even if you suspected wrestling was a put-on, when you saw Bruiser looking into the camera with a microphone in his face, growling about what the weasel Bobby Heenan did to me last week at the coliseum, you believed it."

In 1963, Dick the Bruiser joined up with NFL star Alex Karras to set up a match between the two. Bruiser was supposed to brawl with Karras at Lindell's Bar, a drinking establishment co-owned by Karras and the Butsicaris brothers. What was supposed to be a worked shoot turned into a real brawl when one of the Butsicaris boys' uncles attacked Dick the Bruiser, unaware the event was staged. Bruiser proceeded to destroy the bar and injure a number of police officers who showed up to the melee; there were reportedly over 300 people hurt. In the end, eight officers subdued him, and the Bruiser ultimately won the match. He was charged with aggravated assault and had to cover $50,000 in damages for two policemen that he injured during the brawl.

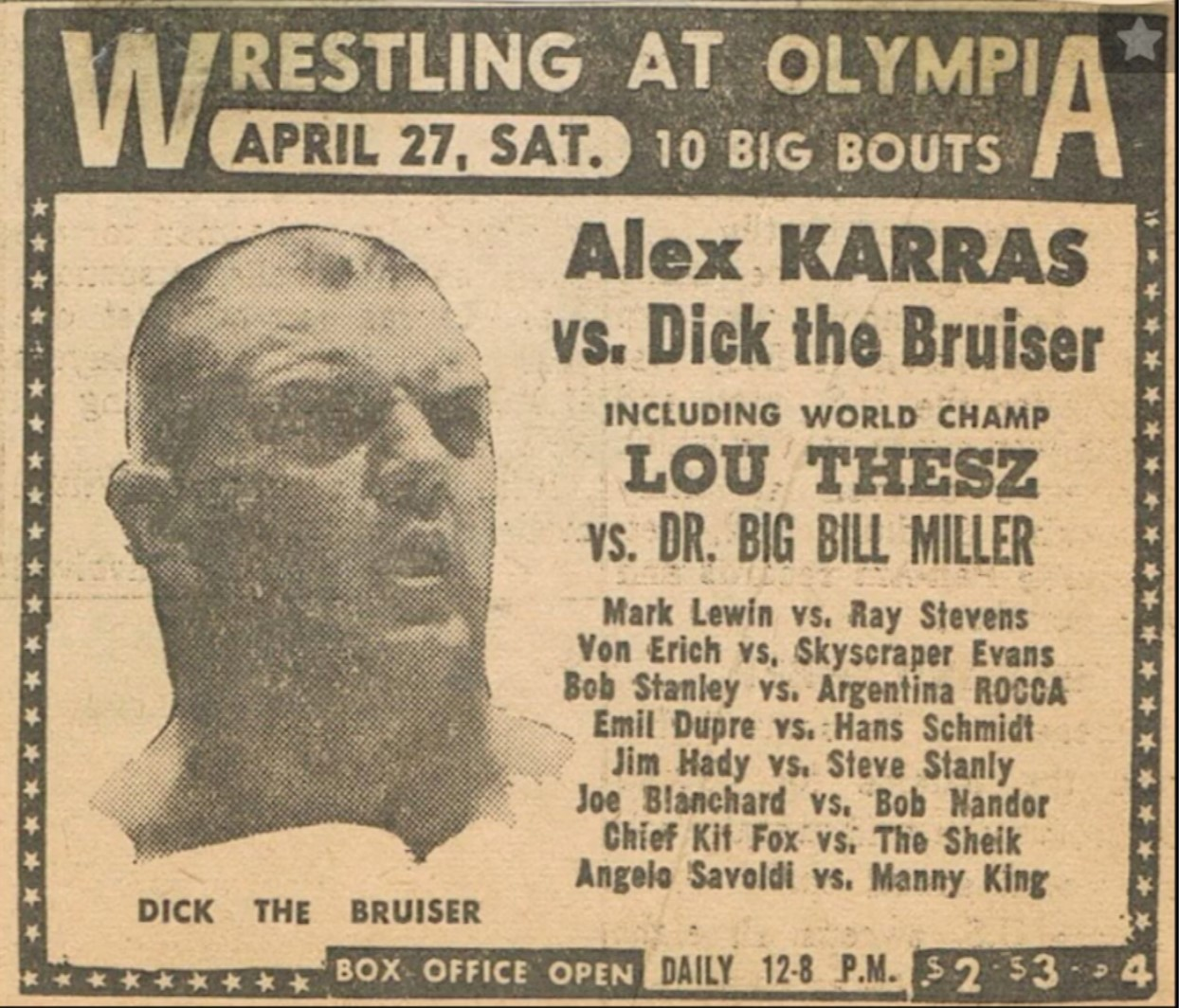
Poster of Dick the Bruiser vs Alex Karras in 1963

On November 19, 1957, Dick the Bruiser and Dr. Jerry Graham engaged in a tag team match at Madison Square Garden in New York City before a crowd of 12,987. Their opponents were Antonino Rocca and Édouard Carpentier. After the match ended, fighting among the wrestlers continued, and a large number of fans joined in, leading to a riot. Two policemen were injured, two fans were arrested, and over 60 policemen had difficulty dispersing the angry crowd. The floor of the arena was littered with hundreds of broken chairs. As a result, Afflis was banned for life by the New York State Athletic Commission.

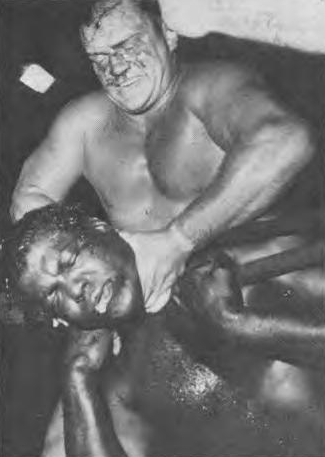
Dick the Bruiser chokes Bobo Brazil

Afflis, along with fellow wrestler and business partner Wilbur Snyder, purchased the Indianapolis NWA promotion in 1964 from its longtime owner Jim Barnett. Afflis renamed the territory to the World Wrestling Association (WWA) and promoted himself as its champion. While he ran it as an independent promotion with its own titles and champion, the WWA had a working agreement with the larger AWA (owned by his old trainer Verne Gagne), sharing talent and recognizing their championships. This agreement benefited both promotions and led to the Bruiser winning the AWA World Tag Team Championships five times, with tag team partner, The Crusher, who was billed as his "cousin".

Afflis was also the first to christen manager Bobby Heenan with the nickname of "The Weasel" during his run in the territory. Afflis' WWA ran for about 25 years. In 1989, finally tired of losing talent, TV, and fan attendance to the World Wrestling Federation (WWF), Afflis shut down the promotion. In 1971, he teamed with The Sheik and faced Crazy Luke Graham and Tarzan Tyler for the newly created WWWF Tag Team Championship, which Graham and Tyler won.

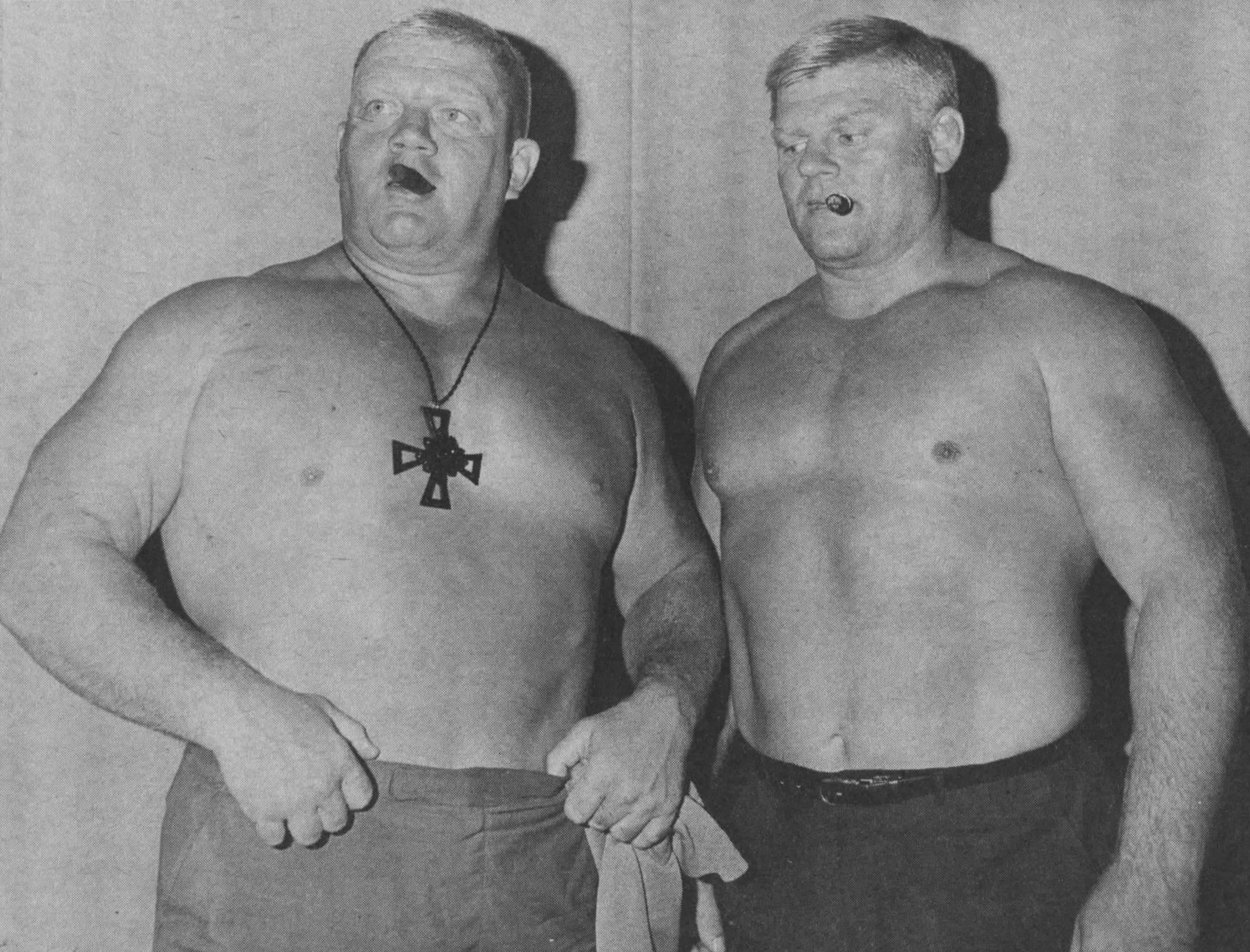
Dick the Bruiser in 1973 along with Crusher Lisowski

Afflis, with his charisma, NFL notoriety, and gravelly-voiced, tough-guy persona was a legitimate cross-media star, becoming something of a hero in the Indianapolis area. He made his home on the northwest side of the city. Indianapolis native David Letterman (whose career would be launched by the Bruiser) would later name his television show's band The World's Most Dangerous Band as a derivation of Dick the Bruiser's nickname, "The World's Most Dangerous Wrestler".

The moniker "Dick the Bruiser" was even used in the 1980s by George Baier, a co-host of the morning drive show on Detroit rock radio station WRIF. Baier's "Richard T. Bruiser" was an effective, entertaining impersonation of Afflis, who actually played himself in a number of popular TV ads for WRIF. After retiring, Afflis was a color commentator for the Gorgeous Ladies of Wrestling (GLOW), founded by David McLane, who had previously risen through the ranks as a teenager to manage the WWA for Afflis. He also worked as a talent agent for World Championship Wrestling (WCW), and was the special guest referee at the Starrcade 1990 main event between Sting and the Black Scorpion.

== Personal life and death ==
Bruiser's son, Karl Afflis, briefly pursued a career in professional wrestling under the ring name Leroy Redbone, competing primarily for his father's promotion. His son-in-law Dick the Bruiser Jr. wrestled in the independent circuit.

Afflis died of internal bleeding on November 10, 1991, according to a spokesman for Suncoast Hospital in Largo, Florida, near his winter home. His widow, Louise, said her husband had been weightlifting at home with his adopted son, Jon Carney, and ruptured a blood vessel in his esophagus.

== Championships and accomplishments ==
- 50th State Big Time Wrestling
  - NWA United States Heavyweight Championship (Hawaii version) (1 time)
- American Wrestling Alliance
  - AWA World Tag Team Championship (2 times) – with Wilbur Snyder
- American Wrestling Association
  - AWA World Heavyweight Championship (1 time)
  - AWA World Tag Team Championship (5 times) – with The Crusher
  - World Heavyweight Championship (Omaha version) (1 time)
  - AWA United States Heavyweight Championship (1 time)
- Big Time Wrestling
  - NWA United States Heavyweight Championship (Detroit version) (4 times)
- Big Time Wrestling (Omaha)
  - World Tag Team Championship ( 1 time ) - with Hans Schmidt
- Fred Kohler Enterprises
  - NWA United States Heavyweight Championship (Chicago version) (1 time)
  - NWA World Tag Team Championship (Chicago version) (1 time) – with Gene Kiniski
- Japan Wrestling Association
  - NWA International Tag Team Championship (1 time) – with The Crusher
- Pro Wrestling Illustrated
  - PWI Tag Team of the Year (1972) with The Crusher
  - Ranked #300 of the top 500 singles wrestlers of the "PWI Years" in 2003
- Professional Wrestling Hall of Fame
  - (Class of 2005) – Tag Team with Crusher
  - (Class of 2011) – Television Era
- St. Louis Wrestling Club
  - NWA Missouri Heavyweight Championship (3 times)
- St. Louis Wrestling Hall of Fame
  - (Class of 2007)
- World Championship Wrestling
  - WCW Hall of Fame (Class of 1994)
- World Wrestling Association
  - WWA World Heavyweight Championship (13 times)
  - WWA World Tag Team Championship (15 times) – with The Crusher (6), Wilbur Snyder (3), Bruno Sammartino (1), Bill Miller (1), Spike Huber (1), Jeff Van Kamp (1), Bobby Colt (1) and Calypso Jim (1)
- Worldwide Wrestling Associates
  - WWA World Heavyweight Championship (1 time)
- Wrestling Observer Newsletter Hall of Fame
  - Wrestling Observer Newsletter Hall of Fame (Class of 1996)
- WWE
  - WWE Hall of Fame (Class of 2021)
- Other titles
  - World Heavyweight Championship (Georgia version) (1 time)

== See also ==
- List of gridiron football players who became professional wrestlers
