= World Wrestling Association (Indianapolis) =

American professional wrestling promotion (1964–1989)

- Acronym: WWA
- Founded: March 1964
- Defunct: 1989
- Style: American wrestling
- Headquarters: Indiana
- Founder(s): Dick the Bruiser; Wilbur Snyder
- Owner(s): Dick the Bruiser; Wilbur Snyder
- Sister: Powerful Women of Wrestling
- Split from: NWA Indianapolis

The World Wrestling Association was an Indianapolis-based professional wrestling promotion which was operated by Dick the Bruiser and his business partner Wilbur Snyder. It was affiliated with the larger American Wrestling Association and recognized its champions, along with its own and those of the Indianapolis-based Powerful Women of Wrestling. It ran from 1964 to 1989.

== History ==
The World Wrestling Association (WWA), operating under the legal name Championship Wrestling of Indiana, Inc., was established in 1964 by William Afflis and Wilbur Snyder. The duo purchased the Indianapolis NWA promotion in 1964 from its longtime owner Jim Barnett, who at that time was attempting to start up a promotion in Australia. The name of the promotion was taken from the former promotions in the Chicago and Los Angeles areas.

In 1965, the WWA purchased the Chicago-based Fred Kohler Enterprises from Fred Kohler. In May of the same year, the promotion ceased promoting events in Detroit.

The promotion developed wrestlers such as Bobby Heenan and amateur wrestler Greg Wojciechowski. Wojciechowski wrestled for the WWA under the name "The Great Wojo" and held the WWA World Heavyweight Championship three times. In later years, Scott Steiner got his start in the WWA under his real name, Scott Rechsteiner.

A talent sharing agreement with American Wrestling Association (AWA) head (and longtime champion) Verne Gagne brought forth other talent, including The Crusher and Baron von Raschke. The WWA also put on joint wrestling events with the AWA starting in 1966. In 1971, the WWA returned to promoting events in Detroit in competition with the NWA Detroit until 1975.

The WWA tried to make a go of it in the mid-1980s, when Vince McMahon's World Wrestling Federation (WWF) was buying regional promotions across the country, but the Bruiser's advancing age and the talent drain to the WWF were too much, and the WWA ceased promoting matches in 1989.

== Territory area ==
=== Major cities ===
==== Canada ====
- Windsor, Ontario

==== United States ====
- Chicago, Illinois
- Indianapolis, Indiana
- Louisville, Kentucky
- Detroit, Michigan
- Toledo, Ohio
- Milwaukee, Wisconsin

=== Minor towns ===
- Anderson, Indiana
- Austin, Indiana
- Bedford, Indiana
- Bloomington, Indiana
- Columbus, Indiana
- Elkhart, Indiana
- Elnora, Indiana
- Elwood, Indiana
- Evansville, Indiana
- Fort Wayne, Indiana
- Gary, Indiana
- Hammond, Indiana
- Jasper, Indiana
- Kokomo, Indiana
- LaGrange, Indiana
- Loogootee, Indiana
- Muncie, Indiana
- Nappanee, Indiana
- Noblesville, Indiana
- North Vernon, Indiana
- Romeoville, Indiana
- South Bend, Indiana
- Terre Haute, Indiana
- Vincennes, Indiana
- Wabash, Indiana
- Warren, Indiana
- West Lafayette, Indiana
- Bartonville, Illinois
- Champaign, Illinois
- Danville, Illinois
- Joliet, Illinois
- Paris, Illinois
- Peoria, Illinois
- Springfield, Illinois
- Sumner, Illinois
- Benton Harbor, Michigan
- Livonia, Michigan
- Ypsilanti, Michigan
- Bucyrus, Ohio

== Championships ==
- WWA World Heavyweight Championship
- WWA World Tag Team Championship
