= Hans Schmidt (wrestler) =

Canadian professional wrestler (1925–2012)

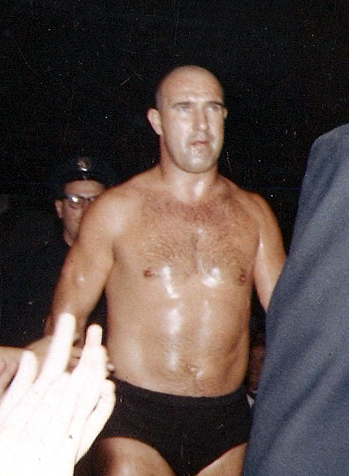

Personal information
- Born: Guy Larose; 7 February 1925 Joliette, Quebec, Canada
- Died: 26 May 2012 (aged 87) Joliette, Quebec, Canada

Professional wrestling career
- Ring name(s): Hans Schmidt; Guy Rose; Roy Asselin
- Billed height: 6 ft 4 in (193 cm)
- Billed weight: 250 lb (113 kg)
- Billed from: Munich, Germany
- Debut: 1949
- Retired: 1976

Guy Larose (7 February 1925 – 26 May 2012), better known by his ring name Hans Schmidt, was a Canadian professional wrestler famous in the 1950s and 1960s. His gimmick of a German pseudo-Nazi heel gained him considerable notoriety, and popularized the proliferation of similar gimmicks through Canadian and American wrestling.

== Early life ==
Larose was born in Joliette, Quebec, in 1925 and was an amateur wrestler in his youth. He initially pursued a career in law enforcement but dropped out of the Royal Canadian Mounted Police’s training academy after being disillusioned by its treatment of Indigenous people.

== Wrestling career ==
Larose used a background in amateur wrestling to break into the pro-business after World War II, wrestling as a babyface under his name with modest success early on. Then, in 1951, the Boston-area promoter Paul Bowser, who thought the tall, naturally balding Franco-Québécois looked like a German, renamed him Hans Schmidt. Playing the character of an 'evil German', Schmidt became one of the first great heels of televised wrestling in the 1950s, drawing the hatred of fans as he battled their American babyface heroes of the squared circle. In the 1998 A&E documentary The Unreal Story of Professional Wrestling, Hans Schmidt was labeled "the classic foreign villain" - tapping into lingering anti-German sentiment in America following World War II, Schmidt was a forerunner of many other wrestling characters that successfully used the "anti-American foreigner" gimmick to enrage the crowd, such as Nikolai Volkoff and The Iron Sheik.

Nicknamed The Teuton Terror, Schmidt wrestled a rough, aggressive, scientific style, often with rule-breaking. He often finished his opponents off with a backbreaker, and was also known to use the piledriver as well. Fellow wrestlers recalled that he liked to work stiff on them, particularly with his boots, a practice for which he earned the nickname "Footsie".

Schmidt wrestled in territories all over North America but was particularly a big name in Chicago, Milwaukee and Toronto. By 1954, he was so thoroughly hated by wrestling audiences that he turned "Nature Boy" Buddy Rogers into a face simply by wrestling a match against him. He later said that at the peak of his career, between live events and TV tapings, he was wrestling as many as eight matches a week.

He wrestled for Capitol Wrestling Corporation in New York City from 1957 to 1962.

Schmidt wrestled Lou Thesz several times for the NWA World Heavyweight Championship and faced many other legends of the era, such as Verne Gagne, Antonino Rocca and Whipper Billy Watson. He was naturally partnered up in tag team action with other 'evil German' wrestlers around at the time, such as Karl von Hess and Ludwig von Krupp. He also frequently tag-teamed with Dick 'The Bulldog' Brower. In the wake of Schmidt's success in drawing heel heat, other wrestlers took the 'German heel' gimmick and pushed it to greater extremes with goose-stepping, fascist saluting and the use of Nazi iconography. Schmidt never took it to this level himself, though he was known to wear a helmet to the ring later in his career.

Near the end of his career in the 1970s, Schmidt worked around the Montreal region, still a heel but billed as hailing from Chicago. In 1975, Schimdt worked for New Japan Pro Wrestling. He retired from wrestling in 1976.

During the 1980s, a man named M.L. Smith appeared on the game show Card Sharks, claiming to have wrestled as Hans Schmidt. Guy Larose spent his retirement years in the Laurentian Mountains north of Montreal until his death on May 26, 2012. He is survived by two children, as well as his wife and stepchildren.

== Championships and accomplishments ==
- All-Star Wrestling (Montreal)
  - World/International Heavyweight Championship (Montreal version) (5 times)
- American Wrestling Association
  - AWA United States Heavyweight Championship (1 time)
- Big Time Wrestling
  - BTW United States Heavyweight Championship (1 time)
- Fred Kohler Enterprises
  - NWA United States Heavyweight Championship (Chicago version) (1 time)
- Georgia Championship Wrestling
  - NWA Georgia Southern Tag Team Championship (1 time) - with El Mongol
- NWA Florida
  - NWA World Television Title Championship (Florida Version) (1 time)
- NWA Los Angeles
  - NWA World Tag Team Championship (Los Angeles version) (1 time) - with Hans Herman
  - WWA International Television Tag Team Championship (1 time) - with Hans Herman
- Professional Wrestling Hall of Fame
  - Class of 2016
- Wrestling Observer Newsletter
  - Wrestling Observer Newsletter Hall of Fame (Class of 2012)
