= Verne Gagne =

American professional wrestler and football player (1926–2015)

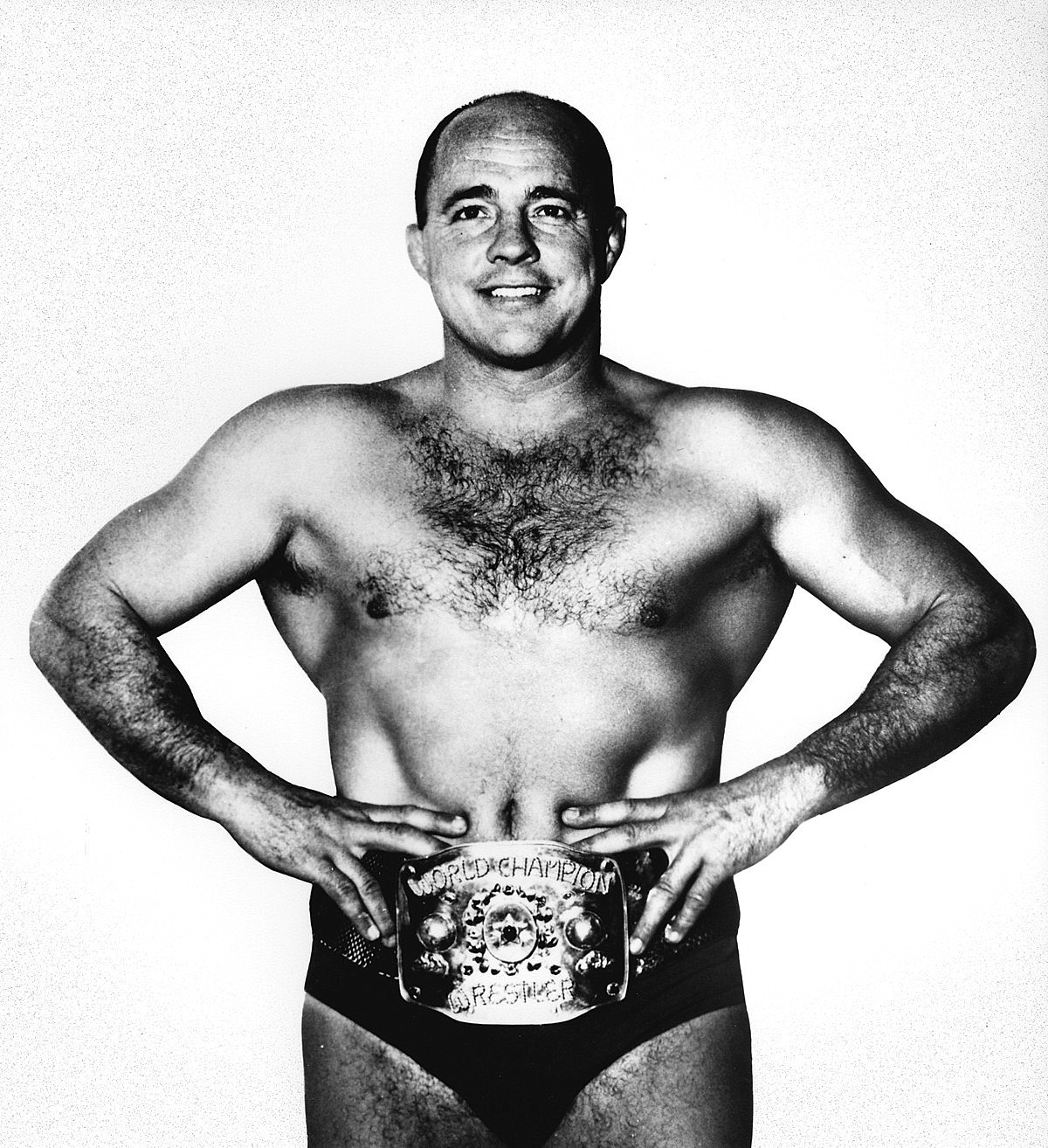
- Gagne in 1964 as AWA World Heavyweight Champion

Personal information
- Born: Laverne Clarence Gagne; February 26, 1926 Corcoran, Minnesota, U.S.
- Died: April 27, 2015 (aged 89) Bloomington, Minnesota, U.S.
- Education: University of Minnesota
- Children: 4, including Greg Gagne

Professional wrestling career
- Ring name: Verne Gagne
- Billed height: 5 ft 11 in (180 cm)
- Billed weight: 215 lb (98 kg)
- Trained by: Joe Pazandak; Tony Stecher
- Debut: 1949
- Retired: 1986
- Military service
- Allegiance: United States
- Branch: United States Navy; United States Marine Corps
- Service years: 1943–1946
- Unit: Underwater Demolition Team
- Conflicts: World War II

Medal record

Collegiate Wrestling

Representing the Minnesota Golden Gophers

NCAA Championships
Gold medal – first place	1948 Bethlehem	191 lb
Gold medal – first place	1949 Fort Collins	Heavyweight
Bronze medal – third place	1947 Champaign	Heavyweight

Laverne Clarence "Verne" Gagne (/ˈɡɑːnjeɪ/ GAHN-yay; February 26, 1926 – April 27, 2015) was an American amateur and professional wrestler, football player, wrestling trainer and wrestling promoter. He was the owner and promoter of the Minneapolis-based American Wrestling Association (AWA), the predominant promotion throughout the Midwest and Manitoba for many years. He remained in this position until 1991, when the company folded.

As an amateur wrestler, Gagne won two NCAA titles and was an alternate for the U.S. freestyle wrestling team at the 1948 Olympic Games before turning professional in 1949. Gagne was an 11-time world champion in major professional wrestling promotions, having held the AWA World Heavyweight Championship ten times and the IWA World Heavyweight Championship once as the IWA World Heavyweight Championship was considered a world championship in Japan. He has also won top professional wrestling promotions World Heavyweight Championships such as the World Heavyweight Championship (Omaha version) five times. He holds the record for the longest combined reign as a world champion in North America and is third (behind Bruno Sammartino and Lou Thesz) for the longest single world title reign. (Note: WWE does not recognize the AWA title as a world championship, making Bruno the longest combined-reigning world champion.) He is one of only seven men inducted into each of the WWE, WCW and Professional Wrestling halls of fame.

== Early life ==
Gagne was born in Corcoran, Minnesota, and grew up on a farm in Robbinsdale, Minnesota. He left home at the age of 14 after his mother died. He attended Robbinsdale High School, where he went on to win the state championship for high school wrestling in 1942 and 1943. In 1943, he was recruited to play football at the University of Minnesota as defensive end and tight end, while also continuing wrestling. As a freshman, Gagne won the Big Ten 175 pound wrestling title in 1944 after returning from duty in the Marine Corps.

== Amateur wrestling career ==
Gagne's football and wrestling career was interrupted by a tour of duty with the United States Marine Corps in 1943. He played on the Marines Football Team with the likes of Elroy "Crazy Legs" Hirsch, Gopher Great George Franck and other NFL Stars. Gagne also served with the U.S. Navy's Underwater Demolition Team. He chose to return to the University of Minnesota, where, as an amateur wrestler, he captured two NCAA titles. In 1948, he beat Charles Gottfried of Illinois in the 191-pound class to win his first NCAA championship in Pennsylvania.

The next year, he returned to the championships but had moved up a class, to heavyweight. In the final, he met future NWA World Heavyweight Champion Dick Hutton, the two-time defending national champion in the division. The showdown ended in a 1–1 tie, but Gagne was awarded the win because he controlled Hutton for longer periods of the match.

He was also an alternate for the U.S. freestyle wrestling team at the 1948 Olympic Games, after losing a closely contested wrestle-off match to the eventual gold medalist Henry Wittenberg. He earned the starting spot for the U.S. Greco-Roman wrestling team for the 1948 Olympics by finishing second in the U.S. freestyle wrestle-offs, but upon arriving to London, the U.S. coaches decided that the Greco-Roman team would not be competing.

== Football career ==
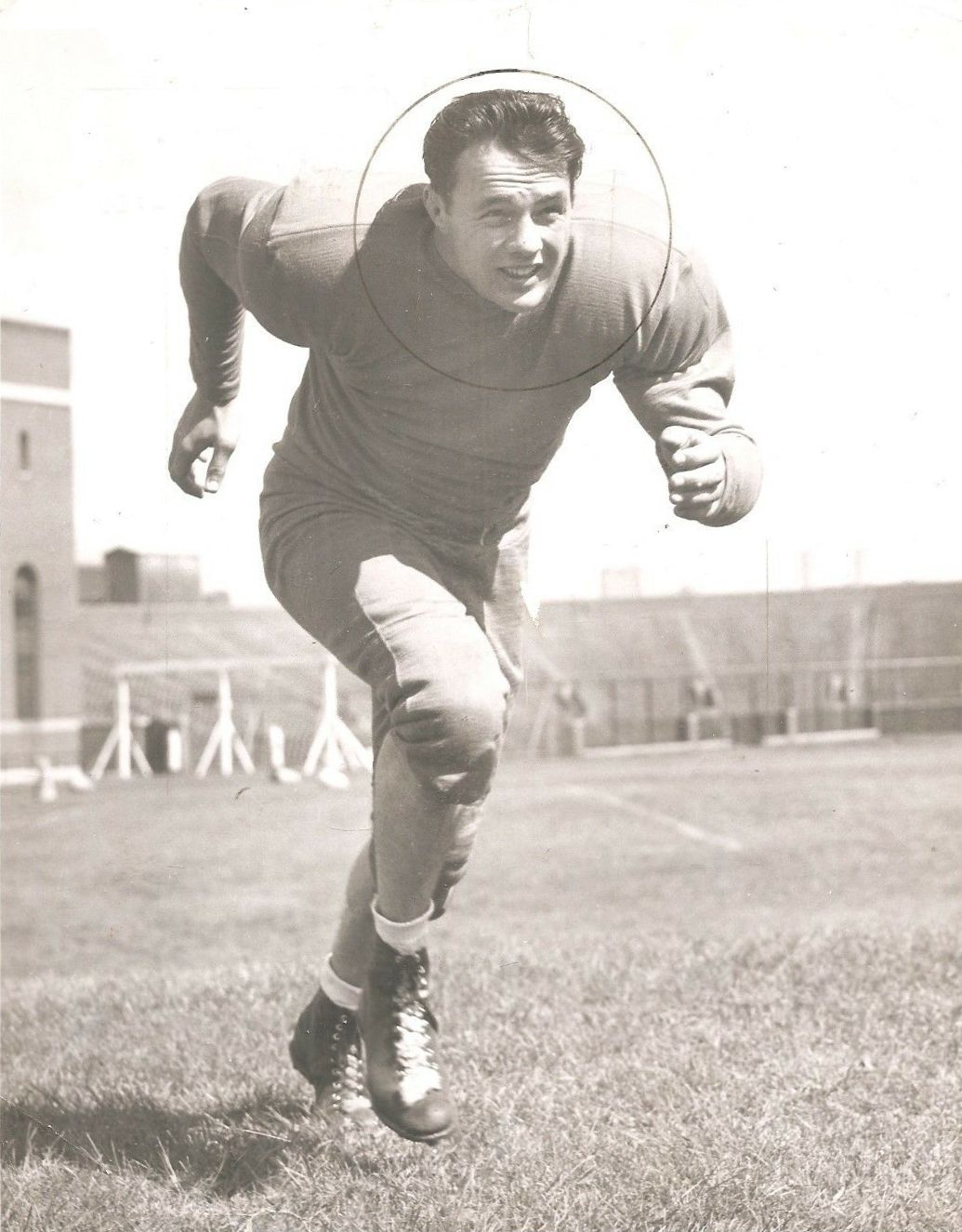
Gagne in the 1940s

Gagne joined the National Football League (NFL) soon after being drafted by the Chicago Bears in the 16th round (145th pick) of the 1947 NFL draft.

In 2006's The Spectacular Legacy of the AWA, Verne's son, Greg, said in an interview that Bears owner George Halas prevented his father from pursuing both football and wrestling, and forced him to make a choice. In the same interview, Greg mentioned that wrestling was a much better paying job at the time than playing football and as a result, Verne chose wrestling over football.

By 1949, Gagne had signed with the NFL's Green Bay Packers. He went on to play three preseason games with the Packers before being released.

== Professional wrestling career ==
=== National Wrestling Alliance (1949–1960) ===
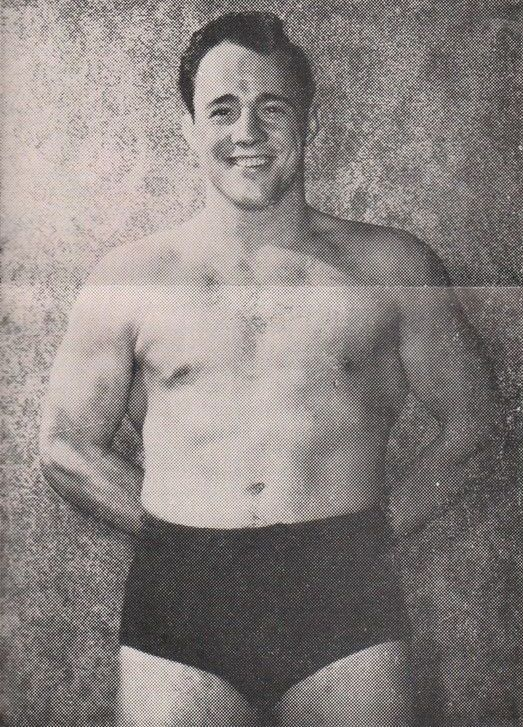
Gagne in the early 1950s

In 1949, Gagne decided to wrestle professionally, starting his career in Texas. In his debut, he defeated Abe Kashey, with former World Heavyweight boxing Champion Jack Dempsey as the referee. On November 13, 1950, Gagne captured the National Wrestling Alliance (NWA) Junior Heavyweight title in a tournament for the vacant championship.

In September 1953 in Fred Kohler Enterprises, Gagne was awarded the newly created Chicago version of the NWA United States Championship. Gagne became one of the most well-known stars in wrestling during the golden age of television, thanks to his exposure on the Dumont Network, where he wowed audiences with his technical prowess. He was rumored to be one of the highest-paid wrestlers during the 1950s, reportedly earning a hundred thousand dollars a year.

On June 14, 1957, Edouard Carpentier defeated NWA Champion Lou Thesz in Chicago. The NWA later overruled the decision of the referee in Chicago and gave the title back to Thesz. However, certain wrestling territories of the NWA including Nebraska refused to go along with the decision and continued to recognize Carpentier. Carpentier lost his title to Gagne in Omaha on August 9, 1958, making him the recognized NWA World champion in the NWA territories that had recognized Carpentier, before dropping the belt three months later to Wilbur Snyder. By early 1960, the wealthy Gagne rarely wrestled and turned his focus towards building a wrestling promotion of his own.

=== American Wrestling Association (1960–1991) ===
In 1960, Gagne formed his own promotion, the American Wrestling Alliance (later it became Association). Before this, the Minneapolis territory was under the National Wrestling Alliance (NWA) umbrella. Setting up to pull away from the NWA, the Minneapolis territory (as it was known), gave a "story-line only" edict to the NWA in May 1960 that unless their NWA World Champion Pat O'Connor defended his title against Verne Gagne with 90 days, Verne Gagne would become recognized World Champion by default. There was never any intention of such a match taking place. At the end of the 90 day period, the AWA was formed in August 1960 and it was announced that because NWA champion Pat O'Connor failed to meet Gagne, that the AWA recognized Gagne as the first AWA World Champion. He dropped the title to Gene Kiniski on July 11, 1961.

Some of Gagne's biggest feuds were against Gene Kiniski, Dr. Bill Miller (under a mask both as Dr. X and then Mr. M), Fritz Von Erich, Dr. X, The Crusher, Ray Stevens, Mad Dog Vachon, Larry Hennig, Yukon Johns, the Czar, and Nick Bockwinkel while champion and title changes. He always wrestled as a face and utilized the sleeper hold as his finisher. His longest reign as champion was for 7 years, from August 31, 1968, to November 8, 1975, dropping the title to Nick Bockwinkel. He would regain the title from Bockwinkel on July 18, 1980, and drop it back to Bockwinkel on May 19, 1981.

After his last title loss in 1981, Gagne would wrestle occasionally for AWA until 1986. Gagne's last match was a six-man tag with his son Greg, and Jimmy Snuka defeating Boris Zhukov, John Nord and Sheik Adnan Al-Kassie on June 29, 1986.

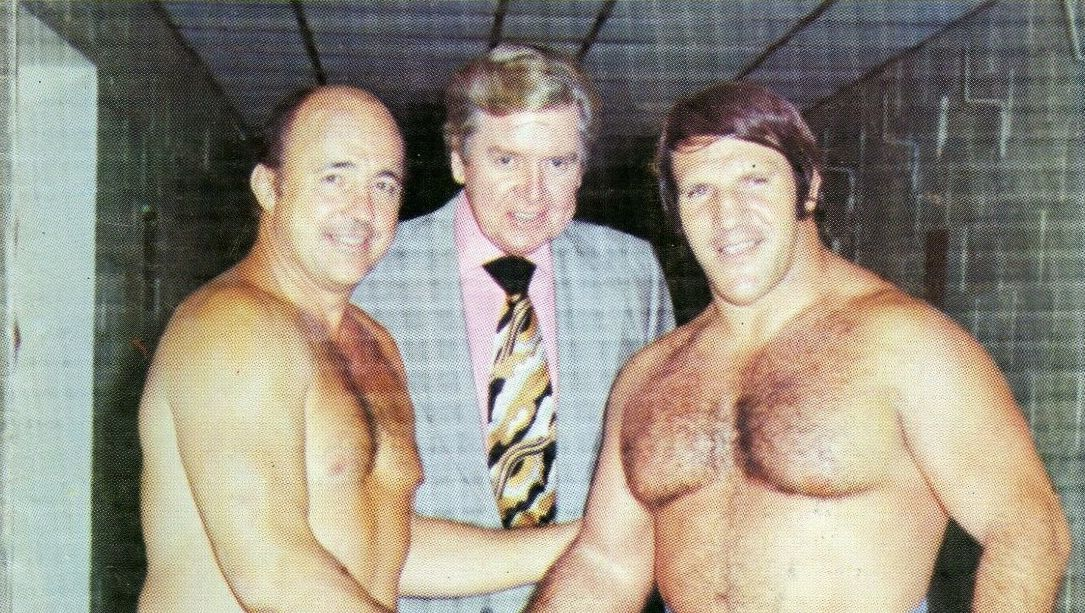
Gagne with WWWF promoter Vincent J. McMahon and his perennial world champion Bruno Sammartino

As AWA head, Gagne was known for putting on an "old school" show. He sought out wrestlers with amateur backgrounds over the larger, more impressive-looking wrestlers who dominated professional wrestling in the 1980s. This led to a problem with his biggest draw, Hulk Hogan, whom Gagne had acquired after Hogan had been let go by the World Wide Wrestling Federation and who Gagne also felt was not championship material, due to the fact that Hogan was a power wrestler rather than a technical wrestler. Seeing Hogan as the company's top draw, Gagne did, however, let Hogan feud with Bockwinkel.

Eventually, as noted on the 2006 Spectacular Legacy of AWA DVD, Gagne agreed to make Hogan his champion after Hogan's feud with Bockwinkel ran its course in April 1983, but only on condition that Gagne would receive the bulk of Hogan's revenues from both merchandise sales and his matches in Japan, which Hogan refused. In late 1983, Hogan accepted an offer from Vincent K. McMahon to return to the WWF. The Iron Sheik, whom Gagne trained, alleged that Gagne bribed him to inflict career-threatening damage on Hogan's knee after it became apparent that Hogan was leaving for the WWF. What followed was an exodus of major stars from various territories and promotions, including Gagne's AWA, to the WWF. McMahon wished to take his promotion "national" and do away with the traditional territorial system that dominated the North American pro wrestling landscape for decades.

Unlike most of his contemporaries, by the mid-1980s, Gagne began promoting the AWA beyond the geographical bounds of its traditional territory. In September 1985, ESPN began broadcasting AWA Championship Wrestling, giving the promotion national exposure like the WWF. However, the AWA suffered numerous setbacks. ESPN did not treat AWA Championship Wrestling as a priority; the show was sometimes not aired in its regular time slot (occasionally ESPN would change the time slot without advertising the change beforehand), and sometimes it was preempted by live sporting events. This resulted in many fans being unable to tune in on a regular basis. Gagne's booking strategies for the wrestlers themselves continued to follow more traditional themes than those of the WWF, believing as he did that the top stars should be highly gifted technical wrestlers rather than those with just charismatic personalities. Throughout the mid to late 1980s, the AWA would lose the vast majority of its top stars to McMahon, while ratings and live attendance continued to decline. By 1991, the damage had been done, and the AWA shut down after 30 years. Gagne would eventually end up in bankruptcy court.

== Wrestling Halls of Fame ==
In April 2006, Gagne was inducted into the WWE Hall of Fame by his son, Greg Gagne. He is one of only seven people to be inducted into the WWE, WCW and Professional Wrestling Halls of Fame.

In 2018, he was inducted into the Nebraska Pro Wrestling Hall of Fame.

== Later years, illness, and death ==
On January 26, 2009, Gagne got into an altercation with Helmut Gutmann, a 97-year-old resident of the Bloomington, Minnesota nursing care facility where they both resided. According to Gutmann's widow, who was not present during the altercation, Gagne picked Gutmann up and threw him to the floor, then broke his hip by pulling back on his body before applying the sleeper hold. Neither man had any recollection of the incident. Gutmann was admitted to the hospital, and died on February 14 from complications of the injury; on February 25, 2009, his death was officially ruled a homicide by the Hennepin County medical examiner's office.

In the wake of Gutmann's death, it was reported that Gagne had been diagnosed with Alzheimer's disease– which may have been a result of chronic traumatic encephalopathy from a lifetime of head injuries– and was living in the memory-loss section of the care facility. As a result of his condition, on March 12, 2009, the Hennepin County prosecutor's office announced that Gagne would not be charged with Gutmann's murder because he lacked the mental capacity to commit such a crime.

After Gutmann's death, Gagne was withdrawn from the healthcare facility; by 2012, he was living in the home of his daughter Beth and her husband Will. He also continued to make public appearances in his last years, aided by his son Greg.

On April 27, 2015, Gagne died in Bloomington at the age of 89.

== Championships and accomplishments ==
=== Amateur wrestling ===
- Amateur Athletic Union
  - Northwestern AAU Championship (1942)
- Big Ten Conference
  - Big Ten Conference Championship (1944, 1947, 1948, 1949)
- Minnesota State High School League
  - Minnesota State Championship (1943)
- National Collegiate Athletic Association
  - NCAA Championship (1948, 1949)
- Olympic Games
  - Alternate Member of 1948 United States Olympic Team
- Robbinsdale High School's Athletic Hall of Fame
  - Inaugural Class (2013)

=== Professional wrestling ===
- Cauliflower Alley Club
  - Lou Thesz Award (2006)
  - Other honoree (1993)
- Fred Kohler Enterprises
  - NWA United States Heavyweight Championship (Chicago version) (2 time)
  - NWA World Tag Team Championship (Chicago version) (1 time) – with Edouard Carpentier
- George Tragos/Lou Thesz Professional Wrestling Hall of Fame
  - Class of 1999
- International Pro Wrestling
  - IWA World Heavyweight Championship (1 time)
- International Professional Wrestling Hall of Fame
  - Class of 2023
- International Wrestling Association (Montreal)
  - IWA International Heavyweight Championship (1 time)
- NWA Minneapolis Wrestling and Boxing Club / American Wrestling Association
  - AWA World Heavyweight Championship (10 times)
  - AWA World Tag Team Championship (4 times) – with Moose Evans (1), The Crusher (1), Billy Robinson (1), and Mad Dog Vachon (1)
  - NWA World Tag Team Championship (Minneapolis version) (4 times) – with Bronko Nagurski (1), Leo Nomellini (2), and Butch Levy (1)
  - World Heavyweight Championship (Omaha version) (5 times)
  - AWA United States Heavyweight Championship (2 times)
  - Nebraska Tag Team Championship (1 time) – with Tex McKenzie
- NWA Tri-State
  - NWA World Junior Heavyweight Championship (1 time)
- New Japan Pro-Wrestling
  - Greatest 18 Club inductee
- Pro Wrestling Illustrated
  - Stanley Weston Award (1986)
  - PWI ranked him No. 158 of the 500 best singles wrestlers during the "PWI Years" in 2003
- Professional Wrestling Hall of Fame
  - Class of 2004
- Southwest Sports, Inc.
  - NWA Texas Heavyweight Championship (2 times)
  - NWA World Tag Team Championship (Texas version) (1 time) – with Wilbur Snyder
- Tokyo Sports
  - Match of the Year Award (1981) vs. Giant Baba on January 18
- World Championship Wrestling
  - WCW Hall of Fame (Class of 1993)
- World Wrestling Entertainment
  - WWE Hall of Fame (Class of 2006)
- Wrestling Observer Newsletter
  - Wrestling Observer Newsletter Hall of Fame (Class of 1996)
