= Luther Lindsay =

American professional wrestler (1924–1972)

Personal information
- Born: Luther Jacob Goodall; December 30, 1924 Norfolk, Virginia, U.S.
- Died: February 21, 1972 (aged 47) Charlotte, North Carolina, U.S.
- Cause of death: Myocardial infarction

Professional wrestling career
- Ring name(s): Luther Lindsay; Luther Lindsey
- Billed height: 5 ft 8 in (1.73 m)
- Billed weight: 227 lb (103 kg)
- Billed from: Norfolk, Virginia; Los Angeles, California
- Trained by: Stu Hart
- Debut: c. 1951

Luther Jacob Goodall (December 30, 1924 – February 21, 1972) was an American professional wrestler, known by his ringname Luther Lindsay or Lindsey, who competed throughout the United States with the National Wrestling Alliance as well as international promotions such as All Japan Pro Wrestling, Joint Promotions and Stampede Wrestling.

One of the first African American wrestlers to become a major star, he was extremely popular in the Pacific Northwest and Mid-Atlantic territory. A frequent rival and tag team partner of Shag Thomas, he also teamed with Bearcat Wright, Nick Bockwinkel, Pepper Gomez and was involved in feuds with "Iron" Mike DiBiase, Mad Dog Vachon, Beauregarde, Moondog Mayne, Tony Borne and Pat Patterson and The Hangman.

For much of the early 1950s and '60s, Lindsay was billed as the U.S. Colored (or Negro) Heavyweight Champion and took part in the first interracial professional wrestling matches held in the United States. Between 1953 and 1956, he faced NWA World Heavyweight Champion Lou Thesz in a series of matches. Although largely resulting in time limit draws, he was the first African-American to make a challenge to the title and earned Thesz's respect during these bouts publicly praising his wrestling ability.

He was considered one of the top submission wrestlers of his day working with Don Leo Jonathan and Stu Hart. Lindsay was one of the few men who bested him in the infamous "Hart Dungeon" and later became one of Hart's best friends. Hart reportedly carried a picture of him in his wallet until his death. He was held in high regard by his fellow wrestlers such as Lou Thesz, J. J. Dillon, Rip Hawk and Les Thatcher.

== Career ==
=== Early career ===
Luther Goodall was born on a farm outside Norfolk, Virginia, on December 30, 1924. He moved to Sedalia but later resided in Gibsonville, North Carolina, and later played college football for Norfolk State and nearby Hampton Institute where he was also a CIAA wrestling champion. Although excelling in athletics as an All-American Negro tackle-guard, state segregation laws prohibited him from playing against white athletes. Lindsey began wrestling professionally making his debut in 1950 or 1951. Taking the surname of his wife, Gertrude Lindsey, his earliest recorded match was against Al Tucker in Chicago, Illinois, for promoter Leonard Schwartz on November 21, 1951.

As early as 1953, Lindsay was billed as the U.S. Colored or Negro Heavyweight Champion. He was one of the few African-Americans in professional wrestling and, in accordance with state segregation laws at the time, he was only allowed to travel with and compete against other African-American wrestlers during his early career. One of his most frequent opponents was Shag Thomas who he later claimed knew better than any other opponent. During the late 1950s, he became the first African-American south of Washington, D.C., to compete in a wrestling event when he faced Ron Wright in Kingsport, Tennessee. Although the National Guard was brought in amid fears of rioting, the crowd unexpectedly favored Lindsay against Wright. As a result of Lindsay's success in the area, other African-American wrestlers were also brought into the area such as Bearcat Wright and Bobcat Brown.

=== Pacific Northwest Wrestling ===
In early 1953, he appeared in Washington where he faced George Dusette, the Masked Marvel, Carl Engstrom, Walter Kameroff, Jack Kiser, Bronko Lubich, Axel Cadier. He was involved in a battle royal which included Kiser, Lubich, Cadier, Bud Rattal and Paul DeGalles in Yakima on May 12. On July 31, he faced Lou Thesz for the NWA World Heavyweight Championship in Tacoma and the two fought to a time limit draw. This was the first of several meetings between the two champions and the first time the title was defended against an African-American opponent. A rematch one week later in Tacoma also resulted in a draw.

On October 10, Lindsay defeated Bronko Nagurski in a best 2-of-3 match during the main event at the Tacoma Armory. Nagurski had pinned him after a series of flying tackles and a full body press, however Lindsay recovered to score the second fall after making Nagurski submit to a neckbreaker. Lindsay was eventually awarded the match when referee Freddie Steele disqualified Nagurski after refusing to break a hold. According to promoter Paavo Ketonen, the winner was to receive a title shot against Lou Thesz for the NWA World Heavyweight Championship.

He was one of several wrestlers who challenged the Seattle Ramblers to a football game known as the "Muscle Bowl" at Lincoln Bowl on October 11. The event was attended by 7,265 fans and was successful in raising as much as $5,000 for the Associated Boys' Clubs of the Tacoma-area. Among the wrestlers who participated, a half-dozen were former collegiate football stars including Lindsay, Pepper Gomez and Frank Stojack. Bronko Nagurski also participated in a dozen plays. Other wrestlers included Ivan Kameroff, the Masked Marvel, Dr. John Gallagher, The Ram, Abe Yourist and Glen Detton. Despite the addition of several players loaned by the Seattle Ramblers, most notably Mel Light, they lost the game 20–6. Lindsay injured his right pinky finger during the game, however the wrestlers later celebrated at Steve's Restaurant.

On October 16, he took part in a 7-man battle royal involving Don Kindred, Bronko Nagurski, Dale Kiser, "Red" Vagnone, Jack O'Reilly, Jack Kiser and the eventual winner Carl Engstrom. Lindsay was the fifth man eliminated in the battle royal and, that same night, fought Jack O'Reilly to a draw. He faced Lou Thesz again in a series of matches during late-November. Their first meeting in Tacoma, on November 24, resulted in another draw however he lost to Thesz in Tacoma on November 27 and in Eugene the next night.

On January 10, he won his first major title winning the vacant NWA Hawaii Tag Team Championship with Bobby Burns in Honolulu. He faced Thesz again the following spring where they fought to another draw in Portland on April 29 and Seattle on April 1, 1954. On April 9, he lost to Thesz via disqualification in Yakima.

Later that year, he toured Northern Ontario with Ricky Waldo and The Black Panther. He and Jack Claybourne won the NWA Canadian Open Tag Team titles from Tosh Togo and Pat Fraley (substituting for Great Togo) in Toronto on September 28. Later that year, he wrestled for promoter Ed Don George making occasional appearances at Buffalo Memorial Auditorium where he faced Johnny Molinda, Danno O'Shocker and Danny Malone during the next two months.

They lost the titles to Ivan and Karol Kalmikoff in Toronto on December 9. The following night he fought Danno O'Shocker to a draw at the Buffalo Memorial Auditorium. This was his last match in the Buffalo area.

During the summer of 1955, he and George Dusette won the NWA Pacific Northwest Tag Team Championship from Bulldog Curtis and Tommy Martinez on May 15. While still defending the tag team titles, he fought Lou Thesz to another draw in Portland on June 8. He and Dusette eventually lost the titles to Doug Donovan and Ivan Kameroff on June 11.

=== NWA Texas ===
Later that year, Lindsay was brought to Texas by promoter Morris Siegel. As the state began complying with national de-segregation laws, Sigel promoted the first interracial wrestling match in the state pitting Lindsay against Duke Keomuka in one of the biggest matches of the year. Lindsay would also face Lou Thesz in Dallas on September 20, 1955, in yet another draw.

In January 1956, he entered the Dallas-Fort Worth area then promoted by Ed McLemore. On January 10, he faced Duke Keomuka in a best 2-of-3 falls match at The Sportatorium. Although taking the first pinfall, Keomuka pinned Lindsay with the help of outside interference by Tiny Mills. When referee Roy Carter was knocked unconscious outside the ring, wrestler Danny McShain made the count after Lindsay pinned Keomuka. Although controversial, the third fall was granted to Lindsay by referee decision.

A week later, Lindsay met Keomuka in a best 3-of-5 falls match which stipulated that their cornermen, Danny McShain and Tiny Mills, were to be locked in cages to prevent outside interference. However, both men broke out of their cages during the match and began brawling in the ring. The four men were broken up by referees Ray Gunkel and Otto Kuss who were forced to declare a no-contest. Later during the main event between McShain and Mills, Lindsay appeared to help McShain in his match. He and McShain later took on Duke Keomuka and Tiny Mills for the NWA Texas Tag Team Championship in a best-of-3 falls match at The Sportatorium on January 24. He and McShain lost the third fall by disqualification when Lindsay threw Mills over the top rope.

He returned to the area four months later teaming with Pepper Gomez in a best 2-of-3 falls match against "Iron" Mike DiBiase and Danny Plechas as one of a series of matches for the vacant NWA Texas Tag Team titles on May 22. Plechas pinned Gomez for the third fall and, despite an argument for the match to be awarded to Gomez and Lindsay, Mike DiBiase and Danny Plechas were declared the winners.

Both teams claimed the title however and a rematch was scheduled several days later. He and Gomez were forced to forfeit the match when Lindsay injured his leg during the match. Both Lindsay and Gomez faced Mike and Danny Plechas in singles matches later that night. Lindsay defeated Danny Plechas via disqualification when his partner interfered. Gomez lost his bout with Mike DiBiase when he was counted out.

He was scheduled to face Duke Keomuka in the opening rounds of a tournament to meet NWA World Heavyweight Champion Lou Thesz. However, reportedly flying in from Canada, his plane was grounded due to bad weather and was substituted by Tex Brady. Defeating Duke Keomuka on December 11, Lindsay earned a title shot at then NWA World Heavyweight Champion Lou Thesz. In his tenth meeting with Thesz, the two met in a best 2-of-3 falls match at The Sportatorium on December 18. Thesz scored the first pinfall and, while Lindsay rallied to take the second, Thesz took the third fall for the victory. According to The Dallas Morning News, Lindsay posted a $5,000 guarantee to face Thesz. He again met Thesz in Houston where they fought to another draw on January 20. Later that year, he also fought to a draw with newly crowned NWA World Heavyweight Champion Whipper Billy Watson in Dayton, Ohio, on October 25, 1956. Years later while in Calgary, Watson would refuse to face him.

=== Martinez and McMahon ===
In late 1957, Lindsay wrestled for promoter Pedro Martinez in Fort Erie, Ontario. Fighting to a draw with Wally Greb on September 21, Lindsay defeated Wild Bill Austin that same day in Buffalo. He later fought to draws with Joe Blanchard and Tiger Tasker. On December 17, he lost to NWA World Heavyweight Champion Dick Hutton in Dallas.

In early 1959, he appeared in the Capitol Wrestling Corporation for Vince McMahon, Sr. and Toots Mondt where he faced Chris Tolos, Emile Duprée and Hard Boiled Haggerty.

=== Stampede Wrestling ===
In 1960, Lindsay began wrestling for Calgary-based Stampede Wrestling. Feuding with Don Leo Jonathan during his first few weeks in the promotion, he defeated Jonathan at the Sales Pavilion in Edmonton on March 29. Two days later, he also beat Mighty Ursus at the Exhibition Auditorium in Regina. On April 15, he and Oattem Fisher defeated John Foti and Don Kindred for the Stampede International Tag Team Championship at the Victoria Pavilion. While defending the titles with Oattem Fisher, he also teamed with Tarzan Tourville who faced Mighty Ursus, Emile Koverly, Kit Fox, Jim Wright and Gypsy Joe. He and Fisher returned to the Victoria Pavilion defeated Don Kindred and Kit Fox on May 13. During the next two months, he faced Pat O'Connor for the NWA World Heavyweight Championship in Edmonton, Calgary and Regina four times.

Later that year, he returned to the Capitol Wrestling Corporation. On October 1, he defeated Swede Hanson at Madison Square Garden. Teaming with Eugenio Marin against Pat and Al Smith two weeks later, he also faced Fritz Wallick the following night. On October 24, he and Rebel II fought to a draw. He and Mr. Puerto Rico teamed up against the Dixie Rebels (Rebel I and Rebel II) on November 14, but lost the match. After a match with Tony Marino in Westchester, New York, Lindsay left the territory.

=== Return to Portland ===
The following year, he won the NWA Pacific Northwest Heavyweight Championship from "Iron" Mike DiBiase on May 26 as well as the NWA Pacific Northwest Tag Team titles with Bing Ki Lee and Herb Freeman during the summer. On September 25, he lost the NWA Pacific Northwest Heavyweight title to Nikolai Volkoff. Later that year, he traveled to Great Britain. Although his stay was brief, he scored an impressive KO victory over Mike Marino at the Royal Albert Hall and Josef Zaranoff in a later televised match.

In early 1962, he toured Japan with All Japan Pro Wrestling where he and Ricky Waldo defeated Toyonobori and Rikidōzan for the All Asia Tag Team Championship on February 3, 1962. After losing the titles back to the former champions, he returned to the United States where he met and lost to NWA World Heavyweight Champion "Nature Boy" Buddy Rogers in Seattle on June 18. He teamed with longtime rival Shag Thomas to regain the NWA Pacific Northwest Tag Team titles defeating Kurt Von Poppenheim and Fritz Von Goering on July 21. Defeating Fritz Von Goering for the NWA Pacific Northwest Heavyweight title on August 24, he and Thomas would also regain the tag team titles four more times together between 1962 and 1964. He later lost the NWA Pacific Northwest title to Mad Dog Vachon on October 4, 1962. He also faced Pat Patterson and Dean Ho during their first stints in Portland defeating them both in two matches each.

He and Shag Thomas regained the NWA Pacific Northwest Tag Team titles defeating Ivan Kameroff and Soldat Gorky on July 24, 1963. He and Thomas successfully defended the titles against Soldat Gorky and Dean Ho on August 9. He defeated Dean Ho in a singles match at the end of the month. On September 2, he also teamed with Danny Hodge to defeat Dean Ho and The Destroyer. Several days later, Lindsay became involved in a car accident when he smashed his car into a utility pole to avoid hitting another vehicle. Escaping from the car, he was picked up by passing motorist who brought him to a local hospital for "emergency surgery". He was replaced by Hodge and lost the tag team titles to The Destroyer and Art Michalik in Salem on September 9, 1963.

He and Thomas managed to regain the titles on January 15 although they eventually lost the titles back to The Destroyer and Art Michalik on January 22. Lindsay left the territory soon after.

=== From Honolulu to Portland ===
During a brief stint in 50th State Big Time Wrestling, he enjoyed a brief reign as NWA Hawaii United States Heavyweight Champion before losing the title back to King Curtis P. Iaukea in June 1964. On July 28, 1964, Lindsay was part of an 18-man battle royal which featured Gene Kiniski, Tosh Togo, Mr. Moto and King Curtis Iaukea. This event was later aired on the first episode of Big Time Wrestling, a weekly television show which broadcast the first wrestling matches from the Honolulu International Center, and was attended by over 14,000 fans (5,300 of these watched the event live at the Civic Auditorium). The following night, he appeared in the main event against Curtis Iaukea for the NWA Hawaii United States Championship which sold out the Civic Arena.

He returned to the Pacific Northwest later that year and was one of several tag team partners of Pepper Martin. On October 26, he and Pepper Martin defeated Pat Patterson and The Hangman for the NWA Pacific Northwest Tag Team titles. He and Martin successfully defended the titles against Pat Patterson and Don Manoukian and they re-lost the titles to Pat Patterson and The Hangman in Portland on September 18. Lindsay and Martin continued to feud with the tag team champions defeating Patterson and El Shereef by disqualification on September 21 and El Shereef, Patterson and The Hangman in a 6-man tag team match with Dean Ho on October 5.

He and Martin continued to pursue Pat Patterson and The Hangman defeating them on October 26, however they lost to them twice the following month. He and Dean Ho also lost to Haru Sasaki and The Hangman on November 10. After defeating them on November 20, Lindsay faced Pat Patterson in a singles match and fought him to a draw on December 4. After defeating El Shereef, Patterson and The Hangman in another 6-man tag team match on December 10, he defeated Pat Patterson in a singles match the following night.

In early 1965, he was one of several African-American wrestlers to tour the Continental Wrestling Association with Sailor Art Thomas, King Toby and Tiger Conway, Sr. However, with segregation still in practice in the Memphis territory, they only faced each other in matches. In Honolulu, he fought to another draw against NWA Heavyweight Champion Lou Thesz in Honolulu on May 7, 1965.

Although teaming with Dean Ho for a time, he and Bearcat Wright defeated Enrique and Alberto Torres for the NWA Hawaii Tag Team Championship on July 28. He also regained the NWA Hawaii United States Heavyweight Championship from King Curtis Iaukea on September 29, 1965. Lindsay and Wright successfully defended the titles against Pat Patterson and Ray "The Crippler" Stevens, as well as a tag team match with Neff Miavia on December 22, before eventually losing the tag team titles to Ripper Collins and Johnny Barend on January 4, 1966. He also lost the heavyweight title to Ron Reed the following night. This would be the only meeting between the two. Between March 16-April 6, 1966, he faced Dale Lewis, Dick the Bruiser and Beauregarde all resulting in draws.

=== Mid-Atlantic Championship Wrestling ===
Lindsay joined a number of other African-American wrestlers in the Mid-Atlantic territory for promoter Jim Crockett and, during a televised match at the television studio in late 1966, an incident between Lindsey and Ike Eakins caused WDBJ to cancel Crockett's weekly television show All Star Wrestling. Eakins reportedly used a racial slur about Lindsay. Management at WDBJ said if Eakins did not apologize on the air the next week, they would throw the show off the air. Reportedly Eakins came out and instead of apologizing, he used the slur again and that was the last wrestling show recorded at WDBJ. However, Lindsay remained in the promotion defeating Pedro Godoy in Roanoke, Virginia on January 31, 1967.

On June 2, he won the NWA Pacific Northwest Heavyweight title from Tony Borne before losing the title to Moondog Mayne weeks later. Defeating Gene Dundee at Park Center in Charlotte, North Carolina, on August 7, Lindsay also made an appearance for the World Wide Wrestling Federation defeating Matt Jewell, sometimes billed as the Negro Men's Southern Heavyweight Champion, in Memphis, Tennessee, on October 30, 1967. That same year, he defeated Stan Stasiak for the NWA Canadian Heavyweight title.

He and Abe Jacobs teamed up for a match against Pancho Valdez and The Matador in Lexington, North Carolina, on July 6, 1968. Back in PNW, he and Dean Ho lost to NWA Pacific Northwest Tag Team Champions Moondog Mayne and Beauregard in Portland on September 19. He also fought to draw against NWA Heavyweight Champion Lou Thesz in Salem on September 20. He won the NWA Pacific Northwest Heavyweight title from Beauregard, substituting for Moondog Mayne, on November 30, 1968. Lindsay and Dean Ho also teamed up to defeat NWA Pacific Northwest Tag Team Champions Kurt and Karl Von Steiger via disqualification on December 21, 1968. He also teamed with Shag Thomas again to defeat the Von Steigers for the NWA Pacific Northwest Tag Team titles on February 15, 1969. Lindsay re-lost the title to Moondog Mayne on April 12. Later that same year he worked for International Wrestling Enterprise in Japan.

During early 1970, Luther Lindsay faced the original Minnesota Wrecking Crew (Gene and Ole Anderson) teaming with a number of wrestlers such as George Scott, Abe Jacobs and Randy Curtis. Later that year, he teamed with Curtis as well as Sandy Scott and Bob Ramstad against Gene Anderson and Chris Tolos who filled in for the injured Ole Anderson for a time. He and Gene Anderson eventually met in a singles match fighting to a time limit draw in Greenville, South Carolina, on December 25, 1970. Two months later, he faced NWA World Heavyweight Champion Dory Funk, Jr. in Norfolk on February 4, 1971. Lindsay scored a string of victories the following spring defeating Art Nelson, Bill Bowman, Bobby Paul, Frank Morrell and Johnny Heidman within a six-week period. Despite losing a rematch to Frank Morrell in Charleston, South Carolina, on February 11, he and Frank Hester defeated Joe Soto and Tony Romano in Raleigh, North Carolina, the following week.

=== Death ===
On the night of February 21, 1972, Lindsay was facing local wrestler Bobby Paul at Park Center in Charlotte. Only ten minutes into the match, Lindsay pinned his opponent with a diving belly-flop. He apparently suffered a fatal heart attack when he made the pin and died on top of his opponent.

When Lindsay did not respond to the referee after scoring the pinfall, the police were called. Lindsay was taken back to the dressing room where he was declared dead shortly thereafter. His body was kept at his old alma mater, Hampton Institute, for a week before his burial. His funeral was attended by several well-known wrestlers including Les Thatcher who was one of the pallbearers. On March 31, 2017, Lindsay was posthumously inducted into the WWE Hall of Fame as a part of the Legacy wing.

== Championships and accomplishments ==
- 50th State Big Time Wrestling
  - NWA Hawaii Heavyweight Championship (1 time)
  - NWA Hawaii Tag Team Championship (2 times) - with Bobby Bruns (1) and Bearcat Wright (1)
  - NWA United States Heavyweight Championship (Hawaii version) (1 time)
- All Japan Pro Wrestling
  - All Asia Tag Team Championship (1 time) - with Ricky Waldo
- George Tragos/Lou Thesz Professional Wrestling Hall of Fame
  - Class of 2009
- Maple Leaf Wrestling
  - NWA Canadian Open Tag Team Championship (1 time) - with Jack Claybourne
- National Wrestling Alliance
  - World Negro Heavyweight Championship (1 time)
  - NWA United States Heavyweight Championship (Central States Version) (1 time)
- Pacific Northwest Wrestling
  - NWA Pacific Northwest Heavyweight Championship (1 time)
  - NWA Pacific Northwest Tag Team Championship (10 times) - with George Dussette (1), Bing Ki Lee (1), Herb Freeman (1), Shag Thomas (5) and Pepper Martin (2)
- Professional Wrestling Hall of Fame
  - Class of 2017
- Ring Around The Northwest Newsletter
  - Tag Team of the Year (1961) with Herb Freeman
- Stampede Wrestling
  - NWA Canadian Heavyweight Championship (Calgary version) (1 time)
  - NWA International Tag Team Championship (Calgary version) (1 time) - with Oattem Fisher
  - NWA Canadian Tag Team Championship (Calgary version) (1 time) - with Ray Villmer
  - Stampede Wrestling Hall of Fame (Class of 1995)
- WWE
  - WWE Hall of Fame (Class of 2017)

== See also ==
- List of premature professional wrestling deaths
