= NWA United States Heavyweight Championship =

Secondary wrestling championship

The NWA United States Heavyweight Championship is a name used for several secondary championships used by various National Wrestling Alliance (NWA) members since 1953. At least twelve different versions of the NWA United States Heavyweight Championships have been promoted in various regions across the United States. The NWA's bylaws allowed any NWA member, also known as an NWA territory, to create and control their own version of the NWA United States Heavyweight Championship. The most well known version was the Mid-Atlantic Wrestling version, which became the Undisputed United States Championship in 1981 after the San Francisco-based NWA territory ceased operations, leaving the Mid-Atlantic version as the only remaining United States Championship. The Mid-Atlantic version later became the WCW United States Heavyweight Championship, and is still active as the WWE United States Championship.

== History ==
The National Wrestling Alliance (NWA) was founded in 1948 after six professional wrestling promoters decided to join together and form a governing body to oversee the various members, later referred to as the NWA territories. The NWA Board of Directors agreed to all recognize one over all NWA World Heavyweight Championship and one NWA World Junior Heavyweight Championship across all promotions. Beyond those two championships the Board allowed each promotion to create and promote whatever championship they wanted to. For example, in 1949 the first of many NWA World Tag Team Championships was created in the Los Angeles territory.

The earliest version of the NWA United States Heavyweight championship was promoted by Fred Kohler Enterprises. It was known as the Chicago version from 1953 until 1959 and was later known as the Detroit version from 1959 until 1980. Various versions of an "American" or "United States" title had existed going back to 1881. The Detroit version was the primary singles championship within the NWA Detroit promotion. Over the course of its existence, the title was held by well known names such as Bobo Brazil, The Sheik, Wilbur Snyder, Johnny Valentine, and multi-time AWA World Heavyweight Champions Verne Gagne and Dick the Bruiser. At around the same time, a version of the US title was established in the Rocky Mountains territory. First held by Gagne, it lasted until 1961. Five years later in 1958, a version was established in St Joseph with Gagne again as inaugural champion, lasted nearly a decade until it was last claimed by former World champion Lou Thesz in 1967.

Five more versions were created of the title in the early 1960s. Prior to Capitol Wrestling leaving the National Wrestling Alliance and becoming the WWWF, the company hosted a version of the championship for several months in 1960-1961. The only holder of this title was Buddy Rogers, who vacated the title upon winning the NWA World title from Pat O'Connor in Chicago in June 1961. (The WWWF subsequently hosted its own United States Heavyweight Championship from 1963 to 1976.) Over the next three years, versions were also established in the Central States, Hawaii, San Francisco and Toronto territories. The Central States version was defended in the Central States Wrestling territory around Missouri. It existed from 1961 until 1968. The Hawaiian version was first held by Nick Bockwinkel in 1962 and became the North American title in 1968. The San Francisco version was defended in NWA San Francisco and, later, Big Time Wrestling. The title, which originated as the American Wrestling Alliance United States Championship and was renamed in 1968, existed from 1960 until 1981. The Toronto version was defended in Frank Tunney's Toronto-based Maple Leaf Wrestling. It existed from 1962 until 1973 when the title was vacated by champion Tiger Jeet Singh after several years of intermittent activity.

In 1966, Texas promoter/wrestler Jack Adkisson (aka Fritz Von Erich) instituted a version of the title for his promotion, World Class Championship Wrestling (WCCW). Von Erich himself mostly held this title apart from losses to Johnny Valentine, Brute Bernard and The Spoiler. The title was renamed the NWA American Heavyweight Championship in May 1968. Later, when WCCW pulled out of the NWA in 1986, the championship was renamed the World Class Wrestling Association World Heavyweight Championship. The title was briefly unified by Jerry Lawler with the AWA World Heavyweight Championship in 1988-1989 and continued as the USWA Unified World Heavyweight Championship until the demise of the USWA in 1997.

The most well known version of the championship to have existed is the Mid-Atlantic version. It was created by and defended in Mid-Atlantic Championship Wrestling (MACW) run by Jim Crockett Jr. Introduced on January 1, 1975, Harley Race became the inaugural champion. The title quickly replaced the NWA Mid-Atlantic Heavyweight Championship as the top singles title in the promotion. The Sheik, then-holder of the Detroit version of the title came to the Toronto territory in and 1974 and was awarded the local version of the title. He defended this as a separate title from his Detroit version, holding it until 1977 except for brief losses to Thunderbolt Patterson in late 1976 and Bobo Brazil in early 1977, after which Maple Leaf Wrestling recognized the Mid-Atlantic version of the title from May 1978 until July 1984 when promoter Jack Tunney allied himself with the WWF.

The closures of the Detroit and San Francisco territories in October 1980 and January 1981 spelled the end for each of their versions of the title, last held by The Sheik and Dusty Rhodes respectively. (The Sheik continued to claim the title in the Kentucky-based independent International Championship Wrestling in 1981-1984 and continued to wear the title belt for appearances in promotions such as the Tri-State Wrestling Alliance and FMW as late as the early 1990s.) This left the Mid-Atlantic version as the only version active in the NWA. The title remained the primary championship within the Mid-Atlantic territory until 1986 when Crockett gained control of the NWA World Heavyweight Championship. The United States title then became the secondary championship of the promotion. After Ted Turner bought the company and renamed it World Championship Wrestling (WCW) in November 1988, the title continued to be used and recognized as secondary to the World Championship.

WCW began to pull itself away from the NWA, demonstrated by the company changing the name of the title to the WCW United States Heavyweight Championship in January 1991. From the final break of WCW from the NWA in late 1993 until 2016 the only version of the title active in the NWA belonged to NWA Wildside which had a version of the title 1995-2005. Meanwhile, the former Mid Atlantic version was eventually acquired by the WWF in 2001 as part of its purchase of WCW. It was later unified with the WWF Intercontinental Championship in October 2001 before being relaunched as the WWE United States Heavyweight Championship in 2003. In February 2016, a new version of the title was established in Indiana, mostly held by bodybuilder and wrestler Josh Lewis. It has been vacant since Billy Corgan bought the NWA in October 2017.

== List of NWA United States Heavyweight Championships ==
- NWA United States Heavyweight Championship (Capitol Wrestling version)
- NWA United States Heavyweight Championship (Central States version)
- NWA United States Heavyweight Championship (Detroit version)
- NWA United States Heavyweight Championship (Hawaii version)
- NWA United States Heavyweight Championship (Indiana version)
- NWA United States Heavyweight Championship (Mid Atlantic version)
- NWA United States Heavyweight Championship (Rocky Mountains Version)
- NWA United States Heavyweight Championship (San Francisco version)
- NWA United States Heavyweight Championship (St. Joseph Version)
- NWA United States Heavyweight Championship (Texas version)
- NWA United States Heavyweight Championship (Toronto version)
- NWA United States Heavyweight Championship (Wildside version)

== See also ==
- List of National Wrestling Alliance championships
- NWA National Heavyweight Championship
- NWA Americas Heavyweight Championship
