= Freddie Blassie =

American professional wrestler and manager (1918–2003)

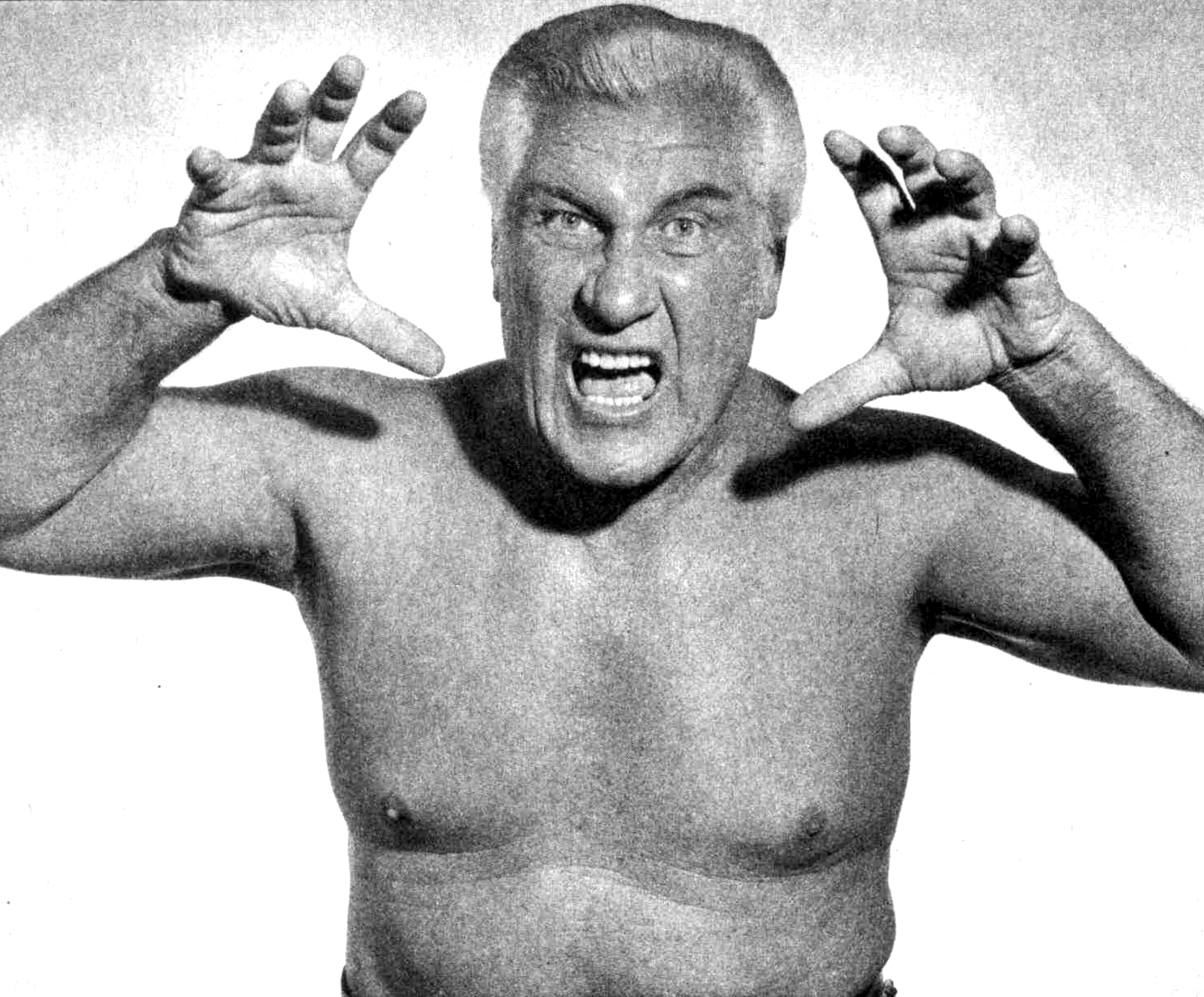
- Blassie, c. 1973

Personal information
- Born: Frederick Kenneth Blassie; February 8, 1918 St. Louis, Missouri, U.S.
- Died: June 2, 2003 (aged 85) Hartsdale, New York, U.S.

Professional wrestling career
- Ring name(s): Freddie Blassie; Blassie "Classy" Freddie Blassie; The Vampire "Sailor" Fred Blassie; The Hollywood Fashion Plate; The Fashion Plate of Professional Wrestling
- Billed height: 5 ft 10 in (178 cm)
- Billed weight: 220 lb (100 kg)
- Trained by: Billy Hanson
- Debut: 1935
- Retired: 1986
- Military service
- Allegiance: United States
- Branch: United States Navy
- Service years: 1942–1946
- Rank: Petty officer second class
- Conflicts: World War II (Pacific Theater)

Frederick Kenneth Blassie (February 8, 1918 – June 2, 2003) was an American professional wrestler and manager, known by the ring name "Classy" Freddie Blassie. His achievements in the ring included holding the Los Angeles-based World Wrestling Associates (WWA) world title four times. Renowned as "The Hollywood Fashion Plate", he was a one-time NWA World Junior Heavyweight Champion and was inducted into the WWF Hall of Fame in 1994. He is regarded as one of the greatest wrestling heels, or villains, of all time.

== Early life ==
Blassie was born Frederick Kenneth Blassie in St. Louis, Missouri, in 1918. His parents, Anna (née Szind) and Jacob Blassie (né Blaszi), were immigrants from Austria-Hungary who arrived in the United States in 1912 via Hamburg, Germany.

Frederick was an only child. His father was an abusive alcoholic, prompting Frederick to stay with his grandparents whenever Jacob beat Anna. His parents repeatedly separated, only to reconcile. At the age of 13, after Jacob had beaten Anna again, Frederick threatened his father with a baseball bat; instead, he lived with his aunt for six months until his mother asked him to return home. As an adult, Frederick was a teetotaler.

He graduated from McKinley High School and began work at a meatpacking plant. He also began boxing at a local community center and won a heavyweight championship title.

== Military service ==
After the United States entered World War II, Blassie enlisted in the Navy and served in the Pacific Theater for 42 months. He married a woman in California while on shore leave. He achieved the rank of Petty Officer (Second Class) before he was discharged.

== Professional wrestling career ==
=== Early career (1935–1942) ===
However, he became increasingly interested in wrestling. As the wrestlers became familiar with him, they began teaching him holds. His first public wrestling match was a shoot fight which he accepted hoping to impress a girl he brought to the show. Later, he received regular work wrestling at local carnivals. His cousin John Frank Holaus often refereed his matches.

Blassie's famous "pencil-neck geek" catchphrase originated early in his career while describing a fellow carnival performer who appeared in a freak show. Blassie described this performer as "having a neck like a stack of dimes and a real pencil-neck geek".

His career continued; he was hired by more established promoters, including Tom Packs in St. Louis and George Simpson in Kansas City. He was enlisted in the US Army in 1942, where he fought in World War II and left wrestling.

=== Return to Wrestling (1945–1952) ===
Upon Blassie's return from the war, he was billed as "Sailor" Fred Blassie to capitalize on the wave of war-time patriotism sweeping the country, but that gimmick was unsuccessful. He worked for Jack Pfefer, who he claimed would only employ people who looked like sideshow freaks at his shows, and whose wrestlers included Tor Johnson, who made movies with director Ed Wood, and Lillian Ellison, the Fabulous Moolah. During this time, he went to New York City to work for promoter Jess McMahon.

=== NWA Los Angeles (1952–1953) ===
In 1952, Blassie moved to Los Angeles to work for Jules Strongbow. He teamed with Billy McDaniel as the McDaniel Brothers, but when they went east, they were known as the Blassie Brothers.

=== Georgia Championship Wrestling (1953–1960) ===
In 1953, he worked in the Atlanta-based Georgia Championship Wrestling territory for Paul Jones (the wrestler of the 1930s, not the wrestler/manager of the 1980s). While there, he won the NWA Georgia Southern Heavyweight Championship, the holder of which was generally first in line to challenge the NWA World Heavyweight Champion whenever he passed through the territory. It was also during this period of his career when he dropped his babyface gimmick and became a full-fledged heel. The fans consistently booed him because he was considered a "Yankee". He also bleached his hair at this time, as many of the other stars of the era did, such as Gorgeous George, Johnny Valentine, and "Nature Boy" Buddy Rogers. He was often billed as "The Vampire" during this time for biting his opponents and filing his teeth during interviews and promos.

=== Worldwide Wrestling Associates (1960–1971) ===
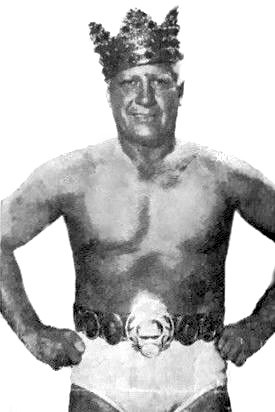
Blassie in the early 1960s

In 1960, Blassie returned to Strongbow's promotion in Los Angeles, where he was a big star for Worldwide Wrestling Associates (WWA) of southern California, drawing many fans to the Olympic Auditorium in Los Angeles. He was so hated there that uniformed police officers were regularly brought in to protect him as he made his way to and from the ring. He had main event-level feuds against stars such as The Destroyer.

On June 12, 1961, Blassie defeated the "Flying Frenchman" Édouard Carpentier in a best-of-three-falls match for his first WWA World Heavyweight Championship. On July 7, Blassie successfully defended his title against the former NWA World Heavyweight Champion Lou Thesz. During that same title reign, in a match against Lord James Blears a fan threw acid on his back, and he had to return immediately to the locker room to wash it off; over the course of his career, he was also stabbed 21 times and lost vision in his right eye after being struck by a thrown hard-boiled egg. Blassie lost the title to Rikidōzan on March 28, 1962.

Blassie claims that he made Regis Philbin into the celebrity he is today. When Philbin had a late-night weekend talk show in San Diego, Blassie would routinely show up to yell at the audience, throw furniture, and threaten Philbin; the confrontations were wholly kayfabe and both of them were friends when the cameras weren't rolling. In later years, Blassie also appeared on The Mike Douglas Show when Philbin was a guest host.

After regaining the WWA Championship from Rikidōzan on July 25, 1962, Blassie lost the title two days later to the "Masked Destroyer" Dick Beyer. In 1963, Bearcat Wright defeated him to become champion, and it was quite a statement during the fight for civil rights that an African-American had won such a title. In 1964, Dick the Bruiser defeated Blassie to become champion, and Blassie headed east to work for the World Wide Wrestling Federation (WWWF).

Blassie returned to WWA in 1968 just as promoter Mike LeBell decided to rejoin the NWA. In the early 1970s, Blassie "turned face", or became a good guy, since so many fans were cheering his famous antics. While there, he feuded with Soulman Rocky Johnson, The Sheik, and "The Golden Greek" John Tolos. One of his most famous feuds took place in southern California in 1971, against Tolos. The final match of their series took place in the Los Angeles Memorial Coliseum, and set new California records for both attendance and gate.

=== Japan (1962–1968) ===
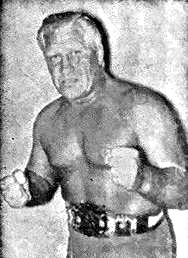
Blassie in 1962

In 1962, Blassie had a feud with Japanese wrestling icon Rikidōzan that established his reputation in Japan. After Blassie lost the WWA World Heavyweight Championship to Rikidōzan in Los Angeles, the two had a rematch on live Japanese television. Many of the viewers were horrified by Blassie's treatment of their hero. One of Blassie's gimmicks was to file his teeth, and draw blood from his opponents by biting their foreheads. The sight of the Japanese legend covered in his own blood gave several viewers heart attacks, and some reportedly died.

While touring Japan in 1965, and by this point divorced, Blassie met the woman who would eventually become his third wife, Miyako Morozumi, at a train station. However, later that year Blassie suffered from kidney stones and had surgery to remove them. While recuperating in 1966, he worked as a car salesman and married a second time to a woman whose name Blassie later claimed not to remember.

In 1968, Blassie returned to Japan and was reunited with Miyako. When he asked for her parents' blessing, they were hesitant because of his reputation with Rikidōzan and because he was 28 years older than her. However, they eventually consented and Miyako returned with Blassie to the United States; they were married on September 30, 1968.

=== World Wide Wrestling Federation (1964; 1971–1974) ===
In 1964, Blassie feuded with Bruno Sammartino and Bobo Brazil. Blassie came into the WWWF with his own world title belt, claiming to be the Pacific World Champion, and was coming to Sammartino's "back yard" to unify the world title. The series began at Roosevelt Stadium, Jersey City, New Jersey in 1964, with Blassie winning on a technicality, but not a pin. The rematches were held at Madison Square Garden in New York, with Sammartino winning out.

He returned to the company in 1971, reaching the final of a tournament in January for the vacant WWWF United States Heavyweight Championship before losing to Pedro Morales. Blassie later challenged Morales for the WWWF Championship, but came up short. During this stint with the company, Blassie was managed by his future fellow "Wise Man of the East" and eventual nemesis, "Captain" Lou Albano.

=== Return to Japan (1972–1974) ===
Blassie returned to Japan to work for both the newly All Japan Pro Wrestling in 1972. In 1974, he worked for New Japan Pro Wrestling.

=== Management career (1974–1986) ===
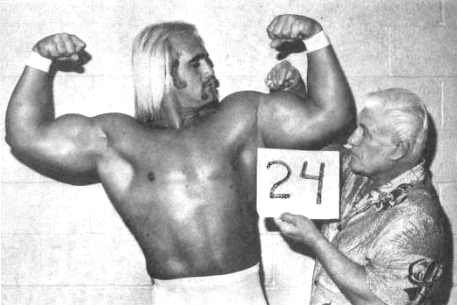
Blassie as Hulk Hogan's manager in 1980

Blassie retired from active wrestling in 1974, due to a California law that prohibited anyone over 55 from getting a wrestling license. His knees were also in terrible condition, which also contributed to his retirement. Afterwards he became a manager in the World Wide Wrestling Federation (WWWF) and its subsequent incarnation the World Wrestling Federation (WWF). He performed for that promotion until his full retirement from professional wrestling in 1986. Blassie, Lou Albano, and The Grand Wizard were named "The Three Wise Men of the East", as the top three heel managers in the company.

Among the wrestlers he managed were Nikolai Volkoff, The Iron Sheik, Blackjack Mulligan, High Chief Peter Maivia, "The Crippler" Ray Stevens, Adrian Adonis, Jesse Ventura, Dick Murdoch, Swede Hanson, Killer Khan, George 'The Animal' Steele, Professor Tanaka, Mr. Fuji, Ivan Koloff, Tor Kamata, Masa Saito, Lou Albano, Victor Rivera, Kamala, Hercules Hernandez, Louis Cyr, and Hulk Hogan. Blassie also managed Muhammad Ali in his boxer vs. wrestler match in 1976 against Antonio Inoki. Blassie also publicly represented Ali for media events and interviews for a period in the mid-1970s.

One of Blassie's most famous proteges was The Iron Sheik. Blassie led Sheik to the WWF World Heavyweight Championship over Bob Backlund on December 26, 1983, in Madison Square Garden. After Sheik lost the belt to Blassie's former managed wrestler Hulk Hogan, Blassie managed Sheik in various rematches around the country throughout the first half of 1984, culminating into another major televised rematch on December 28, 1984, once again in Madison Square Garden. In this match Hogan was once again victorious. After managing Sheik through a brief feud with Andre the Giant, he also became the manager of Nikolai Volkoff, with Sheik and Volkoff later becoming a tag team. Blassie would gain even more gold when Volkoff and Sheik defeated The US Express managed by Albano who had turned babyface in December 1984 to Blassie's kayfabe disgust, for the WWF Tag Team Championship at the first ever Wrestlemania. Blassie got involved when he threw his cane into the ring, with Sheik and Volkoff using it to their advantage to gain the victory. When Gene Okerlund confronted Blassie in an interview after the match, Blassie said, "what cane, I didn't have no cane!"

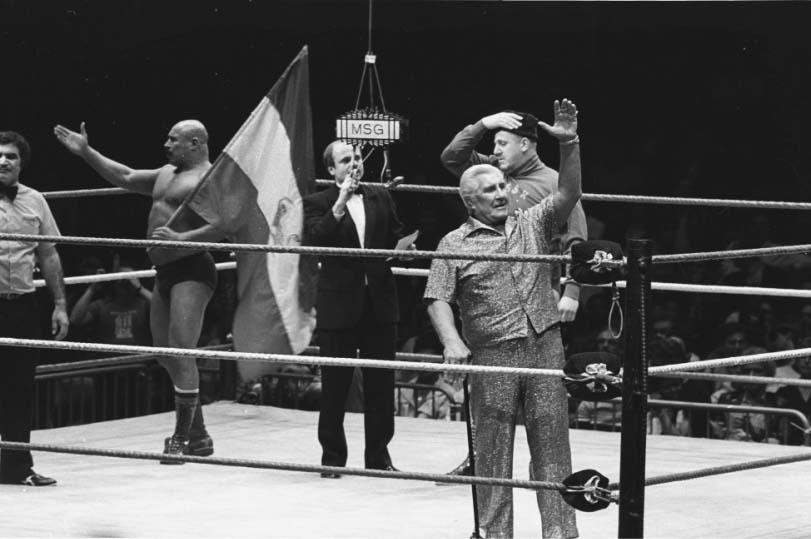
Blassie (right – foreground), with clients The Iron Sheik (left, holding flag) and Nikolai Volkoff (right – directly behind Blassie) during the mid-1980s at a Madison Square Garden event

Blassie continued to manage Sheik and Volkoff even after they lost the tag team titles. Blassie unsuccessfully campaigned along with the other managers to manage "Macho Man" Randy Savage when Savage first entered the WWF in June 1985. Blassie continued to interfere from ringside in matches, especially during Volkoff's feud with Corporal Kirchner. Blassie's interference at Wrestlemania 2 cost Volkoff his match with Kirchner, when the cane was grabbed by Kirchner instead of Volkoff. In the summer of 1986, Blassie started to slowly phase himself out of the WWF and into retirement.

On an episode of WWF Championship Wrestling, Blassie barged into the announcer booth to proclaim that he had sold half of the contracts of Sheik and Volkoff to a mysterious benefactor for a large sum of money. This benefactor was later revealed to be Slick. Blassie appeared alongside Slick to co-manage Sheik and Volkoff for a few television appearances before finally bowing out in November 1986, with Albano, the final member of the Three Wise Men, retiring a few weeks later.

=== Commentator career (1986–1990) ===
Because of his close relationship with Vince McMahon Sr. and his family, Blassie remained on the WWF payroll until the day he died. He sporadically returned to make brief appearances following his retirement in 1986, mostly in produced video packages hyping the "new generation" of wrestling. He was given a commentary tryout in 1986 and 1987 for WWF Wrestling Challenge, calling a few matches with Gorilla Monsoon. He briefly turned face in 1989, making an appearance on Prime Time Wrestling angry with Bobby Heenan over money Heenan hadn't paid him back. He returned again in 1990 briefly to do color commentary for Prime Time in April with Vince McMahon, as an emergency fill-in after Tony Schiavone quit, playing a heel once again.

=== Guest appearances and death (1994–2003) ===
Blassie was inducted into the WWF Hall of Fame in 1994 by Shane McMahon. In 1998, Blassie was the winner at the fourth annual Cauliflower Alley Club East Coast Banquet. In 1999, he was shown making the opening narration of WrestleMania XV. In 2000, Blassie made an appearance at the Royal Rumble as a judge in the Miss Rumble 2000 Swimsuit contest, which was won by Mae Young. Blassie also appeared in the SummerSlam 2000 opening video. In 2001, Blassie appeared in a special July 16, 2001 Raw is War segment for the Invasion storyline, wherein he exhorted a gathering of WWF wrestlers to stand tall against The Alliance – and later got mocked by Alliance leaders Shane and Stephanie McMahon. Because of this, Blassie is one of, if not the only man to have worked with all four generations of the McMahon family. Images from his WrestleMania XV promo were also included in the opening of the 2001 Survivor Series. Blassie also appeared in a segment at the Vengeance pay-per-view event in December 2001, where an "undisputed" champion would be crowned. His final wrestling appearance was on the May 12, 2003 in Philadelphia on Raw, three weeks before his death. The segment featured Blassie, his wife, and Raw co-General Manager Eric Bischoff, who was about to allow 3 Minute Warning to attack him, until Stone Cold Steve Austin and The Dudley Boyz stepped in. His final words on WWE television were "D-Von, get the table!", to a monstrous applause. His book, Listen You Pencil Neck Geeks, was released on May 13, 2003.

On June 2, 2003, Blassie died of heart and kidney failure at the age of 85. His death was announced by Jim Ross, 20 minutes into that same day's episode of Raw.

== Music career ==
In 1977, Blassie recorded voiceovers for the songs "Blassie, King of Men" and "Pencil Neck Geek", which were performed by Johnny Legend, featuring Billy Zoom on guitar, Jay Phillips on guitar, Lon Osgood on bass and Steve Clark on drums. They received acclaim on the Dr. Demento Radio Show, and the latter song was featured on several albums, including Dr. Demento's 20th anniversary collection, The Very Best of Dr. Demento, and Dr. Demento Presents the Greatest Novelty CDs of All Time. In 1983, Rhino Records released a 14-track album by Blassie, titled I Bite the Songs.

== Film career ==
Blassie appeared in an episode of The Dick Van Dyke Show that featured a new dance craze called The Twizzle. Rose Marie's character Sally Rogers brought him on at the end of the episode claiming to have discovered another new dance sensation. In the demonstration of the dance, Blassie picked up Rob Petrie and twirled him over his head.

Filmed in 1982, My Breakfast with Blassie featured Andy Kaufman and Freddie Blassie eating at a Sambo's in Los Angeles. (The film was referenced by American rock band R.E.M. in their 1992 song about Kaufman, "Man on the Moon".) The movie's title and premise are parodies of the 1981 art-house classic My Dinner with Andre.

"Classy" Freddie Blassie appeared in a live-action segment of the cartoon "Hulk Hogan's Rock 'n' Wrestling." In the segment he is interviewed by "Mean" Gene Okerlund when the two are interrupted by a little old lady in a housekeeper outfit that Blassie claims to be his own mother.

"Classy" Freddie Blassie also made a cameo appearance as himself, along with "Wrestling's Living Legend" Bruno Sammartino, and Ric Flair in the 1986 film Body Slam starring Dirk Benedict, "Captain" Lou Albano, and "Rowdy" Roddy Piper.

In the early 1990s, the wrestler starred in a documentary directed by Jeff Krulik, titled Mr. Blassie Goes To Washington. In it, Blassie is picked up at the Washington, D.C., airport by a limo full of young women, escorted around the nation's capital, gives his opinions and confronts tourists. When meeting someone, he would ask where they were from, and no matter their response, he would reply with, "Oh, that's God's country!"

== Championships and accomplishments ==
- 50th State Big Time Wrestling
  - NWA North American Heavyweight Championship (Hawaii version) (1 time)
- Cauliflower Alley Club
  - Other honoree (1998)
- Championship Wrestling from Florida
  - NWA Southern Heavyweight Championship (Florida version) (1 time)
  - NWA World Tag Team Championship (Florida version) (1 time) – with Tarzan Tyler
- Mid-South Sports
  - NWA Georgia Heavyweight Championship (1 time)
  - NWA International Tag Team Championship (Georgia version) (3 times) – with Kurt von Brauner (1), Bob Shipp (1) and Eric Pederson (1)
  - NWA Southern Heavyweight Championship (Georgia version) (17 times)
  - NWA World Tag Team Championship (Georgia version) (2 times) – with Bill Blassie
- National Wrestling Alliance
  - NWA Hall of Fame (Class of 2011)
  - NWA World Junior Heavyweight Championship (1 time)
- North American Wrestling Alliance/Worldwide Wrestling Associates/ NWA Hollywood Wrestling
  - NAWA World Heavyweight Championship (1 time)
  - NWA Americas Heavyweight Championship (4 times)
  - NWA Americas Tag Team Championship (1 time) – with Don Carson
  - WWA Americas Heavyweight Championship (1 time)
  - WWA International Television Tag Team Championship (3 times) – with Mr. Moto (2) and Don Leo Jonathan (1)
  - WWA World Heavyweight Championship (4 times)
  - WWA World Tag Team Championship (2 times) – with Mr. Moto (1), and Buddy Austin (1)
- NWA Mid-America
  - NWA Southern Junior Heavyweight Championship (1 time)
- Pro Wrestling Illustrated
  - PWI Stanley Weston Award (2000)
- Professional Wrestling Hall of Fame and Museum
  - Television Era (Class of 2004)
- World Wrestling Federation
  - WWF Hall of Fame (Class of 1994)
  - Slammy Award (1 time)
    - Lifetime Achievement Award (1996)
- Wrestling Observer Newsletter
  - Worst Worked Match of the Year (1985) vs. Lou Albano
  - Wrestling Observer Newsletter Hall of Fame (Class of 1996)
