= Gene Dubuque =

American professional wrestler (1927–1974)

Personal information
- Born: Eugene Earl Dubuque; December 11, 1927 New York City, New York, U.S.
- Died: March 13, 1974 (aged 46) Inyo County, California, U.S.

Professional wrestling career
- Ring name(s): Gene Dubuque; Magnificent Maurice; Gene Darval
- Billed height: 5 ft 11 in (1.80 m)
- Billed weight: 230 lb (104 kg)
- Trained by: George Linnehan
- Debut: 1947
- Retired: 1971

Eugene Earl Dubuque (December 11, 1927 – March 13, 1974), known by the ring name Magnificent Maurice and Gene Dubuque, was an American professional wrestler, actor and bodybuilder who wrestled mainly during his career for World Wide Wrestling Federation between 1963-1969, and 1971 and teamed most of his career with Johnny Barend.

== Professional wrestling career ==
=== Early career ===
Dubuque was born in 1927 to American and Russian parents. He was an amateur bodybuilder, winning the 1947 Mr. New York City contest and turned into pro wrestling in 1949 in wrestling in New York City. He later went to Texas, San Francisco, Hawaii, and Stampede Wrestling in Calgary, Canada. On June 24, 1957 he lost to Ilio DiPaolo in a Best out of three falls in Los Angeles. In 1958 he teamed up with Mike Valentino and won the NWA World Tag Team Championship (San Francisco version) where he won the titles once with Valentino and twice with Fritz von Goering.

He later became Magnificent Maurice in 1959. He started teaming up with Johnny Barend in 1960 and they won four different tag teams titles from 1962-1968. In 1961 he won the NWA San Francisco Pacific Coast Heavyweight Championship defeating Ramon Torres. He wrestled for American Wrestling Association from 1960-1963.

=== World Wide Wrestling Federation ===
In 1963 Maurice and Barend went to the New York Territory for the World Wide Wrestling Federation where they sometimes teamed with Buddy Rogers feuding with Bobo Brazil, Dory Dixon, and Pedro Morales. Maurice had a few singles matches feuding against Bruno Sammartino for the WWWF Heavyweight title. From 1964-1965 he feuded with Bill Watts and Wahoo McDaniel. By 1969 he left the company.

=== Later career ===
Maurice reunited with Barend in 1965 at Detroit's Big Time Wrestling (Detroit). He also wrestled in Hawaii for 50th State Big Time Wrestling in 1968 winning the NWA Hawaii Tag Team Championship with Barend. In 1971 he returned to World Wide Wrestling Federation as Gene Dubuque.

== Personal life ==
During the last few years of his life he had a career in Hollywood. He was hired by Wolper Productions, run by David Wolper, to perform the part of a prehistoric man in the ABC-TV documentary "Primal Man." On March 13, 1974 Dubuque and a crew went out to the Mammoth Lakes area in the Inyo National Forest (Inyo County, California) to shoot for the film Primal Man, and they were set to return to Burbank. Their Sierra Pacific plane, Convair 440, was chartered by the company, and took off from Bishop Airport carrying 31 members of the production crew and 5 airplane staff. Five minutes later, the plane crashed into a White Mountains ridge, killing all aboard including Dubuque. He was only 46 years old.

== Championships and accomplishments ==
- 50th State Big Time Wrestling
  - NWA Hawaii Tag Team Championship (1) – with Johnny Barend
- American Wrestling Alliance (Indiana)
  - AWA Indiana World Tag Team Championship (1 time) – with Johnny Barend
- Midwest Wrestling Association (Ohio)
  - MWA Ohio Tag Team Championship (1 time) – with Johnny Barend
- NWA Detroit
  - NWA World Tag Team Championship (Detroit version) (1 time) – with Johnny Barend
- NWA San Francisco
  - NWA World Tag Team Championship (San Francisco version) (3 time) – with Mike Valentino (1), Fritz von Goering (2)
  - NWA San Francisco Pacific Coast Heavyweight Championship (1 time)
