= Tor Kamata =

American professional wrestler (1937–2007)

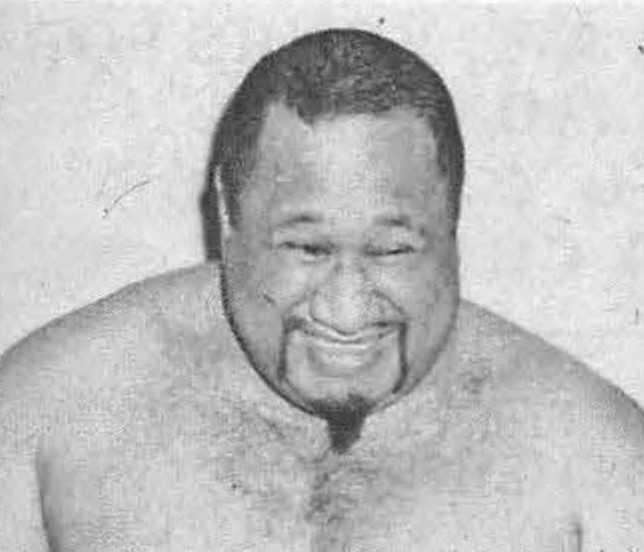
- Kamata, circa 1979

Personal information
- Born: McRonald Kamaka; March 9, 1937 Territory of Hawaii
- Died: July 23, 2007 (aged 70) Saskatoon, Saskatchewan Canada

Professional wrestling career
- Ring name(s): Tor Kamata; Tor Kamaka "King" Tor Kamaka; Dr. Moto; Killer Moto
- Billed height: 6 ft 3 in (191 cm)
- Billed weight: 350 lb (159 kg)
- Billed from: Japan; Polynesia
- Debut: 1959
- Retired: 1987

McRonald Kamaka (March 9, 1937 – July 23, 2007) was an American professional wrestler known by the ring name Tor Kamata. He won several heavyweight and tag team championships, most notably the PWF World Heavyweight Championship in All Japan Pro Wrestling and the AWA World Tag Team Championship in the American Wrestling Association. He was a classic heel, reviled for dirty tricks in the ring, included rubbing salt in his opponent's eyes.

== Professional wrestling career ==
After returning to Hawaii after leaving the United States Air Force, 50th State Big Time Wrestling promoter Ed Francis convinced Kamaka to try professional wrestling. He was given the name Tor Kamata in reference to Tomas De Torquemada of the Spanish Inquisition. He also worked as Dr. Moto, holding the American Wrestling Association's AWA World Tag Team Championship with Mitsu Arakawa. One of his signature moves, the "judo chop" became a popular phrase for all types of martial arts strikes in the 1960s, even being mentioned by Snoopy in the comic strip Peanuts (21 December 1964, 14 January 1967). A generation later, the phrase was satirised in the Austin Powers films.

In the early 1970s, Kamata worked for Stampede Wrestling in Canada, where he held the Stampede North American Heavyweight Championship three times. In the promotion, he feuded with Dan Kroffat.

In 1976 and 1977, Kamata wrestled in the World Wide Wrestling Federation. Managed by Freddie Blassie, he had two memorable matches with Bob Backlund when Backlund was on the brink of becoming the WWWF Champion. In the first, Kamata threw salt into Backlund's eyes, which set the stage for a televised Texas Death match, aired May 7, 1977. Again Kamata threw salt in Backlund's eyes, so Backlund merely used the referee's shirt to wipe it out. Then Backlund delivered an Atomic Knee Drop and won the match. At the time, Superstar Billy Graham had just defeated Bruno Sammartino for the championship and Backlund was being built up as the number one contender.

After WWWF, Kamata worked for All Japan Pro Wrestling in 1978 where he worked there to the end of his career.

Kamata returned to WWWF, now WWF in 1980 feuding with WWF Champion Bob Backlund and Pedro Morales. He left later that year and returned to Japan. He worked in various territories until his retirement in 1987.

== Personal life ==
Kamata was an amateur wrestler during high school. He was a club bouncer before becoming a professional wrestler. He joined the United States Air Force and trained with amateur wrestlers in Turkey. During the 1970s, he owned restaurants in Calgary, Alberta, and Saskatoon, Saskatchewan, where he also ran a shiatsu business.

Kamata died on July 23, 2007, in Saskatoon after almost a decade of heart disease.

== Championships and accomplishments ==
- 50th State Big Time Wrestling
  - NWA Hawaii Heavyweight Championship (2 times)
  - NWA North American Heavyweight Championship (Hawaii version) (1 time)
  - NWA Pacific International Heavyweight Championship (1 time)
- All Japan Pro Wrestling
  - PWF World Heavyweight Championship (1 time)
  - World's Strongest Tag Determination League Outstanding Performance Award (1978) - with Abdullah the Butcher & The Sheik
- American Wrestling Association
  - AWA World Tag Team Championship (1 time) - with Mitsu Arakawa
- Southwest Sports, Inc. / Big Time Wrestling

- NWA World Tag Team Championship (6 times) - with Duke Keomuka

- Central States Wrestling
  - NWA North America Tag Team Championship (Central States version) (1 time) - with Luke Brown
- Mid-Atlantic Championship Wrestling
  - NWA Southern Tag Team Championship (Mid-Atlantic version) (4 times) - with Kinji Shibuya (2) and Duke Keomuka (2)
- NWA Los Angeles
  - NWA "Beat the Champ" Television Championship (3 times)
- NWA New Zealand
  - NWA Australasian Tag Team Championship (3 times) - with Baron Von Krupp (1), Ox Baker (1), and General Hiro (1)
  - NWA New Zealand British Empire Heavyweight Championship (1 time)
- NWA Mid-America
  - NWA Southern Tag Team Championship (Mid-America version) (1 time) - with Tojo Yamamoto
- Stampede Wrestling
  - NWA International Tag Team Championship (Calgary version) (1 time) - with Sugi Sito
  - Stampede North American Heavyweight Championship (3 times)
  - Stampede Wrestling Hall of Fame (Class of 1995)
- Western States Alliance
  - WSA Western States Tag Team Championship (2 times) - with Woody Farmer and Kalalua
- World Wrestling Association
  - WWA World Tag Team Championship (3 times) - Mitsu Arakawa
- Worldwide Wrestling Associates / NWA Hollywood Wrestling
  - NWA World Tag Team Championship (Los Angeles version) (1 time) - with Kamalamala
  - WWA World Tag Team Championship (1 time) - with Freddie Blassie
  - NWA International Television Tag Team Championship (5 times) - with Hans Hermann (1), Freddie Blassie (2), Bearcat Wright (1) and Kintarō Ōki (1)
- World Wrestling Council
  - WWC Puerto Rico Heavyweight Championship (1 time)
