= NWA Southern Junior Heavyweight Championship =

Professional wrestling championship

Details
- Promotion: NWA Mid-America
- Date established: May 25, 1939
- Date retired: July 27, 1974
Statistics
- First champion(s): Joe Gunther
- Most reigns: Len Rossi (7 reign)
- Longest reign: Tojo Yamamoto (512 days)
- Shortest reign: Siki Samara (<1 day)

The NWA Southern Junior Heavyweight Championship is a professional wrestling title for lighter wrestlers, board-controlled by the National Wrestling Alliance since December 1949.

It originally was used by various promotions across the Southeastern United States, most prevalently in NWA Mid-America based Tennessee. In August 1974, it was renamed the NWA Southern Heavyweight Championship (Memphis version).

The title was revived by the NWA in December 1999, and is used in the NWA Mid-South promotion, based in Humboldt, Tennessee.

== Title history ==
Key
No.	Overall reign number
Reign	Reign number for the specific champion
Days	Number of days held

No.	Champion	Championship change			Reign statistics		Notes	Ref.
No.	Champion	Date	Event	Location	Reign	Days	Notes	Ref.
1	Joe Gunther	May 25, 1939 (NLT)	GCCW show	New Orleans	1	N/A	Recognized in Louisiana, Alabama, Georgia, and Mississippi.	
—		N/A	—	—				
2	Tommy Ward	March 20, 1950 (NLT)	GCCW show	N/A	1	N/A	Recognized in Florida and Georgia.	
—		N/A	—	—				
3	Karl Kowalski	September 18, 1950 (NLT)	GCCW show	N/A	1	N/A	Recognized in Georgia.	
—		N/A	—	—				
4	Henry Harrell	April 19, 1952	GCCW show	Jackson, Mississippi	1	N/A	Defeated Tex Riley in a tournament final.	
5	Herb Welch	July 1952	GCCW show	Knoxville, Tennessee	1	N/A		
6	Al Galento	August 21, 1952	GCCW show	Chattanooga, Tennessee	1	N/A		
7	Tex Riley	October 1952	GCCW show	Kingsport, Tennessee	1	N/A		
8	Jesse James	N/A	GCCW show	N/A	1	N/A		
—		N/A	—	—				
9	Red Roberts	January 1953 (NLT)	GCCW show	N/A	1	N/A	Recognized in Alabama, Georgia and Tennessee.	
10	Ray Piret	March 17, 1954	GCCW show	Nashville, Tennessee	1	341		
11	Sonny Myers	February 21, 1955	GCCW show	Birmingham, Alabama	1	155		
12	Frank Jares	July 26, 1955	GCCW show	Birmingham, Alabama	1	301		
13	The Masked Bat	May 22, 1956	GCCW show	Nashville, Tennessee	1	7		
14	Frank Jares	May 29, 1956	GCCW show	Nashville, Tennessee	2	56		
15	Jesse James	July 24, 1956	GCCW show	Nashville, Tennessee	2	14		
16	Frank Jares	August 7, 1956	GCCW show	Nashville, Tennessee	3	20		
17	Herb Welch	August 27, 1956	GCCW show	Birmingham, Alabama	2	23		
18	The Great Malenko	September 19, 1956	GCCW show	Mobile, Alabama	1	27		
19	Herb Welch	October 16, 1956	GCCW show	Mobile, Alabama	3	132		
20	Tor Yamata	February 25, 1957	GCCW show	Birmingham, Alabama	1	112		
21	Cyclone Anaya	June 17, 1957	GCCW show	Birmingham, Alabama	1	65		
22	Mario Galento	August 21, 1957	GCCW show	Mobile, Alabama	1	N/A		
—	Vacated	September 1957	—	—	—	—	Vacated due to Galento not defending.	
23	Cyclone Anaya	September 1957	GCCW show	N/A	2	N/A		
24	Tor Yamata	October 1, 1957	GCCW show	Nashville, Tennessee	2	41		
25	Ray Stevens	November 11, 1957	GCCW show	Birmingham, Alabama	1	N/A		
26	Tor Yamata	January 1958 (NLT)	GCCW show	N/A	3	N/A		
27	Herb Welch	March 17, 1958	GCCW show	Memphis, Tennessee	3	N/A		
—		N/A	—	—				
28	Fred Blassie	May 1958 (NLT)	GCCW show	N/A	1	N/A		
—		N/A	—	—				
29	Ray Stevens	June 1958 (NLT)	GCCW show	N/A	2	N/A		
30	Corsica Jean	July 22, 1958	GCCW show	Nashville, Tennessee	1	N/A		
31	Ray Stevens	October 1958 (NLT)	GCCW show	N/A	3	N/A		
—	Vacated	October 1958	—	—	—	—	Stevens left the territory.	
32	Yvon Robert	1958	GCCW show	Birmingham, Alabama	1	N/A		
33	Jesse James	January 12, 1959	GCCW show	Birmingham, Alabama	3	261		
34	Jackie Fargo	September 30, 1959	GCCW show	Mobile, Alabama	1	89		
35	Mike Clancy	December 28, 1959	GCCW show	Birmingham, Alabama	1	360		
36	Bill Monroe	December 22, 1960	GCCW show	Chattanooga, Tennessee	1	5		
37	Len Rossi	December 27, 1960	GCCW show	Nashville, Tennessee	1	207		
38	Don Greene	July 22, 1961	GCCW show	Chattanooga, Tennessee	1	170		
39	Len Rossi	January 8, 1962	GCCW show	Memphis, Tennessee	2	41		
40	Taro Sakuro	February 18, 1962	GCCW show	Chattanooga, Tennessee	1	109		
41	Joe Lanza	June 7, 1962	GCCW show	Chattanooga, Tennessee	1	N/A		
—		N/A	GCCW show	—		N/A		
42	Jackie Fargo	August 1962 (NLT)	GCCW show	N/A	2	N/A		
—		N/A	GCCW show	—		N/A		
43	Hans Steiner	September 1962 (NLT)	GCCW show	N/A	1	N/A		
—		N/A	GCCW show	—		N/A		
44	Len Rossi	May 1963 (NLT)	GCCW show	N/A	1	N/A		
45	Frankie Cain	May 1963	GCCW show	Memphis, Tennessee	1	N/A		
—		N/A	GCCW show	—		N/A		
46	Alex Perez	January 1964 (NLT)	GCCW show	N/A	1	N/A		
47	Rocky Smith	November 1964 (NLT)	GCCW show	N/A	1	N/A		
48	Alex Perez	February 8, 1965	GCCW show	Memphis, Tennessee	2	N/A		
49	Rocky Smith	November 1965 (NLT)	GCCW show	N/A	2	N/A		
—	Vacated	December 16, 1965	GCCW show	—	—	—	Held up after a match against Hiro Matsuda	
50	Rocky Smith	December 23, 1965	GCCW show	Chattanooga, Tennessee	3	26	Defeated Matsuda in a rematch.	
51	Alex Perez	January 18, 1966	GCCW show	Nashville, Tennessee	3	80		
52	Al Costello	April 8, 1966	GCCW show	Nashville, Tennessee	1	20		
53	Karl von Brauner	April 28, 1966	GCCW show	Chattanooga, Tennessee	1	90		
54	Jackie Fargo	July 27, 1966	GCCW show	Nashville, Tennessee	3	N/A		
—		N/A	GCCW show	—		N/A		
55	Len Rossi	April 1967 (NLT)	GCCW show	N/A	4	N/A		
56	The Great Yamaha	August 19, 1967	GCCW show	Chattanooga, Tennessee	1	12		
57	Len Rossi	August 31, 1967	GCCW show	Chattanooga, Tennessee	5	201		
58	Tojo Yamamoto	March 19, 1968	GCCW show	Chattanooga, Tennessee	1	512		
—		N/A	GCCW show	—		0		
59	Siki Samara	August 13, 1969	GCCW show	Mobile, Alabama	1	0	Samara was awarded the title.	
60	Jimmy Jones	August 13, 1969	GCCW show	Mobile, Alabama	1	7		
61	Siki Samara	August 20, 1969	GCCW show	Mobile, Alabama	2	0		
62	Siki Samara	August 20, 1969	GCCW show	Mobile, Alabama	2	N/A		
—		N/A	GCCW show	—		N/A		
63	Len Rossi	March 1970 (NLT)	GCCW show	N/A	6	N/A		
64	Sputnik Monroe	July 1, 1971	GCCW show	Chattanooga, Tennessee	1	N/A		
65	Len Rossi	August 1971	GCCW show	N/A	7	N/A		
—	Vacated	1973	GCCW show	—	—	—	Rossi suffers a broken ankle.	
66	Tommy Gilbert	1973	GCCW show	Birmingham, Alabama	1	N/A		
67	Lou Thesz	1973	GCCW show	N/A	1	N/A		
68	Tommy Gilbert	1973	GCCW show	N/A	2	N/A		
69	Ron Garvin	December 1973 (NLT)	GCCW show	N/A	1	N/A		
70	Tommy Gilbert	January 1974	GCCW show	Birmingham, Alabama	3	N/A		
71	Lou Thesz	March 18, 1974	GCCW show	Memphis, Tennessee	2	23		
72	Tommy Gilbert	April 10, 1974	GCCW show	Nashville, Tennessee	4	5		
73	Jerry Lawler	April 15, 1974	GCCW show	Memphis, Tennessee	1	49		
74	Ricky Gibson	June 3, 1974	GCCW show	Memphis, Tennessee	1	7		
75	Jerry Lawler	June 10, 1974	GCCW show	Memphis, Tennessee	2	14		
76	Jackie Fargo	June 24, 1974	GCCW show	Memphis, Tennessee	4	14		
77	Jerry Lawler	July 8, 1974	GCCW show	Memphis, Tennessee	3	12		
78	Jackie Fargo	July 20, 1974	GCCW show	Chattanooga, Tennessee	5	7		
79	Jerry Lawler	July 27, 1974	GCCW show	Chattanooga, Tennessee	4	N/A		
NWA Southern Heavyweight Championship

== See also ==
- Continental Wrestling Association
- National Wrestling Alliance
