= Hiro Sasaki =

Professional wrestling career
- Ring name(s): Hiro Sasaki, General Hiro
- Billed from: Japan

Hiro Sasaki was a professional wrestler.

== Championships and accomplishments ==
- NWA New Zealand

- NWA Australasian Tag Team Championship (1 time) - with King Kamaka

- World Wrestling Council

- WWC World Tag Team Championship (1 time) - with Kengo Kimura
