= WWWF United States Heavyweight Championship =

Former men's professional wrestling championship

- One version of the belt that represented the championship in the 1960s and 1970s

Details
- Promotion: World Wide Wrestling Federation
- Date established: April 20, 1960
- Date retired: March 1, 1976

Other names
- NWA United States Heavyweight Championship (Northeast version) (1960–1961)
Statistics
- First champion: Buddy Rogers
- Final champion: Bobo Brazil
- Most reigns: Bobo Brazil (7 reigns)
- Longest reign: Bobo Brazil (1,837 days)
- Shortest reign: The Sheik (21 days)
- Oldest champion: Bobo Brazil (46 years, 225 days)
- Youngest champion: Pedro Morales (28 years, 77 days)
- Heaviest champion: Bobo Brazil (270lb (122kg))
- Lightest champion: Johnny Barend (230lb (100kg))

The WWWF United States Heavyweight Championship was a singles title used sporadically in the World Wide Wrestling Federation (WWWF; WWE as of 2002) between 1960 and 1976. During the variable periods in which it was used, the title served as the promotion's secondary singles championship to the WWWF World Heavyweight Championship. Three years after the title was retired, and after the promotion had been renamed to World Wrestling Federation (WWF), it was replaced by the WWF Intercontinental Heavyweight Championship as the company's secondary title.

The title originated as the Northeast version of the NWA United States Heavyweight Championship and was used in the WWWF's precursor, Capitol Wrestling Corporation (CWC), a territory of the National Wrestling Alliance (NWA). After CWC split from the NWA in 1963 and became the WWWF, the title subsequently became a WWWF championship. The inaugural champion was Buddy Rogers while the final champion was Bobo Brazil.

The title is distinct from the WWE United States Championship, which originated in 1974 as the Mid-Atlantic version of the NWA United States Heavyweight Championship. That title later became property of World Championship Wrestling, which was acquired by WWE, at the time WWF, in 2001.

== History ==
Prior to the Capitol Wrestling Corporation (CWC) leaving the National Wrestling Alliance (NWA) and becoming the World Wide Wrestling Federation (WWWF; WWE as of 2002), the company hosted the Northeast version of the NWA United States Heavyweight Championship for several months in 1960–1961. The only known holder of this title at that time was Buddy Rogers, who vacated the title upon winning the NWA World Heavyweight Championship from Pat O'Connor in Chicago in June 1961. The final champion was Bobo Brazil, as the WWWF abandoned the title on March 1, 1976.

This title has no connection to the WWE United States Championship, the lineage of which dates back to the version of the NWA United States Heavyweight Championship that was created in 1974 in Mid-Atlantic Championship Wrestling, and later, World Championship Wrestling (WCW). WWE, at the time known as the World Wrestling Federation (WWF), acquired WCW in 2001.

== Reigns ==
Over the championship's 16-year history, there were 14 reigns between six champions and three vacancies. Buddy Rogers was the inaugural champion while Bobo Brazil was the final. Brazil had the most reigns at seven, and his seventh reign was the longest at 1,837 days, while The Sheik's second reign was the shortest at 21 days. Brazil was the oldest champion at 46 years old, while Pedro Morales was the youngest at 28 years old.

Key
| No. | Overall reign number |
| Reign | Reign number for the specific champion |
| Days | Number of days held |

| No. | Champion | Championship change | | | Reign statistics | | Notes | Ref. |
| No. | Champion | Date | Event | Location | Reign | Days | Notes | Ref. |
|---|---|---|---|---|---|---|---|---|
National Wrestling Alliance: Capitol Wrestling Corporation (CWC)
| 1 | Buddy Rogers | April 20, 1960 | — | — | 1 | 436 | Rogers was recognized as the inaugural holder of the Northeast version of the NWA United States Heavyweight Championship. Defended the title against Arnold Skaaland on this day on a card in Bridgeport, Connecticut. | |
| — | Vacated | June 30, 1961 | — | — | — | — | Buddy Rogers vacated the championship after defeating Pat O'Connor for the NWA World Heavyweight Championship. | |
National Wrestling Alliance: World Wide Wrestling Federation (WWWF)
| 2 | Bobo Brazil | April 6, 1963 | House Show | California | 1 | 63 | The championship was renamed to the WWWF United States Heavyweight Championship during this reign. | |
| 3 | Johnny Barend | June 8, 1963 | House Show | Philadelphia, PA | 1 | 31 | | |
| 4 | Bobo Brazil | July 9, 1963 | House Show | Philadelphia, PA | 2 | 64 | | |
| 5 | Johnny Barend | September 11, 1963 | House Show | Landover, MD | 2 | 41 | | |
| 6 | Bobo Brazil | October 22, 1963 | House Show | Quakertown, PA | 3 | 1,335 | | |
| 7 | Ray Stevens | June 18, 1967 | House Show | (Note: The location of the championship change has not been found documented.) | 1 | 67 | | |
| 8 | Bobo Brazil | August 24, 1967 | House Show | Trenton, NJ | 4 | 29 | | |
| 9 | The Sheik | September 22, 1967 | House Show | Detroit, MI | 1 | 429 | | |
| 10 | Bobo Brazil | November 24, 1968 | House Show | | 5 | 57 | | |
| 11 | The Sheik | January 20, 1969 | House Show | Boston, MA | 2 | 21 | | |
| 12 | Bobo Brazil | February 10, 1969 | House Show | Washington D.C. | 6 | 687 | | |
| — | Vacated | December 29, 1970 | — | — | — | — | The championship was vacated after Bobo Brazil sustained an injury. | |
| 13 | Pedro Morales | January 7, 1971 | House Show | Los Angeles, CA | 1 | 32 | Defeated Freddie Blassie in a tournament final to win the vacant championship. | |
| — | Vacated | February 8, 1971 | — | — | — | — | Pedro Morales vacated the championship after winning the WWWF Championship. | |
| 14 | Bobo Brazil | February 19, 1971 | House Show | Harrisburg, PA | 7 | 1,837 | Brazil was awarded the title by the WWWF. | |
National Wrestling Alliance: World Wide Wrestling Federation (WWWF)
| — | Deactivated | March 1, 1976 | — | — | — | — | Bobo Brazil was the final champion after the WWWF abandoned the title on March 1, 1976. Seven weeks later on April 21, Brazil won the NWA Detroit version of the title. | |

== Combined reigns ==
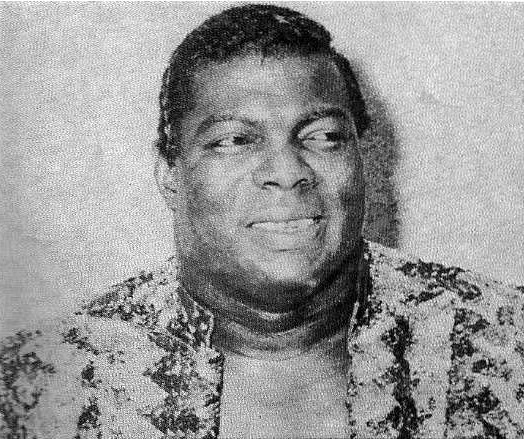
Record seven-time and longest reigning champion, Bobo Brazil

| Rank | Wrestler | No. of reigns | Combined days |
|---|---|---|---|
| 1 | Bobo Brazil | 7 | 4,072 |
| 2 | The Sheik | 2 | 450 |
| 3 | Buddy Rogers | 1 | 436 |
| 4 | Johnny Barend | 2 | 72 |
| 5 | Ray Stevens | 1 | 67 |
| 6 | Pedro Morales | 1 | 32 |

== See also ==
- WWE United States Championship
- World Wrestling Entertainment
- Professional wrestling in the United States
