= NWA Australasian Tag Team Championship =

Professional wrestling tag team championship

Australasian Tag Team Championship

Details
- Promotion: All Star Pro Wrestling
- Date established: 1981
- Date retired: 1984
Statistics
- First champions: Steve Rickard and Mark Lewin

The New Zealand version of the NWA Austra-Asian Tag Team Championship was a professional wrestling tag team championship defended in the National Wrestling Alliance-affiliated All Star Pro Wrestling from 1981 to 1984. The titles were awarded to Steve Rickard and Mark Lewin on October 8, 1981, and were last held by Mark and Chris Youngblood in late-1984 before the titles were retired. There were 7 officially recognized teams and 16 individual champions in the titles 3-year history.

== Title history ==
#	Order in reign history
Reign	The reign number for the specific set of wrestlers listed
Event	The event in which the title was won
—	Used for vacated reigns so as not to count it as an official reign
N/A	The information is not available or is unknown
+	Indicates the current reign is changing daily

=== Reigns ===
#	Wrestlers	Reign	Date	Days held	Location	Event	Notes	Ref.
1	Steve Rickard and Mark Lewin	1	October 8, 1981	210	N/A	Live event	Awarded titles.	
2	King Kamaka and Baron Von Krupp	1	May 6, 1982	21	Auckland	Live event		
3	Steve Rickard and Mark Lewin	2	May 27, 1982	84	Auckland	Live event		
4	King Kamaka (2) and Ox Baker	1	August 19, 1982	42	Auckland	Live event		
5	Mark Lewin (3) and Al Perez	1	September 30, 1982	21	Auckland	Live event		
6	King Kamaka (3) and General Hiro	1	October 21, 1982	N/A	Auckland	Live event		
—	N/A	—	1982-1983	—	N/A	N/A	Title history is unrecorded.	
7	Larry O'Day and Ripper Collins	1	1983	N/A	N/A	N/A		
—	N/A	—	1983-1984	—	N/A	N/A	Title history is unrecorded.	
8	Mark and Chris Youngblood	1	1984	N/A	N/A	N/A		
—	Deactivated	—	N/A	—	N/A	N/A	The titles are retired in the mid-1980s.	
