= Ed Francis =

American professional wrestler and promoter (1926–2016)

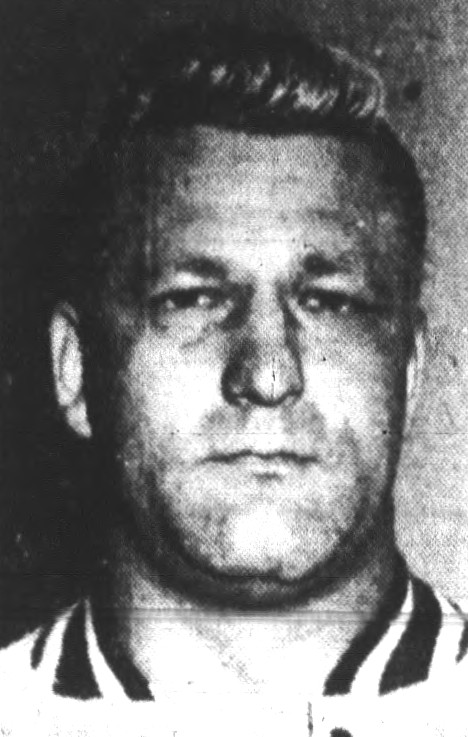
- Francis, circa 1956

Personal information
- Born: Edmund Charles Francis; June 11, 1926 Chicago, Illinois, U.S.
- Died: November 18, 2016 (aged 90) Overland Park, Kansas, U.S.
- Website: http://gentlemanedfrancis.com/

Professional wrestling career
- Ring name: "Gentleman" Ed Francis
- Debut: 1951
- Retired: 1979

Edmund Charles Francis (June 11, 1926 – November 18, 2016) was an American professional wrestler and wrestling promoter in Hawaii in the 1960s. Many wrestlers who came through Hawaii in the 1960s and 1970s were bound to come across the name Ed Francis. However, the glory days of territorial wrestling were coming to an end, and in 1979, he sold the 50th State Big Time Wrestling promotion to "High Chief” Peter Maivia.

== Personal life ==
Francis raised his children on the windward side of Kailua, Oahu. His two sons, Bill and Russ, also enjoyed a wrestling career for a little while. Russ also had a career in the NFL, playing 13 seasons. Russ won a Super Bowl playing for the San Francisco 49ers (Jan 1985). He later went on to work with the Omaha Beef Arena Football Team. One of the Francis brothers' contemporaries was wrestler Don Muraco; they attended high school together. Along with his two famous sons he also had four other sons and a daughter, Ed "Sonny" Francis, Steven, Bob, James and Arlene "Pixie" Francis, respectively. He later moved his brood to Eugene, Oregon.

== Championships and accomplishments ==
- Cauliflower Alley Club
  - Other honoree (1994)
- Midwest Wrestling Association
  - MWA Ohio Tag Team Championship (2 times) - with Ray Stevens (1) and Leon Graham (1)
- NWA Tri-State
  - NWA World Junior Heavyweight Championship (1 time)
- Pacific Northwest Wrestling
  - NWA Pacific Northwest Heavyweight Championship (5 times)
  - NWA Pacific Northwest Tag Team Championship (1 time) – with Eddie Sullivan
- Ring Around The Northwest Newsletter
  - Wrestler of the Year (1957)
- Stampede Wrestling
  - NWA Canadian Heavyweight Championship (Calgary version) (1 time)
