= NWA Pacific International Championship =

American professional wrestling championship

NWA Pacific International Heavyweight Championship

Details
- Promotion: 50th State Big Time Wrestling
- Date established: 1962
- Date retired: 1980

Other names
- NWA United States Heavyweight Championship (Hawaii); NWA North American Heavyweight Championship (Hawaii)
Statistics
- First champion: Nick Bockwinkel
- Most reigns: King Curtis Iaukea (8 reigns)
- Longest reign: Johnny Barend (392 days)
- Shortest reign: Gene Kiniski (20 days)
- Oldest champion: Freddie Blassie (54 years, 169 days)
- Youngest champion: Rick Martel (22 years)
- Heaviest champion: Big John Studd (364 lb (165 kg; 26.0 st))
- Lightest champion: Freddie Blassie (220 lb (100 kg; 16 st))

The NWA Pacific International Heavyweight Championship was the primary singles championship of 50th State Big Time Wrestling, the NWA territory based in Hawaii. The title was originally the Hawaiian version of the NWA United States Heavyweight Championship that was defended in Hawaii. It existed from 1962 until 1968. It was renamed the NWA North American Heavyweight Championship (Hawaii version) in 1968 and renamed again as the NWA Pacific International Heavyweight Championship in 1978, which was the name it used until it was retired in 1980.

== Title history ==
Key
No.	Overall reign number
Reign	Reign number for the specific champion
Days	Number of days held

No.	Champion	Championship change			Reign statistics		Notes	Ref.
No.	Champion	Date	Event	Location	Reign	Days	Notes	Ref.
—		N/A	—	—				
1	Nick Bockwinkel	1962	BTW show	N/A	1	N/A	Records unclear as to how he got title.	
2	King Curtis Iaukea	June 6, 1962	BTW show	Hawaii	1	168		
3	Billy White Wolf	November 21, 1962	BTW show	Hawaii	1	21		
4	King Curtis Iaukea	December 12, 1962	BTW show	Hawaii	2	215		
5	Dick the Bruiser	July 15, 1963	BTW show	Hawaii	1	114		
6	King Curtis Iaukea	November 6, 1963	BTW show	Hawaii	3	N/A		
7	Luther Lindsay	June 1964	BTW show	Hawaii	1	N/A		
8	King Curtis Iaukea	July 1964	BTW show	Hawaii	4	N/A		
9	Enrique Torres	December 12, 1964	BTW show	Hawaii	1	74		
10	Hard Boiled Haggerty	February 24, 1965	BTW show	N/A	1	203		
11	King Curtis Iaukea	September 15, 1965	BTW show	Hawaii	5	49		
12	Killer Kowalski	November 3, 1965	BTW show	Hawaii	1	63		
13	Nick Kozak	January 5, 1966	BTW show	Hawaii	1	28		
14	Johnny Barend	February 2, 1966	BTW show	Hawaii	1	392		
15	King Curtis Iaukea	March 1, 1967	BTW show	Hawaii	6	251		
16	Johnny Barend	November 7, 1967	BTW show	Hawaii	2	169		
17	Jim Hady	April 24, 1968	BTW show	Hawaii	1	21		
18	Ray Stevens	May 15, 1968	BTW show	Hawaii	1	28		
19	Jim Hady	June 12, 1968	BTW show	Hawaii	2	N/A		
NWA North American Championship (Hawaii version)
20	Toru Tanaka	December 25, 1968	BTW show	Hawaii	1	56		
21	Gene Kiniski	February 19, 1969	BTW show	Hawaii	1	119		
22	Pedro Morales	June 18, 1969	BTW show	Hawaii	1	98		
23	King Curtis Iaukea	September 24, 1969	BTW show	Hawaii	7	42		
24	Pedro Morales	November 5, 1969	BTW show	Hawaii	2	94		
25	Johnny Barend	February 7, 1970	BTW show	Hawaii	3	179		
26	Pedro Morales	August 5, 1970	BTW show	Hawaii	3	56		
27	The Destroyer	September 30, 1970	BTW show	Hawaii	1	77		
28	Billy Robinson	December 16, 1970	BTW show	Hawaii	1	24		
29	King Curtis Iaukea	January 9, 1971	BTW show	Hawaii	8	46		
30	Sam Steamboat	February 24, 1971	BTW show	Hawaii	1	77		
31	Gene Kiniski	May 12, 1971	BTW show	Hawaii	2	105		
32	Ed Morrow	August 25, 1971	BTW show	Hawaii	1	15		
33	Gene Kiniski	September 9, 1971	BTW show	Hawaii	3	20		
34	Sam Steamboat	September 29, 1971	BTW show	Hawaii	2	28		
35	Sweet Daddy Siki	October 27, 1971	BTW show	Hawaii	1	147		
36	Johnny Barend	March 22, 1972	BTW show	Hawaii	4	126		
37	Freddie Blassie	July 26, 1972	BTW show	Hawaii	1	63		
38	Sam Steamboat	September 27, 1972	BTW show	Hawaii	3	59		
39	Dusty Rhodes	November 25, 1972	BTW show	Hawaii	1	193		
40	Billy Robinson	June 6, 1973	BTW show	Hawaii	2	N/A		
—	Vacated	1974–1977	—	—	—	—	Championship vacated when 50th State Big Time Wrestling becomes inactive in July 1974	
		N/A	N/A	N/A				
41	John Tolos	July 1977	BTW show	N/A	1	N/A	Awarded when 50th State Big Time Wrestling resumes operations	
42	Sam Steamboat	October 1977	BTW show	Hawaii	4	N/A		
43	Tor Kamata	December 1977	BTW show	Hawaii	1	N/A		
44	Rick Martel	March 1978	BTW show	Hawaii	1	N/A		
45	Big John Studd	June 1978	BTW show	N/A	1	N/A	Awarded when Martel leaves.	
NWA Pacific International Championship
46	Don Muraco	September 1978	BTW show	Hawaii	1	N/A		
47	Tor Kamata	1979	BTW show	Hawaii	2	N/A		
48	Masked Cyclops	1980	BTW show	Hawaii	1	N/A		
49	Siva Afi	1980	BTW show	Hawaii	1	N/A		
—	Deactivated	1980	—	—	—	—		

== See also ==
- National Wrestling Alliance
