= Johnny Barend =

American professional wrestler (1929–2011)

Personal information
- Born: John R. Barend; March 27, 1929 Rochester, New York, U.S.
- Died: September 20, 2011 (aged 82) Avon, New York, U.S.
- Spouse: Annie Lum (m. 1967)

Professional wrestling career
- Ring name(s): Johnny Barend; Masked Man; Mighty Zorro
- Billed height: 6 ft 1 in (185 cm)
- Billed weight: 230 lb (104 kg)
- Trained by: Ed Don George
- Debut: November 1, 1949
- Retired: 1972
- Military service
- Allegiance: United States
- Branch: United States Navy

John R. Barend (March 27, 1929 – September 20, 2011), better known as "Handsome" Johnny Barend, was an American professional wrestler.

== Early life ==
Born in 1929 in Rochester, New York, Barend started wrestling as an amateur at the age of eight. After graduating from Thomas Jefferson High School in Rochester in 1944, he served in the United States Navy during World War II and wrestled while in the service.

== Professional wrestling career ==
=== Early career (1949–1962) ===
He was trained to wrestle professionally by Ed Don George and made his professional debut on November 1, 1949, defeating Faro Rinaldi.

In 1956, he started teaming with Gene Dubuque, who was wrestling under the name, Magnificent Maurice. Barend's original manager was Ernie Roth, then using the name Mr. Kleen. Roth would gain fame in the WWWF as the Grand Wizard of Wrestling during the 1970s. Barend and Maurice went on to win many tag-team championships. Barend first appeared in Hawaii with 50th State Big Time Wrestling in September 1955.

=== Capital Wrestling Corporation / World Wide Wrestling Federation (1962–1963) ===
In 1962–1963, Barend was a regular tag team partner with NWA/WWWF world champion Buddy Rogers. The duo won the Capital Wrestling Corporation's United States Tag Team Championship on July 5, 1962, holding it for 245 days. Barend would hold the NWA Hawaii Tag Team Championship a number of times with a variety of partners as well as the San Francisco version of the NWA World Tag Team Championship.

=== NWA Upstate (1963–1965) ===
Barend left the WWWF in September 1963. The following month, he returned to the New York-based NWA Upstate promotion. Over the following months, his regular opponents included Hans Schmidt, Ilio DiPaolo, Karl Von Hess, and Moose Cholak.

Barend left NWA Upstate in mid-1964 to wrestle for 50th State Big Time Wrestling in Hawaii. He returned to NWA Upstate in January 1965. During 1965, Barend regularly faced Chris and John Tolos, as well as opponents such as Hans Schmidt, Johnny Powers, and The Beast. In December 1965, Barend left NWA Upstate once again to return to Hawaii.

=== 50th State Big Time Wrestling (1964, 1966–1972) ===
Barend wrestled Dory Funk, Jr. in 1969 for the NWA World Heavyweight Championship. He retired from wrestling in 1972.

== Professional wrestling style and persona ==
Barend usually played the part of the "heel" or bad guy. He would enter the ring wearing his customary hat and sunglasses an unlit cigar gracing his lips and would goad fans with his soliloquies. During his time in Hawaii, he came up with the phrase, "Win if you can, lose if you must, but always cheat" which was later "borrowed" by Jesse Ventura.

== Personal life ==
Barend married Annie Lum in 1967 in Honolulu, Hawaii. The ceremony took place during a wrestling show at Honolulu International Center with Jim Hady serving as Barend's best man. The two men wrestled in a tag team match together later in the show, with Annie at ringside.

== Death ==
Barend died on September 20, 2011, in Avon, New York. He reportedly died peacefully in his sleep from natural causes after refusing a visit to the hospital as suggested by his doctor.

== Championships and accomplishments ==
- 50th State Big Time Wrestling
  - NWA Hawaii Heavyweight Championship (2 times)
  - NWA North American Heavyweight Championship (Hawaii version) (2 times)
  - NWA Hawaii Tag Team Championship (7 times) – with Sandor Kovacs (1), Ripper Collins (2), Hans Mortier (1), Jim Hady (1), Magnificent Maurice (1), and Billy Robinson (1)
  - NWA United States Heavyweight Championship (Hawaii version) (1 time)
- American Wrestling Alliance (Indiana)
  - AWA Indiana World Tag Team Championship (1 time) – with Magnificent Maurice
- Capitol Wrestling Corporation/World Wide Wrestling Federation
  - WWWF United States Tag Team Championship (1 time) – with Buddy Rogers
  - WWWF United States Heavyweight Championship (2 times)
- Midwest Wrestling Association (Ohio)
  - MWA Ohio Heavyweight Championship (1 time)
  - MWA Ohio Eastern States Heavyweight Championship (2 times)
  - MWA Ohio Tag Team Championship (1 time) – with Magnificent Maurice
- NWA Detroit
  - NWA World Tag Team Championship (Detroit version) (1 time) – with Magnificent Maurice
- NWA Hollywood Wrestling
  - WWA International Television Tag Team Championship (1 time) - with Bill Melby
- NWA San Francisco
  - NWA World Tag Team Championship (San Francisco version) (1 time) – with Enrique Torres
