= Ray Stevens (wrestler) =

American professional wrestler (1935–1996)

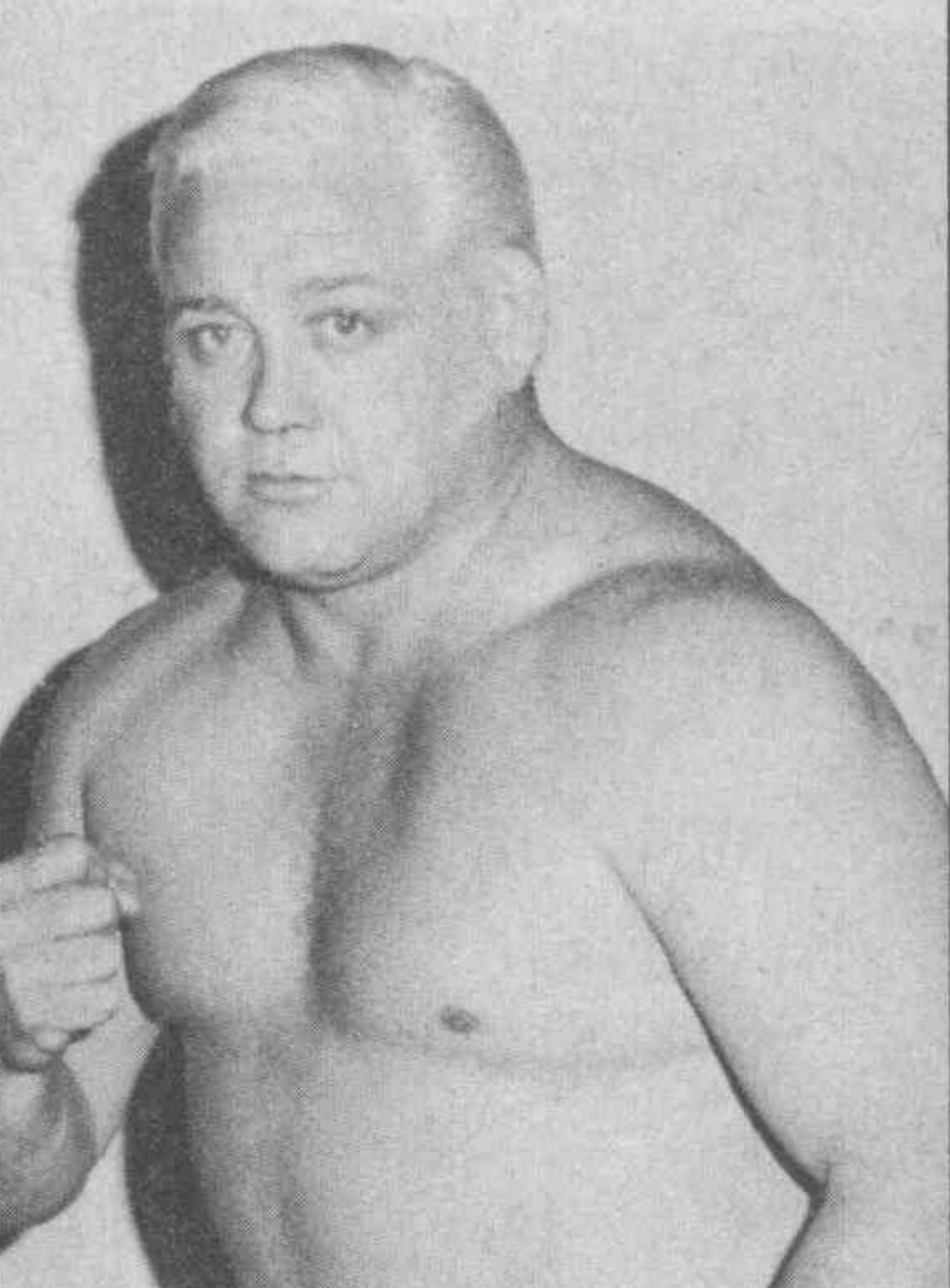

Personal information
- Born: Carl Ray Stevens; September 5, 1935 Point Pleasant, West Virginia, U.S.
- Died: May 3, 1996 (aged 60) Fremont, California, U.S.

Professional wrestling career
- Ring name(s): Ray Shire; Ray Stevens
- Billed height: 5 ft 8 in (1.73 m)
- Billed weight: 235 lb (107 kg)
- Billed from: New York City; San Francisco
- Trained by: Jim Henry; Roy Shire; Theresa Theis
- Debut: 1950
- Retired: 1992

Carl Raymond Stevens (September 5, 1935 – May 3, 1996), better known as Ray "the Crippler" Stevens or Ray "Blond Bomber" Stevens, was an American professional wrestler. Stevens was a wrestling superstar since the early years of the television era until his retirement during the early 1990s.

His performances and hard bumping style inspired generations of villain wrestlers who attempted to emulate his ability to provide high quality and heat-generating matches that continuously brought crowds of fans. He was also known for using two different finishing moves in his many victories: the "Bombs Away" knee drop (a diving knee drop from the top rope to the throat) and the piledriver. Stevens wrestled as both a singles performer and in tag team matches with a variety of partners.

In 2006, he was inducted into the Professional Wrestling Hall of Fame.

== Early life ==
Stevens was born on September 5, 1935, in Point Pleasant, West Virginia, and was raised by an aunt in Columbus, Ohio.

== Professional wrestling career ==
=== Early career (1950-1961) ===
Stevens began his four-decade-long career in 1950 at the age of 15, working for Al Haft. One of Stevens's mentors was the "Nature Boy" Buddy Rogers, a former NWA World Heavyweight Champion. Throughout most of his working years, Stevens worked as a villain, though he occasionally turned into a face. His most famous finishing move was the "Bombs Away" knee drop which involved Ray "the Blond Bomber" jumping off the top turnbuckle and landing with his knee on the throat of his opponent. Stevens's initial foray into main event wrestling involved his matches with one of the 1950s most colorful heels, Gorgeous George. It was a result of his work with George, that Stevens became a main event star. At this stage of his career, Ray Stevens was 17 years old.

Stevens further developed his skills in tag team matches. He initially went into a partnership with Don Fargo as Ray and Don Stevens. In addition, on August 6, 1959, Stevens teamed up with "Professor" Roy Shire as "brother" Ray Shire to win the NWA World Tag Team Championship from Dick the Bruiser and Angelo Poffo. The Shire Brothers were involved in many famous angles until Roy moved on to become the promoter of Big Time Wrestling wrestling programs in San Francisco's Cow Palace. One angle, which took place in Indianapolis on October 1, 1960, involved a "match" between boxer Archie Moore, a former World Light Heavyweight Boxing Champion, and the Shire Brothers. This match did not show Ray and Roy having any significant advantage over Moore. For one thing, the Shire Brothers were required to wear boxing gloves and follow the rules of boxing when they went against professional boxer Moore. Both Ray and Roy were "knocked out" in a matter of minutes. This match did not settle the argument as to who is the superior athlete, the professional boxer or the professional wrestler. A positive outcome of this "match" was the fans, who attended this event in large numbers, having the pleasure of seeing the long-awaited comeuppance of the arrogant and rule-breaking Shire Brothers.

By the end of the 1950s, Ray Stevens was ready to move on to the next stage of his wrestling career, which took place in the city of San Francisco and throughout Northern California.

=== Big Time Wrestling: the San Francisco years (1961-1971) ===
Stevens, reverting to his real name, started out in San Francisco for Big Time Wrestling on March 4, 1961, where he was involved in an angle with Pepper Gomez and captured the NWA United States Championship nine times and the NWA World Tag Team Championship three times. During his first televised interview on the Bay Area's KTVU Channel Two weekly Friday night wrestling show promoting his upcoming match at the Cow Palace, Stevens, speaking with a low pitched growl from the side of his mouth in the manner of a movie tough, shocked the fans when he said San Francisco was a terrible place to live. He also referred to those who watched the wrestling programs as "hillbillies" and "pencil neck geeks." The insults thrown at the inhabitants of San Francisco caused a bit of a stir at the time which helped to further enhance Stevens's box office draw.

One noteworthy characteristic of Ray Stevens was his flexible use of different cities being referred to as his birthplace. His actual birthplace was Point Pleasant, West Virginia. He was, shortly afterward, raised in Columbus, Ohio, by his aunt during the years of the Great Depression. Whenever he was introduced by a wrestling program announcer in San Francisco, his birthplace was New York City. After moving to the East Coast during the early 70s, his birthplace became San Francisco. This was done to plant the idea in the minds of the fans that he was an outsider instead of one of them.

The matches between Pepper Gomez and Ray Stevens, during the early part of the 1960s, certainly set the tenor for the Blond Bomber's dominance as top heel in the Bay Area during the entire decade. Gomez, at the time, had the reputation of having a "cast iron" stomach. He constantly challenged other wrestlers to jump on his stomach and try to get him to sell. Until the Blond Bomber came along, in May 1962, to pick up on this challenge, no wrestler was able succeed in causing more than just a little discomfort from jumping on his stomach. Gomez accepted a challenge from Ray Stevens to jump on his stomach off from a fifteen feet ladder which was placed in the center of the ring. Stevens did so from the halfway point on the ladder, but he did not succeed in getting Gomez to sell. Drawing from his seemingly inexhaustible arsenal of nefarious tactics, Stevens then went to the top of the ladder and, instead of jumping off feet first, he quickly switched to using his Bombs Away knee drop. The impact caused Gomez to spit blood and put him out of action for several weeks. After Gomez recovered from his "injury", he and Stevens had a bout at the Cow Palace which was attended by approximately 17,000 fans with many more turned away due to lack of space. This was the largest paying crowd to have attended any events at the Cow Palace, including a musical extravaganza which starred Elvis Presley.

In 1962, the KTVU television station, in conjunction with its Friday night wrestling program, conducted a major survey that incorporated the opinions of wrestling fans in the Bay Area. The purpose of the survey was to determine which pro wrestler was considered to be the most popular and which one was the most hated. Unsurprisingly, Ray Stevens was selected as the most hated wrestler. However, many wrestling insiders were stunned to find that Stevens was also voted in as the most popular. This vote showed the impact that Stevens had on the wrestling scene in San Francisco and its growing popularity among the fans.

Another match, which took place in 1963, between Gomez and Stevens led to an unexpected ending. After a heated exchange of blows, Gomez grabbed the rather hefty time keeper's bell and spun around to take aim at Stevens's head. Gomez apparently misjudged the weight of the bell when hitting the Blond Bomber. Stevens quickly fell to the mat and laid prone. It took a short while before it was noticed that Stevens was seriously hurt. He was taken to the hospital unconscious. Fortunately, he did not incur brain damage and eventually recovered the next day. The San Francisco Examiner's columnist Jack Rosenbaum, headlining his story about the incident as "A Touch of Realism at the Cow Palace", compared Stevens to a fallen Greek warrior from ancient times. Gomez was fined $5,000 (which was a large sum of money during those times) by the California State Athletic Commission for his part in this mishap. Since then, Stevens and Gomez had many bouts which were always well attended by the fans.

During his San Francisco years, Stevens took on and vanquished wrestlers of such caliber as “Cowboy” Bob Ellis, Karl Gotch, Pat O'Connor, Pepper Gomez, Kinji Shibuya, Bobo Brazil, Bruno Sammartino (through a count out), Pedro Morales, Dr. Big Bill Miller, Ernie "Big Cat" Ladd, Jose Lothario, and many others. More than any other move, the Bombs Away knee drop was the deciding factor in his victories.

In 1965, Stevens teamed up with Pat Patterson to win the NWA World Tag Team Championship. They were known as the "Blond Bombers." Stevens and Patterson had two runs holding the NWA World Tag Team title and one run with the AWA World Tag Team Championship. In 1969, after making a babyface turn, Stevens went against Patterson in a number of mat wars.

On July 15, 1967, Bruno Sammartino, WWWF World Heavyweight Champion, wrestled a two out of three falls match for the title against the Blond Bomber in San Francisco. Stevens pinned Sammartino with the "Bombs Away" to win the first fall; Sammartino forced Stevens to submit to win the second fall; Stevens won the third and deciding fall via countout. It was later determined that according to WWWF rules, a champion could not lose the title due to a count out. Thus, Bruno Sammartino was able to return to the East Coast with his title still intact and the title change was never officially recognized.

Stevens was known for using risky acrobatic moves in his matches. An example of a crowd-pleasing stunt, created by the Blond Bomber in 1965, was the Turnbuckle Flip. After being arm thrown into the far corner, Stevens would go into a half somersault landing with his back on the top turnbuckle and then do a blade job on his forehead before falling to the cement floor. This bumping technique was replicated by a few wrestlers like Ric Flair and Shawn Michaels as part of their in-ring repertoire.

Over the years, Ray Stevens has been viewed by many wrestling insiders as the best worker during the 1960s. Insiders said that Stevens had the ability to make any opponent look good, no matter how badly they may perform in the ring. In addition, he was said to be able to demonstrably convince the fans, through his ring and interview work, that he could methodically and completely destroy anyone regardless of how strong or how big they may be.

=== American Wrestling Association and National Wrestling Alliance (1971-1982) ===
He then moved on to the American Wrestling Association (AWA) in 1971, where he enjoyed success as a four-time AWA World Tag Team champion (three with Nick Bockwinkel, one with Pat Patterson). After that, he captured three NWA World Tag Team titles in Jim Crockett Promotions. It was on January 20, 1972, when Stevens and Nick Bockwinkel first captured the AWA World Tag Team Championship from Crusher Lisowski and Red Bastien in Denver, Colorado. The team was managed by Bobby Heenan beginning in 1974.

While working with the AWA in 1972, Stevens had a television match with a masked wrestler known as Doctor X (Dick Beyer) in which he applied the Bombs Away coup de grâce to win the match while Doctor X's leg was tangled between two ring ropes. This resulted in the "breaking" of Doctor X's leg (which allowed Beyer to leave the area to work with a wrestling tour in Japan as "The Destroyer") and also led to the outlawing of the Bombs Away maneuver by the AWA. It was shortly after that match when Ray Stevens was no longer called the Blond Bomber and became known as "The Crippler."

In 1976, Stevens and Bockwinkel were still the team to beat, but friction was growing within the team. An angle developed where Heenan and Bockwinkel did the talking during their promos and cut Stevens off whenever he tried to speak. When Bobby Heenan was named the 1976 Manager of The Year by a pro wrestling magazine called 'Sports Review Wrestling' on a Christmas Day episode of AWA All-Star Wrestling, Bockwinkel attacked Stevens. This happened because the Crippler pushed Heenan, while Bockwinkel was trying to congratulate Bobby on being the manager of the year; however, Stevens was able to get the upper hand and eventually destroyed a trophy presented to Heenan for his being named "Manager of the Year." This led to the eventual break up of the team and a feud between the two to start the year 1977.

=== World Wide Wrestling Federation/World Wrestling Federation (1972-1973, 1982-1983, 1984) ===
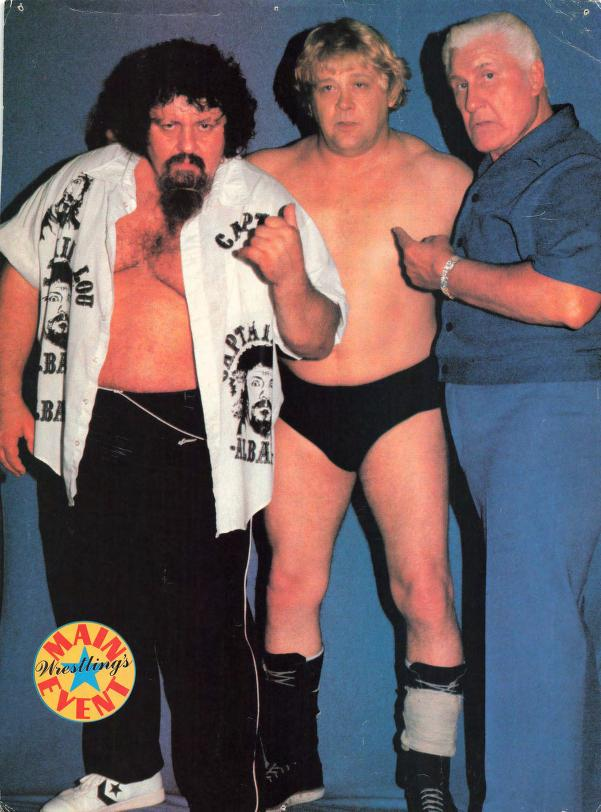
Lou Albano (left), Ray Stevens (center) and Freddie Blassie (right) in 1983

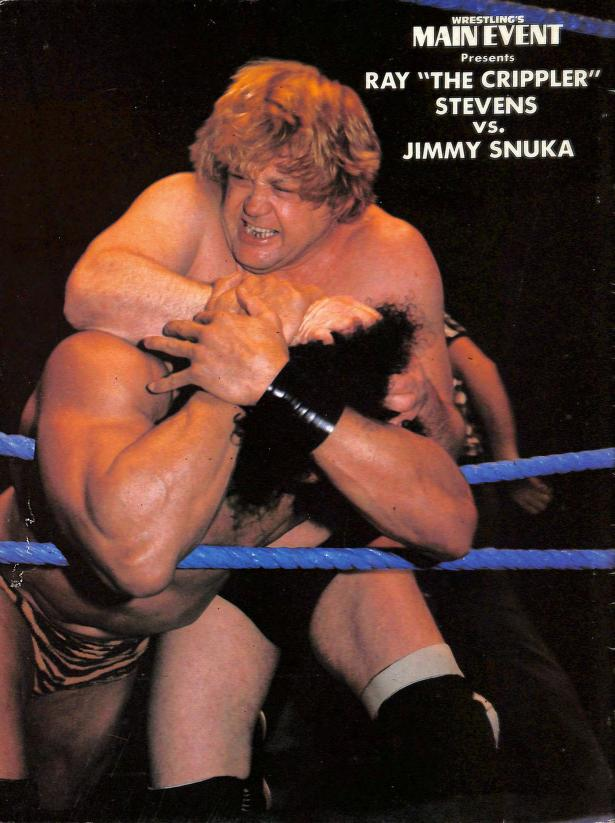
Stevens (top) beats Jimmy Snuka (bottom), circa 1983

From there, he moved to the World Wide Wrestling Federation (WWWF) in 1972 where he feuded with WWWF Heavyweight Champion Pedro Morales but failed to get the title. He left WWWF in 1973.

He returned to WWF (formerly WWWF) in 1982 where he was managed by "Classy" Freddie Blassie. Stevens and Captain Lou Albano turned on Jimmy "Superfly" Snuka (Albano was Snuka's manager) in late 1982. This angle had the Crippler piledriving Snuka onto the concrete floor (before padding was introduced) two consecutive times. Also he feuded with WWF Heavyweight Champion Bob Backlund in early 1983. At this stage of his career, the mounting physical abuse after years on the road, with multiple injuries, difficulty in maintaining optimum conditioning, and his advancing age, along with promoters beginning to favor the use of more muscular physiques, had clearly begun to take its toll. He left the company in 1983. Stevens also briefly did color commentary alongside Vince McMahon in 1984.

=== Return to AWA and Later career (1983-1994) ===
After leaving the WWF, Stevens returned to the AWA, where he joined forces with Larry Zbyszko in feuding with the babyface-turned Bockwinkel, only to turn face himself after Zbyszko turned on him. Stevens was doing color commentary for ESPN's AWA Championship Wrestling during the AWA World Heavyweight title match between champion Bockwinkel and Curt Hennig in San Francisco on May 2, 1987, when interference by Zbyszko (who handed a roll of coins to Hennig from ringside to use against Bockwinkel) led to Hennig winning the title from Bockwinkel. Stevens and Bockwinkel protested the outcome of the match to the AWA Championship Committee, which held up the championship immediately after the match, but the original match decision was upheld days later after the committee ruled that there was no evidence that Zbyszko had illegally aided Hennig. As a result, the championship was returned to the now heel-turned Hennig. Stevens returned to WWF for the Legends Battle Royal won by Lou Thesz on November 16, 1987. He left the AWA in 1988. Stemming from the events of that match, Stevens feuded briefly with Zbyszko before finishing out his career in 1992, after 42 years.

One of his final appearances was for WCW at Slamboree 1994 with other wrestling greats.

== Legacy ==
On May 20, 2006, Ray "The Crippler" Stevens was posthumously honored by being inducted into the Professional Wrestling Hall of Fame at Amsterdam, New York. He was the first professional wrestler to be selected for induction into two separate categories: Tag team (with Pat Patterson) and Modern Era (for his superlative work as a singles wrestler). He was inducted into the WWE Hall of Fame in 2020 as a part of the Legacy Wing.

== Personal life ==
In 1952, Stevens was married to female wrestler Theresa Theis, who also did some work as Stevens's trainer and helped to hone his skills as a professional wrestler during the initial stage of his career. They were divorced in 1972. He appeared in the 1974 movie The Wrestler and the 1978 Sylvester Stallone movie Paradise Alley.

In 1995, the mayors of San Francisco and Oakland jointly proclaimed April 5 "Ray Stevens Day". Stevens suffered a heart attack in Minnesota in late 1994. In later years, he took part in rodeo performing, motorcycle racing and go-karting, among other endeavors. Stevens was also known for his brawling antics, run-ins with the IRS, and his love for women.

== Death ==
On May 3, 1996, Stevens died of a heart attack in his sleep at his home in Fremont, California, after drinking brandy and beer, and taking pills shortly before he slept. He had quadruple-bypass surgery at Stanford University a year before his death. He was survived by five children: Carl, Timothy, Laura, Roy and Kelly.

== Championships and accomplishments ==
- American Wrestling Alliance
  - AWA United States Heavyweight Championship (7 times)
- American Wrestling Association
  - AWA World Tag Team Championship (4 times) - with Nick Bockwinkel (3) and Pat Patterson (1)
- Big Time Wrestling (San Francisco)
  - NWA United States Heavyweight Championship (San Francisco version) (2 times)
  - NWA World Tag Team Championship (San Francisco version) (5 times) - with Pat Patterson (2), Pepper Gomez (1), Peter Maivia (1), and Moondog Mayne (1)
  - Cow Palace Battle Royal (1969, 1972, 1980)
- Cauliflower Alley Club
  - Other honoree (1995)
- Championship Wrestling from Florida
  - NWA Florida Tag Team Championship (2 times) - with Nick Bockwinkel (1) and Mike Graham (1)
  - NWA Florida Television Championship (2 times)
- Mid-Atlantic Championship Wrestling
  - NWA Mid-Atlantic Heavyweight Championship (1 time)
  - NWA World Tag Team Championship (Mid-Atlantic version) (3 times) - with Greg Valentine (1), Jimmy Snuka (1), and Ivan Koloff (1)
- Midwest Wrestling Association
  - MWA American Tag Team Championship (1 time) - with Don Stevens
  - MWA Ohio Tag Team Championship (2 times) - with Don Stevens (1) and Ed Francis (1)
  - MWA World Junior Heavyweight Championship (1 time)
- National Wrestling Alliance
  - NWA Hall of Fame (Class of 2013)
- NWA Mid-Pacific Promotions
  - NWA United States Heavyweight Championship (Hawaii version) (1 time)
- NWA Mid-America
  - NWA Southern Junior Heavyweight Championship (3 times)
- NWA Western States Sports
  - NWA Brass Knuckles Championship (Amarillo version) (3 times)
- Professional Wrestling Hall of Fame
  - Class of 2006 Inducted under Modern Era and under Tag Team as a member of The Blond Bombers.
- Pro Wrestling Illustrated
  - PWI Tag Team of the Year (1973) with Nick Bockwinkel
  - PWI Tag Team of the Year (1980) with Jimmy Snuka
- World Championship Wrestling (Australia)
  - IWA World Heavyweight Championship (2 times)
  - IWA World Tag Team Championship (1 time) - with Art Nelson
- World Wide Wrestling Federation / WWE
  - WWWF United States Heavyweight Championship (1 time)
  - WWE Hall of Fame (Class of 2020)
- Wrestling Observer Newsletter
  - Wrestling Observer Newsletter Hall of Fame (Class of 1996)
