= 50th State Big Time Wrestling =

American professional wrestling promotion

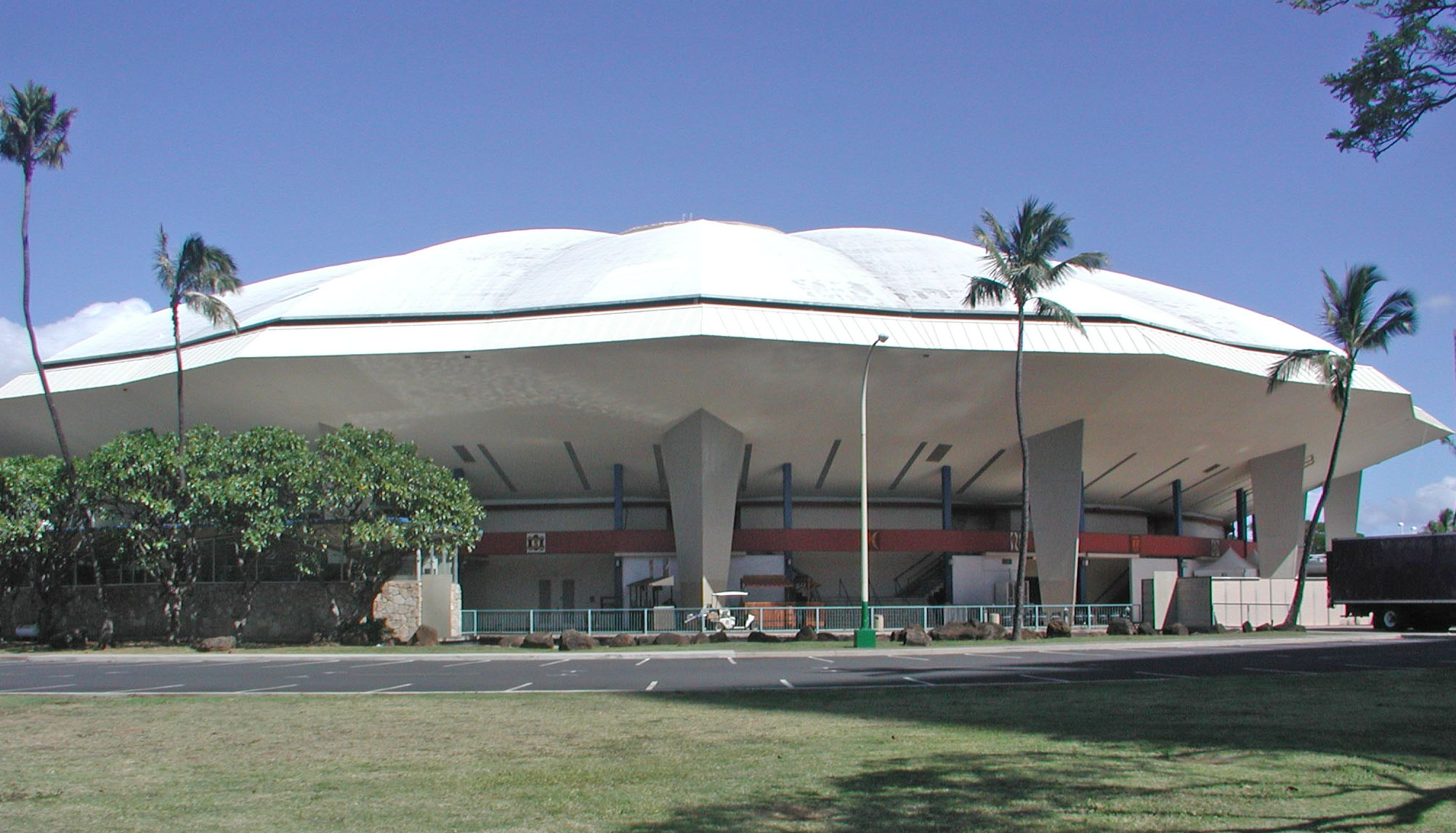
- The Neal S. Blaisdell Arena, formerly known as the Honolulu International Center, which was the home of 50th State Big Time Wrestling in the late 1970s.
- Founded: 1936
- Defunct: 1988
- Headquarters: Honolulu, Hawaii, United States
- Founder: Al Karasick
- Owner(s): Al Karasick (1936–1961); Ed Francis (1961–1979); Steve Rickard (1979–1980); Peter Maivia (1980–1982); Lia Maivia (1982–1988)
- Parent: Mid-Pacific Promotions
- Formerly: 50th State Big Time Wrestling (1936-1979); Polynesian Pro Wrestling (1980-1988)

50th State Big Time Wrestling (sometimes referred to as NWA Hawaii or Mid-Pacific Promotions) was a professional wrestling promotion headquartered in Honolulu, Hawaii in the United States that promoted professional wrestling matches throughout Hawaii. The promotion was founded by Al Karasick in 1936 and became a member of the National Wrestling Alliance in 1949. In 1961, Karasick sold the promotion to "Gentleman" Ed Francis. Along with his business partner Lord James Blears, Francis created a "golden age" of professional wrestling in Hawaii that lasted throughout the 1960s and early 1970s, with 50th State Big Time Wrestling becoming one of Hawaii's most-watched programs. In 1979, Francis sold the promotion to Steve Rickard, who one year later sold it to Peter Maivia, who renamed it Polynesian Pro Wrestling (sometimes referred to as Polynesian Championship Wrestling). The promotion came to an end in 1988.

== History ==
=== Mid-Pacific Promotions (1936–1961) ===
Mid-Pacific Promotions was founded in 1936 by Russian emigrant Al Karasick. Assisted by booker Bobby Bruns, Karasick staged weekly shows in Honolulu's Civic Auditorium, which he managed. Thanks to Hawaii's tropical climate, Mid-Pacific Promotions emerged as a popular destination for wrestlers looking for a "working vacation", with high-profile wrestlers such as Lou Thesz and Rikidōzan visiting Hawaii. In 1949, Karasick joined the National Wrestling Alliance. In the early-1950s, Karasick began expanding into Japan, lobbying NWA president Sam Muchnick to recognise Japan as his territory. By the 1960s, Hawaii was established as a hub for American wrestlers travelling to and from Japan.

=== 50th State Big Time Wrestling (1961–1982) ===
In 1961, Karasick retired from promoting, selling the territory to "Gentleman" Ed Francis, who rebranded it "50th State Big Time Wrestling". Francis continued promoting weekly Wednesday shows at the Civic Auditorium, with the venue regularly sold-out. Shortly after Francis took over the promotion, a bout between Native Hawaiian wrestler King Curtis Iaukea and Samoan wrestler Neff Maiava resulted in a violent riot. Francis appointed Lord James Blears as booker, with Blears quickly gaining a name for his "outrageous" and "goofy" characters. The promotion's top stars included Johnny Barend, Curtis Iaukea, Don Muraco, Neff Maiava, Peter Maivia, and Sammy Steamboat. The promotion helped introduce several concepts that later became ubiquitous in professional wrestling, including the steel cage match and the backstage interview. Johnny Barend became infamous for his outlandish interviews, which began with him emerging from a coffin while smoking a cigar. In 1967, Barend married Annie Lum in the ring at the Honolulu International Center shortly before a title match.

Francis secured a Saturday afternoon live television slot on KHVH-TV. As the promotion increased in popularity, it moved to KGMB and increased its output to two programs a week: a taped show featuring interviews, vignettes and replays on Friday nights and a live show on Saturday afternoons. Hosted by Francis and Blears, 50th State Wrestling was at one point the most watched television program in Hawaii. Television tapings rotated between Hawaii, Kauai, and Maui. In 1973, the television program changed to International All-star Wrestling, a 90 minute show airing on KGMB each Saturday.

After the Civic Coliseum closed in 1974, Francis ceased promoting for three years. In June 1977, he revived the promotion in the Honolulu International Center and the Bloch Arena. With costs rising and revenues falling, Francis sold the promotion to Steve Rickard in April 1979 and retired from promoting. With Francis no longer promoting, Verne Gagne's American Wrestling Association expanded into Hawaii.

Rickard ran weekly events at the Bloch Arena and monthly events at the Neal S. Blaisdell Arena, retaining Lord James Blears as his booker and commentator. He operated the promotion for around one year before selling his territorial rights to Peter Maivia.

=== Polynesian Pro Wrestling (1982–1988) ===
Peter Maivia renamed the promotion "Polynesian Pro Wrestling". Following Maivia's death in June 1982, his wife Lia Maivia took over the promotion. In August 1985, Polynesian Pro Wrestling's "A Hot Summer Night" event drew thousands of fans to the Aloha Stadium, however "A Hot Summer Night II" the following August was markedly less successful. In the late-1980s, the promotion suffered from a lack of large cities to promote in Hawaii, high costs of bringing in wrestlers with star power, and a lawsuit from a competitor. The promotion ultimately folded in 1988.

== Championships ==
Championship	Created	Abandoned	Notes
NWA Hawaii Heavyweight Championship	1937	1979	The original Hawaii Heavyweight Championship was created in 1917. The revived version was established in 1937 when Oki Shikina won a tournament. The championship was vacated in 1979 when 50th State Big Time Wrestling was sold. The championship was briefly resurrected in 1979-1980 and again in 2000.
NWA Hawaii Tag Team Championship	1952	1979	The Hawaii Tag Team Championship was created in 1952 when Bobby Bruns and Lucky Simunovich won a tournament. The championship was vacated in 1979 when 50th State Big Time Wrestling was sold. The championship was resurrected in 2000.
NWA Pacific International Championship	1962	1979	This championship was created in 1962 as the NWA United States Heavyweight Championship (Hawaii version). In 1968, it was renamed the NWA North American Championship (Hawaii version). In 1978, it was renamed again to the NWA Pacific International Championship. The championship was vacated in 1979 when 50th State Big Time Wrestling was sold. The championship was briefly resurrected in 1980.

== Alumni ==
- Johnny Barend
- Dick Beyer
- Joe Blanchard
- Lord James Blears
- Nick Bockwinkel
- Russ Francis
- Mr. Fujiwara
- Giant Baba
- Ripper Collins
- Jim Hady
- Hard Boiled Haggerty
- King Curtis Iaukea
- Killer Kowalski
- Pampero Firpo
- Neff Maiava
- The Missing Link
- Sweet Daddy Siki
- Sammy Steamboat
- Ray Stevens
- Tosh Togo
- Maurice Vachon
- Bill Watts
- Billy White Wolf

== Works ==
- Ed Francis (2012) Gentleman Ed Francis Presents: 50th State Big Time Wrestling!
