= Buddy Rogers (wrestler) =

American professional wrestler (1921–1992)

- Rogers in 1985

Personal information
- Born: Herman Gustav Rohde Jr. February 20, 1921 Camden, New Jersey, U.S.
- Died: June 26, 1992 (aged 71) Fort Lauderdale, Florida, U.S.
- Spouse: Ruth "Debbie" Nixon
- Military service
- Allegiance: United States
- Branch: United States Navy
- Conflicts: World War II

Professional wrestling career
- Ring name(s): Buddy Rogers; Dutch Rogers; Herman Rohde
- Billed height: 6 ft 0 in (183 cm)
- Billed weight: 235 lb (107 kg)
- Billed from: Camden, New Jersey
- Trained by: Joe Cox; Fred Grubmeyer
- Debut: July 4, 1939
- Retired: September 17, 1983

Buddy Rogers (born Herman Gustav Rohde Jr.; February 20, 1921 – June 26, 1992), better known by the ring name "Nature Boy" Buddy Rogers, was an American professional wrestler who was one of the biggest professional wrestling stars in the beginning of the television era. His performances influenced future professional wrestlers, including "Nature Boy" Ric Flair, who used Rogers's nickname, as well as his look, attitude and finishing hold, the figure-four leglock. He was also known for his rivalry with Lou Thesz, both in and out of the ring.

Rogers was a two-time world champion, notably holding the National Wrestling Alliance's NWA World's Heavyweight Championship and the World Wide Wrestling Federation's WWWF Championship; he is one of four men in history to have held both championships, along with Ric Flair, AJ Styles and Cody Rhodes.

== Early life ==
Rogers was the son of Herman Gustav Rohde Sr., and Frieda Stech, both German immigrants. He grew up in Camden, New Jersey. He was athletic, and took up wrestling at age nine at the local YMCA, joining the Camden YMCA Wrestling League and winning its heavyweight championship. He served in the U.S. Navy and worked in a shipyard during World War II. Rogers also excelled in football, boxing, track and swimming, winning the YMCA's three-mile swimming championship in 1937. Rogers joined the Dale Brothers Circus as a wrestler at age 17. He later worked at a shipyard, and became a police officer.

== Professional wrestling career ==
=== Early career and National Wrestling Alliance (1939–1961) ===
Rogers visited the offices of professional wrestling promoters Ray and Frank Hanley, who gave him his first match on July 4, 1939, against Moe Brazen, which he won. Rogers soon became a top professional wrestler using his real name around his hometown as Dutch Rhode, where he gained his first major win over Ed "Strangler" Lewis. He continued his career in Houston, where he assumed the name Buddy Rogers. Rogers would get his first title during his tenure there, winning the NWA Texas Heavyweight Championship four times, once from Lou Thesz, beginning a long feud between them both in and out of the ring.

After leaving the Texas territory for Columbus, Ohio, Rogers bleached his hair, and was given the moniker "Natural Guy" by promoter Jack Pfefer. The moniker later evolved to "Nature Boy". In the early 1950s, Lillian Ellison (under the moniker Slave Girl Moolah) worked as his valet. Ellison claims that the partnership ended after Rogers pushed for a sexual relationship, which Ellison refused. With the advent of television, Rogers's flashy look, great physique and bombastic personality instantly caught the ire of audiences. The first sign of Rogers's impact was his involvement in Sam Muchnick's opposition promotion in St. Louis, Missouri, a major professional wrestling market at the time. He was pitted against Lou Thesz as a draw. In the end, Muchnick's promotion was powerful enough with Rogers as its main star that the two promotions merged. Rogers continued control of the Midwest as a booker and professional wrestler, most notably in Chicago, frequently selling out the 11,000-seat arena. In the 1950s, Rogers expanded into Vincent J. McMahon's Capitol Wrestling Corporation (CWC). He also wrestled in the Al Haft promotion out of Columbus, Ohio in the 1950s and through 1963.

=== NWA World Heavyweight Champion; NWA United States Tag Team Champion (1961–1963) ===
In 1961, the National Wrestling Alliance (NWA) voted him into an NWA World Heavyweight Championship match. On June 30, 1961, Rogers took the title from Pat O'Connor in front of 38,622 fans at Comiskey Park, which set a new North American professional wrestling attendance record that stood until the David Von Erich Memorial Parade of Champions in 1984. In addition, the $148,000 gate in ticket sales was a professional wrestling record for almost twenty years. The contest, which was a two out of three falls match, was billed as the "Match of the Century", during which both men had gained a pinfall. However, when O'Connor missed a dropkick and hit his head, Rogers pinned him to win the match and being recognized as the new NWA World Heavyweight Champion. A rematch was set between the two for the title months later, where Rogers retained it. At the time, Rogers was working at two different jobs in Chicago, but he never walked into work again according to his autobiography.

Many promoters felt that Rogers favored northeastern promoters over other territories. Promoters and noted shooters Bill Miller and Karl Gotch confronted Rogers in Columbus and broke his hand.

Rogers sustained another injury in Montreal against Killer Kowalski, which kept Rogers on the sidelines. Upon his return, the NWA voted to switch the title back over to Lou Thesz, who publicly disliked Rogers. On January 24, 1963, the match took place in Toronto. Rogers was hesitant about dropping the title, so promoter Sam Muchnick put three safeguards in place to guarantee Rogers's cooperation. The first safeguard was formatting the match as a one fall finish, rather than the traditional best two out of three falls. The second safeguard was his threat to give Rogers's bond away to charity, rather than returning the deposit to the dethroned Rogers. Every NWA World Heavyweight Champion was required to pay a $25,000 deposit to the NWA Board of Directors, before winning the championship belt. The deposit was held by the NWA for the duration of the champion's reign. The third safeguard was Thesz, who could "take" the title if necessary. Ultimately, Thesz won the match and the title.

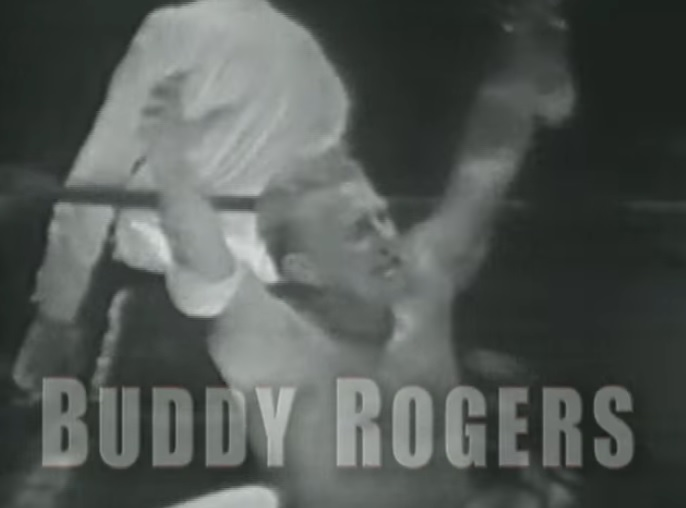
Buddy Rogers from Classic Wrestling

Rogers was a co-holder of the NWA United States Tag Team Championship with tag team partner "Handsome" Johnny Barend. They won the championship on July 5, 1962, from Johnny Valentine and “Cowboy” Bob Ellis on Capitol Wrestling's regular Thursday night Washington, D.C., television show. Arnold Skaaland was a last minute replacement for Ellis whose flight was delayed and unable to get to the arena. With the championship on the line, Rogers and Barend isolated Skaaland whom Rogers forced to submit with his figure-four leglock to win the first fall. After Skaaland was carried from the ring on a stretcher, Valentine continued to fight alone in the second fall. Valentine fought valiantly, but was worn down by Rogers and Barend. Just when it looked like Valentine was going to succumb to the vicious attack of the heels the crowd erupted. The television cameras swung from a view of the ring to "Cowboy" Bob Ellis running down the aisle in street clothes and carrying a travel suitcase. Ellis jumped into the ring, applied multiple bulldog headlocks and pinned Barend to win the second fall for his team. The third fall featured everyone fighting inside and outside the ring. Finally, Ellis and Barend collided in the corner and knocked each other out. The referee was distracted by Valentine trying to get into the ring as Rogers grabbed an unconscious Barend by his hair and back of his trunks and threw him on top of Ellis for the victory. Rogers and Barend defeated Valentine and Ellis in a title rematch at Madison Square Garden on July 13, 1962. They defended the championship until March 7, 1963, when they lost to Killer Buddy Austin and The Great Scott on Capitol Wrestling's regular Thursday night television broadcast. Rogers and Barend split briefly and feuded, but they reunited that summer to defeat Bobo Brazil and Bruno Sammartino in a best two out of three falls tag team match. During the Rogers–Barend feud, Rogers regularly teamed with a masked wrestler, The Shadow. Prior to his title reign with Barend, Rogers frequently teamed with the "Big O" Bob Orton. During the 1950s, Rogers's main tag team partner was The Great Scott.

=== World Wide Wrestling Federation and semi-retirement (1963–1969) ===
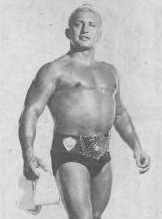
Rogers as the inaugural WWWF World Heavyweight Champion in 1963

After Thesz defeated Rogers for the NWA World Heavyweight Championship, Northeast promoters Toots Mondt and Vincent J. McMahon withdrew their NWA membership and formed the World Wide Wrestling Federation (WWWF, now WWE). The promoters felt that Thesz was not a strong draw in their territory, therefore the WWWF billed Rogers as their world champion as did Fred Kohler's Chicago promotion from January 25. Rogers was formally recognized as the first ever WWWF World Heavyweight Champion on April 11, 1963, when promoter and first WWWF President Willie Gilzenberg handed Rogers the WWWF World Heavyweight Championship belt on Washington, D.C., television. Gilzenberg explained that Rogers won a wrestling tournament in Rio de Janeiro, Brazil, although it was fictional. WWE.com currently cites April 25, 1963, as the beginning of Rogers's reign. Rogers was a top draw, but his reign was ultimately cut short by a mild heart attack which greatly hindered his endurance and in-ring performance. Vincent J. McMahon and Toots Mondt were in a panic and hid Rogers's medical problems. In an emergency title switch, Rogers lost to Bruno Sammartino in a quick 48 second match on May 17, 1963, in Madison Square Garden. The match had to be kept short for fear of Rogers having a major heart attack and dying in the ring.

Following his loss to Sammartino, health problems forced Rogers to wrestle in only a limited number of short singles matches that lasted a minute or two. He participated in a few tag team matches with partner Handsome Johnny Barend where he spent almost the entire match in his corner on the ring apron while Barend did the wrestling. Rogers defeated Hans "The Great" Mortier in less than a minute with the figure-four leglock in Madison Square Garden and teamed with Handsome Johnny Barend to take two out of three falls via pin from Sammartino and Bobo Brazil, with Rogers pinning Sammartino for the final fall. The big rematch was to be held October 4, 1963, at Roosevelt Stadium in Jersey City, New Jersey. The tickets were printed with Rogers–Sammartino on them. However, it was announced that Rogers was retiring and Gorilla Monsoon, who had won a tournament, got the title shot that night. In 1966–1967, Rogers wrestled in 18 short matches in Canada. In 1969, Rogers appeared in 19 quick matches in an Ohio-based promotion called Wrestling Show Classics before he realized his health was not getting better to the point where he could wrestle. He spent time on television talking with his former manager Bobby Davis. A decade later, Rogers would try to make a legitimate comeback.

=== Jim Crockett Promotions and return to WWF (1978–1992) ===
In 1979, Rogers returned to wrestling as a fan favorite in Florida, although he was in his late 50s. He later moved up to Jim Crockett Promotions (JCP) in the Carolinas as a villain manager overseeing professional wrestlers like Jimmy Snuka, Ken Patera, Gene Anderson, Dewey Robertson and Big John Studd. His most notable moment during his run in the Carolinas was his feud with the new "Nature Boy" Ric Flair, before Rogers put over Flair on July 9, 1978.

After his time in Mid-Atlantic Championship Wrestling (MACW), Rogers moved back into WWF where he was a fan favorite manager and part-time professional wrestler who also hosted the interview segment "Rogers' Corner" until 1983. Rogers was instrumental in helping turn Jimmy Snuka into a fan favorite, leading to Rogers managing Snuka for his feud with Lou Albano and Ray Stevens. Rogers wrestled his last ever match on September 17, 1983, teaming with Snuka to defeat Albano and the Magnificent Muraco in Baltimore, Maryland. During the feud, Rogers broke his hip and retired from professional wrestling for good. His show was replaced by "Victory Corner", which would later be replaced by "Piper's Pit".

Rogers would continue to make sporadic appearances in the WWF until 1984, right before the beginning of the Rock 'n' Wrestling era. At the age of 71, Rogers was set to wrestle yet another "Nature Boy", this time Buddy Landel, in a comeback match for the Tri-State Wrestling Alliance (TWA, a predecessor of Extreme Championship Wrestling – ECW) in early 1992, but the promotion went out of business and the match never occurred.

== Personal life ==
Rogers married Ruth "Debbie" Nixon in 1969 and subsequently adopted her son, David Buddy Rogers, as his own. When Rogers retired from wrestling, he took a job as a manager at a Playboy Club casino. He resided in Haddonfield, New Jersey, until he moved to Fort Lauderdale, Florida, in 1987.

In 1989, while Rogers was eating a turkey sandwich at a hoagie shop in Florida, a 6-foot-2-inch (188 cm) 230-pound (100 kg) man in his late 20s began verbally abusing two female employees. Rogers told the man to stop shouting, but the man called him “old” and challenged him to a fight. Rogers proceeded to push the man into a wall, leading to the man throwing a chair at him. Rogers fought back and threw the man five feet into a refrigerator. Rogers then hit him in the stomach, knocking him into the kitchen. He then held onto Rogers' hair repeatedly telling him to stop, fleeing the shop afterwards. Rogers, who received 14 stitches after the fight, stated to a reporter that the man calling him “old” was the worst part of the incident, then saying "Hell, I'm only 68, that's not so old."

== Death ==
In early 1992, Rogers’ health deteriorated. He had a broken arm from a fall and suffered three strokes, two of them occurring on the same day. At his own request he was not placed on life-support and died on June 26, 1992, at the age of 71. Other reports suggest that his death was as the result of a heart attack. He had previously suffered a fall at a supermarket and subsequently underwent heart-bypass surgery.

== Legacy ==
Lou Thesz, Rogers's long-time colleague and frequent opponent, described Rogers's early impact in his memoir, Hooker:

Rogers is remembered by fans and performers alike as one of the top all-time stars in the business, but it's probably not common knowledge just how influential he was... he broke into the business somewhere around 1941 as a hero-type personality, with little more going for him than a good body and natural charisma in the ring – which is actually a pretty good beginning – and he was a hit almost from the start. He had that indefinable something fans responded to, and he was sharp enough to build upon what he had, paying attention to what got a reaction from the fans. What evolved over several years was the "Nature Boy", the prototype of the cocky, strutting, sneering, arrogant peroxide blond villain that is almost a tired wrestling cliché today. Rogers invented the character, and I believe he did it better than anyone.

Thesz continued,

He was also one of the first guys to rely a lot on what we called "flying" moves in the ring – body slams, dropkicks, piledrivers, ricochets off the ropes into his opponent, action moves that are commonplace today. All of those moves were in use before Rogers came along, but they were used sparingly; most of the wrestling prior to Rogers's emergence was done on the mat. Rogers was the first to use flying moves in quantity, staying off the mat, and the style was so popular with the fans that other wrestlers, including me, followed his lead.

Rogers was one of the first wrestlers to use trash talk instead of the more conventional, respectful interview style. After winning the NWA World Heavyweight Championship from Pat O'Connor in Chicago in 1961, Rogers accepted the title belt and then took the microphone and shouted, "To a nicer guy it couldn't happen!" This phrase would go on to be one of his catchphrases. Trash talk is now the primary style of promo used by heels. In 1994, Rogers was posthumously inducted into the World Wrestling Federation Hall of Fame class of 1994. Fellow professional wrestlers Buddy Landel and Ric Flair adopted the "Nature Boy" gimmick from Rogers as a tribute to him. Flair would also use Roger's signature move, the figure-four leglock, as well as doing variations of the Rogers strut.

== Championships and accomplishments ==
- American Wrestling Association
  - AWA World Heavyweight Championship (Chicago version) (1 time)
- American Wrestling Association (Ohio)
  - AWA World Heavyweight Championship (Ohio version) (3 times)
- American Wrestling Association (New England)
  - AWA Eastern States Heavyweight Championship (1 time)
- Capitol Wrestling Corporation/World Wide Wrestling Federation/World Wrestling Federation
  - WWWF World Heavyweight Championship (1 time, inaugural)
  - NWA United States Heavyweight Championship (Northeast version) (1 time, inaugural)
  - NWA United States Tag Team Championship (Northeast version) (2 times) – with Johnny Valentine (1) and Johnny Barend (1)
  - WWF Hall of Fame (Class of 1994)
- International Professional Wrestling Hall of Fame
  - Class of 2021
- Midwest Wrestling Association
  - MWA Ohio Tag Team Championship (7 times) – with Great Scott (6) and Juan Sebastian (1)
- Jack Pfefer Promotions
  - World Heavyweight Championship (Jack Pfeffer version) (4 times)
- Montreal Athletic Commission
  - World Heavyweight Championship (Montreal version) (3 times)
- National Wrestling Alliance
  - NWA World Heavyweight Championship (1 time)
  - NWA Hall of Fame (class of 2010)
- NWA Chicago
  - NWA United States Heavyweight Championship (Chicago version) (1 time)
- NWA Mid-America
  - NWA Mid-America Heavyweight Championship (1 time, inaugural)
- NWA San Francisco
  - NWA World Tag Team Championship (San Francisco version) (1 time) – with Ronnie Etchison
- NWA Western States Sports
  - NWA North American Heavyweight Championship (Amarillo version) (1 time)
- Pro Wrestling Illustrated
  - Stanley Weston Award (1990)
- Professional Wrestling Hall of Fame and Museum
  - Class of 2002 (Television Era)
- Southwest Sports Inc.
  - NWA Texas Heavyweight Championship (7 times)^{1}
  - NWA Texas Tag Team Championship (1 time) – with Otto Kuss
- St. Louis Wrestling Hall of Fame
  - Class of 2008
- World Wide Wrestling Alliance
  - WWWA World Heavyweight Championship (1 time)
- Wrestling Observer Newsletter
  - Wrestling Observer Newsletter Hall of Fame (Class of 1996)
- Other titles
  - Maryland Eastern Heavyweight Championship (12 times)
- Victory Championship Wrestling
  - VCW Hall of Fame (Class of 2018)

^{1} Five of Rogers's six reigns with the NWA Texas Heavyweight Championship occurred before the title came under the control of the NWA and before the NWA was created. The situation is the same regarding Rogers's reign with the NWA Texas Tag Team Championship.
