= Professional Wrestling Hall of Fame and Museum =

Hall of fame and museum in Texas, US

Coordinates: 33.912113°N 98.492014°W

The Professional Wrestling Hall of Fame (PWHF) and Museum was an American professional wrestling hall of fame and museum located in Wichita Falls, Texas; following the postponement of its 19th induction ceremony, planned for May 2020, and an announced temporary closure to expand the museum, its status was changed to "closed due to water leaks" in 2021, and never re-opened.

The museum was founded by Tony Vellano in 1999, and was previously in Amsterdam, New York and Schenectady, New York. Its purpose was to "preserve and promote the dignified history of professional wrestling and to enshrine and pay tribute to professional wrestlers who have advanced this national pastime in terms of athletics and entertainment." It was not affiliated with any professional wrestling promotion.

== Categories ==
Name	Years active	Notes
Pioneer Era	2002–2021	For wrestlers active between the mid-19th century and 1946
Television Era	2002–2021	For wrestlers active between the years of 1947 and 1984
Modern Era	2002–2021	For wrestlers active between the years of 1985 to present day
Tag Team	2003–2021	For tag team wrestlers
International	2006–2021	For wrestlers from another country, or who mainly wrestled throughout other countries than the US.
Midget Wrestler	2002–2005	For midget professional wrestlers
Lady Wrestler	2002–2021	For female professional wrestlers
Colleague/Territory Division	2003–2021	For managers, valets, announcers, photographers, and those wrestlers who were the "journeymen" for the business; formerly known as the Non-Participant Division.
Referee Division	2018–2021	Strictly for referees
Executive Division	2018–2021	For bookers, promoters, business executives, and historians. Those who were Non-Participant Division inductees who would be classified as Executives under 2018 changes will be designated as such.
New York State Award	2003–2005	For individuals who made significant contributions to professional wrestling in the PWHF's home state of New York
Senator Hugh Farley Award	2006–2009	For well-known wrestlers who have made significant societal contributions outside of the squared circle; named after New York State Senator Hugh Farley

== Inductees ==
Year	Ring name (Birth name)	Category	Notes
2002	Frank Gotch	Pioneer Era	Posthumous inductee: won the World Heavyweight Wrestling Championship (1 time) and the American Heavyweight Championship (3 times)
2002	George Hackenschmidt	Pioneer Era	Posthumous inductee: won the European Greco-Roman Heavyweight Championship (1 time) and the World Heavyweight Wrestling Championship (1 time)
2002	Ed Lewis (Robert Herman Julius Friedrich)	Pioneer Era	Posthumous inductee: won the Boston version of the AWA World Heavyweight Championship 2 times, and the World Heavyweight Championship (4 times)
2002	Jim Londos (Christos Theofilou)	Pioneer Era	Posthumous inductee: won the World Heavyweight Wrestling Championship (1 time) and the NWA/NBA World Heavyweight Championship (1 time)
2002	Joe Stecher	Pioneer Era	Posthumous inductee: won the World Heavyweight Wrestling Championship (3 times)
2002	Lou Thesz (Aloysius Martiz Thesz)	Pioneer Era	Posthumous inductee: won the World Heavyweight Wrestling Championship (3 times), the World Heavyweight Championship (NWA) (3 times), and the NWA World Heavyweight Championship (5 times)
2002	Gorgeous George (George Raymond Wagner)	Television Era	Posthumous inductee: won the NWA Southern Heavyweight Championship (1 time), the NWA Southeastern Heavyweight Championship (1 time), and the Boston version of the AWA World Heavyweight Championship (1 time)
2002	Buddy Rogers (Herman Gustav Rohde Jr.)	Television Era	Posthumous inductee: won the NWA World Heavyweight Championship (1 time) and was the first to hold the WWWF World Heavyweight Championship
2002	Bruno Sammartino	Television Era	Won the WWWF World Heavyweight Championship (2 times) and WWWF United States Tag Team Championship (1 time)
2002	André the Giant (André René Roussimoff)	Modern Era	Posthumous inductee: won the WWF Championship (1 time) and the WWF Tag Team Championship (1 time)
2002	Ricky Steamboat (Richard Henry Blood)	Modern Era	Won the NWA World Heavyweight Championship (1 time), NWA/WCW World Tag Team Championship (Mid-Atlantic version) (8 times), WWF Intercontinental Championship (1 time), NWA (Mid-Atlantic)/WCW United States Heavyweight Championship (4 times), and NWA (Mid-Atlantic)/NWA/WCW Television Championship (4 times)
2002	Sky Low Low (Marcel Gauthier)	Midget Wrestler	Posthumous inductee: won the NWA World Midget's Championship (1 time)
2002	Mildred Burke (Mildred Bliss)	Lady Wrestler	Posthumous inductee: won the NWA World Women's Championship (1 time) and the WWWA World Heavyweight Championship; founded World Women's Wrestling Association
2003	Martin Burns	Pioneer Era	Posthumous inductee: won the American Heavyweight Championship (1 time)
2003	Stanislaus Zbyszko (Jan Stanislaw Cyganiewicz)	Pioneer Era	Posthumous inductee: won the AAC World Heavyweight Championship (2 times)
2003	Killer Kowalski (Edward Władysław Spulnik)	Television Era	Won the WWWF World Tag Team Championship (1 time)
2003	Antonino Rocca (Antonio Biasetton)	Television Era	Posthumous inductee: Won the NWA Texas Heavyweight Championship (2 times) and the WWWF United States Tag Team Championship (1 time)
2003	Nick Bockwinkel	Modern Era	Won the AWA World Heavyweight Championship (4 times) and the AWA Southern Heavyweight Championship (1 time)
2003	Hulk Hogan (Terry Gene Bollea)	Modern Era	Won the WWE Championship (6 times) and WCW World Heavyweight Championship (6 times), Royal Rumble 1990, 1991
2003	Al Costello (Giacomo Costa)	Tag Team	Posthumous inductee: inducted as a member of The Fabulous Kangaroos with Roy Heffernan; Won the WWWF United States Tag Team Championship (3 times)
2003	Roy Heffernan (Laurence Roy Heffernan)	Tag Team	Posthumous inductee: inducted as a member of The Fabulous Kangaroos with Al Costello; Won the WWWF United States Tag Team Championship (3 times)
2003	Little Beaver (Lionel Giroux)	Midget Wrestler	Posthumous inductee: won the NWA World Midget's Championship (2 times)
2003	The Fabulous Moolah (Mary Lillian Ellison)	Lady Wrestler	Was the inaugural WWE Women's Champion (4 times), her first reign is officially recognized as lasting over 10,000 days
2003	Sam Muchnick	Executive	Posthumous inductee: promoted the St. Louis Wrestling Club and assisted in establishing the National Wrestling Alliance (NWA)
2003	Dick Beyer	New York State Award	Was also inducted to the PWHF in 2005, won the WWA World Heavyweight Championship (3 times), and AWA World Heavyweight Championship (1 time)
2003	Ilio DiPaolo	New York State Award	Posthumous inductee: won the NWA Canadian Open Tag Team Championship (5 times)
2004	William Muldoon	Pioneer Era	Posthumous inductee: won the Greco-Roman Heavyweight Championship (1 time)
2004	Angelo Savoldi	Pioneer Era	Minor partner of the World Wide Wrestling Federation in the 1970s and founder of International Championship Wrestling
2004	Freddie Blassie	Television Era	Posthumous inductee: NWA Southern Heavyweight Championship (Georgia version) (14 times)
2004	Verne Gagne	Television Era	Founded the American Wrestling Association and won the AWA World Heavyweight Championship (10 times)
2004	Terry Funk	Modern Era	Won the NWA World Heavyweight Championship (1 time), the ECW Championship (2 times), and the WWF Tag Team Championship (1 time)
2004	Harley Race	Modern Era	Won the NWA World Heavyweight Championship (8 times), AWA World Tag Team Championship (3 times), NWA {Mid-Atlantic}|WCW United States Champion|first champion, NWA Missouri Champion (7 times).
2004	Maurice Vachon	Tag Team	Inducted as a part of a tag team with Paul Vachon; won the AWA World Heavyweight Championship (5 times), AWA World Tag Team Championship (2 times) and NWA International Tag Team Championship (Calgary version) (3 times)
2004	Paul Vachon	Tag Team	Inducted as a part of a tag team with Maurice Vachon; won the AWA World Tag Team Championship (2 times) and NWA International Tag Team Championship (Calgary version) (3 times)
2004	Lord Littlebrook (Eric Tovey)	Midget Wrestler	Won the NWA World Midget's Championship (1 time)
2004	Mae Young	Lady Wrestler	Trained The Fabulous Moolah, challenged for the NWA World Women's Championship, and wrestled in nine different decades
2004	Vincent J. McMahon	Executive	Posthumous inductee: established the World Wide Wrestling Federation (now WWE)
2004	Gordon Solie (Francis Jonard Labiak)	Colleague	Posthumous inductee: announcer for Championship Wrestling from Georgia, Championship Wrestling from Florida, Continental Championship Wrestling, and World Championship Wrestling
2004	Dr. John J. Bonica	New York State Award	Posthumous inductee: Won the NWA Light Heavyweight Championship of the World (1 time) and Light Heavyweight Championship of Canada (1 time)
2004	Len Rossi (Len Rositano)	New York State Award	Won the North American Jr. Heavyweight Championship (1 time) and the NWA Southern Junior Heavyweight Championship (1 time)
2005	Orville Brown	Pioneer Era	Posthumous Inductee: won the NWA World Heavyweight Championship (inaugural, 2 times), MWA World Heavyweight Championship (1 time)
2005	John Pesek	Pioneer Era	Posthumous inductee: won the NWA World Heavyweight Championship (1 time) and MWA World Heavyweight Championship (1 time)
2005	Dick Beyer	Television Era	Was also awarded the PWHF New York State Award in 2003, won the WWA World Heavyweight Championship (3 times), and AWA World Heavyweight Championship (1 time)
2005	Jack Brisco (Freddy Brisco)	Television Era	Won the NCAA Wrestling Team Championship (1 time), NWA World Heavyweight Championship (2 times), and NWA Florida Tag Team Championship (10 times)
2005	Dory Funk Jr.	Modern Era	Won the NWA World Heavyweight Championship (1 time) and NWA Florida Heavyweight Championship (4 times)
2005	George Steele (William Myers)	Modern Era	Won the NWA World Tag Team Championship (Detroit version) (1 time)
2005	Dick the Bruiser (William Afflis)	Tag Team	Posthumous inductee: Inducted as a part of a tag team with Crusher, won the AWA World Tag Team Championship (5 times) and the WWA World Heavyweight Championship (11 times)
2005	Crusher (Reginald Lisowski)	Tag Team	Posthumous inductee: Inducted as a part of a tag team with Dick the Bruiser, won the AWA World Tag Team Championship (5 times) and AWA World Heavyweight Championship (3 times)
2005	Fuzzy Cupid (Leon Stap)	Midget Wrestler	Posthumous inductee: worked tag team matches in various independent circuits
2005	Penny Banner	Lady Wrestler	Won AWA World Women's Championship (1 time) and NWA Women's World Tag Team Championship (3 times).
2005	Paul Boesch	Colleague	Posthumous inductee: commentator for the Houston Wrestling promotion
2005	Mike Mazurki	New York State Award	Posthumous inductee: founded the Cauliflower Alley Club, a non-profit organization that awards scholarships to wrestlers and gives financial aid to retired wrestlers
2005	Ray Stern (Walter Bookbinder)	New York State Award	Won the NWA World Tag Team Championship (San Francisco version) (1 time)
2006	Ed Don George	Pioneer Era	Posthumous inductee; won the World Heavyweight Wrestling Championship (2 times) and the Boston version of the AWA World Heavyweight Championship (1 time)
2006	Wild Bill Longson	Pioneer Era	Posthumous inductee; won the NWA World Heavyweight Championship (3 times) and the NWA Central States Heavyweight Championship (1 time)
2006	Don Leo Jonathan (Don Heaton)	Television Era	Won the NWA Canadian Tag Team Championship (Vancouver version) (18 times) and NWA Texas Heavyweight Championship (2 times)
2006	Johnny Valentine (Jonathan Wisniski)	Television Era	Posthumous inductee; won the NWA United States Heavyweight Championship (Mid-Atlantic version) (1 time) and NWA Florida Heavyweight Championship (3 times)
2006	Ric Flair (Richard Morgan Fliehr)	Modern Era	Held the NWA World Heavyweight Championship (10 times), WCW World Heavyweight Championship (8 times), and WWF World Heavyweight Championship, (2 times, NWA (Mid-Atlantic)/WCW United States Heavyweight Championship (6 times)^{1}, and NWA World Tag Team Championship (Mid-Atlantic version) (3 times), NWA (Mid-Atlantic)/NWA Television Championship (1 time), WWE Intercontinental Championship (1 time), Royal Rumble 1992. World Tag Team Championship (3 times), Royal Rumble 1992
2006	Ray Stevens	Modern Era	Posthumous inductee; Was inducted into the Professional Wrestling Hall of Fame and Museum twice in one year; under Modern Era and Tag Team. Won the AWA United States Heavyweight Championship (7 Times), AWA World Tag Team Championship (4 times)
2006	Pat Patterson	Tag Team	Inducted as member of the Blond Bombers; won the AWA World Tag Team Championship (1 time), the NWA World Tag Team Championship (San Francisco version) (2 times), WWF North American Heavyweight Championship (1 time), and was also the inaugural WWF Intercontinental Heavyweight Champion
2006	Ray Stevens	Tag Team	Posthumous inductee; inducted as member of the Blond Bombers; Was inducted into the Professional Wrestling Hall of Fame and Museum twice in one year; under Modern Era and Tag Team. Won the AWA World Tag Team Championship (1 time) and the NWA World Tag Team Championship (San Francisco version) (2 times)
2006	Rikidōzan (Kim Sin-Nak)	International	Posthumous inductee; won the NWA International Heavyweight Championship (1 time)
2006	June Byers (De Alva Evonne Sibley)	Lady Wrestler	Posthumous inductee; NWA World Women's Championship (1 time) and World Women's Championship (1 time)
2006	Bobby Heenan (Raymond Louis Heenan)	Colleague	Considered by many to be the greatest wrestling manager of all time. He also worked as an announcer for the World Wrestling Federation and World Championship Wrestling
2006	Ida Mae Martinez	Senator Hugh Farley Award	Won the Women's Mexican Championship
2007	Earl Caddock	Pioneer Era	Posthumous inductee: won the Amateur Athletic Union Heavyweight (1 time) and Light Heavyweight Championship (2 times) in amateur wrestling
2007	Gus Sonnenberg	Pioneer Era	Posthumous inductee: won a version of the original World Heavyweight Championship of professional wrestling
2007	Danny Hodge	Television Era	Won the NWA World Junior Heavyweight Championship (8 times)
2007	Pat O'Connor	Television Era	Posthumous inductee: won the NWA World Heavyweight Championship (1 time), NWA United States Heavyweight Championship (Central States version) (3 times), and the AWA World Tag Team Championship (1 time)
2007	Ted DiBiase	Modern Era	Won the WWF World Tag Team Championship (3 times), NWA National Heavyweight Championship (2 times), Mid-South North American Heavyweight Championship (4 times), and WWF North American Heavyweight Championship (1 time)
2007	Roddy Piper (Roderick Toombs)	Modern Era	Won the WWF Intercontinental Heavyweight (1 time), World Tag Team Championship (1 time), NWA (Mid-Atlantic) United States Heavyweight Championship (1 time), and various NWA championships
2007	Chris Tolos	Tag Team	Posthumous inductee; inducted as a member of The Canadian Wrecking Crew, won the WWWF United States Tag Team Championship (1 time), NWA Canadian Tag Team Championship (Vancouver version) (2 times), NWA World Tag Team Championship (Vancouver version) (2 times), and NWA International Tag Team Championship (Toronto version) (2 times)
2007	John Tolos	Tag Team	Inducted as a member of The Canadian Wrecking Crew, won the WWWF United States Tag Team Championship (1 time), NWA Canadian Tag Team Championship (Vancouver version) (7 times), NWA World Tag Team Championship (Vancouver version) (3 times), and NWA International Tag Team Championship (Toronto version) (2 times)
2007	Karl Gotch (Charles Istaz)	International	Posthumous inductee: won the IWA World Heavyweight Championship (1 time) and WWWF World Tag Team Championship (1 time)
2007	Cora Combs (Beulah Mae Combs)	Lady Wrestler	Won the NWA United States Women's Championship (1 time)
2007	Jack Pfefer	Executive	Posthumous inductee: promoted various independent promotions
2007	Billy Darnell	Senator Hugh Farley Award	Posthumous inductee: won different versions of the NWA World Tag Team Championship (3 times)
2008	Tom Jenkins	Pioneer Era	Posthumous inductee; won the American Heavyweight Championship (3 times)
2008	Ray Steele (Peter Sauer)	Pioneer Era	Posthumous inductee; won the World Heavyweight Championship (1 time)
2008	Bobo Brazil (Houston Harris)	Television Era	Posthumous inductee; Was the first African-American world champion (NWA World Heavyweight Championship), and also won the WWWF United States Championship (1 time)
2008	Gene Kiniski	Television Era	Won the NWA World Heavyweight Championship (1 time) and AWA World Heavyweight Championship (1 time)
2008	Bob Backlund	Modern Era	Won the NWA Florida Tag Team Championship (1 time), NWA Georgia Tag Team Championship (1 time), and WWWF/WWF World Heavyweight Championship (2 times), World Tag Team Championship (1 time)
2008	Bret Hart	Modern Era	Won the WWF Championship (5 times), WCW World Heavyweight Championship (2 times), Royal Rumble 1994
2008	Emil Dusek (Emil Hason)	Tag Team	Posthumous inductee; inducted as a member of The Dusek Riot Squad, won the NWA World Tag Team Championship (Central States version) (3 times) and the NWA World Tag Team Championship (San Francisco version) (1 time)
2008	Ernie Dusek (Ernie Hason)	Tag Team	Posthumous inductee; inducted as a member of The Dusek Riot Squad, won the NWA World Tag Team Championship (Central States version) (3 times) and the NWA World Tag Team Championship (San Francisco version) (1 time)
2008	Shohei Baba	International	Posthumous inductee; won the NWA World Heavyweight Championship (3 times) and the PWF World Heavyweight Championship (4 times); founded All Japan Pro Wrestling
2008	Betty Niccoli (Betty Jo Niccoli Sato)	Lady Wrestler	Won the NWA United States Women's Championship (1 time) and the AWA World Women's Championship (1 time)
2008	Toots Mondt	Executive	Posthumous inductee; founded the World Wide Wrestling Federation
2008	Tom Drake	Senator Hugh Farley Award	Was a contender for the NWA World Heavyweight Championship
2009	Evan Lewis	Pioneer Era	Posthumous inductee: won the American Heavyweight Championship (1 time)
2009	Wladek Zbyszko	Pioneer Era	Posthumous inductee: won the AWA World Heavyweight Championship
2009	Superstar Billy Graham (Eldridge Wayne Coleman)	Television Era	Won the WWWF World Heavyweight Championship (1 time), NWA Florida Heavyweight Championship (2 times), and the International Pro Wrestling World Heavyweight Championship (1 time)
2009	Chief Jay Strongbow (Luke Joseph Scarpa)	Television Era	Won the WWF Tag Team Championship (4 times), and various NWA championships
2009	Paul Orndorff	Modern Era	Won the Memphis Wrestling Southern Heavyweight Championship (1 time), NWA/WCW World Tag Team Championship (3 times) WCW World Television Championship (1 time) and many more regional titles
2009	Randy Savage (Randall Poffo)	Modern Era	Won the WWF Championship (2 times), WWF Intercontinental Heavyweight Championship (1 time) WCW World Heavyweight Championship (4 times), and various championships in independent promotions
2009	Don Curtis	Tag Team	Posthumous inductee; inducted as a part of a tag team with Mark Lewin, and won various NWA tag team championships.
2009	Mark Lewin	Tag Team	Inducted as a part of a tag team with Don Curtis, and won various NWA tag team championships.
2009	Antonio Inoki (Kanji Inoki)	International	Won the National Wrestling Federation Heavyweight Championship (4 times), WWF World Martial Arts Heavyweight Championship (2 times), IWGP Heavyweight Championship (1 time, inaugural), and many other titles. Inoki was the founder of New Japan Pro-Wrestling
2009	Donna Christanello (Donna Alfonsi)	Lady Wrestler	Won the NWA Women's World Tag Team Championship (1 time)
2009	Lou Albano	Colleague	Won the WWWF United States Tag Team Championship (1 time), and managed various wrestlers to many WWE singles and tag team titles. reigns
2009	Hank Garrett	Senator Hugh Farley Award	Worked in various independent promotions before pursuing an acting career
2010	Red Berry	Pioneer Era	Posthumous inductee: Won NWA Central States Heavyweight Championship (2 times), and NWA World Light Heavyweight Championship (9 times).
2010	Danny McShain	Pioneer Era	Posthumous inductee: Won NWA Texas Heavyweight Championship (NWA Texas Heavyweight Championship) (6 times), and NWA World Light Heavyweight Championship (10 times).
2010	Édouard Carpentier	Television Era	Won NWA Texas Heavyweight Championship (NWA World Heavyweight Championship) (1 time), and WWA World Heavyweight Championship (Los Angeles version) (2 times).
2010	Wahoo McDaniel	Television Era	Posthumous inductee: Won NWA Mid-Atlantic Heavyweight Championship (5 times), NWA United States Heavyweight Championship (5 times), and IWA World Heavyweight Championship (1 time).
2010	Stan Hansen	Modern Era	Won Triple Crown Heavyweight Championship (4 times), PWF World Heavyweight Championship (4 times), PWF World Tag Team Championship (4 times) AWA World Heavyweight Championship (1 time), NWA International Tag Team Championship (4 times), AJPW World Tag Team Championship (8 times), WCW United States Championship (1 time).
2010	Dusty Rhodes (Virgil Runnels)	Modern Era	Won NWA Florida Heavyweight Championship (10 times), NWA Southern Heavyweight Championship (Florida version) (7 times), NWA World Heavyweight Championship (3 times), NWA World Tag Team Championship {Mid-Atlantic} (2 times}, NWA World Six-Man Tag Team Championship (2 times), NWA United States Heavyweight Championship (1 time), NWA World Television Championship(3 times), and more NWA regional Titles.
2010	Ben Sharpe	Tag Team	Posthumous inductee: Inducted as a part of a tag team with Mike Sharpe, won NWA World Tag Team Championship (San Francisco version) (19 times), WCWA Texas Tag Team Championship (1 time), and NWA Hawaii Heavyweight Championship (1 time).
2010	Mike Sharpe	Tag Team	Posthumous inductee: Inducted as a part of a tag team with Ben Sharpe, won NWA World Tag Team Championship (San Francisco version) (18 times), WCWA Texas Tag Team Championship (1 time), and NWA World Tag Team Championship (Vancouver version) (1 time).
2010	Mil Máscaras (Aaron Rodríguez Arellano)	International	Won Mexican National Light Heavyweight Championship (2 times), WWA World Heavyweight Championship (1 time), All World Heavyweight Championship (1 time) (First & Only), and IWA World Heavyweight Championship (1 time) (First & Only).
2010	Kay Noble	Lady Wrestler	Posthumous inductee: Won AWA World Women's Championship (1 time), Texas Women's Championship (1 time), Central States Women's Championship (1 time).
2010	Gorilla Monsoon (Robert Marella)	Colleague	Posthumous inductee: Won IWA World Heavyweight Championship (1 time), and WWC North American Heavyweight Championship (2 times).
2011	Everett Marshall	Pioneer Era	Posthumous Inductee: Won NWA World Heavyweight Championship (2 Times), MWA Heavyweight Championship (1 Time), Texas Heavyweight Championship (1 Time)
2011	Bronko Nagurski (Bronislau Nagurski)	Pioneer Era	Posthumous Inductee: NWA/NBA World Heavyweight Championship (2 Times), NWA Pacific Coast Heavyweight Championship (San Francisco version) (2 Times), Minneapolis World Heavyweight Championship (2 Times)
2011	Dick the Bruiser (William Afflis)	Television Era	Posthumous Inductee: Inducted into the Professional Wrestling Hall of Fame and Museum in 2005 in the Tag Team Category with Crusher. Won WWA World Heavyweight Championship (11 Times)
2011	The Sheik (Ed Farhat)	Television Era	Posthumous Inductee: Won NWA United States Heavyweight Championship (Detroit version) (12 Times), NWA United States Heavyweight Championship (Toronto version) (4 Times)
2011	Ivan Koloff (Oreal Donald Perras)	Modern Era	Won NWA Mid-Atlantic Heavyweight Championship (4 Times), NWA Television Championship (3 Times), NWA Mid-Atlantic Television Championship (2 Times), NWA World Six-Man Tag Team Championship (3 Times), WWWF World Heavyweight Championship
2011	Jerry Lawler	Modern Era	Won NWA/AWA Southern Heavyweight Championship (52 Times), AWA World Heavyweight Championship (1 time), WCWA World Heavyweight Championship (3 times), USWA Unified World Heavyweight Championship (28 Times) – Won 168 titles in his career, more than any other wrestler
2011	Road Warrior Animal (Joseph Michael Laurinaitis)	Tag Team	Was inducted as member of The Road Warriors. Won NWA National Tag Team Championship (4 Times), AWA World Tag Team Championship (1 time), All Japan NWA International Tag Team Championship (1 time), NWA World Six-Man Tag Team Championship (3 times), NWA World Tag Team Championship {Mid-Atlantic} (1 time}. i-Generation Tag Team Championship (3 Times), WWF World Tag Team Championship (3 Times)
2011	Road Warrior Hawk (Michael James Hegstrand)	Tag Team	Posthumous Inductee: Was inducted as member of The Road Warriors. Won NWA National Tag Team Championship (4 Times), AWA World Tag Team Championship (1 time), All Japan NWA International Tag Team Championship (1 time), NWA World Six-Man Tag Team Championship (3 times), NWA World Tag Team Championship {Mid-Atlantic} (1 Time), i-Generation Tag Team Championship (2 Times), WWF World Tag Team Championship (2 Times), New Japan IWGP Tag Team Championship (2 Times)
2011	Paul Ellering	Tag Team	Was inducted as a member of The Road Warriors. Managed The Road Warriors from 1983 until 1997 during their stints at the American Wrestling Association, the National Wrestling Alliance, New Japan Pro-Wrestling, and the World Wrestling Federation.
2011	Billy Robinson	International	Won AWA British Empire Heavyweight Championship (3 Times), CWA World Heavyweight Championship (3 Times), IWA World Heavyweight Championship (2 Times), NWA United National Championship (1 Time), PWF World Heavyweight Championship (1 Time)
2011	Judy Grable	Lady Wrestler	Posthumous Inductee: Honoree at the Cauliflower Alley Club in 2002.
2011	Vincent K. McMahon	Executive	Chairman of the World Wrestling Federation since 1980 & President and CEO of the World Wrestling Federation from 1980 until 1993. In 2009, he took over the position of CEO of the World Wrestling Entertainment again. Won WWF Championship (1 Time), ECW World Heavyweight Championship (1 Time)
2012	Abe Coleman	Pioneer Era	Posthumous Inductee: Honoree at the Cauliflower Alley Club in 1995.
2012	The French Angel (Maurice Tillet)	Pioneer Era	Posthumous Inductee: AWA World Heavyweight Champion (Boston version) (2 Times)
2012	Dominic DeNucci	Television Era	Won AWA United States Heavyweight Championship (1 Time), NWF Heavyweight Championship (1 Time), IWA World Heavyweight Championship (3 Times)
2012	Fritz Von Erich (Jack Barton Adkisson)	Television Era	Posthumous Inductee: Won NWA American Heavyweight Championship (13 Times), AWA World Heavyweight Championship (1 Time), NWA North American Heavyweight Championship (Amarillo version) (4 Times)
2012	Junkyard Dog (Sylvester Ritter)	Modern Era	Posthumous Inductee: Won USWA Unified World Heavyweight Championship (1 Time), Stampede North American Heavyweight Championship (2 Times), Mid-South Louisiana Championship (3 Times), Mid-South North American Championship (4 Times)
2012	Jimmy Snuka	Modern Era	Won NWA ECW World Heavyweight Championship (2 Times), NWA Pacific Northwest Heavyweight Championship (5 Times), NWA United States Heavyweight Championship (Mid-Atlantic version) (1 Time), WWWA Heavyweight Championship (1 Time)
2012	Afa	Tag Team	Inducted as a member of The Wild Samoans. Won WWF Tag Team Championship (3 Times), Stampede International Tag Team Championship (2 Times), Mid-South Tag Team Championship (3 Times), NWA Florida Tag Team Championship (1 Time)
2012	Sika	Tag Team	Inducted as a member of The Wild Samoans. Won WWF Tag Team Championship (3 Times), Stampede International Tag Team Championship (2 Times), Mid-South Tag Team Championship (3 Times), NWA Florida Tag Team Championship (1 Time)
2012	George Gordienko	International	Posthumous Inductee: Won British Commonwealth Heavyweight Championship (1 Time), NWA Pacific Coast Heavyweight Championship (Vancouver version) (1 Time), British Commonwealth Heavyweight Championship (New Zealand version) (1 Time), NWA Canadian Heavyweight Championship (Calgary version) (1 Time)
2012	Wendi Richter	Lady Wrestler	Won WWF Women's Championship (2 Times), WWC Women's Championship (2 Times), AWA Women's Championship (1 Time)
2012	Jim Cornette	Colleague	Successful manager, promoter, booker, and announcer for such promotions as the Jim Crockett Promotions, World Championship Wrestling, World Wrestling Federation, Total Nonstop Action Wrestling, and Ring of Honor Wrestling, as well as owning Smokey Mountain Wrestling from 1991 to 1995.
2013	Dick Shikat	Pioneer Era	Posthumous Inductee: Won World Heavyweight Championship (original version) (1 time), NWA World Heavyweight Championship (2 times)
2013	Sándor Szabó	Pioneer Era	Posthumous Inductee: Won NWA World Heavyweight Championship (1 time), Montreal Athletic Commission World Heavyweight Title (1 time), NWA "Beat the Champ" Television Championship (7 times)
2013	Baron von Raschke (James Donald Raschke)	Television Era	Won WWA World Heavyweight Championship (3 times), NWA American Heavyweight Championship (1 time), NWA Brass Knuckles Championship (Texas version) (1 time), NWA Georgia Heavyweight Championship (1 time), NWA Florida Television Championship (1 time), IWA International Heavyweight Championship (1 time)
2013	Bill Watts	Television Era	Won NWA North American Heavyweight Championship (Tri-State version) (7 times), Mid-South North American Heavyweight Championship (1 time), NWA Tri-State Brass Knuckles Championship (2 times), NWA Texas Heavyweight Championship (1 time)
2013	Dick Murdoch	Modern Era	Posthumous Inductee: Won NWA United National Championship (1 time), NWA Central States Heavyweight Championship (2 times), NWA Southern Heavyweight Championship (Florida version) (1 time), WWC Universal Heavyweight Championship (1 time), NWA Missouri Heavyweight Championship (3 times), Mid-South North American Championship (2 times), NWA North American Heavyweight Championship (Tri-State version) (3 times), NWA Brass Knuckles Championship (Amarillo version) (3 times), NWA International Heavyweight Championship (Amarillo version) (3 times)
2013	Tito Santana (Merced Solis)	Modern Era	Won ECW World Heavyweight Championship (1 time), AWF Heavyweight Championship (2 times), IWCCW Heavyweight Championship (1 time), WWF Intercontinental Heavyweight Championship (2 times), WWF Tag Team Championship (2 times), UCW Heavyweight Championship (1 time), USA Pro Heavyweight Championship (1 time), RWA Heavyweight Championship (1 time)
2013	Assassin #1	Tag Team	Inducted as a member of The Assassins. Won NWA Georgia Tag Team Championship (12 times), NWA United States Tag Team Championship (Florida version) (2 times), NWA Macon Tag Team Championship (2 times), NWA Canadian Tag Team Championship (Vancouver version) (2 times), NWA Southeastern Tag Team Championship (Georgia version) (4 times)
2013	"Assassin #2" Tom Renesto	Tag Team	Posthumous Inductee: Inducted as a member of The Assassins. Won NWA Georgia Tag Team Championship (12 times), NWA United States Tag Team Championship (Florida version) (2 times), NWA Macon Tag Team Championship (2 times), NWA Canadian Tag Team Championship (Vancouver version) (2 times), NWA Southeastern Tag Team Championship (Georgia version) (4 times)
2013	El Santo (Rodolfo Guzmán Huerta)	International	Posthumous Inductee: Won Mexican National Middleweight Championship (4 times), Mexican National Light Heavyweight Championship (1 time), Mexican National Welterweight Championship (2 times), NWA World Middleweight Championship (1 time), NWA World Welterweight Championship (2 times), Winner (and Undefeated) of 35 Luchas de Apuestas matches.
2013	Joyce Grable	Lady Wrestler	Won NWA Texas Women's Championship (1 time), NWA United States Women's Championship (1 time), NWA Women's World Tag Team Championship (4 times), Recipient of the 2010 Cauliflower Alley Club Women's Wrestling Award
2013	J. J. Dillon	Colleague	Legendary Manager of The Four Horsemen, Abdullah the Butcher, Waldo Von Erich, and Ox Baker. PWI Manager of the Year Recipient in 1982, 1983, and 1988.
2014	Stu Hart	Pioneer Era	Posthumous Inductee: Patriarch of the Hart Family. Trained a vast amount of wrestlers, including Roddy Piper, Jake Roberts, Abdullah the Butcher, Dynamite Kid, "Superstar" Billy Graham, Junkyard Dog, The Honky Tonk Man, Jushin Thunder Liger, Chris Jericho, Fritz Von Erich, & Gorilla Monsoon, among others.
2014	Leroy McGuirk	Pioneer Era	Posthumous Inductee: Won NWA World Light Heavyweight Championship (3 Times), NWA World Junior Heavyweight Championship (1 Time), NWA World Junior Heavyweight Championship (1 Time)
2014	Bruiser Brody (Frank Donald Goodish)	Television Era	Posthumous Inductee: Won NWA International Heavyweight Championship (3 Times), NWA American Heavyweight Championship (4 Times), NWA Central States Heavyweight Championship (1 Time), NWA Florida Heavyweight Championship (1 Time), WWA World Heavyweight Championship (1 Time), NWA Brass Knuckles Championship (Texas version) (6 Times)
2014	Mr. Wrestling II (John Francis Walker)	Television Era	NWA Georgia Heavyweight Championship (10 Times), NWA Florida Heavyweight Championship (2 Times), Mid-South North American Championship (1 Time), NWA Alabama Heavyweight Championship (1 Time)
2014	Don Muraco	Modern Era	ECW Heavyweight Championship (2 Times), WWF Intercontinental Championship (2 Times), Stampede North American Heavyweight Championship (1 Time), NWA Americas Heavyweight Championship (1 Time), NWA Florida Heavyweight Championship (1 Time)
2014	The Masked Superstar (William Reid Eadie)	Modern Era	NWA Georgia Heavyweight Championship (4 Times), NWA National Heavyweight Championship (3 Times), NWA American Heavyweight Championship (1 Time), NWA Southern Heavyweight Championship (Florida version) (1 Time), IW North American Heavyweight Championship (1 Time)
2014	Don Fargo	Tag Team	Inducted as a member of The Fabulous Fargo Brothers. Won NWA World Tag Team Championship (Mid-America version) (9 Times), NWA Southern Tag Team Championship (Mid-America version) (2 Times), NWA World Tag Team Championship (Chicago version) (1 Time), NWA World Tag Team Championship (Georgia version) (1 Time)
2014	Jackie Fargo	Tag Team	Posthumous Inductee: Inducted as a member of The Fabulous Fargo Brothers. Won NWA World Tag Team Championship (Mid-America version) (9 Times), NWA Southern Tag Team Championship (Mid-America version) (2 Times), NWA World Tag Team Championship (Chicago version) (1 Time), NWA World Tag Team Championship (Georgia version) (1 Time)
2014	Lord Alfred Hayes	International	Posthumous Inductee: Won World Mid-Heavyweight Championship (1 Time), NWA Western States Heavyweight Championship (2 Times)
2014	Sherri Martel (Sherry Lynn Russell)	Lady Wrestler	Posthumous Inductee: Won WWF Women's Championship (1 Time), AWA World Women's Championship (3 Times), AWA Japan Women's Championship (1 Time)
2014	Gary Hart	Colleague	Posthumous Inductee: Head booker of World Class Championship Wrestling during its "golden years" in the 1980s. Created the classic feud between The Von Erichs and The Fabulous Freebirds as well as introducing memorable characters such as The Great Kabuki, The Great Muta, and King Kong Bundy.
2015	The Great Gama (Ghulam Mohammad Baksh Butt)	Pioneer Era	Posthumous Inductee: Won the Indian version of the World Heavyweight Championship. Billed as the greatest pehlwani wrestler of his time.
2015	Joe Malcewicz	Pioneer Era	Posthumous Inductee: Famous for his controversial win for the World Heavyweight Wrestling Championship over Joe Stecher in which he was not awarded the title.
2015	Pedro Morales	Television Era	Won WWWF World Championship (1 Time), WWF Intercontinental Heavyweight Championship (2 times), WWF World Tag Team Champion (1 time), WWC North American Heavyweight Championship (2 Times), WWA World Heavyweight Championship (2 Times), NWA North American Heavyweight Championship (Hawaii version) (3 Times)
2015	Whipper Billy Watson	Television Era	Posthumous Inductee: Won NWA British Empire Heavyweight Championship (Toronto version) (9 Times), NWA World Heavyweight Championship (1 Time), NWA World Heavyweight Championship (National Wrestling Association) (1 Time), NWA Canadian Heavyweight Championship (Calgary version) (1 Time)
2015	Curt Hennig	Modern Era	Posthumous Inductee. Won AWA World Heavyweight Championship (1 Time), WWC Universal Heavyweight Championship (1 Time), NWA Pacific Northwest Heavyweight Championship (1 Time), WCW United States Heavyweight Championship (1 Time), WWF Intercontinental Heavyweight Championship (2 Times)
2015	Rick Martel (Richard Vigneault)	Modern Era	Won AWA World Heavyweight Championship (1 Time), NWA North American Heavyweight Championship (Hawaii version) (1 Time), NWA Pacific Northwest Heavyweight Championship (1 Time), WCW World Television Championship (1 Time), WWF Tag Team Championship (3 Times)
2015	Terry Gordy	Tag Team	Posthumous Inductee: Inducted as a member of The Fabulous Freebirds. Won NWA World Six-Man Tag Team Championship (Texas version) (5 Times), WCWA World Six-Man Tag Team Championship (1 Time), Triple Crown Heavyweight Championship (2 times), AJPW World Tag Team Championship (7 times), NWA National Tag Team Championship (4 times), Universal Wrestling Federation Championship (1 time), Mid-South Tag Team Championship (2 times), WCW World Tag Team Championship (1 time), NWA World Tag Team Championship (1 time), NWA American Heavyweight Championship (1 time), NWA American Tag Team Championship (1 time).
2015	Michael Hayes (Michael Seitz)	Tag Team	Inducted as a member of The Fabulous Freebirds. Won NWA World Six-Man Tag Team Championship (Texas version) (5 Times), WCWA World Six-Man Tag Team Championship (1 Time), NWA National Tag Team Championship (4 times), NWA United National Championship (1 time), Mid-South Tag Team Championship (1 time), NWA (Mid-Atlantic)/WCW World Tag Team Championship (2 times), WCW United States Heavyweight Championship (1 time), WCW United States Tag Team Championship (2 times), WCW World Six-Man Tag Team Championship (1 time), NWA American Tag Team Championship (1 time).
2015	Buddy Roberts (Dale Hey)	Tag Team	Posthumous Inductee: Inducted as a member of The Fabulous Freebirds. Won NWA World Six-Man Tag Team Championship (Texas version) (5 Times), WCWA World Six-Man Tag Team Championship (1 Time), Mid-South Tag Team Championship (1 time), UWF World Television Championship (1 time)
2015	Jumbo Tsuruta (Tomomi Tsuruta)	International	Posthumous Inductee: First ever Triple Crown Heavyweight Champion having won and unified the PWF Heavyweight Championship, the NWA United National Championship, and the NWA International Heavyweight Championship. One half of the first-ever World Tag Team Champions
2015	Vivian Vachon	Lady Wrestler	Posthumous Inductee: Won AWA World Women's Championship (1 Time)
2015	Jim Crockett Sr.	Executive	Posthumous Inductee: Founder of Jim Crockett Promotions
2016	Earl McCready	Pioneer Era	Posthumous Inductee: Won NWA British Empire/Commonwealth Championship (New Zealand version) (2 Times), NWA British Empire Heavyweight Championship (Toronto version) (3 Times)
2016	Joe Pazandak	Pioneer Era	Posthumous Inductee: Nine month "Beat the Champ" Open Challenge winning streak
2016	Hans Schmidt	Television Era	Posthumous Inductee: Won International Heavyweight Championship (Montreal version) (2 Times), NWA World Television Title Championship (Florida Version) (1 Time), NWA United States Heavyweight Championship (Chicago version) (1 Time)
2016	Greg Valentine (Jonathan Anthony Wisniski)	Television Era	Won NWA Mid-Atlantic Heavyweight Championship (2 Times), IWCCW Heavyweight Championship (1 Time), NWA Canadian Heavyweight Championship (Toronto version) (1 Time), NWA North American Heavyweight Championship (1 Time), WWC Universal Heavyweight Championship (1 Time), NWA Mid-Atlantic Television Championship (2 Times), NWA Television Championship (2 Times), NWA United States Heavyweight Championship (3 Times), WWF Intercontinental Championship (1 Time), WWF Tag Team Championship (1 Time)
2016	Stone Cold Steve Austin (Steven James Anderson)	Modern Era	WWF World Heavyweight Championship (6 Times), WCW United States Heavyweight Championship (2 Times), WWF Intercontinental Championship (2 Times), WWF Tag Team Championship (4 Times), WCW World Television Championship (2 Times), Royal Rumble winner (1997, 1998, 2001), King of the Ring winner (1996)
2016	Sgt. Slaughter (Robert Rudolph Remus)	Modern Era	Won WWF Championship (1 Time), NWA Central States Heavyweight Championship (3 Times), NWA United States Heavyweight Championship (2 Times), NWA Canadian Heavyweight Championship (Toronto version) (1 Time), AWA America's Championship (1 Time), AWA British Empire Heavyweight Championship (1 Time)
2016	Blackjack Mulligan (Robert Deroy Windham)	Tag Team	Inducted as a member of The Blackjacks. Won: WWWF World Tag Team Championship (1 Time), WWA World Tag Team Championship (1 Time), NWA American Tag Team Championship (1 Time), NWA Texas Tag Team Championship (1 Time)
2016	Blackjack Lanza	Tag Team	Inducted as a member of The Blackjacks. Won: WWWF World Tag Team Championship (1 Time), WWA World Tag Team Championship (1 Time), NWA American Tag Team Championship (1 Time), NWA Texas Tag Team Championship (1 Time)
2016	Peter Maivia	International	Posthumous Inductee: Won NWA Australasian Heavyweight Championship (2 times), NWA New Zealand Heavyweight Championship (1 time), NWA Texas Heavyweight Championship (1 Time), NWA Americas Heavyweight Championship (1 Time), NWA Hawaii Heavyweight Championship (1 Time), NWA New Zealand British Empire Commonwealth Heavyweight Championship (2 times), NWA United States Heavyweight Championship (San Francisco version) (2 Times)
2016	Leilani Kai	Lady Wrestler	Won NWA World Women's Championship (1 Time), All Pacific Championship (1 Time), NWA Mid-Atlantic Women's Championship (3 times), WWF Women's Championship (1 Time)
2016	Gene Okerlund	Colleague	Interviewer and Announcer for American Wrestling Association (AWA), World Wrestling Federation (WWF), and World Championship Wrestling (WCW) for nearly thirty years.
2017	Yvon Robert	Pioneer Era	Posthumous Inductee: Won the Boston version of the AWA World Heavyweight Championship (2 Times), NWA World Heavyweight Championship (1 Time), International Heavyweight Championship (Montreal version) (16 Times).
2017	Dick Raines	Pioneer Era	Posthumous Inductee: Won NWA Hawaii Heavyweight Championship (1 Time).
2017	Luther Lindsay	Television Era	Posthumous Inductee: Won NWA Hawaii Heavyweight Championship (1 Time), NWA United States Heavyweight Championship (Hawaii version) (1 Time), NWA Pacific Northwest Heavyweight Championship (1 Time), NWA Canadian Heavyweight Championship (Calgary version) (1 Time)
2017	Sputnik Monroe	Television Era	Posthumous Inductee: Won NWA Tennessee Heavyweight Championship (2 Times), NWA World Junior Heavyweight Championship (1 Time), NWA Texas Heavyweight Championship (1 Time), NWA Southern Junior Heavyweight Championship (1 Time), NWA Georgia Heavyweight Championship (2 Times), NWA Gulf Coast Louisiana Championship (1 Time)
2017	Mick Foley	Modern Era	Won: WWF Championship (3 Times), WWF Tag Team Championship (8 times), TNA World Heavyweight Championship (1 Time), WCWA World Light Heavyweight Championship (1 Time), SCW Heavyweight Championship (1 Time)
2017	Shawn Michaels (Michael Shawn Hickenbottom)	Modern Era	Won: WWF Championship (3 Times), WWE World Heavyweight Championship (1 Time), WWF Intercontinental Championship (3 Times), WWF European Championship (1 Time), WWF Tag Team Championship (6 Times), AWA World Tag Team Championship (2 Times)
2017	Larry Hennig	Tag Team	Inducted as part of a tag team with Harley Race. Won: AWA World Tag Team Championship (4 Times), IWA World Tag Team Championship (1 Time)
2017	Harley Race	Tag Team	Inducted as a part of a tag team with Larry Hennig. Previously inducted into the Professional Wrestling Hall of Fame and Museum in 2004 in the Modern Era Category. Won: AWA World Tag Team Championship (3 Times), IWA World Tag Team Championship (1 Time)
2017	Tatsumi Fujinami	International	Won: IWGP Heavyweight Championship (6 Times), NWA World Heavyweight Championship (1 Time), WCWA World Heavyweight Championship (1 Time), NWA Pacific Northwest Heavyweight Championship (1 Time), UWA World Heavyweight Championship (1 Time), CWA Intercontinental Heavyweight Championship (1 Time), WWF International Heavyweight Championship (2 Times), WWF Junior Heavyweight Championship (2 Times)
2017	Sue Green	Lady Wrestler	Won: PGWA Championship (2 Times), NWA World Women's Championship (1 Time), NWA Texas Women's Championship (4 Times)
2017	George Napolitano	Colleague	Photographer specializing in professional wrestling photography. Won: Jim Melby Award (2013) from the George Tragos/Lou Thesz International Wrestling Institute
2018	Fred Beell	Pioneer Era	Posthumous Inductee: Won American Heavyweight Championship (1 Time), World Light Heavyweight Championship (3 Times), Northwest Championship (1 Time)
2018	Ralph "Ruffy" Silverstein	Pioneer Era	Posthumous Inductee: Won WLW Television Championship (2 Times)
2018	Eddie Graham (Edward F. Gossett)	Television Era	Posthumous Inductee: Won NWA Florida Heavyweight Championship (1 Time), NWA Southern Heavyweight Championship (Florida version) (3 Times), NWA Brass Knuckles Championship (Florida version) (2 Times)
2018	Ernie Ladd	Television Era	Posthumous Inductee: Won NWF North American Heavyweight Championship (6 Times), NWA Florida Heavyweight Championship (1 Time), NWA Southern Heavyweight Championship (Florida version) (1 Time), NWA Americas Heavyweight Championship (3 Times), NWF Heavyweight Championship (1 Time), NWA American Heavyweight Championship (1 Time), WWA World Heavyweight Championship (1 Time)
2018	Sting (Steve Borden)	Modern Era	Won WCW World Heavyweight Championship (6 Times), NWA World Heavyweight Championship (2 Times), TNA World Heavyweight Championship (4 Times), WCW International World Heavyweight Championship (2 Times), WWA World Heavyweight Championship (1 Time), TNA World Tag Team Championship (1 time).
2018	Jim Duggan	Modern Era	Won IWA World Heavyweight Championship (1 Time), TASW Heavyweight Championship (1 Time), Mid-South Louisiana Heavyweight Championship (1 Time), Mid-South North American Heavyweight Championship (1 Time), WCW World Television Championship (1 Time), WCW United States Heavyweight Championship (1 Time), Inaugural Royal Rumble winner (1988)
2018	Red Bastien	Tag Team	Posthumous Inductee: Inducted as a member of The Flying Redheads. Was inducted into the Professional Wrestling Hall of Fame and Museum twice in one year; under Executive and Tag Team. Won NWA Texas Tag Team Championship (1 Time)
2018	Billy Red Lyons	Tag Team	Posthumous Inductee: Inducted as a member of The Flying Redheads. Won NWA Texas Tag Team Championship (1 Time)
2018	Pampero Firpo (Juan Kachmanian)	International	Won 1st ever NWA Americas Heavyweight Championship (3 Times), NWA Hawaii Heavyweight Championship (1 Time), NWA Pacific Northwest Heavyweight Championship (1 Time), NWA Texas Heavyweight Championship (1 Time), WWC Puerto Rico Heavyweight Championship (1 Time)
2018	Toni Rose	Lady Wrestler	Won NWA Southern Women's Championship (Georgia version) (1 Time)
2018	Hiro Matsuda	Colleague	Posthumous Inductee: Won NWA Southern Heavyweight Championship (Florida version) (4 Times), NWA World Junior Heavyweight Championship (2 Times). Trained Hulk Hogan, Keiji Mutoh, Paul Orndorff, Scott Hall, Lex Luger, "Cowboy" Bob Orton, and Ron Simmons.
2018	Joe Higuchi	Referee	Posthumous Inductee: Senior referee for All Japan Pro-Wrestling, 1st official Japanese referee of the National Wrestling Alliance, Referee for Japan Pro-Wrestling Alliance.
2018	Red Bastien	Executive	Posthumous Inductee: Was inducted into the Professional Wrestling Hall of Fame and Museum twice in one year; under Executive and Tag Team. Trainer, Promoter, Booker, and Professional Wrestler that discovered Sting and Ultimate Warrior.
2019	Charley Fox	Pioneer Era	Posthumous Inductee: Won Middleweight Championship (Ohio Version) (1 Time), Light Heavyweight Championship (Southeastern Division) (1 Time), Light Heavyweight Championship (Dallas Version) (1 Time).
2019	Baron Michele Leone	Pioneer Era	Posthumous Inductee: Won NWA World Heavyweight Championship (Los Angeles Version) (1 Time), NWA World Junior Heavyweight Championship (1 Time), NWA Pacific Coast Heavyweight Championship (Los Angeles Version) (2 Times).
2019	Abdullah the Butcher (Lawrence Robert Shreve)	Television Era	Won WWC Universal Heavyweight Championship (5 Times), NWA Canadian Heavyweight Championship (Calgary version) (1 Time), NWF Heavyweight Championship (2 Times), BJW Deathmatch Heavyweight Championship (1 Time), NWA United National Championship (1 Time), Stampede North American Heavyweight Championship (6 Times), WWC Puerto Rico Heavyweight Championship (3 Times), WWC North American Heavyweight Championship (2 Times), PWF World Heavyweight Championship (1 Time), WWC Caribbean Heavyweight Championship (2 Times), WCWA Brass Knuckles Championship (1 Time). Innovator of hardcore matches.
2019	Lord James Blears	Television Era	Posthumous Inductee: Won NWA Hawaii Heavyweight Championship (1 Time).
2019	Ron Garvin (Roger Barnes)	Modern Era	Won NWA World Heavyweight Championship (1 Time), AAW Heavyweight Championship (1 Time), ICW Southeastern Heavyweight Championship (2 Times), NWA Mid-Atlantic Heavyweight Championship (1 Time), NWA Southeastern Heavyweight Championship (Northern Division) (5 Times), NWA National Heavyweight Championship (1 Time), AWA International Television Championship (1 Time), NWA Southern Junior Heavyweight Championship (1 Time), NCW Heavyweight Championship (1 Time), TMW Heavyweight Championship (1 Time).
2019	Owen Hart	Modern Era	Posthumous Inductee: Won USWA Unified World Heavyweight Championship (1 Time), IWGP Junior Heavyweight Championship (1 Time), Stampede North American Heavyweight Championship (2 Times), Stampede British Commonwealth Mid-Heavyweight Championship (1 Time), Stampede Wrestling International Tag Team Championship (1 time), WWF Intercontinental Championship (2 Times), WWF European Championship (1 Time), Winner of the King of the Ring (1994)
2019	Dennis Condrey	Tag Team	Inducted as a member of The Midnight Express. Won NWA World Tag Team Championship (1 Time), AWA World Tag Team Championship (1 Time), Mid-South Tag Team Championship (2 Times), IWC Tag Team Championship (1 Time), ASW Tag Team Championship (7 Times), NWA Rocky Top Tag Team Championship (1 Time), NWA Bluegrass Tag Team Championship (1 Time), NWA American Tag Team Championship (1 Time), AWA Southern Tag Team Championship (3 Times), NWA Southeastern Tag Team Championship (10 Times), WCPW Tag Team Championship (1 Time).
2019	Bobby Eaton	Tag Team	Inducted as a member of The Midnight Express. Won NWA World Tag Team Championship (3 Times), Mid-South Tag Team Championship (2 Times), IWC Tag Team Championship (1 Time), ASW Tag Team Championship (7 Times), NWA Rocky Top Tag Team Championship (1 Time), NWA Bluegrass Tag Team Championship (1 Time), NWA American Tag Team Championship (1 Time).
2019	Randy Rose	Tag Team	Inducted as a member of The Midnight Express. Won AWA World Tag Team Championship (1 Time), AWA Southern Tag Team Championship (3 Times), NWA Southeastern Tag Team Championship (10 Times), WCPW Tag Team Championship (1 Time).
2019	Gory Guerrero	International	Posthumous Inductee: Won Mexican National Middleweight Championship (1 Time), Mexican National Welterweight Championship (1 Time), NWA World Light Heavyweight Championship (2 Times), NWA World Welterweight Championship (1 Time), World Middleweight Championship (1 Time), SCW Southwest Junior Heavyweight Championship (1 Time). Patriarch of the Guerrero wrestling family.
2019	Beverly Shade	Lady Wrestler	Won All-Star Wrestling Women's Championship (2 Times).
2019	Ann LaVerne	Lady Wrestler	Posthumous Inductee: Won NWA Florida Women's Championship (1 Time).
2019	Bob Roop	Colleague	Won Mid-South Louisiana Heavyweight Championship (1 Time), NWA Southeastern Heavyweight Championship (Northern Division) (1 Time), NWA Florida Heavyweight Championship (4 Times), NWA United States Heavyweight Championship (San Francisco Version) (1 Time), NWA Brass Knuckles Championship (Florida Version) (1 Time), NWA Florida Television Championship (1 Time), NWA World Television Championship (Georgia Version) (2 Times), ICW Television Championship (2 Times), Mid-South North American Heavyweight Championship (1 Time), NWA Southeastern Television Championship (1 Time), 1967 NCAA Championship, Michigan State Wrestling Championship (1 Time).
2019	Johnny Dugan	Referee	Posthumous Inductee: Referee for NWA, Mid Pacific Promotions, NJPW, and JWA.
2019	Wally Karbo	Executive	Posthumous Inductee: Promoter and Co-Founder of the AWA with Verne Gagne, Commissioner of the Ladies Pro Wrestling Association. He attended the first meeting of the NWA held by Tony Stecher in 1948 and also served as a referee.
2020	George Zaharias	Pioneer Era	Posthumous Inductee
2020	Bobby Managoff	Pioneer Era	Posthumous Inductee: Won NWA World Heavyweight Championship (World Heavyweight Championship (1 Time), Texas Heavyweight Championship (1 Time), NWA Hawaii Heavyweight Championship (1 Time), Montreal Athletic Commission World Heavyweight Championship (5 Times).
2020	Killer Karl Kox	Television Era	Posthumous Inductee: Won NWA Brass Knuckles Championship (Florida version) (3 Times), NWA Central States Heavyweight Championship (1 Time), NWA Florida Heavyweight Championship (1 Time), NWA Brass Knuckles Championship (Texas version) (3 Times), NWA North American Heavyweight Championship (Tri-State version) (1 Time), IWA World Heavyweight Championship (3 Times), NWA Southeastern Heavyweight Championship (Northern Division) (3 Times), NWA Brass Knuckles Championship (Amarillo version) (1 Time), NWA Western States Heavyweight Championship (1 Time).
2020	King Curtis Iaukea	Television Era	Posthumous Inductee: Won IWA World Heavyweight Championship (4 Times), AWA United States Heavyweight Championship (1 Time), NWA Florida Heavyweight Championship (2 Times), NWA Western States Heavyweight Championship (1 Time), NWA Pacific Northwest Heavyweight Championship (1 Time), NWA Hawaii Heavyweight Championship (4 Times), NWA United States Heavyweight Championship (Hawaii version) (6 Times), NWA British Empire/Commonwealth Heavyweight Championship (1 Time), NWA United States Heavyweight Championship (San Francisco version) (1 Time).
2020	Jake Roberts (Aurelian Smith Jr.)	Modern Era	Won SMW Heavyweight Championship (1 Time), Mid-South North American Heavyweight Championship (2 Times), WCCW Television Championship (1 Time), Stampede North American Heavyweight Championship (1 Time), Mid-South Louisiana Heavyweight Championship (1 Time), NWA National Television Championship (1 Time), NWA World Television Championship (Georgia version) (2 Times), AWF Puerto Rico Heavyweight Championship (1 Time), AWN World Heavyweight Championship (1 Time), BBOW Heavyweight Championship (1 Time)
2020	Magnum T. A. (Terry Wayne Allen)	Modern Era	Won NWA United States Heavyweight Championship (2 Times), Mid-South North American Championship (2 Times).
2020	Butch Miller (Robert Miller)	Tag Team	Inducted as a member of The Bushwhackers. Won NWA Mid-Atlantic Tag Team Championship (1 Time), NWA Pacific Northwest Tag Team Championship (3 Times), Stampede International Tag Team Championship (2 Times), SWCW World Tag Team Championship (1 Time), UWF Tag Team Championship (2 Times), CWA International Tag Team Championship (1 Time), NWA United States Tag Team Championship (Florida version) (1 Time), NWA Florida Tag Team Championship (1 Time), WWC North American Tag Team Championship (4 Times), WWC World Tag Team Championship (2 Times), UCW Tag Team Championship (1 time), USWL Tag Team Championship (1 time), WWWA Tag Team Championship (2 times), NWA Canadian Tag Team Championship (Vancouver version) (1 Time).
2020	Luke Williams (Brian Wickens)	Tag Team	Inducted as a member of The Bushwhackers. Won NWA Mid-Atlantic Tag Team Championship (1 Time), NWA Pacific Northwest Tag Team Championship (3 Times), Stampede International Tag Team Championship (2 Times), SWCW World Tag Team Championship (1 Time), UWF Tag Team Championship (2 Times), CWA International Tag Team Championship (1 Time), NWA United States Tag Team Championship (Florida version) (1 Time), NWA Florida Tag Team Championship (1 Time), WWC North American Tag Team Championship (4 Times), WWC World Tag Team Championship (2 Times), UCW Tag Team Championship (1 time), USWL Tag Team Championship (1 time), WWWA Tag Team Championship (2 times), NWA Canadian Tag Team Championship (Vancouver version) (1 Time).
2020	The Great Kabuki (Akihisa Mera)	International	Won Mid-South Louisiana Heavyweight Championship (1 Time), NWA American Heavyweight Championship (1 Time), NWA United National Championship (1 Time), NWA Television Championship (1 Time), NWA "Beat the Champ" Television Championship (1 Time), NWA Mid-America Heavyweight Championship (1 Time), NWA Brass Knuckles Championship (Texas version) (2 Times), WCCW Television Championship (1 Time).
2020	Debbie Combs	Lady Wrestler	Won NWA World Women's Championship (3 Times), USWA Women's Championship (2 Times), AWF Women's Championship (1 Time), IWA Women's Championship (3 times), MCW Women's Championship (1 time), NAASW Women's Championship (1 time), WWA Women's Championship (1 Time), UCW Women's Championship (1 time), AAWF Ladies' Championship (1 time), SSWF Women's Championship (1 time), WWWA Women's Championship (1 time).
2020	Luna Vachon	Lady Wrestler	Posthumous Inductee: Won USWA Women's Championship (1 Time), LMLW World Championship (1 Time), SWF Ladies' Championship (1 time), GLCW Ladies Championship (1 time), WWOW Television Championship (1 time).
2020	Tim Brooks (wrestler)	Colleague	Won: SCW Southwest Heavyweight Championship (2 Times), NAWA Heavyweight Championship (2 times), NWA Texas Heavyweight Championship (1 Time), Stampede North American Heavyweight Championship (1 Time), WCCW Television Championship (1 Time), NWA National Heavyweight Championship (1 Time), Big D Heavyweight Championship (1 time).
2020	Dick Woehrle	Referee	Posthumous Inductee: Top regional official referee for World Wrestling Federation between the 1960s–1980s.
2020	Dory Funk	Executive	Posthumous Inductee: Promoter for Western States Sports, which produced many stars including Harley Race, Gene Kiniski, "The Million Dollar Man" Ted DiBiase, Tito Santana, Bruiser Brody, Tully Blanchard, and his two sons: Terry Funk and Dory Funk Jr.
2021	Man Mountain Dean	Pioneer Era	Posthumous Inductee
2021	Paul Bowser	Pioneer Era	Posthumous Inductee
2021	José Lothario	Television Era	Posthumous Inductee: Won NWA Brass Knuckles Championship (Florida version) (3 Times), NWA Gulf Coast Heavyweight Championship (1 Time), L&G Caribbean Heavyweight Championship (3 Times), NWA Brass Knuckles Championship (Texas version) (5 Times), NWA Texas Heavyweight Championship (7 Times), WCCW Television Championship (2 Times), NWA Louisiana Heavyweight Championship (Tri-State version) (1 Time)
2021	Tiger Conway Sr.	Television Era	Posthumous Inductee: Won NWA Texas Negro Championship (1 Time)
2021	Tony Atlas (Anthony White)	Modern Era	Won: L&G Promotions Caribbean Heavyweight Championship (2 Times), NWA Mid-Atlantic Heavyweight Championship (1 Time), IWCCW Heavyweight Championship (2 Times), AWF North American Heavyweight Championship (1 time), CWA Heavyweight Championship (1 Time), EWA Heavyweight Championship (1 Time), NWA Georgia Heavyweight Championship (1 Time), WCWA Brass Knuckles Championship (1 Time), NWA West Virginia/Ohio Heavyweight Championship (1 time), NEPW Heavyweight Championship (1 time), SCW Southwest Brass Knuckles Championship (1 Time), WWWA Intercontinental Championship (2 times), WCWA Television Championship (1 Time)
2021	Tommy Rich	Modern Era	Won: USWA Heavyweight Championship (4 Times), SMW Heavyweight Championship (1 Time), AWA Southern Heavyweight Championship (2 Times), NWA Southern Heavyweight Championship (Memphis version) (2 Times), NWA Southeast Continental Heavyweight Championship (1 Time), NWA Mid-America Heavyweight Championship (2 Times), CWA International Heavyweight Championship (1 Time), NWA World Heavyweight Championship (1 Time), NWA National Heavyweight Championship (3 Times), NWA Macon Heavyweight Championship (1 time), NWA Georgia Television Championship (1 Time), NWA Georgia Heavyweight Championship (3 Times), Deep South Heavyweight Championship (2 Times)
2021	Robert Gibson (Ruben Gibson)	Tag Team	Inducted as a member of The Rock 'N' Roll Express. Won SMW Tag Team Championship (10 Times), NWA World Tag Team Championship (Mid-Atlantic version) (4 Times), NWA World Tag Team Championship (5 Times), AWA Southern Tag Team Championship (2 Times), Mid-South Tag Team Championship (3 Times), CWA Tag Team Championship (1 Time), CWA World Tag Team Championship (1 Time), MACW Tag Team Championship (3 Times), NWA Wildside Tag Team Championship (1 Time), PWA Tag Team Championship (1 Time), USWA World Tag Team Championship (2 Times)
2021	Ricky Morton	Tag Team	Inducted as a member of The Rock 'N' Roll Express. Won SMW Tag Team Championship (10 Times), NWA World Tag Team Championship (Mid-Atlantic version) (4 Times), NWA World Tag Team Championship (5 Times), AWA Southern Tag Team Championship (2 Times), Mid-South Tag Team Championship (3 Times), CWA Tag Team Championship (1 Time), CWA World Tag Team Championship (1 Time), MACW Tag Team Championship (3 Times), NWA Wildside Tag Team Championship (1 Time), PWA Tag Team Championship (1 Time), USWA World Tag Team Championship (2 Times)
2021	Leo Burke	International	Won: Stampede North American Heavyweight Championship (8 Times), IW North American Heavyweight Championship (6 Times), WWC Caribbean Heavyweight Championship (1 Time), NWA British Commonwealth Heavyweight Championship (1 Time), ESA Maritimes Heavyweight Championship (1 time), NWA Central States Heavyweight Championship (2 Times), WWC Universal Heavyweight Championship (1 Time), ESA Taped Fist Championship (3 times), WWC Television Championship (1 Time), AGPW United States Heavyweight Championship (3 times)
2021	Judy Martin	Lady Wrestler	Won: PWGA Championship (1 time), NWA United States Women's Championship (3 times), All Pacific Championship (1 Time)
2021	Juanita Coffman	Lady Wrestler	Posthumous Inductee
2021	Skandor Akbar (Jimmy Saled Wehba)	Colleague	Posthumous Inductee: Won NWA Tri-State North American Heavyweight Championship (1 Time), NWA Austra-Asian Heavyweight Championship (1 Time)
2021	Ronnie West	Referee	Posthumous Inductee: Top official for Jim Crockett Promotions, Championship Wrestling from Florida, & Mid-South Wrestling. Also served 13 years working with Georgia Championship Wrestling
2021	Don Owen	Executive	Posthumous Inductee: Promoter and Owner of Pacific Northwest Wrestling from 1942–1992 and a founding member of the National Wrestling Alliance. Wrestlers who wrestled or got their start under Owen's management include Gorgeous George, Nick Bockwinkel, Curt Hennig, Maurice "Mad Dog" Vachon, Jimmy "Superfly" Snuka, and Roddy Piper, among others.

== See also ==
- List of professional wrestling conventions
- International Professional Wrestling Hall of Fame
