= Pak Song =

South Korean professional wrestler (1943-1982)

Personal information
- Born: Pak Song Nam; April 11, 1943 Jinju, Keishōnan-dō, Korea, Empire of Japan
- Died: October 24, 1982 (aged 39) Seoul, South Korea

Professional wrestling career
- Ring name(s): Pak Song; Pak Song Nam; Mr. Korea
- Billed height: 6 ft 6 in (1.98 m)
- Billed weight: 268 lb (122 kg)
- Trained by: Kintarō Ōki
- Debut: 1966
- Retired: c. 1980

Pak Song Nam (April 11, 1943 – October 24, 1982) was a Korean professional wrestler who appeared primarily under the name Pak Song. He is notable for his appearances with the National Wrestling Alliance (NWA) and the Championship Wrestling from Florida (CWF) during the 1970s. His feud with Dusty Rhodes in 1974 is credited for making Rhodes one of the most popular "fan favorites" in the NWA's Florida territory.

== Career ==
Song began wrestling in 1966 in Japan after being trained by Kintarō Ōki, known as Kim Il, who later became tag team partners for Japan Wrestling Association. He made his debut to North America in 1970 where he worked in Texas. That same year, Song defeated Terry Funk for the NWA Western States Heavyweight Championship and teamed with Oki to capture the NWA Texas Tag Team Championship from Gorgeous George, Jr. and Rufus R. Jones. Song also fought in St. Louis. On September 16, 1972, Song lost to Harley Race in a tournament final for the NWA Missouri Heavyweight Championship.

In 1972, Song would make his debut for Championship Wrestling from Florida. He was portrayed as a martial artist, dubbed "The Korean Assassin", and broke wood and cement with his bare hands on television. Managed by Gary Hart, Song feuded with Dusty Rhodes, Hiro Matsuda, Jack Brisco and Terry Funk. Song's feud with Dusty Rhodes also worked in Georgia. Song would stay in Florida until 1979. He even was their heavyweight champion.

During his time in Florida, Song worked in various territories in the States and a return to Japan in 1975 for All Japan Pro Wrestling.

On October 10, 1976, Song fought NWF World Heavyweight Champion Antonio Inoki in Seoul, South Korea where Song lost by count out in 18 minutes.

After his time in Florida, Song returned Texas and St. Louis. In 1980, Song made his debut for Central States Wrestling where he teamed with Great Kabuki to win the NWA Central States Tag Team Championship defeating Bob Brown and Dick Murdoch. They dropped the titles to Bob Brown and Pat O'Connor. He would finish his career in the Texas-based Big Time Wrestling promotion. His last documented match was an eight-man elimination match with Stan Stasiak, Gino Hernandez and Gary Young against Bruiser Brody and The Von Erich Family (Fritz, Kevin and David Von Erich) at the Dallas Sportatorium on October 26, 1980.

== Personal life and death ==
Pak Song died on the afternoon of October 24, 1982, at Dangbu Hospital from complications of diabetes at the age of 39. Although some have speculated that Marfan syndrome contributed to his death, his obituary reported complications from diabetes as the cause.

Song was survived by his wife, Lee Hye-ran, a son, and a daughter.

== Championships and accomplishments ==
- Big Time Wrestling
  - NWA Texas Tag Team Championship (2 times) – with Kim Il and Gino Hernandez
- Central States Wrestling
  - NWA Central States Tag Team Championship (1 time) – with Takachiho
- Championship Wrestling from Florida
  - NWA Florida Heavyweight Championship (2 times)
  - NWA Southern Heavyweight Championship (Florida version) (2 times)
  - NWA Florida Tag Team Championship (3 time) – with Eric the Red, Mr. Uganda and Bugsy McGraw
  - NWA United States Tag Team Championship (Florida version) (2 times) – with Jos LeDuc and Killer Khan
  - NWA United States Tag Team Championship Tournament (1979) – with Killer Khan
- Georgia Championship Wrestling
  - NWA Georgia Tag Team Championship (1 time) – with The Executioner
- Korean Wrestling Association
  - Far East Tag Team Championship (1 time) - with Chon Kyu-tok
  - Korea Tag Team Championship (1 time) – with Park Sung-mo
- NWA Hollywood Wrestling
  - NWA Americas Heavyweight Championship (1 time)
  - NWA Americas Tag Team Championship (1 time) – with Mr. Wrestling
- NWA New Mexico
  - NWA Rocky Mountain Heavyweight Championship (1 time)
- NWA Western States Sports
  - NWA Western States Heavyweight Championship (2 times)
  - NWA Brass Knuckles Championship (Amarillo version) (1 time)
  - NWA Western States Tag Team Championship (2 times) – with Kim Il

== See also ==
- List of premature professional wrestling deaths
