= Davey O'Hannon =

American professional wrestler (born 1951)

Personal information
- Born: June 26, 1951 (age 75) Kansas City, Missouri, U.S.

Professional wrestling career
- Ring name(s): Davey O'Hannon; Irish
- Billed height: 6 ft 0 in (1.83 m)
- Billed weight: 257 lb (117 kg)
- Billed from: Boston
- Debut: 1972
- Retired: 1988

Davey O'Hannon (born June 26, 1951) is an American professional wrestler best known for working in the World Wide Wrestling Federation from 1972 to 1982.

== Professional wrestling career ==
O'Hannon started his professional wrestling career in 1972 for the World Wide Wrestling Federation in New York City and the Northeast. He lost to Tony Garea during Garea's WWWF debut at a TV taping in the Philadelphia Arena on September 20, 1972. He was a heel jobber and wore a kelly green jacket when he made his entrance. He fought Dominic DeNucci, George Steele, Ivan Putski, Larry Zbyszko, Pete Sanchez, Gorilla Monsoon, Tito Santana and Rick Martel. Fought against Johnny Rodz at Madison Square Garden in a 20-minute draw. His last match in the WWF was on April 14, 1982 when he defeated Johnny Rodz by count out.

O'Hannon made two tours to Japan in 1976 for All Japan Pro Wrestling and in 1982 for New Japan Pro Wrestling.

In 1985 he worked for the American Wrestling Association.

== Personal life ==
Since retiring from wrestling, O'Hannon resides in the Iselin section of Woodbridge Township, New Jersey, and is a member of the Pro Wrestling Hall of Fame.

O'Hannon appears in 350 Days: Legends, Champions, Survivors, a documentary released in 2018. He mentions an encounter he had with a fan was with a barber’s razor on the way out of the ring.

O'Hannon published a book Bruno Sammartino: The Autobiography of Wrestling's Living Legend, released in 2019 a year after Sammartino's death.

== Championships and accomplishments ==
- NWA Western States
  - NWA Western States Tag Team Champion (1 time) - with Dennis Stamp (1)
- World Class Championship Wrestling
  - NWA Brass Knuckles Championship (Texas version) (1 time)
