= Tiger Conway =

American professional wrestler (1932–2006)

- Tiger Conway posing for a photo

Personal information
- Born: Plasse Dennis Bradford Conway; August 4, 1932 Shreveport, Louisiana, U.S.
- Died: November 13, 2006 (aged 74) Houston, Texas, U.S.
- Spouse: Inita Conway (m. 1950)

Professional wrestling career
- Ring name(s): Tiger Conway; Tiger Conway Sr.
- Billed height: 5 ft 11 in (180 cm)
- Billed weight: 264 lb (120 kg)
- Trained by: Danny McShain
- Debut: 1955
- Retired: 1979

Plasse Dennis Bradford Conway (August 4, 1932 – November 13, 2006) was an American professional wrestler, better known by his ring name, Tiger Conway.

== Professional wrestling career ==
Conway was born on August 4, 1932, in Shreveport, Louisiana. He grew up living on a plantation with his parents and moved to Houston, Texas, in 1947, where he worked in a hotel. At the hotel, he met wrestler Danny McShain, who helped him get involved in wrestling.

In the 1950s, when Conway made his debut, professional wrestling was segregated and people competed against others of their own race. Conway was forced to compete against only other African Americans for much of his career. Conway was forced to wrestle on the "chitterling circuit", named after the innards of pigs that slave owners refused to eat and gave to their slaves instead. Conway won his only title, the Texas Negro Championship, in his first professional match.

By the 1960s, Conway was permitted to compete against Caucasians. In a match against Maurice "Mad Dog" Vachon, Vachon broke Conway's kneecap. Later in his career, Conway formed a tag team with his son, who competed as Tiger Conway Jr.

His career continued into the late 1970s working with the major southern territories the National Wrestling Alliance, Jim Crockett Promotions and the Von Erich's World Class Championship Wrestling. He retired from active competition in 1979 and continued in the industry doing security and other non-wrestling jobs.

== Personal life ==
Conway was a member of the Cauliflower Alley Club, an organization for retired wrestlers and boxers. After his retirement from wrestling, he operated a fence-building business and was a member of the Christian Alliance for Humanitarian Aid, Inc. board of directors.

Conway married Inita Conway, and they remained married until his death 56 years later. In November 2006, Conway suffered a stroke and brain aneurysm. He died on November 13, 2006, in Houston.

== Championships and accomplishments ==
- NWA Southwest Sports
  - NWA Texas Negro Championship (1 time)
- Professional Wrestling Hall of Fame and Museum
  - Class of 2021
