= Cyclone Negro =

Venezuelan professional wrestler (1932–2013)

Ciclón Negro
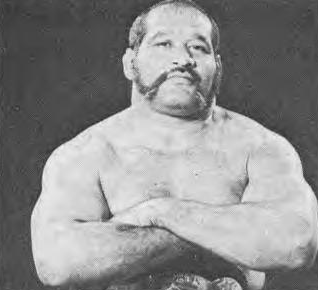

Personal information
- Born: Ramon Eduardo Rodriguez; April 7, 1932 San Felipe, Venezuela
- Died: February 20, 2013 (aged 80) Melbourne, Florida, U.S.

Professional wrestling career
- Ring name(s): Ciclón Negro; Cyclone Negro; Calypso Hurricane; Caripus Hurricane; Caribs Hurricane; Chief Guacanopoulos; Cyclops; Eduardo Rodríguez; Lalo Rodríguez; Reyes Rodríguez; El Patriota; Mr. Uganda; Punchy Pinero; Ciclon Venezuelano
- Billed height: 6 ft 1 in (1.85 m)
- Billed weight: 250 lb (110 kg)
- Debut: 1956
- Retired: 1984

Ramon Eduardo Rodriguez (April 7, 1932 – February 20, 2013), better known by the ring name Ciclón Negro (Black Cyclone), was a professional wrestler who was originally from Venezuela. He toured Australia, Canada, Japan, Puerto Rico and the United States. He achieved a good amount of popularity and recognition during the 1970s.

== Background ==
Rodriguez was born in San Felipe, Venezuela on April 7, 1932. In his early days he was a welder, an occupation he would return to in later years. At the height of his popularity he was recognized as being one of the best wrestlers of the day. He was also something of a showman and broke boards and objects over his head to show how hard it was. He was successful in the 1970s with his matches against Dory Funk Sr. and Terry Funk.

== Professional wrestling career ==
=== 1950s to 1960s ===
Negro had a 28-year career that lasted until his retirement in the 1980s. He was also responsible for helping the careers of two wrestlers, Omar Atlas and Mario Milano, the latter who he helped bring to the United States.

He trained as a boxer in his early days. In 1951, he fought Floyd Patterson in the Pan-American Games. Due to his physique and increase in size, he switched to wrestling, becoming a pro wrestler in 1956. He went under the name of Ciclon Venezolano which in English meant the Venezuelan Cyclone. He had met Omar Atlas in a gym and they became friends. It was Negro who introduced Atlas to wrestling and thus kick started his career. Negro went to Europe in 1958 and over the next six years at various stages, he wrestled in Spain, France, Belgium, England, Germany and Italy. In 1964 and 1968 he showed up in the Japan Pro Wrestling Alliance as Calypso Hurricane.

=== 1970s to 1980s ===
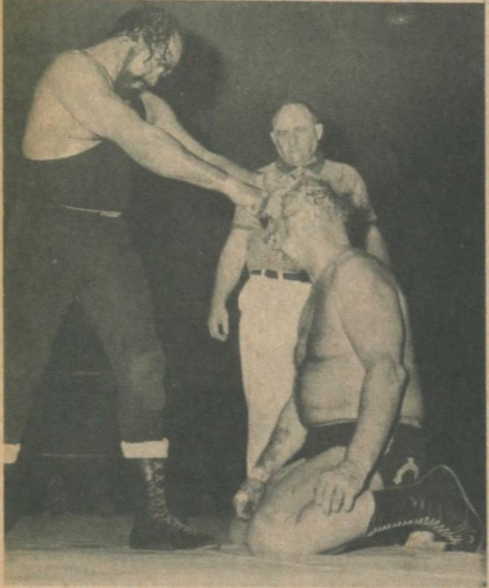
Negro (left) in a 1972 match against Dory Funk

In 1974, Negro defeated Brute Bernard in New York for the World Brass Knuckles Championship. In 1978, he defeated Dusty Rhodes and took the NWA Florida Heavyweight title. In 1982, he defeated El Monarca and took the NWA Americas Heavyweight title. In 1984, he retired from wrestling after a tour with the Japanese UWF.

== Death ==
Rodriguez died February 20, 2013, at age 80.

== Championships and accomplishments ==
- All Japan Pro Wrestling
  - NWA International Tag Team Championship (1 time) – with Killer Karl Kox
- American Wrestling Alliance
  - AWA World Tag Team Championship (1 time) – with The Masked Terror
- Big Time Wrestling (San Francisco)
  - NWA California State Heavyweight Championship (1 time)
  - NWA World Tag Team Championship (San Francisco version) (1 time) – with The Mongolian Stomper
- Capitol Sports Promotions
  - WWC Caribbean Heavyweight Championship (2 times)
  - WWC North American Tag Team Championship (1 time) – with Huracán Castillo
- Championship Wrestling from Florida
  - NWA Florida Heavyweight Championship (2 times)
  - NWA Brass Knuckles Championship (Florida version) (2 times)
  - NWA Fort Myers Heavyweight Championship (1 time)
  - NWA World Tag Team Championship (Florida version) (6 times) – with Jack Brisco (2), Sam Steamboat, Omar Negro (2) and Pak Song
- International Wrestling Alliance
  - IWA World Tag Team Championship (3 times) – with Baron Mikel Scicluna
- Japan Wrestling Association
  - All Asia Tag Team Championship (1 time) – with Gene Kiniski
- Mid-Atlantic Championship Wrestling
  - NWA Brass Knuckles Championship (Mid-Atlantic version) (1 time)
- NWA Hollywood Wrestling
  - NWA Americas Heavyweight Championship (1 time)
  - NWA Brass Knuckles Championship (Los Angeles version) (2 times)
- NWA Southwest Sports
  - NWA Texas Heavyweight Championship (1 time)
  - NWA World Tag Team Championship (3 times) – with Dory Dixon, Oscar Salazar and Ricki Starr
  - NWA Texas Tag Team Championship (4 times) – with Torbellino Blanco (3) and Dory Dixon
- NWA Tri-State
  - NWA United States Tag Team Championship (Tri-State version) (1 time) – Dr. X
- NWA Western States Sports
  - NWA Western States Heavyweight Championship (6 times)
  - NWA Brass Knuckles Championship (Amarillo version) (3 times)
  - NWA International Heavyweight Championship (Amarillo version) (4 times)
  - NWA Rocky Mountain Heavyweight Championship (2 times)
  - NWA Western States Heavyweight Championship (1 time) – with Karl Von Steiger
- World Championship Wrestling
  - NWA Austra-Asian Heavyweight Championship (1 time)
  - World Brass Knuckles Championship (1 time)
