= Dennis Stamp =

American wrestler & referee (1946-2017)

- Dennis Stamp circa early 1970s

Personal information
- Born: December 6, 1946 Brainerd, Minnesota
- Died: March 13, 2017 (aged 70)

Professional wrestling career
- Ring name(s): Dennis Stamp; The Tulsa Tornado
- Billed height: 6 ft 2 in (1.88 m)
- Billed weight: 250 lb (110 kg)
- Trained by: Verne Gagne
- Debut: 1971
- Retired: 1991

Dennis Stamp (December 6, 1946 – March 13, 2017) was an American professional wrestler and referee. He was best known for wrestling extensively during the 1970s and 1980s for the American Wrestling Association, and for the National Wrestling Alliance territories.

== Professional wrestling career ==
=== Early career ===
Stamp, who grew up in Brainerd, Minnesota, won the 1965 Minnesota State High School Wrestling Championship for the 175 pound weight class. After entering professional wrestling and having his first match on August 9, 1971, in Thunder Bay Ontario, he would join Verne Gagne's AWA where he became their 1971 Rookie of the Year. Shortly thereafter, he joined Leroy McGuirk's Tri-State territory, and in 1973 he and Bull Bullinski won the NWA Tri-State Tag Team Championship. After losing the titles seven days later, he would regain the titles (with a new partner, Dewey Robertson) in May of that year.

In 1974, Stamp had moved to the NWA's Los Angeles territory, where he was a two-time Television Champion, first defeating Man Mountain Mike and then Greg Valentine. By the fall of 1975, he had joined Vancouver's All Star Wrestling, and with Tiger Jeet Singh won the Canadian Tag Team Championship.

By 1976, he had joined the NWA's Western States promotion operated by Dory Funk and his sons Dory Jr. and Terry. There, wrestling primarily as a heel, he would become a two-time Western States Tag Team Champion, and four-time Brass Knuckles champion.

Stamp appeared with several other professional wrestlers, including Ted DiBiase, Bob Roop, Dick Murdoch, Gene Kiniski, and Tonga Fifita, in the 1978 Sylvester Stallone movie Paradise Alley.

=== Late career ===
Beginning in the 1980s, Stamp began hiring out as an enhancement talent, for which work he would later receive praise from fellow wrestler Manny Fernandez. He also appeared occasionally in the WWF in the mid-1980s, including a December 1986 match shown on the TV program WWF Wrestling Challenge where he teamed with fellow jobber Mike Luca against the Fabulous Rougeau Brothers. He later returned to the AWA, which was in decline at the time due to heavy competition from the WWF and World Championship Wrestling. He was used primarily by the AWA to put over major stars and veterans, like Superfly Jimmy Snuka, Colonel DeBeers, Jerry Lawler, and The Midnight Rockers. Throughout his career, Stamp wrestled about 2,000 matches.

=== Life after wrestling ===
When his wrestling career declined, he began working at a pest control company, where he remained for over 30 years. In 2011, he was diagnosed with Stage 4 non-Hodgkin lymphoma, which he beat.

In 2014, Stamp published a book about his wrestling days titled The Stamp Collection: A Collection of Short Stories from the World's Most Famous Unknown Wrestler. That year he also refereed a main event in Scotland between Ian Ambrose and Martyn Stallyon.

In 2016, Stamp announced that his cancer had returned. He died of lymphoma on March 13, 2017, after which wrestlers including Ted DiBiase and Tommy Dreamer paid tribute to him on social media.

In November 2017, Stamp was posthumously inducted into the Amarillo Pioneer Hall of Fame by the local Amarillo Pioneer newspaper.

=== Beyond the Mat ===
Stamp attained a measure of cult popularity after appearing in the 1999 documentary Beyond the Mat. The film's footage of him was from 1997, when he was the referee for one of Terry Funk's many "retirement" matches (this one against Bret Hart at Terry Funk's WrestleFest). In the film, Stamp said that he did not wrestle as much anymore because he had not been booked for matches, but had kept in shape in case he received a call. His training ritual involved holding arm weights and jumping up and down on a trampoline in his backyard in his underwear. His repeated use of the phrases "I'm not booked!" while discussing his referee job with Funk, and "I don’t do tricks. I just jump." while working out, resulted in popular memes.

== Championships and accomplishments ==
- American Wrestling Association
  - 1971 AWA Rookie of the Year
- NWA Tri-State territory
  - NWA Tri-State Tag Team Championship (2 times) - with Bull Bullinski (1) and Dewey Robertson (1)
- Worldwide Wrestling Associates
  - NWA "Beat the Champ" Television Championship (2 times)
- NWA All-Star Wrestling
  - NWA Canadian Tag Team Championship (1 time) - with Tiger Jeet Singh
- NWA Western States
  - NWA Western States Tag Team Champion (2 times) - with Davey O'Hannon (1) and Al Perez (1)
  - NWA Brass Knuckles Champion (4 times)
