= Dick Woehrle =

American professional wrestling referee and promoter (1930–2012)

Personal information
- Born: April 1, 1930 Scranton, Pennsylvania, U.S.
- Died: March 12, 2012 (aged 81) Deptford Township, New Jersey, U.S.
- Spouse: Judi Roth
- Children: 2

Professional wrestling career

Richard Woehrle (April 1, 1930 – March 12, 2012) was an American professional wrestling referee and promoter, working mainly for American Wrestling Association and World Wide Wrestling Federation.

Woehrle was a boxer growing up, and he later trained boxers and referees.

Woehrle died from colon cancer on March 12, 2012, at the age of 81.

== Accolades ==
- Professional Wrestling Hall of Fame and Museum
  - (Class of 2020)
