= Hercules Cortez =

Spanish professional wrestler (1932–1971)

Hercules Cortes

Personal information
- Born: Alfonso Carlos Chicharro y Lamamié de Clairac; July 7, 1932 Spain
- Died: July 24, 1971 (aged 39) near St. Cloud, Minnesota, U.S.

Professional wrestling career
- Ring name(s): Hercules Cortes; Hercules Cortez; Pepe Chicharo; Pepe Cortez; Claude Dassaray
- Billed height: 6 ft 3 in (1.91 m)
- Billed weight: 320 lb (145 kg)
- Billed from: Madrid, Spain
- Debut: 1952

Alfonso Carlos Chicharro y Lamamié de Clairac (July 7, 1932 – July 24, 1971) was a Spanish professional wrestler and actor, better known by his ring name Hercules Cortez. He competed in Spanish and other European and North American wrestling promotions including the American Wrestling Association and International Wrestling Alliance and at the time of his death was an incumbent co-holder of the AWA World Tag Team Championship.

== Professional wrestling career ==
Alfonso Carlos Chicharro began his professional career in the 1950s as Pepe Chicharro/Pepe Cortés in Spain. In 1958, he competed in Canada and the United States using the name Claude Dassary. By 1960, Alfonso had finally settled on the name "Hercules Cortez", as suggested by his wife, Valeri.

A trademark of Hercules Cortez was a giant boulder he brought from Spain which he would place in the ring and dare others to lift. He traveled all over the world wrestling in many different venues and territories. He also acted in several films in his native Spain and in some Italian movies.

== Personal life ==
Cortez (Alfonso Carlos Chicharro) was born the youngest of 13 children from a prominent family in Spain. His family suffered much tragedy due to the Spanish civil war including loss of several of his young siblings (all in their teens). As his family survived the war, he was able to attend college as a young man at 'El Escorial' where he studied to be an engineer. Although he was doing well, and his family was pleased, he kept his love of the outdoors and physical challenges as he grew up tall and strong. Soon, he gained attention for his natural strength, he was offered an opportunity to wrestle and earn some money. He decided to try it and found he enjoyed it, so he ventured out into the world of wrestling. During his travels, while in Canada, he met his future wife and mother of his three children. She was a beautiful young German woman named Waltraud (later changed to Valerie) who did not speak Spanish at that time. Cortez who was well educated and spoke several languages, was able to speak to her in her native tongue and soon they fell in love, got married and had three children together. Oldest to youngest; Alfonso (1960), Ricardo (1963) and Maria Dolores (1964).

His wife accompanied him in his travels to many places even bringing along his oldest son until his family grew. They lived in the United States, then Spain, and finally settling back to the United States. It was just months after buying a home in the United States (Ohio), that yet another tragedy struck his family as he was killed in a car accident at the young age of 39 years. His wife (31 years old) was left a widow with three young children ages (11 yrs, 8 yrs, and 6 yrs old). His family has remained here in the US to this day.

== Death ==
By 1971, Cortez was wrestling in America and held the AWA World Tag Team Championship with Red Bastien.

On July 24, 1971, Hercules Cortez died of injuries suffered in a single-car accident early in the morning. Cortez and Bastien were returning to Minneapolis-St. Paul after a tag team match in Winnipeg just hours earlier.

Eye witnesses state that Hercules was driving well over 100 miles per hour down a highway near St. Cloud, Minnesota.

The next time they saw the vehicle, it had crashed on the side of the highway. Bastien survived the wreck with some minor injuries. Hercules Cortez on the other hand was ejected from the vehicle and landed approximately 75 feet away from the wreckage. It was believed that Cortez suffered a broken neck and died instantly.

First reports had it that Bastien, long a popular mat performer in the area had been seriously injured, but fortunately, it turned out this was not so.

Bastien told AWA promoter Wally Karbo that he really didn't know what happened or what caused the accident. "All I know." said Bastien, "was that Hercules was at the wheel. The next thing I knew the car went off the road, turned over and then righted itself. I found myself under the dashboard, hardly believing I was still alive."

Hercules, had been scheduled to wrestle Nick Bockwinkel later that day. He was buried in North Royalton, Ohio.

Hercules was still one-half of the AWA World Tag Team Champions with Red Bastien at the time of his death. Bastien chose The Crusher (wrestler) to replace Hercules as his new partner.

== Championships and accomplishments ==
- American Wrestling Association
  - AWA World Tag Team Championship (1 time) - with Red Bastien
- Cauliflower Alley Club
  - Posthumous Award (2002)
- International Wrestling Alliance
  - IWA World Heavyweight Championship (1 time)
- Corporacion Internacional de Catch
  - Spanish Heavyweight Championship (1 time)
- World Championship Wrestling (Australia)
  - IWA World Heavyweight Championship (1 time)

== See also ==
- List of premature professional wrestling deaths
