= NWA Austra-Asian Heavyweight Championship =

Professional wrestling championship

Details
- Promotion: World Championship Wrestling
- Date established: 1972
- Date retired: December 1978
Statistics
- First champion(s): Spiros Arion
- Most reigns: Spiros Arion (3)

The NWA Austra-Asian Heavyweight Championship was the top singles professional wrestling title in the Australian World Championship Wrestling promotion from 1972 until the promotion's 1978 closure.

WCW had joined the National Wrestling Alliance in August 1969, still recognizing its IWA World Heavyweight Championship title as its world title. In 1971, that title was abandoned in favor of this one. The NWA World Heavyweight Championship was then recognized in WCW as the world title.

11 different men held the championship, combining for 15 individual title reigns.

== Title history ==
Key
Symbol	Meaning
No.	The overall championship reign
Reign	The reign number for the specific wrestler listed.
Event	The event in which the championship changed hands
N/A	The specific information is not known
—	Used for vacated reigns in order to not count it as an official reign

No.	Champion	Reign	Date	Days held	Location	Event	Notes	Ref(s).
1	Spiros Arion	1	28 April 1972	133	Sydney, New South Wales	Live event	Defeated Killer Karl Kox to become the first champion	
2	Bulldog Brower	1	8 September 1972	14	Sydney, New South Wales	Live event		
3	Spiros Arion	2	22 September 1972	43	Sydney, New South Wales	Live event		
4	Brute Bernard	1	4 November 1972	21	Melbourne, Victoria	Live event		
5	Spiros Arion	3	25 November 1972	(Note: The exact date the championship was lost is uncertain, which means that the reign lasted between 736 and 766 days.)	Sydney, New South Wales	Live event		
6	Waldo Von Erich	1	December 1974	(Note: The exact date the championship was won is uncertain, which means that the reign lasted between −226 and −196 days.)	Fiji	Live event	It is possible that this was a fictitious title change.	
7	Mario Milano	1	19 May 1974	31	Sydney, New South Wales	Live event		
8	Ciclón Negro	1	19 June 1974	135	Sydney, New South Wales	Live event	Brute Bernard and Ciclón Negro defeated George Gouliovas and Mario Milano in a tag team match with the title at stake, when Negro pinned Milano.	
9	George Gouliovas	1	1 November 1974	119	Sydney, New South Wales	Live event	George Gouliovas and Mario Milano defeated Ciclón Negro and Lorenzo Parente in a tag team match with the title at stake, when Gouliovas pinned Negro.	
10	The Great Mephisto	1	28 February 1975	7	Sydney, New South Wales	Live event		
11	George Gouliovas	2	7 March 1975	148	Sydney, New South Wales	Live event		
12	Moose Morowski	1	2 August 1975	41	Melbourne, Victoria	Live event		
13	Skandor Akbar	1	12 September 1975	29	Sydney, New South Wales	Live event		
14	The Great Mephisto	2	11 October 1975	(Note: The exact date the championship was won is uncertain, which means that the reign lasted between 82 and 112 days.)	Melbourne, Victoria	Live event		
15	Ron Miller	1	January 1976	(Note: The exact date the championship was won and abandoned is uncertain, which means that the reign lasted between 1,035 and 1,077 days.)	New Zealand	Live event	It is possible that this was a fictitious title change.	
—	Abandoned	—	December 1978	—	N/A	N/A	World Championship Wrestling closed.	

== See also ==
- Professional wrestling in Australia
- World Championship Wrestling
