= Skandor Akbar =

American professional wrestler and manager (1934–2010)

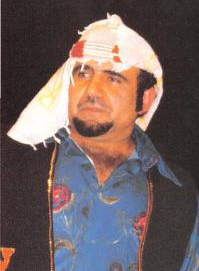
- Akbar, c. 1983

Personal information
- Born: Jimmy Saied Wehba; September 29, 1934 Vernon, Texas, U.S.
- Died: August 19, 2010 (aged 75) Garland, Texas, U.S.

Professional wrestling career
- Ring name(s): Jimmy Wehba; Skandor Akbar; Wildman Wehba
- Billed height: 6 ft 2 in (188 cm)
- Billed weight: 232 lb (105 kg)
- Billed from: Egypt; Lebanon; Saudi Arabia; Syria
- Trained by: Jimmy Young
- Debut: 1963
- Retired: 1996

Jimmy Saied Wehba (September 29, 1934 – August 19, 2010) was an American professional wrestler and professional wrestling manager better known by his ring name Skandor Akbar (which translates as "Alexander the Great"). Akbar led the villainous stable Devastation, Inc. in Bill Watts's Universal Wrestling Federation during the promotion's heyday in the 1980s, as well as other regional territories, including World Class Championship Wrestling and the Global Wrestling Federation.

== Early life ==
Wehba was born on September 29, 1934, in Wichita Falls, Texas, and grew up in Vernon, Texas. His father was from Lebanon, and his mother, Mary, was of Syrian descent, though she too was born in Texas. With two older sisters, Jimmy was the baby of the family. As a preteen, he started weightlifting (at one point, he reportedly bench pressed 500 pounds) as his cousin had a gym. He also worked as a bouncer.

== Professional wrestling career ==
=== Wrestler ===
Wehba started out as a professional wrestler in 1963, under his real name. He adopted the ring name Skandor Akbar (Arabic: اسكندر اكبر), literally meaning Alexander the Great, at the suggestion of Fritz Von Erich in 1966 in order to sound more Arabic. Akbar teamed with Danny Hodge and eventually turned on him, starting a feud. Akbar joined the World Wide Wrestling Federation (WWWF) for a brief run in the late 1970s and was managed by Freddie Blassie. Akbar also worked as a face in the Australian World Championship Wrestling territory for a season in the mid 1970s feuding mainly with The Great Mephisto. He wrestled his last match as a wrestler in 1996.

=== Manager ===
Akbar retired from active wrestling in 1977 and became a villainous manager in the Texas area territory. He called his stables "Akbar's Army" in Mid-South Wrestling for Bill Watts before it became UWF and "Devastation, Inc." in World Class Championship Wrestling for Fritz Von Erich and in 1991 appeared in the World Wrestling Council in Puerto Rico. Akbar smoked cigars at ringside, harassed the fans during his protégés' matches, and occasionally threw fireballs at unsuspecting opponents. In 1994, Akbar briefly managed Kevin Von Erich as a fan favorite in the Global Wrestling Federation. Eventually, though, he turned on Von Erich only weeks before Von Erich decided to retire for good. Akbar also managed Toni Adams for a short time in the GWF. In 2007, he managed Kareem Sadat for All-Ammeircan Championship Wrestling in Oklahoma.

=== Retirement ===
After his semi-retirement, Akbar still made frequent appearances on the independent circuit, while also training wrestlers. He appeared on both the Heroes of World Class and Triumph and Tragedies of World Class retrospective documentaries, released in 2005 and 2007, respectively. From 2008 to 2010, he appeared as a manager in the Dallas-based Wrecking Ball Wrestling promotion. He also operated a countertop business.

== Personal life ==
Often billed from Egypt, Lebanon, Syria or Saudi Arabia, his father actually was from Lebanon, and his mother, Mary, was Syrian, though she too was born in Texas. With two older sisters, he was the youngest of the family.

== Death ==
Wehba died on August 19, 2010, in Texas, reportedly due to complications from a fall or after a long battle with prostate cancer.

== Championships and accomplishments ==
- Cauliflower Alley Club
  - Gulf Coast/CAC Honoree (2006)
- Mid-South Sports
  - NWA Georgia Tag Team Championship (1 time) with Ox Baker
  - NWA Macon Tag Team Championship (2 times) - with Buddy Colt (1 time) and Rocket Monroe (1 time)
- NWA Tri-State
  - NWA Tri-State North American Heavyweight Championship (1 time)
  - NWA United States Tag Team Championship (Tri-State version) (2 times) - with Danny Hodge
- Professional Wrestling Hall of Fame and Museum
  - Class of 2021
- Southern Wrestling Hall of Fame
  - 2011 inductee
- World Championship Wrestling
  - NWA Austra-Asian Heavyweight Championship (1 time)
  - NWA Austra-Asian Tag Team Championship (1 time) - with George Gouliovas
- Wrecking Ball Wrestling
  - Manager of the Year (2009–2010)
