= Stan Stasiak =

Canadian professional wrestler (1937–1997)

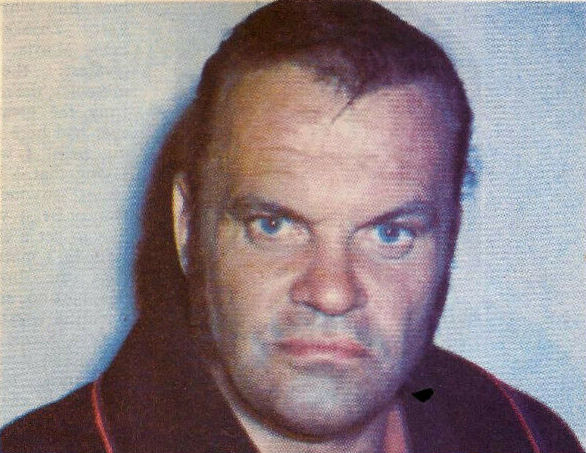
- Stasiak in 1977

Personal information
- Born: George Emile Stipich; April 13, 1937 Arvida, Quebec, Canada
- Died: June 19, 1997 (aged 60) Toronto, Ontario, Canada
- Spouse: Jill Stipitch (m. 1955; died 1984)
- Children: Two, including Shawn Stasiak

Professional wrestling career
- Ring name(s): Crusher Stasiak; Emile Koverly; Stan Stasiak
- Billed height: 6 ft 4 in (193 cm)
- Billed weight: 270 lb (122 kg)
- Billed from: Beaver Creek, Oregon; Buzzard Creek, Oregon
- Debut: 1958
- Retired: 1984

George Emile Stipich (April 13, 1937 – June 19, 1997) was a Canadian professional wrestler, better known by his ring name, Stan "the Man" Stasiak. He is best known for his appearances with the World Wide Wrestling Federation (WWWF) in the 1970s, where he won the WWWF Heavyweight Championship in 1973. He was inducted into the Legacy wing of the WWE Hall of Fame Class of 2018.

== Early life ==
George Stipich was born in the village of Arvida, Quebec. He became a fan of wrestling as a youth, attending shows in Chicoutimi. Stipich and his friends became known for throwing sucker punches at wrestlers; on one occasion, wrestler Don Leo Jonathan blocked Stipich's punch and knocked him unconscious. As a young man, Stipich worked in an aluminium mill while playing ice hockey in the Quebec Amateur Hockey Association but became known for his lack of discipline, with his final coach encouraging him to switch to professional wrestling.

== Professional wrestling career ==
=== Early career (1958–1964) ===
Stipich trained in Montreal, making his debut in 1958. He initially wrestled as "Emile Koverly" for the Calgary, Alberta–based Big Time Wrestling promotion. He also wrestled at Maple Leaf Gardens in Toronto which included a match with Gino Morella, who was later known as Gorilla Monsoon. in October 1960, he wrestled in the United States for the St. Louis Wrestling Club, where he adopted the ring name "Stan Stasiak", taking it from another wrestler named Stanley Stasiak (real name Ignacy Josef Stasiak) who had died in 1931 from sepsis.

By 1961, Stasiak was dividing his time between Canada and the St. Louis Wrestling Club. In June 1961, he won his first championship in the Maple Leaf Wrestling promotion, teaming with Man Mountain Campbell to win the NWA International Tag Team Championship. They held the titles until September 1961. Stasiak continued to wrestle in Canada and the United States throughout the early 1960s, including making a handful of appearances with the Minneapolis, Minnesota–based American Wrestling Association in May 1962. In late 1963, he had a stint with the Amarillo, Texas–based Western States Sports promotion, where he challenged NWA World Heavyweight Champion Lou Thesz.

=== Stampede Wrestling (1964–1968) ===
From 1964 to 1968, Stasiak appeared regularly with the Calgary, Alberta, Canada–based Stampede Wrestling promotion. He held the NWA Canadian Heavyweight Championship on four occasions between 1965 and 1967 and the Stampede Wrestling North American Heavyweight Championship on three occasions in 1968.

=== Pacific Northwest Wrestling (1965–1971) ===
In 1965, Stasiak began appearing regularly with Pacific Northwest Wrestling, where he adopted the fictional "Buzzard Creek, Oregon" as his hometown. He won the promotion's flagship title, the NWA Pacific Northwest Heavyweight Championship, five times in 1965, 1966, 1968, and 1971. He also won the NWA Pacific Northwest Tag Team Championship four times between 1965 and 1969, teaming with Haru Sasaki, the Mad Russian, Mighty Ursus, and Tony Marino.

=== International Wrestling Enterprise (1969) ===
In April and May 1969, Stasiak toured Japan with the International Wrestling Enterprise promotion as part of its "World Selection Series". During the tour, he regularly teamed with Dory Dixon and Tank Morgan in tag team matches and six-man tag team matches. On April 12, 1969, a two-out-of-three-falls match pitting Stasiak and Morgan against Thunder Sugiyama and Toyonobori for the Trans-World Wrestling Alliance World Tag Team Championship ended in a controversial manner, resulting in the titles being vacated; on April 20, Sugiyama and Rusher Kimura defeated Morgan and Stasiak to win the vacant titles. On April 22, Stasiak unsuccessfully challenged Billy Robinson for the IWA World Heavyweight Championship. Stasiak wrestled his final match with IWE on May 5, 1969, teaming with Dixon and Morgan in a loss to Sugiyama, Toyonobori, and the Great Kusatsu.

=== San Francisco (1969–1970) ===
In November 1969, Stasiak began wrestling for the San Francisco, California, United States–based Big Time Wrestling promotion. He quickly formed a tag team with The Gladiator and began feuding with Peter Maivia and Ray Stevens, repeatedly unsuccessfully challenging them for the NWA World Tag Team Championship. In August 1970, he formed a short-lived tag team with Pat Patterson. Stasiak left San Francisco in September 1970.

=== World Championship Wrestling (1970) ===
In October 1970, Stasiak wrestled in Australia for the World Championship Wrestling promotion. In his debut match, he defeated King Curtis Iaukea in the Festival Hall in Melbourne to win the IWA World Heavyweight Championship - his first world heavyweight championship. He lost the title back to Iaukea the following month.

=== World Wide Wrestling Federation (1971–1972) ===
In August 1971, Stasiak debuted in the northeastern United States–based World Wide Wrestling Federation (WWWF). In his debut match, he challenged WWWF Heavyweight Champion Pedro Morales in Madison Square Garden in New York City, New York. Over the following months, he faced opponents such as Gorilla Monsoon, Arnold Skaaland, Víctor Rivera, and Chief Jay Strongbow throughout the northeastern United States. In September 1971, he unsuccessfully challenged Bobo Brazil for the WWWF United States Heavyweight Championship. He went on to unsuccessfully challenge Morales for the WWWF Heavyweight Championship on a number of further occasions. In February 1972, he formed a short-lived alliance with Jimmy Valiant. Valiant left the WWWF later that month.

=== Texas (1972) ===
In March 1972, Stasiak began appearing with the Texas-based Big Time Wrestling and Houston Wrestling promotions, facing opponents such as Bull Curry, Johnny Valentine, and Toru Tanaka. In June 1972, Stasiak defeated Red Bastien to win the NWA Texas Heavyweight Championship at the Big Time Wrestling Parade of Champions event in the Texas Stadium. His reign lasted until October 1972 when he lost to José Lothario in a cage match in the San Antonio Municipal Auditorium. He also briefly held the NWA Brass Knuckles Championship. Stasiak left Texas in December 1972, with his final appearance being a loss to Fritz Von Erich in a Texas death cage match in the Dallas Sportatorium on Boxing Day.

=== All Japan Pro Wrestling (1973) ===
In February 1973, Stasiak appeared in Japan with the recently founded All Japan Pro Wrestling promotion. Wrestling as "Crusher Stasiak", he participated in the "Giant Series Total War" tour. His opponents included Motoshi Okuma, Munenori Higo, and Thunder Sugiyama. During the tour, he occasionally teamed with American wrestler Harley Race. In his final match, he and Race defeated Giant Baba and Samson Kutsuwada in a two-out-of-three-falls match.

=== World Wide Wrestling Federation (1973–1974) ===
Stasiak returned to the WWF in August 1973, adopting the Grand Wizard as his manager. In his first match, he unsuccessfully challenged WWWF Heavyweight Champion Pedro Morales; he went on to challenge Morales in multiple subsequent matches. In November 1973, he faced André the Giant in a series of six-man tag team matches.

On December 1, 1973, in the Philadelphia Arena, Stasiak defeated Morales for the WWWF Heavyweight Championship, ending Morales' nearly three-year long reign. The match ended when Stasiak applied a full nelson to Morales and both wrestlers fell backwards in a position where they both had their shoulders on the mat, only for Stasiak to lift his shoulder as the referee made the count. Following the match, ring announcer Buddy Wagner did not announce Stasiak as the new champion, instead asking the audience to applaud Morales; journalist Dave Meltzer suggested that this was intended to prevent the audience from rioting. Stasiak was given little notice that he would be winning the title. According to him, he was sitting in the dressing room in Philadelphia Arena when a road agent came to discuss the match. Stasiak considered this a formality as he had been having the same discussion, nearly verbatim, in every major city on the Eastern Seaboard for the past two months. However, this time it was different, as the agent told Stasiak that he was to win the championship. According to fellow wrestler Frank Dusek, the WWWF wanted to make Bruno Sammartino champion again, but did not want Sammartino to defeat Morales in the process, so they needed a heel wrestler to win it. Stasiak was used as a transitional champion, holding the WWWF Heavyweight Championship for just nine days before losing it to Sammartino on December 10, 1973, in Madison Square Garden in New York City, New York, United States. Stasiak described his title reign as "the happiest nine days of [my] life". During his brief reign, Stasiak had a single successful title defense, wrestling Chief Jay Strongbow to a no contest on December 7, 1973.

Stasiak faced Sammartino in a rematch in January 1974, but failed to regain the title. In March 1974, Stasiak teamed with Larry Hennig to unsuccessfully challenge Dean Ho and Tony Garea for the WWWF Tag Team Championship. Stasiak continued regularly appearing with the WWWF until October 1974.

=== New Japan Pro-Wrestling (1974) ===
In April and May 1974, Stasiak toured Japan with New Japan Pro-Wrestling, competing in its inaugural World League round-robin tournament. On the first day of the tournament, he wrestled Antonio Inoki to a time limit draw in an exhibition match held in Korakuen Hall in Tokyo. Stasiak scored 5.5 points in the first round of the tournament, but did not progress past the second round. The tournament was ultimately won by Inoki.

=== St. Louis Wrestling Club (1975) ===
In February 1975, Stasiak began wrestling for the St. Louis Wrestling Club, where he regularly appeared on its television show Wrestling at the Chase. His repeat opponents included Pat O'Connor, Édouard Carpentier, and Red Bastien. In October 1975, Stasiak unsuccessfully challenged visiting WWWF Heavyweight Champion Bruno Sammartino. Stasiak left St. Louis in December 1975, with his final match being a loss to Terry Funk in the Kiel Auditorium.

=== Maple Leaf Wrestling (1974–1978) ===
In July 1974 he began to wrestle for Frank Tunney's Ontario promotion, Maple Leaf Wrestling, he fought Tiger Jeet Singh for the Asian title at Maple Leaf Gardens. During the match The Sheik attacked Singh causing Stasiak to lose. From there Stasiak went into a series of matches with The Sheik for the NWA United States Heavyweight Championship. Stasiak's popularity rose as fans discovered that he was indeed a Canadian. Later on he fought Jack Brisco for the NWA World Heavyweight Championship in 1975, Terry Funk for the NWA World Heavyweight Championship in 1976, Superstar Billy Graham WWWF Heavyweight Championship in 1977 and Nick Bockwinkel for the AWA World Heavyweight Championship in 1978.

=== Georgia Championship Wrestling (1976) ===
In January 1976, Stasiak began wrestling for the Atlanta-based Georgia Championship Wrestling promotion. He regularly teamed with other heels such as Abdullah the Butcher, Moondog Mayne, and The Spoiler. In March 1976, Stasiak defeated Dick Slater to win the NWA Macon Heavyweight Championship. He lost the title to Mr. Wrestling II the following month. In September 1976, Stasiak and Killer Brooks unsuccessfully challenged The Black Bombers for the NWA Georgia Tag Team Championship. Stasiak left Georgia Championship Wrestling in October 1976.

=== World Wide Wrestling Federation (1975–1979) ===
On September 13, 1975, Stasiak wrestled Bruno Sammartino who was WWWF Heavyweight Champion to a double disqualification in Steubenville, Ohio.

In November 1976, Stasiak began regularly wrestling for the WWWF once more. In his first match back, he challenged WWWF Heavyweight Champion Bruno Sammartino in Madison Square Garden, winning by count-out. The following month, he lost to Sammartino in a "Sicilian stretcher" match. In early-1977, Stasiak repeatedly challenged Billy White Wolf and Chief Jay Strongbow for the WWWF Tag Team Championship, with his partners including Baron Mikel Scicluna, Baron von Raschke, and Tor Kamata. Throughout spring 1977, Stasiak repeatedly unsuccessfully challenged Sammartino. During the remainder of 1977 and early 1978, Stasiak's regular opponents included Gorilla Monsoon, Ivan Putski, Larry Zbyszko, and Peter Maivia. In April 1978, Stasiak unsuccessfully challenged Bob Backlund, who had recently won the WWWF Heavyweight Championship. Over the following months, he teamed with a series of partners including Butcher Vachon, George Steele, and Johnny Rodz to challenge WWWF Tag Team Champions Dino Bravo and Dominic DeNucci, but was unable to defeat them. Beginning in December 1978, he again teamed with a series of partners to challenge new WWWF Tag Team Champions Larry Zbyszko and Tony Garea. Stasiak left the WWWF in March 1979.

=== New Japan Pro-Wrestling (1979) ===
Stasiak once again toured Japan with New Japan Pro-Wrestling from February to April 1979 as part of its "Big Fight Series". His first match, a loss to Riki Choshu, was broadcast on TV Asahi. During the tour, Stasiak faced opponents such as Antonio Inoki, Riki Choshu, Seiji Sakaguchi, and Tatsumi Fujinami. On several occasions, he teamed with fellow Canadian wrestler Tiger Jeet Singh and with the Japanese wrestler Masa Saito.

=== Late career (1979–1984) ===
In spring 1979, Stasiak returned to Pacific Northwest Wrestling, where he became a mainstay. He won the NWA Pacific Northwest Heavyweight Championship twice more in 1979 and the NWA Pacific Northwest Tag Team Championship four more times. In the early 1980s, he did commentary there and also worked as a photographer. In mid-1980, Stasiak appeared with the Louisiana, United States–based Mid-South Wrestling promotion. In the latter half of 1980, Stasiak competed in Texas once more, appearing with Big Time Wrestling and Western States Sports. During this time, he won the NWA Texas Tag Team Championship and the NWA Brass Knuckles Championship. Stasiak retired from professional wrestling in 1984.

== Retirement ==
After retiring in 1984, Stasiak worked for Kellum Datsun in Gladstone, Oregon, as a car salesman. After a short time at the Datsun dealership, he moved to Toronto, where he worked as a security guard. When his health began to decline, he relocated back to Oregon in 1994. He was inducted into the Stampede Wrestling Hall of Fame in 1995, and (posthumously) into the WWE Hall of Fame in 2018.

== Professional wrestling style and persona ==
For most of his career, Stasiak portrayed a "menacing" heel known for his "rulebreaking tactics". Early in his career he used the nicknames "Crusher" and "the Assassin of Arvida" and a bear hug for a finishing move. Later, he adopted the nickname "The Man" and began using the heart punch - "a stiff shot to his opponent's chest, sold as if it could stop the organ from pumping were Stasiak to land his fist just right" - as his finishing move. He was a "large, powerful, bruising" wrestler. Although hailing from Canada, for most of his career Stasiak was billed from the (fictitious) towns of "Beaver Creek" or "Buzzard Creek" in Oregon in the United States.

== Death ==
Stipich died of congestive heart failure on June 19, 1997, while awaiting a heart transplant. Fellow wrestler Tony Borne gave the eulogy at his funeral, describing him as "a very good natured-individual" and "a real trooper".

== Personal life ==
Stipich had two children: a daughter, Brittany, and a son, Shawn, who also wrestled professionally as Shawn Stasiak. He was survived by his widow Kimberly Stasiak. Stipich was of Croatian descent.

== Championships and accomplishments ==
- Cauliflower Alley Club
  - Other honoree (1996)
- Central States Wrestling
  - NWA Central States Tag Team Championship (1 time) - with Lee Henning
- Georgia Championship Wrestling
  - NWA Macon Heavyweight Championship (1 time)
- Maple Leaf Wrestling
  - NWA International Tag Team Championship (Toronto version) (1 time) - with Man Mountain Campbell
- NWA All-Star Wrestling
  - NWA Canadian Tag Team Championship (Vancouver version) (2 times) - with Dutch Savage
- NWA Big Time Wrestling
  - NWA Brass Knuckles Championship (Texas version) (3 times)
  - NWA Texas Heavyweight Championship (1 time)
  - NWA Texas Tag Team Championship (1 time) - with Killer Tim Brooks
- Upstate Wrestling
  - North American Heavyweight Championship (Upstate Wrestling version) (1 time)
- Pacific Northwest Wrestling
  - NWA Pacific Northwest Heavyweight Championship (6 times)
  - NWA Pacific Northwest Tag Team Championship (8 times) - with Mad Russian (1 time), Mighty Ursus (1 time), Haru Sasaki (1 time), Tony Marino (1 time), Dutch Savage (1 time), Buddy Rose (1 time), and Billy Jack Haynes (2 times)
- Ring Around The Northwest Newsletter
  - Wrestler of the Year (1965)
- Stampede Wrestling
  - NWA Canadian Heavyweight Championship (Calgary version) (4 times)
  - Stampede North American Heavyweight Championship (3 times)
  - Stampede Wrestling Hall of Fame (Class of 1995)
- Western States Sports
  - NWA Brass Knuckles Championship (Amarillo version) (1 time)
- World Championship Wrestling
  - IWA World Heavyweight Championship (1 time)
- World Wide Wrestling Federation / WWE
  - WWWF Heavyweight Championship (1 time)
  - WWE Hall of Fame (Class of 2018)
