= IWA World Heavyweight Championship (Australia) =

Professional wrestling championship

Details
- Promotion: World Championship Wrestling
- Date established: 1964
- Date retired: 1971
Statistics
- First champion(s): Killer Kowalski
- Most reigns: Spiros Arion (6)

The IWA World Heavyweight Championship was a professional wrestling world heavyweight championship in the Australian World Championship Wrestling promotion from its founding in 1964 until 1971.

Although a part of WCW, the championship carried the IWA initials, for the International Wrestling Alliance. The IWA was WCW's sanctioning body for its championships.

WCW joined the National Wrestling Alliance in August 1969, but still recognized this title as its world title. In 1971, the title was abandoned, the NWA Austra-Asian Heavyweight Championship was established as WCW's new top championship, and the NWA World Heavyweight Championship was recognized in WCW as the world title.

24 different men held the championship, combining for 51 individual title reigns.

== Title history ==
Wrestler:	Times:	Date:	Location:	Notes:
Killer Kowalski	1	October 1964	?	Kowalski was awarded the title.
Dominic DeNucci	1	7 November 1964	Melbourne, Victoria	
Ray Stevens	1	January 1965	Sydney, New South Wales	
Dominic DeNucci	2	January 1965	Melbourne, Victoria	
Mitsu Arakawa	1	May 1965	?	This title change occurred no later than this date.
Hercules Cortez	1	June 1965	?	This title change occurred no later than this date.
Killer Kowalski	2	June 1965	?	
Spiros Arion	1	6 August 1965	Sydney, New South Wales	
Karl Krauser	1	1965	Melbourne, Victoria	
Spiros Arion	2	1965	?	
Killer Kowalski	3	December 1965	Honolulu, Hawaii	
Dominic DeNucci	3	12 February 1966	Sydney, New South Wales	
Toru Tanaka	1	3 June 1966	Sydney, New South Wales	
Mark Lewin	1	9 July 1966	Melbourne, Victoria	
Skull Murphy	1	13 August 1966	Melbourne, Victoria	
Bearcat Wright	1	19 August 1966	Sydney, New South Wales	
The Destroyer	1	3 September 1966	Melbourne, Victoria	
Spiros Arion	3	29 October 1966	Melbourne, Victoria	
Ray Stevens	2	2 December 1966	Sydney, New South Wales	
Billy White Wolf	1	11 February 1967	Melbourne, Victoria	White Wolf vacated the Australian Heavyweight Championship after winning this title.
Killer Kowalski	4	May 1967	Melbourne, Victoria	
Tex McKenzie	1	July 1967	Melbourne, Victoria	
Skull Murphy	2	12 August 1967	Melbourne, Victoria	
Bearcat Wright	2	19 August 1967	Melbourne, Victoria	
Killer Kowalski	5	1 September 1967	Melbourne, Victoria	
Mario Milano	1	8 September 1967	Sydney, New South Wales	
King Curtis Iaukea	1	30 September 1967	Sydney, New South Wales	
Mark Lewin	2	13 October 1967	Sydney, New South Wales	
Ripper Collins	1	October 1967	?	
Mario Milano	2	October 1967	?	
Killer Karl Kox	1	January 1968	Melbourne, Victoria	
Spiros Arion	4	January 1968	Melbourne, Victoria	
Gorilla Monsoon	1	16 February 1968	Sydney, New South Wales	
Spiros Arion	5	22 March 1968	Sydney, New South Wales	
Baron Mikel Scicluna	1	15 June 1968	Sydney, New South Wales	
Mario Milano	3	17 August 1968	Melbourne, Victoria	
Toru Tanaka	2	20 September 1968	Sydney, New South Wales	
Tex McKenzie	2	15 November 1968	Sydney, New South Wales	
Skull Murphy	3	18 November 1968	Adelaide, South Australia	
“Cowboy” Bob Ellis	1	7 February 1969	Sydney, New South Wales	
Killer Karl Kox	2	14 February 1969	Sydney, New South Wales	
Spiros Arion	6	21 February 1969	Sydney, New South Wales	
The Spoiler	1	4 April 1969	Sydney, New South Wales	
Mario Milano	4	9 May 1969	Sydney, New South Wales	
WCW joined the National Wrestling Alliance in August 1969, still recognizing this world title.
Killer Karl Kox	3	19 September 1969	Sydney, New South Wales	
Billy Robinson	1	31 October 1969	Sydney, New South Wales	
King Curtis Iaukea	2	19 December 1969	Sydney, New South Wales	
Dominic DeNucci	4	January 1970	Sydney, New South Wales	
King Curtis Iaukea	3	April 1970	?	This title change occurred no later than this date.
Stan Stasiak	1	December 1970	?	
King Curtis Iaukea	4	December 1970	?	
The title was retired in 1971 and replaced with the NWA Austra-Asian Heavyweight Championship. WCW then recognized the NWA World Heavyweight Championship as the world title.

== See also ==
- Professional wrestling in Australia
- World Championship Wrestling (Australia)
- International Wrestling Australia
