= Killer Karl Kox =

American professional wrestler (1931–2011)

Personal information
- Born: Herbert Alan Gerwig; April 26, 1931 Baltimore, Maryland, U.S.
- Died: November 10, 2011 (aged 80) Dallas, Texas, U.S.

Professional wrestling career
- Ring names: Durwood Gerwig; Herb Gerwig; Karl Kox; Killer Carl Cox; Killer Karl Kox; Killer Kox; Masked Gaucho #2; Masked Menace; The Spirit; Spoiler #1; Spoiler #2; Tony Gerwig
- Billed height: 6 ft 1 in (185 cm)
- Billed weight: 260 lb (118 kg)
- Billed from: Amarillo, Texas, U.S.
- Trained by: Fred Bozack; Ralph "Ruffy" Silverstein
- Debut: 1954
- Retired: 1983
- Military service
- Allegiance: United States
- Branch: United States Marine Corps
- Service years: 1944–1946
- Conflicts: Korean War (Battle of Chosin Reservoir)

Herbert Alan Gerwig (April 26, 1931 – November 10, 2011) was an American professional wrestler, better known by his ring name, Killer Karl Kox. Kox competed in the National Wrestling Alliance as well as international promotions such as All Japan Pro Wrestling, the International Wrestling Alliance and World Championship Wrestling during the 1960s and 1970s.

== Early life ==
Gerwig was born in Baltimore, Maryland, where his father worked for The Baltimore Sun. He attended Forest Park High School. After graduating, Gerwig enlisted in the United States Marine Corps.

== Professional wrestling career ==
Gerwig was trained as a professional wrestler by Fred Bozack and Ralph "Ruffy" Silverstein, debuting in 1954.

Gerwig reportedly earned the name, Killer, when he performed his famous finishing move, the brainbuster, on his opponent by holding him upside down for a period of time and allowing the blood to rush to the brain. As a singles heel through the sixties, he was a top-of-card fixture battling well-established crowd favorites such as Mark Lewin, Spiros Arion, Tex McKenzie, Dominic DeNucci, and Mario Milano. Enormous numbers from Australia's nascent ethnic community turned out to support Arion, Denucci, and Milano, and Kox risked riots at every appearance.

On February 21, 1967, he and "Iron" Mike DiBiase defeated Pedro Morales and Ricky Romero to win the Worldwide Wrestling Associates' WWA World Tag Team Championship. He defeated Buddy Rogers to win the MWCW North American Championship in March 1968. Fans longed to see the brainbuster deployed on the side of good, and this boon was granted in 1971 when the Killer turned into a babyface in a nationally televised mea culpa - he pledged to change his ways on a solemn promise to his dying mother.

This created much heat in the Australian wrestling promotion, where the fixture was an ongoing television "war" between the good guys referred to as the "People's Army" (Lewin, Curtis, Arion, Milano and visiting faces from overseas) and the "mercenary soldiers" managed by Kentucky biker / preacher Big Bad John. The turning of the tables saw the erstwhile Killer create great excitement in tag matches against his former heel comrades Abdullah the Butcher, Brute Bernard, Dick "The Bulldog" Brower, Tiger Jeet Singh, Waldo Von Erich and Japanese heels like Mr. Fuji and the Tojo Brothers (Hiro "The Great" Tojo and Hito Tojo).

He lost to Johnny Weaver on May 4, 1973, in a hair vs mask match while working as the "Masked Menace". He won the Florida Brass Knuckles Championship by winning a tournament, and also defended the title against Rocky Johnson and Steve Keirn. In February 1978, he defeated Dusty Rhodes to win the NWA Florida Heavyweight Championship.

At a wrestling show later that year, Kox was wrestling a match when a fan started to repeatedly hit him with an umbrella. Security got involved and detained the fan, but instead of kicking the fan out of the show, Kox requested that they bring him into a backroom with the door locked. He allegedly requested that security not let him out until it was alright doing so. Security took the fan to a back room and locked the door. After Kox's match ended, he told security to open the door and he went in. Five minutes later, Kox walked out of the room and the fan was found lying on the floor, covered in blood and was knocked out unconscious.

In the wrestling profession, Killer Karl Kox was always a popular figure for his humor, behind-the-scenes jokes and inventiveness in furthering the promotion ("the greatest gimmicks man in the business" said one colleague). His grudge matches were well-calibrated, building through a series of disqualifications and non-decisions through run-in interference, and often climaxing in a conditional match in which "the loser packs his bags and leaves town." This saw off one or the other of the combatants as they travelled to fulfill other promotional runs in other countries; battle would be re-joined next season when the participants returned for another profitable run.

Dick Murdoch once listed a number of people he had supposedly defeated and put out of wrestling, including a midget wrestler from the 1940s (few people caught the joke reference) and also listed on Herb Gelwig, (who was of course Killer Karl Kox with whom he teamed several times and was still quite active.) On October 9, 1979, he defeated Bob Armstrong to win the vacant NWA Georgia Heavyweight Championship.

Kox was cheered in Australia for one of the few times in his life when he faced the team of Abdullah the Butcher and Bulldog Brower. Among Killer Karl Kox's famous matches in Australia, his feuds with man-mountain Haystacks Calhoun usually involved the insinuation of foreign objects into the proceedings by Kox. At the end of one season, Kox "left Australia for medical treatment in the states" when, in a strap match with Bulldog Brower, his eye was nearly removed (the wound was unbandaged to show the television audience). A headline making event was when a television match for the IWA World Heavyweight Championship against Spiros Arion was declared ended due to time limit by well-loved commentator Jack Little. Kox responded by delivering the brainbuster to the unfortunate Little, who was hospitalized and required to call matches the following month in a neck brace.

Kox retired from professional wrestling in 1983. He made his final wrestling-related appearance at VCCW Quest for the Crown II in August 2011, taking part in a meet and greet as well as later presenting the championship to Scot Summers.

== Death ==
Gerwig suffered a stroke on October 20, 2011. He died of a heart attack on November 10, 2011, at the UT Southwestern Medical Center in Dallas, Texas.

== Championships and accomplishments ==
- All Japan Pro Wrestling
  - NWA International Tag Team Championship (1 time) - with Cyclone Negro
- American Wrestling Association
  - Nebraska Heavyweight Championship (1 time)
- Cauliflower Alley Club
  - Posthumous Award (2022)
- Central States Wrestling
  - NWA Central States Heavyweight Championship (1 time)
  - NWA Central States Tag Team Championship (1 time) – with Takachiho
  - NWA North American Tag Team Championship (Central States version) (2 times) – with K.O. Kox (K.O. Kox's partner was Killer Kox/Freddie Sweetan)
- Championship Wrestling from Florida
  - NWA Brass Knuckles Championship (Florida version) (3 times)
  - NWA Florida Heavyweight Championship (1 time)
  - NWA United States Tag Team Championship (Florida version) (4 times) - with Bobby Duncum (1 time), Dick Slater (1 time), and Jimmy Garvin (2 times)
- Georgia Championship Wrestling
  - NWA Georgia Heavyweight Championship (1 time)
  - NWA Macon Heavyweight Championship (1 time)
- Japan Wrestling Association
  - All Asia Tag Team Championship (1 time) - with Joe Carollo
- NWA Big Time Wrestling
  - NWA Brass Knuckles Championship (Texas version) (3 times)
  - NWA Texas Tag Team Championship (1 time) - with Great Malenko
  - NWA World Tag Team Championship (Texas Version) (1 time) with Fritz Von Erich
- NWA Tri-State / Mid-South Wrestling
  - Mid-South Tag Team Championship (1 time) - with Junkyard Dog
  - NWA North American Heavyweight Championship (Tri-State version) (1 time)
  - NWA United States Tag Team Championship (Tri-State version) (3 times) - with Dick Murdoch (1 time), Bob Sweetan (1 time), and Ken Patera (1 time)
- NWA Western States Sports
  - NWA Brass Knuckles Championship (Amarillo version) (1 time)
  - NWA Western States Heavyweight Championship (1 time)
- Professional Wrestling Hall of Fame and Museum
  - Class of 2020
- Pro Wrestling Illustrated
  - PWI ranked him # 417 of the 500 best singles wrestlers during the "PWI Years" in 2003
- Southeastern Championship Wrestling
  - NWA Southeastern Heavyweight Championship (Northern Division) (3 times)
- Texas Wrestling Hall of Fame
  - Class of 2013
- World Championship Wrestling
  - IWA World Heavyweight Championship (3 times)
  - IWA World Tag Team Championship (1 time) - with Skull Murphy
- Worldwide Wrestling Associates
  - WWA World Tag Team Championship (3 times) – with "Iron" Mike DiBiase (1 time)
