= NWA Western States Heavyweight Championship =

- The current NWA Western States Heavyweight Championship belt, introduced by NWA Vendetta Pro Wrestling in 2015. Identical to the NWA Western States Heritage Championship belt used from 1987-1989.

Details
- Promotion: Western States Sports; Vendetta Pro Wrestling, January 2015- September 2017
- Date established: 1969
- Date retired: 1981 (Western States Sports); September 2017 (Vendetta Pro Wrestling)
Statistics
- First champion: Dory Funk, Sr.
- Most reigns: Terry Funk (12 reigns)

The NWA Western States Heavyweight Championship was a professional wrestling title in the National Wrestling Alliance's Amarillo, Texas territory, Western States Sports.

The title was in use from 1969, when it replaced Amarillo's version of the NWA North American Heavyweight Championship, through the promotion's 1981 closure.

The title was revived in 2015 by NWA Vendetta Pro Wrestling, with a new champion being crowned via a tournament held in Santa Maria, California. This was an eight-man, single-elimination tournament, won by "Loverboy" Matt Riviera. Though created as a "new" title, all previous champions have received recognition.

The original title was not related to the NWA Western States Heritage Championship, which was used in Jim Crockett Promotions from 1987 to 1989, though the 2015 version does use the same title belt design, and as such, is often referred to as the Western States "Heritage" Championship.

Title retired once again as of September 8, 2017 when titleholder Rik Luxury defeated Vendetta Pro Wrestling Heavyweight Champion Apostle Judah Mathew to unify the two titles into the new Vendetta Pro Wrestling Western States Heavyweight Championship.

== Title history ==
Silver areas in the history indicate periods of unknown lineage. An (n) indicates that a title changes occurred no later than the listed date.

Wrestler:	Times:	Date:	Location:	Notes:
Dory Funk, Sr.	1	June 12, 1969	Amarillo, Texas	Funk was the final holder of the Amarillo version of the NWA North American Heavyweight Championship and awarded the title when it was replaced.
Tex McKenzie	1	November 13, 1969	Amarillo, Texas	By forfeit after Funk suffers arm injury previous night in Lubbock, Texas.
The Beast	1	November 24, 1969	Amarillo, Texas	
Ricky Romero	1	February 2, 1970	El Paso, Texas	
Title vacated on February 20, 1970 when Romero wins the Rocky Mountain Heavyweight Championship.
Terry Funk	1	March 19, 1970	Amarillo, Texas	The match ends with a controversial decision when two referees award the victory to each man.
The Beast	2	March 1970 (n)		Awarded back sometime after March 26, 1970 and defends in Abilene, TX on March 27, 1970.
Terry Funk	2	May 7, 1970	Amarillo, Texas	
Bull Ramos	1	July 1, 1970	Lubbock, Texas	
Terry Funk	3	July 7, 1970	Amarillo, Texas	
Pak Song	1	July 16, 1970	Amarillo, Texas	
The Spartan (Ricky Hunter)	1	February 25, 1971	Amarillo, Texas	
The Spartan (Ricky Hunter)	2	April 14, 1971	Amarillo, Texas	
Terry Funk	4	April 29, 1971	Amarillo, Texas	
Mr. Wrestling (Gordon Nelson)	1	June 21, 1971 (n)	Amarillo, Texas	Sometime after May 6, 1971.
Terry Funk	5	June 28, 1971	Abilene, Texas	
Ciclón Negro	1	July 6, 1971	Odessa, Texas	
Terry Funk	6	August 3, 1971	Odessa, Texas	
Pak Song	2	August 5, 1971	Amarillo, Texas	
Terry Funk	7	August 12, 1971	Amarillo, Texas	
Ciclón Negro	2	August 26, 1971	Amarillo, Texas	
Dory Funk	2	September 9, 1971	Amarillo, Texas	
Title vacated when Funk is injured during the match. Ciclón Negro and Terry Funk wrestle to a draw for the vacant title on September 16, 1971 in Amarillo, Texas.
Ciclón Negro	3	September 30, 1971	Amarillo, Texas	Defeats Terry Funk.
Lord Alfred Hayes	1	December 2, 1971	Amarillo, Texas	
Duke Myers	1	March 13, 1972	Abilene, Texas	Maybe held up after this match.
Lord Alfred Hayes	2	March 20, 1972	Abilene, Texas	Maybe for the held-up title.
Ciclón Negro	4	June 13, 1972	Odessa, Texas	
Lord Alfred Hayes	3	June 20, 1972	Odessa, Texas	
Ciclón Negro	5	June 29, 1972	Amarillo, Texas	
Lord Alfred Hayes	4	July 6, 1972	Amarillo, Texas	
Dory Funk	3	August 16, 1972	Lubbock, Texas	
Lord Alfred Hayes	5	August 21, 1972	Abilene, Texas	Billed as Champion.
Ciclón Negro	6	August 31, 1972	Amarillo, Texas	
Terry Funk	8	November 1972 (n)		Possibly on November 12, 1972 in Clovis, New Mexico.
Karl Von Steiger	1	1972 (n)		
Ricky Romero	2	1973 (n)		
King Curtis Iaukea	1	1973 (n)		
Ciclón Negro	7	July 6, 1973	Abilene, Texas	
Terry Funk	9	July 10, 1973 (n)		
Kung Fu Lee	1	October 18, 1973	Amarillo, Texas	
Title held up Against Terry Funk.
Terry Funk	10	October 25, 1973	Amarillo, Texas	Defeated Kung Fu Lee in a rematch.
Buck Robley	1	January 24, 1974	Clovis, New Mexico	
Terry Funk	11	March 3, 1974	Clovis, New Mexico	
Karl Von Steiger	2	March 1974 (n)		
Bob Backlund	1	March 9, 1974	Amarillo, Texas	
Dick Murdoch	1	May 10, 1974		
Bob Backlund	2	May 22, 1974	Lubbock, Texas	
Karl Von Steiger	3	May 23, 1974	Amarillo, Texas	
Dick Murdoch	2	May 30, 1974	Amarillo, Texas	
Title vacant in June 1974 after winning the NWA International Title.
Siegfried Stanke	1	July 4, 1974	Amarillo, Texas	Defeats Akio Sato in a 4-man tournament final.
Akio Sato	1	August 16, 1974		
Siegfried Stanke	2	August 24, 1974		
Bob Backlund	3	September 4, 1974		
Killer Karl Kox	1	September 10, 1974	Odessa, Texas	
Bob Backlund	4	September 11, 1974	Lubbock, Texas	Maybe billed as champion.
Jim Dillon	1	September 19, 1974	Amarillo, Texas	Defeated Killer Karl Kox.
Terry Funk	12	October 17, 1974	Amarillo, Texas	
Title vacated when Funk left for Florida in April 1975.
Bobby Jaggers	1	June 11, 1975	Lubbock, Texas	Defeats Nick Kozak 4-man a tournament final.
Ray Candy	1	July 30, 1975	Lubbock, Texas	
Bruiser Brody	1	October 17, 1975	Lubbock, Texas	
Scott Casey	1	December 18, 1975	Amarillo, Texas	
Jerry Brisco	1	April 16, 1976	Amarillo, Texas	
Scott Casey	2	June 4, 1976	Lubbock, Texas	
Tank Patton	1	October 13, 1976	Abilene, Texas	
Super Destroyer	1	February 24, 1977	Amarillo, Texas	
Doug Somers	1	April 7, 1977	Amarillo, Texas	
Bull Ramos	2	September 1977 (n)	Wichita Falls, Texas	
Ricky Romero	3	December 15, 1977	Amarillo, Texas	
Roger Kirby	1	April 14, 1978 (n)		
Ricky Romero	4	July 21, 1978 (n)		Sometime after June 27, 1978; still champion as of August 10, 1978.
Title vacated.
Bob Morgan	1	February 28, 1980	Amarillo, Texas	Defeats Larry Lane in tournament final.
Larry Lane	1	March 6, 1980	Amarillo, Texas	Won a tournament.
Bob Morgan	2	March 7, 1980	Amarillo, Texas	
Title vacated.
Ricky Romero	5	August 27, 1981	Amarillo, Texas	Defeated Doug Somers in a tournament final after the initial match on August 20, 1981 ends with DDQ.
Title retired in 1981 when the promotion closed. Revived in 2015 by Vendetta Pro Wrestling.
Matt Riviera	1	January 17, 2015	Santa Maria, California	Defeated Brian Kendrick in a tournament final.
Jeff Jarrett	1	May 15, 2015	King City, California	
Matt Riviera	2	May 17, 2015	Chowchilla, California	
Ricky Ruffin	1	October 30, 2015	Santa Maria, California	
Rik Luxury	1	May 20, 2016	Santa Maria, California	
On September 8, 2017, Luxury defeated Apostle Judah Mathew to claim his Vendetta Pro Wrestling Heavyweight title, unifying it with his NWA Western States title to form the Vendetta Pro Wrestling Western States Heavyweight Championship

=== 2015 NWA Western States Championship Tournament ===
January 17, 2015 - Santa Maria, California

First Round
1	Brian Kendrick
8	Ricardo Rodriguez
4	Chris Masters
5	Jody Kristofferson
2	Rik Luxury
7	Billy Blade
3	Americos
6	Matt Riviera

Semifinals
Brian Kendrick
Jody Kristofferson
Rik Luxury
Matt Riviera

Finals
Brian Kendrick
Matt Riviera

== See also ==
- List of National Wrestling Alliance championships
- NWA North American Heavyweight Championship (Amarillo version)
- NWA Western States Heritage Championship
- NWA Western States Tag Team Championship
