= NWA Brass Knuckles Championship (Amarillo version) =

The Amarillo version of the NWA Brass Knuckles Championship was a secondary championship that was defended in Dory Funk, Sr.'s Western States Sports promotion based in Amarillo, Texas. Originally created in August 1964, the title was used briefly before being abandoned. It was reactivated three years later and was defended sporadically until the promotion closed in 1981. The championship was used in specialty matches in which the combatants would wear brass knuckles. There were other such championships used in a number of NWA territories throughout the America, with some of the more prominent ones being Fritz Von Erich's World Class Championship Wrestling and Eddie Graham's Championship Wrestling from Florida.

== Title history ==
Wrestler	Reigns	Date	Location	Notes
Dory Funk, Sr.	1	1962		Stripped in 1962.
Fritz Von Erich	1	September 19, 1962	Lubbock, Texas	Defeats Don Leo Jonathan.
The Sheik	1	January 1964		
Killer Karl Kox	1	January 30, 1964	Amarillo, Texas	
Louie Tillet	1	August 24, 1964		Still champion as of October 20, 1964.
The Lawman	1	March 13, 1967		
Title vacated		September 1967		Thunderbolt Patterson defeats Dory Funk Jr. to win the title on September 11, 1967.Tillet and The Lawman wrestle for the vacant title on September 14, 1967 in Amarillo, Texas, but the match ends as a no contest.
The Lawman	2	September 28, 1967	Amarillo, Texas	Defeats Thunderbolt Patterson in Lubbock, Texas and Jose Lothario defeats Patterson on October 4, 1967.
Thunderbolt Patterson	1	October 5, 1967	Amarillo, Texas	Loses to Dr. Blood in Lubbock, Texas on November 1, 1967 but continues to be recognized in Amarillo, Texas.
Dory Funk	2	November 22, 1967	Amarillo, Texas	
Thunderbolt Patterson	2	January 18, 1968		
Kurt Von Brauner	1	February 29, 1968	Amarillo, Texas	
Dory Funk	3	March 6, 1968	Lubbock, Texas	Local newspaper reports that Funk defeats Karl Von Brauner but it may be a mistake.
Title vacated		March 1968		
Larry Henning	1	March 14, 1968		
Dory Funk	4	March 19, 1968	Odessa, Texas	
Kurt Von Brauner	2	May 1968		
Thunderbolt Patterson	3	May 30, 1968	Amarillo, Texas	
Pat Patterson	1	July 18, 1968	Amarillo, Texas	
Dory Funk	5	November 28, 1968	Amarillo, Texas	
Title vacated		April 23, 1968		After the win and the title isn't used.
The Lawman	3	December 1969		
Dick Murdoch	1	January 1, 1970	Amarillo, Texas	
The Lawman	4	January 30, 1970	Abilene, Texas	
Title vacated		March 27, 1970		
Apache Bull Ramos	1	June 12, 1970		
Bob Griffin	1	August 27, 1970	Amarillo, Texas	
Thunderbolt Patterson	4	October 15, 1970	Amarillo, Texas	
Dory Funk	6	November 19, 1970	Amarillo, Texas	
Mr. Wrestling (Gordon Nelson)	1	February 3, 1971	Lubbock, Texas	
Dory Funk	7	February 24, 1971	Amarillo, Texas	
Title vacated		June 8, 1971		
Dick Murdoch	2	February 1, 1972		
Ricky Romero	1	March 20, 1972	El Paso, Texas	
Bobby Duncum, Sr.	1	March 27, 1972	El Paso, Texas	Loses to Ricky Romero on April 3, 1972 in El Paso, TX but may continue to be recognized in other cities.
Pak Song	1	April 5, 1972	Lubbock, Texas	Defeats Duncum.
Bobby Duncum	2	April 6, 1972	Amarillo, Texas	Pak Song may be still billed as champion in Lubbock on April 12, 1972.
Ray Hunter	1	May 17, 1972	Lubbock, Texas	
Dick Murdoch	3	May 18, 1972	Amarillo, Texas	Loses to Pak Song on July 3, 1972 in Abilene, Texas but continues to be recognized in other cities and Murdoch defeats Pak on July 31, 1972 to regain the recognition in Abilene.
Terry Funk	1	July 13, 1972	Amarillo, Texas	Funk defeats Murdoch on August 7, 1972 for the recognition in Abilene, Texas and still champion as of September 14, 1972.
Ciclon Negro	1	October 1972		
Terry Funk	2	November 1972		
Ciclon Negro	2	February 11, 1973		
Ricky Romero	2	October 4, 1973	Amarillo, Texas	
Killer Karl Krupp	1	November 1, 1973	Amarillo, Texas	
Killer Karl Kox	2	December 13, 1973	Amarillo, Texas	
Dick Murdoch	4	May 2, 1974		
Title vacated		May 9, 1974		
Mark Lewin	1	August 16, 1974	Abilene, Texas	Wins a 4-man tournament against Jim Dillon, Ben Justice and The Patriot.
Siegfried Stanke	1	August 27, 1974	Odessa, Texas	Mark Lewin again loses to Karl Von Steiger on August 28, 1974 in Lubbock, Texas.
Jim Dillon	1	October 4, 1974	Abilene, Texas	
Killer Karl Kox	3	December 26, 1974		
Karl Von Steiger	1	April 1975		
Scott Casey	1	April 17, 1975	Amarillo, Texas	
Bobby Jaggers	1	May 7, 1975	Lubbock, Texas	Repeated next day in Amarillo, Texas.
Ray Stevens	1	June 30, 1975		
Johnny Starr	1	July 30, 1975	Lubbock, Texas	Wins by forfeit when Stevens no-shows and Stevens continue to be recognized in Amarillo, Texas and defends against Starr on July 31, 1975.
Ray Stevens	2	August 6, 1975	Amarillo, Texas	
The Lawman	5	August 28, 1975	Amarillo, Texas	
Ray Stevens	3	September 18, 1975	Amarillo, Texas	Still champion as of October 9, 1975.
Hank James	1	April 1976		Still champion as of June 14, 1976.
Dennis Stamp	1	July 7, 1976		
Dory Funk, Jr.	1	September 3, 1976	Lubbock, Texas	
Dennis Stamp	2	September 9, 1976	Lubbock, Texas	
Dory Funk, Jr.	2	September 30, 1976	Amarillo, Texas	Dennis Stamp defeats Funk but the title change is void due to Stamp's usage of the ropes for leverage.
Dennis Stamp	3	November 26, 1976	Lubbock, Texas	
Dennis Stamp	4	March 4, 1977		
Ciclon Negro	3	March 17, 1977		
Terry Funk	3	October 14, 1977	Lubbock, Texas	Also wins the Dallas version, defeating Killer Karl Krupp on May 6, 1978 in Houston, Texas.
Ciclon Negro	4	October 1977		
Terry Funk	4	October 20, 1977	Amarillo, Texas	May be a repeat of the Lubbock match.
Mr. Pogo	1	June 15, 1978	Amarillo, Texas	Still champion as of November 8, 1978.
El Mongol	1	June, 1979		
Dick Murdoch	5	August 17, 1979	Lubbock, Texas	Still champion as of August 29, 1979.
Toru Tanaka	1	April 14, 1980	Fort. Worth, Texas	Defeats Bruiser Brody to win the Dallas version and is also recognized in West Texas; still champion as of May 6, 1980.
Bruiser Brody	1	1980		
Title vacated		1980		Due to Brody's Japanese commitment.
Stan Stasiak	1	August 7, 1980	Amarillo, Texas	Wins a 10-man battle royal for the vacated title and still champion as of September 30, 1980.
Don Fargo	1	August 27, 1981		Title is abandoned when the promotion closes in 1981.

== See also ==
- List of National Wrestling Alliance championships
