= List of former International Wrestling Association personnel =

International Wrestling Association was a professional wrestling promotion based in Cleveland, Ohio from 1975 to 1978. Former employees in the IWA consisted of professional wrestlers, managers, play-by-play and color commentators, announcers, interviewers and referees.

== Alumni ==
=== Male wrestlers ===
Birth name:	Ring name(s):	Tenure:	Notes
Ángel Acevedo	The Cuban Assassin	1977	
Louis Acocella	Gino Brito	1975	
Alberto Amessa	Tony Romano	1975	
Afa Anoaʻi ^{†}	Afa	1975–1976	
Sika Anoaʻi ^{†}	Sika	1975–1976	
Douglas Baker ^{†}	Ox Baker	1975	
Levi Banks	Levi Banks / Sweet Daddy Banks	1975–1976	
George Becker ^{†}	George Becker	1975	
Mike Boyette ^{†}	The California Hippie / Mike Boyette	1976	
Adolfo Bresciano ^{†}	Dino Bravo	1975–1976	
Pedro Columbo	Chief White Cloud	1976	
Nelson Combs^{†}	Nelson Royal	1975–1976	
Giacomo Costa^{†}	Al Costello	1975	
Pablo Crispín ^{†}	Great Goliath	1975	
George Dahmer ^{†}	Chief White Owl	1975–1976	
Nicholas DeCarlo	Nick DeCarlo	1976–1977	
Vincente Denigris^{†}	Vittorio Apollo	1975	
Bill Eadie	Bobo Mongol	1975	
Robert Ellis	Cowboy Bob Ellis	1975	
Johnny Evans^{†}	Reginald Love	1975	
Harvey Evers ^{†}	Rip Hawk	1975	
Hipolito Figueroa ^{†}	Paul Figueroa	1975	
Buck Forrester ^{†}	Buck Forrest	1975–1976	
Jean Gagné^{†}	Pierre Martel	1975	
Richard Garza ^{†}	Mighty Igor	1975–1976	
Richard Gland ^{†}	Bulldog Brower	1975–1977	
Carlos González	Carlos Colón	1975	
William Goodman ^{†}	Big Bad John	1977	
Ib Solvang Hansen ^{†}	Eric the Red	1975–1976	
Larry Heiniemi	Lars Anderson / Larry Heiniemi	1975	
Ron Hill	Ron Hill / The Golden Gladiator	1975–1976	
Wes Hutchings	Hartford Love	1975–1976	
Don Johnson ^{†}	Danny Sharpe	1975	
Francis Julian ^{†}	Frank Marconi	1975	
Don Kalt^{†}	Don Fargo / Don Fonzo Fargo	1976–1977	
Ernie Ladd ^{†}	Ernie Ladd	1975	
Jerry Lawler	Jerry Lawler	1975	
Luis Martinez ^{†}	Louis Martinez / Luis Martinez	1975–1977	
George McArthur ^{†}	George "Cry Baby" Cannon	1975	
Benny McCrary ^{†}	Benny McGuire	1976	
Billy McCrary ^{†}	Billy McGuire	1976	
Frank McKenzie ^{†}	Tex McKenzie	1975	
Hugh Meador ^{†}	Tiny Bell	1975–1976	
Oscar Mollinar	Ali Baba	1975	
George Momberg ^{†}	Killer Karl Krupp	1976	
Steve Musulin ^{†}	Stonewall Jackson	1977	
Joseph Novo^{†}	Butcher Brannigan	1976	
Walter Nurnberg ^{†}	Karl Von Stroheim	1976–1977	
Juan Onaindia ^{†}	Juan Sebastian	1977	
Claude Patterson	Thunderbolt Patterson	1975	
José Miguel Pérez ^{†}	Miguel Pérez	1975	
Oreal Perras^{†}	Ivan Koloff	1975	
Ron Pope	The Magnificent Zulu	1977	
Buddy Porter ^{†}	Buddy Porter	1975–1976	
Phil Potts	Phil Watson / Whipper Watson Jr.	1975–1976	
Sylvester Ritter ^{†}	Sylvester Ritter	1976–1977	
Aaron Rodríguez	Mil Máscaras	1975–1976	
Tomás Marín Rodríguez	Tomás Marín	1975	
Willi Rutkowsky^{†}	Kurt Von Stroheim	1976	
Tony Silipini^{†}	Tony Marino	1975	
Frank Stanley	Frank Stanley	1977	
Richard Steinborn^{†}	Dick Steinborn	1975	
Edward Strevel ^{†}	Dale Starr	1975	
Jerry Summers	Ed Fury / Jerry Summers	1976–1977	
Bruce Swayze	Beautiful Bruce / Bruce Swayze	1975–1976	
Newton Tattrie ^{†}	Geto Mongol	1975	
Bill Terry ^{†}	Kurt Von Hess	1975–1977	
Troy Thompson ^{†}	Troy Graham	1975	
Lajos Tiza ^{†}	Lou Thesz	1975	
William Vaughn ^{†}	Rip Tyler	1976–1977	
Michel Vigneault ^{†}	Michel Martel	1975	
Dennis Waters	Johnny Powers	1975–1977	
Jacky Weicz	Andre Carpentier	1975	
Pez Whatley ^{†}	Pez Whatley / Pistol Pronto	1975–1977	
Jim Wilson	Jim Wilson	1975	
Jonathan Wisniski	Greg Valentine	1976	
Owen Yow ^{†}	Billy Hines	1976	
Unknown	Abdul Zaatar	1976	
Unknown	Ati Tago	1976	
Unknown	Bad News Beach	1975	
Unknown	Bill Williams	1975	
Unknown	Bull Gregory	1975	
Unknown^{†}	Buzz Tyler	1976–1977	
Unknown	The Cuban Assassin #2	1977	
Joe Bandiera	Joe Turco	1975, 1977	
Unknown ^{†}	Johnny Hunter	1975	
Unknown	Johnny Ringo	1976	
Unknown	L.D. Lewis	1976	
Unknown	Marshall Lewis	1975	
Unknown	Mike Freeman	1976	
Unknown	Sonny King	1976	
Unknown	Victor Rivera	1975	

=== Female wrestlers ===
Birth name:	Ring name(s):	Tenure:	Notes
Ramona Isbell^{†}	Ramona Isbell	1975	
Evelina Molina	Estelle Morino	1975	
Natasha Rahme	Natasha	1976	
Cora Svonsteckik ^{†}	Cora Combs	1953	
Beverly Wenhold	Beverly Shade	1975	
Marva Wingo ^{†}	Marva Scott	1975	
Unknown ^{†}	Barbara Owens	1975	
Unknown	Daisy Mae	1975–1977	
Unknown	Mary DeLeon	1975	
Unknown	Sandra Partlowe	1976–1977	

=== Midget wrestlers ===
Birth name:	Ring name(s):	Tenure:	Notes
Jonathan Adams ^{†}	Little John	1975, 1977–1978	
Marcel Gauthier ^{†}	Sky Low Low	1975	
Jean Jacques Girard ^{†}	Little Brutus	1975	
Stanley Littlejohn ^{†}	Little Coco	1975	
Roger Tomlin ^{†}	Little Boy Blue	1975	
Pierre Villeneuve^{†}	Farmer Pete	1975–1975	
Unknown	Pee Wee Lopez	1975–1976	

=== Stables and tag teams ===
Tag team/Stable(s)	Members	Tenure(s)
The Islanders	Afa Anoaʻi and Sika Anoaʻi	1975–1976
The Italian Connection	Gino Brito and Dino Bravo^{†}	1975
The Love Brothers	Hartford Love and Reginald Love	1975
The McGuire Twins^{†}	Benny McGuire and Billy McGuire	1976
The Mongols	Geeto Mongol^{†} and Bolo Mongol	1975
The Puerto Rican Playboys	Miguel Perez^{†} and Carlos Colon	1975
The Soul Patrol	Ernie Ladd^{†} and Thunderbolt Patterson	1975

=== Managers and valets ===
Birth name:	Ring name(s):	Tenure:	Notes
Edward Bogucki^{†}	Ivan Kalmikoff	1975	
Giacomo Costa ^{†}	Al Costello	1975	
George McCarther ^{†}	Crybaby Cannon	1975	

=== Commentators and interviewers ===
Birth name:	Ring name(s):	Tenure:	Notes
Ron Martinez ^{†}	Rick Martin	1975–1978	Ring announcer
Frank McKenzie	Tex McKenzie	1975	
Joseph Rizzo ^{†}	Jack Reynolds	1975	
Unknown	Rick Gattone	1975	Ring announcer
Unknown	Doug Weathers	1975	Ring announcer

=== Referees ===
Birth name:	Ring name(s):	Tenure:	Notes
Thomas Machlay	Tommy Young	1975	
Unknown	Billy Osborne	1975	
Unknown	Charlie Babb	1975	Timekeeper
Unknown^{†}	Charlie Smith	1975	

=== Other personnel ===
Birth name:	Ring name(s):	Tenure:	Notes
Eddie Einhorn^{†}	Eddie Einhorn	1975	Promoter
Albert Mandell^{†}	Al Mandell	1975–1978	
Pedro Martinez^{†}	Pedro Martinez	1975–1977	Promoter
Dennis Waters	Johnny Powers	1977–1978	Promoter
Unknown	Robert F. Hatch	1975–1976	IWA President
