= List of former National Wrestling Federation personnel =

The National Wrestling Federation was a professional wrestling promotion based in Buffalo, New York from 1970 to 1974 and in New York City from 1986 to 1994. Former employees in the NWF consisted of professional wrestlers, managers, play-by-play and color commentators, announcers, interviewers and referees.

== Alumni ==
=== Male wrestlers ===
Birth name:	Ring name(s):	Tenure:	Notes
Mike Alegado	King Kaluha	1987	
John Anson ^{†}	Karl Von Shotz	1973	
Douglas Baker ^{†}	Bob Baker / The Ox	1974	
Edward Bazzaza	Damien Kane	1986–1987	
Wayde Bowles ^{†}	Rocky Johnson	1987–1988	
Tom Buzanoski	TC Reynolds	1988	
Tom Brandi	Tom Brandi	1986–1987	
Tommy Cairo	Tommy Cairo	1993	
William Calhoun ^{†}	Haystacks Calhoun	1970–1971, 1973	
Allen Coage ^{†}	B.L. Brown	1982–1984, 1985–1988	
Giacomo Costa ^{†}	Al Costello	1972, 1974	
George Dahmer ^{†}	Chief White Owl	1970–1973	
Dominic DeNucci ^{†}	Dominic DeNucci / Don DeNucci	1970–1974, 1987	
Don Drake	D. C. Drake	1986–1988	
Michael Durham ^{†}	The Russian Assassin	1991	
Brian Fabian	Mr. Anthony	1986–1988, 1991	
Paul Fabian	Paul Fabian	1993	
Ed Farhat ^{†}	The Sheik	1970–1971, 1973	
Wayne Farris	Honky Tonk Man	1993	
Sam Fatu	The Tonga Kid	1986	
Frank Goodish ^{†}	Bruiser Brody	1986–1987	
Ib Solvang Hansen ^{†}	Eric the Animal / Eric the Red	1970–1974	
John Stanley Hansen II	Stan Hansen	1987	
Houston Harris ^{†}	Bobo Brazil	1970–1974	
John Harris ^{†}	Silo Sam	1988	
Frank Hill	Jules Strongbow	1987, 1991, 1993–1994	
James Johnson ^{†}	Luke Graham	1972	
Don Kalt ^{†}	Don Fargo / Don Fonzo Fargo	1972	
Ernie Ladd ^{†}	Ernie Ladd	1970–1972, 1974	
Michel Lamarche ^{†}	Mike Dubois	1972	
Guy Larose ^{†}	Hans Schmidt	1970	
Vito LoGrasso	Skull von Krush	1994	
Mike Maraldo	Ace Darling / Mike Maraldo	1993–1994	
Anthony Matteo	Tony Stetson	1987	
Edward McDaniel ^{†}	Wahoo McDaniel	1972	
Medardo Leon Jr. ^{†}	Ricky Lawless	1987	
Philip Livelsberger	The Bounty Hunter / Executioner #2	1991, 1993	
Jeff Miller	The Metal Maniac	1994	
George Momberg ^{†}	Karl Krupp	1973	
Hoyt Murdoch ^{†}	Dick Murdoch	1970	
Thadius Osborne	Li'l Abner Osborne	1970–1972	
Oreal Perras ^{†}	Ivan Koloff	1993	
Josip Peruzović ^{†}	Nikolai Volkoff	1993	
Gene Petit ^{†}	Cousin Luke	1987, 1989, 1991	
Ted Petty ^{†}	The Cheetah Kid	1991	
Antonio Pugliese ^{†}	Tony Parisi	1971–1974	
Robert Remus	Sgt. Slaughter	1986–1989	
Jacques Rougeau, Sr. ^{†}	Jacques Rougeau Sr.	1972–1973	
Raymond Rougeau	Raymond Rougeau	1972–1974	
Virgil Runnels, Jr. ^{†}	Dusty Rhodes	1970	
David Sammartino	David Sammartino	1988	
David Schultz	David Schults	1987	
Mikel Scicluna ^{†}	Michael Valentino	1971–1974	
Larry Shreve	Abdullah the Butcher	1972, 1986–1988, 1991	
Walter Sieber ^{†}	Waldo Von Erich	1971–1974	
Jimmy Snuka ^{†}	Jimmy Snuka	1994	
George Stipich ^{†}	Stan Stasiak	1974	
Bill Terry ^{†}	Kurt Von Hess	1970–1974	
Dennis Waters ^{†}	Johnny Powers	1970–1974	
Larry Winters ^{†}	Larry Winters	1986–1988, 1991, 1993–1994	
Edward Wiskoski	Colonel DeBeers	1988, 1993	
John Wisniski ^{†}	Johnny Valentine	1972	
Jonathan Wisniski	Baby Face Nelson / Johnny Fargo	1970–1972, 1974	
Dale Wolfe	Dusty Wolfe	1991	
Unknown	Baron Donatelli	1993	
Unknown	Bill Fishinger	1988	
Unknown	Carlos Rivera	1987	
Unknown	Dan the Man	1993	
Unknown	Eddie Miranda / Beach Boy #2	1987	
Unknown	EJ McCabe	1987	
Unknown	Jim Finnegan	1986	
Unknown	Gino Caruso	1994	
Unknown	Hot Shot Savage	1987	
Unknown	Jack Armstrong	1989	
Unknown	Jeff Gripely	1987	
Unknown ^{†}	Jerry Oates	1988	
John Madencia	J.B. Psycho	1973	
Unknown	Jimmy Londos	1987	
Unknown	Joey Royal	1987	
Unknown	Joey Savage	1987	
Unknown	Johnny Rotten	1993	
Unknown	Kevin Storm	1994	
Unknown	The Kodiak Bear	1994	
Unknown	Krusher Krugenoff	1989	
Unknown	Latin Lover	1993	
Unknown	The Libyan Sheik	1993	
Luis Martinez	Luis Martinez	1970–1973	
Unknown	Lumberjack Pierre	1988	
Unknown	The Masked Executioner	1970–1974	
Unknown	Randy Lewis	1987	
Unknown	Ricky Bouer	1987	
Unknown	Ricky Reid	1986	
Unknown	Sean Wilson	1993	
Unknown	Sheik Beast Ferquin	1988	
Unknown	Sheik El-Shaad	1987	
Unknown	Steve Sampson	1987	

=== Female wrestlers ===
Birth name:	Ring name(s):	Tenure:	Notes
Elizabeth Chase	Chainsaw Liz Chase	1986	
Dawn Marie Johnston	Dawn Marie		
Heidi Lee Morgan	Heidi Lee Morgan	1987	
Wendi Richter	Wendi Richter	1986–1987, 1989, 1991, 1993	
Shanon Sexton	Susan Sexton	1989	
Unknown	Angel of Death	1987, 1991, 1993–1994	
Unknown	Ashley Ryan	1987	
Unknown	Helen St. Charles	1987	
Unknown	Rusty "The Fox" Thomas	1993	
Unknown	Sweet Melanie	1987	

=== Stables and tag teams ===
Tag team/Stable(s)	Members	Tenure(s)
The Beach Boys	Larry Winters and Eddie Miranda	1987
Buddy Rose and Doug Somers	Buddy Rose and Doug Somers	1988
Masked Executioners	Executioner #1 and Executioner #2	1986–1987, 1991
The Fabulous Kangaroos	Al Costello and Don Kent	1970
The Fantastics	Bobby Fulton and Tommy Rogers	1987
The Fargo Brothers	Don Fargo and Johnny Fargo	1972
The Libyan Terrorists		1988
The Midnight Rockers	Shawn Michaels and Marty Jannetty	1988
The Motor City Madmen	Madman Mark	1987
The Mountain Men	Mountain Man #1 and Mountain Man #2	1987
The Nasty Boys	Brian Knobs and Jerry Sags	1988
The Oates Brothers	Jerry and Ted Oates	1988
The USA Express		1991
The Wild Samoans	Afa and Sika	1987–1988

=== Managers and valets ===
Birth name:	Ring name(s):	Tenure:	Notes
Norman Tarantino	Dr. Karl Farragut	1987-1994	Also worked in the NWF front office, was road manager, booker, edited video and sold shows for NWF. He left NWF to be a in become a partner ProStar Wrestling with DC Drake (he had fall out with Drake and left ProStar), he was asked to go back to NWF as road manager.

=== Commentators and interviewers ===
Birth name:	Ring name(s):	Tenure:	Notes
Carl Baker	Carl Baker		
Gary Michael Cappetta	Gary Michael Cappetta		
Paul Heyman	Paul Heyman	1986	
Ronnie Martinéz	Ronnie Martinéz	1970–1974	
Jack Reynolds	Jack Reynolds	1970–1974	

Notes
^{†} Indicates they are deceased.
^{‡} Indicates they died while they were employed with the National Wrestling Federation.
