= Ib Solvang Hansen =

Danish professional wrestler (1934–1978)

Personal information
- Born: August 1, 1934 Odense, Southern Denmark, Denmark
- Died: November 16, 1978 (aged 44) Tampa, Florida, U.S.
- Cause of death: Struck by car

Professional wrestling career
- Ring name(s): Eric the Red; Eric the Animal; Eric Hansen
- Billed height: 6 ft 1 in (1.85 m)
- Billed weight: 300 lb (140 kg)
- Billed from: Denmark
- Debut: 1968

Ib Solvang Hansen (August 1, 1934 – November 16, 1978) was a Danish professional wrestler, known by his ring name Eric the Red, who competed in North American and international regional promotions during the 1960s and 70s, including Atlantic Grand Prix Wrestling, Maple Leaf Wrestling and National Wrestling Federation.

One of the major stars in the short-lived International Wrestling Association, he was one of the few to find success in the National Wrestling Alliance following the IWA's closure, forming a successful tag team with Pak Song in Championship Wrestling from Florida before his death in 1978.

== Career ==
=== Early career (1968–1974) ===
Born in Odense, Denmark, Hansen emigrated to Canada during the mid-1950s and eventually became involved in professional wrestling making his debut in the Toronto-area for Frank Tunney's Maple Leaf Wrestling in 1968. As Eric the Red, a modern-day Viking, Hanson faced veterans such as Dutch Momberg, The Assassin, Wild Bull Curry and Tiger Jeet Singh during his first year and also formed a short-lived tag team with Whipper Billy Watson.

After becoming a "heel" in early 1969, he would face the former NWA World Heavyweight Champion in a series of matches throughout the year as well as some of the most popular wrestlers in the territory such as Paul Diamond and Edouard Carpentier. Later that year, he also appeared in the World Wide Wrestling Federation facing "The Canadian Wildman" Gene Dubois, Tony Altomare and Jack Vansky although he was mainly used as a preliminary wrestler and had left the promotion by late 1970. He would however make occasional appearances during the next several years, most notably facing WWWF World Heavyweight Champion Pedro Morales in September 1973 and, the following year, teaming with Baron Mikel Scicluna to defeat WWWF World Heavyweight Champion Bruno Sammartino & Johnny DeFazio in Hubbard, Ohio on November 1, 1974.

=== National Wrestling Federation (1970–1975) ===
Hansen soon began wrestling for the National Wrestling Federation, regularly appearing in Buffalo, New York and Cleveland, Ohio against many of the promotions top stars such as Chief White Owl and Dominic DeNucci during the early 1970s. He also became a well known face in the Pittsburgh-area during this time, facing Gorilla Monsoon, Frank Durso and Victor Rivera in memorable matches.

Briefly returning to Toronto to face Angelo Mosca, Vic Rossitani and Prince Pullins during the summer, he would return to the NWL by October 1972 under manager Tony Angelo as Eric the Animal, a wildman who carried a large bone to the ring and used as a foreign object. Feuding with NWF North American Heavyweight Champion Johnny Powers defeating him for the title in Buffalo on February 17, 1973, although he would lose it back to him within several weeks. He would also be involved in a controversial storyline violently attacking Jacques and Raymond Rougeau with his bone and subsequently resulting in a feud between the two for several weeks.

After a brief tour of the Maritimes in June, he also headlined several events at the Maple Leaf Gardens facing Leo Burke, The Sheik and NWA World Heavyweight Champion Jack Brisco on September 23. The following year, he would make occasional appearances in the Detroit-area for Ed Farhat losing to Dick the Bruiser on April 27, 1974. Facing Ernie Ladd and Bobo Brazil on the Cleveland-Buffalo circuit during the year, he also toured Japan during February–March including facing Antonio Inoki and, returning to Ontario, faced Luis Martinez and Dewey Robertson later that year.

In early 1975, Hansen began his first tour of the southeastern United States competing for Dick Steinborn in Atlanta, Georgia where he very quickly becoming one of the promotions top "heels". However, he was soon hired by Pedro Martinez to return to Cleveland to compete in the newly established International Wrestling Association which Martinez and TV sports mogul Eddie Einhorn were organizing to compete directly against the National Wrestling Alliance as the first national professional wrestling promotion in the United States.

Remaining one of the top stars in the promotion under manager George "Crybaby" Cannon, he feuded with IWA Heavyweight Champion Mil Mascaras throughout the country as the promotion toured the United States. During the tour, Hansen faced Lou Thesz losing to the then 59-year-old former NWA World Heavyweight Champion at the Roosevelt Stadium in Jersey City, New Jersey on August 7, 1975.

By the end of the year however, following the takeover of Johnny Powers after Eric Einhorn pulled out, Hansen remained with the IWA as it attempted to survive as a regional promotion in the Carolinas. He would also travel to Canada several times where his former manager George Cannon was a booker for the Eastern Sports Association.

=== From San Juan to Tulsa (1975–1978) ===
Like many other wrestlers who competed for the IWA, Hansen found little work in the National Wrestling Alliance and began wrestling overseas, eventually becoming a major star in the Puerto Rican-based World Wrestling Council. Capturing both the Puerto Rican and WWC North American titles, he also became involved in a violent feud with Carlos Colon which would result in several riots during late 1976.

Leaving the WWC in April 1977, Hansen returned to Toronto for a short while before moving on to World Class Championship Wrestling where he feuded with the Von Erich family for several months. The following year, he joined The Assassin in the Tri-State area in his feud with Randy Tyler during the spring on 1978. His allies soon turned against him however, when The Assassin and The Brute attacked him during a television taping in early July.

Teaming with Steven Little Bear, he eventually lost a loser-leaves-town match against The Assassin and The Brute at the Louisiana Superdome in New Orleans, Louisiana on July 22, 1978, with a record 31,000 in fans in attendance.

=== Championship Wrestling from Florida (1978) ===
On October 4, Hansen made his debut in Championship Wrestling from Florida defeating Phil Mercado at the Jai-Alai Fronton in Miami, Florida. Defeating Steve Brody in Ft. Lauderdale two days later, he was soon recruited by manager Sonny King for his stable along with Pak Song. Although defeating Rick Oliver in West Palm Beach on October 9, Hansen would be disqualified in matches against Steve Brody and Jimmy Garvin the following week.

He soon began teaming with Pak Song and, only two weeks after Hansen's debut, they captured the NWA Florida Tag Team Championship from Mike Graham & Steve Keirn in Lakeland, Florida on October 14. Although losing to Graham & Keirn after his partner Bobby Duncum was pinned during a tag match in West Palm Beach two days later, he and Pak Song would retain the tag team titles defeating Eddie Graham & Killer Karl Kox in Tampa, Florida on October 17. The following night, he and Pak Song would defend their titles twice in one night defeating Rick Oliver and Prince Tonga in Tampa, Florida and Killer Karl Kox & Steve Keirn in Miami later that night. Breaking his leg during the match, Keirn's injury was written into the storyline as Keirn later claimed he had been attacked by Hansen and other members of Sonny King's stable while training at a local gym with Graham.

Hansen and Pak Song continued their winning streak, continuing to feud with Mike Graham & Killer Karl Kox in tag team and singles matches during the next several weeks. On October 25, they again wrestled to matches in one night defeating Prince Tonga & Sonny Driver at a television taping in Tampa and, later that night, teamed with The Spoiler and Bobby Duncum losing a 6-man tag team match against Jerry Brisco, Jim Garvin and Dusty Rhodes in Miami.

After losing Killer Kox & The Grahams a 6-man tag team elimination match with Pak Song and Sonny King in St. Petersburg three days later, he later interfered in the main event helping NWA Heavyweight Champion Harley Race defeat Dusty Rhodes. Facing Rhodes in a non-sanctioned "Lights Out" match in Tampa on October 31, he nearly defeated Rhodes with outside interference by his manager Sonny King however Killer Kox would also interfere in the match knocking out Hansen and allowing Rhodes to pin Hansen to win the match.

Despite this loss, he and Pak Song would continue defending their titles during October and early-November. On November 7, he and Pak Song would face Killer Karl Kox & Dusty Rhodes, both longtime rivals, later defeating the challengers via disqualification after Killer Kox attempted to hit Hansen with a steel chair.

== Death ==
On November 8, he and Pak Song defeated Jimmy Garvin & Prince Tonga at a television taping in Tampa. Later that night at the Miami Jai-Alai Fronton, he and Pak Song would face Mike Graham & Dusty Rhodes defeating them by disqualification. Following the match, Hansen flew back to the Tampa International Airport and was driving through the Town ‘N Country area when his car stalled on West Hillsborough Boulevard. After telephoning for assistance, Hansen was struck by a car while crossing the median. His head hitting the windshield of the car, he suffered severe brain damage as well as numerous bodily injuries. Taken to St. Joseph's Hospital, Hansen remained in a coma for a week before he died from his injuries on November 16, 1978.

== Championships and accomplishments ==
- Championship Wrestling from Florida

- NWA Florida Tag Team Championship (1 time) - with Pak Song

- National Wrestling Federation

- NWF North American Heavyweight Championship (1 time)
- NWF World Tag Team Championship (1 time) - with Kurt Von Hess

- World Wrestling Council

- WWC Puerto Rico Heavyweight Championship (1 time)
- WWC North American Heavyweight Championship (1 time)

== See also ==
- List of premature professional wrestling deaths
