= NWF North American Heavyweight Championship =

Professional wrestling championship

Details
- Promotion: National Wrestling Federation (NWF); International Wrestling Association (IWA); New Japan Pro-Wrestling (NJPW)
- Date established: 1968
- Date retired: 1977 and 1981

Other names
- NWA North American Heavyweight Championship (Buffalo/Cleveland version); IWA North American Heavyweight Championship
Statistics
- Most reigns: Johnny Powers (12 reigns)
- Longest reign: Tiger Jeet Singh (608 days)
- Shortest reign: Ernie Ladd (24 hours)

The NWF North American Heavyweight Championship was a secondary singles title in the American professional wrestling promotion, the National Wrestling Federation. The title started in 1968 as a National Wrestling Alliance title, named the NWA North American Heavyweight Championship (Buffalo/Cleveland version) until the NWF was founded in 1970. It was then renamed with the NWF name. The NWF would close in 1974, and the title migrated to New Japan Pro-Wrestling. The title was then retired in 1981, after announcement of the IWGP, a new governing body, which would promote their own-branded championships.

== Title history ==
Key
No.	Overall reign number
Reign	Reign number for the specific champion
Days	Number of days held

No.	Champion	Championship change			Reign statistics		Notes	Ref.
No.	Champion	Date	Event	Location	Reign	Days	Notes	Ref.
NWA North American Heavyweight Championship (Buffalo/Cleveland version)
1	Moose Cholak	October 1968 (NLT)	NWF show	N/A	1	(Note: The exact length of this reign is too uncertain to calculate but it lasted at least 101 days.)	Still champion as of December 11, 1968.	
2	Johnny Powers	1968 (NLT)	NWF show	N/A	1	(Note: The date the championship was won and/or lost is uncertain, which means the reign lasted between 1 and 171 days)		
3	Bulldog Brower	1969 (NLT)	NWF show	N/A	1	(Note: The date the championship was won and/or lost is uncertain, which means the reign lasted between 1 and 30 days)		
4	Johnny Powers	May 1969 (NLT)	NWF show	N/A	2	(Note: The date the championship was won and/or lost is uncertain, which means the reign lasted between 1 and 149 days)		
5	Bulldog Brower	January 1, 1970	NWF show	Cleveland, OH	2	(Note: The date the championship was won and/or lost is uncertain, which means the reign lasted between 1 and 150 days)		
6	Johnny Powers	July 1, 1970 (NLT)	NWF show	N/A	3	(Note: The date the championship was won and/or lost is uncertain, which means the reign lasted between 1 and 181 days)		
7	Bulldog Brower	July 2, 1970	NWF show	Cleveland, OH	3	(Note: The date the championship was won and/or lost is uncertain, which means the reign lasted between 1 and 156 days)		
NWF North American Heavyweight Championship
8	Ernie Ladd	December 5, 1970	NWF show	Akron, OH	1	117		
—	Vacated	April 1, 1971	—	Cleveland, OH	—	—	Championship vacated after a match between Ladd and Tex McKenzie	
9	Johnny Powers	April 3, 1971	NWF show	Cleveland, OH	4	5		
10	Ernie Ladd	April 8, 1971	NWF show	Cleveland, OH	2	49		
11	Waldo Von Erich	May 27, 1971	NWF show	Cleveland, OH	1	174		
12	Johnny Powers	November 17, 1971	NWF show	Buffalo, NY	5	289		
13	Johnny Valentine	September 1, 1972	NWF show	Cleveland, OH	1	21		
14	Johnny Powers	September 22, 1972	NWF show	Cleveland, OH	6	0		
—	Vacated	September 22, 1972	—	—	—	—	Championship vacated pending a review of the match.	
15	Johnny Valentine	October 1972 (NLT)	NWF show	N/A	2	(Note: The date the championship was won and/or lost is uncertain, which means the reign lasted between 22 and 52 days)	Won the rematch.	
16	Ernie Ladd	November 22, 1972	NWF show	Buffalo, NY	3	1		
17	Johnny Powers	November 23, 1972	NWF show	Cleveland, OH	7	72		
18	Karl Von Krupp	February 3, 1973	NWF show	Akron, OH	1	14		
19	Johnny Powers	February 17, 1973	NWF show	Akron, OH	8	77		
20	Eric the Animal	May 5, 1973	NWF show	Cleveland, OH	1	11		
21	Johnny Powers	May 16, 1973	NWF show	Buffalo, NY	9	31		
22	J.B. Psycho	June 16, 1973	NWF show	Buffalo, NY	1	8		
23	Johnny Powers	June 24, 1973	NWF show	Akron, OH	10	221		
24	Ernie Ladd	January 31, 1974	NWF show	Cleveland, OH	4	(Note: The date the championship was won and/or lost is uncertain, which means the reign lasted between 1 and 41 days)		
25	Ox Baker	March 1974 (NLT)	NWF show	N/A	1	(Note: The date the championship was won and/or lost is uncertain, which means the reign lasted between 1 and 13 days)		
26	Ernie Ladd	March 14, 1974	NWF show	Cleveland, OH	5	4		
27	Johnny Powers	March 18, 1974	NWF show	Akron, OH	11	(Note: The date the championship was won and/or lost is uncertain, which means the reign lasted between 1 and 43 days)		
Super Pro-Wrestling North American Heavyweight Title
28	Dominic DeNucci	April 1974 (NLT)	NWF show	N/A	1	(Note: The date the championship was won and/or lost is uncertain, which means the reign lasted between 31 and 74 days)		
29	George Steele	May 31, 1974	NWF show	Pittsburgh, PA	1	(Note: The date the championship was won and/or lost is uncertain, which means the reign lasted between 1 and 21 days)		
30	Dominic Denucci	June 21, 1974 (NLT)	NWF show	N/A	2	(Note: The date the championship was won and/or lost is uncertain, which means the reign lasted between 1 and 56 days)		
31	Stan Stasiak	July 27, 1974 (NLT)	NWF show	N/A	1	(Note: The date the championship was won and/or lost is uncertain, which means the reign lasted between 24 and 59 days)	Sometime between July 5, 1974 and July 27, 1974.	
32	Ox Baker	August 20, 1974	NWF show	N/A	2	7		
33	Ernie Ladd	August 27, 1974	NWF show	N/A	6	62		
IWA North American Heavyweight Championship
34	Tarzan Tyler	October 28, 1974	NWF show	N/A	1	70	In January 1975 billed as champion upon promotion startup.	
35	Ox Baker	January 6, 1975	NWF show	Savannah, GA	3	(Note: The exact date the championship was won and/or lost is uncertain, which means that the reign lasted between 115 and 145 days.)		
—	Vacated	May 1975	—	—	—	—	Championship vacated when Baker left the promotion.	
36	Bulldog Brower	July 1975	NWF show	N/A	4	(Note: The date the championship was won and/or lost is uncertain, which means the reign lasted between 1 and 208 days)	Awarded, or possibly by defeating Mighty Igor or Johnny Powers after Baker leaves the promotion; still champion as of August 1977.	
NWF North American Heavyweight Championship
37	Johnny Powers	January 1979 (NLT)	NWF show	N/A	12	(Note: The date the championship was won and/or lost is uncertain, which means the reign lasted between 1 and 208 days)	Billed as champion for a tour of Japan.	
38	Seiji Sakaguchi	January 26, 1979	NWF show	Okayama, Japan	1	238		
39	Tiger Jeet Singh	September 21, 1979	NWF show	Sendai, Japan	1	608		
—	Deactivated	April 23, 1981	—	—	—	—	The championship retired after announcement of the IWGP.	

== See also ==
- National Wrestling Alliance
- National Wrestling Federation
- New Japan Pro-Wrestling
