= NWF World Tag Team Championship =

Professional wrestling tag team championship

Details
- Promotion: National Wrestling Federation; International Wrestling Association
- Date established: 1970
- Date retired: 1974 and 1977

Other name
- IWA World Tag Team Championship
Statistics
- Most reigns: Team: Don Fargo and Johnny Fargo (4 reigns); Individual: Johnny Powers (5 reigns)
- Longest reign: The Outlaws (Dick Murdoch and Dusty Rhodes) (170 days)
- Shortest reign: Hartford Love and Dizzy McShane (9 days)

The NWF World Tag Team Championship was the top tag team championship in the National Wrestling Federation from 1970 to 1974, the entire life of the promotion.

== Title history ==
Key
No.	Overall reign number
Reign	Reign number for the specific team—reign numbers for the individuals are in parentheses, if different
Days	Number of days held

No.	Champion	Championship change			Reign statistics		Notes	Ref.
No.	Champion	Date	Event	Location	Reign	Days	Notes	Ref.
NWF World Tag Team Championship
1	The Outlaws (Dick Murdoch and Dusty Rhodes)	March 12, 1970	NWF show	Cleveland, Ohio	1	170	Defeated Ben Justice and The Stomper in a tournament final.	
2	Johnny Powers and Chief White Owl	August 29, 1970	NWF show	Akron, Ohio	1	(Note: The date the championship was won and lost are uncertain, which means that the championship reign lasted between 1 and 131 days.)		
Championship history is unrecorded from August 29, 1970 to January 7, 1971.
3	The Fabulous Fargos (Don and Johnny)	January 7, 1971	NWF show	Cleveland, Ohio	1	(Note: The date the championship was won and lost are uncertain, which means that the championship reign lasted between 1 and 174 days.)	Defeated Chief White Owl and Luis Martinez.	
4	The Mongols (Bepo and Geeto)	June 1971 (NLT)	NWF show	N/A	1	(Note: The date the championship was won and lost are uncertain, which means that the championship reign lasted between 22 and 195 days.)		
5	Kurt von Hess and Eric the Red	July 22, 1971	NWF show	Cleveland, Ohio	1	(Note: The date the championship was won and lost are uncertain, which means that the championship reign lasted between 1 and 39 days.)	Won a tournament.	
6	Chief White Owl (2) and Luis Martinez	August 1971 (NLT)	NWF show	N/A	1	(Note: The date the championship was won and lost are uncertain, which means that the championship reign lasted between 1 and 181 days.)		
Championship history is unrecorded from August 1971 (NLT) to January 19, 1972.
7	Mitsu Arakawa and Yoshino Sato	January 19, 1972	NWF show	Buffalo, New York	1	(Note: The exact date the championship was lost is uncertain, which means that the championship reign lasted between 1 and −294 days.)	Defeated Dominic DeNucci and Tony Parisi in a tournament final.	
8	Dominic DeNucci and Tony Parisi	March 1972 (NLT)	NWF show	N/A	1	(Note: The exact date that the championship was won is uncertain, which means that the championship reign lasted between 31 and 71 days.)		
9	The Fabulous Fargos (Don and Johnny)	May 11, 1972	NWF show	Cleveland, Ohio	2	(Note: The exact date the championship was lost is uncertain, which means that the championship reign lasted between 1 and 11 days.)		
10	Dominic DeNucci and Tony Parisi	May 1972 (NLT)	NWF show	N/A	2	(Note: The exact date the championship was won is uncertain, which means that the championship reign lasted between 1 and 29 days.)		
11	The Fabulous Fargos (Don and Johnny)	May 24, 1972	NWF show	Buffalo, New York	3	(Note: The exact date the championship was lost is unknown, which means that the championship reign lasted between 69 and 98 days.)		
12	Wahoo McDaniel and Chief White Owl (3)	August 1972 (NLT)	NWF show	Cleveland, Ohio	1	(Note: The exact date the championship was won and lost is uncertain, which means that the championship reign lasted between 1 and 114 days.)	Sometime after August 14, 1972.	
Championship history is unrecorded from August 1972 (NLT) to September 15, 1972 (NLT).
13	The Fabulous Fargos (Don and Johnny)	September 15, 1972 (NLT)	NWF show	N/A	4	(Note: The exact date the championship was won and lost is uncertain, which means that the championship reign lasted between 48 and 152 days.)	Still champion on November 2, 1972.	
Championship history is unrecorded from September 15, 1972 (NLT) to December 1972 (NLT).
14	Luis Martinez (2) and Tony Parisi (3)	December 1972 (NLT)	NWF show	Cincinnati, Ohio	1	(Note: The exact date the championship was won and lost is uncertain, which means that the championship reign lasted between 1 and 228 days.)		
Championship history is unrecorded from December 1972 (NLT) to May 2, 1973.
15	Johnny Powers (2) and Jacques Rougeau	May 2, 1973	NWF show	Buffalo, New York	1	(Note: The exact date the championship was won and lost is uncertain, which means that the championship reign lasted between 1 and 28 days.)	Defeated The Love Brothers (Hartford and Reginald Love) in a tournament final.	
Championship history is unrecorded from May 2, 1973 to May 1973 (NLT).
16	Geeto Mongol (2) and J.B. Psycho	May 1973 (NLT)	NWF show	N/A	1	(Note: The exact date the championship was won and lost is uncertain, which means that the championship reign lasted between 1 and 59 days.)		
Championship history is unrecorded from May 1973 (NLT) to June 30, 1973 (NLT).
17	Fred Curry and Luis Martinez (3)	June 30, 1973 (NLT)	NWF show	N/A	1	(Note: The exact date the championship was won and lost is uncertain, which means that the championship reign lasted between 1 and 60 days.)		
18	Kurt Von Hess (2) and Karl Von Schotz	May 1974 (NLT)	NWF show	N/A	1	(Note: The exact date the championship was won and lost is uncertain, which means that the championship reign lasted between 1 and 335 days.)	Also held NWA North American Tag Team Championship (Los Angeles/Japan version).	
—	Vacated	1974	—	—	—	—	Championship abandoned when the NWF closed	
{{{name}}}
19	The Mongols (Geeto (3) and Bolo)	February 1975	NWF show	N/A	1	(Note: The exact date the championship was won and lost is uncertain, which means that the championship reign lasted between 32 and 88 days.)		
—	Vacated	April 1975	—	—	—	—	Championship vacated after a match against Dino Bravo and Gino Brito in April 1975.	
20	The Mongols (Geeto (4) and Bolo)	April 21, 1975	NWF show	Winston-Salem, North Carolina	2	155	Defeated Soul Patrol (Thunderbolt Patterson and Ernie Ladd)	
	vacated	September 23, 1975	N/A	N/A			Championship vacated up after a match against held up after a match against Victor Rivera and Dino Bravo on September 23, 1975 ends with a double pinfall. Mongols billed champions on September 25, 1975; still champions as of October 13, 1975.	
Championship history is unrecorded from September 23, 1975 to December 16, 1975.
21	Johnny Powers (3) and Nelson Royal	December 16, 1975	NWF show	N/A	1	(Note: The exact date the championship was won is uncertain, which means that the reign lasted between 1 and 94 days.)	No longer listed as champions in February 1976.	
22	Kurt Von Hess (3) and Karl von Stroheim	March 19, 1976 (NLT)	NWF show	N/A	1	(Note: The exact date the championship was won is uncertain, which means that the reign lasted between 145 and 238 days.)	Sometime after January 21, 1976, possibly a phantom switch or defeat Pez Whatley and Bruiser Banks for the vacant title.	
23	Bulldog Brower and Mighty Igor	August 11, 1976	NWF show	Hickory, North Carolina	1	(Note: The exact date the championship was won is uncertain, which means that the reign lasted between 1 and 30 days.)		
24	Hartford Love and Dizzy McShane	September 10, 1976 (NLT)	NWF show	N/A	1	(Note: The exact date the championship was won is uncertain, which means that the reign lasted between 1 and 30 days.)	Sometime after August 29, 1976.	
25	Bulldog Brower (2) and Johnny Powers (4)	September 19, 1976	NWF show	N/A	1	125		
26	Rip Tyler and Buzz Tyler	January 22, 1977	NWF show	Gastonia, North Carolina	1	91		
27	Johnny Powers (5) and Nick DeCarlo	April 23, 1977	NWF show	Gastonia, North Carolina	1	(Note: The exact date that the championship was abandoned is unknown, which means that the reign lasted between 34 and 252 days.)		
—	Deactivated	1977	—	—	—	—	Promotion closed, championship abandoned	
