= Johnny Valentine =

American professional wrestler (1928–2001)

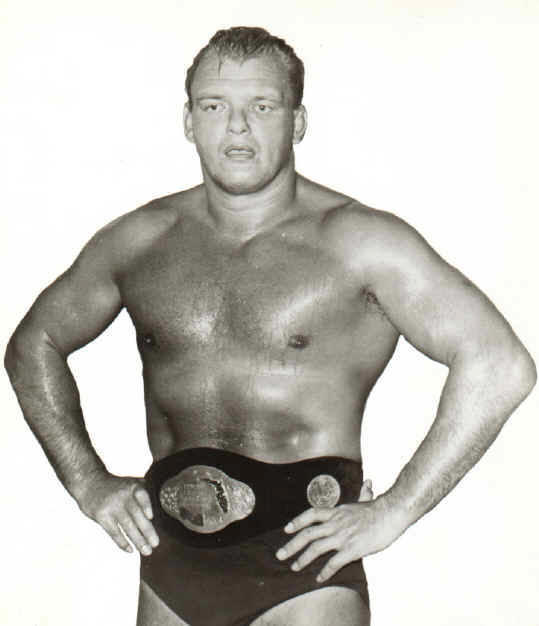
- Valentine as NWA Florida Heavyweight Champion in 1970

Personal information
- Born: John Theodore Wisniski; September 22, 1928 Maple Valley, Washington, U.S.
- Died: April 24, 2001 (aged 72) River Oaks, Texas, U.S.
- Children: Greg Valentine

Professional wrestling career
- Ring name(s): The Big O Johnny Valentine
- Billed height: 6 ft 4 in (193 cm)
- Billed weight: 255 lb (116 kg)
- Trained by: Stanislaus Zbyszko; Wladek Zbyszko
- Debut: 1947
- Retired: October 1975

John Theodore Wisniski (September 22, 1928 – April 24, 2001), better known by his ring name Johnny Valentine, was an American professional wrestler with a career spanning almost three decades. He has been inducted into four halls of fame for his achievements in wrestling. Wisniski is the father of professional wrestler Greg "The Hammer" Valentine.

He held numerous regional titles, including the NWA United States Heavyweight Championship. He had long running rivalries with Bobo Brazil, Pat O'Connor, Buddy Rogers, Antonino Rocca, Lou Thesz, Harley Race, The Sheik, Wahoo McDaniel, Fritz von Erich, Bruno Sammartino, Johnny Powers, Antonio Inoki, Jack Brisco, and Jerry Brisco. He alternated between being a villain and a hero (babyface) during the Golden Era in the 1940s through 1960s of wrestling.

In 1975, he was injured in a plane crash; he suffered a broken back and was forced to retire from wrestling. He worked briefly as a manager before retiring altogether. He suffered from several health problems during his retirement, which worsened considerably after a fall in 2000. He died the following year.

== Professional wrestling career ==
Valentine debuted as a professional wrestler in 1947, wrestling Karl Nowena in Buenos Aires. In order to make the matches as believable as possible, Valentine insisted the men he faced in the ring hit him as hard as possible. From that he earned a strong reputation as being a very tough man. On January 1, 1950, Buddy Rogers defeated Valentine in the finals of a United States title tournament. He also competed in the NWA's Capitol Wrestling territory. Jerry Graham, who was a co-holder of the Northeast version of the NWA United States Tag Team Championship, selected Valentine in November 1959 to take over the title from Graham's injured partner. They were beaten for the title belts the following April, but Valentine took on a new partner, Buddy Rogers, to regain the championship by defeating The Fabulous Kangaroos on November 19, 1960. Wisniski's rivalry with the Kangaroos continued, as the Kangaroos regained the belts in a rematch one week later. Valentine went over one year without holding a championship before teaming with a new partner, this time Bob Ellis, to defeat the Kangaroos and take back the championship. Valentine and Ellis lost the belts to Buddy Rogers & Johnny Barend in a match where Arnold Skaaland subbed for Ellis, but the belts were still up, on Washington, DC TV. Rogers and Barend then defeated the real team of Valentine & Ellis 2 pins to 1 in a main event at Madison Square Garden.

In Toronto, Valentine and three different partners won the International Tag Team title during 1963. Valentine left the territory without dropping the title. He wrestled in Japan in the mid-1960s and had a series of matches against Antonio Inoki. Those matches are regarded as the bouts that helped build Inoki into an elite wrestler in Japan, as Valentine was the highest-profile foreign wrestler Inoki had ever faced at the time. Valentine put over Inoki in the matches, dropping the Toronto version of the NWA United States Heavyweight Championship to him catapulting Inoki's career in the process. Valentine also continued to wrestle in the former Capitol Wrestling territory, which had since been renamed the World Wide Wrestling Federation. While there, he had one last reign with what was then known as the WWWF United States Tag Team Championship, as he teamed with Tony Parisi to hold the belts for seven months in 1966. Valentine later turned on Parisi, however. This ignited a brief feud with Bruno Sammartino, who was billed as Parisi's cousin. Because Valentine was also wrestling in Texas at the same time, he got only sporadic main event matches against Sammartino during this feud.

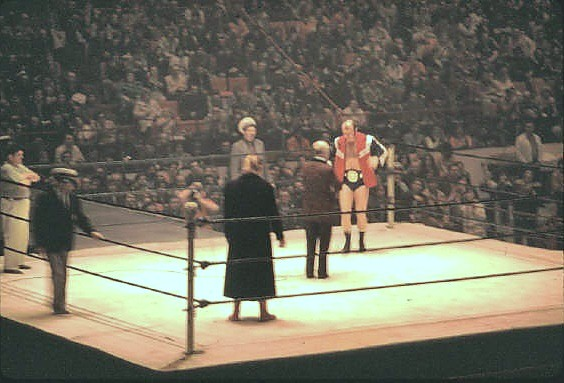
Valentine vs. Dory Funk Jr. in 1973

Valentine then moved on to the Florida territory, where he won the NWA Florida Heavyweight Championship three times. In Georgia, he defeated Tim Woods for the NWA Georgia Heavyweight title, on May 10, 1968, and repeated his win in a match against Doug Gilbert to retake the title. In Missouri, Valentine competed for the Missouri Heavyweight Championship in a tournament to determine the inaugural champion. He defeated Baron von Raschke before withdrawing from the tournament due to focus his efforts on the NWA World Heavyweight Championship. After Harley Race won the tournament and the title belt, Valentine defeated him to win the championship on January 19, 1973. He dropped the belt to Terry Funk the following month. Because Funk used a chair as a weapon in front of the referee, fans demanded a rematch. Valentine was unable to compete due to heart problems, however, so Gene Kiniski took his place and won the belt from Funk. In October 1972, Valentine defeated Jacques Rougeau for the International Heavyweight Championship, but was stripped of the title in January 1973, after he no-showed the rematch.

In the National Wrestling Federation, Valentine defeated Johnny Powers for the NWF North American Heavyweight Championship on September 1, 1972. Powers beat Valentine for the title in October, but Valentine won the title again from Abdullah the Butcher on October 19. He was stripped of the title following a match with Johnny Powers. On November 23, he captured the title from Powers, but lost it again in January. In the Japan Wrestling Association, Valentine won the International Tag Team title on February 22, 1973, and then the NWA United National Championship on March 2. He lost the Tag title on March 6, and the United National title on March 8. Back in the National Wrestling Federation, in August 1973, Valentine beat Jacques Rougeau, Sr. to win the North American Heavyweight Championship. He lost it to Johnny Powers in late 1973.

In Mid-Atlantic Championship Wrestling, Valentine was awarded the Mid Atlantic Heavyweight Championship in January 1974, after Jerry Brisco left to work in Japan. Valentine lost the title to Wahoo McDaniel shortly before winning the United States Heavyweight Championship from Harley Race in Greensboro, North Carolina on July 4, 1975. Valentine held that title at the time he was paralyzed in a plane crash. His last match was a defense against McDaniel on September 28 in Greensboro.

After his paralysis, he remained active in professional wrestling as a manager in Paul Boesch's Texas-based promotion. Valentine managed Dale Hey, who competed as Dale Valentine in a storyline that saw the two promoted as brothers. The storyline did not last long, however.

== Personal life ==
Valentine was originally from Maple Valley, Washington. He is said to have come from a dysfunctional family. He was a devout Christian for many years. He was married in the early 1950s and the marriage lasted 20 years until they divorced. He was later married to a woman named Sharon, who worked across the street from his apartment in the mid 1970s when they met. She later visited John as he was recovering in hospital from his 1975 plane crash. Sometime later, the relationship ended as he didn't want her to see him in his condition. Years later, while on braces and crutches, he managed to drive around her neighbourhood for hours until he found her house. As he slowly walked to the front door, Sharon's daughter announced to Sharon that Johnny Valentine was in front of their home. Sharon, having been ill, refused to go to the door and hid. Valentine insisted he wouldn't leave until he saw her. When she finally came to the door, he asked her to marry him and she accepted. Following John's death, Sharon planned to write a book titled A Never Ending Love Story of a Wrestler and His Wife about their life together. He also had a son from a long-ago previous relationship, Greg Valentine, who has wrestled professionally since 1970 and is best known as Greg "The Hammer" Valentine. Ric Flair, who wrestled with Wisniski, has described him as a quiet person who kept to himself. He was also known for making his demands clear to employers and not backing down, and many stories continue to circulate about practical jokes, or ribs, that he played on his fellow wrestlers.

On October 4, 1975, Valentine was in a private airplane (a twin-engined Cessna 310) with Ric Flair, David Crockett, Bob Bruggers, and Tim Woods. Because of the weight of the passengers, the pilot realized that he could not take off without reducing the amount of fuel the plane was carrying. Part way through the flight, the aircraft ran out of fuel and crashed near Wilmington, North Carolina. The crash broke Flair's back, Bob Bruggers, Wisniski, and pilot Michael Farkus also broke their backs. A bone fragment became embedded in his spinal column, paralyzing him for life and forcing him to have a clamp implanted to hold the bones in his back together. Farkus died a year later having never awakened from a coma. Crockett and Woods suffered less serious injury.

In August 2000, Valentine fell from his front porch, and had a number of injuries and complications. These included a fractured back, pneumonia, staph infection, collapsed lungs and kidney failure. Due to his many injuries he slipped into a coma. At one point he came out of it while his wife was singing to him. He began singing himself but fell back into the coma. His wife had purchased medical insurance through a health maintenance organization (HMO), but the organization was unwilling to pay for Wisniski's extended stay in the hospital. As a result, Lou Thesz's wife convinced the Cauliflower Alley Club to help contribute to Wisniski's medical bills. Those medical bills reached close to a million dollars.

Valentine has been recognized for his wrestling career by several sources. Shortly after his death, he was named the 2001 recipient of Pro Wrestling Illustrated's Stanley Weston Award, a recognition given for lifetime achievement in professional wrestling. He has also been inducted into several halls of fame. He was a member of the inaugural class of inductees to the Wrestling Observer Newsletter Hall of Fame in 1996. He is also a member of the Stampede Wrestling Hall of Fame. In 2006, he was inducted into the Professional Wrestling Hall of Fame, and he joined the St. Louis Wrestling Hall of Fame the following year.

Valentine died peacefully in River Oaks, Texas on April 24, 2001. He was 72. His wife Sharon kept his ashes in her bedroom. She died in 2013.

== Championships and accomplishments ==
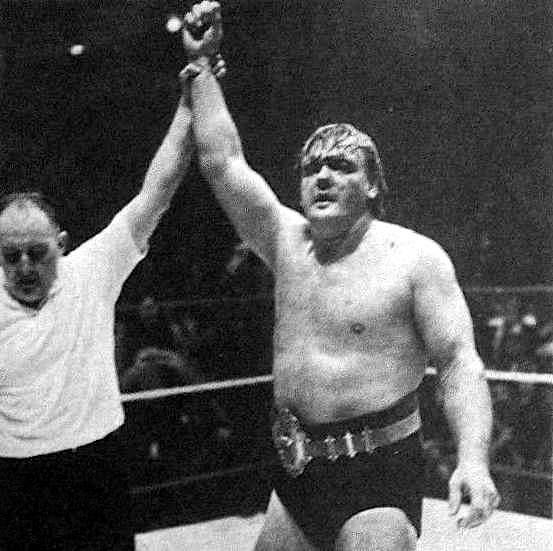
Valentine as Mid-Atlantic Heavyweight Champion in 1975

- 50th State Big Time Wrestling
  - NWA Hawaii Tag Team Championship (1 time) – with Ripper Collins
- All Japan Pro Wrestling
  - NWA International Tag Team Championship (Japan version) (1 time) – with Killer Karl Krupp
  - NWA United National Championship (1 time)
- Big Time Wrestling (Boston)
  - BTW United States Heavyweight Championship (1 time)
- Big Time Wrestling (Detroit)
  - NWA United States Heavyweight Championship (Detroit version) (3 times)
- Capitol Wrestling Corporation / World Wide Wrestling Federation
  - NWA United States Television Championship (5 times, inaugural)
  - NWA United States Tag Team Championship (Northeast version) (3 times) – with Buddy Rogers (1), “Cowboy” Bob Ellis (1), and Dr. Jerry Graham (1)
  - WWWF United States Tag Team Championship (1 time) – with Tony Parisi
- Championship Wrestling from Florida
  - NWA Brass Knuckles Championship (Florida version) (1 time)
  - NWA Florida Heavyweight Championship (4 times)
  - NWA Southern Heavyweight Championship (Florida version) (1 time)
  - NWA Southern Tag Team Championship (Florida version) (1 time) – with Boris Malenko
- L&G Promotions
  - L&G Caribbean Heavyweight Championship (1 time)
- IHW Entertainment
  - Hall of Fame (Class of 2010)
- International Wrestling Association (Chicago)
  - IWA International Heavyweight Championship (Chicago version) (1 time)
- International Wrestling Association (Montreal)
  - IWA International Heavyweight Championship (Montreal version) (1 time)
- Maple Leaf Wrestling
  - NWA International Tag Team Championship (Toronto version) (5 times) – with Bulldog Brower (1), The Beast (1), Jim Hady (1), and Whipper Billy Watson (2)
  - NWA United States Heavyweight Championship (Toronto version) (7 times)
- Mid-Atlantic Championship Wrestling
  - NWA Mid-Atlantic Heavyweight Championship (2 times)
  - NWA United States Heavyweight Championship (Mid-Atlantic version) (1 time)
- Mid-South Sports
  - NWA Georgia Heavyweight Championship (2 times)
- Minneapolis Wrestling and Boxing Club
  - NWA World Tag Team Championship (Minneapolis version) (1 time) – with Chet Wallick
- National Wrestling Alliance
  - NWA Hall of Fame (Class of 2011)
- NWA Los Angeles
  - NWA "Beat the Champ" Television Championship (2 times)
- National Wrestling Federation
  - NWF Heavyweight Championship (2 times)
  - NWF North American Heavyweight Championship (2 times)
- Pro Wrestling Illustrated
  - PWI Most Inspirational Wrestler of the Year (1973)
  - PWI Stanley Weston Award (awarded posthumously) in 2001
- Professional Wrestling Hall of Fame
  - Class of 2006
- Southwest Sports, Inc. / NWA Big Time Wrestling
  - NWA Brass Knuckles Championship (Texas version) (5 times)
  - NWA American Heavyweight Championship (1 time)
  - NWA American Tag Team Championship (3 times) – with Wahoo McDaniel (2) and Thunderbolt Patterson (1)
  - NWA Texas Heavyweight Championship (9 times)
  - NWA Texas Tag Team Championship (1 time) – with Eddie Graham
  - NWA United States Heavyweight Championship (Texas version) (1 time)^{1}
- St. Louis Wrestling Club
  - NWA Missouri Heavyweight Championship (1 time)
- St. Louis Wrestling Hall of Fame
  - Class of 2007
- Stampede Wrestling
  - NWA Canadian Heavyweight Championship (Calgary version) (2 times)
  - Stampede Wrestling Hall of Fame (Class of 1995)
- Western States Sports
  - NWA North American Heavyweight Championship (Amarillo version) (1 time)
- Wrestling Observer Newsletter
  - Wrestling Observer Newsletter Hall of Fame (Class of 1996)

^{1}This championship would be renamed the NWA American Heavyweight Championship in May 1968. It would go on to be renamed the WCWA World Heavyweight Championship after World Class' withdrawal from the NWA in February 1986.
