= Bulldog Brower =

American professional wrestler

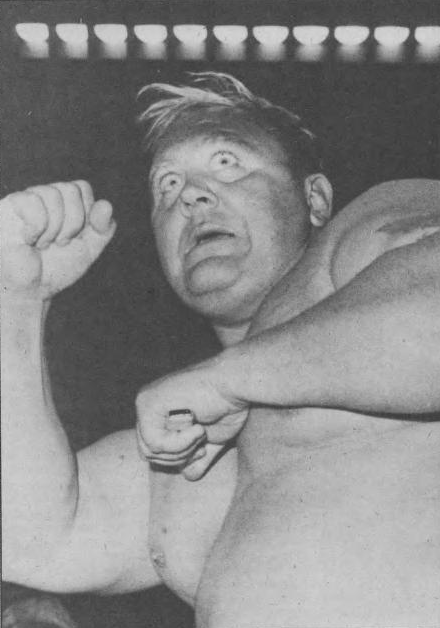
- Gland, circa 1979

Personal information
- Born: Richard T. Gland; September 17, 1933 Delaware, U.S.
- Died: September 15, 1997 (aged 63) Newark, Delaware
- Spouse: Susan Gland (his death)
- Children: 3

Professional wrestling career
- Ring name(s): Bulldog Brower; Delaware Destroyer; Dick Brower; The Gestapo
- Billed height: 5 ft 8 in (1.73 m)
- Billed weight: 270 lb (120 kg; 19 st)
- Debut: 1958
- Retired: 1988

Richard T. Gland (September 17, 1933 – September 15, 1997), better known by his ring name Dick "Bulldog" Brower, was an American professional wrestler.

== Early life ==
Gland served in the U.S. Marines and frequently visited his local YMCA. He got into powerlifting after graduating from Wilmington High School in 1952. However, Gland dropped out of chiropractic school to pursue a career as a professional wrestler.

== Professional wrestling career ==
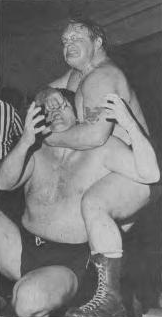
Gland (top) pulls on Johnny Powers's face (bottom), circa 1979

Gland started his career in the Delaware territory in 1958 under the ring name the Delaware Destroyer, however, other sources state that his debut was in 1960. Brower, at one point, wrestled Terrible Ted and hit Haystacks Calhoun with a body slam. In 1961, Brower traveled to Canada to wrestle for Stu Hart in his promotion Stampede Wrestling. Hart claimed that Brower wrestled Whipper Billy Watson over 500 times. After his run in Stampede, Brower wrestled for Frank Tunney in Toronto from 1961 to 1974. There, Brower won the NWA International Tag Team Championship five times, including with Sweet Daddy Siki in 1962, and Johnny Valentine in February 1963. He also worked for other promotions including the American Wrestling Association, NWA St. Louis, Big Time Wrestling in Detroit, and All-Star Wrestling in Montreal.

In 1966, Brower got a call from Vincent J. McMahon to be a heel in the World Wide Wrestling Federation. He enjoyed a lengthy feud with WWWF Heavyweight Champion Bruno Sammartino, whom he main evented shows with over the next few years. He also feuded with Pedro Morales and Bob Backlund, who, in his book Backlund: From All-American Boy to Professional Wrestling's World Champion, described Brower as the least favorite man he ever had to wrestle for the championship.

Brower also wrestled for the National Wrestling Federation (NWF), where he won the NWF North American Heavyweight Championship in 1970. He went on to wrestle for World Championship Wrestling in Australia, where he won the NWA Austra-Asian Heavyweight Championship in 1972, as well as the short-lived International Wrestling Association in the New York City area.

Brower returned to the World Wide Wrestling Federation from 1979 to 1982, where he was managed by Lou Albano. He then traveled to Puerto Rico, where he competed for the World Wrestling Council (WWC). He and Luke Graham won their version of the NWA North American Tag Team Championship, before Brower retired from professional wrestling in 1988.

== Death ==
While with his son Richie, Gland fell and broke a hip, and was later found to have an infection in his chest. After living with diabetes and going into a coma, Gland died on September 15, 1997, at the age of 63. At the time of his death, Gland was divorced from Susan and had two daughters and a son, as well as four grandchildren.

== Championships and accomplishments ==
- International Wrestling Association
  - IWA North American Heavyweight Championship (1 time)
  - IWA Tag Team Championship (2 times) – with Mighty Igor (1) and Johnny Powers (1)
- Maple Leaf Wrestling
  - NWA International Tag Team Championship (Toronto version) (5 times) – with Sweet Daddy Siki (1), Johnny Valentine (1), Dr. Jerry Graham (1), and Whipper Billy Watson (2)
- National Wrestling Federation
  - NWF North American Heavyweight Championship (3 times)
  - NWF World Tag Team Championship (2 times) - with Mighty Igor (1) and Johnny Powers (1)
- World Class Championship Wrestling
  - NWA American Tag Team Championship (1 time) – with Roddy Piper
- World Championship Wrestling (Australia)
  - NWA Austra-Asian Heavyweight Championship (1 time)
  - World Brass Knuckles Championship
- World Wrestling Council
  - NWA North American Tag Team Championship (Puerto Rico/WWC version) (1 time) – with Luke Graham
