= Joe Turco =

American professional wrestler

Personal information
- Born: Joseph Bandiera Catania, Sicily, Italy

Professional wrestling career
- Ring name(s): Baron Turco; Bull Turco; The Great Matador; Joe Bano; Joe Turco; Magnificent Matador; Mario Leone; The Matador
- Billed weight: 246 lb (112 kg)
- Debut: 1956
- Retired: 1978

Joseph Bandiera was an Italian professional wrestler, best known for his appearances with the World Wide Wrestling Federation in the 1970s as Joe Turco.

== Professional wrestling career ==
Bandiera made his professional wrestling debut in 1956 in Southern California as "The Great Matador". In 1960, he journeyed to Arizona, New Mexico, and Texas. Throughout the decade, he worked in Tennessee, Minnesota, Alabama, the Mid-Atlantic, and Georgia.

In 1970, Bandiera made his debut for the World Wide Wrestling Federation as "Joe Turco", nicknamed "the Continental Nobleman". In 1971, he left the WWWF and worked in Japan for Japan Wrestling Association. Also in 1971-1972 he worked for American Wrestling Association and returned to Georgia and the Mid-Atlantic.

In 1972, Bandiera returned to the WWWF. Also, during the decade, he worked for International Wrestling Association in Cleveland and the Central States. In 1977, he returned to Japan, this time working for International Wrestling Enterprise.

In 1978, Bandiera wrestled his last matches for WWWF. He retired later that year.

== Championships and accomplishments ==
- International Wrestling Enterprises
  - Texas Battle Royal Championship (1 time)
- NWA New Mexico
  - International City Tag Team Championship (1 time) - with Tony Barbetta
