= WWC North American Heavyweight Championship =

WWC North America Heavyweight Championship

Details
- Promotion: World Wrestling Council; Americas Wrestling Federation; International Wrestling Association (Puerto Rico)
- Date established: April 5, 1974
- Date retired: February 26, 1994

Other names
- NWA/WWC North America Heavyweight Championship (1974–1989, 1991, 1992-1993); AWF North America Heavyweight Championship (1992); IWA North America Heavyweight Championship (1994)
Statistics
- First champion: Gil Hayes
- Final champion: Ricky Santana
- Most reigns: Carlos Colón (9 reigns)
- Longest reign: Abdullah the Butcher (441 days)
- Shortest reign: Invader I (1 day)
- Oldest champion: Abdullah the Butcher (52 years, 30 days)
- Youngest champion: Buddy Landell (20 years, 200 days)
- Heaviest champion: Abdullah the Butcher (430 lb (200 kg; 31 st))

The WWC North America Heavyweight Championship was a professional wrestling championship defended in the Puerto Rican promotion, the World Wrestling Council. Created in 1974, it was the primary singles championship of the promotion until the creation of the WWC Universal Heavyweight Championship in 1982. It was then relegated to secondary status until it was abandoned sometime in late 1994.

== Title history ==
Wrestler:	Times:	Date:	Days	Location:	Notes:
WWC North America Heavyweight Championship
Gil Hayes	1	April 5, 1974	78	San German, Puerto Rico	Won a tournament final.
Carlos Colón	1	June 22, 1974	121	Caguas, Puerto Rico	
Ernie Ladd	1	October 21, 1974	33	San Juan, Puerto Rico	
Held up on November 23, 1974 after a match between Carlos Colón and Ernie Ladd in Caguas, Puerto Rico
Carlos Colón	2	December 7, 1974	84	Caguas, Puerto Rico	Defeated Ladd in a rematch to win the held up title.
Pierre Martel	1	March 1, 1975	21	Bayamón, Puerto Rico	
Carlos Colón	3	March 22, 1975	156	Bayamón, Puerto Rico	
Spoiler I	1	August 25, 1975	26	San Juan, Puerto Rico	
Carlos Colón	4	September 20, 1975	154	Caguas, Puerto Rico	
“Cowboy” Bob Ellis	1	February 21, 1976	56	Bayamón, Puerto Rico	
Carlos Colón	5	April 17, 1976	182	Caguas, Puerto Rico	
Eric the Red	1	October 16, 1976	28	Bayamón, Puerto Rico	
Held up After a match between Eric The Red and Carlos Colón on November 13, 1976 in Bayamon, Puerto Rico
Carlos Colón	6	November 27, 1976	149	Caguas, Puerto Rico	Defeated Eric the Red in a rematch to win the held up title.
Hartford Love	1	April 25, 1977	96	San Juan, Puerto Rico	
Gorilla Monsoon	1	July 30, 1977	279	San Juan, Puerto Rico	
Bruno Sammartino	1	May 5, 1978	78	San Juan, Puerto Rico	
Gorilla Monsoon	2	July 22, 1978	224	San Juan, Puerto Rico	
Carlos Colón	7	March 3, 1979	153	Bayamón, Puerto Rico	
Don Kent	1	August 3, 1979	27	Ponce, Puerto Rico	
Invader I	1	August 30, 1979	60	Ponce, Puerto Rico	
Roger Kirby	1	October 29, 1979	19	San Juan, Puerto Rico	
Invader I	2	November 17, 1979	70	Bayamón, Puerto Rico	
Mr. Fuji	1	January 26, 1980	175	Bayamón, Puerto Rico	
Pierre Martel	2	July 19, 1980	238	Caguas, Puerto Rico	
Killer Karl Krupp	1	March 14, 1981	49	Bayamón, Puerto Rico	
Held up on May 2, 1981 after a match between Killer Karl Krupp and Carlos Colón in San Juan, Puerto Rico.
Carlos Colón	8	May 9, 1981	93	Bayamón, Puerto Rico	Defeat Killer Karl Krupp in a rematch to win the held up title.
Abdullah the Butcher	1	August 10, 1981	33	San Juan, Puerto Rico	Defeat Carlos Colón for the WWC North América and WWC Puerto Rico Heavyweight Titles.
Carlos Colón	9	September 12, 1981	166	Bayamón, Puerto Rico	Defeat Abdullah The Butcher for the WWC North América and WWC Puerto Rico Heavyweight Titles.
Bobby Jaggers	1	February 25, 1982	30	San Germán, Puerto Rico	Defeat Carlos Colón for the WWC North America Heavyweight Championship only.
Invader I	3	March 27, 1982	251	Bayamón, Puerto Rico	Defeat Dory Funk, Jr. in a texas death match for the WWC North American and WWC Puerto Rico Heavyweight titles on October 16, 1982 in San Juan, Puerto Rico.
Mad Dog Lafaib	1	December 3, 1982	57	Ponce, Puerto Rico	
Pierre Martel	3	January 29, 1983	35	San Juan, Puerto Rico	
Buddy Landel	1	March 5, 1983	112	Bayamón, Puerto Rico	
Pedro Morales	1	June 25, 1983	195	Guaynabo, Puerto Rico	
Sweet Daddy Siki	1	January 6, 1984	77	Bayamón, Puerto Rico	
Pedro Morales	2	March 23, 1984	176	Bayamón, Puerto Rico	
Randy Savage	1	September 15, 1984	238	San Juan, Puerto Rico	
Hercules Ayala	1	March 2, 1985	310	Ponce, Puerto Rico	
Jos LeDuc	1	January 6, 1986	60	San Juan, Puerto Rico	
Al Perez	1	March 7, 1986	233	Fajardo, Puerto Rico	
Vacant on October 22, 1986 when Perez won the WWC Puerto Rico Heavyweight Championship.
Bob Heffernan	1	December 21, 1986	62	San Juan, Puerto Rico	Won a 6-man tournament final.
Miguel Pérez, Jr.	1	February 21, 1987	70	Cataño, Puerto Rico	
TNT	1	May 2, 1987	245	Caguas, Puerto Rico	
Abdullah the Butcher	2	January 30, 1988	441	San Juan, Puerto Rico	
Invader I	4	April 15, 1989	1	San Juan, Puerto Rico	
Inactive on April 16, 1989.
Manny Fernandez	1	August 31, 1991	71	Pembroke, North Carolina	Reigning SAPW Heavyweight champion, recognized as North America Heavyweight champion in WWC.
Inactive on November 10, 1991 when Fernandez left from SAPW.
AWF North America Heavyweight Championship
Tony Atlas #	1	May 2, 1992	63	Carolina, Puerto Rico	Won a 6-man tournament final.
José Miguel Pérez #	1	July 4, 1992	155	Caguas, Puerto Rico	
WWC North America Heavyweight Championship
Fidel Sierra	1	December 6, 1992	70	Japan	
Inactive on February 14, 1993 after Fidel Sierra left from WWC.
IWA North America Heavyweight Championship
Ricky Santana #	1	February 5, 1994	21	San Juan, Puerto Rico	Won a 6-man tournament final.
Inactive on February 26, 1994 after Ricky Santana left from IWA (Puerto Rico).

== Combined reigns ==
#	Indicates not recognized by WWC.

Rank	Wrestler	No. of reigns	Combined days
1	Carlos Colón	9	1,258
2	Gorilla Monsoon	2	503
3	Abdullah the Butcher	2	474
4	Invader I	4	382
5	Pedro Morales	2	371
6	Hercules Ayala	1	310
7	Pierre Martel	3	294
8	TNT	1	245
9	Randy Savage	1	238
10	Al Perez	1	233
11	Mr. Fuji	1	175
12	Gil Hayes	1	167
13	Buddy Landel	1	112
14	Hart Love	1	96
15	Bruno Sammartino	1	78
16	Sweet Daddy Siki	1	77
17	Manny Fernandez	1	71
18	Miguel Pérez, Jr.	1	70
18	Fidel Sierra	1	70
19	Bob Heffernan	1	62
20	Jos LeDuc	1	60
21	Mad Dog Lafaib	1	57
22	“Cowboy” Bob Ellis	1	56
23	Killer Karl Krupp	1	49
24	Ernie Ladd	1	33
25	Bobby Jaggers	1	30
26	Eric the Red	1	28
27	Don Kent	1	27
28	Spoiler I	1	26
29	Ricky Santana #	1	21
30	Roger Kirby	1	19
31	Tony Atlas	1	????

== See also ==
- World Wrestling Council
