= NWA International Tag Team Championship (Toronto version) =

Professional wrestling tag team championship

Details
- Promotion: Maple Leaf Wrestling
- Date established: June 8, 1961
Statistics
- First champion(s): Man Mountain Campbell and Stan Stasiak
- Final champion(s): The Crusaders (Billy Red Lyons and Dewey Robertson)
- Most reigns: The Crusaders (3 reigns); Chris and John Tolos (3 reigns)

The Toronto version of the NWA International Tag Team Championship was the top tag team professional wrestling championship in the Canadian promotion Maple Leaf Wrestling from 1961 through 1977. The title replaced the original top tag championship in Maple Leaf Wrestling, the NWA Canadian Open Tag Team Championship, which was abandoned in favor of the international title.

== Title history ==
Key
No.	Overall reign number
Reign	Reign number for the specific team—reign numbers for the individuals are in parentheses, if different
Days	Number of days held

No.	Champion	Championship change			Reign statistics		Notes	Ref.
No.	Champion	Date	Event	Location	Reign	Days	Notes	Ref.
1	Man Mountain Campbell and Stan Stasiak	June 8, 1961	MLW show	Toronto, ON	1	91	Defeated Ivan and Karol Kalmikoff in a tournament final to become the first champions.	
2	Cyclone and Hurricane Smith	September 7, 1961	MLW show	Toronto, ON	1	91		
3	Chris and John Tolos	December 7, 1961	MLW show	Toronto, ON	1	21		
4	Whipper Billy Watson and Yukon Eric	December 28, 1961	MLW show	Toronto, ON	1	7		
5	Chris and John Tolos	January 4, 1962	MLW show	Toronto, ON	2	14		
6	Bill Soloweyko and Whipper Billy Watson (2)	January 18, 1962	MLW show	Toronto, ON	1	56		
7	Chris and John Tolos	March 15, 1962	MLW show	Toronto, ON	3	7		
8	Billy Red Lyons and Whipper Billy Watson (3)	March 22, 1962	MLW show	Toronto, ON	1	13		
9	Bulldog Brower and Sweet Daddy Siki	April 4, 1962	MLW show	Toronto, ON	1	176		
10	Bruno Sammartino and Whipper Billy Watson (4)	September 27, 1962	MLW show	Toronto, ON	1	154		
11	Bulldog Brower (2) and Johnny Valentine	February 28, 1963	MLW show	Toronto, ON	1	147		
12	John Paul Henning and Art Thomas	July 25, 1963	MLW show	Toronto, ON	1	84		
13	Bulldog Brower (3) and Dr. Jerry Graham	October 17, 1963	MLW show	Toronto, ON	1	49		
14	Jim Hady and Johnny Valentine (2)	December 5, 1963	MLW show	Toronto, ON	1	N/A		
15	Fred Atkins and Professor Hiro	June 9, 1964 (NLT)	MLW show	Hamilton.ON	1	N/A		
16	Johnny Valentine (3) and Whipper Billy Watson (5)	August 13, 1964	MLW show	Toronto, ON	1	35		
17	Fred Atkins and Professor Hiro	September 17, 1964	MLW show	Toronto, ON	2	22		
18	Johnny Valentine (4) and Whipper Billy Watson (6)	October 9, 1964	MLW show	Toronto, ON	2	457	The title was inactive for all of 1965.	
19	The Masked Yankees (Moose Evans and Giant Evans)	January 9, 1966	MLW show	Toronto, ON	1	182		
20	Bulldog Brower (4) and Whipper Billy Watson (7)	July 10, 1966	MLW show	Toronto, ON	1	21		
21	Fred Atkins (3) and Tiger Jeet Singh	July 31, 1966	MLW show	Toronto, ON	1	N/A		
22	Bulldog Brower (5) and Whipper Billy Watson (8)	December 1966 (NLT)	MLW show	N/A	2	N/A	The title was inactive for a majority of 1967. Brower and Watson were billed as champions after.	
23	Bull Curry and Tiger Jeet Singh (2)	May 26, 1968	MLW show	Toronto, ON	1	91		
24	Mark Lewin and Whipper Billy Watson (9)	August 25, 1968	MLW show	N/A	1	N/A		
—	Vacated	1968	—	—	—	—	Championship was inactive	
25	The Love Brothers (Hartford and Reginald Love)	March 17, 1974	MLW show	Toronto, ON	1	98	Defeated Jacques Rougeau, Sr. and Raymond Rougeau when the title was reactivated.	
26	The Crusaders (Billy Red Lyons (2) and Dewey Robertson)	June 23, 1974	MLW show	Toronto, ON	1	77		
27	The Love Brothers (Hartford and Reginald Love)	September 8, 1974	MLW show	Toronto, ON	2	112		
28	The Crusaders (Billy Red Lyons (3) and Dewey Robertson)	December 29, 1974	MLW show	Toronto, ON	2	161		
29	The Kelly Twins (Mike and Pat Kelly)	June 8, 1975	MLW show	Toronto, ON	1	77		
30	The Crusaders (Billy Red Lyons (4) and Dewey Robertson)	August 24, 1975	MLW show	Toronto, ON	3	N/A		
—	Deactivated	September 1977	—	—	—	—		

== See also ==
- Maple Leaf Wrestling
- Other versions of the NWA International Tag Team Championship

- Amarillo – (1959-1975; NWA Western States)
- Calgary – (1958-1989, 2000-2008; Stampede Wrestling - since renamed Stampede International Tag Team Championship)
- Georgia – (1956-1963; National Wrestling Alliance)
- Japan and Texas – (1962-1988; Japan Wrestling Association, NWA Western States and All Japan Pro Wrestling - now part of World Tag Team Championship)
- Minneapolis – (1959-1960; NWA Minneapolis)
- Vancouver – (1982-1985; NWA All-Star Wrestling)
