= NWF Heavyweight Championship =

Professional wrestling championship

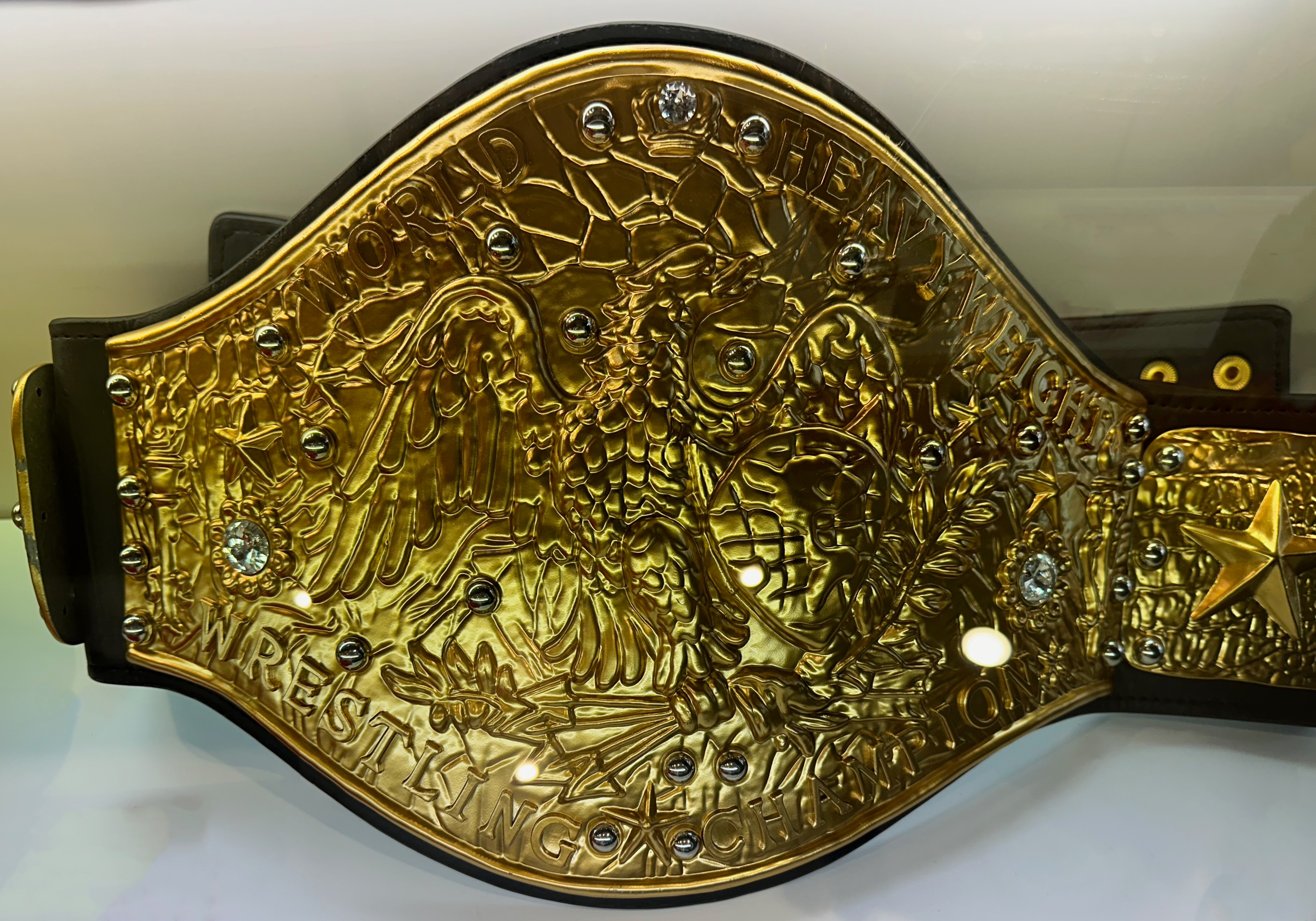

Details
- Promotion: National Wrestling Federation (NWF); New Japan Pro-Wrestling (NJPW)
- Date established: 1970; 2002
- Date retired: 1981; 2004

Other names
- NWF World Heavyweight Championship (1970–1976); NWF Heavyweight Championship (1976–1981, 2002–2004)
Statistics
- First champion: Johnny Powers
- Final champion: Antonio Inoki
- Most reigns: Antonio Inoki (4 reigns)
- Longest reign: Antonio Inoki (1,688 days)

The NWF Heavyweight Championship was a professional wrestling world heavyweight championship used as part of the National Wrestling Federation and later New Japan Pro-Wrestling.

== History ==
The NWF (National Wrestling Federation) Heavyweight Championship was created by wrestling promoter Pedro Martinez for his NWF promotion in New York in 1970. The title was mainly defended in the New York/Eastern Canada area, until then-champion Johnny Powers took the belt with him on a tour of Japan with Tokyo Pro Wrestling. Powers would eventually lose the title to Antonio Inoki, who would take the belt with him when he founded New Japan Pro-Wrestling.

Inoki became the wrestler most associated with the title due to his high-profile defenses of the title, defeating the likes of Stan Hansen, André the Giant, Tiger Jeet Singh, and Ernie Ladd while champion. Recognized as a four-time NWF Heavyweight champion, between the years of 1973 and 1983 Inoki was champion for all but six months. Inoki's fourth reign was actually due to the decision to hold up the championship, following a defense against Stan Hansen on April 17, 1981, that ended in a no contest. Inoki later regained the title on April 23, 1981, by defeating Hansen in a rematch. He retired the NWF title immediately after the match due to his desire to enter the 1983 IWGP League.

Then as part of a NJPW storyline, the NWF Heavyweight championship was revived in August 2002. Mixed martial arts fighter Kazuyuki Fujita held a tournament to crown a new champion to rival the IWGP Heavyweight Championship. The tournament participants were announced to be wrestlers with a background in MMA, including Fujita, Yoshihiro Takayama, Tsuyoshi Kosaka, and Tadao Yasuda. Takayama won the tournament on January 4, 2003, beating Kosaka with a knee kick in the finals to become the first revived champion in over two decades. Takayama later lost the NWF Championship to Shinsuke Nakamura exactly a year later to unify the NWF and IWGP titles. Nakamura formally announced his vacating of the NWF Heavyweight title on January 5, 2004, retiring the belt for a second time during its history.

== Reigns ==
=== Original version ===
Key
No.	Overall reign number
Reign	Reign number for the specific champion
Days	Number of days held
N/A	Unknown information
(NLT)	Championship change took place "no later than" the date listed

No.	Champion	Championship change			Reign statistics		Notes	Ref.
No.	Champion	Date	Event	Location	Reign	Days	Notes	Ref.
National Wrestling Federation (NWF) and New Japan Pro Wrestling (NJPW)
1	Johnny Powers	April 1970 (NLT)	Live event	Los Angeles, CA	1	(Note: The exact date the championship was won is uncertain, which means that the reign lasted between 324 and 688 days.)	Defeated Freddie Blassie to become inaugural champion. First mention as "heavyweight champion" after defeating "Bulldog" Dick Brower on April 25th, 1970 in Akron, OH.	
2	Waldo Von Erich	October 23, 1971	Live event	Akron, OH	1	15	The Title held-up on November 7th, 1971, after a match with Dominic DeNucci in Akron, OH.	
3	Waldo Von Erich	November 13, 1971	live event	Akron, OH	2	19	Defeated Dominic DeNucci in rematch.	
4	Dominic DeNucci	December 2, 1971	Live event	Cleveland, OH	1	28		
5	Waldo Von Erich	December 30, 1971	Live event	Cleveland, OH	3	162		
6	Ernie Ladd	June 9, 1972	Live event	Cleveland, OH	1	15		
7	Abdullah the Butcher	June 24, 1972	Live event	Akron, OH	1	(Note: The exact date the championship was lost is uncertain, which means that the reign lasted between 1 and 98 days.)		
8	Victor Rivera	September 1972 (NLT)	Live event	N/A	1	(Note: The exact date the championship was won is uncertain, which means that the reign lasted between 1 and 98 days.)		
9	Abdullah the Butcher	October 1972 (NLT)	Live event	N/A	2	(Note: The exact date the championship was won is uncertain, which means that the reign lasted between 1 and 47 days.)		
10	Johnny Valentine	October 19, 1972	Live event	Cleveland, OH	1	49		
—	Vacated	December 7, 1972	—	—	—	—	After a match against Johnny Powers, Johnny Valentine left the NWF in January 1973.	
11	Jacques Rougeau	January 24, 1973	Live event	Buffalo, NY	1	(Note: The exact date the championship was won is uncertain, which means that the reign lasted between 1 and 218 days.)	Defeated Waldo Von Erich in finals of tournament for the vacant championship.	
12	Johnny Valentine	August 1973 (NLT)	Live event	N/A	2	(Note: The exact date the championship was won is uncertain, which means that the reign lasted between 1 and 319 days.)		
13	Johnny Powers	October 1973 (NLT)	Live event	N/A	2	(Note: The exact date the championship was won is uncertain, which means that the reign lasted between 1 and 319 days.)	Powers took the title to Japan for a tour with New Japan Pro-Wrestling	
14	Antonio Inoki	December 10, 1973	World Title Challenge Series	Tokyo, Japan	1	429		
—	Vacated	February 12, 1975	—	—	—	—	Antonio Inoki vacated the championship as refusal of an NWF ordered defense against Tiger Jeet Singh.	
15	Tiger Jeet Singh	March 13, 1975	Big Fight Series	Hiroshima, Japan	1	105	Defeated Antonio Inoki for the vacant championship.	
16	Antonio Inoki	June 26, 1975	Golden Fight Series	Tokyo, Japan	2	1,688	Ordered by the NWA to stop referring to belt as a world title at annual NWA meeting on August 7, 1976.	
17	Stan Hansen	February 8, 1980	New Year Golden Series	Tokyo, Japan	1	55	This title change was via countout	
18	Antonio Inoki	April 3, 1980	Big Fight Series	Tokyo, Japan	3	379		
—	Vacated	April 17, 1981	Big Fight Series II	Kagoshima, Japan	—	—	The championship was vacated after a defense against Stan Hansen ends in a no contest.	
19	Antonio Inoki	April 23, 1981	Big Fight Series II	Tokyo, Japan	4	(Note: The exact date the championship was won is uncertain, which means that the reign lasted between 1 and 15 days.)	Defeated Stan Hansen to win the vacant championship.	
—	Deactivated	April 23, 1981	—	—	—	—	Antonio Inoki vacated the championship following the match to enter the NJPW IWGP League.	

=== Revived version ===
NWF Heavyweight Championship

Details
- Promotion: New Japan Pro-Wrestling (NJPW)
- Date established: August 2002
- Date retired: January 2004
Statistics
- First champion: Yoshihiro Takayama
- Final champion: Shinsuke Nakamura
- Longest reign: Yoshihiro Takayama (365 days)
- Shortest reign: Shinsuke Nakamura (<1 day)
- Oldest champion: Yoshihiro Takayama (36 years, 107 days)
- Youngest champion: Shinsuke Nakamura (23 years, 314 days)

Key
No.	Overall reign number
Reign	Reign number for the specific champion
Days	Number of days held
Defenses	Number of successful defenses

No.	Champion	Championship change			Reign statistics			Notes	Ref.
No.	Champion	Date	Event	Location	Reign	Days	Defenses	Notes	Ref.
New Japan Pro Wrestling (NJPW)
1	Yoshihiro Takayama	January 4, 2003	Wrestling World 2003	Tokyo, Japan	1	365	7	Defeated Tsuyoshi Kosaka in a tournament for the revived title.	
2	Shinsuke Nakamura	January 4, 2004	Wrestling World 2004	Tokyo, Japan	1	1	0	Nakamura officially unifies NWF title with the IWGP Heavyweight Championship.	
—	Unified	January 5, 2004	—	—	—	—	—	Championship merged with IWGP Heavyweight Championship, no longer promoted as a separate title	

== See also ==
Contemporary titles in Japan:

- NWA Worlds Heavyweight Championship
- NWA International Heavyweight Championship
- PWF Heavyweight Championship
- IWA World Heavyweight Championship

Former belt used for a shoot-style title in Japan:

- World Heavyweight Championship (UWF International)

Sporting positions
Preceded by Real World Championship	New Japan Pro-Wrestling's top heavyweight championship 1973–1981; 2003–2004	Succeeded by 1981: IWGP Heavyweight Championship (original version); 2004: IWGP Heavyweight Championship (modern version)
