= Jack Reynolds (broadcaster) =

American broadcaster

- Born: Joseph James Rizzo; January 1, 1937; Cleveland, Ohio
- Died: October 16, 2008 (aged 71); Cleveland Clinic
- Occupation: Wrestling announcer
- Known for: Hosting professional wrestling telecasts (IWA, NWF, WWF)

Jack Reynolds (1937 – October 16, 2008), born Joseph James Rizzo, was an American broadcaster from Cleveland, Ohio, who was better known outside of his hometown as a professional wrestling announcer.

== Broadcasting career ==
Cleveland area native Rizzo (who used the Jack Reynolds name on-air due to a feeling back then that his real name would sound "too ethnic") had a career in radio and television in Cleveland over several decades. He was a DJ/talk show host for the old WGAR AM 1220 and the old WWWE AM 1100. He was the booth announcer for then-independent TV station WUAB channel 43 (now Cleveland's affiliate for The CW), where he was the original host (and later frequent substitute host) of the long running afternoon Prize Movie. He was also an on-air spokesman (on both radio and TV) for several local businesses.

Reynolds landed a brief speaking part in The Godfather as an Army captain in the wedding scene. His line "I haven't had this much fun since the blitzkrieg" was cut from the finished film.

=== Professional wrestling ===
Nationally, Reynolds was known for being a professional wrestling play by play voice. His first stint announcing wrestling came with the short-lived IWA promotion in 1975, which had attempted to establish a national wrestling promotion years before Vince McMahon had done so. He also worked alongside Pedro Martinez's son Ron announcing for the Buffalo, NY-based National Wrestling Federation.

This experience had apparently served him well, as Reynolds joined the World Wrestling Federation's broadcast team in September 1984. He replaced Vince McMahon as the play-by-play announcer for the WWF's syndicated program All-Star Wrestling, which was being taped at various venues in southern Ontario and repackaged and aired in Canada as Maple Leaf Wrestling.

At the broadcast table, he was initially paired with Canadian Football League legend turned professional wrestler Angelo "King Kong" Mosca, but, in January 1985, Jesse "The Body" Ventura, making his broadcasting debut, replaced Mosca as color commentator when Mosca left his broadcasting job to concentrate on managing his son, Angelo Mosca Jr., who had just entered the WWF. Reynolds and Ventura were also the original hosts of WWF Prime Time Wrestling when it debuted in January 1985 on the USA Network.

In addition, during his time with the WWF, Reynolds was the regular play-by-play announcer, paired with Billy Red Lyons as color commentator, for matches taped at Maple Leaf Gardens in Toronto that aired on Prime Time Wrestling or other WWF programming.

In July 1985, Gorilla Monsoon replaced Reynolds as the play-by-play announcer for All-Star Wrestling. Monsoon had also replaced Reynolds as host of Prime Time Wrestling. Reynolds stuck around as a fill-in announcer before calling one last show in Detroit for the WWF in April 1986 alongside Ken Resnick.

Post WWF (now WWE) Reynolds continued to work in wrestling, traveling around the world on tours with former WWF stars such as Greg Valentine, King Kong Bundy, Kamala, Brutus Beefcake, and others all throughout the '90s and into the 2000s.

== Death ==
Reynolds died at age 71 on Thursday, October 16, 2008, at the Cleveland Clinic in Cleveland, Ohio after complications from a recent surgery.
