= Sweet Daddy Siki =

American-Canadian wrestler (1933–2024)

Personal information
- Born: Elkin James; June 16, 1933 Montgomery, Texas, U.S.
- Died: December 31, 2024 (aged 91) Toronto, Ontario, Canada

Professional wrestling career
- Ring name(s): Mr. Irresistible; Reggie Siki; Sweet Daddy Siki
- Billed height: 5 ft 10 in (178 cm)
- Billed weight: 245 lb (111 kg)
- Trained by: Sandor Szabo; Ray Ortega
- Debut: 1955
- Retired: 1987

Reginald Elkin James (June 16, 1933 – December 31, 2024) was an American-Canadian professional wrestler and singer, best known as Sweet Daddy Siki.

== Life and career ==
Siki started wrestling in 1955 in Artesia, New Mexico. He also did some training in Los Angeles with Sandor Szabo and Ray Ortega. He said he weighed about 180 pounds when he started, but within three years weighed in at 230.

He moved to Toronto in 1961 because it was a central location from which to travel across North America. He lived there for the rest of his life, and used Toronto as a base for his country & western band and his work as a karaoke DJ at The Duke on Queen Street East. Siki was a top draw in Canada in the 1960s and 1970s. He fought in Stampede Wrestling for years, travelled with Bearman McKigney's circuit and was a mainstay of the eastern scene. Siki is best known for his headbutt or "coco butt" and his "neckbreaker" maneuver. At his peak, Siki was a main card attraction at Maple Leaf Gardens and drew fans by the busloads. He had made his Maple Leaf Gardens debut in 1962 and wrestled there until 1980. In his peak at Maple Leaf Gardens, he earned up to $3,000 a bout and received bundles of mail from fans around the world. In the 1970s, Siki wrestled two well-known radio & television hosts in Toronto: CHUM radio's Terry Steele and CITY-TV's Gene Taylor. He used an airplane spin as a finisher in both matches.

Siki was brought into CWA Memphis on March 25, 1985, by Tux Newman for 3 weeks. He first wrestled a handicap match and then wrestled Mike Sharpe the two following weeks.

Siki later hosted karaoke Saturday afternoons at The Duke bar at Queen and Leslie Streets in Toronto. Along the way, he accrued six major wrestling belts, including the Austra-Asian championship, the North American championship (three times), the Texas championship and the tag-team heavyweight crown. Siki suffered many injuries throughout his career. He suffered from two broken ribs, had his hands broken twice, his ankle and leg broken, and half his face paralyzed. In the 1980s, he wrestled across the Maritimes and in small Northern Ontario towns. Siki wrote his own theme song entitled "I Am So Proud of What I See". Siki also released an album on vinyl.

During this time, he also started to teach the craft at Sully's Toronto Youth Athletic Club on Sundays. He continued to wrestle into the 1990s. He was also affiliated with a Toronto wrestling school through the 1980s and to the mid-1990s, initially in partnership with Johnny Powers. Besides Canada, Siki has wrestled across the United States, and in Australia, New Zealand, Japan, Puerto Rico, the Bahamas, and Trinidad. The second album by The Henrys, Chasing Grace, contains a song titled 'Sweet Daddy Siki'. Toronto based Pork Belly Futures featured him in their second album with the song "Sweet Daddy" Siki made an appearance on WWE Smackdown on September 13, 2011, for Edge Appreciation Night, along with several other WWE Legends and former superstars.

Siki resided in Toronto. He died from complications of dementia in Toronto, on December 31, 2024, at the age of 91.

== Championships and accomplishments ==
- 50th State Big Time Wrestling
  - NWA North American Heavyweight Championship (Hawaii version) (1 time)
  - NWA Hawaii Tag Team Championship (1 time) - with Moondog Mayne
- Atlantic Grand Prix Wrestling
  - AGPW North American Tag Team Championship (1 time) - with Cuban Assassin
- Big Time Wrestling
  - BTW World Tag Team Championship (1 time) - with Haystacks Calhoun
- International Professional Wrestling Hall of Fame
  - Class of 2023
- Maple Leaf Wrestling
  - NWA International Tag Team Championship (Toronto version) (1 time) - with Bulldog Brower
- NWA All Star Wrestling
  - NWA Canadian Tag Team Championship (Vancouver version) (1 time) - with Kinji Shibuya
- Southwest Sports, Inc.
  - NWA Texas Heavyweight Championship (1 time)
- Midwest Wrestling Association
  - MWA Ohio Tag Team Championship (1 time) - with Leon Graham
- NWA Ohio
  - NWA Eastern States Heavyweight Championship (1 time)^{1}
- Professional wrestling
  - World Negro Heavyweight Championship (1 time)
- Stampede Wrestling
  - NWA Canadian Heavyweight Championship (Calgary version) (1 time)
  - Stampede North American Heavyweight Championship (1 time)
- World Wrestling Council
  - WWC North American Heavyweight Championship (2 times)
- Canadian Wrestling Hall of Fame
  - Class of 2016

^{1}This title should not be confused with the NWA Eastern States Heavyweight Championship that was defended in Mid-Atlantic Championship Wrestling in the early to mid-1970s. This title would go on to be renamed the NWA Mid-Atlantic Heavyweight Championship.
