= Waldo Von Erich =

Canadian professional wrestler (1933–2009)

Personal information
- Born: Walter Paul Sieber; October 2, 1933 Toronto, Ontario, Canada
- Died: July 5, 2009 (aged 75) Kitchener, Ontario, Canada
- Cause of death: Falling
- Spouse: Anne Elizabeth Jones (m. 1959; div. 1988)
- Children: 3

Professional wrestling career
- Ring name(s): Baron Von Sieber; El Tigre; The Great Hornet; The Great Zimm; Green Hornet; Kurt Von Seiber; Mr. M Waldo Von Erich; Waldo Von Sieber; Wally Seiber; Walter Von Sieber
- Billed height: 6 ft 0 in (183 cm)
- Billed weight: 265 lb (120 kg)
- Billed from: Berlin, Germany
- Trained by: Red Garner
- Debut: 1950
- Retired: 1979

Walter Paul Sieber (October 2, 1933 – July 5, 2009) was a Canadian professional wrestler. He is best known for performing under the ring name Waldo Von Erich, playing the character of a villainous Prussian Nazi. He was billed as the brother of Fritz Von Erich, making him a kayfabe member of the Von Erich family.

== Early life ==
Sieber was born in Toronto, Ontario. His parents divorced when he was seven. As a youth, he participated in weightlifting at the YMCA in Weston along other future professional wrestlers including Dave McKigney, Geeto Mongol, and Mikel Scicluna. At the age of 16, he began training as a professional wrestler under Red Garner in a garage in Richmond Hill.

== Professional wrestling career ==
Sieber debuted at the age of 17 under the ring name "Waldo Von Sieber". He began his career in Calgary, wrestling for Stu Hart's Stampede Wrestling promotion using the character of an evil German. In the late-1950s, Hart paired Sieber with Fritz Von Erich, who also portrayed a villainous German. With Sieber changing his ring name to "Waldo Von Erich", the duo billed themselves as brothers and formed a tag team.

In 1964, Von Erich headlined Madison Square Garden in three bouts against Bruno Sammartino for the WWWF Heavyweight Championship. The first bout lasted 81 minutes, ending in a draw when the match had to be halted due to an 11 o'clock curfew. The two following bouts were won by Sammartino.

In 1968, Sieber unsuccessfully challenged Gene Kiniski for the NWA World Heavyweight Championship in a Texas death match promoted by NWA Big Time Wrestling in the HemisFair Arena in San Antonio, Texas.

In 1970, Sieber lost to "Sonny", a 750 lb Kodiak bear, in a bout for NWA Tri-State staged in the Monroe Civic Center in Monroe, Louisiana.

Sieber briefly retired in 1973, but returned to the ring later that year. He wrestled for the WWWF throughout the mid-1970s, unsuccessfully challenging Bruno Sammartino for the WWWF Heavyweight Championship in 1976.

== Retirement ==
Sieber retired from professional wrestling in 1979. He studied reflexology and began working as a physical therapist in Kitchener. He also worked as an inventor, with his creations including the "Inverchair", an inverted chair device enabling him to hang upside down to alleviate his back pain which he sold to customers including the Department of National Defence.

In the 1990s, Sieber was affiliated with Joe Frocklage's International Championship Wrestling promotion and school in Cambridge, where he trained wrestlers including Eric Young and The Highlanders.

== Professional wrestling persona ==
For much of his career, Sieber portrayed a Prussian Nazi. As "Waldo Von Sieber" (also on occasion "Baron Von Sieber" or "Walter Von Sieber"), and later as "Waldo Von Erich", Sieber grew his blond hair long, wore a Stahlhelm, armband, and monocle, and carried a crop to the ring. His finishing move, a diving knee drop, was known as the "Blitzkrieg" in reference to the military tactic employed by Germany in World War II. Other finishing moves utilised by Sieber included a hold known as the "Prussian Deathlock" and a body press.

While not recognised as an exceptional technical wrestler, Sieber was known for his ability to draw the ire of audiences, leading promoter Vincent J. McMahon to remark "You know, Waldo, I know what you're like, but I hate your guts when you're in that ring."

== Personal life ==
Sieber was the only child of Paul Sieber Sr. (a German immigrant) and Anna Yost (a Romanian immigrant).

Sieber married Anne Elizabeth "Betty" Jones in 1959; the couple divorced in 1988. They had three daughters together.

Although Sieber was billed as being the brother of Jack Barton Adkisson Sr. (Fritz Von Erich), the two men were not related. However, Sieber was a distant cousin of Doris Adkisson, Adkisson Sr.'s wife. In 1985, professional wrestler William Vaughan was introduced to Fritz Von Erich's World Class Championship Wrestling promotion under the ring name Lance Von Erich, purportedly the son of Waldo Von Erich; Vaughan and Sieber were not related.

== Death ==
After falling on July 5, 2009, Sieber died in hospital in Kitchener, Ontario later that day at the age of 75.

== Championships and accomplishments ==
- Mid-Atlantic Championship Wrestling
  - NWA Southern Tag Team Championship (Mid-Atlantic version) (1 time) - with Fritz Von Erich
- National Wrestling Federation
  - NWF Heavyweight Championship (2 times)
  - NWF North American Heavyweight Championship (1 time)
- NWA Big Time Wrestling
  - NWA American Tag Team Championship (2 time) - with Fritz Von Erich
  - NWA Brass Knuckles Championship (Texas version) (2 times)
  - NWA Texas Heavyweight Championship (1 time)
- NWA Tri-State
  - NWA North American Heavyweight Championship (Tri-State version) (1 time)
  - NWA United States Tag Team Championship (Tri-State version) (1 time) - with Karl Von Brauner
- Stampede Wrestling
  - NWA Canadian Heavyweight Championship (Calgary version) (1 time)
  - Stampede Wrestling North American Championship (1 time)
  - Stampede Wrestling Hall of Fame (Class of 1995)
- World Championship Wrestling
  - IWA World Tag Team Championship (2 times) - with The Spoiler
  - NWA Austra-Asian Heavyweight Championship (1 time)
  - NWA Austra-Asian Tag Team Championship (1 time) - with Hiro Tojo
- World Wide Wrestling Federation
  - WWWF United States Tag Team Championship (1 time) - with Gene Kiniski
