= Johnny Powers (wrestler) =

Canadian professional wrestler (1943–2022)

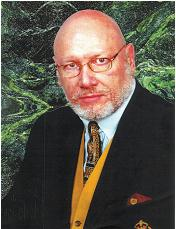

Personal information
- Born: Dennis Waters; March 20, 1943 Hamilton, Ontario, Canada
- Died: December 30, 2022 (aged 79) Smithville, Ontario, Canada

Professional wrestling career
- Ring name(s): Johnny Powers; Lord Anthony Lansdowne
- Billed height: 6 ft 4 in (1.93 m)
- Billed weight: 265 lb (120 kg)
- Trained by: Jack Wentworth; Johnny Valentine; Lou Thesz; Toots Mondt; Pedro Martínez
- Debut: 1960
- Retired: 1982

Johnny Powers (born Dennis Waters; March 20, 1943 – December 30, 2022) was a Canadian professional wrestler. He competed in several North American and International promotions including National Wrestling Alliance (NWA), American Wrestling Association (AWA), Maple Leaf Wrestling, National Wrestling Federation, International Wrestling Association and the World Wide Wrestling Federation feuding with then WWWF World Heavyweight Champion Bruno Sammartino during the early 1960s NWA's Lou Thesz, Gene Kiniski and AWA's Verne Gagne.

As a sports event promoter and television producer since 1967, he has presented over 3,500 live wrestling and sports events from Singapore to New York City to Trinidad. He co-founded the National Wrestling Federation (NWF), which he sold to Japanese interests in 1973. Powers was the first major international syndicator of television wrestling with programs in over 27 countries.

== Professional wrestling career ==
Dennis Waters was born in Hamilton, Ontario. At 15, he started training under the tutelage of Canadian light heavyweight wrestling champion Jack Wentworth. Powers had his first professional match in 1960 in Detroit at age 17 while attending McMaster University in Hamilton. He left university and became a professional wrestler, formally turning professional at age 20 in Detroit as Lord Anthony Lansdowne.

Johnny Powers, 1964

Powers wrestled Larry Chene many times, who then mentored Powers. Powers dyed his hair blond and wrestled as Johnny Powers, the Golden Adonis, in the Northeast United States and Canada in 1964. Powers wrestled six times for the WWWF Heavyweight Championship against Bruno Sammartino in Pittsburgh and Philadelphia. Powers turned heel and was managed by Bobby Davis. He fought Whipper Billy Watson many times across Canada and was main event for two years in Canada's Maple Leaf Gardens in Toronto. Powers fought NWA World Champions Lou Thesz outdoors in Hamilton ballpark and St Louis Kiel Auditorium and Gene Kiniski in Toronto ballpark and the Hamilton Forum. Powers dominated Cleveland Ohio with great battles against Johnny Valentine, The Sheik, Ernie Ladd and Abdullah the Butcher. In 1973, Powers wrestled Ladd in a match, during which wrestler Ox Baker turned on Ladd to side with Powers. As a result, angry fans stormed the ring—an incident known as "The Cleveland Riot" and one of the most dangerous riots in professional wrestling history.

Lord Anthony Lansdowne, 1963

Powers was tutored as a wrestling promoter and television producer by international old school wrestler, booker and classic promoter Pedro Martínez. Martinez coached and mentored Powers for 20 years from the age of 22 in the art of creative event marketing of pro wrestling. Martínez and Powers founded National Sports TV on an existing "Wrestling from Buffalo Auditorium" library of black and white films. This library had been funded by one of pro wrestling's first big money sponsors, Dow beer.

Johnny Powers, North American Champion, 1973

Powers co-founded the National Wrestling Federation and sold it three years later in 1973 to New Japan Pro-Wrestling. He was the NWF World Heavyweight Champion and was the star of "Championship Wrestling with Johnny Powers". He was NWF North American Champion seven times and NWF world champion three times (same title).

Powers sold television wrestling shows and films to Japan, Mexico, the Armed Forces Network and eventually to 27 countries creating the first and largest international professional wrestling television distribution network. Martinez and Powers owned the largest professional wrestling library in the world at that time with acquisition of most of the other key US wrestling territories television libraries. Powers also, as executive producer and on-air commentator, promoted and produced over 300 new hours of televised wrestling.

Johnny Powers, USA, 1979

Powers held the first barbed wire top rope wrapped match and paid a record athletic commission fine. After watching a Barnum and Bailey circus, he produced and promoted the only three rings at a time Cleveland Stadium Super Card with 50 global stars. Powers was defeated by Antonio Inoki for the NWF World Heavyweight Championship December 10, 1973, in Tokyo. Powers, a seven time North American Open champion, defended his title in the New Japan promotion.

Powers and Pat Patterson fought as NWF North American Tag Team Champions in California and Japan. In the Los Angeles title match, Joe Louis was referee.

Powers with Pedro Martínez acquired control of the International Wrestling Association (IWA) in 1975 and Powers later bought out the Martinez interest for 100% ownership in 1976.

Powers retired from wrestling in 1982. He was honored in Yokohama, Japan, before a sellout crowd on September 30, 1991, that was televised nationally, as one of 18 greatest fighters to have appeared in Japanese rings, along with Karl Gotch and Muhammad Ali. He was inducted into the Canadian Professional Wrestling Hall of Fame in 2003.

== Other business ventures ==
As a sports merchandiser, Powers was physical fitness adviser on a National Sports Advisory Council in Canada, with Bobby Hull and Otto and Maria Jelinek. At the age of 22, as a principal in Pro Management Inc, a sports celebrity management firm, he developed and took sports fitness equipment nationally on a major retail store promotion campaign all the while actively competing internationally as Canadian Heavyweight Champion.

Powers was CEO and Chief Creative Officer of Vision Resource Group, Inc., a pay-per-view company.

Powers helped to sponsor the Canadian pankration team and was strength coach to the World Pankration Championships in Lamia, Greece where they won eight gold metals and the overall World title.

Powers also had a film project, in development, entitled The Man They Could Not Kill.

== Personal life ==
Powers, underwent knee and hip replacement surgery in May 2009.

Powers died at his home in Smithville, Ontario on December 30, 2022, at the age of 79.

== Championships and accomplishments ==
- International Wrestling Association
  - IWA World Heavyweight Championship (6 times)
- International Wrestling Association
  - IWA World Tag Team Championship (3 times) - with Nelson Royal (1), Bulldog Brower (1) and Nick DeCarlo (1)
- National Wrestling Federation
  - NWF Heavyweight Championship (2 times)
  - NWF North American Heavyweight Championship (12 times)
  - NWF World Tag Team Championship (2 times) - with Chief White Owl (1) and Jacques Rougeau (1)
- New Japan Pro-Wrestling
  - NWA North American Tag Team Championship (Los Angeles/Japan version) (1 time) - with Patt Patterson
- Halls of Fame
  - Canadian Professional Wrestling Hall of Fame (2003)
  - New Japan Pro-Wrestling's Greatest Fighter in the ring
