= Eddie Einhorn =

American baseball executive (1936–2016)

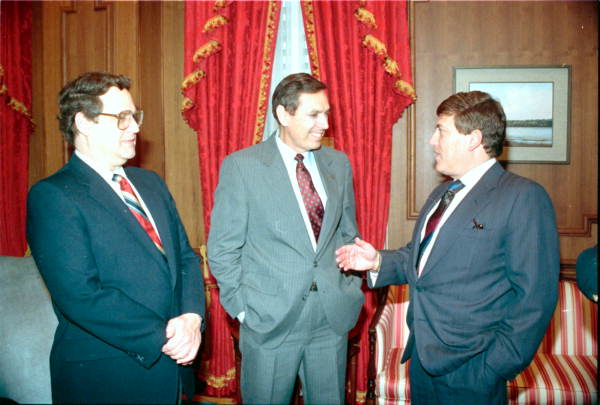
- Einhorn in 1988 (right), pictured with Bob Martinez (middle) and Jerry Reinsdorf (left)
- Born: January 3, 1936; Paterson, New Jersey, U.S.
- Died: February 24, 2016 (aged 80); Alpine, New Jersey, U.S.
- Known for: Broadcasting college basketball games and former vice chairman of the Chicago White Sox
- Spouse: Ann Einhorn (Married 1963)
- Awards: 1x World Series champion (2005 with White Sox)

Eddie Einhorn (January 3, 1936 – February 24, 2016) was minority owner and vice chairman of the Chicago White Sox.

== Biography ==
Einhorn grew up in a Jewish family in Paterson, New Jersey, the son of Mae (née Lippman) and Harold B. Einhorn and resided in Alpine, New Jersey.

Einhorn produced the nationally syndicated radio broadcast of the NCAA Men's Division I Basketball Championship in 1958. In 1960, he founded the TVS Television Network to telecast college basketball games to regional networks at a time when the sport was of no interest to the national networks. The first broadcast was a semi-final game between Bradley University vs. St. Bonaventure University in the 1960 National Invitation Tournament from Madison Square Garden. Einhorn helped put together the first national broadcast of college basketball for the Game of the Century between the Houston Cougars and UCLA Bruins in 1968. He later sold his interest in the network and became the head of CBS Sports. Later, he would co-found subscription TV channel Sportsvision, which, after a number of sales and restructurings, eventually became cable network Sportschannel. For his role in propelling NCAA basketball into a more public light, he was inducted into the National Collegiate Basketball Hall of Fame in 2011.

Einhorn's TVS network carried the World Football League in its inaugural 1974 season. He would later emerge in the United States Football League; as the proposed owner of the league's dormant Chicago franchise, Einhorn was one of the most outspoken supporters of the proposed, but ultimately failed, attempt to move to fall in 1986.

He was an owner of the IWA wrestling promotion in United States in 1975. The promotion was originally intended to be the first one to run cards nationally and promoted mainly in the Midwest and even ran cards in the Carolinas.

After his success as a broadcasting executive, he was selected to join Jerry Reinsdorf's ownership group of the Chicago White Sox when it was purchased in 1981, due in part to him meeting Reinsdorf while he was in law school. While involved in the team, he acted as the team's president and chief operating officer from 1981 to 1990, before transitioning into the role of vice chairman from 1991 to 2015.

Einhorn died on February 24, 2016, at the age of 80 from complications following a stroke. During the 2016 season, the White Sox wore a memorial patch on their uniforms in honor of Einhorn, a black diamond with "Eddie" in the center in white.

== Sources ==
- Einhorn, Eddie; Ron Rapaport (2005). How March Became Madness: How the NCAA Tournament Became the Greatest Sporting Event in America. Chicago, Illinois: Triumph Books. ISBN 1-57243-809-6.
