= International Wrestling Association (1970s) =

1970s American professional wrestling promotion

- Acronym: IWA
- Founded: 1975
- Defunct: 1978
- Headquarters: Cleveland, Ohio
- Founder(s): Eddie Einhorn and Pedro Martinez
- Parent: National Wrestling Federation

The International Wrestling Association (IWA) was a professional wrestling promotion based in Cleveland, Ohio, in the 1970s. It was founded by Eddie Einhorn and Pedro Martinez in 1975. The company descended from the National Wrestling Federation. It was originally intended to be the first national wrestling promotion, but stayed primarily in the Mid-Atlantic region. Einhorn offered his wrestlers more money and benefits than competing promotions, helping to lure big names such as Mil Mascaras (the company's heavyweight champion). Einhorn left the promotion later that year, and Johnny Powers took over as booker. The company scaled down and stayed in Virginia and North Carolina. After losing an antitrust lawsuit against the rival Jim Crockett Promotions, the IWA closed in 1978.

== History ==
In the 1970s, Ron Martinez introduced his friend Eddie Einhorn to his father Pedro Martinez, and the duo established the International Wrestling Association in 1975 as a descendant company of Martinez's National Wrestling Federation. The IWA was originally intended to be the first national wrestling promotion.

Einhorn offered professional wrestler George Scott a $250,000 a year salary and percentage of the business to be his partner in the promotion, but Scott declined. To get prominent professional wrestlers such as Ernie Ladd and Mil Mascaras, the company used contracts that guaranteed money to the talent regardless of ticket sales. Einhorn also offered wrestlers deals that included transportation and lodging, in contrast to other promotions. Mascaras was one of the promotion's initial champions. He mainly feuded with Ladd over the IWA Championship. Another one of the promotion's main feuds was between Mighty Igor and Bulldog Brower. During the storyline, Brower attacked Igor on his birthday, knocking him into his birthday cake.

The IWA's early house shows featuring Mascaras were competition for Vince McMahon's World Wide Wrestling Federation (WWWF). One show at the Roosevelt Stadium featured former WWWF World Heavyweight Champion Ivan Koloff against Mascaras, drawing an attendance of 14,000. Later, the IWA shows were taped for television and aired on WOR (Channel 9) while the WWWF aired shows on Spanish-language WNJU (Channel 47). The IWA used new innovations like freeze frame shots and replays in slow motion to enhance the matches. Ron Martinez acted as booker, announcer, and producer for the television shows. Jack Reynolds and Tex McKenzie acted as play-by-play announcers, and Rick Gattone was the ring announcer. Einhorn's plan was for the show to be nationally syndicated.

Einhorn left the IWA in late 1975 due to business conflicts and a large financial loss. At that time, Tom Ficara acquired the IWA Wrestling programming for his FBC Cable Network. Subsequently, Johnny Powers became the booker for the IWA and scaled down the promotion. The company ran shows in Virginia and North Carolina for a couple of years. Ron Martinez stayed with the promotion for three years after Einhorn left. The promotion closed after an antitrust case that accused Jim Crockett, Jr. of preventing the IWA from promoting shows in the area's large arenas, including the Winston-Salem Coliseum. The case was not successful and the promotion closed in 1978.

The show was shown overseas in Nigeria and Singapore in 1978. Clips from the tape library were featured on ESPN's Cheap Seats, as well as ESPN Classic's Golden Age of Wrestling.

== Championships ==
The main championship for the company was the IWA Championship. Mil Mascaras was the champion, winning it in Savannah, Georgia, in 1975. He also defended the championship in Mexico. The exact lineage of the title is unknown, but Johnny Powers claims to have held it three times. Even after the promotion closed in 1978, Powers defended the title overseas. He last defended it against Bulldog Brower in Nigeria in 1982, after which he retired from wrestling.

The Mongols (Geeto Mongol and Bolo Mongol) were the company's only holders of the IWA Tag Team Championship. After Eddie Einhorn left the promotion, The Mongols also left, taking the IWA Tag Team Championship with them to rival Jim Crockett Promotions (JCP) in January 1976. In JCP, they were billed as the International Tag Team Champions.

The IWA North American Championship was the only title in the promotion to officially change hands. The first holder of the title was Ox Baker. He held the title for less than a year before losing it to Bulldog Brower.

Female wrestlers also had a title in the promotion, the IWA Women's North American Championship. The sole holder of the title was Estelle Molina.

=== Rights of Footage ===
In 2012, JADAT Sports Inc. bought all the footage of the International Wrestling Association from Ron's Son, Jason Martinez. The International Wrestling Association's tape library is one of the few classic wrestling tape libraries not owned by World Wrestling Entertainment and is one of several classic libraries owned by JADAT Sports Inc. In 2021 JADAT Sports Inc. appointed Stream Go Media LLC as the exclusive distribution agents for the International Wrestling Association, Detroit Big Time Wrestling, SCW and Texas All-Star Wrestling. Footage from the International Wrestling Association appear on the streaming service "Wrestling Legends Network" built and operated by Stream Go Media, LLC launched on May 25, 2021, on the Roku platform and on www.WrestlingLegendsNetwork.tv.

== See also ==
- List of independent wrestling promotions in the United States
