= Ernie Ladd =

American football player and professional wrestler (1938–2007)

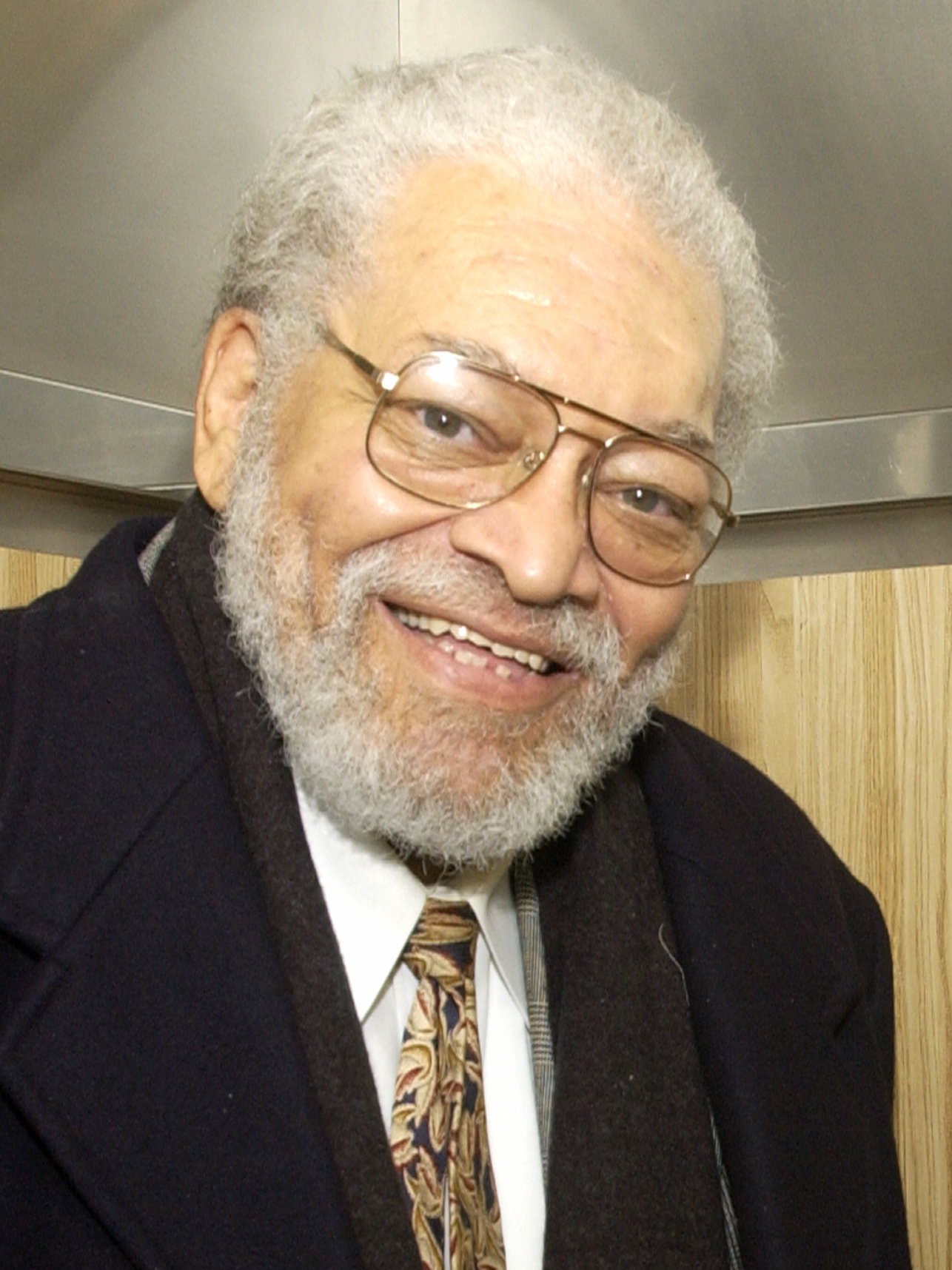
- Ladd in 2004
- Born: Ernest Ladd; November 28, 1938; Rayville, Louisiana, U.S.
- Died: March 10, 2007 (aged 68); Franklin, Louisiana, U.S.
- Education: Grambling State University
- Spouse: Roslyn Ladd
- Children: 4
- Football career

No. 77, 99
- Position: Defensive tackle

Personal information
- Listed height: 6 ft 9 in (2.06 m)
- Listed weight: 290 lb (132 kg)

Career information
- High school: Wallace (Orange, Texas)
- College: Grambling (1957–1960)
- NFL draft: 1961: 4th round, 48th overall pick
- AFL draft: 1961: 15th round, 119th overall pick

Career history
- San Diego Chargers (1961–1965); Houston Oilers (1966–1967); Kansas City Chiefs (1967–1968)

Awards and highlights
- AFL champion (1963); 3× First-team All-AFL (1961, 1964, 1965); 4× AFL All-Star (1962–1965); Los Angeles Chargers Hall of Fame; San Diego Chargers 50th Anniversary Team

Career AFL statistics
- Fumble recoveries: 2
- Interceptions: 1
- Stats at Pro Football Reference
- Professional wrestling career
- Ring name: Ernie Ladd
- Billed height: 6 ft 9 in (206 cm)
- Billed weight: 320 lb (145 kg)
- Billed from: New Orleans, Louisiana, U.S.
- Trained by: Bobo Brazil
- Debut: 1961
- Retired: 1988

Ernest L. Ladd (November 28, 1938 – March 10, 2007), nicknamed "the Big Cat", was an American professional football defensive tackle and professional wrestler. A standout athlete in high school, Ladd attended Grambling State University on a basketball scholarship before being drafted in 1961 by the San Diego Chargers of the American Football League (AFL). Ladd found success in the AFL as one of the largest players in professional football history at 6′9″ and 290 pounds. He helped the Chargers to four AFL championship games in five years, winning the championship with the team in 1963. He also had stints with the Kansas City Chiefs and Houston Oilers. Ladd took up professional wrestling during the AFL offseason, and after a knee injury ended his football career turned to it full-time in 1969.

As a professional wrestler, Ladd became one of the top heels in the business. For the majority of his career, he played a villainous character who would arrogantly taunt both opponents and crowds. Ladd feuded with many popular wrestlers of the time, including Wahoo McDaniel, André the Giant, Bobo Brazil, Dusty Rhodes, and Mr. Wrestling, and even had a heel to heel feud with Professor Toru Tanaka, before retiring from the ring in 1986.

For his American football career, Ladd was inducted into the Chargers Hall of Fame in 1981 and the Grambling State University Hall of Fame in 1989. For his professional wrestling career he was inducted into the WCW Hall of Fame in 1994, the WWF Hall of Fame in 1995, the Wrestling Observer Newsletter Hall of Fame in 1996, and the NWA Hall of Fame in 2013.

Ladd was diagnosed with colon cancer in the winter of 2003–2004, and died from the disease on March 10, 2007, at the age of 68.

== Early life ==
Ladd was born in Rayville, Louisiana, and raised in Orange, Texas by his mother Louada and stepfather James Ford. He was a high school football and basketball star at Wallace High School. His football coach at Wallace was William Ray Smith Sr., father of NFL star Bubba Smith. As a sophomore he was on Wallace's 1954 state championship football team. As a senior, he was the football team co-captain. Ladd was also an All-State basketball player who helped lead Wallace to a state championship in basketball.

== College career ==
Ladd subsequently attended Grambling State University on a basketball scholarship. He also played defensive tackle on the football team at Grambling under another legend, future College Football Hall of Fame coach Eddie Robinson. Robinson won his first Southwest Athletic Conference (SWAC) championship with Ladd on the team.

Ladd was the nephew of Grambling and Houston Oilers teammate Garland Boyette. Another teammate at Grambling and later with the Kansas City Chiefs was fellow tackle Buck Buchanan, who would go on to be considered one of the greatest professional players of all time.

In 1969, celebrating college football's centennial, the Louisiana Sportswriters Association selected Ladd to the Louisiana Collegiate All-Time Football Team, along with Boyette and Buchanan, among others.

== Professional football career ==
Ladd was drafted 48th overall in the fourth round of the 1961 NFL draft by the Chicago Bears. He was also taken by the American Football League's San Diego Chargers with their 15th pick (119th overall) in the 1961 AFL draft. He chose to sign with the Chargers. He started all 14 games at right defensive tackle in his rookie season. The Chargers were 12–2, going to the AFL championship game against the Houston Oilers (losing 10–3). As a rookie, Ladd was selected first-team All-AFL by The Sporting News, the Associated Press (AP) and United Press International (UPI), as was fellow rookie defensive linemate Earl Faison.

The Chargers fell to 4–10 in 1962. Ladd started 13 games at right defensive tackle, with a team-high 9.5 quarterback sacks. In 1963, he started only two games, with three sacks. The Chargers were 11–3 that season, and went on to win the 1963 AFL championship, 51–10 over the Boston Patriots. Ladd had a sack in the championship game. In 1964, he spent time on the injured deferred list with an ankle injury. He started nine games at right tackle that season, with three sacks. In 1965, he started all 14 games for the first time since his rookie season, with six sacks.

During Ladd's five-year Chargers' career (1961 to 1965), the Chargers played in four AFL championship games, winning the American Football League title in 1963. He played all of those seasons on the same line as All-AFL and AFL All-Star left defensive end Faison, both being members of a defensive line labelled the Fearsome Foursome. After both Ladd and Faison left the team after 1965 season, the Chargers were not in another championship game until the 1980 American Football Conference championship game.

Although Ladd found success with the Chargers, he had a contentious relationship with the Chargers front office. He started the 1965 season being indefinitely suspended from the team by Coach/General Manager Sid Gillman.

Ladd stated he and teammate Earl Faison would play out their contract options, opting to take a 10 percent cut in salary in exchange for becoming free agents at the end of the season. A planned trade with the Oilers in early 1966 would have sent Faison and Ladd to Houston. However, both were declared free agents by AFL commissioner Joe Foss, who ruled Oilers owner Bud Adams had tampered in trade dealings with the Chargers. Ladd refused to re-sign with the Chargers and suggested he might instead turn to professional wrestling full-time.

Eventually, Ladd signed with the Oilers and spent the 1966 season playing for them before moving in 1967 to the Kansas City Chiefs. There, with similarly king sized Grambling teammate and future Pro Football Hall of Famer Buck Buchanan (6 ft 7 in, 286 lbs), he filled out what was probably the biggest defensive tackle tandem in history.

== Legacy and honors ==
Ladd was one of the AFL players that organized a walkout on the 1965 AFL All-Star Game due to the racism they experienced in New Orleans.

At 6 ft 9 in (2.06 m) and 290 pounds (131.5 kg), Ladd was said to be the biggest and strongest man in professional football during his era. His physical measurements included a 52-inch chest, 39-inch waist, 20-inch biceps, 19-inch neck, and size 18D shoes. Boston Patriots center Jon Morris said Ladd was so big "It was dark. I couldn't see the linebackers. I couldn't see the goalposts. It was like being locked in a closet".

In 1981, Ladd was inducted into the Chargers Hall of Fame. Both Ladd and Buchanan were inducted into the Grambling State University Athletic Hall of Fame. He is a member of the Museum of the Gulf Coast Sports Hall of Fame.

Ladd played in 112 consecutive games. He was selected to play in the AFL All-Star Game from 1962 to 1965. In addition to his All-AFL selections in 1961, in 1963, the Newspaper Enterprise Association (NEA) named him second-team All-AFL. In 1964 and 1965, the NEA, Associated Press (AP) and United Press International (UPI) all selected Ladd first-team All-AFL. The Sporting News also named him first-team All-AFL in 1965. Faison was also first-team All-AFL in 1964 and 1965.

== Professional wrestling career ==
Ladd started wrestling in 1961. As a publicity stunt, some wrestlers in the San Diego area challenged Ladd to a private wrestling workout. Before long, Ladd was a part-time competitor in Los Angeles, during football's off-season. Ladd became a huge draw in short order. When knee problems cut his football career short, Ladd turned to the more financially lucrative business of wrestling full-time in 1969. Ladd also said he could have continued playing football, but wrestling was more lucrative. He made $98,000 his first full year wrestling, and over $100,000/year after that, and "That was big money back in the '60s.'"

After a run as a fan favorite, Ladd became one of wrestling's most hated heels during the 1970s, as well as one of the first black wrestlers to portray a heel character. It was Ladd's idea to become a heel. He riled crowds with his arrogant and colorful demeanor during interviews, especially with his derogatory nicknames for opponents such as Wahoo McDaniel (whom he referred to as "the Drunken Indian"), and Mr. Wrestling (whom he called "the Masked Varmint" and insisted he was an escaped criminal). Ladd also controversially employed a taped thumb, claiming the support was needed due to an old football injury. Often when Ladd appeared to be in serious trouble during a match, he would walk out of the arena and accept a countout loss, known since as "pulling an Ernie Ladd".

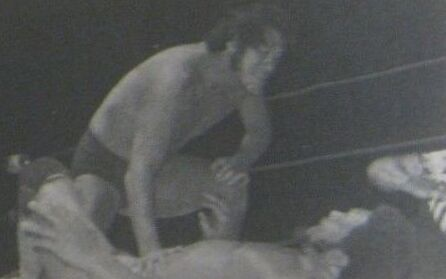
Ernie Ladd (bottom) facing Antonio Inoki in June 1975

Ladd wrestled for a number of different professional associations, including the World Wide Wrestling Federation numerous times from 1968 to 1981. Additionally, he had several successful runs in the NWA territories, The Mid-South promotion, NWF, and WWC promotion.

Known for his immense size and power, it was a natural for Ladd to engage in feuds with other giants, including famously with André the Giant (whom Ladd antagonizingly referred to as "Andre the Dummy" or "The Big Fat French Fry" during interviews).

In certain areas, Ladd's wrestling nickname was "The King", and he would wear an ornate crown. In other wrestling associations, he was "The Big Cat", and entered wearing a big cowboy hat.

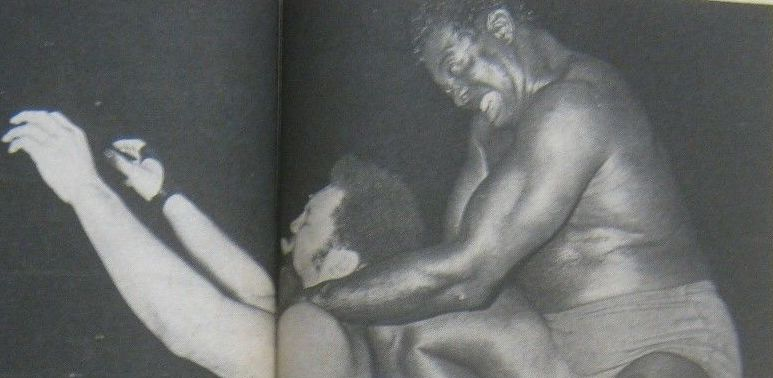
Ernie Ladd (left) facing Bobo Brazil in June 1975

After handily pinning Earl "Mr. Universe" Maynard the month prior, Ladd challenged Bruno Sammartino at Madison Square Garden for the WWWF title on March 1, 1976. In 1978, he wrestled WWWF champion Bob Backlund. When the International Wrestling Association had its brief run in the New York area, Ladd lost a two out of three falls match at Roosevelt Stadium, in Jersey City, New Jersey, to champion Mil Mascaras, two falls to one (he pinned Mascaras the first fall, was disqualified in the second, and was pinned by Mascaras in the third).

After leaving the WWWF, Ladd ventured to the Mid-South territory promoted by Bill Watts. While there, Ladd feuded with Paul Orndorff, Ray Candy, and Junkyard Dog. He also served as a manager to Afa and Sika, The Wild Samoans. Ladd also had a decent run as part of a tag team with "Bad" Leroy Brown in the early 1980s. Ladd also assisted Watts as a booker behind the scenes and had a large part in the development of Sylvester Ritter as the area's top draw.

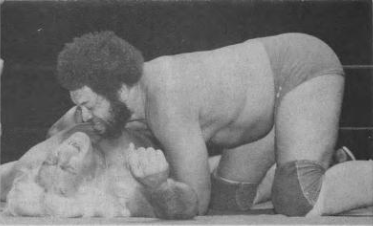
Ladd (right) in a 1981 match against Ric Flair

Ladd retired from wrestling in 1986 due to recurring knee problems. He then returned to the WWF as a color commentator, calling the 20-man battle royal at Wrestlemania 2 (which featured NFL players) and then earning a trial run doing commentary for various shows, including the April 1986 show at Madison Square Garden. He was also used as a fill-in for matches on syndicated programming such as WWF Championship Wrestling. Ladd also teamed with Gorilla Monsoon and Johnny Valiant in the broadcast booth during The Big Event at C.N.E. Stadium in Toronto, Ontario. Ladd, Monsoon, and Valiant were the original three-man team for the first few weeks of WWF Wrestling Challenge, before Ladd was replaced by Bobby Heenan and Valiant's role was reduced significantly to only calling matches when Heenan had to be at ringside for one of the wrestlers he managed. Following this, Ladd quietly left the WWF.

He wrestled one more match on January 3, 1988, at a WWF house show in Long Island, New York in a 20-man battle royal won by Bam Bam Bigelow.

He was inducted into the WCW Hall of Fame in 1994 and the WWF Hall of Fame class of 1995, becoming the first (and for several years only) inductee in both halls.

== Later life ==
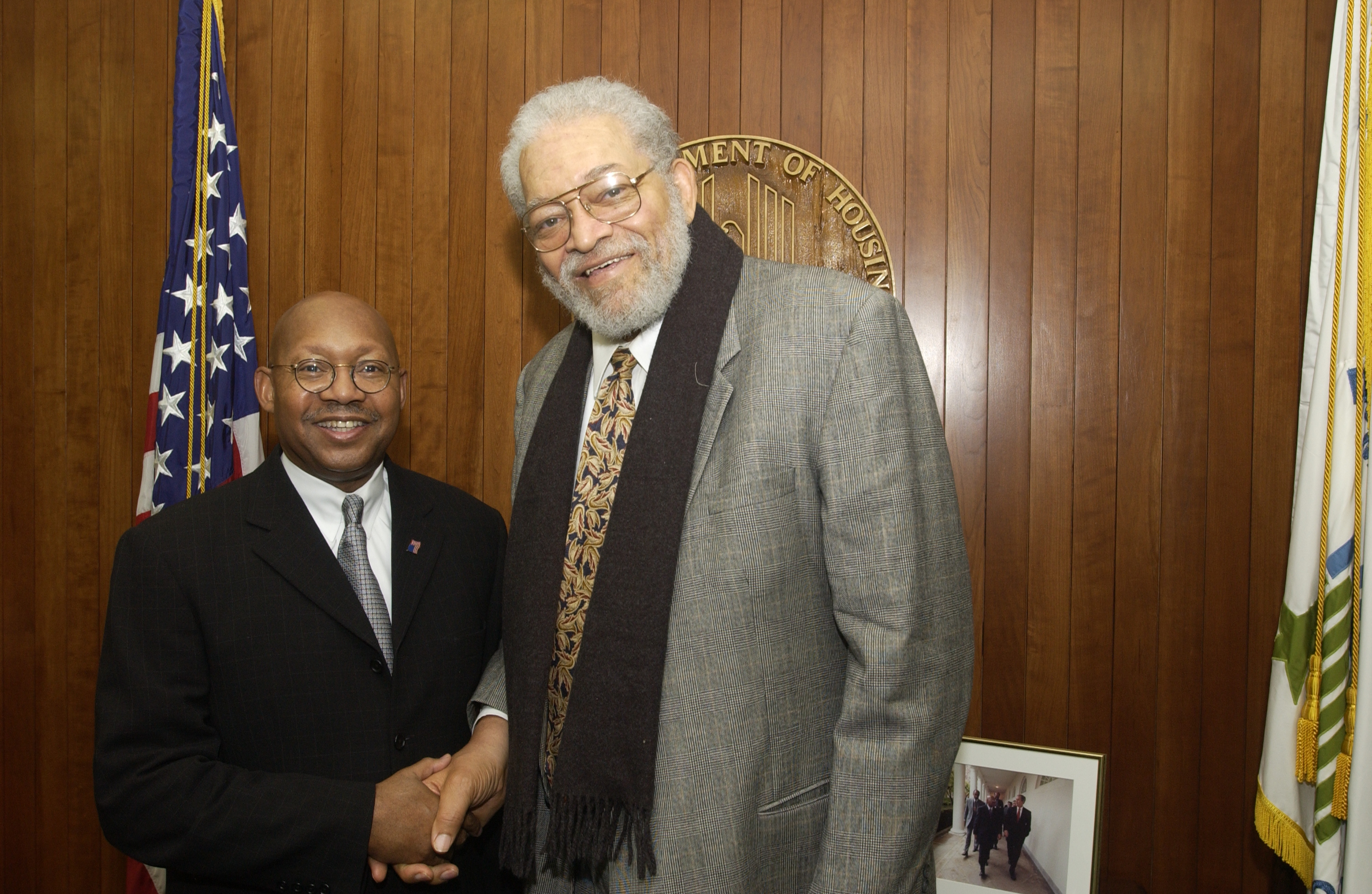
Ladd with secretary Alphonso Jackson

Ladd was a longtime friend of the Bush family and supported the 2000 campaign of George W. Bush. Ladd also owned and operated Big Cat Ernie Ladd's "Throwdown" BBQ Restaurant in New Orleans, Louisiana, until it was destroyed by Hurricane Katrina on August 29, 2005. In the disaster's aftermath, he ministered to Katrina evacuees at the Astrodome. He was a friend of WWE Hall of Fame commentator Jim Ross. Ladd also appeared in an episode of That '70s Show entitled "That Wrestling Show." He was in the locker room with The Rock, who was playing his own father "Soul Man" Rocky Johnson. Ladd was also a basketball coach for young kids in Franklin, Louisiana.

== Death ==
Ladd was diagnosed with colon cancer in the winter of 2003–2004, being advised he had three to six months to live. He reportedly ignored the doctor's diagnosis, stating "The doctor told me I had three to six months to live…I told the doctor that he's a liar and that Dr. Jesus has got the verdict on me! I also told him, 'You're working with a miracle when you work with me." The cancer eventually spread to his stomach and bones, and three years passed before he died on March 10, 2007, at the age of 68.

== Championships and accomplishments ==
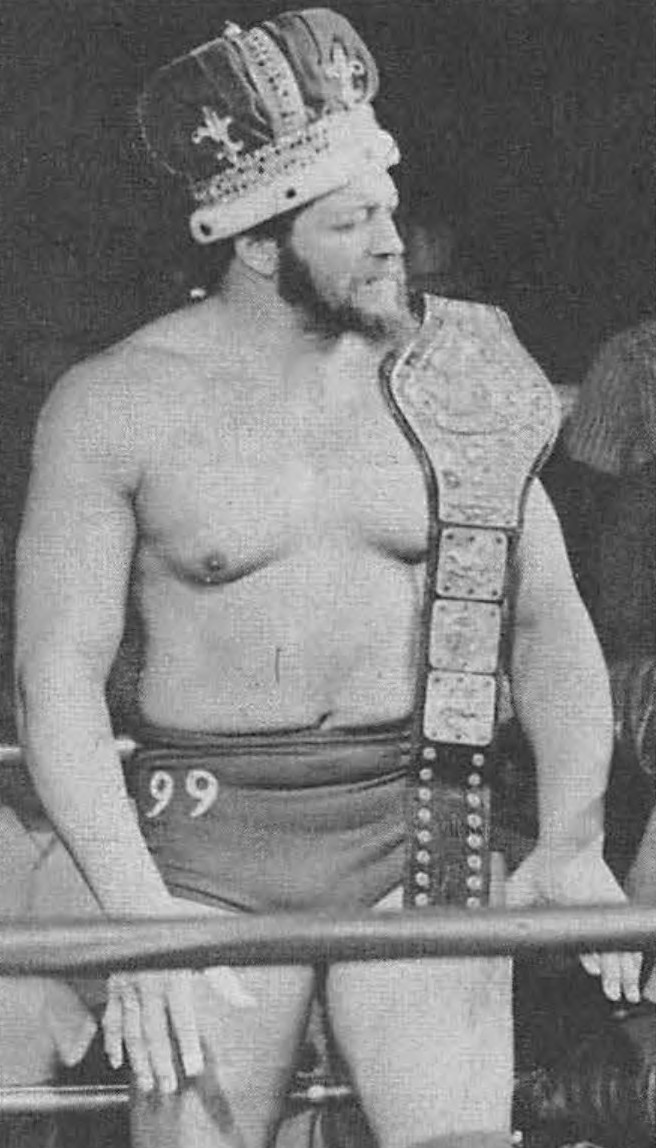
Ladd with a championship, circa 1979

- Cauliflower Alley Club
  - Other honoree (2005)
- Central States Wrestling
  - NWA Central States Tag Team Championship (1 time) – with Bruiser Brody
- Championship Wrestling from Florida
  - NWA Florida Heavyweight Championship (1 time)
  - NWA Southern Heavyweight Championship (Florida version) (1 time)
- Georgia Championship Wrestling
  - NWA Georgia Tag Team Championship (1 time) – with Ole Anderson
- Hollywood Wrestling / Worldwide Wrestling Associates
  - NWA Americas Heavyweight Championship (3 times)
  - WWA International Television Tag Team Championship (1 time) – with Edouard Carpentier
  - WWA World Tag Team Championship (1 time) – with Edouard Carpentier
- National Wrestling Alliance
  - NWA Hall of Fame (Class of 2013)
- National Wrestling Federation
  - NWF Brass Knuckles Championship (1 time)
  - NWF Heavyweight Championship (1 time)
  - NWF North American Heavyweight Championship (6 times)
- NWA Big Time Wrestling
  - NWA American Heavyweight Championship (1 time)
  - NWA Brass Knuckles Championship (Texas version) (1 time)
  - NWA Texas Heavyweight Championship (1 time)
- NWA Tri-State / Mid-South Wrestling Association
  - Mid-South Louisiana Heavyweight Championship (2 times)
  - Mid-South North American Heavyweight Championship (1 time)
  - Mid-South Tag Team Championship (2 times) – with Leroy Brown
  - NWA Arkansas Heavyweight Championship (1 time)
  - NWA North American Heavyweight Championship (Tri-State version) (5 times)
  - NWA United States Tag Team Championship (Tri-State version) (1 time) – with The Assassin
- Pro Wrestling Illustrated
  - PWI ranked him # 205 of the 500 best singles wrestlers during the "PWI Years" in 2003.
- Professional Wrestling Hall of Fame
  - Class of 2018
- Southern California Pro-Wrestling Hall of Fame
  - Inducted 2020
- World Championship Wrestling
  - WCW Hall of Fame (Class of 1994)
- World Wrestling Association
  - WWA World Heavyweight Championship (1 time)
  - WWA World Tag Team Championship (1 time) – with Baron von Raschke
- World Wrestling Council
  - WWC North American Heavyweight Championship (1 time)
- World Wrestling Federation
  - WWF Hall of Fame (Class of 1995)
- Wrestling Observer Newsletter
  - Wrestling Observer Newsletter Hall of Fame (Class of 1996)

== See also ==
- List of American Football League players
- List of gridiron football players who became professional wrestlers
