= National Wrestling Federation =

U.S. professional wrestling promotion

- Acronym: NWF
- Founded: 1970 (first run); 1986 (second run)
- Defunct: 1974 (first run); 1994 (second run)
- Style: American Wrestling
- Headquarters: Buffalo, New York (1970–1974); Cleveland, Ohio (1970–1974); Philadelphia, Pennsylvania (1986–1994); New York City, New York (1986–1994)
- Founder(s): Pedro Martínez (1970); Robert Raskin (1986)
- Owner(s): Pedro Martínez (1970–1974); Johnny Powers (1970–1974); Robert Raskin (1986–1994)
- Sister: Lutte Internationale

The National Wrestling Federation (NWF) was a professional wrestling promotion based in Buffalo, New York and owned by promoter Pedro Martinez. It ran from 1970 to 1974. The promotion was then revived in 1986 by Robert Raskin. The revived promotion closed in 1994.

== History ==
Pedro Martínez (no relation to the baseball player) owned the original National Wrestling Federation, which operated from 1970 to 1974. The NWF Heavyweight Championship and NWF North American Heavyweight Championship were later used by New Japan Pro-Wrestling as its main titles until 1981.

During the original version of the NWF, popular performers included Johnny Powers, Ernie Ladd, Waldo Von Erich, Chief White Owl, Hans Schmidt, the Mighty Igor, Luis Martinez, Ron Sanders, Dusty Rhodes, Tony Parisi, Tony Marino, the Stomper, Ben Justice, the Love Brothers, Dick the Bruiser, Blackjack Lanza, Dr. Moto, Mitsu Arakawa, and Bulldog Brower. Championship Wrestling aired on Channel 43 in Cleveland on Saturday nights. Briefly a second show, All-Star Wrestling, aired on Sunday Mornings. That show was filmed in the studios of WUAB-TV in Parma, Ohio. The television hosts were Johnny Powers, Jack Reynolds, and Ron Martinez (son of Pedro Martinez). The film from each show was erased and reused to save money, hence few of the shows are available now on video or YouTube.

In 1986, Robert Raskin (President of Raskin Sports Productions and a former professional basketball coach for the ABA) purchased the Allentown, Pennsylvania-based Continental Wrestling Alliance from D. C. Drake and renamed it the National Wrestling Federation. The organization created a version of the NWF World Heavyweight Championship and created an NWF Women's Championship. Under the direction of Raskin, the National Wrestling Federation grew rapidly. Using wrestlers who were formerly under contract with the World Wrestling Federation and the National Wrestling Alliance, Raskin spared no expense in making the product a watchable alternative to the wrestling shows which were currently on television. Drake, who was the champion, also headed up the booking and television production ends of the business. Raskin felt that the NWF should move the television tapings from the Easton, PA VFW Hall to various locations around the east coast. Matches were taped at arenas in Pennsylvania, New Jersey, New York, and other locations. Raskin also hired a young Paul Heyman (who later became Paul E. Dangerously) to handle color commentary on the TV show.

Drake and Raskin also decided to put more emphasis on the NWF Women's Division. As the women's division became established, Wendi Richter (who along with Cyndi Lauper helped the WWF bring attention to ladies wrestling once again) was defeated in a questionable fashion in Madison Square Garden by The Fabulous Moolah and left the organization. She entered the NWF and quickly captured the title from Heidi Lee Morgan. The revived NWF also placed a major emphasis on hardcore wrestling, including many specialty matches such as Indian strap matches, dog collar matches, and steel cage matches (including one of the first women's steel cage matches in the United States, featuring Richter and Morgan).

On February 28, 1991, Raskin promoted a supercard at the Peace and Friendship Stadium, as part of a one-night NWF tour of Athens, Greece. The event featured a co-main event with Abdullah the Butcher vs. Chief Jules Strongbow and Greek Heavyweight Champion Sugloukis defending his title against The Russian Assassin. Seen by 5,500 fans, it was the most attended show by an independent promotion for that year. It was also the first time in ten years that American wrestlers had visited Greece.

Raskin, seeing the organization expand, merged with Creative Entertainment, a sports and entertainment promotional organization from Philadelphia. This move proved to be a smart one as Creative Entertainment was able to book matches for the NWF across the country. The television show expanded to Sports Channels and broadcast stations across the country and appeared in foreign markets in Europe, South and Central America and Asia. As the company grew, creative differences began to split the organization and several in the front office left to pursue other ventures. As the capital investment stopped, the television product was halted. The promotion closed in 1994.

== Championships ==
1970–1974:

- NWF Heavyweight Championship
- NWF North American Heavyweight Championship
- NWF World Tag Team Championship
- NWF Penn-Can Television Championship
- NWF Canadian Tag Team Championship – First and only champions were Fidel Castillo and Roul Castillo, who won the championship in 1972.
- NWF Brass Knuckles Championship – First and only champion was Ernie Ladd, defeating Luke Graham on May 18, 1972 in Cleveland, Ohio.
- NWF World Junior Heavyweight Championship – First and only champion was Raymond Rougeau, defeating Hartford Love on May 5, 1973 in Cleveland, Ohio.

1986–1994:

- NWF World Heavyweight Championship
- NWF International Championship – First champion was Abdullah the Butcher, who won the championship in May 1987. He lost the championship to Bruiser Brody in October 1987.
- NWF/NWFGL Penn-Can Television Championship; One of two championships carried over from the previous incarnation.
- NWF Women's Championship – First and only champion was Wendi Richter, defeating Heidi Lee Morgan on June 20, 1987 in Bricktown, New Jersey.
- NWF Tag Team Championship – First and only champions were The Executioners (Jerry Fazio and Terry Manton), who won the championship in August 1986.
