= Buddy Wolfe =

American professional wrestler

Personal information
- Born: Leslie Charles Wolff; April 11, 1941 Blue Earth, Minnesota, U.S.
- Died: July 11, 2017 (aged 76) Hackensack, Minnesota, U.S.
- Spouse: Vivian Vachon (m. 1976; div. 1979)
- Children: 2

Professional wrestling career
- Ring name(s): Buddy Wolff; Spoiler #2
- Billed height: 6 ft 1 in (1.85 m)
- Billed weight: 260 lb (118 kg)
- Trained by: Verne Gagne
- Debut: 1968
- Retired: 1988

Leslie Charles Wolff (April 11, 1941 – July 11, 2017) was an American football player and professional wrestler, known by his ring name "Beautiful" Buddy Wolfe, who competed in North American regional promotions including the American Wrestling Association, National Wrestling Alliance and the World Wide Wrestling Federation during the 1970s and 80s.

Wolff found his greatest success as the tag team partner of Don Jardine wrestling as the second incarnation of The Spoilers in the Tri-State territory. He was one of several men to team with Jardine as Spoiler #2, twice winning the NWA United States Tag Team Championship during the early 1970s.

Wolff later formed a tag team with "Luscious" Larry Heinimi, who together were considered one of the top "heel" tag teams in the Midwest United States during the mid-1970s.

== Professional wrestling career ==
=== Early career ===
Trained by wrestler Verne Gagne, Wolff was one of several students to debut during the early 1970s including Ricky "The Dragon" Steamboat, "Nature Boy" Ric Flair and Pacific Northwest Wrestling mainstay "Playboy" Buddy Rose, whom he would become a mentor to during his early career. In one of his earliest matches, he lost to his future brother-in-law Maurice "Mad Dog" Vachon in Fargo, North Dakota on December 20, 1970.

=== From Atlanta to Texas ===
He spent his first years in Mid-Atlantic Championship Wrestling feuding with fellow Minnesota State alumni Ole and Lars Anderson. Wolff dominated his feud with Ole Anderson and, to further the storyline, a real-life incident in which Ole Anderson broke his nose while the two attended college was often referenced by Anderson who frequently claimed that Wolff was trying to end his wrestling career.

During mid-1971, Wolff wrestled in the Dallas-area for promoter Jack Adkisson. On July 20, he and Bronko Lubich fought Nick Kozak and Johnny Valentine to a draw at The Sportatorium. Later single matches against Bobby Shane and Johnny Valentine also resulted in draws. He scored one of his earliest victories when he defeated The Great Scott on August 10, however this was followed by a defeat in an 8-man tag team match with Bronko Lubich, Toru Tanaka and Skandor Akbar losing to Nick Kozak & Johnny Valentine, Rey Mendoza and Jose Lothario on August 17. He continued feuding with Kozak and Valentine, fighting to a draw with Kozak on August 31 and defeating Valentine on September 7. The following week, he lost to Wahoo McDaniel in a best 2-of-3 pinfalls match. On September 21, he teamed with Toru Tanaka and Thunderbolt Patterson in a 6-man tag team match losing to Johnny Valentine, Jose Lothario and Fritz von Erich. He faced Paterson and Valentine in a three-way elimination match with Valentine defeating pinning Patterson and himself on September 28. Although the Dallas Morning News reported that this match was the first "3-man free-for-all wrestling match" held in Dallas, this statement in inaccurate.

On October 5, he teamed with Lubich, Patterson, Tanaka and George Hultz in a 10-man tag team match losing to Kozak, Valentine, Jose Lothario, Sabu Singh and Bobby Burns. He defeated Burns in a singles match later that night. In another best 2-of-3 falls match, he teamed with Wahoo McDaniel and lost to Thunderbolt Patterson and Toru Tanaka on October 26. In the following weeks, he faced Toru Tanaka, Patterson and Joe Dusek. He fought his last match in the promotion fighting former tag team partner Bronko Lubich on December 14, 1971.

=== World Wide Wrestling Federation (1972–1973) ===
In late 1972, Wolff began competing in the World Wide Wrestling Federation. He defeated Blackjack Slade in his debut match at Madison Square Garden on October 16, 1972. He defeated El Olympico but lost to Chief Jay Strongbow and Tony Garea during the next few weeks. He also faced his old trainer Verne Gagne at Madison Square Garden on November 27. The next month, he defeated Sonny King but lost to Victor Rivera via disqualification on December 29.

The following year, he faced then WWWF World Heavyweight Champion Pedro Morales at the Westchester Civic Center in White Plains, New York on January 24, 1973. He would be the first of several major opponents to challenge Morales for the title that year. Three days later, substituting for Prof. Toru Tanaka, he faced Chief Jay Strongbow at Sunnyside Gardens in Queens, New York. Later that day, he teamed with Moondog Mayne and King Curtis in a 6-man tag team match against Pedro Morales, Chief Jay Strongbow and Gorilla Monsoon in Philadelphia, Pennsylvania on January 27.

On February 10, he would score his first victory defeating Mike Conrad and would face Pedro Morales in several matches during the year. Teaming with Prof. Toru Tanaka & Mr. Fuji losing to Pedro Morales, Gorilla Monsoon and Bobo Brazil at the Baltimore Civic Center in Baltimore, Maryland on February 20 and again faced Morales in a singles match at the Zembo Mosque in Harrisburg, Pennsylvania on February 23. During the match, Wolfe sustained a serious head wound after hitting one of the turnbuckles and the referee stopped the match.

He would also face Mil Máscaras and Lee Wong during the next several weeks before losing to Pedro Morales in a Texas Death match on March 16 and, the following night, teamed with Moondog Mayne and Toru Tanaka in a 6-man tag team match against Gorilla Monsoon, Sonny King and El Olympico. On March 26, he lost to André the Giant in his debut match at Madison Square Garden on March 26 and to Pedro Morales in New London, Connecticut on April 13.

He again faced Morales on April 21, during which time the match was again stopped by the referee due to a serious wound being sustained. He and Frank Valois faced André the Giant in a handicap match in Augusta, Maine on April 26 as well as facing Gorilla Monsoon and "Classie" Freddie Blassie before leaving the promotion in late April 1973.

=== American Wrestling Association & National Wrestling Alliance (1973–1978) ===
Later that year, he and Lars Anderson (under the name "Luscious" Larry Heinimi) began teaming together and billed as "cousins" although this was kayfabe. While in the Midwest, they were one of the top tag teams in the World Wrestling Association. They also had successful runs in the American Wrestling Association and in the Tri-State territory. For a brief time in the mid-1970s, he and Anderson owned and operated a chain of "shirt shacks" selling tie-dye shirts.

Wolff also traveled to Japan along with Ric Flair, Skandor Akbar and The Outlaws (Dick Murdoch & Dusty Rhodes) and toured with Isao Yoshihara's International Wrestling Enterprise promotion from June 18 to July 15, 1973. The next year, he made an appearance for Verne Gagne's American Wrestling Association fighting Greg Gagne to a time limit draw at Comiskey Park in Chicago, Illinois on September 7, 1974.

After Anderson lost a retirement match to Billy Robinson forcing him to leave the AWA, Wolff announced he had found a new tag team partner Kim Duk. He and Kim Duk had a brief but memorable run as a tag team, however they were ultimately unsuccessful in winning the AWA World Tag Team Championship and split up soon after. In one of their last appearances as a team, they lost to Greg Gagne & Jim Brunzell at the Omaha Civic Auditorium on August 19, 1975.

In October, while in NWA Texas, he scored victories over Red Bastien, Abe Jacobs and Bruiser Blackwell before fighting to a draw against NWA Texas Heavyweight Champion Al Madril in Dallas, Texas on October 28. The next night, he and John Tolos lost a tag team match to André the Giant and Jose Lothario in San Antonio. On November 3, he defeated Al Madril for the NWA Texas Heavyweight Championship. He successfully defended the title against Tony Atlas and in rematches with Al Madrill before he losing to John Tolos later that month.

In June 1976, he was a wrestling sparring partner for Muhammad Ali and later faced him in an exhibition match at an AWA event in Chicago. At the time, Ali was preparing for his match against Japanese wrestler Antonio Inoki. He was also a sparring partner for Kenny Jay. The next month he lost to Moose Cholak at Comiskey Park in Chicago, Illinois on August 27, 1976. Later that year, he traveled to Japan where he faced Abdullah the Butcher in a rare meeting.

While in NWA Florida, he teamed with Superstar Billy Graham and Steve Strong against Rhodes, Jack and Jerry Brisco at North Dade Jr. College in Miami on January 12, 1977. He also defeated Steve Keirn in a tournament final to win the vacant NWA Florida Heavyweight Championship in March before losing it to Dusty Rhodes three months later. The following year, he and Killer Karl Kox feuded with Rhodes and Wahoo McDaniel in Florida Championship Wrestling facing them in several tag team matches. Teaming with Ric Flair and Ox Baker, Wolfe lost to André the Giant and Dick the Bruiser in a three-on-two handicap match in St. Louis, Missouri on March 17, 1978.

=== Later career and retirement (1983–1988) ===
He defeated Lars Anderson for the WWL Heavyweight Championship in Joplin, Missouri on January 18, 1983. After this point, Wolff began to slow down making brief appearances in various regional territories. He teamed with Ken Timbs against Tojo Yamamoto & Johnny Wilhoit at the Mid-South Coliseum in Memphis, Tennessee on July 16, 1984.

He eventually returned to the AWA where he spent the last years of his career. At the supercard Brawl in St. Paul, Wolff fought Buck Zumhofe to a time limit draw at St. Paul Civic Center in St. Paul, Minnesota on December 25, 1986. The following year at SuperClash II, with Doug Somers & "Mr. Magnificent" Kevin Kelly, Wolff lost to Ray Stevens and The Midnight Rockers (Shawn Michaels & Marty Jannetty) in a 6-man tag team match at the Cow Palace in San Francisco, California on May 2, 1987.

== Personal life ==
Wolff played football in high school and college, later attending St. Cloud State College, prior to becoming a former defensive end for the Norfolk Neptunes. He was voted Rookie of the Year during his first year in the Continental Football League but left the organization in 1968 to pursue a career in professional wrestling.

He was also the husband of Vivian Vachon, a popular French-Canadian female wrestler and member of the famous Vachon wrestling family, to whom he was married from 1976 to 1979. He also had two daughters, Lisa and Ann, from his first marriage.

Following his retirement, he eventually moved to Hackensack, Minnesota and formed a company, Banner Saver Pro 2000, which manufactures special custom brackets to keep banners from falling off signs in strong winds. He came up with the idea while watching the 2002 Winter Olympics and saw some of the banners being blown off signs.

In 2003, he made a public appearance with the Vachon brothers at the 2003 Cauliflower Alley Club Banquet & Reunion in Las Vegas, Nevada from April 4–6, 2003. At the event, he gave a speech.

== Death ==
On July 11, 2017, Wolff's daughter Lisa Wolff Clausen posted on her Facebook page that Wolfe had died. Minnesota historian and decades-long friend George Schire afterwards stated that Wolfe had been battling dementia in recent years. His brain will be donated to Boston University.

== Championships and accomplishments ==
- American Wrestling Association
  - AWA Midwest Heavyweight Championship (2 times)
- Championship Wrestling from Florida
  - NWA Florida Heavyweight Championship (1 time)
- NWA Tri-State
  - NWA United States Tag Team Championship (Tri-State version) (2 times) – with The Spoiler
- NWA Big-Time Wrestling
  - NWA Texas Heavyweight Championship (1 time)
