= Vachon (disambiguation) =

Vachon is a surname.

Vachon may also refer to:

- Vachon (electoral district), a provincial riding in Quebec
- Vachon River, a river in Nunavik, Quebec, Canada
- Vachon family, a Canadian pro-wrestling family
- The Vachon Brothers, a pro-wrestling tag team
- Vachon Bakery, Canadian maker of snack pastries
- Father Vachon School, Pacific Heights, Saskatoon, Saskatchewan, Canada
- Vachon Gallery, Seattle University, First Hill, Seattle, Washington State, USA; see List of museums in Seattle
