= Vachon =

Vachon is a surname.

== Persons ==
Notable people with the surname include:

- members of the Canadian professional wrestling Vachon family:
  - Luna Vachon (1962–2010), ring name of professional wrestler Gertrude Vachon
  - Maurice Vachon (1929–2013), Canadian professional wrestler, known by his ring name "Mad Dog" Vachon
  - Paul Vachon (1938–2024), Canadian professional wrestler
  - Vivian Vachon (1951–1991), female professional wrestler
- Auguste Vachon, Canadian officer of arms
- Christine Vachon (born 1962), American movie producer
- Florian Vachon (born 1985), French professional road bicycle racer
- François Vachon de Belmont (1645–1732), fifth superior of the Montreal Sulpicians
- Ian Vachon, American football player
- Jean Vachon (1903–1989), American silent film actress
- John Vachon (1914–1975), American photographer
- Louis-Albert Vachon (1912–2006), cardinal of the Roman Catholic Church, and Archbishop Emeritus of Quebec
- Nicholas Vachon (born 1972), Canadian ice hockey player
- Pierre Vachon (1738–1803), French classical composer
- Reginald I. Vachon (1937–2020), American mechanical engineer
- Rogatien Vachon (born 1945), Canadian ice hockey goaltender
- Stéphanie Vachon, Quebec politician

== Characters ==
- Mme. Vachon (French: Mrs. Vachon), a fictional character from the 2003 film Who Killed Bambi? (2003 film)
