= Robert Orton =

Robert Orton is the name of:

- Bob Orton (1929–2006), American professional wrestler
- Bob Orton Jr. (born 1950), American professional wrestler and son of Bob Orton, Sr.
- Robert Orton (audio engineer) (born 1978), audio engineer
