= Mighty Igor =

American professional wrestler

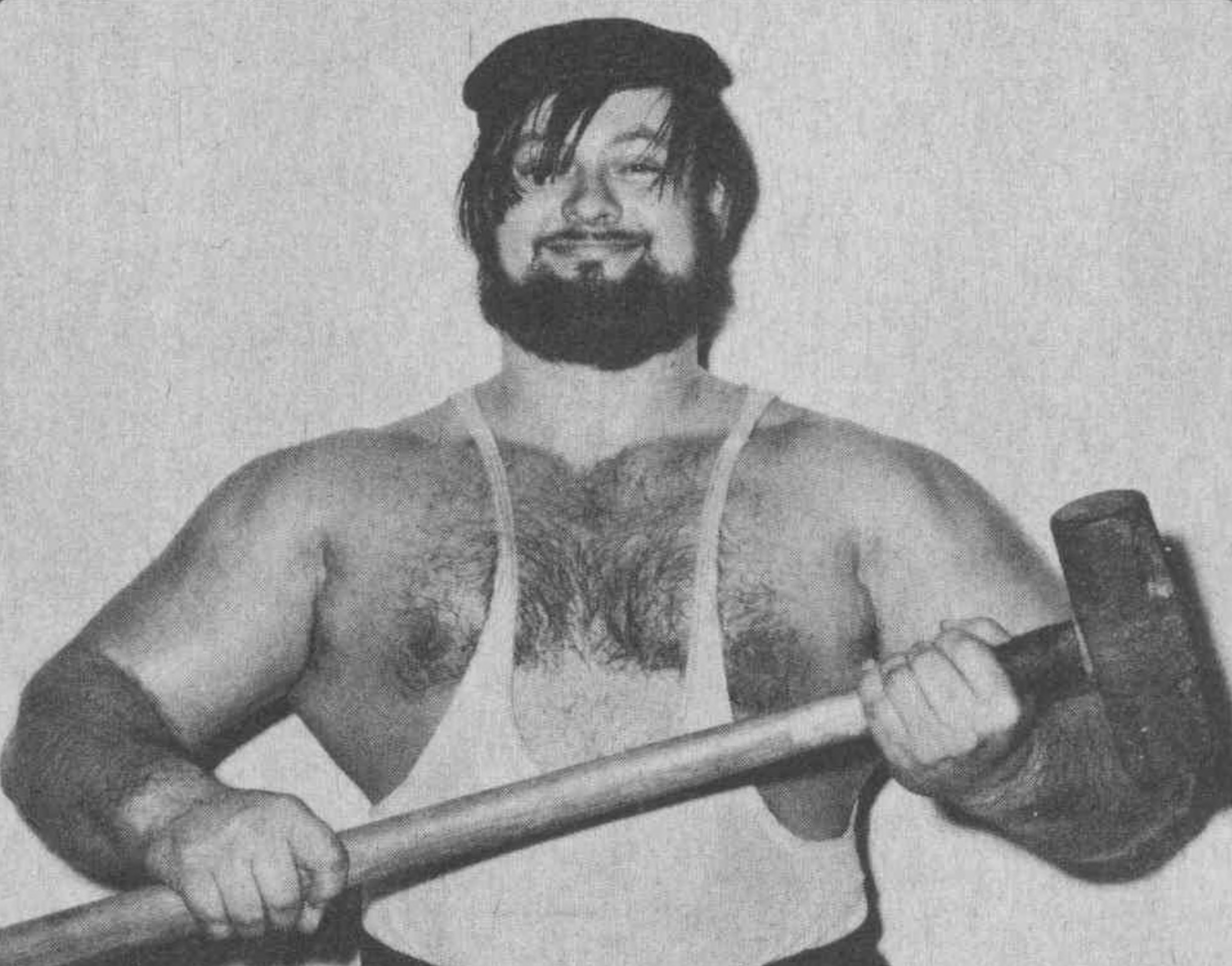
- Mighty Igor, circa 1973

Personal information
- Born: Richard Joseph Garza; July 16, 1931 Dearborn, Michigan
- Died: January 7, 2002 (aged 70) Detroit, Michigan

Professional wrestling career
- Ring name(s): Dick Garza; Johnny Bruce; Mighty Igor; Mighty Igor Vodik; Strong Man Igor; World's Strongest Wrestler
- Billed height: 6 ft 2 in (1.88 m)
- Billed weight: 289 lb (131 kg)
- Billed from: Dearborn, Michigan; Russia
- Debut: 1957
- Retired: 1988

Richard Joseph "Dick" Garza (July 16, 1931 – January 7, 2002), better known as Mighty Igor Vodik, or simply Mighty Igor, was an American professional wrestler. He is a one-time American Wrestling Association World champion. As Mighty Igor, he was frequently billed as the "World's Strongest Wrestler".

== Early years ==
Garza grew up in Michigan and competed in bodybuilding contests. He won the Mr. Michigan title in 1954 before competing in Mr. America and Mr. Universe competitions. At a gym, Garza got into an argument with professional wrestler Brute Bernard and knocked him unconscious. This gained him the interest of wrestling promoter Bert Ruby, who convinced him to enter professional wrestling.

== Professional wrestling career ==
Garza wrestled in Michigan and Ohio during his early career. He competed for a promotion named Wolverine Wrestling, where he won his first title, the Wolverine Wrestling Mid-West Heavyweight Championship, on February 14, 1957. He also competed in California, where he won the Los Angeles version of the WWA International Television Tag Team Championship in 1962 while teaming with Eric Rommel.

Garza later joined the American Wrestling Association (AWA), where he was given the ring name Mighty Igor Vodik by Verne Gagne. On May 15, 1965, he won the AWA World Heavyweight Championship by defeating Mad Dog Vachon. He held the title belt for one week before dropping it back to Vachon. In 1965 and 1966, Vodik also had two reigns as the Nebraska Heavyweight Champion. The following year, he defeated Bob Orton to win the AWA Midwest Heavyweight Championship.

In the 1970s, Garza wrestled as "The Mighty Igor" in the "Big Time Wrestling" circuit from Detroit, Michigan, performing with the likes of Bobo Brazil, The Sheik, Pampero Firpo, "Big" Tex McKenzie, The Stomper, Flying Fred Curry, and The Fabulous Kangaroos.

On January 7, 2002, Garza died after suffering a heart attack at a hospital in Detroit.

== Professional wrestling style and persona ==
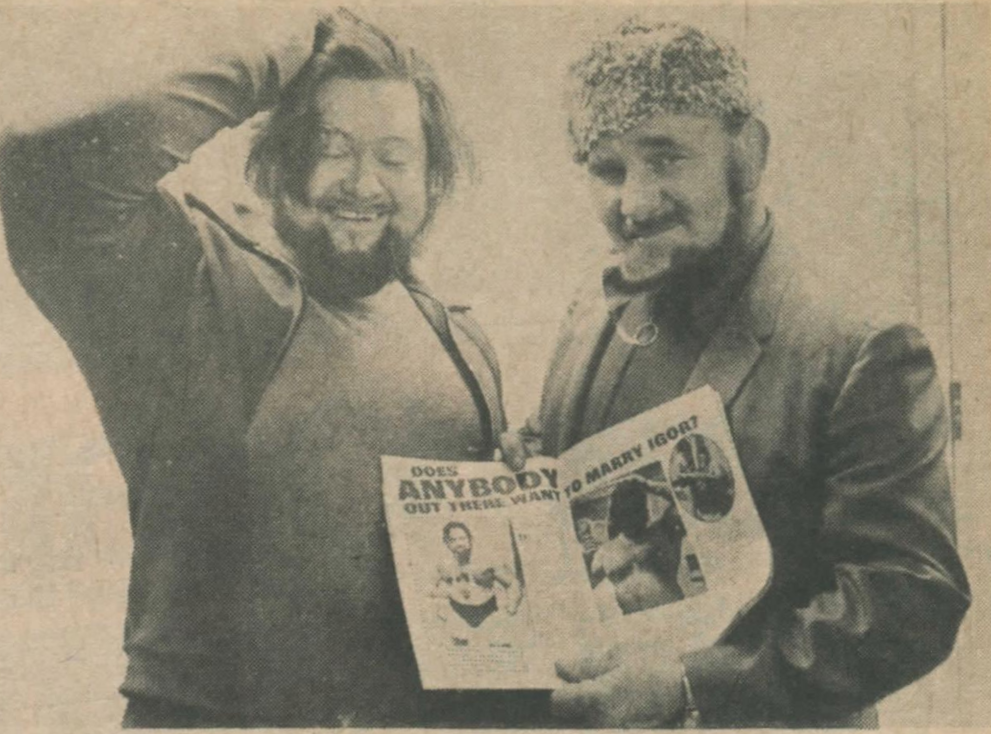
Mighty Igor (left) with his manager Ivan Kalmikoff in 1972

Garza used the gimmick of a friendly, but physically strong Polish man. At times, he would wear nurse's shoes and long underwear in addition to his wrestling attire to make himself look friendly or kind but he would be superhumanly strong. He was also known for bringing toys and kielbasa to the ring, and he shared the kielbasa with his fans.

The other component of Garza's gimmick was his strength. He performed several feats of strength for the audience, including leaning with his back against a wrestling ring and using his legs to hold back a car driving toward him. Other performances included bending iron bars or placing cement blocks on his head and having someone break them with a sledgehammer. Ivan Kalmikoff (Edward Bruce) acted as his manager, while in PR World Wrestling Council where he was a fan favorite and one-time WWC Puerto Rico Heavyweight legend Jose Miguel Perez acted as his manager.

== Championships and accomplishments ==
- National Wrestling Federation( Ohio & Upstate New York office)
  - NWF World Tag Team Championship(1 time) - with Johnny Powers
- National Wrestling Alliance
  - NWA World Tag Team Championship(Ohio & Upstate New York Version)(1 time) - with Powers
- American Wrestling Association
  - AWA Midwest Heavyweight Championship (1 time)
  - AWA World Heavyweight Championship (1 time)
  - Nebraska Heavyweight Championship (2 times)
- Big Time Wrestling
  - NWA United States Heavyweight Championship (Detroit version) (1 time)
  - NWA World Tag Team Championship (Detroit version) (1 time) — with Hank James
- International Wrestling Association
  - IWA World Tag Team Championship (1 time) – with Bulldog Brower
- NWA Los Angeles
  - WWA International Television Tag Team Championship (1 time) — with Eric Rommel
- New Independent Wrestling Association
  - NIWA Heavyweight Championship (1 time)
- World Wrestling Council
  - WWC Puerto Rico Heavyweight Championship (1 time)
- Other titles
- Wolverine Wrestling/Michigan Championship Wrestling
  - Michigan Heavyweight Championship (4 times)
  - Mid-West Heavyweight Championship (1 time)
