= Nebraska Heavyweight Championship =

Professional wrestling championship

The Nebraska Heavyweight Championship was a professional wrestling championship originally sanctioned by the Nebraska office of the National Wrestling Alliance and later the American Wrestling Association.

The title existed from 1959 through 1967, when it was unified with the AWA Midwest Heavyweight Championship.

== Title history ==
Silver areas in the history indicate periods of unknown lineage.

Wrestler:	Times:	Date:	Place:	Notes:
William Hokuf	1	Unknown		
Jack Reed	1	Unknown		
Jack Pesek	1	Unknown		
Ernie Dusek	1	Unknown		
Jack Pesek	2	1958		
Ernie Dusek	2	Unknown		
Crusher Lisowski	1	May 4, 1960 (NLT)	Holdrege, NE	
Jack Kesek	3	October 28, 1960 (NLT)		
Jack Reed	2	April 4, 1962		
Rocky Hamiliton	1	April 1962		
Bobby Managoff	1	1962		
Killer Karl Kox	1	1962		
Mike Dibiase	1	December 13, 1962	Amarillo, Texas	
Ernie Dusek	3	Unknown		
Mad Dog Vachon	1	February 12, 1964 (NLT)		
Otto Von Krupp	1	August 15, 1964	Omaha, NE	
Mad Dog Vachon	2	August 22, 1964	Omaha, NE	
Billy Red Cloud	1	October 9, 1964	Omaha, NE	
Pampero Firpo	1	December 1964		
Don Jardine	1	December 1964	Hastings, NE	
Mighty Igor Vodic	1	February 17, 1965	Beatrice, NE	
Stan Pulaski	1	October 2, 1965	Omaha, NE	
Tim Woods	1	November 25, 1965	Omaha, NE	
Mighty Igor Vodic	2	February 16, 1966	Beatrice, NE	
Dale Lewis	1	January 14, 1967	Omaha, NE	
Bobby Shane	1	March 4, 1967	Omaha, NE	
Bob Orton	1	May 27, 1967	Omaha, NE	
Title retired		July 15, 1967	Omaha, NE	Orton defeated Doug Gilbert to become the first AWA Midwest Heavyweight Champion and unified the Nebraska title with the Midwest title.

== See also ==
- National Wrestling Alliance
- American Wrestling Association
