= The Spoiler (wrestler) =

Canadian professional wrestler (1940–2006)

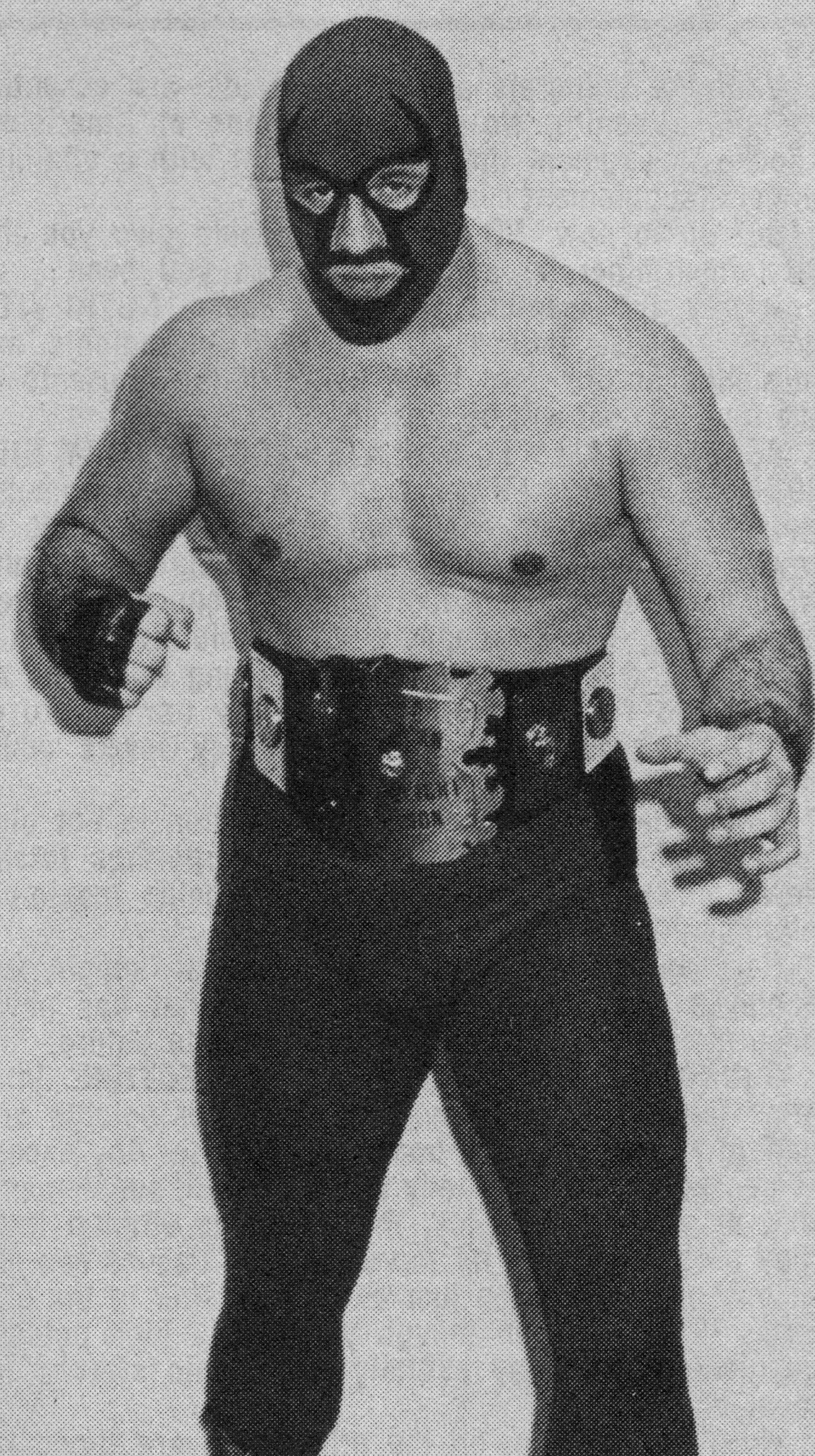

Personal information
- Born: Donald Delbert Jardine; 24 March 1940 Moncton, New Brunswick, Canada
- Died: 16 December 2006 (aged 66) Red Deer, Alberta, Canada
- Spouse: Evelyn Stevens (divorced)

Professional wrestling career
- Ring name(s): The Butcher; Don Jardine; Sonny Cooper; The Spoiler; Super Destroyer; Masked Enforcer
- Billed height: 6 ft 4 in (193 cm)
- Billed weight: 293 lb (133 kg)
- Billed from: "Parts Unknown" (as The Spoiler); Singapore (as Super Destroyer)
- Trained by: Whipper Billy Watson
- Debut: 1955
- Retired: 1994

Donald Delbert Jardine (24 March 1940 – 16 December 2006) was a Canadian professional wrestler best known for his masked gimmick as The Spoiler. Jardine was a major star in various wrestling promotions. He worked in the World Wrestling Federation, first in 1974 and again from 1984 to 1986. However Jardine had his greatest successes in the National Wrestling Alliance-affiliated territories of Florida, Georgia and Texas, from the early 1960s through the mid-1980s.

== Professional wrestling career ==
Jardine began wrestling in 1955 at the age of 15. He made his Maple Leaf Gardens debut in 1959 as "Babyface" Don Jardine, a protégé of Whipper Billy Watson, and wrestled primarily in Toronto until 1961 and returned briefly in 1964. In 1964, Jardine wrestled NWA World Heavyweight Champion Lou Thesz on television in St. Louis, but did not win the title. Jardine also wrestled as The Butcher in Los Angeles in 1964. While wrestling under the "Butcher" moniker, he teamed with both Mad Dog Vachon and Dutch Savage for a short time. He challenged Gene Kiniski for the NWA World Heavyweight Championship in 1966. He became one of the top masked wrestlers in the Southern United States, particularly in Texas, where The Spoiler character was created by Fritz Von Erich in 1967. He famously walked the top rope, a move he taught to Mark Calaway (the future Undertaker) in the mid-1980s while competing in World Class Championship Wrestling.

He was unmasked in Texas in 1972 by Billy Red Lyons and Red Bastein and identified as Don Jardine; still, he continued to wrestle under the mask as "The Spoiler" in Texas and Oklahoma. The Spoiler also wrestled in All Japan Pro Wrestling and New Japan Pro-Wrestling during the 1960s and 1970s. He became the Super Destroyer and was brought into the Carolinas by George Scott in 1973 and also used the "Super Destroyer" name during his stint in the AWA (1977–78). Jardine was one of the key workers, along with Johnny Valentine, who turned the Mid-Atlantic territory around and established hot singles wrestling programs in what had traditionally been a tag team territory. Jardine challenged Jack Brisco for the NWA World Heavyweight Championship as both Super Destroyer and The Spoiler, and wrestled Harley Race for the NWA heavyweight title in a main event in Houston, Texas, in 1979. He held the Georgia-based NWA National Heavyweight Championship and was briefly billed as NWA National Heavyweight Champion by the World Wrestling Federation after it bought out Georgia Championship Wrestling in July 1984.

The Spoiler wrestled 75 matches for the World Wide Wrestling Federation in 1972 before leaving for other promotions. He returned to the WWF and had his first match back for a television taping in Poughkeepsie, New York, on 30 July 1984, defeating Jeff Lang, and wrestled for a few years until his last match in the WWF on 21 January 1986 in Los Angeles, California, defeating Billy Anderson. The Spoiler, along with Jake "The Snake" Roberts and 400-pound King Kong Bundy, joined forces with a newly emerging tag team, the Road Warriors, to form the original Legion of Doom. The Spoiler once headlined against WWF Champion Pedro Morales in Madison Square Garden, wrestling maskless because, at that time, the arena had a rule barring masked wrestlers from performing. The Spoiler appeared in a historic match against Mil Mascaras, the Mexican legend, marking the first time a wrestler (Mascaras) ever wore a mask into a ring in New York State. The Spoiler's matches against Chief Jay Strongbow and Sonny King were long-lasting feuds that enjoyed successful runs across the WWF circuit. His "Iron Claw" was the first maneuver to be "censored" on television by the WWF in a promotional move.

Jardine promoted some shows in Tampa, Florida, in 1993-94 and then retired from wrestling.

== Personal life ==
Jardine spent the later years of his life in Wetaskiwin, Alberta, Canada, with his wife Becky Wylie Jardine and son, where he was the manager of a car wash business. Jardine was known to make clay sculptures and carved faces in the bark of cotton wood trees. He also volunteered for the Literacy Program, teaching young children to read.

On 16 December 2006, Jardine died due to complications from a heart attack and leukaemia in Red Deer, and was writing a novel based on his professional wrestling career at the time of his death. He went into cardiac arrest followed by a coma he never recovered from. He was 66.

== Legacy ==
Scottish professional wrestler Drew McDonald wrestled in the United Kingdom as a masked Spoiler for Joint Promotions in 1987, losing two televised tag matches to Big Daddy after the second of which he was unmasked and identified as McDonald.

== Championships and accomplishments ==
- American Wrestling Association
  - Nebraska Heavyweight Championship (1 time)
- Atlantic Grand Prix Wrestling
  - AGPW North American Tag Team Championship (1 time) – with Nikita Kalmikoff
- Central States Wrestling
  - NWA Central States Heavyweight Championship (1 time)
- Championship Wrestling from Florida
  - NWA Florida Heavyweight Championship (3 times)
  - NWA Southern Heavyweight Championship (Florida version) (1 time)
- Georgia Championship Wrestling
  - NWA Georgia Heavyweight Championship (3 times)
  - NWA National Heavyweight Championship (2 times)
- Gulf Coast Championship Wrestling
  - NWA Mississippi Heavyweight Championship (Note: The NWA Mississippi Heavyweight Championship that Jardine won was a version of the title that was defended only within the state of Mississippi at the time as part of the Gulf Coast Championship Wrestling roster. It should not be confused with the current version of the NWA Mississippi Heavyweight Championship that was created in 1999 and has been defended in NWA Mississippi and NWA Battlezone Championship Wrestling, where it is currently defended.) (2 times)
- NWA All-Star Wrestling
  - NWA Canadian Tag Team Championship (Vancouver version) (1 time) – with Dutch Savage
  - NWA World Tag Team Championship (Vancouver version) (2 times) – with Dutch Savage
- NWA Big Time Wrestling
  - NWA American Heavyweight Championship (4 times)
  - NWA American Tag Team Championship (6 times) – with Gary Hart (3), Smasher Sloan (2) and Mark Lewin (2)
  - NWA Brass Knuckles Championship (Texas version) (1 time)
  - NWA Television Championship (Texas version) (3 times)
  - NWA Texas Heavyweight Championship (2 times)
  - NWA Texas Tag Team Championship (1 time) – with Mark Lewin
  - NWA United States Heavyweight Championship (Texas version) (1 time) (Note: This championship would be renamed the NWA American Heavyweight Championship in May 1968. It would go on to be renamed the WCWA World Heavyweight Championship after World Class' withdrawal from the NWA in February 1986.)
  - NWA Television Championship (3 times)
- NWA Hollywood Wrestling
  - NWA Americas Tag Team Championship (1 Time)- with Ricky Santana(The Hood)
- NWA Mid-America
  - City of Mobile Heavyweight Championship (1 time)
  - NWA Tennessee Tag Team Championship (1 time) – with Spoiler #2
- NWA Tri-State
  - NWA North American Heavyweight Championship (Tri-State version) (3 times)
  - NWA United States Tag Team Championship (Tri-State version) (3 times) – with Buddy Wolfe (2) and Dusty Rhodes (1)
- World Championship Wrestling
  - IWA World Heavyweight Championship (1 time)
  - IWA World Tag Team Championship (3 times) – with Mario Milano (1) and Waldo Von Erich (2)

=== Luchas de Apuestas record ===
Winner (wager)	Loser (wager)	Location	Event	Date	Notes
Bret Hart (hair)	The Spoiler (mask)	Toronto, Ontario	WWF Toronto	13 January 1985	
The Spoiler (mask)	Reggie Parks (mask)	Fayetteville, North Carolina	MACW Fayetteville	17 March 1975	
The Spoiler (mask)	Reggie Parks (mask)	Charleston, South Carolina	MACW Charleston	21 March 1975	
The Spoiler (mask)	Reggie Parks (mask)	Columbia, South Carolina	MACW Columbia	22 March 1975	
Fritz Von Erich (hair)	The Spoiler (mask)	Dallas, Texas	WCCW Dallas	15 October 1968	
