= NWA Southern Heavyweight Championship (Georgia version) =

Professional wrestling championship

Details
- Promotion: Georgia Championship Wrestling
- Date established: 1948
- Date retired: 1973
Statistics
- First champion: Chris Belkas
- Most reigns: Don McIntyre (19)

The Georgia version of the National Wrestling Alliance (NWA) Southern Heavyweight Championship was a secondary singles championship used in Georgia Championship Wrestling off-and-on from 1948 to 1972. The title is one of many versions of the NWA Southern Heavyweight Championship. Other versions have been used in Florida and the Tennessee cities of Knoxville and Memphis.

== Title history ==
Silver marks in the title history indicate periods of unknown lineage. An (n) placed after a date indicates that a title change occurred no later than the date listed.

Wrestler:	Times:	Date:	Location:	Notes:
Chris Belkas	1	November 1, 1948 (n)		Records unclear as to whom he defeated.
The title was vacated when Belkas left the area in November 1948.
Tom Mahoney	1	July 15, 1949	Atlanta, Georgia	Defeated Al Massey in a tournament final.
Don McIntyre	1	August 5, 1949	Atlanta, Georgia	
Black Menace	1	September 16, 1949	Atlanta, Georgia	
Don McIntyre	2	September 23, 1949	Atlanta, Georgia	
Danno O'Connor	1	November 25, 1949	Atlanta, Georgia	
George Flynn	1	December 16, 1949	Atlanta, Georgia	
Ray Villmer	1	December 23, 1949	Atlanta, Georgia	
Rebel Russell	1	March 1950 (n)		
Nick Carter	1	March 31, 1950	Atlanta, Georgia	
Red Terror	1	May 12, 1950	Atlanta, Georgia	
Don McIntyre	3	May 19, 1950	Atlanta, Georgia	
Art Nielson	1	July 7, 1950	Atlanta, Georgia	
Jack Kennedy	1	November 3, 1950	Atlanta, Georgia	
Lord Finis Hall	1	November 24, 1950	Atlanta, Georgia	
Art Nielson	2	December 8, 1950	Atlanta, Georgia	
Golden Terror (Danny Plechas)	1	January 26, 1951	Atlanta, Georgia	
Don McIntyre	4	March 30, 1951	Atlanta, Georgia	
Art Nielson	3	July 28, 1951	Atlanta, Georgia	
Don McIntyre	5	August 3, 1951	Atlanta, Georgia	
Art Nielson	4	August 10, 1951	Atlanta, Georgia	
Don McIntyre	6	September 10, 1951	Augusta, Georgia	
Lou Newman	1	March 28, 1952	Atlanta, Georgia	
Jack McDonald	1	April 25, 1952	Atlanta, Georgia	
Al Massey	1	May 2, 1952	Atlanta, Georgia	
Angelo Martinelli	1	June 20, 1952	Atlanta, Georgia	
Art Nielson	5	July 11, 1952	Atlanta, Georgia	
Tarzan White	1	September 5, 1952	Atlanta, Georgia	
Don McIntyre	7	September 1952	Atlanta, Georgia	
Aldo Bogni	1	January 26, 1953	Augusta, Georgia	
Don McIntyre	8	September 1952	Atlanta, Georgia	
Gorgeous George	1	March 7, 1953	Atlanta, Georgia	
Don McIntyre	9	March 16, 1953 (n)		Also recognized in Florida no later than June 22, 1953.
Ray Villmer	2	October 16, 1953	Atlanta, Georgia	
Don McIntyre	10	January 11, 1954	Augusta, Georgia	
Fred Blassie	1	February 8, 1954	Birmingham, Alabama	Defeated Mr. Moto. The title was held up after a match against Mr. Moto on May 8, 1954 in Spartanburg, South Carolina, but was returned to Blassie.
Don McIntyre	11	August 26, 1955	Atlanta, Georgia	
Fred Blassie	2	September 16, 1955	Atlanta, Georgia	
Don McIntyre	12	October 28, 1955	Atlanta, Georgia	
Fred Blassie	3	November 25, 1955	Atlanta, Georgia	
Don McIntyre	13	September 7, 1956	Atlanta, Georgia	
Art Neilson	6	September 21, 1956	Atlanta, Georgia	
Bull Curry	1	September 28, 1956	Atlanta, Georgia	
Fred Blassie	4	October 19, 1956	Atlanta, Georgia	
Bobby Wepner	1	November 23, 1956	Atlanta, Georgia	
Jerry Graham	1	December 14, 1956	Atlanta, Georgia	
Chief Big Heart	1	January 4, 1957	Atlanta, Georgia	
Jerry Graham	2	January 11, 1957	Atlanta, Georgia	
Red McIntyre	1	February 22, 1957 (n)		McIntyre was recognized as champion in Marietta, Georgia.
Kurt Von Brauner	1	April 10, 1957 (n)		Von Brauner was recognized as champion in Augusta, Georgia.
Red McIntyre	2	April 19, 1957 (n)		McIntyre was recognized as champion in Atlanta, Georgia, and may have defeated Von Brauner on April 10.
Kurt Von Brauner	2	May 1957 (n)		Defeated Don McIntyre to become recognized as champion in Atlanta, Georgia.
Don McIntyre	14	May 3, 1957	Atlanta, Georgia	
Kurt Von Brauner	3	May 31, 1957 (n)		Von Brauner is still or again recognized as champion in Marietta, Georgia.
Don McIntyre	15	June 14, 1957	Atlanta, Georgia	
Kurt Von Brauner	4	June 17, 1957 (n)		Von Brauner was recognized as champion in Augusta, Georgia.
Don McIntyre	16	June 24, 1957 (n)		McIntyre defended the title against Kurt Von Brauner in Augusta, Georgia.
Kurt Von Brauner	5	June 28, 1957	Atlanta, Georgia	
Ray Gunkel	1	October 18, 1957	Atlanta, Georgia	
The Mighty Yankee	1	January 10, 1958	Atlanta, Georgia	
Don McIntyre	17	April 25, 1958	Atlanta, Georgia	
Fred Blassie	5	June 13, 1958	Atlanta, Georgia	
Don McIntyre	18	July 25, 1958	Atlanta, Georgia	
Fred Blassie	6	August 8, 1958	Atlanta, Georgia	
Ray Gunkel	2	August 22, 1958	Atlanta, Georgia	
Fred Blassie	7	September 5, 1958	Atlanta, Georgia	
Ray Gunkel	3	November 7, 1958	Atlanta, Georgia	
Fred Blassie	8	January 2, 1959	Atlanta, Georgia	
Dick Gunkel (Dick Steinborn)	1	April 17, 1959	Atlanta, Georgia	
Fred Blassie	9	June 19, 1959	Atlanta, Georgia	
Dick Gunkel	2	July 31, 1959	Atlanta, Georgia	
Fred Blassie	10	August 7, 1959	Atlanta, Georgia	
Ray Gunkel	4	October 2, 1959	Atlanta, Georgia	
Fred Blassie	11	November 1959		
Ray Gunkel	5	December 1959 (n)		
Fred Blassie	12	December 11, 1959	Atlanta, Georgia	Defeated Dick Gunkel, substituting for the injured Ray Gunkel.
Ray Gunkel	6	December 25, 1959	Atlanta, Georgia	Won by disqualification and may not have been a title change, although Gunkel was champion in January 1960.
Fred Blassie	13	April 15, 1960	Atlanta, Georgia	Defeated Dick Gunkel.
The title was held up after a match against Eric Pederson on May 13, 1960 in Atlanta, Georgia.
Fred Blassie	14	May 20, 1960	Atlanta, Georgia	Defeated Eric Pederson in a rematch.
Ray Gunkel	7	June 10, 1960	Atlanta, Georgia	
The title was held up after a match against The Mighty Yankee on June 17, 1960 in Atlanta, Georgia.
Dick Steinborn	3	July 22, 1960	Atlanta, Georgia	Defeated The Mighty Yankee.
The Mighty Yankee	2	July 29, 1960	Atlanta, Georgia	
The title was held up after a match against Don McIntyre on August 5, 1960 in Atlanta, Georgia.
Don McIntyre	19	August 12, 1960	Atlanta, Georgia	Defeated The Mighty Yankee in a rematch.
Fred Blassie	15	October 21, 1960	Atlanta, Georgia	
The title was held up after a match against Tiny Evans on November 4, 1960 in Atlanta, Georgia.
Fred Blassie	16	November 11, 1960	Atlanta, Georgia	Defeated Tiny Evans in a rematch.
Tiny Evans	1	November 18, 1960	Atlanta, Georgia	
Fred Blassie	17	December 20, 1960	Atlanta, Georgia	
Chief Little Eagle	1	February 14, 1961 (n)		Little Eagle defeated Fred Blassie on January 3 in Macon, Georgia and January 4 in Columbus, Georgia, but neither may have been title matches.
Skull Murphy	1	February 14, 1961	Macon, Georgia	
The title was vacated in March 1961.
Skull Murphy	2	March 15, 1961	Columbus, Georgia	Defeated Bill Dromo in a tournament final.
Guy Mitchell	1	March 29, 1961	Columbus, Georgia	Murphy was still recognized as champion in Macon, Georgia, with Chief Little Eagle defeating Murphy on April 4 for Macon recognition.
Skull Murphy	3	April 5, 1961	Columbus, Georgia	Murphy also defeated Chief Little Eagle by disqualification on April 11 in Macon, Georgia to become recognized as champion statewide.
Ray Gunkel	7	June 13, 1961 (n)		Gunkel was recognized as champion in Macon, Georgia.
Eddie Graham	1	March 17, 1962	Tampa, Florida	Graham won a tournament for the Florida version, which was recognized in Georgia after April 24.
Lenny Montana	1	May 1, 1962	Macon, Georgia	Lenny defeated Eddie Graham in a title match.
Bob Orton	1	June 17, 1965	Jacksonville, Florida	Orton won a tournament for the Florida version, which was recognized in Georgia after October 8.
Buddy Fuller	1	March 25, 1966 (n)		Records unclear as to whom he defeated.
Louie Tillet	1	May 27, 1966	Atlanta, Georgia	
Buddy Fuller	2	June 17, 1966	Atlanta, Georgia	
Butcher Vachon	1	October 7, 1966 (n)		Records unclear as to whom he defeated.
Buddy Colt	1	November 28, 1972 (n)		Records unclear as to whom he defeated.
Bob Armstrong	1	December 15, 1972	Atlanta, Georgia	
Buddy Colt	2	December 29, 1972	Atlanta, Georgia	
Title retired in 1973.

== See also ==
- List of National Wrestling Alliance championships
- NWA Southern Heavyweight Championship (Florida version)
- NWA Southern Heavyweight Championship (Tennessee version)
