= Cowboy Bob Ellis =

American professional wrestler (1929–2018)

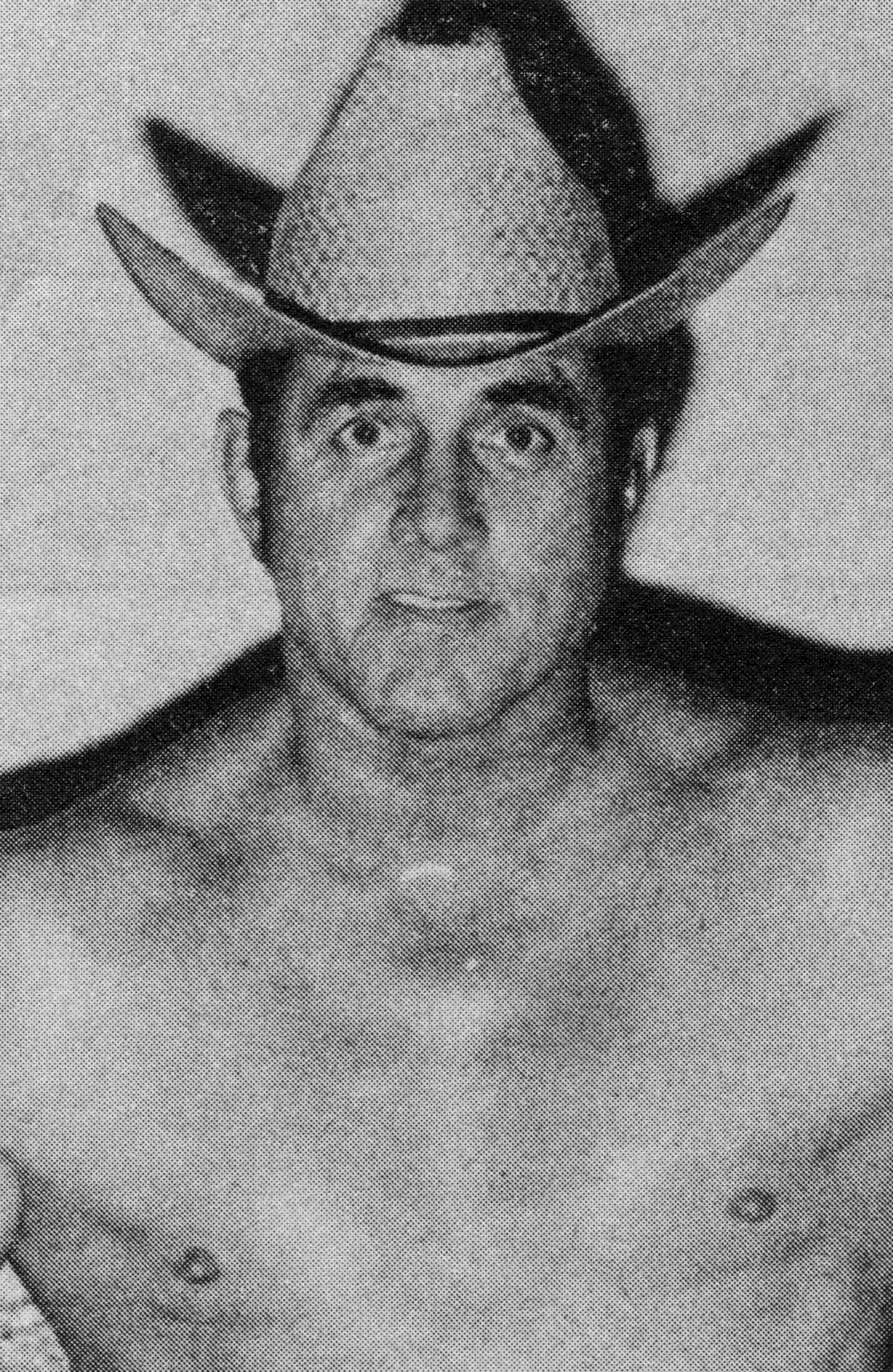

Personal information
- Born: Robert Al Ellis; March 15, 1929 San Angelo, Texas, U.S.
- Died: December 21, 2018 (aged 89) Ardmore, Oklahoma, U.S.
- Education: McMurry College

Professional wrestling career
- Ring name(s): Bob Ellis; Bob Elliott
- Billed height: 6 ft 3 in (191 cm)
- Billed weight: 235 lb (107 kg)
- Trained by: Sandor Szabo
- Debut: 1957
- Retired: 1980
- Military service
- Allegiance: United States
- Branch: United States Army
- Conflicts: Korean War

Robert Al Ellis (March 15, 1929 – December 21, 2018) was an American professional wrestler. He wrestled under the ring name, Cowboy Bob Ellis for over 20 years in various wrestling promotions in the States, Canada and Australia. He was a two-time WWA World Heavyweight Champion in Indianapolis. He is known as the inventor of the bulldog.

== Background ==
Robert Al Ellis was born in San Angelo, Texas on March 15, 1929. He played high school football. He went on to attend McMurry College where he again played football. Ellis served three years in the United States Army as a paratrooper, making 53 jumps during the Korean War.

Ellis died in Ardmore, Oklahoma on December 21, 2018, at the age of 89.

== Professional wrestling career ==
Ellis is known for having invented the bulldog technique.

== Championships and accomplishments ==
- American Wrestling Alliance
  - AWA Indiana United States Heavyweight Championship (2 times)
- American Wrestling Association
  - AWA Midwest Heavyweight Championship (3 times)
  - AWA Midwest Tag Team Championship (3 times) – with Stan Pulaski (1), Alberto Torres (1) and Jerry Miller (1)
- Arizona Athletic Association Inc.
  - United States Heavyweight Championship
- Big Time Wrestling
  - NWA United States Heavyweight Championship (Detroit version) (1 time)
- Capitol Wrestling Corporation
  - NWA United States Tag Team Championship (Northeast version) (1 time) – with Johnny Valentine
- Cauliflower Alley Club
  - Other honoree (1993)
- Championship Wrestling from Florida
  - NWA Southern Heavyweight Championship (Florida version) (1 time)
  - NWA United States Tag Team Championship (Florida version) (1 time) – with Ray Gunkel
  - NWA Southern Tag Team Championship (Florida version) (1 time) with Don Curtis
- Central States Wrestling
  - NWA Central States Heavyweight Championship (2 times)
  - NWA North American Tag Team Championship (Central States version) (2 times) – with Archie Gouldie (1), The Viking (1)
- Continental Wrestling Association
  - AWA Southern Tag Team Championship (1 time) - with Jimmy Garvin
- Mid-Atlantic Championship Wrestling
  - NWA Atlantic Coast Tag Team Championship (1 time) - with Johnny Weaver
- North American Wrestling Alliance / Worldwide Wrestling Associates / NWA Hollywood Wrestling
  - WWA World Tag Team Championship (1 time) - with Édouard Carpentier
- NWA San Francisco
  - NWA United States Heavyweight Championship
- St. Louis Wrestling Hall of Fame
  - Class of 2010
- World Championship Wrestling (Australia)
  - IWA World Heavyweight Championship (Australia)
- World Wrestling Association
  - WWA World Heavyweight Championship (2 times)
- World Wrestling Council
  - WWC North American Heavyweight Championship (1 time)
  - WWC North American Tag Team Championship (1 time) - with Carlos Colon
