= AWA Midwest Heavyweight Championship =

Professional wrestling championship

Details
- Promotion: American Wrestling Association
- Date established: 1967
- Date retired: September 2, 1972
Statistics
- First champion(s): Dale Lewis
- Most reigns: Stan Pulaski (6 Times)
- Longest reign: The Claw (211 days)
- Shortest reign: Mike DiBiase (7 days)

The AWA Midwest Heavyweight Championship was a title in the late 1960s and early 1970s in the American Wrestling Association. It was primarily defended in the Omaha, Nebraska area and was a title for mid-level wrestlers.

== Title history ==
Key
No.	Overall reign number
Reign	Reign number for the specific champion
Days	Number of days held

No.	Champion	Championship change			Reign statistics		Notes	Ref.
No.	Champion	Date	Event	Location	Reign	Days	Notes	Ref.
1	Dale Lewis	1967	House show	N/A	1	(Note: The length of Dale Lewis' title reign is too uncertain to calculate.)		
2	Bobby Shane	1967	House show	N/A	1	(Note: The length of Bobby Shane's title reign is too uncertain to calculate.)		
3	Bob Orton	July 15, 1967	House show	Omaha, Nebraska	1	105		
4	Rock Rogowski	October 28, 1967	House show	Omaha, Nebraska	1	14		
5	Bob Orton	November 11, 1967	House show	Omaha, Nebraska	2	28		
6	Mighty Igor Vodic	December 9, 1967	House show	Omaha, Nebraska	1	28		
7	Mike Dibiase	January 6, 1968	House show	Omaha, Nebraska	1	161		
8	Bob Ellis	June 15, 1968	House show	Omaha, Nebraska	1	63		
9	Mike Dibiase	August 17, 1968	House show	Omaha, Nebraska	2	7		
10	Bob Ellis	August 24, 1968	House show	Omaha, Nebraska	2	94		
11	Mike Dibiase	November 26, 1968	House show	Omaha, Nebraska	3	67		
12	Stan Pulaski	February 1, 1969	House show	Omaha, Nebraska	1	259		
13	Tarzan Tyler	October 18, 1969	House show	Omaha, Nebraska	1	75		
14	Stan Pulaski	January 1, 1970	House show	Omaha, Nebraska	2	14		
15	Lars Anderson	January 15, 1970	House show	Omaha, Nebraska	1	72		
16	Stan Pulaski	March 28, 1970	House show	Omaha, Nebraska	3	26		
17	Beautiful Brutus	April 23, 1970	House show	Omaha, Nebraska	1	9		
18	Bob Ellis	May 2, 1970	House show	Omaha, Nebraska	3	(Note: The exact date Ellis' title reign ended has not been documented, which puts the reign at between 30 and 48 days.)		
19	Lars Anderson	June 1970	House show	Lincoln, Nebraska	2	(Note: The exact date Anderson's title reign began has not been documented, which puts the reign at between 1 day and 50 days.)		
20	Bob Ellis	June 20, 1970	House show	Omaha, Nebraska	4	35		
21	Tarzan Tyler	July 25, 1970	House show	Omaha, Nebraska	2	77		
22	Tex Mckenzie	October 10, 1970	House show	Omaha, Nebraska	1	28		
23	Rock Rogowski	November 7, 1970	House show	Omaha, Nebraska	2	28		
24	Stan Pulaski	December 5, 1970	House show	Omaha, Nebraska	4	34		
25	The Claw (Note: Tom Andrews)	January 8, 1971	House show	Omaha, Nebraska	1	211		
26	Ramón Torres	August 7, 1971	House show	Omaha, Nebraska	1	(Note: The exact date Torres lost the championship is undocumented, which means that his reign lasted between 1 day and 24 days.)		
27	Jimmy Snuka	August 1971	House show	Omaha, Nebraska	1	(Note: The exact date Snuka won the championship is undocumented, which means that his reign lasted between 11 and 41 days.)		
28	Great Kusatsu	September 11, 1971	House show	Omaha, Nebraska	1	196		
29	Stan Pulaski	March 25, 1972	House show	Omaha, Nebraska	5	14		
30	Buddy Wolfe	April 8, 1972	House show	Omaha, Nebraska	1	(Note: The exact date the championship was declared vacant is unknown, which put this rein at between 1 day and 27 days.)		
		N/A	N/A	N/A			Due to a "groggy" referee handing out double decisions.	
31	Buddy Wolfe	May 6, 1972	House show	Omaha, Nebraska	2	28	Defeated Stan Pulaski.	
32	Stan Pulaski	June 3, 1972	House show	Omaha, Nebraska	6	91		
—	Deactivated	September 2, 1972	—	—	—	—		
