= NWA Southern Heavyweight Championship (Florida version) =

Professional wrestling championship

- A version of the championship belt

Details
- Promotion: Championship Wrestling from Florida
- Date established: March 17, 1962
- Date retired: February 1987
Statistics
- First champion: Eddie Graham
- Final champion: Kevin Sullivan
- Most reigns: Dusty Rhodes (10 reigns)
- Longest reign: Steve Corino (521 days)
- Shortest reign: Bobby Duncum (7 days)

The Florida version of the NWA Southern Heavyweight Championship was the major singles professional wrestling championship in the National Wrestling Alliance's Florida territory, Championship Wrestling Florida. It existed from 1962 until 1987, when the title was abandoned. It was revived by NWA Florida in 1996. At various times, different NWA affiliated promotions used their own regional version of the title including promotions based in Georgia, Tennessee, and the Carolinas.

== Title history ==
Key
No.	Overall reign number
Reign	Reign number for the specific champion
Days	Number of days held

No.	Champion	Championship change			Reign statistics		Notes	Ref.
No.	Champion	Date	Event	Location	Reign	Days	Notes	Ref.
1	Eddie Graham	March 17, 1962	CWF Show	Tampa, Florida	1	68	Won tournament to become the first champion	
—	Vacated	May 24, 1962	—	—	—	—	Eddie Graham was injured and unable to defend the championship	
2	Boris Malenko	July 25, 1962	N/A	N/A	1	127	Awarded after Malenko injured Graham to cause the title to become vacant	
3	Eddie Graham	November 29, 1962	CWF Show	Jacksonville, Florida	2	82		
4	Hiro Matsuda	February 19, 1963	CWF Show	Tampa, Florida	1	163		
5	Eddie Graham	August 1, 1963	CWF Show	Jacksonville, Florida	3	149		
6	Bob Orton	December 28, 1963	CWF Show	Jacksonville, Florida	1	66		
7	Bob Ellis	March 3, 1964	CWF Show	Tampa, Florida	1	93		
8	Bob Orton	June 4, 1964	CWF Show	Jacksonville, Florida	2	208		
9	Tarzan Tyler	December 29, 1964	CWF Show	Tampa, Florida	1	(Note: The date the championship was vacated is uncertain, which means that the reign lasted between 93 and 122 days.)		
—	Vacated	April 1965	—	—	—	—	Championship vacated for undocumented reasons	
10	Bob Orton	June 17, 1965	CWF Show	Jacksonville, Florida	3	252	Won a tournament	
11	Tarzan Tyler	February 24, 1966	CWF Show	Jacksonville, Florida	2	12		
12	The Missouri Mauler	March 8, 1966	CWF Show	Tampa, Florida	1	(Note: The length of the championship reign is too uncertain to calculate.)		
13	Johnny Weaver	1967	CWF Show	Florida	1			
14	The Missouri Mauler	1967	CWF Show	Florida	2			
15	Johnny Weaver	July 1968	CWF Show	Charlotte, North Carolina	2	(Note: The date the championship was won and lost is uncertain, which means that the reign lasted between 1 and 31 days.)		
16	Red Bastien	July 1968	CWF Show	Florida	1	(Note: The date the championship was won and lost is uncertain, which means that the reign lasted between 154 and 214 days.)		
17	The Missouri Mauler	January 1969	CWF Show	Florida	3	(Note: The date the championship was won is uncertain, which means that the reign lasted between 11 and 41 days.)		
18	Jack Brisco	February 11, 1969	CWF Show	Tampa, Florida	1	(Note: The date the championship was won is uncertain, which means that the reign lasted between 1 and 146 days.)		
19	The Missouri Mauler	1969	CWF Show	Florida	4	(Note: The date the championship was won is uncertain, which means that the reign lasted between 1 and 146 days.)		
20	Jack Brisco	July 8, 1969	CWF Show	Tampa, Florida	2	(Note: The date the championship was vacated is uncertain, which means that the reign lasted between 116 and 145 days.)		
—	Vacated	November 1969	—	—	—	—	Vacated after Jack Brisco left the territory to work in Japan	
21	Danny Miller	January 3, 1970	CWF Show	Tampa, Florida	1	10		
22	The Missouri Mauler	January 13, 1970	CWF Show	Tampa, Florida	5	49		
23	Bob Orton	March 3, 1970	CWF Show	Tampa, Florida	4	39		
24	Dale Lewis	April 11, 1970	CWF Show	Jacksonville, Florida	1	66		
25	Hiro Matsuda	June 16, 1970	CWF Show	Tampa, Florida	2	58		
26	Great Mephisto	August 13, 1970	CWF Show	Tampa, Florida	1	50		
27	Hiro Matsuda	October 2, 1970	CWF Show	Tallahassee, Florida	3	34		
28	Great Mephisto	November 5, 1970	CWF Show	Jacksonville, Florida	2	96		
29	Rene Goulet	February 9, 1971	CWF Show	Tampa, Florida	1	42}		
30	The Grappler	March 23, 1971	CWF Show	Tampa, Florida	1	22		
31	Terry Funk	April 14, 1971	CWF Show	Miami, Florida	1	7		
32	Dick Murdoch	April 21, 1971	CWF Show	Tampa, Florida	1	48		
33	Jack Brisco	June 8, 1971	CWF Show	Tampa, Florida	3	108		
—	Vacated	September 24, 1971	—	—	—	—	Vacated after a match against Dick Murdoch ended in controversial fashion.	
34	Bobby Duncum	October 7, 1971	CWF Show	Tampa, Florida	1	7	Won tournament	
35	George Gaiser	October 14, 1971	CWF Show	Tampa, Florida	1	40		
36	Bobby Shane	November 23, 1971	CWF Show	Tampa, Florida	1	84		
—	Vacated	February 15, 1972	—	—	—	—	Vacated after a match against Tim Woods ended in controversial fashion	
37	Tim Woods	February 29, 1972	CWF Show	Tampa, Florida	1	116	won the rematch	
38	The Zodiac	June 24, 1972	CWF Show	Jacksonville, Florida	5	(Note: The date the championship was lost is uncertain, which means that the reign lasted between 7 and 37 days.)		
39	Dale Lewis	July 1972	CWF Show	Florida	2	(Note: The date the championship was won is uncertain, which means that the reign lasted between 1 and 31 days.)		
40	The Zodiac	August 1, 1972	CWF Show	Tampa, Florida	6	11		
41	Tim Woods	August 12, 1972	CWF Show	Tampa, Florida	2	24		
42	Buddy Colt	September 5, 1972	CWF Show	Tampa, Florida	1	14		
43	Tim Woods	September 19, 1972	CWF Show	Tampa, Florida	3	42		
44	Buddy Colt	October 31, 1972	CWF Show	Tampa, Florida	2	21		
45	Tim Woods	November 21, 1972	CWF Show	Tampa, Florida	4	27		
46	Buddy Colt	December 18, 1972	CWF Show	Orlando, Florida	3	22		
47	Mark Lewin	January 9, 1973	CWF Show	Tampa, Florida	1	28		
48	Buddy Colt	February 6, 1973	CWF Show	Tampa, Florida	4	22		
49	Mr. Kleen	February 28, 1973	CWF Show	Miami, Florida	1	12		
50	Paul Jones	March 12, 1973	CWF Show	Orlando, Florida	1	29		
51	Ron Fuller	April 10, 1973	CWF Show	Tampa, Florida	1	77		
52	Johnny Valentine	June 26, 1973	CWF Show	Tampa, Florida	1	49		
53	Bill Dromo	August 14, 1973	CWF Show	Tampa, Florida	1	22		
54	Dusty Rhodes	September 5, 1973	CWF Show	Miami Beach, Florida	1	27		
55	Thunderbolt Patterson	October 2, 1973	CWF Show	Tampa, Florida	1	7		
56	Dusty Rhodes	October 9, 1973	CWF Show	Tampa, Florida	2	7		
—	Vacated	October 16, 1973	—	—	—	—	Championship vacated after a match against Paul Jones ended inconclusively	
57	Dusty Rhodes	October 23, 1973	CWF Show	Tampa, Florida	3	105	Defeated Paul Jones in rematch	
58	Jos LeDuc	February 5, 1974	CWF Show	Florida	1	35		
59	Dusty Rhodes	March 12, 1974	CWF Show	Tampa, Florida	4	128		
—	Vacated	July 18, 1974	—	—	—	—	Vacated after Pak Song defeated Rhodes	
60	Dusty Rhodes	July 20, 1974	CWF Show	St. Petersburg, Florida	5	5	Defeated Pak Song in rematch	
61	Pak Song	July 25, 1974	CWF Show	Jacksonville, Florida	1	19		
62	Jerry Brisco	August 13, 1974	CWF Show	Tampa, Florida	1	(Note: The date the championship was lost is uncertain, which means that the reign lasted between 1 and 89 days.)		
63	Bill Watts	1974	CWF Show	Florida	1	(Note: The date the championship was won is uncertain, which means that the reign lasted between 1 and 89 days.)		
64	Jos LeDuc	November 11, 1974	CWF Show	West Palm Beach, Florida	2	22		
65	The Stomper	December 3, 1974	CWF Show	Tampa, Florida	1	77		
66	Bob Armstrong	February 18, 1975	CWF Show	Tampa, Florida	1	14		
67	The Stomper	March 4, 1975	CWF Show	Tampa, Florida	2	13		
68	Pepper Gomez	March 17, 1975	CWF Show	St. Petersburg, Florida	1	89		
69	Killer Karl Krupp	June 14, 1975	CWF Show	St. Petersburg, Florida	1	(Note: The date the championship was lost is uncertain, which means that the reign lasted between 1 and 72 days.)		
70	Mike George	1975	CWF Show	Florida	1	(Note: The date the championship was won and lost is uncertain, which means that the reign lasted between 1 and 72 days.)		
71	Killer Karl Krupp	1975	CWF Show	Florida	2	(Note: The date the championship was won and lost is uncertain, which means that the reign lasted between 1 and 72 days.)		
72	Harley Race	August 25, 1975	CWF Show	West Palm Beach, Florida	1	21		
73	Dusty Rhodes	September 15, 1975	CWF Show	West Palm Beach, Florida	6	8		
74	Harley Race	September 23, 1975 (NET)	CWF Show	Florida	2	(Note: The date the championship was won and lost is uncertain, which means that the reign lasted between 39 and 54 days.)		
75	Jerry Brisco	November 1975	CWF Show	Florida	2	(Note: The date the championship was won and lost is uncertain, which means that the reign lasted between 16 and 58 days.)		
76	Masked Destroyer	November 16, 1975 (NET)	CWF Show	Florida	1	(Note: The date the championship was won is uncertain, which means that the reign lasted between 1 and 43 days.)		
77	Billy Robinson	December 29, 1975	CWF Show	Florida	1	106		
78	The Assassin	April 13, 1976	CWF Show	Tampa, Florida	1	21		
79	Dusty Rhodes	May 4, 1976	CWF Show	West Palm Beach, Florida	7	35		
80	The Assassin	June 8, 1976	CWF Show	Tampa, Florida	2	144		
81	Steve Keirn	October 30, 1976	CWF Show	St. Petersburg, Florida	1			
82	Ox Baker	1976 or 1977	CWF Show	Florida	1			
83	"Superstar" Billy Graham	1977	CWF Show	Florida	1	(Note: The date the championship was won and lost is uncertain, which means that the reign lasted between 1 and 143 days.)		
84	Steve Keirn	1977	CWF Show	Florida	2	(Note: The date the championship was won and lost is uncertain, which means that the reign lasted between 1 and 143 days.)		
85	Ivan Koloff	May 24, 1977	CWF Show	Tampa, Florida	1	126		
86	Pedro Morales	September 27, 1977	CWF Show	Tampa, Florida	1	161		
87	Dick Slater	March 7, 1978 (NLT)	CWF Show	Florida	1	51		
88	Jerry Brisco	April 27, 1978	CWF Show	Jacksonville, Florida	3	4		
89	Dick Slater	May 1, 1978	CWF Show	Florida	2	48		
90	Dusty Rhodes	June 18, 1978	CWF Show	Sarasota, Florida	8	45		
91	The Spoiler	August 2, 1978	CWF Show	Miami Beach, Florida	1	21	Won a double title match as Spoiler was the NWA Florida Heavyweight Champion	
92	Wahoo McDaniel	August 23, 1978	CWF Show	Miami Beach, Florida	1	81		
93	Dick Slater	November 12, 1978	CWF Show	Orlando, Florida	3	48		
94	Terry Funk	December 30, 1978	CWF Show	St. Petersburg, Florida	2	21		
95	Thor the Viking	January 20, 1979	CWF Show	St. Petersburg, Florida	1	70		
96	Jimmy Garvin	March 31, 1979	CWF Show	St. Petersburg, Florida	1	58		
97	King Curtis Iaukea	May 28, 1979	CWF Show	West Palm Beach, Florida	1	(Note: The date the championship was lost is uncertain, which means that the reign lasted between 126 and 151 days.)		
98	Ernie Ladd	October 1979	CWF Show	Lafayette, Louisiana	1	(Note: The date the championship was lost is uncertain, which means that the reign lasted between 1 and 26 days.)		
99	Sweet Brown Sugar	October 26, 1979	CWF Show	St. Petersburg, Florida	1	29		
100	Leroy Brown	November 24, 1979	CWF Show	St. Petersburg, Florida	1	84		
101	Dusty Rhodes	February 16, 1980	CWF Show	Jacksonville, Florida	9	(Note: The date the championship was vacated is uncertain, which means that the reign lasted between 136 and 166 days.)		
—	Vacated	July 1980	—	—	—	—	Vacated so that Rhodes could focus on a match for the NWA World Heavyweight Championship	
102	Dick Slater	August 3, 1980	CWF Show	Tampa, Florida	4	177		
103	Mike Graham	January 27, 1981	CWF Show	Tampa, Florida	1	7		
104	Dick Slater	February 3, 1981	CWF Show	Tampa, Florida	5	1		
105	Sweet Brown Sugar	February 4, 1981	CWF Show	Ft. Myers, Florida	2	76		
106	Rene Goulet	April 21, 1981	CWF Show	Tampa, Florida	2	(Note: The date the championship was lost is uncertain, which means that the reign lasted between 41 and 70 days.)		
107	Bobby Jaggers	June 1981	CWF Show	Tampa, Florida	1	(Note: The date the championship was won is uncertain, which means that the reign lasted between 145 and 174 days.)		
108	Jack Brisco	November 22, 1981	CWF Show	Orlando, Florida	4	34		
109	David Von Erich	December 26, 1981	CWF Show	St. Petersburg, Florida	1	202		
110	Derek Draper	July 16, 1982	CWF Show	Lakeland, Florida	1	9		
111	Sweet Brown Sugar	July 25, 1982	CWF Show	Orlando, Florida	3	17		
112	Jimmy Garvin	August 11, 1982	CWF Show	Florida	2	81		
113	Dusty Rhodes	October 31, 1982	CWF Show	Orlando, Florida	10	22		
114	Kevin Sullivan	November 22, 1982	CWF Show	West Palm Beach, Florida	1	(Note: The date the championship was vacated is uncertain, which means that the reign lasted between 1 and 26 days.)	Defeated Barry Windham to win the championship	
—	Vacated	1982	—	—	—	—	Championship vacant after Sullivan tries to give it to Jake Roberts in gratitude for his interference.	
115	Barry Windham	December 18, 1982	CWF Show	Sarasota, Florida	1	89	Defeated Greg Valentine in tournament final	
116	Frank Dusek	March 17, 1983	CWF Show	Tampa, Florida	1	44		
117	Ron Bass	April 30, 1983	CWF Show	Ft. Myers, Florida	1	147		
118	Mike Rotunda	September 24, 1983	CWF Show	St. Petersburg, Florida	1	60		
119	Ron Bass	November 23, 1983	CWF Show	Miami, Florida	2	180		
120	Mike Rotunda	May 21, 1984	CWF Show	West Palm Beach, Florida	2	9		
121	Angelo Mosca	May 30, 1984	CWF Show	Tampa, Florida	1	74		
122	Jim Neidhart	August 12, 1984	CWF Show	Oklahoma City, Oklahoma	1	13		
123	Pez Whatley	August 25, 1984	CWF Show	Sarasota, Florida	1	25		
124	Kevin Sullivan	September 19, 1984	CWF Show	Ft. Lauderdale, Florida	2	3		
125	Pez Whatley	September 22, 1984	CWF Show	Miami, Florida	2	116		
126	Rick Rude	January 16, 1985	CWF Show	Tampa, Florida	1	84	aired on a TV tape delay on January 23, 1985	
127	Brian Blair	April 10, 1985	CWF Show	Tampa, Florida	1	46		
128	Hercules Hernandez	May 26, 1985	CWF Show	Orlando, Florida	1	(Note: The date the championship was vacated is uncertain, which means that the reign lasted between 36 and 56 days.)		
—	Vacated	July 1985	—	—	—	—	Hernandez was fired for a dressing room fight with Wahoo McDaniel	
129	Rick Rude	July 21, 1985	CWF Show	Orlando, Florida	2	73	defeated Mike Graham in tournament final	
130	Wahoo McDaniel	October 2, 1985	CWF Show	Tampa, Florida	2	48		
131	Lex Luger	November 19, 1985	CWF Show	Tampa, Florida	1	57		
132	Jesse Barr	January 15, 1986	CWF Show	Tampa, Florida	1	30		
132	Lex Luger	February 14, 1986	Battle of the Belts II	Orlando, Florida	2	158		
134	Masked Superstar	July 22, 1986	CWF Show	Tampa, Florida	1	7		
135	Lex Luger	July 29, 1986	CWF Show	Tampa, Florida	3	171		
136	Kevin Sullivan	January 16, 1987	CWF Show	Daytona, Florida	3	15		
137	Bad News Allen	January 31, 1987	CWF Show	Ft. Lauderdale, Florida	1	25		
138	Kevin Sullivan	February 25, 1987	CWF Show	Ft. Lauderdale, Florida	4	(Note: The date the championship was abandoned is uncertain, which means that the reign lasted between 4 and 34 days.)		
—	Deactivated	March 1987	—	—	—	—	Championship abandoned after promotion was purchased by Jim Crockett Promotions	

== See also ==
- List of National Wrestling Alliance championships
- NWA Southern Heavyweight Championship (Georgia version)
- NWA Southern Heavyweight Championship (Tennessee version)
