= NWA United States Heavyweight Championship (Central States version) =

Professional wrestling championship

NWA United States Heavyweight Championship (Central States)

Details
- Promotion: Central States Wrestling
- Date established: August 24, 1961
- Date retired: July 1970
Statistics
- First champion: Pat O'Connor
- Most reigns: Ron Etchison (7 reigns)
- Longest reign: Pat O'Connor (315 days) (Note: Due to gaps in record keeping it is possible that someone else has held the championship for longer but that cannot be verified.)
- Shortest reign: Rocky Hamilton (7 days)

The NWA Central States United States Championship was the version of the NWA United States Heavyweight Championship that was defended in the Central States Wrestling territory around Missouri. It existed from 1961 until 1970. Records indicate that Bob Orton, The Viking and The Destroyer also held championship but no specific dates were found for those reigns.

== Title History ==
Key
No.	Overall reign number
Reign	Reign number for the specific champion
Days	Number of days held

No.	Champion	Championship change			Reign statistics		Notes	Ref.
No.	Champion	Date	Event	Location	Reign	Days	Notes	Ref.
1	Pat O'Connor	August 24, 1961	N/A	N/A	1	315	Awarded	
2	Hans Schmidt	July 5, 1962	JCP show	Greensboro, North Carolina	1	77		
3	Pat O'Connor	August 16, 1962	JCP show	Greensboro, North Carolina	2	78		
4	Lee Henning	November 2, 1962	CSW show	St. Joseph, Missouri	1	14	This was a Best Two Out Of Three Falls match.	
5	Pat O'Connor	November 16, 1962	CSW show	St. Joseph, Missouri	3	114	This was a Best Two Out Of Three Falls match.	
6	Bob Orton Sr.	March 10, 1963	CSW show	Cedar Rapids, Iowa	1	154		
7	Pat O'Connor	August 11, 1963	CSW show	Cedar Rapids, Iowa	4	69		
8	Rocky Hamilton	October 19, 1963	CSW show	Waterloo, Iowa	1	(Note: The date the championship was won has not been documented which means the championship reign lasted anywhere between 42 days and 73 days)		
9	Rock Hunter	December 1963	CSW show	Missouri	1	(Note: The date the championship was won has not been documented which means the championship reign lasted anywhere between 34 days and 89 days)		
10	Rocky Hamilton	February 4, 1964	CSW show	Waterloo, Iowa	2	95		
11	Sonny Myers	May 9, 1964	CSW show	Waterloo, Iowa	1	42		
12	Bob Geigel	June 20, 1964	CSW show	Waterloo, Iowa	2	119		
13	Bob Orton Sr.	October 17, 1964	CSW show	Waterloo, Iowa	2	14		
14	The Lawman	October 31, 1964	CSW show	Waterloo, Iowa	1	21		
15	Rocky Hamilton	November 21, 1964	CSW show	Waterloo, Iowa	3	7		
16	Tom Clark	November 28, 1964	CSW show	N/A	1	35		
17	Sonny Myers	January 2, 1965	CSW show	Waterloo, Iowa	2	(Note: The date the championship was won has not been documented which means the championship reign lasted anywhere between 10 days and 26 days)		
18	Tom Clark	January 1965	CSW show	Waterloo, Iowa	2	(Note: The date the championship was won has not been documented which means the championship reign lasted anywhere between 2 days and 19 days)		
19	Sonny Myers	January 31, 1965	CSW show	Cedar Rapids, Iowa	3	14		
20	Rocky Hamilton	February 14, 1965	CSW show	Waterloo, Iowa	4	(Note: The date the championship was won has not been documented which means the championship reign lasted anywhere between 16 day and 45 days)		
—	Vacated	March 1965	—	—	—	—	Championship vacated for undocumented reasons	
21	Bobby Shane	March 21, 1965	CSW show	Waterloo, Iowa	1	28	Defeated Rocky Hamilton	
22	Rocky Hamilton	April 18, 1965	CSW show	Waterloo, Iowa	5	(Note: The date the championship was won has not been documented which means the championship reign lasted anywhere between 55 days and 79 days)		
—	Vacated	1965	—	—	—	—	Vacated sometime between June 12 to July 6	
23	Rocky Hamilton	July 10, 1965	CSW show	Waterloo, Iowa	6	7	Defeated Ron Etchison in the finals of a 10 man tournament	
24	Ron Etchison	July 17, 1965	CSW show	Waterloo, Iowa	1	28		
25	The Stomper	August 14, 1965	CSW show	Waterloo, Iowa	1	112		
26	Bobby Shane	December 4, 1965	CSW show	Waterloo, Iowa	3	175		
27	Bob Brown	February 5, 1966	CSW show	Cedar Rapids, Iowa	2	42		
28	Bobby Shane	March 19, 1966	CSW show	Waterloo, Iowa	3	8		
29	The Viking	March 27, 1966	CSW show	Waterloo, Iowa	1	189		
30	Pat O'Connor	October 2, 1966	CSW show	Cedar Rapids, Iowa	5	238	This was a Best Of Two Out Of Three Falls match.	
31	Jack Donovan	May 27, 1967	CSW show	Waterloo, Iowa	1	105		
32	Ron Etchison	September 9, 1967	CSW show	Waterloo, Iowa	2	35		
33	Jack Donovan	October 14, 1967	CSW show	Waterloo, Iowa	2	29		
34	Ron Etchison	November 12, 1967	CSW show	Cedar Rapids, Iowa	3	126		
35	Destroyer (Stan Pulaski)	March 17, 1968	CSW show	Waterloo, Iowa	1	13		
36	Ron Etchison	March 30, 1968	CSW show	Waterloo, Iowa	4	14		
37	Destroyer	April 13, 1968	CSW show	Waterloo, Iowa	2	43		
38	Ron Etchison	May 26, 1968	CSW show	Cedar Rapids, Iowa	5	62		
39	Roger Kirby	July 27, 1968	CSW show	Waterloo, Iowa	1	35		
40	Eddie Sharkey	August 31, 1968	CSW show	Waterloo, Iowa	1	35		
41	Ron Etchison	October 5, 1968	CSW show	Cedar Rapids, Iowa	5	35		
42	Dick Murdoch	November 9, 1968	CSW show	Waterloo, Iowa	1	126		
—	Vacated	February 8, 1969	—	—	—	—	Held up following a match against Earl Hayward	
43	Dick Murdoch	February 15, 1969	CSW show	Waterloo, Iowa	2	119	Murdoch defeated Earl Maynar in a Lumberjack match for the vacant title.	
44	Ron Etchison	June 14, 1969	CSW show	Cedar Rapids, Iowa	6	14		
45	Dick Murdoch	June 28, 1969	CSW show	Waterloo, Iowa	3	49		
46	Luke Brown	August 16, 1969	CSW show	Waterloo, Iowa	1	(Note: The date the championship was won has not been documented which means the championship reign lasted anywhere between 45 days and 76 days)		
47	K.O. Cox	October 1969	CSW show	Waterloo, Iowa	1	(Note: The date the championship was won has not been documented which means the championship reign lasted anywhere between 59 days and 88 days)		
48	Ron Etchison	December 28, 1969	CSW show	Waterloo, Iowa	7	48		
49	Roger Kirby	February 14, 1970	CSW show	Waterloo, Iowa	2	112		
50	The Viking	June 6, 1970	CSW show	Waterloo, Iowa	2	(Note: The date the championship was won has not been documented which means the championship reign lasted anywhere between 24 days and 55 days)		
—	Deactivated	July 1970	—	—	—	—	Championship abandoned	

== Combined reigns ==
¤	The exact length of at least one title reign is uncertain, so the shortest possible length is used.

Rank	Wrestler	No. of reigns	Combined days
1	Pat O'Connor	3	252¤
2	The Sheik	1	215¤
3	Bob Geigel	2	147¤
4	Rocky Hamilton	2	113¤
5	The Stomper	3	64¤
6	Sonny Myers	2	20¤
7	Enrique Torres	1	7
8	Jack Donovan	2	2¤
9	Tom Clark	1	2¤
10	"Bulldog" Bob Brown	1	1¤
11	Bobby Shane	1	1¤
12	Eddie Sharkey	1	1¤
13	Rock Hunter	1	1¤
14	Ron Etchison	1	1¤

== See also ==
- National Wrestling Alliance
- Central States Wrestling
