= Hiro Matsuda =

Japanese professional wrestler (1937–1999)

Personal information
- Born: Yasuhiro Kojima; July 22, 1937 Yokohama, Kanagawa, Japan
- Died: November 27, 1999 (aged 62) Tampa, Florida, U.S.
- Cause of death: Colon cancer

Professional wrestling career
- Ring name(s): Ernesto Kojima; Hiro Matsuda
- Billed height: 6 ft 1 in (185 cm)
- Billed weight: 231 lb (105 kg)
- Trained by: Diablo Velasco; Rikidōzan; Karl Gotch
- Debut: 1957
- Retired: 1990

Yasuhiro Kojima (小島 泰弘, Kojima Yasuhiro) (July 22, 1937 – November 27, 1999), best known by his ring name Hiro Matsuda (ヒロ・マツダ, Hiro Matsuda), was a Japanese professional wrestler, trainer, and booker.

== Early life ==
Yasuhiro Kojima (小島 泰弘, Kojima Yasuhiro) was born in Yokohama. He attended Ebara High School in the Ōta ward of Tokyo, where he was an ace pitcher on the baseball team.

== Professional wrestling career ==
After graduating high school, Kojima joined Rikidōzan's Japan Pro Wrestling in 1957, but left in 1960 due to his dissatisfaction with the highly-hierarchical nature of the Japanese wrestling scene. Kojima then went to Peru, where he worked as Ernesto Kojima. Later, after moving to Mexico through the United States, the ring name was changed to Kojima Saito, Great Matsuda, and eventually Hiro Matsuda. The name “Matsuda” was a ring name given to two Japanese wrestlers active in the mainland of America, “Sorakichi Matsuda” in the 1880s and Manjiro "Matty" Matsuda in the 1920s.

When wrestling in Mexico, he had matches against the legendary luchador El Santo, and he later studied with Karl Gotch in the United States in order to learn catch-as-catch-can and submission wrestling. During this period he learned one of his finishing maneuvers, the German suplex hold. Kojima adopted his Hiro Matsuda identity while competing in the southern United States, inspired by earlier wrestlers Sorakichi Matsuda and Matty Matsuda. Over this period he would also wrestle occasionally in Japan, where he formed a tag team with Antonio Inoki.

Matsuda was the first ethnically-Japanese wrestler to win a National Wrestling Alliance world singles title when he won its Junior Heavyweight Championship on July 11, 1964, in Tampa, Florida by defeating Danny Hodge, which he held until dropping it on November 13 to Angelo Savoldi. On December 10, Matsuda's match against NWA World Heavyweight Champion Lou Thesz in Jacksonville, Florida, ended without a winner as a result of a time limit draw. He would win a second title in 1975 by defeating Ken Mantell, also later losing the belt to Hodge, whom he had a series of matches with. In the late 60s, Matsuda worked as part of a tag team with The Missouri Mauler, facing heels Rip Hawk and Swede Hanson.

Matsuda settled in Florida in 1962 and trained neophytes at the old Sportatorium in Tampa, home of the Championship Wrestling from Florida television program. Matsuda was famous for being very stiff with his trainees to toughen them up. His most famous student was Hulk Hogan, breaking his leg to show the seriousness of professional wrestling. Matsuda wouldn't let wrestlers train with him unless they did 1,000 pushups and 1,000 squats. Matsuda could also do hundreds of push-ups and squats in his 60s. Other wrestlers he trained included B. Brian Blair, Bob Orton Jr., Dick Slater, Hercules, Mike Graham, Paul Orndorff, Riki Choshu, Ron Simmons, Lex Luger, Scott Casey, Scott Hall, Ted DiBiase and The Great Muta.

In 1987, he began working with Jim Crockett Promotions as a heel to participate in a feud between his disciple Lex Luger and Dusty Rhodes. During the feud, he was billed as "The Master of the Japanese Sleeper," a sleeper hold. During a match within the feud, Matsuda locked Johnny Weaver, who was in Rhodes' corner for one of the matches, in the hold, and the prolonged application of the hold caused Weaver to bleed profusely from the mouth. In the coming years, Matsuda worked for World Championship Wrestling as the manager in early 1989 for the Yamasaki Corporation (a renamed Four Horsemen) as well as working with Terry Funk's stable, The J-Tex Corporation, as their business agent from Japan. His last match was against Osamu Kido at the age of 53 on December 26, 1990, in Hamamatsu, Japan, in an event that also featured Lou Thesz, who also wrestled his last professional match, and Nick Bockwinkel.

== Death ==
Kojima died at his home in Tampa, Florida, on November 27, 1999, of colon cancer and liver cancer; he was 62 years old.

== Championships and accomplishments ==
- Championship Wrestling from Florida
  - NWA Florida Tag Team Championship (4 times) - with Mr. Wrestling (1), Bob Orton (1), and the Missouri Mauler (2)
  - NWA Southern Heavyweight Championship (Florida version) (4 times)
  - NWA World Junior Heavyweight Championship (2 times)
  - NWA World Tag Team Championship (Florida Version) (5 times) - with Duke Keomuka (4) and Dick Steinborn (1)
- Georgia Championship Wrestling
  - NWA Columbus Heavyweight Championship (1 time)
- Japan Wrestling Association
  - All Asia Tag Team Championship (1 time) - with Michiaki Yoshimura
- New Japan Pro-Wrestling
  - NWA North American Tag Team Championship (Los Angeles/Japan version) (1 time) - with Masa Saito
  - Greatest 18 Club inductee
- NWA Mid-America
  - NWA World Tag Team Championship (Mid-America Version) (1 time) - with Kanji Inoki
- Mid Atlantic Championship Wrestling
  - NWA Mid-Atlantic Southern Heavyweight Championship (1 time)
- Professional Wrestling Hall of Fame
  - Class of 2018
- WWE
  - WWE Hall of Fame (Class of 2018)
- Tokyo Sports
  - Service Award (1999)
