= Bobby Shane =

American professional wrestler (1945-1975)

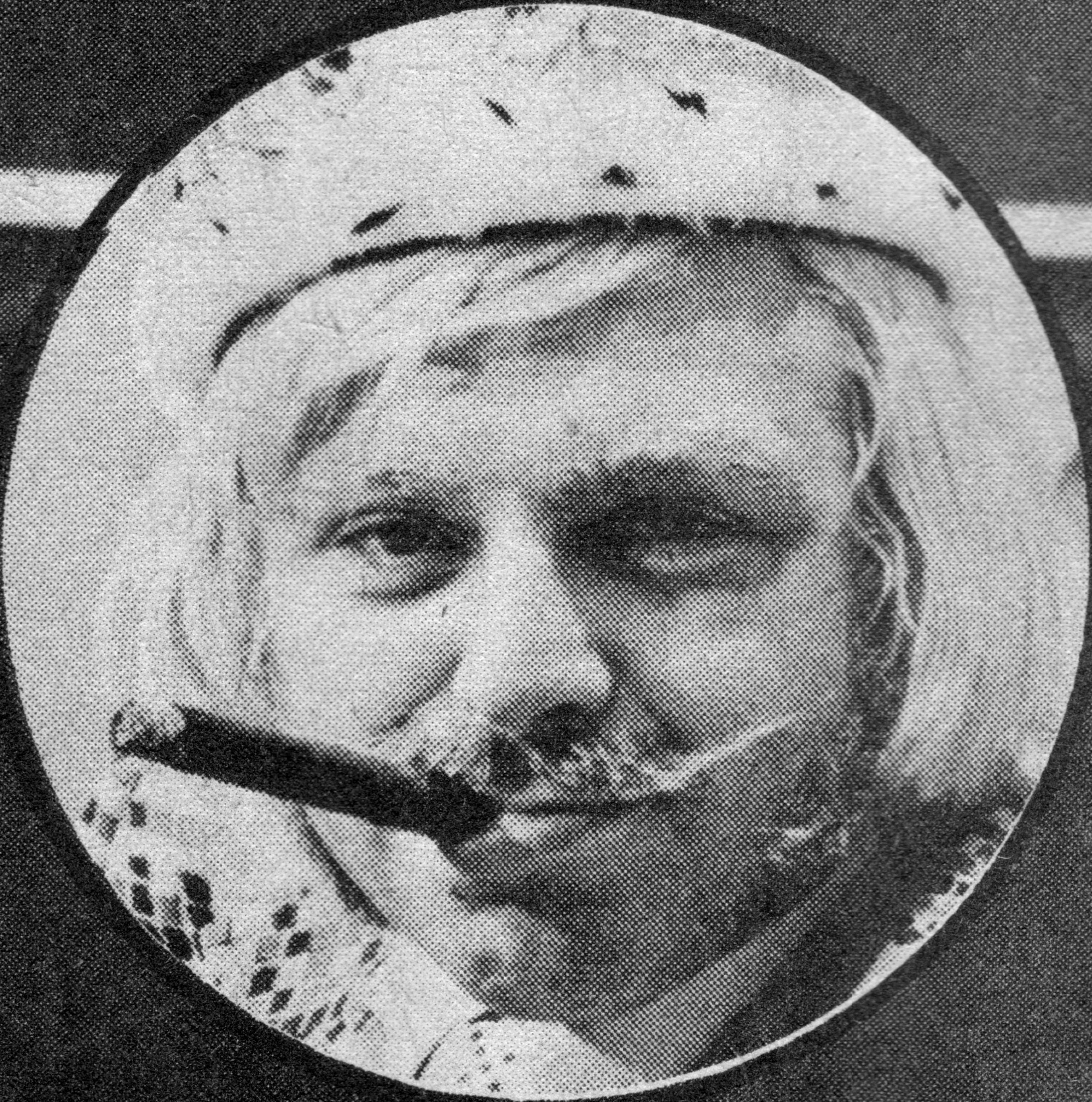
- Shane, circa early 1970s

Personal information
- Born: Robert Lee Schoenberger; August 25, 1945 St. Louis, Missouri, U.S.
- Died: February 20, 1975 (aged 29) Tampa, Florida, U.S.

Professional wrestling career
- Ring name(s): Bobby Shane; Bobby Schoen; The Challenger
- Billed height: 5 ft 9 in (175 cm)
- Billed weight: 224 lb (102 kg)
- Trained by: Wild Bill Longson
- Debut: 1963

Robert Lee Schoenberger (August 25, 1945 – February 20, 1975), better known as Bobby Shane, who also wrestled as Bobby Schoen and as The Challenger, was an American professional wrestler known for his time in NWA Florida in the late 1960s and early 1970s. He was a well-known "heel" in the National Wrestling Alliance and considered a future wrestling star at the time of his death.

== Professional wrestling career ==
The son of St. Louis referee Gus Schoenberger, he started his career in the American Wrestling Association in Minnesota. Eventually winning titles in the Mid-west and Hawaii. By 1968 he went to Georgia where he became popular. In 1970, he was the masked Challenger teaming up with The Professional winning the NWA Georgia Tag Teams titles in a tournament. Later that year he defeated Nick Bockwinkel for the NWA Georgia Television Championship.

In 1971 he moved to the NWA's Florida territory where he became a big name. He won the Florida Southern Heavyweight Championship from George Gaiser, as well as the NWA Florida Television Championship winning it two times from Bob Roop and Tim Woods in 1972. Shane won the NWA Florida Tag Team Championship with Chris Markoff, Bearcat Wright and Gorgeous George, Jr. from 1972–1974. Jack Brisco would have a feud with Shane during his time in Florida. He became known as the "King of Wrestling". In 1974 he went to World Championship Wrestling in Australia and feuded with Mario Milano. Before the plane crash he handed over his crown and cloak to Jerry Lawler to use whilst he was away. Jerry was meant to give these back to Bobby, this of course never happened therefore creating Jerry "The King" Lawler.

== Death ==
On February 20, 1975, Shane was accompanied by Gary Hart, Austin Idol and Buddy Colt, who was piloting the Cessna 182, when they took off from Opa Locka Airport, located in Miami to Peter O. Knight Airport, located in Tampa. The aircraft crashed into the Tampa Bay following a stall after Colt attempted a go-around. Amidst the crash, the Tampa Police Department retrieved the aircraft from the water where they found Shane's body and announced that Shane had died from drowning. It is believed his foot was caught in the wreckage of the aircraft. Shane died at 29 years old, and the other wrestlers survived with minor and critical injuries. Hart was thrown from the plane and had suffered serious injuries (broken arm, wrist, knee, back, sternum, collarbone and vertebrae; right eye knocked loose; a partially severed nose; head trauma). Despite this, he managed to locate Idol and swim him to shore, then swim back and rescued Colt. However, swimming out a third time, Hart was unable to find Shane; reportedly he was plagued by the memory and for decades wondered whether he had done everything he could.

== Championships and accomplishments ==
- American Wrestling Association
  - Nebraska Heavyweight Championship (1 time)
- Cauliflower Alley Club
  - Posthumous Award (2006)
- Heart of America Sports Attractions
  - NWA Iowa Tag Team Championship ( 1 time ) - with Ron Etchison
  - NWA United States Heavyweight Championship (Central States version) (3 times)
- Championship Wrestling from Florida
  - NWA Southern Heavyweight Championship (Florida version) (1 time)
  - NWA Florida Television Championship (2 times)
  - NWA Florida Tag Team Championship (3 times) - with Bearcat Wright, Chris Markoff and Gorgeous George, Jr.
- Georgia Championship Wrestling
  - NWA Georgia Heavyweight Championship (1 time)
  - NWA Georgia Television Championship (1 time)
  - City of Mobile Heavyweight Championship (1 time)
  - NWA Georgia Tag Team Championship (2 times) – with Gorgeous George, Jr.
  - NWA Macon Tag Team Championship (1 time) – with Gorgeous George, Jr.
- Gulf Coast Championship Wrestling
  - NWA Alabama Heavyweight Championship (1 time)
- NWA Mid-Pacific Promotions
  - NWA Hawaii Tag Team Championship (1 time) - with Nick Bockwinkel
- Superstar Championship Wrestling
  - SCW Western States Tag Team Championship (1 time) – with Ricky Gibson
- World Championship Wrestling
  - NWA Austra-Asian Tag Team Championship – with The Original Mr. Wrestling

== See also ==
- List of premature professional wrestling deaths
