= Vivian Vachon =

American-Canadian professional wrestler (1951-1991)

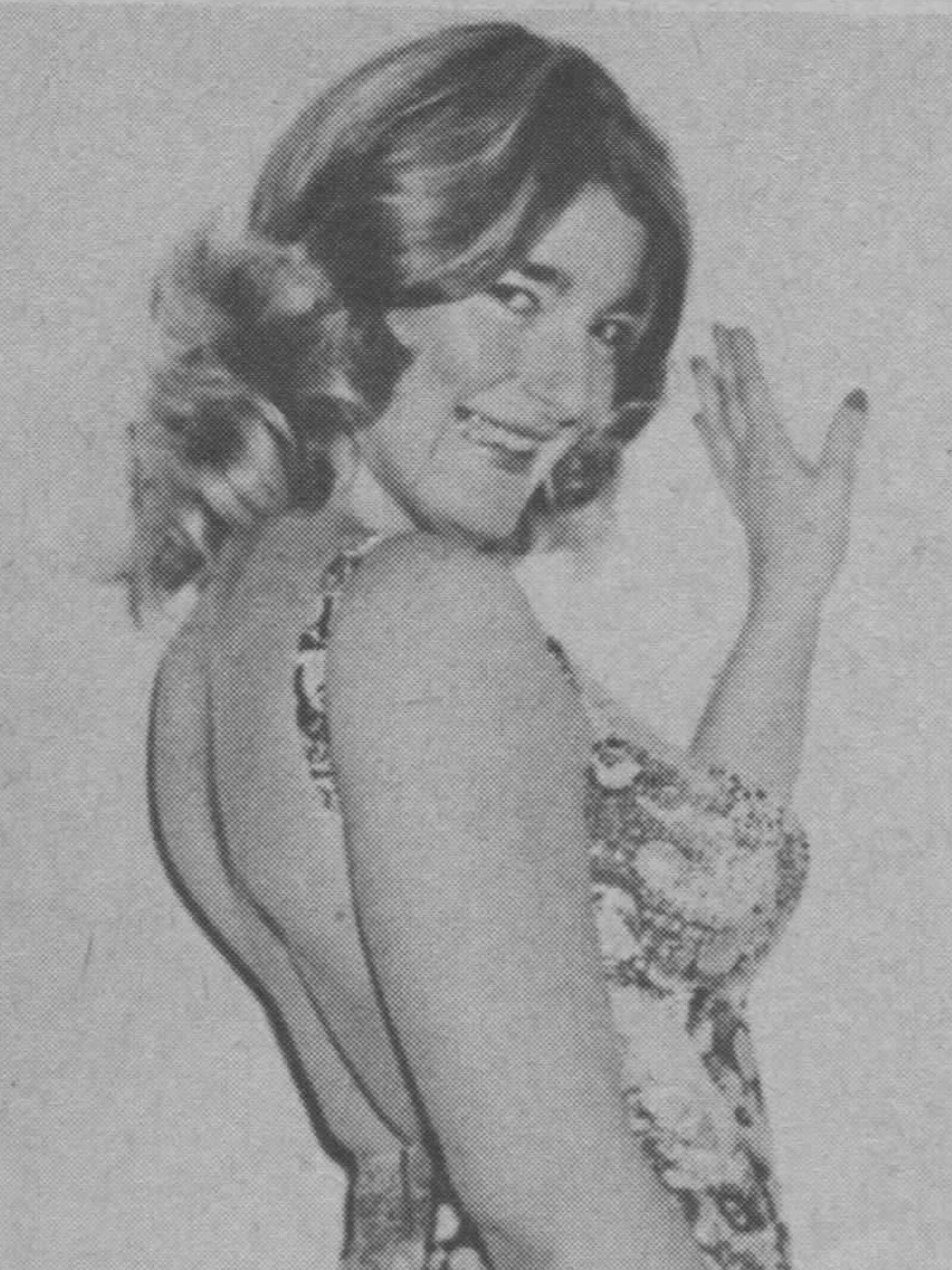
- Vachon, circa 1973

Personal information
- Born: Diane Vachon; 23 January 1951 Newport, Vermont, U.S.
- Died: 24 August 1991 (aged 40) Saint-Jean-sur-Richelieu, Quebec, Canada
- Cause of death: Traffic collision
- Spouses: Buddy Wolfe (m. 1976; div. 1979); Gary Carnegie (m. 1979; div. 1991)
- Children: 2
- Family: Vachon

Professional wrestling career
- Ring name(s): Vivian Vachon; Viviane Vachon; Vivian Vance
- Billed height: 5 ft 7 in (1.70 m)
- Billed weight: 160 lb (73 kg)
- Trained by: Mad Dog Vachon; The Fabulous Moolah
- Debut: 1969
- Retired: 1986

Diane Vachon (January 23, 1951 – August 24, 1991), better known by her ring name Vivian Vachon, was an American-Canadian professional wrestler and singer. A member of the Vachon family of wrestlers, she was the sister of Maurice and Paul Vachon, and the aunt of Luna Vachon. She is considered one of the best female wrestlers of the 1970s.

== Early life ==
Diane Vachon was born on January 23, 1951, in Newport, Vermont, to Canadian parents Ferdinand and Marguerite Vachon, and was part of the Vachon family. The youngest of 13 children, Vachon was raised on a farm near Montreal, Quebec. She left high school following the 10th grade, and briefly attended Constance Brown's Charm School. She later modelled for a short period and worked in an office.

== Professional wrestling career ==
At the suggestion of her brother Maurice, she began to train as a professional wrestler, and went to South Carolina to train under The Fabulous Moolah. It was also Maurice who suggested she adopt the ring name Vivian Vachon (sometimes spelled Viviane Vachon).

In 1969, she wrestled for World Wide Wrestling Federation where she teamed with Bette Boucher feuding with The Fabulous Moolah and Toni Rose. During that same year, she also wrestled in Georgia Championship Wrestling using the ring name Vivian Vance.

In February 1971, she became the California Women's Champion. She became the American Wrestling Association's (AWA) Women's Champion for a time, defeating Kay Noble on November 4, 1971.

In the early 1970s she starred in the movie Wrestling Queen, which also included her brothers and other wrestlers. She also appeared in the surrealist film Sweet Movie (1974), by Serbian filmmaker Dušan Makavejev.

She wrestled in the early 1980s on a tour of Japan, and in 1986 for her brother Maurice's retirement tour. In 2006, she was honored posthumously by the Cauliflower Alley Club.

== Personal life ==
Vachon was a talented singer and released a few singles in French.

In July 1976, she married wrestler Buddy Wolfe, but the couple separated three years later in 1979. That same year in November, she married Canadian Armed Forces member Gary Carnegie, with whom she had two children, Ian (born 1980) and Julie Lynn (1982-1991). Vachon and Carnegie divorced in 1991.

=== Death ===
Vachon and her nine-year-old daughter Julie died in a car accident on August 24, 1991. They were hit by a drunk driver who had run a stop sign in Mont-Saint-Grégoire at the corner of Route 104 and Rang de la Montagne.

== Championships and accomplishments ==
- American Wrestling Association
  - AWA World Women's Championship (1 time)
- Cauliflower Alley Club
  - Posthumous Award (2006)
- National Wrestling Alliance
  - NWA Texas Women's Championship (1 time)
- Professional Wrestling Hall of Fame
  - Class of 2015
- Other titles
  - California Women's Championship (1 time)
  - GPW Women's Championship (1 time)

== See also ==
- List of premature professional wrestling deaths
