= Mr. Wrestling =

American professional wrestler (1934–2002)

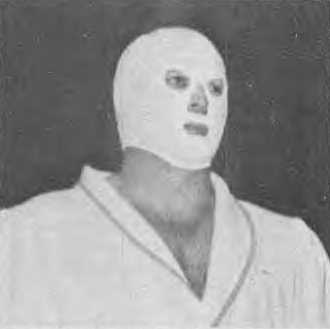
- Woodin as Mr. Wrestling in 1978

Personal information
- Born: George Burrell Woodin; July 28, 1934 Utica, New York, U.S.
- Died: November 30, 2002 (aged 68) Charlotte, North Carolina, U.S.
- Cause of death: Myocardial infarction
- Education: Cornell University; Michigan State University

Professional wrestling career
- Ring name(s): Mr. Wrestling; Tim Woods
- Billed height: 6 ft 0 in (1.83 m)
- Billed weight: 230 lb (100 kg)
- Debut: 1962
- Retired: 1983

George Burrell Woodin (July 28, 1934 – November 30, 2002) was an American professional wrestler, better known by his ring names, Mr. Wrestling .

== Collegiate wrestling career ==
Woodin received a degree in agricultural engineering from Cornell University and a degree in mechanical engineering from Michigan State University.

Before becoming a professional wrestler, Woodin was a successful collegiate wrestler. While wrestling for the Michigan State Spartans, Woodin won two Big Ten titles in 1958 and 1959. He also finished second in the NCAA tournament in 1958 and 1959.

As a junior at Michigan State, Woodin won the 1958 Big Ten 177-pound title by pinning Gary Kurdelmeier of the University of Iowa at 8:21. A couple of weeks later, the two met again in the 177-pound finals of the 1958 NCAAs at the University of Wyoming, where Woodin lost to Kurdelmeier 6-2.

As a senior, Woodin defeated Iowa's Gordon Trapp 6–4 in the heavyweight finals to win his second Big Ten title. At the 1959 NCAAs, the Michigan State Spartan competed in the 191-pound class, making it to the finals for the second year in a row, but lost 9-5 to Syracuse's Art Baker. With his two runner-up finishes at the national championships, Woodin was a two-time NCAA All-American.

== Professional wrestling career ==
Woodin began his wrestling career in 1962 at the age of 28 using the name "Tim Woods". He wrestled in the World Wide Wrestling Federation in the northeast from 1963 to 1964, at the upper end of the preliminary wrestlers. In 1965, he was then given the name "Mr. Wrestling" by Nebraska promotor Joe Dusek, and subsequently adopted both a white wrestling mask and white singlet to complete the character. Mr. Wrestling became a major superstar in the Georgia, Florida, Texas and Mid-Atlantic territories. Starting in the Seventies, he would alternate between his masked persona as Mr. Wrestling and wrestling unmasked as Tim Woods, depending on the territory.

In 1968, Woodin faced street fighter Arnold Spurlin, a former Golden Gloves champion, in a shoot fight in Columbus, Georgia. After Woodin dominated the match, using non-wrestling moves and blows with his fists, Spurlin bit down on the only thing he could to stop the melee - Woodin’s finger. As Woodin danced around Spurlin in pain and trying to remove his finger from his opponent’s grip, other wrestlers entered the ring and began beating Spurlin. Spurlin’ s friends then joined in with knives in hand to run off the wrestlers. As they did, Spurlin spit Woodin’s finger joint across the ring. The finger was subsequently surgically reattached, but Woodin did not regain full use of it. Later that year, Woodin challenged NWA World Heavyweight Champion Gene Kiniski, with the bout being stopped after Woodin's finger began bleeding.

=== 1975 plane crash ===
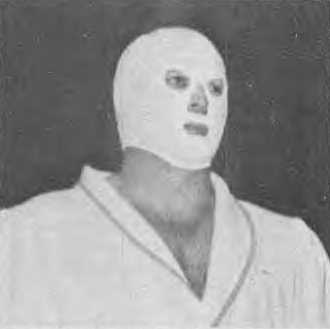
Woods masked as Mr Wrestling, c. 1978

Woodin was involved in the same 1975 plane crash which involved pilot Joseph Michael Farkas (he ended up in a coma and died the next year), wrestling legend Johnny Valentine (broke his back and bone fragments impacted into his spinal cord, which ended his career), wrestler Bob Bruggers (broke his back and had a steel rod put in; Bruggers could have made a comeback, but he decided to retire), future legend Ric Flair (broke his back, but recovered and returned to wrestling), and Jim Crockett Promotions' announcer David Crockett. At the hospital, Woodin gave them his real name (George Burrell Woodin), and told them that he was a promoter. Since Woodin wrestled under the name Tim Woods, a newspaper article in the Charlotte Observer listed his name as his real name, George Burrell Woodin, and mentioned that he was a promoter. Woodin was the only fan favorite wrestler on the plane, while the rest wrestled as villains, and this was back in the days when kayfabe was not broken (at the time, Woods was feuding with Flair and Valentine) and heroes and villains were not known to travel together. Eventually, rumors began circulating that Woods was in fact on the plane. Unwilling to risk the exposure of professional wrestling, he got back in the ring two weeks after the crash and was obviously in extreme pain. Flair later said in his book To Be the Man, that he was "more than just Mr. Wrestling that day, but was the man who saved wrestling."

=== Retirement ===
Woodin retired from professional wrestling in 1983. After retiring, he ran a heating and air conditioning business.

== Personal life ==
Woodin was an avid collector of motorcycles as well as an accomplished photographer and saxophone player.

On November 30, 2002, Woodin died from a heart attack at his home in Charlotte, North Carolina at the age of 68. Before his death, he was scheduled to be interviewed about the October 1975 plane crash for WWE Confidential.

== Championships and accomplishments ==
=== Amateur wrestling ===
- Amateur Athletic Union
  - AAU National Championship (1955, 1957)
- Big Ten Conference
  - Big Ten Conference Championship (1958, 1959)

=== Professional wrestling ===
- All Japan Pro Wrestling
  - Champion Carnival Technique Award (1975)
  - World's Strongest Tag Determination League Fighting Spirit Award (1979) - with The Masked Strangler
- American Wrestling Association
  - AWA Midwest Tag Team Championship (3 times) - with Reggie Parks ( 1 time) Luke Brown (1 time) Ron Reed (1 time)
  - Nebraska Heavyweight Championship (1 time)
- Big Time Promotions
  - Big Time Heavyweight Championship (1 time)
- Cauliflower Alley Club
  - Other honoree (2002)
- Championship Wrestling from Florida
  - NWA Florida Heavyweight Championship (2 times)
  - NWA Florida Tag Team Championship (2 times) - with Hiro Matsuda (1 time) and Big Bad John (1 time)
  - NWA Florida Television Championship (1 time)
  - NWA Southern Heavyweight Championship (Florida version) (4 times)
- George Tragos/Lou Thesz Professional Wrestling Hall of Fame
  - Class of 2001
- Mid-Atlantic Championship Wrestling
  - NWA Mid-Atlantic Tag Team Championship (1 time) - with Dino Bravo
  - NWA Mid-Atlantic Television Championship (1 time)
  - NWA United States Heavyweight Championship (Mid-Atlantic version) (1 time)
  - NWA World Tag Team Championship (Mid-Atlantic version) (1 time) - with Dino Bravo
- Mid-South Sports/Georgia Championship Wrestling
  - NWA Georgia Heavyweight Championship (3 times)
  - NWA Georgia Tag Team Championship (6 times) - with Mr. Wrestling II (4 times), Steve Keirn (1 time) and Thunderbolt Patterson (1 time)
  - NWA Macon Tag Team Championship (2 times) - with Mr. Wrestling II
  - NWA Columbus Heavyweight Championship (1 time)
- NWA Big Time Wrestling
  - NWA American Tag Team Championship (1 time) - with George Scott
  - NWA Texas Heavyweight Championship (1 time)
- NWA Hollywood Wrestling
  - NWA Americas Tag Team Championship (2 times) - with Pak Song (1 time) and Dr. Death (1 time)
  - NWA "Beat the Champ" Television Championship (1 time)
- NWA Mid-America
  - NWA Southern Heavyweight Championship (Memphis version) (1 time)
- Pro Wrestling Illustrated
  - PWI ranked him #394 of the top 500 singles wrestlers during the "PWI Years" in 2003
