= Bob Orton =

American professional wrestler (1929–2006)

Bob Orton Sr.
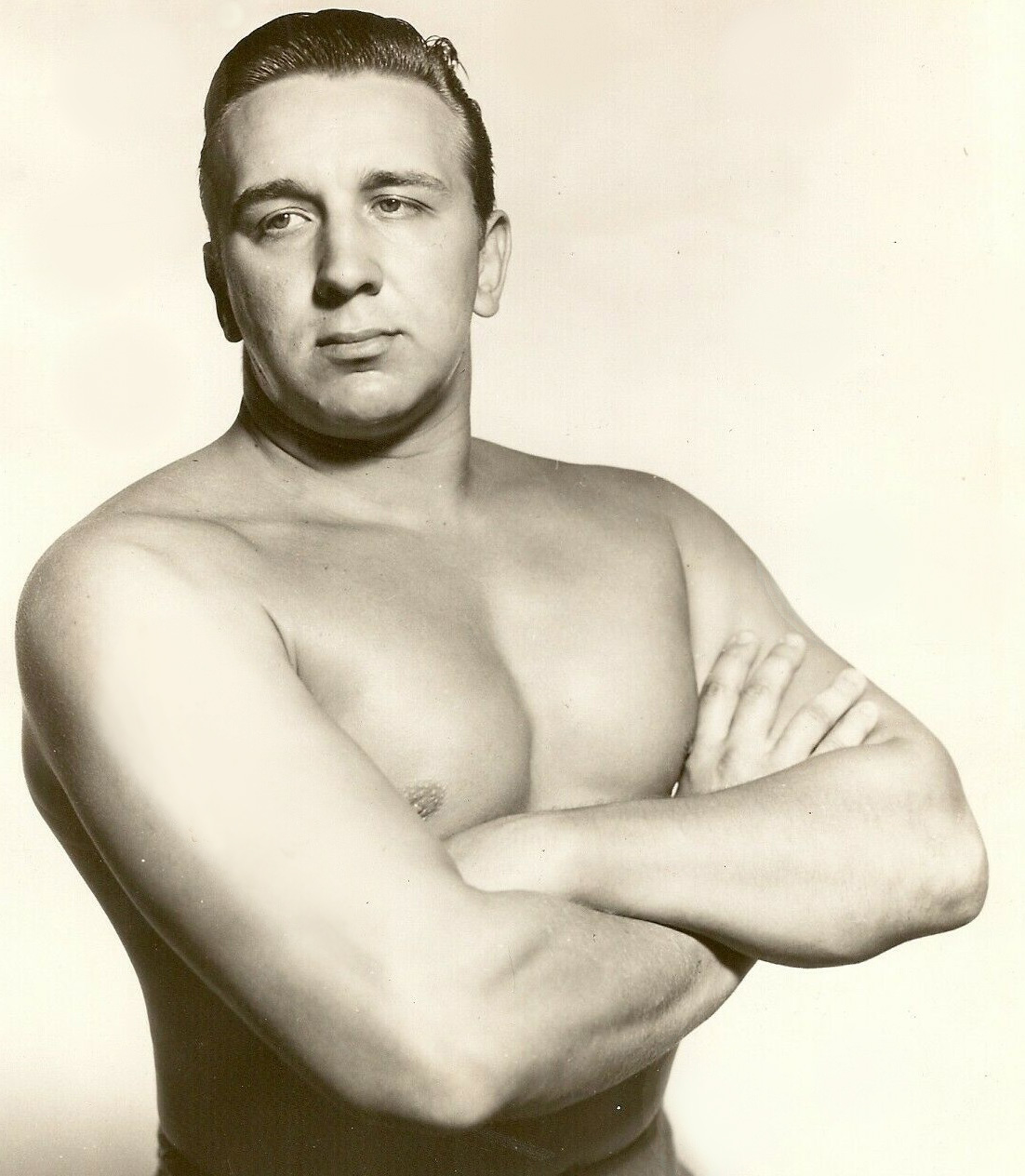
- Orton Sr. in 1954

Personal information
- Born: Robert Keith Orton; July 21, 1929 Kansas City, Missouri, U.S.
- Died: July 16, 2006 (aged 76) Las Vegas, Nevada, U.S.
- Spouse: Rita Orton (m. 1950)
- Children: 3; including Bob Jr. and Barry
- Relative: Randy Orton (grandson)

Professional wrestling career
- Ring name(s): Bob Orton; Bob Orton Sr. El Lobo; Rocky Fitzpatrick; The Zodiak
- Billed height: 6 ft 2 in (1.88 m)
- Billed weight: 245 lb (111 kg)
- Billed from: Kansas City, Missouri
- Debut: 1947
- Retired: 1981

Robert Keith Orton Sr. (July 21, 1929 – July 16, 2006) was an American professional wrestler. The patriarch of the Orton wrestling family, his two sons Bob Orton Jr. and Barry Orton, and grandson Randy Orton, have all wrestled professionally. To distinguish between him and his son, he is known as Bob Orton Sr. Orton Sr. was often referred to by his nickname "The Big O".

== Professional wrestling career ==
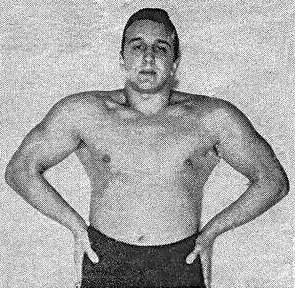
Orton in 1952

Orton Sr. was a two-time holder of the Florida version of the NWA World Tag Team Championship with tag team partner Eddie Graham in 1966. He also innovated the pedigree as he captured several other titles in various National Wrestling Alliance's (NWA) territories with it, including the Florida and Georgia versions of the NWA Southern Heavyweight Championship, as well as the NWA Florida Tag Team Championship (with Bob Orton Jr.) in Florida Championship Wrestling and the NWA United States Heavyweight Championship in Central States Wrestling. He also competed in the American Wrestling Association (AWA), where he would also gain championship success. In 1961, Orton competed for the then NWA Capitol Wrestling Federation (now WWE) teaming with "Nature Boy" Buddy Rogers.

Orton eventually left Capitol Wrestling Corporation in 1962, by competing in other NWA territories. In 1968, Orton returned to Capitol Wrestling Corporation renamed as World Wide Wrestling Federation (WWWF), often using the ring name Rocky Fitzpatrick. In September 1968, as "Cowboy" Rocky Fitzpatrick, he was number one challenger to WWWF World Heavyweight Champion Bruno Sammartino, losing to Sammartino at Madison Square Garden. He fought Sammartino in other northeastern cities as well. In the summer of 1969, Orton wrestled in the Ohio Sports Classics Promotion. During the rest of his career, he worked in Kansas City, St. Louis, California and Florida. He retired in 1981 and spent the last years of his life living in Las Vegas, Nevada.

== Personal life ==
Orton Sr. married his wife Rita on January 22, 1950. Together they had three children: Bob Jr., Barry, and Rhonda. Bob Jr.'s son, Randy Orton, is also a professional wrestler.

Orton and André the Giant were good friends for many years.

== Death ==
Orton Sr. died in Las Vegas, Nevada on July 16, 2006, five days short of his 77th birthday, following multiple heart attacks. He was cremated and had his ashes scattered on Mount Charleston, Nevada in April 2007.

== Championships and accomplishments ==
- American Wrestling Association
  - AWA Midwest Heavyweight Championship (2 times)
  - AWA Midwest Tag Team Championship (3 times) – with Mike DiBiase (1) and Maurice Vachon (2)
  - Nebraska Heavyweight Championship (1 time)
- Cauliflower Alley Club
  - Family Award (2005) – with Barry Orton and Bob Orton Jr.
- Central States Wrestling
  - NWA Central States Heavyweight Championship (2 times)
  - NWA North American Tag Team Championship (Central States version) (1 time) – with Buddy Austin
  - NWA United States Heavyweight Championship (Central States version) (1 time)
- Championship Wrestling from Florida
  - NWA Florida Tag Team Championship (3 times) – with Dennis Hall (1), Hiro Matsuda (1), and Bob Orton Jr. (1)
  - NWA Southern Heavyweight Championship (Florida version) (6 times)
  - NWA World Tag Team Championship (Florida version) (2 times) – with Eddie Graham
- Mid-South Sports
  - NWA Southern Heavyweight Championship (Georgia version) (1 time)
- NWA Big Time Wrestling
  - NWA Texas Tag Team Championship (1 time) – with Lord Alfred Hayes
- NWA Western States Sports
  - NWA Southwest Heavyweight Championship (1 time)
  - NWA Missouri Heavyweight Championship (1 time)
- St. Louis Wrestling Hall of Fame
  - Class of 2019
- Worldwide Wrestling Associates
  - WWA International Television Tag Team Championship (2 times) – with Wild Red Berry
