= Vachon family =

French-Canadian professional wrestling family

The Vachon family is a French-Canadian family long associated with professional wrestling in Canada and the United States, headed by Maurice "Mad Dog" Vachon, his brother Paul "Butcher" Vachon - both longtime NWA and AWA veterans - and their sister Vivian. At one point the Vachons were joined by a storyline brother named "Stan Vachon" who worked with Maurice and Paul Vachon in tag team matches.

In 1975, the family was the subject of a documentary The Wrestling Queen and, in 2007, was featured in World Wrestling Entertainment's The Most Powerful Families in Wrestling. The Vachons are noted to have lived in France in the 17th century. The Vachons have been noted as tough and rough family but they have a very rich history. In 2004, Maurice and Paul Vachon were inducted as a tag team into the Professional Wrestling Hall of Fame and Museum. Vivian Vachon and Luna Vachon were inducted into the Professional Wrestling Hall of Fame and Museum in the Lady Wrestler category in 2015 and 2020 respectively.

== Members ==
- Maurice "Mad Dog" Vachon (1929–2013), wrestled as a successful singles competitor and as a successful tag team competitor with Paul in the AWA and NWA.
- Paul "Butcher" Vachon (1937-2024), professional wrestler, who made his name in American Wrestling Association, National Wrestling Alliance and Georgia Championship Wrestling.
- Vivian Vachon (1951–1991), sister of Paul and Maurice Vachon who appeared with her brothers in the AWA.
- Luna Vachon (1962–2010), step-daughter of Paul Vachon, also became a wrestler, most notably in the World Wrestling Federation. She was married to wrestler David Heath, also known as Gangrel.
- Ian Carnegie (b. 1980), son of Vivian Vachon, former amateur wrestler and a member of the Ottawa High Hookers, a leading Canadian professional arm wrestling club.

The Vachon family name has also been adopted by wrestlers unrelated to the family, for instances by Pierre "The Beast" Vachon and Damien "Pitbull" Vachon, Canadian independent wrestlers who present themselves as the sons of Paul Vachon and have wrestled as a tag team in CWA Montreal, Great Canadian Wrestling, the Millennium Wrestling Federation, NWA: Extreme Canadian Championship Wrestling, NWA: New England, and Paulie Gilmore's New World Wrestling.

The Vachons are profiled in the 2019 documentary film Mad Dog and the Butcher (Les Derniers vilains).

== Awards ==
- Canadian Pro-Wrestling Hall of Fame
  - Class of 2025

== Media ==
- The Most Powerful Families in Wrestling. [DVD]. (2007). World Wrestling Entertainment.
