= Maurice Vachon =

Canadian professional and amateur wrestler

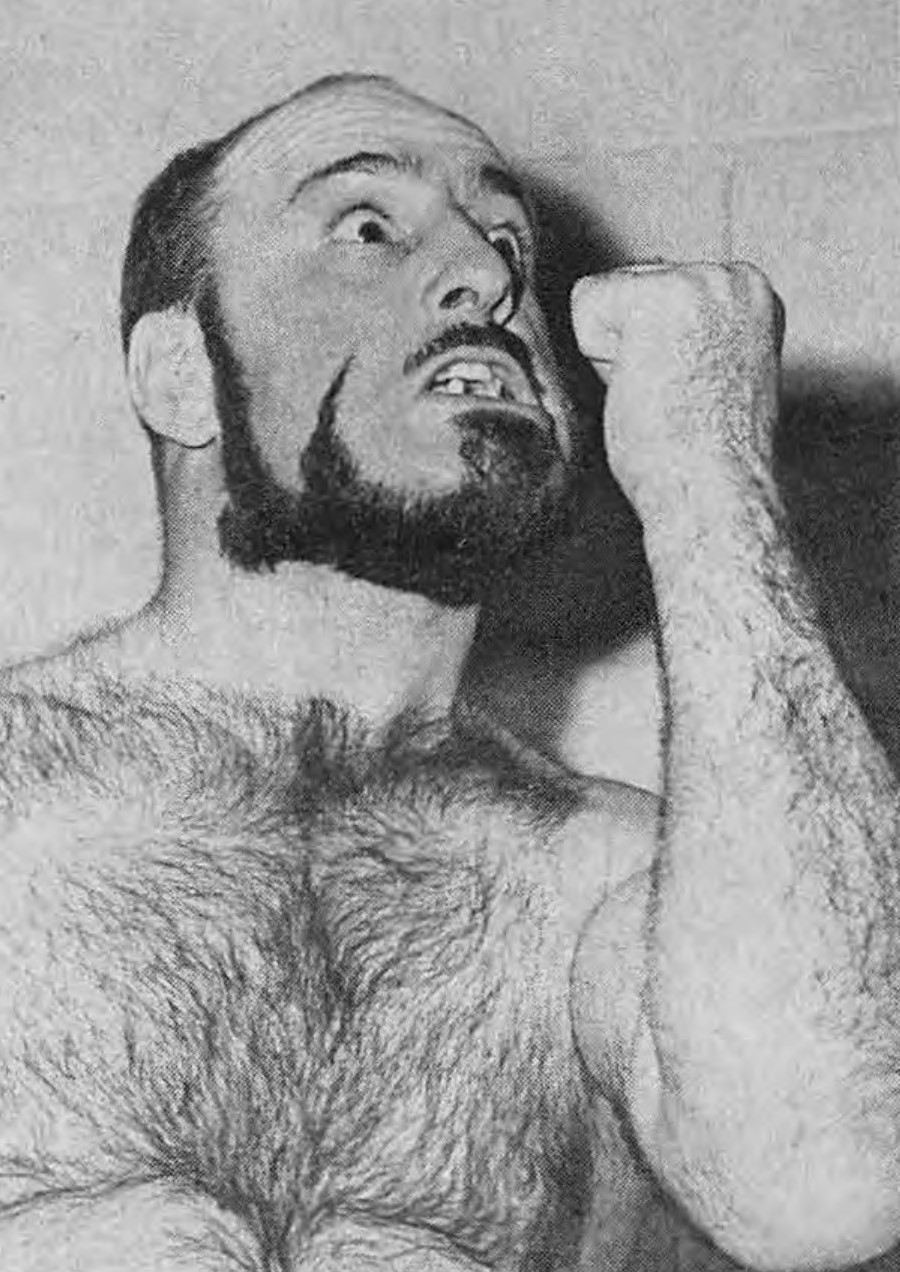
- Vachon, circa 1973
- Born: Joseph Maurice Régis Vachon; 14 September 1929; Montreal, Quebec, Canada
- Died: 21 November 2013 (aged 84); Omaha, Nebraska, U.S.
- Relatives: Paul Vachon (brother); Vivian Vachon (sister); Luna Vachon (niece)
- Family: Vachon
- Professional wrestling career
- Ring name: Mad Dog Vachon
- Billed height: 5 ft 7 in (170 cm)
- Billed weight: 231 lb (105 kg)
- Billed from: Montreal, Quebec, Canada
- Debut: 1950
- Retired: 1986
- Sports career
- Sport: Freestyle wrestling
Medal record
Men's Freestyle wrestling
Representing Canada
British Empire Games
| Gold medal – first place | 1950 Auckland | Middleweight |

Joseph Maurice Régis Vachon (14 September 1929 − 21 November 2013) was a Canadian professional wrestler and freestyle wrestler, best known by his ring name Mad Dog Vachon. He was a member of the Vachon wrestling family, as the older brother of wrestlers Paul and Vivian Vachon, and the uncle of wrestler Luna Vachon.

As an amateur wrestler, Vachon represented Canada at the 1948 Summer Olympics and won a gold medal at the 1950 British Empire Games. He made the switch to professional wrestling and spent time in various promotions in the United States while occasionally teaming with his brother Paul. In Portland, Oregon, he received the name "Mad Dog" Vachon. In the early 1960s, Vachon became a main eventer in the American Wrestling Association. He was one of the promotion's all-time great heels, known for his wild style and intense interviews. He was a five-time AWA World Heavyweight Champion. Starting in the 1970s, Vachon became a fan favourite, particularly in his home province of Quebec.

After a stint in the World Wrestling Federation, Vachon retired from the business in 1986. The following year, he was struck by a hit-and-run driver, resulting in the amputation of one of his legs. Vachon was highly influential, especially in Canada, and was inducted into numerous professional wrestling halls of fame.

== Early life ==
Joseph Maurice Régis Vachon was born on September 14, 1929. His godfather was Maurice Picard, his uncle and the godmother was Victoria Ouellet, his maternal grandmother; he was the second of 13 children of Montreal policeman Ferdinand Vachon and Marguerite Picard. He grew up in the district of Ville-Émard, a working-class borough southwest of Montreal, Quebec. As a child, he regularly attended wrestling shows at the nearby Montreal Forum, where he grew up idolizing local ring legend Yvon Robert; and at just 12 years old, he had already begun grappling at the area's YMCA. At the YMCA he was coached by Frank Saxton, a former coach of the Canadian amateur team. Vachon entered a wrestling course advertised at the back of a comic book, and he began training under Chief Jim Crowley. He trained hard and even worked in the docks and on the canal to build up his muscle.

== Amateur wrestling career ==
By age 14, Vachon had established himself among Canada's premier amateur grapplers. A Middleweight, he became Canadian national freestyle champion in May 1947 after defeating Don Trifinov in Athabasca, Alberta. He held that title until 1949.

At the age of 18, he competed in the 1948 Olympic Games in London, where he pinned the Indian champion in 54 seconds. Vachon ultimately finished in seventh place at 174 pounds after losing to eventual silver medalist Adil Candemir of Turkey. Moreover, it was at the 1948 Olympics where Vachon first encountered an American Greco-Roman competitor named Verne Gagne. He rebounded to win the gold medal in the Middleweight 82 kg event at the 1950 British Empire Games in New Zealand. He then spent several years working as a bouncer at a Montreal nightclub, where he gained a reputation of being willing to fight anyone, before he was encouraged to join the pro wrestling circuit in 1951.

== Professional wrestling career ==
=== Early career (1950–1955) ===
Vachon debuted as a junior heavyweight for Ontario booker Larry Kasaboski's Northland Wrestling Enterprises (NWE) promotion. In his first pro year, he won a tournament in Sudbury to become the initial NWE North American Junior Heavyweight Championship. He soon encountered a roadblock when powerful Montreal promoter Eddie Quinn hesitated to use him for fear that he would dethrone Yvon Robert, who was still his top draw. Consequently, Vachon took to the road and, in April 1955, he teamed with Pierre LaSalle to capture the National Wrestling Alliance (NWA) Texas Tag Team Championship.

=== "Mad Dog" Vachon (1955-1964) ===
Despite his exceptional grappling ability, Vachon nonetheless struggled to distinguish himself from the myriad of image-less grapplers during his early years. As a result, he soon took radical measures to differentiate his persona, bulking up to a more plausible 225 pounds while also shaving his head bald and growing a long goatee. In addition, Vachon would frequently buy local TV time prior to a weekend event, which he then used to boldly proclaim his supremacy while also deprecating his opponent. Such acts of bravado were considered revolutionary at the time, though it was successful in that it attracted attention to Vachon's new character as well as drawing additional fans to the arena. As a result, Vachon subsequently established himself as a major heel while also portraying a wrestling beast inside the ring who would freely stomp, bite, and pound his opponent into submission. According to Vachon, the name "Mad Dog" was given to him in 1962 by Portland promoter Don Owen after a particularly violent match. "During the match I went outside the ring and started to turn everything upside down. A policeman tried to stop me and I hit him too," said Vachon. Afterwards Owen told him, "You just looked like a real mad dog out there."

Before long, "Mad Dog" Vachon consequently developed a reputation as perhaps the most feared rulebreaker in all of wrestling. Furthermore, Maurice's younger brother Paul - ultimately known as "The Butcher" - soon also made his debut and on February 17, 1959, the Vachon brothers teamed to defeat Chico Garcia and Chet Wallick for the NWA Canadian Tag Team Titles. Vachon's tendency to hurt his opponents with foreign objects, filed fingernails and teeth, and the multiple use of his signature finishing move, the piledriver, to end matches made him notorious in the business and caused him to be banned in three U.S. states. But it also made his popularity soar among the fans.

He also met his future wife Kathie Joe at a wrestling event, after spitting a shoe string he had used for choking his opponent at her, as she was sitting in the audience.

=== AWA World Heavyweight Champion (1964–1970) ===
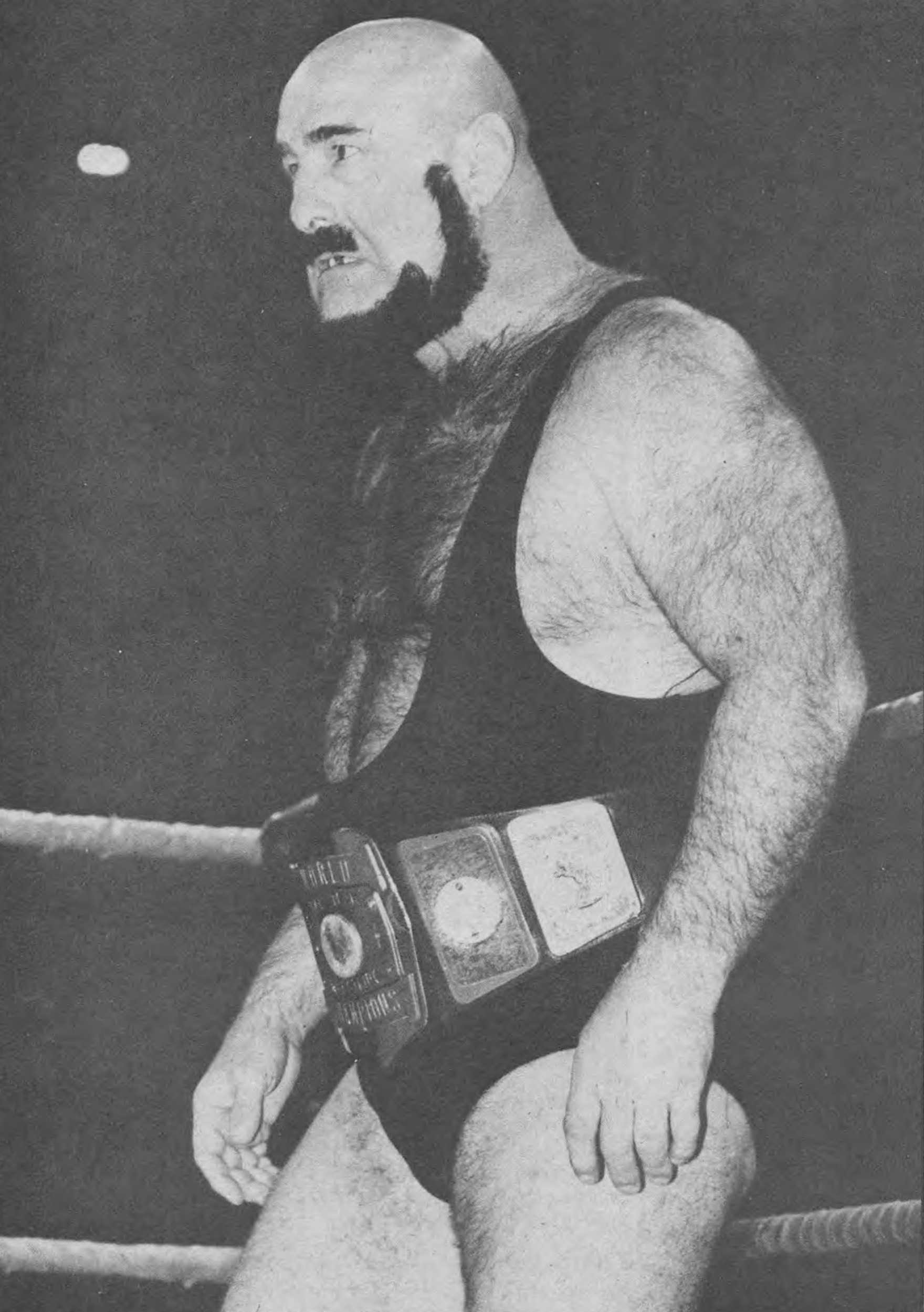
Vachon as AWA World Heavyweight champion

In 1964, Mad Dog Vachon was then recruited to the Minnesota-based American Wrestling Association by his old Olympics acquaintance, Verne Gagne, who had replaced Tony Stecher as the region's chief promoter in 1960 and who also served as its centerpiece champion. Upon debuting, Vachon immediately established himself among the promotion's top box-office draws as fans despised his vicious, mauling tactics; and he thus made the perfect opponent for the All-American Gagne, as the two rivals soon commenced an ongoing battle that would persist on for nearly 20 years. On May 2, 1964, Vachon stunned audiences when he upset Gagne for the AWA World Heavyweight Title, and although Gagne regained the belt just two weeks later, Mad Dog again recaptured the title when he defeated Gagne on October 20 in Minneapolis. Between 1964 and 1967, Mad Dog Vachon would ultimately hold five reigns as the AWA World champion while taking on all comers within the promotion's massive territory, including Gagne, Mighty Igor Vodic, as well as the legendary powerhouse duo of Crusher Lisowski and Dick the Bruiser.

Mad Dog Vachon's final AWA title reign came to an end on February 26, 1967, at the hands of his nemesis Verne Gagne; and he then briefly left the promotion in order to return to his native Montreal territory, where he captured two reigns as the IWA International Heavyweight champion while feuding against Johnny Rougeau and Hans Schmidt. Moreover, Vachon would also leverage his close friendship with Montreal Canadiens legend Jean Beliveau to convince the authorities of the Montreal Forum to grant him a promoting license (despite the protests of Johnny Rougeau and Bob Langevin, who had taken over the region from Eddie Quinn during the mid-1960s). Nevertheless, Vachon would soon return to the AWA, where he resumed his fierce battles with The Crusher and Dick the Bruiser, regarded by some as the greatest tag team of all time, while forming a highly successful and dangerous tandem with his brother Paul "Butcher" Vachon. On August 30, 1969, the Vachons defeated Crusher and Bruiser for the AWA World Tag Team Titles; and the following year, the two battled again in a famous steel cage match at Chicago's Comiskey Park (where the Vachons again emerged victorious), as their violent fights ultimately served as the precursor for a new brand of sadistic and vicious brawling that would spawn future stars like Abdullah the Butcher, Bruiser Brody, Stan Hansen, and others.

=== AWA, WWF and later career (1970–1986) ===
The Vachon family became prominent in the AWA with sister Vivian dominating the women's scene, while Maurice and Paul ruled the men's division. In the early 1970s he appeared alongside Vivian in the motion picture Wrestling Queen. After two decades as one of wrestling's most evil characters, the fans began to rally behind the "Mad Dog" in the late 1970s when he formed an unexpected and odd friendship with ex-rival Verne Gagne. On July 14, 1973, Vachon had a match with Killer Kowalski for Grand Prix Wrestling at Montreal's Jarry Park. The match drew a crowd of 29,127, which is the largest wrestling crowd in Quebec history. Prior to the match, Vachon had vowed to commit suicide if he did not win. Following Vachon's victory, the headline of a Montreal newspaper read "Vachon triumphs in front of 30,000 people and gives up on suicide!" The unlikely partners made for an impressive tag team, and on June 6, 1979, they beat Pat Patterson and Ray Stevens to capture the AWA tag titles, which they held for over a year before losing to Jesse Ventura and Adrian Adonis. When the AWA began looking to younger stars like Rick Martel and Curt Hennig, Vachon jumped to the World Wrestling Federation in 1983. While his age and lack of size did not make for a good mix in the emerging "Hulkamania" era, the now-face Vachon was usually included at WWF house shows in the Midwest and Quebec. He wrestled for the WWF in Canada regularly until 1986, and contributed to its French programming schedule with a weekly interview segment titled Le Brunch a Mad Dog. His deal allowed him to work non-WWF events in Canada.

In 1985, he was cornerman for AWA World Champion Rick Martel during several challenges by Boris Zhukov in Canada, getting involved in one match on September 19 in Winnipeg and fighting off Zhukov and his manager, Chris Markoff, after Markoff interfered and helped Zhukov attack Martel. In a Winnipeg steel cage rematch on November 14, Markoff was neutralized, handcuffed to Vachon.

Vachon received a retirement show in his native Montreal in September 1986, and he left the sport as one its most beloved babyfaces after spending almost his entire career as a sadistic heel. His innovative portrayal of a snarling, bloodthirsty monster inspired a myriad of future "psychotic" wrestlers. WWE wrote: "In later years, Mad Dog's legacy was carried on by his niece, the memorably twisted Luna Vachon, and notable brawlers who adopted Vachon's wild ring style like Bruiser Brody and George "The Animal" Steele."

== Influence ==
Vachon was known for his wild personality and uncontrollable character, as well as his unique interview style. "He was the first wrestler to understand the power of television. He was the first wrestler to speak to the camera. That was never done before." said Yves Theriault, who directed a documentary on Vachon in 2009. Vachon was also very influential in his home province of Quebec. Pat LaPrade, author of the Mad Dogs, Midgets and Screw Jobs, a book on Quebec wrestling history, considers Vachon one of the two most important Quebec wrestlers along with Yvon Robert. He added, "[Vachon is] the best-known Quebec wrestler outside of Quebec. A legend."

In the book The Pro Wrestling Hall of Fame: The Canadians, author Greg Oliver ranks Vachon fourth amongst Canadian wrestlers, behind Whipper Billy Watson, Yvon Robert and Killer Kowalski. Vachon was also included in Oliver's book on villainous wrestlers and was ranked fourth.

== Retirement and personal life ==
Upon retiring, Vachon settled in Carter Lake, Iowa with his third wife Kathy Joe. Tragedy struck in 1987 when Vachon was struck by a hit-and-run driver, resulting in the amputation of one of his legs. It was later revealed that he had been struck by a developmentally disabled male driving the country roads looking for cans to recycle while Vachon was out for a morning jog. The man apparently had no insurance and was never charged. The Vachons moved to Omaha shortly thereafter. He later turned to acting in beer commercials and was a restaurant critic for a Quebec City television station.

Vachon's son Mike wrestled in the 1970s and 1980s in Japan and the United States.

Vachon appeared at the WWF pay-per-view In Your House 7, that was held in Omaha. He was sitting in the front row near ringside, when his artificial leg was ripped off by wrestler Diesel and used as a weapon by Shawn Michaels. In addition, he and longtime rival The Crusher made an appearance at the 1998 Over the Edge pay-per-view, in a segment where the two legends were mocked by Jerry Lawler, including Lawler trying to steal the artificial leg. Crusher and Mad Dog then punched Lawler out of the ring. He had knee surgery in 2008. On March 27, 2010, he was inducted into the 2010 WWE Hall of Fame by his longtime friend Pat Patterson.

In 2018, he was the first inductee into the Nebraska Pro Wrestling Hall of Fame.

== Death ==
Vachon, who in his last years had diabetes and used a wheelchair, died in his sleep on November 21, 2013, at the age of 84. He had six children, 5 grandchildren, and 7 Great Grandchildren .

On November 28, 2018, Vachon was posthumously inducted into the Omaha Pro Wrestling Hall Of Fame at the PWP Live "Wrestlerama" event at The Waiting Room Lounge in Omaha.

== Championships and accomplishments ==
- American Wrestling Association
  - AWA Midwest Tag Team Championship (3 times) - with Bob Orton (2) and Paul Vachon (1)
  - AWA World Heavyweight Championship (5 times)
  - AWA World Tag Team Championship (2 times) - with Paul Vachon (1) and Verne Gagne (1)
  - Nebraska Heavyweight Championship (2 times)
  - Nebraska Tag Team Championship (2 times) - with Haru Sasaki
- Canadian Pro-Wrestling Hall of Fame
  - Class of 2025 - as a member of The Vachons
- Cauliflower Alley Club
  - Iron Mike Mazurki Award (2003)
  - Other honoree (1992)
- Central States Wrestling
  - NWA World Tag Team Championship (Central States Version) (1 time) - with Baron von Raschke
- George Tragos/Lou Thesz Professional Wrestling Hall of Fame
  - Class of 2003
- Lutte Internationale
  - Canadian International Tag Team Championship (1 time) - with Edouard Carpentier
- International Wrestling Association (Montreal)
  - IWA International Heavyweight Championship (2 times)
- International Wrestling Enterprise
  - IWA World Heavyweight Championship (1 time)
  - IWA World Tag Team Championship (1 time) - with Ivan Koloff
- Mid-Atlantic Championship Wrestling
  - NWA Southern Tag Team Championship (Mid-Atlantic version) (1 time) - with Paul Vachon
- Mid-South Sports
  - NWA Southern Heavyweight Championship (Georgia version) (1 time)
  - NWA World Tag Team Championship (Georgia Version) (1 time) - with Paul Vachon
- Nebraska Pro Wrestling Hall of Fame
  - Inaugural Class Inductee (2018)
- Northland Wrestling Enterprises
  - North American Junior Heavyweight Championship (Ontario version)
- Pacific Northwest Wrestling
  - NWA Pacific Northwest Heavyweight Championship (6 times)
  - NWA Pacific Northwest Tag Team Championship (1 time) - with Fritz Von Goering
- Pro Wrestling America
  - PWA Heavyweight Championship (1 time)
- Pro Wrestling Illustrated
  - Ranked No. 166 of the 500 best singles wrestlers during the "PWI Years" in 2003
- Professional Wrestling Hall of Fame and Museum
  - (Class of 2004) - with Paul Vachon
- Quebec Sports Hall of Fame
  - Class of 2009
- Ring Around The Northwest Newsletter
  - Tag Team of the Year (1962) with Fritz Von Goering
  - Wrestler of the Year (1963)
- Southwest Sports, Inc.
  - NWA Brass Knuckles Championship (Texas version) (1 time)
  - NWA Texas Tag Team Championship (3 times) - with Pierre LaSalle (1), Paul Vachon (1), and Duke Keomuka (1)
- Stampede Wrestling
  - NWA Canadian Tag Team Championship (Calgary version) (3 times) - with Paul Vachon
  - NWA International Tag Team Championship (Calgary version) (2 times) - with Paul Vachon
- World Wrestling Entertainment
  - WWE Hall of Fame (Class of 2010)
- Wrestling Observer Newsletter
  - Wrestling Observer Newsletter Hall of Fame (Class of 1996)
