= John Anson =

Canadian professional wrestler (1949–2026)

Personal information
- Born: April 7, 1949 Vancouver, British Columbia, Canada
- Died: August 2026 (aged 77) Sosúa, Dominican Republic
- Website: http://www.grundie.com/john

Professional wrestling career
- Ring name(s): John Anson; Karl Von Schotz; Karl Von Shotz
- Billed height: 6 ft 4 in (1.93 m)
- Billed weight: 290 lb (130 kg)
- Debut: 1966
- Retired: 1983

John Anson (April 7, 1949 – August 2026) was a Canadian professional wrestler, known by his ring name "Handsome" John Anson, who competed in North American and Japanese promotions from the mid-1960s until the early-1980s, including International Wrestling, Maple Leaf Wrestling, NWA All-Star Wrestling, Pacific Northwest Wrestling and Stampede Wrestling.

As Karl Von Schotz, he and Kurt Von Hess were one of the most hated "heels" in the Detroit-area while feuding with Fred Curry and Tony Marino over the NWA World Tag Team Championship during 1973–74.

== Career ==
In 1966, John Anson made his professional debut at age 17 against Ivan Koloff. Leaving Calgary for Maple Leaf Wrestling in 1972, Anson began teaming with Bill Terry as German brothers Karl Von Hess and Karl von Shotz later facing Gino Brito, Tony Parisi and Dominic DeNucci in a six-man tag team match with Hans Schmidt at the All-Star Wrestling Stadium Show at Jarry Park in Montreal, Quebec on August 28, 1972.

Defeating Jacques Rougeau and Gino Brito for the International Tag Team Championship in September, they would remain one of the top tag teams in the promotion regularly appearing at Maple Leaf Gardens between October 1972 and September 1973. They would also wrestle for promoter Ed Farhat in Detroit later that year defeating Ben Justice and The Stomper for the Detroit version NWA World Tag Team Championship on December 9, 1972.

After losing the tag team titles to Fred Curry and Tony Marino that same month, they would feud with Curry and Marino winning the NWA World Tag Team Championship three more times until finally losing the titles to Tony Marino and Bobo Brazil in early 1974. While in the National Wrestling Federation, they would also Win the NWF World Tag Team Championship in May and held the titles until the promotions close later that year. While touring New Japan Pro-Wrestling, he and Von Hess defeating Johnny Powers and Pat Patterson for the NWA North American Tag Team Championship before losing the titles to Antonio Inoki and Seiji Sakaguchi in Los Angeles, California on August 16, 1974.

After he and Terry split up in 1975, he competed in southern Ontario before returning to British Columbia the following year. Defeating Frankie Laine for the Stampede North American Heavyweight Championship in Calgary on February 6, he feuded with Eddie Morrow trading the title with him later that year. Teaming with Don Leo Jonathan while in NWA All-Star Wrestling, he defeated John Quinn and Kinji Shibuya for the NWA Canadian tag Team Championship in Vancouver on September 4, 1976. However, facing his former tag team partner Kurt von Hess, he and Jonathan lost the titles later that month to John Quinn and Kurt von Hess on September 28. Splitting with Don Leo Jonathan after this loss, he and Sky Hi Morse would defeat Don Leo Jonathan and Dutch Savage for the tag team titles on March 7 although the titles were vacated the following month.

Losing the Stampede North American Heavyweight Championship to The Stomper on July 2, 1977, Anson would move on to Pacific Northwest Wrestling where he and Ron Bass defeated Moondog Mayne and Les Thornton for the PNW Tag Team Championship on August 7. Anson would eventually be replaced by Moondog Mayne however, leaving the promotion before the end of the year.

Holding the NWA Hawaii Heavyweight Championship before dropping the title to "Playboy" Buddy Rose while touring Hawaii in early 1978, he would also tour Newfoundland and Japan during the late 1970s. Anson would spend his last years in Stampede Wrestling and Pacific Northwest Wrestling before his retirement in 1983.

He would have a brief stint promoting in Ontario and Newfoundland with Ed Farhat and Jack Kane during the 1980s, although he later opened a marina and resort near Vancouver.

== Death ==
On August 22, 2026, it was reported that Anson had died in Sosúa, where he had lived for the past 25 years. He was 77.

== Championships and accomplishments ==
- Big Time Wrestling
  - NWA World Tag Team Championship (Detroit version) (4 times) – with Karl Von Hess
- International Wrestling
  - International Tag Team Championship (1 time) – with Karl Von Hess
- NWA All-Star Wrestling
  - NWA Canadian Tag Team Championship (Vancouver version) (2 times) - with Don Leo Jonathan (1) and Ski Hi Morse (1)
- NWA Hollywood Wrestling
  - NWA North American Tag Team Championship (Los Angeles/Japan version) (1 time) – with Kurt Von Hess
- NWA Mid-Pacific Promotions
  - NWA Hawaii Heavyweight Championship (1 time)
- National Wrestling Federation
  - NWF World Tag Team Championship (1 time) – with Kurt Von Hess
- Pacific Northwest Wrestling
  - NWA Pacific Northwest Tag Team Championship (1 time) – with Ron Bass
- Stampede Wrestling
  - Stampede North American Heavyweight Championship (2 times)
