= NWA United States Heavyweight Championship (Toronto version) =

Professional wrestling championship

NWA United States Heavyweight Championship (Toronto)

Details
- Promotion: Maple Leaf Wrestling
- Date established: September, 1962
- Date retired: July, 1977
Statistics
- First champion: Johnny Valentine
- Most reigns: Johnny Valentine (7 reigns)
- Longest reign: The Sheik (850 days)
- Shortest reign: Johnny Valentine and Professor Hiro (7 days)
- Oldest champion: The Sheik (52 years, 211 days)
- Youngest champion: Bruno Sammartino (27 years, 47 days)

The NWA Toronto United States Heavyweight Championship was the version of the NWA United States Heavyweight Championship that was defended in Frank Tunney's Toronto-based Maple Leaf Wrestling. It existed from 1962 until 1973. A different version of the title was brought to the territory by The Sheik in 1974 and defended until 1977. After that, Maple Leaf Wrestling recognized the Mid-Atlantic version of the title from May 1978 until July 1984 when promoter Jack Tunney allied himself with the WWF.

== Title history ==
Key
No.	Overall reign number
Reign	Reign number for the specific champion
Days	Number of days held

No.	Champion	Championship change			Reign statistics		Notes	Ref.
No.	Champion	Date	Event	Location	Reign	Days	Notes	Ref.
1	Johnny Valentine	September 1962	MLW show	N/A	1	N/A	Billed as champion on arrival in Toronto	
2	Bruno Sammartino	November 22, 1962	MLW show	Toronto, ON	1	22		
3	Johnny Valentine	December 14, 1962	MLW show	Toronto, ON	2	N/A		
4	John Paul Henning	June 1963	N/A	Washington, DC	1	N/A	Fictitious title change	
5	Johnny Valentine	July 11, 1963	MLW show	Toronto, ON	3	98		
6	The Beast	October 17, 1963	MLW show	Toronto, ON	1	140		
7	Johnny Valentine	March 5, 1964	MLW show	Toronto, ON	4	91		
8	Professor Hiro	June 4, 1964	MLW show	Toronto, ON	1	133		
9	Johnny Valentine	October 15, 1964	MLW show	Toronto, ON	5	7	Won by referee's decision	
10	Professor Hiro	October 22, 1964	MLW show	Toronto, ON	2	8	Won by disqualification	
11	Johnny Valentine	October 30, 1964	MLW show	Toronto, ON	6	58		
12	The Sheik	December 27, 1964	MLW show	Toronto, ON	1	7		
13	Johnny Valentine	January 3, 1965	MLW show	Toronto, ON	7	889	Lost to Antonio Inoki on November 19, 1966 in Osaka, Japan, in a card by the original Tokyo Pro Wrestling; Inoki defended a version of the title until January 31, 1967 when TPW collapsed and was absorbed into International Wrestling Enterprise.	
14	Tiger Jeet Singh	June 11, 1967	MLW show	Toronto, ON	1	2031-2061	Title inactive from 1968 to 1971; recognized as champion again in 1971	
—	Vacated	January 1973	—	Title vacated	—	—	Championship vacated for undocumented reasons	
15	The Sheik	July 1974	N/A	N/A	2	842-872	Defeated Tony Marino on March 16, 1974 to win the Detroit version, recognized in Toronto; defeated previous champion Singh decisively on November 11 to settle the controversy after a match on October 27 ended in a double countout.	
16	Thunderbolt Patterson	November 19, 1976	MLW show	Toronto, ON	1	37		
17	The Sheik	December 26, 1976	MLW show	Toronto, ON	3	42		
18	Bobo Brazil	February 6, 1977	MLW show	Toronto, ON	1	21		
19	The Sheik	February 27, 1977	MLW show	Toronto, ON	4	N/A		
—	Vacated	July 1977	N/A	—	—	—	Sheik left the Toronto area; Mid-Atlantic version was recognized in Toronto from May 1978 until July 1984 when Toronto territory joined the WWF.	

== See also ==
- National Wrestling Alliance
- WWE United States Championship
- NWA Canadian Heavyweight Championship (Toronto version)
