= Kurt Von Hess =

Canadian professional wrestler (1942–1999)

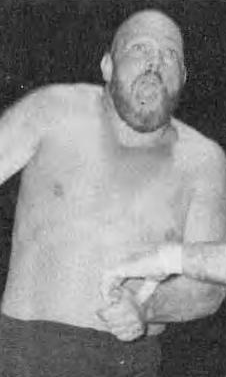
- Von Hess, c. 1985

Personal information
- Born: William Earl Terry; April 10, 1942 Hamilton, Ontario, Canada
- Died: March 13, 1999 (aged 56) Hamilton, Ontario, Canada
- Spouse: Catherine Sophia Terry
- Children: 4

Professional wrestling career
- Ring name(s): Big Bill Terry; Kurt Von Hess; Assassin #2; Ivan Rappaputski
- Billed height: 6 ft 2 in (188 cm)
- Billed weight: 255 lb (116 kg)
- Trained by: Benny Lima
- Debut: 1965
- Retired: 1986

William Terry (April 10, 1942 – March 13, 1999) was a Canadian professional wrestler, known by his ring name Kurt Von Hess, who competed in North American and international promotions during the 1970s and 1980s, including International Wrestling Enterprise, Maple Leaf Wrestling, and Stampede Wrestling. A regular tag team partner of Karl Von Schotz, the two were one of the most hated "heels" in the Detroit-area while competing in the National Wrestling Alliance during the early-1970s.

== Professional wrestling career ==
Making his debut in 1965, Terry began wrestling in Pittsburgh for Studio Wrestling and later the World Wide Wrestling Federation. In September 1968, he made his debut in Toronto for promoter Frank Tunney's Maple Leaf Wrestling as "Big" Bill Terry. After a brief stint in World Class Championship Wrestling in late 1968,

In 1970 Terry shaved his head, sold his Orange Crush distributor business and became Kurt Von Hess. Working for Pedro Martinez’s NWF promotion out of Buffalo, NY and the Ohio towns. In 1970, Terry’s tag team partner was Don “The Executioner” Lewin. Terry and Lewin went on to win the NWF Tag Team Titles defeating Eric The Red and Bruce Swayze. A month later Bobo Brazil and Chief White Owl retained the title.

On December 3, 1971 Terry won the coveted Stampede North American Heavyweight Championship defeating Bob Lueck in 1971. Eventually losing the title to Tor Kamata in February 18, 1972 in Calgary, Alberta. He left the territory to work in Montreal, QC for The Rougeau’s.

John Anson had arrived from Calgary later that year, the two began teaming together as Kurt Von Hess and Karl Von Schotz and soon rose to the top of the tag team division defeating Jacques Rougeau and Gino Brito for the Provincial Tag Team Championship in May 1972. Losing the title briefly in September they regained the title defeating Carlos Colon and Jose Rivera. It was during this time Terry took a chair shot from Jaques Rougeau and his eyeball popped out. Luckily a doctor was in the dressing room and saved his eye.

Often headlining events at Maple Leaf Gardens between October 1972 and September 1973, they would also wrestle in Detroit for promoter Ed Farhat defeating Ben Justice and The Stomper for the NWA World Tag Team Championship on December 9, 1972.

Losing the tag team titles to Fred Curry and Tony Marino later that month, they would feud with Curry and Marino for the tag team titles during throughout early 1973 and won the NWA World Tag Team Championship three more times from them until losing the titles to Tony Marino and Bobo Brazil in early 1974. Winning the NWF World Tag Team Championship in May, the two would remain tag team champions until the promotions close later that year. He and Von Shotz held the title a record 5 times.

While touring New Japan Pro-Wrestling, he and Von Schotz won the NWA North American Tag Team Championship defeating Johnny Powers and Pat Patterson before losing the titles to Antonio Inoki and Seiji Sakaguchi in Los Angeles, California on August 16, 1974.

Splitting up with Anson in 1974, he would remain in Detroit winning the NWA Tag Team Championship once more with Kurt Von Brauner defeating The Islanders (Afa and Sika) in Toledo, Ohio on December 19, 1975.

Losing the tag team titles to Chris Colt and Count Drummer in March 1976, Terry moved to IWA Wrestling that spring to North Carolina. He teamed up with Karl Von Stroheim to capture the IWA Tag team titles defeating Johnny Powers and The Mighty Igor.

Terry moved on to NWA All-Star Wrestling in the fall where he teamed with John Quinn to win the NWA Canadian Tag Team Championship in 1976. He and Quinn also won the International Wrestling Enterprise World Tag Team Championship defeating Animal Hamaguchi and Isamu Teranishi in Yokohama, Japan on March 25, 1977. The following night at Sumo Hall in Tokyo, he and Quinn lost the titles to Animal Hamaguchi and Isamu Teranishi in a two out of three falls match. Terry would score the first fall pinning Animal Hamaguchi, however he and Von Hess forfeited the second fall via disqualification allowing Hamaguchi to pin Von Hess for the third pinfall.

August 1977 Terry headed West back to Stu Hart’s Stampede Wrestling briefly before moving on to All Star Wrestling. Terry and John Quinn tag teamed together defeating Afa and Sika Anoai in Vancouver late that year. They lost the titles to Don Leo Jonathan and Dutch Savage.

Terry ventured in 1977 to southeastern United States feuding with The Wrestling Pro over the NWA Gulf Coast Heavyweight Championship. Which Terry captured twice. Losing the title to Ken Lucas in Mobile, Alabama on July 26, 1977.

In 1978, he and Seigfried Stanke defeated Steven Little Bear & Ray Candy for the NWA Louisiana Tag team Championship before losing the tag team titles to Terry Latham & Ricky Fields.

In late 1978 Terry moved to Georgia Championship Wrestling for 6 months before returning to Gulf Coast Wrestling that summer of 1979. Terry went under a hood as Assassin #2 teaming up with Randy Colley as Assassin #1. They continued an on tv war against Afa and Sika Anoai. The pair left the territory for Jerry Jarrett’s promotion in November. In December they won The Southern Tag Team Titles defeating Hector Guerrero and Steve Regal. They went on to hold the titles four times before splitting up in April 1980.

Terry worked for WWF for a short period in 1983.

Briefly teaming in the Memphis area with King Kong Bundy, Masao Ito, Eddie Gilbert, Phil Hickerson, Randy Collins as well as facing Dutch Mantel and Tojo Yamamoto during the early 1980s, Terry would also continue wrestling in Toronto and, in January 1984, he substituted for Buzz Sawyer in bloody dog-collar match against Roddy Piper.

Briefly teaming in the Memphis area with King Kong Bundy, Masao Ito, Eddie Gilbert, Phil Hickerson as well as facing Randy Savage, Dutch Mantel and Tojo Yamamoto during the mid 1980’s, As well as smaller promotions in the South until retiring in 1986.

== Retirement and death ==
After suffering problems with his kidneys, he was forced to retire in 1989. In 1991 he had complete kidney failure and would remain on a dialysis machine for six years before an organ donor was available. He underwent an operation to receive a new kidney in April 1996.

He was able to reconnect with some of his wrestling colleagues and friends in June 1996 where Terry was honoured as a wrestling legend at The Wrestling Legends I show in honour of Ilio DePaulo. This was the last sporting event at The Buffalo Auditorium. Alumni of wrestling including Lou Thesz, Angelo Mosca, Dory Funk Jr. Johnny Powers, Bruce Swayze, Reggie Love and many other legends. After being so ill he had the enjoyment of being around his brothers one more time. This reunion continued three more years.

Unfortunately Terry died suddenly from a heart attack at his West Hamilton home on March 13, 1999. He was 56 years old.

On July 10, 2017, Terry's wife Catherine died from a heart attack. She was 71 years old.

His daughter Paige honours his legacy and career through social media and attending wrestling events, keeping his memory relevant. She is a lifetime member and Benevolent Director for The Cauliflower Alley Club.

== Championships and accomplishments ==
- Big Time Wrestling
  - NWA World Tag Team Championship (Detroit version) (5 times) - with Karl Von Schotz
- Continental Wrestling Association
  - AWA Southern Tag Team Championship (4 times) - with Assassin #1
- Gulf Coast Championship Wrestling
  - NWA Gulf Coast Heavyweight Championship (2 times)
- International Wrestling Enterprise
  - IWA World Tag Team Championship (1 time) - with Karl Von Stroheim
- Lutte Internationale
  - Provincial Tag Team Championship (2 times) - with Karl Von Schotz
- National Wrestling Alliance
  - NWA North American Tag Team Championship (Los Angeles/Japan version) (1 time) - with Karl Von Schotz (Note: Records aren't clear as to which NWA affiliated promotion they were wrestling in at the time when they held the title.)
- NWA All-Star Wrestling
  - NWA Canadian Tag Team Championship (Vancouver version) (1 time) - with John Quinn
- NWA Tri-State
  - NWA Louisiana Tag Team Championship (1 time) - with Seigfried Stanke
- NWA Hollywood Wrestling
  - NWA Americas Tag Team Championship (1 time) with Otto Von Heller
- National Wrestling Federation
  - NWF World Tag Team Championship (2 times) - with Eric the Red and Karl Von Schotz (1)
- International Wrestling Association
  - IWA World Tag Team Championship (1 time) - with Karl Von Stroheim
- Southwest Sports, Inc. / NWA Big Time Wrestling
  - NWA Brass Knuckles Championship (Texas version) (1 time)
- Stampede Wrestling
  - Stampede North American Heavyweight Championship (1 time)
  - Stampede Wrestling Hall of Fame
