= James Dudley =

Baseball player; professional wrestling executive

- Born: May 12, 1910; Baltimore, Maryland, U.S.
- Died: May 26, 2004 (aged 94); Washington, D.C., U.S.

James Dudley (May 12, 1910 – May 26, 2004) was an American baseball player, professional wrestling manager, and professional wrestling executive. He played Negro league baseball for nine years but is best known for his time with the World Wide Wrestling Federation. He worked with four generations of wrestling's McMahon family and was particularly close with Vincent J. McMahon. At age 74, he was put back on the company's payroll to show appreciation for his work for the McMahons. He also managed several wrestlers in the WWWF and was inducted into the WWF Hall of Fame class of 1994.

== Baseball career ==
Dudley was considered an "excellent athlete" and ran the 100-yard dash in under ten seconds on multiple occasions. Although he showed up for the trials for the 1924 United States Olympic team, he was not allowed to participate because African Americans were not permitted on the team. After playing semi-professional baseball in Baltimore, Maryland, Dudley signed with the Baltimore Elite Giants at age 27. Nicknamed "Big Train", he played catcher but started out helping pitchers warm up in the bullpen. Playing alongside two other talented catchers, Roy Campanella and Eggie Clarke, Dudley's playing time was limited. He remained with the Elite Giants until leaving professional baseball in 1945. In total, he played about 60 games in the Negro leagues.

== Professional wrestling career ==
James Dudley began working for Jess McMahon in the 1950s, when McMahon was a co-owner of the Capitol Wrestling Corporation. When McMahon and his partners broke away from the National Wrestling Alliance to form the World Wide Wrestling Federation (WWWF) in 1963, Dudley continued to work for McMahon. Dudley performed many different jobs, from carrying buckets of water to counting ticket sales. Dudley was a close friend of Vincent J. McMahon and continued working for the family when the younger McMahon took over the business from his father; in particular, he drove McMahon's limousine and served as his bodyguard. He has said that he thought of McMahon as a father figure. McMahon later increased Dudley's responsibilities with the company several times, and eventually assigned him to manage Turner's Arena in Washington, D.C. His role required him to oversee several other events, including the Town and Country Jamboree television show.

"Although he was rarely seen by the fans, James Dudley is one of the most important and influential men in sports-entertainment history. In the 1950s and ‘60s, when fans tuned into WWE's weekly TV show, few realized the enormous role Dudley was playing behind the scenes."
Hall of Fame Inductees -WWE.com

Dudley managed several wrestlers, including Bobo Brazil. Prior to Brazil's matches, Dudley excited the crowds by waving a towel while running to the ring. He also managed such wrestlers as Bearcat Wright, Sailor Art Thomas, and Sweet Daddy Siki. Over time, Dudley's role with the company diminished and he ceased working for them; the company's operations were moved to Connecticut, and Turner's Arena was demolished. Shortly before McMahon's death in 1984, he told his son, Vincent K. McMahon, who had taken over control of the promotion (then known as the WWF), "Whatever else you do, you take care of James Dudley." After Vincent J. McMahon's death, Dudley was put back on the company payroll at age 74 and subsequently received several gifts from Vincent K. McMahon to show appreciation for Dudley's contributions to the company. Dudley has been described as an "important cog" in the company, and McMahon once stated that "had there been no James Dudley, the WWF possibly wouldn't exist as it does today". Dudley continued to feel a sense of loyalty to the McMahons and their promotion. Dudley was inducted into the WWF Hall of Fame class of 1994 by Vincent K. McMahon.

Dudley's final appearance with the company came during the January 3, 2002, episode of SmackDown!. According to the storyline, Stephanie McMahon was banned from the MCI Center. In an attempt to get past security, she pushed Dudley in a wheelchair but was still refused entrance. Following the scene, Dudley left the wheelchair, walked to his seat, and watched the show.

== Personal life ==
Dudley continued to live in Washington, D.C. after retiring from professional wrestling. He had 38 grandchildren, 34 great-grandchildren, and 16 great-great-grandchildren. Dudley died of natural causes on May 26, 2004, at the age of 94.

== Awards and accomplishments ==
- World Wrestling Federation

- WWF Hall of Fame (Class of 1994)
