= John Bonello (referee) =

Canadian professional wrestler and referee

John Joseph Bonello is a Canadian professional wrestler and referee who worked for the World Wrestling Federation during the 1980s.

== Wrestling ==
Bonello started as enhancement talent for Big Time Wrestling. He got a push in 1980 that saw him win the Detroit version of the NWA World Tag Team Championship twice. After the promotion closed, he moved to Maple Leaf Wrestling. In 1984, he faced Billy Red Lyons in Lyons’ final match for the promotion. He also wrestled for Jim Crockett Promotions.

== Officiating ==
After his in-ring career ended, Bonello regularly refereed wrestling shows at Toronto's Maple Leaf Gardens. He refereed at Wrestlemania VI at the SkyDome. He helped train future WWF referee Jimmy Korderas.

== Criminal conviction ==
On April 15, 1990, Bonello was arrested and charged with counselling to commit first-degree murder. According to police, he offered $5,000 to an undercover officer posing as a hit man to murder his wife, Diane. He was convicted of counselling first-degree murder, which carried a maximum penalty of life imprisonment. During sentencing, the prosecution asked for a prison term of at least six years. Diane Bonello testified on her husband's behalf, telling the court that her husband's multiple jobs (he was working full-time at McDonnell Douglas and part time as a referee and bouncer) and drug use (he was using marijuana, cocaine, amphetamines, and steroids) sent her husband "over the edge." Psychiatrist Dr. Basil Orchard testified Bonello's steroid use likely resulted in a steroid psychosis. He was sentenced to 18 months in prison, three years' probation, and 360 hours of community service. The Court of Appeal for Ontario later increased the sentence to five years, on the grounds that the original sentence "clearly failed to reflect the need for a denunciatory sentence to mark the gravity of the offence and the need to deter others similarly inclined."
