= WCWA Brass Knuckles Championship =

Professional wrestling championship

WCCW Brass Knuckles Championship

Details
- Promotion: Big Time Wrestling; World Class Championship Wrestling; World Class Wrestling Association
- Date established: March 6, 1953
- Date retired: 1987

Other names
- NWA Brass Knuckles Championship (Texas version); NWA Texas Brass Knuckles Championship; WCCW Brass Knuckles Championship
Statistics
- First champion: Bull Curry
- Most reigns: Bull Curry (24 reigns)
- Longest reign: Bull Curry (421 days)
- Shortest reign: Dusty Rhodes (24 hours)
- Heaviest champion: Abdullah the Butcher (430 lb (200 kg; 31 st))
- Lightest champion: Mark Lewin (220 lb (100 kg; 16 st))

The WCWA Brass Knuckles Championship (referred to as the Bare Knucks Title as well) was a professional wrestling championship sanctioned by the National Wrestling Alliance and promoted primarily in the Texas territory. Initially the championship saw wrestlers literally using brass knuckles during matches, but was later modified to simply be "No Disqualification" matches. The brass knuckles championship was promoted from 1953 through 1987, and was defended primarily in the Dallas–Fort Worth area as part of Southwest Sports, Inc. It continued to be used after the promotion changed its name to Big Time Wrestling and, finally, World Class Championship Wrestling. In 1987, a year after WCCW left the NWA and became the World Class Wrestling Association, the title was abandoned. As it is a professional wrestling championship, it is won not by actual competition, but by a scripted ending to a match. (Note: Hornbaker (2016) p. 550: "Professional wrestling is a sport in which match finishes are predetermined. Thus, win–loss records are not indicative of a wrestler's genuine success based on their legitimate abilities – but on now much, or how little they were pushed by promoters")

The NWA Texas Brass Knuckles Championship was created in 1953 in the Houston, Texas National Wrestling Alliance (NWA) territory Southwest Sports, promoted by Ed McLemore. The first champion was "Wild" Bull Curry, who defeated Danny McShain in the finals of a tournament. The "Brass Knuckles" title was originally created for Curry, who used a very hard hitting, brawling hardcore style of wrestling, with a "no disqualification" stipulation for all championship matches. Over the years Bull Curry would win the championship a record setting 24 times, with Mark Lewin and Bruiser Brody tied for second most reigns at eight total. Due to a lack of documentation, especially from the 1950s to the 1970s, it is possible that Curry won the championship more than 24 times.

In 1966, Fritz Von Erich bought Southwest Sports from McLemore, and continued to promote the brass knuckle championship in the renamed "Big Time Wrestling" promotion. In 1982 Big Time Wrestling was rebranded as "World Class Championship Wrestling", including all the championships dropping the "NWA" prefix for "WCCW". In 1986 WCCW left the NWA completely and was renamed "World Class Wrestling Association" WCWA and renamed all championships as well. Abdullah the Butcher was the last wrestler to win the championship in Texas, defeating The Great Kabuki on July 4, 1986. The championship was not promoted again until WCWA announced that Tony Atlas had won the championship at a non-WCWA show in Montreal, Canada. No record exists of Montreal show, leading to the possibility that the Atlas title victory was fictitious and used to explain why the championship was no longer used. Over the years the championship has been vacated several times, often with a tournament held to determine the next champion, only details of the 1968 tournament, won by Kurt Von Hess, and the 1969 tournament, won by Baron Von Raschke have been found.

== Title history ==
Key
No.	Overall reign number
Reign	Reign number for the specific champion
Days	Number of days held
N/A	Unknown information
†	Championship change is unrecognized by the promotion

No.	Champion	Championship change			Reign statistics		Notes	Ref.
No.	Champion	Date	Event	Location	Reign	Days	Notes	Ref.
NWA Brass Knuckles Championship (Texas version)
1	Bull Curry	March 6, 1953	House show	Houston, Texas	1	(Note: The date the championship was lost is uncertain, the reign lasted at least 209 days.)	Defeated Danny McShain to become the first champion.	
2	Danny Savich	October 1953	House show	N/A	1	(Note: The date the championship was lost is uncertain, the reign lasted at least 189 days.)		
Championship history is unrecorded from October 1953 to April 8, 1954.
3	Don Evans	April 8, 1954	House show	N/A	1	(Note: The date the championship was lost is uncertain, the reign lasted at least 1 day.)	It is not clear who Don Evans defeated to win the championship	
Championship history is unrecorded from April 8, 1954 to 1954.
4	Rito Romero	1954	House show	N/A	1	(Note: The date the championship was lost is uncertain, the reign lasted at least -19823 days.)	It is not clear who Romero defeated to win the championship	
5	Joe Christie	September 14, 1954	House show	Dallas, Texas	1	7		
6	Johnny Valentine	September 21, 1954	House show	Dallas, Texas	1	24		
7	Joe Christie	October 15, 1954	House show	Houston, Texas	2	151		
8	Bull Curry	March 15, 1955	House show	N/A	2	(Note: The date the championship was lost is uncertain, the reign lasted at least 334 days.)	Still champion as of April 21, 1955.	
Championship history is unrecorded from April 21, 1955 to December 1955.
9	Danny Savich	December 1955	House show	N/A	2	(Note: The date the championship was lost is uncertain, the reign lasted at least 5 days.)	It is not clear who Savich defeated to win the championship	
10	Duke Keomuka	December 6, 1955	House show	Dallas, Texas	1	(Note: The date the championship was lost is uncertain, the reign lasted at least 64 days.)		
Championship history is unrecorded from December 6, 1955 to February 8, 1956.
11	Rocky Columbo	February 8, 1956	House show	N/A	1	2	It is not clear who Columbo defeated to win the championship	
12	Danny McShain	February 10, 1956	House show	Houston, Texas	1	11		
13	Bull Curry	February 21, 1956	House show	Dallas, Texas	3	27		
14	Don Evans	March 19, 1956	House show	Fort Worth, Texas	2	7		
15	Bull Curry	March 26, 1956	House show	Fort Worth, Texas	4	242		
16	El Medíco	November 23, 1956	House show	Houston, Texas	1	(Note: The date the championship was lost is uncertain, the reign lasted at least 147 days.)	Still champion as of December 18, 1956.	
Championship history is unrecorded from November 23, 1956 to April 19, 1957.
17	Don Leo Jonathan	April 19, 1957	House show	Houston, Texas	1	(Note: The date the championship was lost is uncertain, the reign lasted at least 265 days.)	Defeated Pepper Gomez to win the championship. Uncertain if this was a tournament final or if Gomez was champion	
Championship history is unrecorded from April 19, 1957 to January 9, 1958.
18	Stu Gibson	January 9, 1958	House show	Galveston, Texas	1	14	Defeated Casey McShain in tournament final after the first match on January 2, 1958 ends in a double disqualification.	
19	Bull Curry	January 23, 1958	House show	Galveston, Texas	5	(Note: The date the championship was lost is uncertain, the reign lasted at least 37 days.)		
20	Danny McShain	March 1958	House show	N/A	2	(Note: The date the championship was lost is uncertain, the reign lasted at least 45 days.)		
21	Bull Curry	March 8, 1958	House show	Angleton, Texas	6	38		
22	Fritz Von Erich	April 15, 1958	House show	Dallas, Texas	1	(Note: The date the championship was lost is uncertain, the reign lasted at least -104 days.)		
23	Bull Curry	1958	House show	N/A	7	(Note: The date the championship was lost is uncertain, the reign lasted at least 194 days.)		
24	Stu Gibson	July 14, 1958	House show	Fort Worth, Texas	2	(Note: The date the championship was lost is uncertain, the reign lasted at least 18 days.)		
25	Fritz Von Erich	August 1958	House show	N/A	2	(Note: The date the championship was lost is uncertain, the reign lasted at least 45 days.)		
26	Bill Longson	August 5, 1958	House show	Dallas, Texas	1	41	Defeated Fritz Von Erich	
27	Danny McShain	September 15, 1958	House show	N/A	3	(Note: The date the championship was lost is uncertain, the reign lasted at least 1 day.)		
—	Vacated	1958	—	—	—	—	Championship vacated for undocumented reasons	
28	Joe Christie	January 6, 1959	House show	Dallas, Texas	3	91	Defeated Danny McShain, Tosh Togo and Al Costello in a tournament to win the vacant championship.	
29	Bull Curry	April 7, 1959	House show	Dallas, Texas	8	63		
29	Golden Giant	June 9, 1959	House show	Dallas, Texas	1	7		
30	The Zebra Kid	June 16, 1959	House show	Dallas, Texas	1	(Note: The date the championship was lost is uncertain, the reign lasted at least 133 days.)		
Championship history is unrecorded from June 16, 1959 to October 27, 1959.
31	Danny McShain	October 27, 1959	House show	N/A	4	(Note: The date the championship was lost is uncertain, the reign lasted at least 1 day.)	It is not clear who McShain defeated to win the championship	
32	Iron Mike DiBiase	1959	House show	N/A	1	(Note: The date the championship was lost is uncertain, the reign lasted at least 34 days.)		
—	Vacated	December 1959	—	—	—	—	Championship vacated for undocumented reasons	
33	Danny McShain	December 11, 1959	House show	Houston, Texas	5	(Note: The date the championship was lost is uncertain, the reign lasted at least 146 days.)	Defeated Mr. Moto	
Championship history is unrecorded from December 18, 1959 to May 5, 1960.
34	Bull Curry	May 5, 1960	House show	N/A	9	39	It is not clear who Curry defeated to win the championship	
35	Tony Borne	June 13, 1960	House show	Fort Worth, Texas	1	(Note: The date the championship was lost is uncertain, the reign lasted at least 1 day.)		
—	Vacated	1960	—	—	—	—	Championship vacated for undocumented reasons	
36	Danny McShain	November 10, 1960	House show	N/A	6	30	It is not clear who McShain defeated to win the championship	
37	Bull Curry	December 10, 1960	House show	Beaumont, Texas	10	(Note: The date the championship was lost is uncertain, the reign lasted at least 215 days.)	Still champion as of March 30, 1961.	
Championship history is unrecorded from December 10, 1960 to July 13, 1961.
38	Tony Martin	July 13, 1961	House show	N/A	1	(Note: The date the championship was lost is uncertain, the reign lasted at least 1 day.)	It is not clear who Martin defeated to win the championship	
Championship history is unrecorded from July 13, 1961 to 1961.
39	Stu Gibson	1961	House show	N/A	3	(Note: The date the championship was lost is uncertain, the reign lasted at least 18 days.)	It is not clear who Gibson defeated to win the championship	
40	Waldo Von Erich	August 1961	House show	N/A	1	(Note: The date the championship was lost is uncertain, the reign lasted at least 210 days.)		
Championship history is unrecorded from August 1961 to February 27, 1962.
41	Bull Curry	February 27, 1962	House show	N/A	11	13	It is not clear who Curry defeated to win the championship	
42	Jack Dalton	March 12, 1962	House show	Dallas, Texas	1	8		
43	Bull Curry	March 20, 1962	House show	Dallas, Texas	12	(Note: The date the championship was lost is uncertain, the reign lasted at least -323 days.)		
44	Jack Dalton	May 1962	House show	N/A	2	(Note: The date the championship was lost is uncertain, the reign lasted at least 379 days.)		
45	Bull Curry	May 15, 1962	House show	Dallas, Texas	13	209		
46	Tony Borne	December 10, 1962	House show	Fort Worth, Texas	2	42		
47	Bull Curry	January 21, 1963	House show	Fort Worth, Texas	14	18		
48	Rock Hunter	February 8, 1963	House show	Fort Worth, Texas	1	17		
49	Bull Curry	February 25, 1963	House show	Fort Worth, Texas	15	21		
50	Louie Tillet	March 18, 1963	House show	Fort Worth, Texas	1	59		
51	Bull Curry	May 16, 1963	House show	Houston, Texas	16	(Note: The date the championship was lost is uncertain, the reign lasted at least 108 days.)	Defeated Jack Dalton for the championship	
52	Bill Miller	September 1963	House show	N/A	1	(Note: The date the championship was lost is uncertain, the reign lasted at least 75 days.)		
53	Bull Curry	November 15, 1963	House show	Dallas, Texas	17	5	Defeated Louie Tillet.	
54	Stan Stasiak	November 20, 1963	House show	N/A	1	(Note: The date the championship was lost is uncertain, the reign lasted at least 11 days.)	Sometime after November 15, 1963.	
55	Bull Curry	December 1963	House show	N/A	18	(Note: The date the championship was lost is uncertain, the reign lasted at least 243 days.)		
56	Killer Karl Kox	July 31, 1964	House show	Houston, Texas	1	(Note: The date the championship was lost is uncertain, the reign lasted at least 1 day.)		
57	Bull Curry	August 1964	House show	N/A	19	(Note: The date the championship was lost is uncertain, the reign lasted at least 20 days.)		
58	Killer Karl Kox	August 21, 1964	House show	Houston, Texas	2	66		
59	Tony Borne	October 26, 1964	House show	Fort Worth, Texas	3	35		
60	Bull Curry	November 30, 1964	House show	Fort Worth, Texas	20	83	Defeated The Wrecker (Frank Shields).	
61	Killer Karl Kox	February 21, 1965	House show	N/A	3	85		
62	Bull Curry	May 17, 1965	House show	Fort Worth, Texas	21	421		
63	Louie Tillet	July 12, 1966	House show	Dallas, Texas	2	13		
64	Tony Borne	July 25, 1966	House show	Fort Worth, Texas	4	14		
65	Waldo Von Erich	August 8, 1966	House show	Fort Worth, Texas	2	(Note: The date the championship was lost is uncertain, the reign lasted at least 146 days.)		
Championship history is unrecorded from August 8, 1966 to 1967.
66	Bull Curry	1967	House show	N/A	22	(Note: The date the championship was lost is uncertain, the reign lasted at least 212 days.)	It is not clear who Curry defeated to win the championship	
67	Brute Bernard	August 1967	House show	N/A	1	(Note: The date the championship was lost is uncertain, the reign lasted at least 31 days.)		
68	Bull Curry	September 1967	House show	N/A	23	(Note: The date the championship was lost is uncertain, the reign lasted at least 17 days.)		
69	Brute Bernard	September 18, 1967	House show	Fort Worth, Texas	2	(Note: The date the championship was lost is uncertain, the reign lasted at least 13 days.)	Possibly won the title on September 13, 1967 in San Antonio, Texas or title change was repeated in Fort Worth	
70	Louie Tillet	October 1967	House show	Atlanta, Georgia	3	(Note: The date the championship was lost is uncertain, the reign lasted at least 30 days.)		
71	Fritz Von Erich	October 31, 1967	House show	Dallas, Texas	3	14		
72	Spoiler #2	November 14, 1967	House show	N/A	1	(Note: The date the championship was lost is uncertain, the reign lasted at least 139 days.)	Previously known as Smasher Sloan	
73	Chris Markoff	April 1968	House show	Dallas, Texas	1	(Note: The date the championship was lost is uncertain, the reign lasted at least 89 days.)		
74	El Mongol	June 29, 1968	House show	Atlanta, Georgia	1	9		
75	Fritz Von Erich	July 8, 1968	House show	Fort Worth, Texas	4	(Note: The date the championship was lost is uncertain, the reign lasted at least 29 days.)		
—	Vacated	July 1968	—	—	—	—	Title vacated when Von Erich became NWA United States Heavyweight Champion.	
76	Kurt Von Hess	August 6, 1968	House show	N/A	1	(Note: The date the championship was lost is uncertain, the reign lasted at least 1 day.)	Defeated Duke Keomuka in the finals of a 6-man tournament final to win the vacant title.	
Championship history is unrecorded from August 6, 1968 to June 3, 1969.
77	Baron von Raschke	June 3, 1969	House show	Dallas, Texas	1	(Note: The date the championship was lost is uncertain, the reign lasted at least 80 days.)	Defeated Wahoo McDaniel in a tournament final to win the vacant title still champion as of June 17, 1969.	
78	Bull Curry	August 22, 1969	House show	Houston, Texas	23	(Note: The date the championship was lost is uncertain, the reign lasted at least 163 days.)		
—	Vacated	February 1970	—	—	—	—	Championship vacated for undocumented reasons	
79	Johnny Valentine	February 24, 1970	House show	Dallas, Texas	2	(Note: The date the championship was lost is uncertain, the reign lasted at least 66 days.)	Defeated Killer Karl Kox	
80	The Spoiler	May 1970	House show	N/A	1	(Note: The date the championship was lost is uncertain, the reign lasted at least 29 days.)		
81	Killer Kowalski	May 30, 1970	House show	Houston, Texas	1	17		
82	Johnny Valentine	June 16, 1970	House show	N/A	3	14		
83	Killer Kowalski	June 30, 1970	House show	Dallas, Texas	2	227		
84	Johnny Valentine	February 12, 1971	House show	Houston, Texas	4	77		
85	Toru Tanaka	April 30, 1971	House show	Houston, Texas	1	63		
86	Johnny Valentine	July 2, 1971	House show	N/A	5	189		
87	José Lothario	January 7, 1972	House show	N/A	1	(Note: The date the championship was lost is uncertain, the reign lasted at least 189 days.)		
Championship history is unrecorded from January 7, 1972 to July 14, 1972.
88	Stan Stasiak	July 14, 1972	House show	N/A	2	(Note: The date the championship was lost is uncertain, the reign lasted at least 140 days.)	It is not clear who Stasiak defeated to win the championship	
Championship history is unrecorded from July 14, 1972 to December 1972.
89	Blackjack Lanza	December 1972	House show	N/A	1	(Note: The date the championship was lost is uncertain, the reign lasted at least 179 days.)	It is not clear who Lanza defeated to win the championship	
Championship history is unrecorded from December 1972 to May 29, 1973.
90	Blackjack Mulligan	May 29, 1973	House show	Dallas, Texas	1	45	Won a battle royal to win the vacant championship	
91	José Lothario	July 13, 1973	House show	Houston, Texas	2	(Note: The date the championship was lost is uncertain, the reign lasted at least 445 days.)		
92	Blackjack Lanza	October 1974	House show	N/A	2	(Note: The date the championship was lost is uncertain, the reign lasted at least 31 days.)		
93	José Lothario	November 1974	House show	N/A	3	(Note: The date the championship was lost is uncertain, the reign lasted at least 34 days.)	Sometime after November 22, 1974.	
94	Blackjack Lanza	December 5, 1974	House show	Corpus Christi, Texas	3	120		
95	Superstar Billy Graham	April 4, 1975	House show	Houston, Texas	1	28		
96	Mad Dog Vachon	May 2, 1975	House show	N/A	1	95		
97	Superstar Billy Graham	August 5, 1975	House show	Dallas, Texas	2	49		
98	José Lothario	September 23, 1975	House show	Dallas, Texas	4	(Note: The date the championship was lost is uncertain, the reign lasted at least 100 days.)	Still/again champion as of July 2, 1976.	
Championship history is unrecorded from September 23, 1975 to 1976.
99	Davey O'Hannon	1976	House show	N/A	1	(Note: The date the championship was lost is uncertain, the reign lasted at least 553 days.)	It is not clear who O'Hannon defeated to win the championship	
Championship history is unrecorded from 1976 to July 7, 1977.
100	Captain USA	July 7, 1977	House show	N/A	1	(Note: The date the championship was lost is uncertain, the reign lasted at least 1 day.)	It is not clear who Captain USA defeated to win the championship	
Championship history is unrecorded from July 7, 1977 to 1978.
101	Fritz Von Erich	N/A	House show	N/A	5	(Note: The date the championship was lost is uncertain, the reign lasted at least 1 day.)	It is not clear who Von Erich defeated to win the championship	
102	Killer Karl Krupp	February 3, 1978	House show	Houston, Texas	1	(Note: The date the championship was lost is uncertain, the reign lasted at least 1 day.)		
Championship history is unrecorded from February 3, 1978 to 1978.
103	Mark Lewin	1978	House show	N/A	1	(Note: The date the championship was lost is uncertain, the reign lasted at least 1 day.)	It is not clear who Lewin defeated to win the championship	
104	Superstar Billy Graham	1978	House show	N/A	3	(Note: The date the championship was lost is uncertain, the reign lasted at least 85 days.)		
Championship history is unrecorded from 1978 to May 1978.
105	Killer Karl Krupp	May 1978	House show	N/A	2	(Note: The date the championship was lost is uncertain, the reign lasted at least 1 day.)	It is not clear who Krupp defeated to win the championship	
106	Terry Funk	May 6, 1978	House show	Houston, Texas	1	83		
107	Killer Karl Krupp	July 28, 1978	House show	N/A	3	(Note: The date the championship was lost is uncertain, the reign lasted at least 1 day.)		
108	The Lawman	1978	House show	N/A	1	(Note: The date the championship was lost is uncertain, the reign lasted at least 25 days.)		
109	Killer Karl Krupp	August 23, 1978	House show	Abilene, Texas	4	2		
110	Bruiser Brody	August 25, 1978	House show	Houston, Texas	1	14		
111	Rocky Johnson	September 8, 1978	House show	N/A	1	35		
112	Bruiser Brody	October 13, 1978	House show	Houston, Texas	2	(Note: The date the championship was lost is uncertain, the reign lasted at least 49 days.)		
Championship history is unrecorded from October 13, 1978 to December 1978.
113	Bull Ramos	December 1978	House show	N/A	1	(Note: The date the championship was lost is uncertain, the reign lasted at least 14 days.)	It is not clear who Ramos defeated to win the championship	
114	Mark Lewin	December 15, 1978	House show	Houston, Texas	2	23		
115	Dusty Rhodes	January 7, 1979	House show	Houston, Texas	1	21		
116	Mark Lewin	January 28, 1979	House show	Houston, Texas	3	64		
117	Bruiser Brody	April 2, 1979	House show	Ft. Worth, Texas	3	(Note: The date the championship was lost is uncertain, the reign lasted at least 1 day.)		
—	Vacated	1979	—	—	—	—	Championship vacated for undocumented reasons	
118	Mark Lewin	May 18, 1979	House show	Houston, Texas	4	23	Won a battle royal.	
119	Bruiser Brody	June 10, 1979	House show	Dallas, Texas	4	42		
120	Mark Lewin	July 22, 1979	House show	Dallas, Texas	5	7		
121	Bruiser Brody	July 29, 1979	House show	Dallas, Texas	5	(Note: The date the championship was lost is uncertain, the reign lasted at least 1 day.)		
122	Toru Tanaka	1979	House show	N/A	3	(Note: The date the championship was lost is uncertain, the reign lasted at least 2 days.)		
123	Bruiser Brody	1979	House show	N/A	6	(Note: The date the championship was lost is uncertain, the reign lasted at least 122 days.)		
—	Vacated	1979	—	—	—	—	Championship vacated for undocumented reasons	
124	Mark Lewin	December 1979	House show	N/A	6	(Note: The date the championship was lost is uncertain, the reign lasted at least 20 days.)		
125	Dusty Rhodes	December 21, 1979	House show	Houston, Texas	2	25		
126	Mark Lewin	January 15, 1980	House show	N/A	7	2		
127	Dusty Rhodes	January 17, 1980	House show	Houston, Texas	3	1		
128	Superstar Billy Graham	January 18, 1980	House show	Houston, Texas	4			
129	Mark Lewin	1980	House show	N/A	8	(Note: The date the championship was lost is uncertain, the reign lasted at least 73 days.)		
130	Bruiser Brody	March 14, 1980	House show	Houston, Texas	7	31		
131	Toru Tanaka	April 14, 1980	House show	Fort Worth, Texas	4	(Note: The date the championship was lost is uncertain, the reign lasted at least 1 day.)		
—	Vacated	1980	—	—	—	—	Sometime after May 6, 1980. No documented reason given	
132	Stan Stasiak	August 7, 1980	House show	Amarillo, Texas	3	99	Won a 10-man battle royal.	
133	Bruiser Brody	November 14, 1980	House show	Houston, Texas	8	28		
134	Bugsy McGraw	December 12, 1980	House show	Houston, Texas	1	(Note: The date the championship was lost is uncertain, the reign lasted at least 232 days.)		
—	Vacated	August 1981	—	—	—	—	Championship vacated for undocumented reasons	
Championship history is unrecorded from August 1981 to November 1981.
135	Ernie Ladd	November 1981	House show	N/A	1	(Note: The date the championship was lost is uncertain, the reign lasted at least 54 days.)	Defeated José Lothario,, uncertain if this was a tournament final.	
136	José Lothario	December 25, 1981	Christmas Star Wars	Dallas, Texas	5	94		
137	Bugsy McGraw	March 29, 1982	House show	Fort Worth, Texas	2	(Note: The date the championship was lost is uncertain, the reign lasted at least 156 days.)		
Championship history is unrecorded from March 29, 1982 to September 1982.
138	Bugsy McGraw	September 1982	House show	N/A	3	(Note: The date the championship was lost is uncertain, the reign lasted at least 135 days.)	Defeated Superfly to win the championship, uncertain if this was a tournament final.	
WCCW Texas Brass Knuckles Championship
139	The Great Kabuki	January 14, 1983	House show	Dallas, Texas	1	70		
140	Terry Gordy	March 25, 1983	House show	Dallas, Texas	1	(Note: The date the championship was lost is uncertain, the reign lasted at least 129 days.)		
141	Chris Adams	August 1983	House show	N/A	1	(Note: The date the championship was lost is uncertain, the reign lasted at least 427 days.)		
142	Gino Hernandez	October 1984	House show	N/A	1	(Note: The date the championship was lost is uncertain, the reign lasted at least 273 days.)		
—	Vacated	1985	—	—	—	—	Championship vacated for undocumented reasons	
143	The Great Kabuki	July 1985	House show	N/A	2	(Note: The date the championship was lost is uncertain, the reign lasted at least 368 days.)	Won a tournament to win the vacant title.	
WCWA Texas Brass Knuckles Championship
144	Abdullah the Butcher	July 4, 1986	Independence Day Star Wars	Dallas, Texas	1	(Note: The date the championship was lost is uncertain, the reign lasted at least 393 days.)	World Class Championship Wrestling left the NWA in February 1986.	
145	Tony Atlas	August 1987	House show	Montreal, Quebec, Canada	1	(Note: The date the championship was lost is uncertain, the reign lasted at least 1 day.)		
—	Deactivated	1987	—	—	—	—	Championship was never mentioned after Atlas' win.	

== Championship tournaments ==
=== NWA Brass Knuckles Championship Tournament (1968) ===
The NWA Brass Knuckles Championship Tournament was a one-night single elimination tournament held on August 6, 1968, for the vacant NWA Brass Knuckles Championship.

Quarterfinals
Kurt Von Hess
Grizzly Smith
Dusty Rhodes
Duke Keomuka
Spoiler #1	Draw
Sky Hi McKenzie
BYE
BYE

Semifinals
BYE
BYE
BYE
BYE

Final
Kurt Von Hess
Duke Keomuka

=== NWA Brass Knuckles Championship Tournament (1969) ===
The NWA Brass Knuckles Championship Tournament was a one-night single elimination tournament held in Dallas, Texas on June 3, 1969, for the vacant NWA Brass Knuckles Championship.

Quarterfinals
Baron Von Raschke
Gorilla Lopez
Mike Paidousis
Jose Lothario
Waldo Von Erich
Johnny Valentine
Dusty Rhodes
Wahoo McDaniel

Semifinals
Baron Von Raschke
Jose Lothario
Waldo Von Erich
Wahoo McDaniel

Final
Baron Von Raschke
Wahoo McDaniel

== See also ==
- List of National Wrestling Alliance championships
