= Bull Curry =

American professional wrestler (1913–1985)

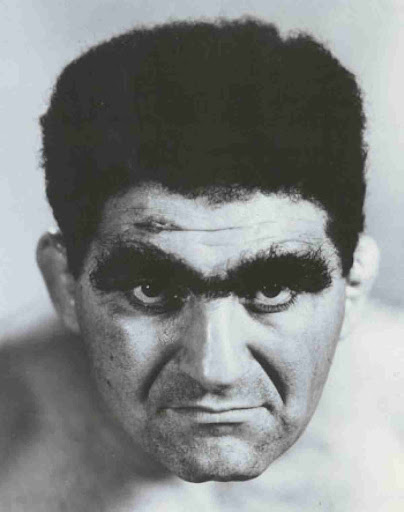
- Curry in 1967

Personal information
- Born: Fred Thomas Koury Sr. May 2, 1913 Hartford, Connecticut, U.S.
- Died: March 8, 1985 (aged 71) Columbus, Ohio, U.S.

Professional wrestling career
- Ring name: "Wild" Bull Curry
- Billed height: 6 ft 1 in (1.85 m)
- Billed weight: 220 lb (100 kg)
- Billed from: Hartford, Connecticut
- Trained by: Adam Weissmuller
- Debut: 1932
- Retired: 1979

Fred Thomas Koury Sr. (May 2, 1913 – March 8, 1985), best known under his ring name "Wild Bull" Curry, was an American professional wrestler of Lebanese descent. He is recognized as the originator of the hardcore style, predating legends such as The Sheik, Abdullah the Butcher, and Bruiser Brody.

== Professional wrestling career ==
=== Early years (1913–1930s) ===
Born on May 2, 1913, he lived in the east end of Hartford, Connecticut. He was of Lebanese descent, and grew up with five siblings. At the age of sixteen, Curry left high school and joined the circus in order to help provide for his four brothers and sisters. His job at the circus was that of the “tough man” who took on all comers from the audience in a fight. He had 65 straight wins without anyone going past one 5-minute round. In 1939, Curry joined the Hartford Police Department, where he put his “tough man” background to good use in the streets, quickly earning him a reputation for toughness. In a probably apocryphal story presumably devised by wrestling promoters to explain his nickname, Curry wrestled to the ground a wild steer bull that had broken out of the Hartford stockyard and run wild in the streets.

=== American independent scene (1940s–1970s) ===
In the 1940s, Curry began wrestling in Detroit under the promoter Adam Weissmuller. While there, Curry developed his brutal, hardcore style of wrestling that made him a top name in the territory. In July 1940, Curry faced the retired professional boxer Jack Dempsey in an exhibition match. Years later, Curry would often claim that he had knocked Dempsey out in the match, but he was actually stopped in the second round.

In the early part of the 1950s, Bull Curry relocated to Texas, where his combination of unpredictable violence, unique look and intensity made him a star more or less immediately upon arrival. Curry's brawling style made him a success but it also kept the promoters from giving him the “main” title of the territory despite being the biggest draw in the territory. Instead of letting Curry win the top title of the Texas territory, the bookers created a brand new title to match his hardcore style of wrestling: the NWA Texas Brass Knuckles Championship, which he won on March 6, 1953, in a tournament final over Danny McShain. From that year onwards until 1967, Curry personified the Texas Brass Knuckles Championship as he held it 20 times, defeating such names including Fritz Von Erich, Tony Borne, Waldo Von Erich, Louie Tillet, Killer Karl Kox and Brute Bernard for the title. Also in 1953, Curry would briefly hold the Texas version of the NWA World Tag Team Championship with Lucas Pertano, as well as the NWA Texas Heavyweight Championship for three weeks.

Bull Curry's son Fred Thomas Koury, Jr. would later start wrestling as "Flying" Fred Curry. Unlike his father, Fred was a clean cut, high flying face, but the two Currys teamed up on a regular basis. The two won the NWA International Tag Team Championship in 1964 and held it until 1966, as well as beating Nikolai and Boris Volkoff for the Ohio version of the NWA World Tag Team Championship. Fred's eventual attempts to get out of his father's shadow never caused any problems between the two Currys. Bull retired from wrestling in 1979 and worked as a corrections officer.

His grandson, Fred Curry Jr. also is a wrestler.

== Professional wrestling persona ==
Bull Curry's trademark was his “wildman” look with bushy eyebrows, maniacal facial expressions and insane eyes that could scare the crowd just by looking at them. In one case, he scared a girl at ringside so badly she had to be carried from the ring in terror. This wild look, coupled with his wild brawling style, made Curry one of the most disliked heels in wrestling. Other wrestlers also refused to work with Curry as they felt he seldom showed the effects of their offense. He was so hated in places that riots broke out more than once as irate fans attacked Curry in the ring.

- 1955: A match between Curry and Ray McIntyre resulted in more than a 140 fans being taken to the hospital after a riot broke out.
- 1956: Curry was jumped by a fan who was displeased with Curry's brutal treatment of local star George Becker. Curry broke the fan's jaw with a single punch.
- 1958: During a match with Pepper Gomez in Galveston, Texas, a fan struck Bull Curry with an iron pipe. Curry chased the fan out of the ring, catching up with him in the balcony where he beat him up.
- 1968: While wrestling Emile Dupreé in Worcester, Massachusetts, a fan jumped in the ring and jumped on Curry's back. Curry punched the fan so hard that he was reportedly unconscious for two days.
- Year unknown: During a match in Texas, Curry got a bucket of yellow paint dumped over his head by a fan.

== Death ==
Koury died from liver disease at a hospital on March 8, 1985, at the age of 71.

== Championships and accomplishments ==
- Big Time Wrestling
  - BTW United States Heavyweight Championship (1 time)
- Cauliflower Alley Club
  - Posthumous Award (2004)
- Maple Leaf Wrestling
  - NWA International Tag Team Championship (Toronto version) (1 time) – with Tiger Jeet Singh
- Mid-South Sports
  - NWA Southern Heavyweight Championship (Georgia version) (1 time)
- New England Pro Wrestling Hall of Fame
  - Class of 2013
- Southwest Sports, Inc. / NWA Big Time Wrestling
  - NWA Brass Knuckles Championship (Texas version) (24 times)
  - NWA International Tag Team Championship (1 time) – with Fred Curry
  - NWA Texas Heavyweight Championship (1 time)
  - NWA World Tag Team Championship (Texas version) (1 time) – with Lucas Pertano
