= NWA World Tag Team Championship (Detroit version) =

Professional wrestling tag team championship

- The Detroit version of the championship

Details
- Promotion: Big Time Wrestling/NWA Detroit
- Date established: 1965
- Date retired: October 1980
Statistics
- First champions: Chris and John Tolos
- Most reigns: Team: Kurt Von Hess and Karl Von Shotz (5 reigns); Individual: Fred Curry (9 reigns)
- Longest reign: The Fabulous Kangaroos (Al Costello and Don Kent (At least 196 days)
- Shortest reign: Lou Klein and Ed George (0 days)

The Detroit version of the NWA World Tag Team Championship was the top ranked professional wrestling championship for tag teams in the Detroit, Michigan-based promotion Big Time Wrestling, sometimes referred to as NWA Detroit, between 1965 and 1980. As a member of the National Wrestling Alliance (NWA), All-Star Wrestling was entitled to promote their own local version of the championship as the NWA bylaws did not restrict its use in the way they restricted the NWA World Heavyweight Championship to one nationally recognized championship. Because individual NWA members, referred to as NWA territories, were allowed to create their own version of the NWA World Tag Team Championship, at least 22 different versions existed between 1949 and 1991. As it is a professional wrestling championship, it is not won or lost competitively, but instead is determined by the decision of the bookers of a wrestling promotion. The title is awarded after the chosen team "wins" a match to maintain the illusion that professional wrestling is a competitive sport.

The first championship team recognized in Detroit was that of the Tolos brothers (Chris and John Tolos), who were introduced as champions around February 1965 as having "recently won" the championship, though no records of a tournament exists. Kurt Von Hess and Karl Von Shotz held the championship five times as a team, the record for the 25-year history of this version of the NWA World Tag Team Championship, while Fred Curry holds the record for most overall reigns (9) with different partners. The shortest reign belongs to Lou Klein and Ed George, as Klein announced his retirement right after the match, making their reign only minutes long. The longest reign lasted at least 196 days as The Fabulous Kangaroos (Al Costello and Don Kent) won the championship on December 18, 1971, and held it until May 1972.

== Title history ==
Key

No.	The overall championship reign
Reign	The reign number for the specific wrestler listed.
Event	The event promoted by the respective promotion in which the title changed hands
N/A	The specific information is not known
—	Used for vacated reigns in order to not count it as an official reign
	Indicates that there was a period where the lineage is undocumented due to the lack of written documentation in that time period.

No.	Champions	Reign	Date	Days held	Location	Event	Notes	Ref(s)
1	Chris and John Tolos	1	February 16, 1965 (NLT)	(Note: The length of this championship reign is too uncertain to calculate.)	(Note: The location of the match was not captured as part of the documentation.)	Live event	Records are unclear on how the Tolos brothers won the championship, listed as "having recently won" in a Detroit newspaper on this day	
2	Johnny Barend and Magnificent Maurice	1	March 5, 1965			Live event		
3	Bobo Brazil and Sailor Art Thomas	1	1960s			Live event		
4	Nikolai (Note: This was not the same wrestler later known as Nikolai Volkoff, that wrestler did not use the ring name until the 1970s.) and Boris Volkoff	1	1960s			Live event		
5	Fred Curry and Billy Red Lyons	1	April 28, 196 (NLT)			Live event		
#	The Internationals (Al Costello and Karl Von Brauner)	#	May 12, 1967 (NLT)	#		Live event	This championship change was only recognized in Ohio, not Detroit. Possible that this was supposed to start a separate Ohio lineage.	
#	Bill Miller and Dan Miller	#	July 13, 1967	#	Columbus, Ohio	Live event		
#	The Fabulous Kangaroos (Al Costello and Ray St. Cair)	#	July 28, 1967 (NLT)	#		Live event	The Ohio branch was not mentioned after August, 1967, Cury and Lyons were recognized as champions in Detroit for this period of time	
6	The Fabulous Kangaroos (Al Costello and Ray St. Clair)	1	1960s			Live event		
7	Fred Curry (2) and Dan Miller	1	1968			Live event		
8	Hell's Angel (Ron and Paul Dupree)	1	1968			Live event		
9	Rocky Johnson and Ben Justice	1	January 18, 1969	(Note: The date that Johnson and Justice lost the championship is unknown, which means that their reign lasted between 1 day and 223 days.)	Detroit, Michigan	Live event		
10	Hell's Angel (Ron and Paul Dupree)	2	1969	(Note: The date that Hell's Angels won the championship is unknown, which means that their reign lasted between 1 day and 223 days.)		Live event		
11	Lou Klein and Roy Klein	1	August 30, 1969	(Note: The date that Lou and Roy Klein lost the championship is unknown, which means that their reign lasted between 1 day and 122 days.)	Detroit, Michigan	Live event		
12	Skull Brothers	1	1969	(Note: The date that the Skull Brothers won the championship is unknown, which means that their reign lasted between 1 day and 518 days.)		Live event		
13	Ben Justice (2) and Guy Mitchell	1	January 31, 1970	49	Detroit, Michigan	Live event		
14	Texas Outlaws (Dusty Rhodes and Dick Murdoch)	1	March 21, 1970	140	Detroit, Michigan	Live event		
15	Bobo Brazil (2) and Lord Athol Layton	1	August 8, 1970	133	Detroit, Michigan	Live event		
—	Vacated	—	December 19, 1970	N/A	N/A	N/A	Championship vacated after Layton was injured by The Sheik.	
16	The Fabulous Kangaroos (Al Costello (2) and Don Kent)	1	December 18, 1971	(Note: The date that the Fabulous Kangaroos lost the championship is unknown, which means that their reign lasted between 196 and 226 days.)	Detroit, Michigan	Live event	Defeated Ben Justice and The Mitchell in a tournament final.	
17	Ben Justice (3) and Guy Mitchell	2	May 1972	(Note: The date that Justice and Mitchel won the championship is unknown, which means that their reign lasted between 1 day and 20 days.)		Live event		
18	The Fabulous Kangaroos (Al Costello and Ray St. Clair)	2	May 20, 1972	56	Detroit, Michigan	Live event		
19	Ben Justice (3) and Guy Mitchell	3	July 15, 1972	147	Detroit, Michigan	Live event		
20	Kurt Von Hess and Karl Von Shotz	1	December 9, 1972	(Note: The date that Von Hess and Von SHotz list the championship is unknown, which means that their reign lasted between 1 day and 22 days.)	Detroit, Michigan	Live event		
21	Fred Curry (3) and Tony Marino	1	December 1972	(Note: The date that Curry and Marino won the championship is unknown, which means that their reign lasted between 5 and 35 days.)		Live event		
22	Kurt Von Hess and Karl Von Shotz	2	January 23, 1973	10	Detroit, Michigan	Live event		
23	Fred Curry (4) and Tony Marino	2	February 2, 1973	16	Detroit, Michigan	Live event		
24	Kurt Von Hess and Karl Von Shotz	3	February 18, 1973	(Note: The date that Von Hess and Von Shotz lost the championship is unknown, which means that their reign lasted between 73 and 71 days.)	Detroit, Michigan	Live event		
25	Fred Curry (5) and Luis Martinez	1	April 1973	(Note: The date that Curry and Martinez won and lost the championship is unknown, which means that their reign lasted between 1 day and 110 days.)	Detroit, Michigan	Live event		
26	Ben Justice (4) and Killer Tim Brooks	1	1973	(Note: The date that Justice and Brooks won the championship is unknown, which means that their reign lasted between 1 day and 110 days.)		Live event		
27	Bobo Brazil (3) and Guy Mitchell	1	July 21, 1973	(Note: The date that Brazil and Mitchell lost the championship is unknown, which means that their reign lasted between 1 day and 118 days.)	Detroit, Michigan	Live event		
28	Ben Justice (4) and Killer Tim Brooks	2	September 9, 1973 (NLT)	(Note: The date that Justice and Brooks won the championship is unknown, which means that their reign lasted between 1 day and 118 days.)		Live event		
29	Guy Mitchell (4) and Tex McKenzie	1	September 12, 1973 (NLT)	(Note: The date that Mitchell and McKenzie won and lost the championship is unknown, which means that their reign lasted between 3 and 65 days.)		Live event		
30	Ben Justice and Killer Tim Brooks	3	November 13, 1973 (NLT)	(Note: The date that Justice and Brooks won the championship is unknown, which means that their reign lasted between 4 and 65 days.)		Live event	Change took place between October 22 and November 13, 1973	
31	Fred Curry (6) and Tony Marino	3	November 17, 1973		Detroit, Michigan	Live event		
32	Kurt Von Hess and Karl Von Shotz	4	January 5, 1974	28	Detroit, Michigan	Live event		
33	Fred Curry (7) and Tony Marino	4	February 2, 1974	14	Detroit, Michigan	Live event		
34	Kurt Von Hess and Karl Von Shotz	5	February 16, 1974	84	Detroit, Michigan	Live event		
35	Bobo Brazil (4) and Tony Marino (5)	1	May 11, 1974	(Note: The date that the championship was vacated is unknown, which means that their reign lasted between 21 and 34 days.)	Detroit, Michigan	Live event		
—	Held up	—	June 1974	N/A	N/A	N/A	Championship held up after match against Ben Justice and Killer Tim Brooks.	
36	Bobo Brazil (5) and Tony Marino (6)	2	June 15, 1974			Live event	Won the rematch against Justice and Brooks	
37	Abdullah the Butcher and Killer Tim Brooks (3)	1	1974			Live event		
38	Bobo Brazil (6) and Tony Marino (7)	3	1974			Live event		
39	The Mongols (Geeto Mongol and Bolo Mongol)	1	1974			Live event		
40	Fred Curry (8) and Bobo Brazil (7)	1	November 1974 (NLT)	(Note: The date that Curry and Brazil won and lost the championship is unknown, which means that their reign lasted between 32 and 91 days.)		Live event	Awarded when The Mongols no-show title defense.	
41	Angelo and Lanny Poffo	1	January 1975			Live event		
42	Hank James and Mighty Igor	1	1975			Live event		
43	Islanders (Afa and Sika)	1	July 19, 1975 (NLT)			Live event		
44	Fred Curry (8) and Hank James (2)	1	October 25, 1975 (NLT)	(Note: The date that Curry and James won and lost the championship is unknown, which means that their reign lasted between 1 day and 110 days.)		Live event		
45	Islanders (Afa and Sika)	2	November 7, 1975 (NLT)	(Note: The date that the Islanders won the championship is unknown, which means that their reign lasted between 407 and 419 days.)		Live event		
46	The Von Brauners (Kurt Von Brauner and Kurt Von Brauner)	1	December 18, 1975	(Note: The date that Von Hess and Von Brauner won the championship is unknown, which means that their reign lasted between 74 and 104 days.)	Toledo, Ohio	Live event		
47	Chris Colt and Count Drummer	1	February 7, 1976 (NLT)	(Note: The date that Colt and Drummer won the championship is unknown, which means that their reign lasted between 21 and 103 days.)		Live event		
48	Chris Colt and Lanny Poffo (2)	1	March 1976	(Note: The date that Colt and Poffo won the championship is unknown, which means that their reign lasted between 31 and 61 days.)		Live event	Drummer gave his half of the championship to Poffo after being injured.	
49	Dominic DeNucci and Chris Markoff	1	May 1, 1976		Detroit, Michigan	Live event		
50	The Fabulous Kangaroos (Al Costello (3) and Tony Charles)	1	1976			Live event		
51	Luke Graham and Ripper Collins	1	April 24, 1977 (NLT)			Live event		
52	Hank James (3) and Ed George	1	1977			Live event		
53	Bounty Hunters	1	1977			Live event		
54	Lou Klein and Ed George (2)	1	July 9, 1977	0		Live event		
—	Vacated	—	July 9, 1977	N/A	N/A	N/A	Klein retired after the match.	
55	Moose Cholak and Ed George (3)	1	April 1978			Live event	Records are unclear as to whom they defeated for the championship	
56	John Bonello and Randy Scott	1	April 1980	(Note: The date that Bonello and Scott won the championship is unknown, which means that their reign lasted between 3 and 33 days.)		Live event	Defeated Pat and Mike Kelly to win the championship	
57	Frankie Laine and George Steele	1	May 3, 1980	21	Detroit, Michigan	Live event		
58	John Bonello and Randy Scott	2	May 24, 1980	35	Detroit, Michigan	Live event		
59	Giant Baba and Jumbo Tsuruta	1	June 28, 1980	(Note: The date that the championship was abandoned is unknown, which means that their reign lasted between 95 and 125 days.)	Detroit, Michigan	Live event		
—	Championship retired	—	October 1980	N/A	N/A	N/A	Promotion closed	

== Team reigns by combined length ==
Key

Symbol	Meaning
¤	The exact length of at least one title reign is uncertain, so the shortest possible length is used.

Rank	Team	# of reigns	Combined days
1	The Islanders (Afa and Sika)	2	407¤
2	Ben Justice and Guy Mitchell	3	197¤
3	Kurt Von Hess and Karl Von Shotz	5	196¤
3	The Fabulous Kangaroos (Al Costello and Don Kent)	1	196¤
5	Texas Outlaws (Dusty Rhodes and Dick Murdoch)	1	140
6	Giant Baba and Jumbo Tsuruta	1	95¤
7	Karl Von Brauner and Kurt Von Brauner	1	74¤
8	The Fabulous Kangaroos (Al Costello and Ray St. Clair)	2	56¤
9	Fred Curry and Tony Marino	4	49¤
10	John Bonello and Randy Scott	2	38¤
11	Bobo Brazil and Lord Athol Layton	1	33
12	Fred Curry and Bobo Brazil	1	32¤
13	Chris Colt and Lanny Poffo	1	31¤
14	Bobo Brazil and Tony Marino	3	21¤
14	Chris Colt and Count Drummer	1	21¤
14	Frankie Laine and George Steele	1	21
17	Ben Justice and Killer Tim Brooks	3	3¤
17	Guy Mitchell and Tex McKenzie	1	3¤
19	Hell's Angel (Ron Dupree and Paul Dupree)	2	2¤
20	Bobo Brazil and Guy Mitchell	1	1¤
20	Fred Curry and Billy Red Lyons	1	1
20	Fred Curry and Hank James	1	1¤
20	Fred Curry and Luis Martinez	1	1¤
20	Lou and Roy Klein	1	1¤
20	Rocky Johnson and Ben Justice	1	1¤
20	Skull Brothers	1	1¤
27	Abdullah the Butcher and Killer Tim Brooks	1	¤
27	Angelo Poffo and Lanny Poffo	1	¤
27	Bobo Brazil and Sailor Art Thomas	1	¤
27	Bounty Hunters	1	¤
27	Chris and John Tolos	1	¤
27	Dominic DeNucci and Chris Markoff	1	¤
27	Fred Curry and Dan Miller	1	¤
27	Hank James and Ed George	1	¤
27	Hank James and Mighty Igor	1	¤
27	Johnny Barend and Magnificent Maurice	1	¤
27	Lou Klein and Ed George	1	0
27	Luke Graham and Ripper Collins	1	¤
27	Moose Cholak and Ed George	1	¤
27	Nikolai and Boris Volkoff	1	¤
27	The Fabulous Kangaroos (Al Costello and Tony Charles)	1	¤
27	The Mongols (Geeto Mongol and Bolo Mongol)	1	¤

== Individual reigns by combined length ==
Key

Symbol	Meaning
¤	The exact length of at least one title reign is uncertain, so the shortest possible length is used.

Rank	Wrestler	# of reigns	Combined days
1	Afa	2	407¤
1	Sika	2	407¤
3	Al Costello	4	252¤
4	Ben Justice	7	201¤
4	Guy Mitchell	5	201¤
7	Kurt Von Hess	5	196¤
7	Karl Von Shotz	5	196¤
7	Don Kent	1	196¤
10	Dick Murdoch	1	140
10	Dusty Rhodes	1	140
12	Giant Baba	1	95¤
12	Jumbo Tsuruta	1	95¤
14	Bobo Brazil	7	87¤
15	Karl Von Brauner	1	74¤
15	Kurt Von Brauner	1	74¤
16	Tony Marino	7	70¤
17	Ray St. Clair	2	56¤
18	Chris Colt	2	52¤
19	John Bonello	2	38¤
19	Randy Scott	2	38¤
21	Lord Athol Layton	1	33
22	Lanny Poffo	2	31¤
23	Count Drummer	1	21¤
23	Frankie Laine	1	21
23	George Steele	1	21
26	Fred Curry	9	8¤
27	Tex McKenzie	1	3¤
27	Killer Tim Brooks	4	3¤
29	Paul Dupree)	2	2¤
29	Ron Dupree	2	2¤
31	Hank James	3	1¤
31	Lou Klein	2	1¤
31	Roy Klein	1	1¤
31	Luis Martinez	1	1¤
31	Billy Red Lyons	1	1
31	Rocky Johnson	1	1¤
31	Skull Brother #1	1	1¤
31	Skull Brother #2	1	1¤
38	Abdullah the Butcher	1	0¤
38	Mighty Igor	1	0¤
38	Johnny Barend	1	0¤
38	Ripper Collins	1	0¤
38	Ed George	3	0¤
38	Chris Markoff	1	0¤
38	Dan Miller	1	0¤
38	Boris Volkoff	1	0¤
38	Nikolai Volkoff	1	0¤
38	Angelo Poffo	1	0¤
38	Bolo Mongol	1	0¤
38	Chris Tolos	1	0¤
38	Dominic DeNucci	1	0¤
38	Geeto Mongol	1	0¤
38	John Tolos	1	0¤
38	Luke Graham	1	0¤
38	Moose Cholak	1	0¤
38	Sailor Art Thomas	1	0¤
38	Tony Charles	1	0¤
38	Bounty Hunter #1	1	0¤
38	Bounty Hunter #2	1	0¤
38	Magnificent Maurice	1	0¤
