= NWA Brass Knuckles Championship =

The NWA Brass Knuckles Championship was a professional wrestling championship sanctioned by the National Wrestling Alliance, contested for in hardcore matches. As it was a professional wrestling championship, it was won not by actual competition, but by a scripted ending to a match. (Note: Hornbaker (2016) p. 550: "Professional wrestling is a sport in which match finishes are predetermined. Thus, win–loss records are not indicative of a wrestler's genuine success based on their legitimate abilities – but on now much, or how little they were pushed by promoters")

Various NWA territories have promoted a Brass Knuckles championship over the years:

- NWA Texas Brass Knuckle Championship – Promoted by NWA Big Time Wrestling from 1953 to 1982
- WCCW Texas Brass Knuckle Championship – Promoted by World Class Championship Wrestling from 1982 to 1985
- WCWA Brass Knuckles Championship – Promoted by World Class Wrestling Association from 1986 to 1987
- NWA Brass Knuckles Championship – promoted by NWA Southwest from 1998 to 1999
- NWA Texas Hardcore Championship – promoted by NWA Southwest from 1999 to 2001
- NWA Brass Knuckles Championship (Amarillo version), promoted by Western States Sports from 1964 to 1981
- NWA Brass Knuckles Championship (Australia version) or World Brass Knuckles Championship, from 1974 to 1978
- NWA Brass Knuckles Championship (Florida version), promoted by Championship Wrestling from Florida from 1960 to c.1984
- NWA Brass Knuckles Championship (Mid-Atlantic version), promoted by Mid-Atlantic Championship Wrestling from 1978 to 1986
- NWA Brass Knuckles Championship (New England version), promoted by NWA New England from 2000 to 2004
- NWA Brass Knuckles Championship (Tri-State version), promoted by NWA Tri-State from 1970 to 1982

== See also ==
- List of National Wrestling Alliance championships
