= Ron Dupree (wrestler) =

American wrestler

Personal information
- Born: Russ Groves; 1935 United States
- Died: October 17, 1975 (aged 39–40) Tacoma, Washington, United States

Professional wrestling career
- Ring name(s): Ron Dupree; Golden Boy Dupree; Hell's Angel #1; Chester Colt; Gorgeous Gi-Gi; Russell Grobes
- Billed height: 5 ft 9 in (175 cm)
- Billed weight: 216 lb (98 kg)
- Debut: 1960

Russ Groves (1935 – October 17, 1975) was an American professional wrestler who worked as Ron Dupree for a variety of different wrestling promotions in the United States such as Big Time Wrestling (Detroit), and Pacific Northwest Wrestling.

== Professional wrestling career ==
Dupree made his professional wrestling debut in 1960 in Boston. In 1966, he formed a tag team with Chris Colt as the Hell's Angels, a biker-themed tag team, in Phoenix, Arizona. Sometimes they were known as the California Hell's Angels or Comancheros. In 1968, the duo burned the American flag (kayfabe) in Phoenix on TV which the promotion shut down due to the incident. They would win many tag team titles in Phoenix, and Detroit until breaking up in 1971.

In 1971, Dupree went on his own and returned to Detroit. He also worked in Toronto and Texas.

In 1974, Colt reunited with Ron Dupree as the Hells Angels in the Gulf Coast, winning the NWA Gulf Coast Tag Team Championship twice.

== Death ==
On October 17, 1975, Dupree died from a heart attack at 40 while ring announcing.

== Personal life ==
Dupree and his tag team partner Chris Colt were a romantic couple outside of wrestling.

== Championships and accomplishments ==
- Arizona Athletic Association Inc.
  - World Tag Team Championship (4 times) - with Paul Dupree (4)
- NWA Detroit
  - NWA World Tag Team Championship (Detroit version) (3 times) – with Paul Dupree (3)
- NWA Gulf Coast
  - NWA Gulf Coast Tag Team Championship - with Paul Dupree (2 times)
