= AWA British Empire Heavyweight Championship =

Professional wrestling championship

Details
- Promotion: American Wrestling Association
- Date established: 1968
- Date retired: 1979
Statistics
- First champion: Billy Red Lyons
- Most reigns: Billy Robinson (3 reigns)
- Longest reign: Dr. X (1,665 days)
- Shortest reign: Super Destroyer Mark II (18 days)

The AWA British Empire Heavyweight Championship was a mid-card professional wrestling title contested for in the American Wrestling Association promotion between 1968 and 1979. The title was primarily defended in Canada, hence the British Empire name.

== Title history ==
Key
No.	Overall reign number
Reign	Reign number for the specific champion
Days	Number of days held

No.	Champion	Championship change			Reign statistics		Notes	Ref.
No.	Champion	Date	Event	Location	Reign	Days	Notes	Ref.
1	Billy Red Lyons	December 10, 1968	House show	N/A	1	514		
2	Dr. X	May 8, 1970	House show	Winnipeg, Manitoba	1	48		
3	Billy Red Lyons	June 25, 1970	House show	Winnipeg, Manitoba	2	63		
4	Blackjack Lanza	August 27, 1970	House show	Winnipeg, Manitoba	1	43		
5	Dr. X	October 9, 1970	House show	Winnipeg, Manitoba	2	1665		
6	Billy Robinson	May 1, 1975	House show	England	1	1050	Robinson was named champion.	
7	Angelo Mosca	March 16, 1978	House show	Winnipeg, Manitoba	1	63		
8	Billy Robinson	May 18, 1978	House show	Winnipeg, Manitoba	2	525		
9	Super Destroyer Mark II	October 25, 1979	House show	Winnipeg, Manitoba	1	18		
10	Billy Robinson	November 12, 1979	House show	Winnipeg, Manitoba	3	(Note: The exact date the championship was abandoned is unknown making the length of the reign too uncertain to calculate. Robinson was mentioned as the champion as late as February 1985.)	The title was later abandoned.	
