= Fred Curry =

American professional wrestler (1943–2026)

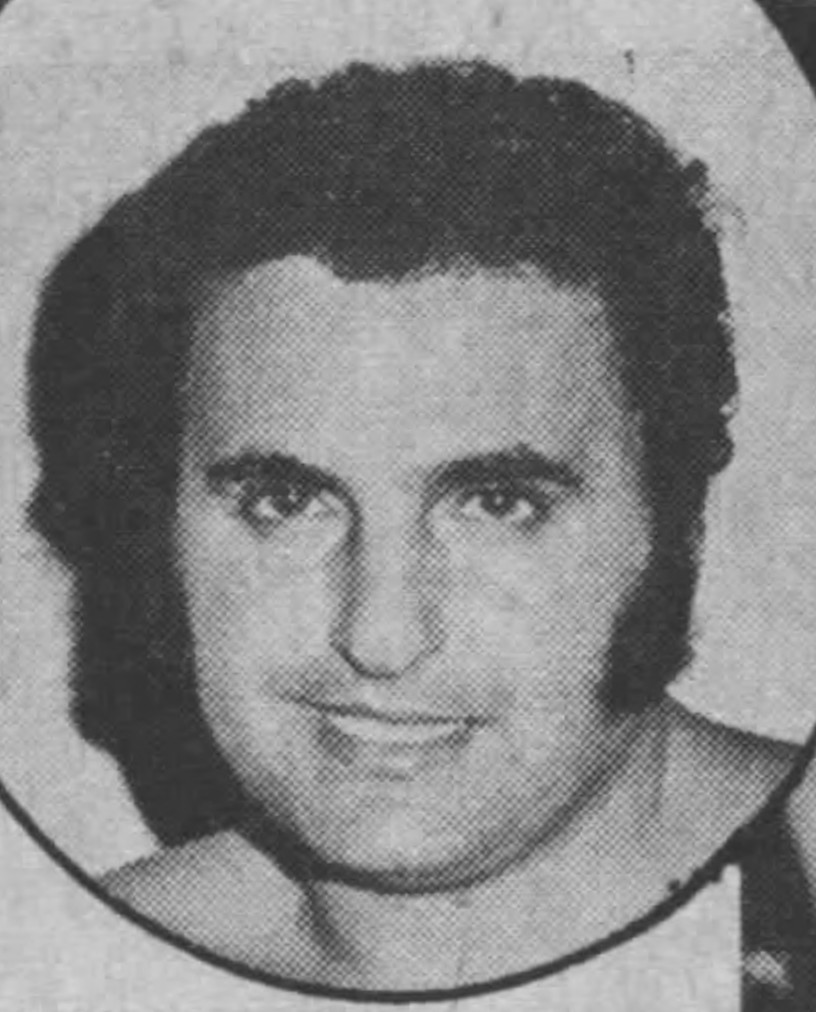
- Curry, circa 1973

Personal information
- Born: Fred Thomas Koury Jr. June 12, 1943
- Died: April 3, 2026 (aged 82)
- Family: Bull Curry (father); Fred Curry Jr. (son)

Professional wrestling career
- Ring name: Fred Curry
- Billed height: 5 ft 11 in (1.80 m)
- Billed weight: 200 lb (91 kg)
- Billed from: Hartford, Connecticut
- Trained by: Bull Curry
- Debut: 1963
- Retired: 1980

Fred Thomas Koury Jr. (June 12, 1943 – April 3, 2026) better known by his ring name "Flying" Fred Curry, was an American professional wrestler of Lebanese descent.

The son of "Wild Bull" Curry, Koury was one of the most popular stars in the Midwest United States and the rest of the world during the 1960s and 1970s. Flying Fred Curry had notable feuds with wrestling legend The Sheik. Flying Fred was a sensational star in Texas in the 1960s and teamed up with Fritz von Erich.

Flying Fred Curry is noted as one of the greatest highflyers and dropkickers of all time. His most famous feat was throwing 15 to 20 dropkicks in a matter of 10 seconds. He was chosen the most popular wrestler in the world in 1972.

== Career ==
In the 1960s, Koury, Jr. took up wrestling under the name "Flying" Fred Curry. Unlike his father, Fred was a slimball high flying wrestler, and a fan favorite. The two Currys teamed up on a regular basis during the early part of the younger Curry's career. The two won the NWA International Tag Team Championship in 1964 and held it until 1966, as well as beating Nikolai and Boris Volkoff for the Detroit version of the NWA World Tag Team Championship.

Later in his career Fred Curry struck out on his own trying to get away from his father's legacy of rulebreaking. Fred's attempts to get out of his father's shadow never caused any problems between the two Currys.

In December 1972, he defeated Kurt Von Hess and Karl Von Shotz along with Tony Marino to win the Detroit version of NWA World Tag Team Championship a second time. On January 5, 1973, they lost the titles back to Von Hess and Von Shotz. They received their third Detroit titles on February 2 and lost it back to Von Hess and Von Shotz on February 18.

== Later life and death ==
Curry's son Fred III is currently pursuing a career in pro-wrestling and was being trained by Dory Funk, Jr. Fred III has taken the high-flying style similar to his father. He is currently wrestling in the independent circuit in the Northeastern United States.

Curry died on April 3, 2026, at the age of 82.

== Championships and accomplishments ==
- 50th State Big Time Wrestling
  - NWA Hawaii Heavyweight Championship (1 time)
- NWA Detroit
  - NWA World Tag Team Championship (Detroit version) (9 times) - with Billy Red Lyons (1), Dan Miller (1), Tony Marino (4), Luis Martinez (1), Bobo Brazil (1), and Hank Miller (1)
- NWA Big Time Wrestling
  - NWA American Tag Team Championship (1 time) - with Fritz Von Erich
  - NWA International Tag Team Championship (1 time) – with "Wild Bull" Curry
  - NWA Texas Junior Heavyweight Championship (1 time)
- National Wrestling Federation
  - NWF World Tag Team Championship (1 time) - with Luis Martínez
- Pro Wrestling Illustrated
  - PWI Most Popular Wrestler of the Year (1972) tied with Jack Brisco
