= Billy Red Lyons =

Canadian professional wrestler (1932–2009)

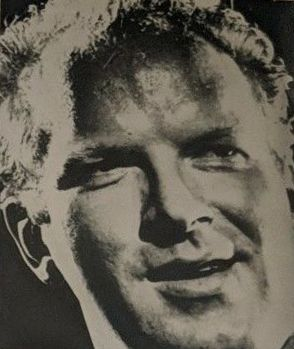
- Lyons as the AWA British Empire Heavyweight Champion, c. 1969

Personal information
- Born: Willem Snip; 17 May 1932 Ancaster, Ontario, Canada
- Died: 22 June 2009 (aged 77)
- Spouse: Norma Thomson Snip
- Children: 3

Professional wrestling career
- Ring name(s): Billy Red Lyons; Crusader #1
- Billed height: 6 ft 2 in (188 cm)
- Billed weight: 245 lb (111 kg)
- Trained by: Jimmy Simms
- Debut: 1956
- Retired: 1985

Willem Snip (17 May 1932 – 22 June 2009) was a Canadian professional wrestler, who wrestled under the ring name Billy Red Lyons. He was an active wrestler between 1956 and 1985, and won numerous championships throughout his career. He worked for promotions in both Canada and the United States, particularly in Ontario, California, Minneapolis, Texas, New York, Georgia, Oklahoma and Japan

Lyons won numerous tag team championships throughout his career, including with Dick Beyer, who was his real-life brother-in-law, as well as Fritz Von Erich, Bill Watts, and Ray Gunkel. He also won singles championships, including the NWA Texas Heavyweight Championship. Lyons also wrestled in the World Wrestling Federation (WWF) at various times between 1976 and 1985.

After his retirement from in-ring competition, he would work for Maple Leaf Wrestling in Toronto and the World Wrestling Federation.

== Professional wrestling career ==
Snip made his debut in 1956, under the name Billy Lyons, but soon became known as Billy Red Lyons, due to the colour of his hair. During the first years of his career, he wrestle against future world champions, including Buddy Rogers and Gene Kiniski.

During his career, he held several tag team championships with Dick Beyer, who was his real-life brother-in-law, as well as Fritz Von Erich, Bill Watts, and Ray Gunkel. He won his first championship in February 1958, when he teamed with Ray Gunkel to win the NWA International Tag Team Championship. Three years later, he won the NWA Canadian Open Tag Team Championship with Ilio DiPaolo, by defeating Stan Kowalski and Tiny Mills on January 26, 1961. Lyons and DiPaolo were the last champions, however, as the championships was abandoned and replaced with the Toronto version of the NWA International Tag Team Championship a few months later. Lyons eventually won this championship with Whipper Billy Watson on March 28, 1962, by defeating Chris and John Tolos. They lost the championship to Bulldog Brower and Sweet Daddy Siki five days later on April 2. On March 27, 1965, Lyons teamed with Beyer, who was using the ring name The Destroyer, to win the AWA World Tag Team Championship from Don Manoukian and Ray Stevens. On June 3, 1965, they won the All Asia Tag Team Championship in the Japan Wrestling Association from Giant Baba and Toyonobori. They lost the championship to Baba and Tonobori just over a month later on July 15, 1965. While wrestling in the American Wrestling Association in the 1960s, Lyons was billed as the AWA British Empire Heavyweight Champion.

In 1967, Lyons won his first singles championship, by defeating Duke Keomuka by forfeit in the finals of a tournament in San Antonio, Texas, to win the NWA Texas Heavyweight Championship on November 8. He held the championship for nearly six months, eventually losing it to The Spoiler #1 on March 29, 1968, in Houston, Texas. During this time, he won the NWA American Tag Team Championship with Fritz von Erich on January 30, 1968, in Dallas, Texas, by defeating Gary Hart and Spoiler.

Lyons won the NWA United States Tag Team Championship (Tri-State version) with Bill Watts in January 1971, by defeating Buddy Roberts and Jerry Brown. They lost the championship to Karl Von Brauner and Waldo Von Erich in March, but Lyons won it back with Tom Jones by defeating The Spoilers (The Spoiler #1 and The Spoiler #2) on May 31. The following year, Lyons again teamed with Jones to win the NWA Mississippi Tag Team Championship in March 1972. Jones later said that Lyons was the "best partner I ever had", and credited Lyons with teaching him the psychology of wrestling. Throughout the late '60s and early '70s, he teamed with Red Bastien as The Flying Redheads, and on July 14, 1974, Lyons and Bastien won the NWA Texas Tag Team Championship by defeating Mike York and Frank Monte. They held the championship for three months, but lost it to Chris Colt and Bobby Duncum on October 6, 1972. Bastien later said that he and Lyons "were perfect for each other" as tag team partners. Fellow professional wrestler Blackjack Mulligan said that Bastien and Lyons "were the greatest team of all time", and that watching them wrestle was watching "pure tag team wrestling at its basic".

Following this, he returned to Toronto to compete for Maple Leaf Wrestling. He began teaming with Dewey Robertson in 1974, as the Crusaders, and they won the Toronto version of the NWA International Tag Team Championship on three occasions. They defeated Hartford and Reginald Love for the championship on June 23, 1974, but dropped it to them on September 8. They defeated them for the championship again on December 29, 1974. He also challenged Jack Brisco for the NWA World Heavyweight Championship in a 1974 Maple Leaf Gardens main event. On June 8, 1975, the Crusaders were beaten by the Kelly Twins (Pat and Mike) for the championship, but they won it back two months later on August 24. They were the final champions, however, as the championship was retired in September 1977.

Lyons would make appearances in the WWF in (1976) and have fourteen matches in (1978) followed by only one match in (1979). Lyons returned to the WWF in (1982) and wrestled a few matches a year until his final match in Erie, Pennsylvania on June 20, 1985, against Rene Goulet.

After his retirement from active competition in 1985, he settled in Toronto and began working for Maple Leaf Wrestling in Toronto as an assistant to promoters Frank and Jack Tunney. Shortly after he would become affiliated with the World Wrestling Federation when Jack Tunney allied Maple Leaf Wrestling with the American-based wrestling company. Lyons would serve as a WWF television announcer, interviewer and ring announcer. He became famous for his catchphrase, "Don't you dare miss it!" Backstage, he remained Jack Tunney's top assistant. Lyons was released in 1995, along with Tunney, due to budget cuts and dissolution of the WWF/Maple Leaf Wrestling association.

== Personal life and death ==
Snip was the real-life brother-in-law of Dick Beyer, with whom he won the All Asia Tag Team Championship. He was also a talented ice hockey player, before he became a professional wrestler. Greg Oliver, the producer of Canadian Online Explorer's wrestling section, described Snip as having a "sly, cheeky sense of humour", and a man that "never took himself too seriously". Away from wrestling he also did sales for a fence company and was a real estate agent. In 1995 he suffered a stroke. He recovered from the stroke by swimming.

He died on June 22, 2009, aged 77, from cancer, which had spread to his spine.

== Championships and accomplishments ==
- American Wrestling Association
  - AWA British Empire Heavyweight Championship (2 times)
- Big Time Wrestling (Detroit)
  - NWA World Tag Team Championship (Detroit version) (1 time) – with Fred Curry
- Japan Wrestling Association
  - All Asia Tag Team Championship (1 time) – with The Destroyer
- Georgia Championship Wrestling
  - NWA International Tag Team Championship (Georgia version) (1 time) - with Ray Gunkel
- Gulf Coast Championship Wrestling
  - NWA Mississippi Tag Team Championship (Gulf Coast version) (1 time) – with Tom Jones
- Maple Leaf Wrestling
  - NWA Canadian Open Tag Team Championship (1 time) – with Ilio DiPaolo
  - NWA International Tag Team Championship (Toronto version) (4 times) – with Whipper Billy Watson (1), and Dewey Robertson (3)
- NWA Big Time Wrestling
  - NWA American Heavyweight Championship (1 time)
  - NWA American Tag Team Championship (1 time) – with Fritz Von Erich
  - NWA Texas Heavyweight Championship (1 time)
  - NWA Texas Tag Team Championship (1 time) – with Red Bastien
- NWA Tri-State
  - NWA United States Tag Team Championship (Tri-State version) (2 times) – with Bill Watts (1) and Tom Jones (1)
- Professional Wrestling Hall of Fame
  - Class of 2018 - Inducted as part of The Flying Redheads with Red Bastien
- American Wrestling Alliance
  - AWA World Tag Team Championship (San Francisco version) (1 time) – with The Destroyer
- World Wrestling Alliance (San Francisco)
  - WWA World Tag Team Championship (1 time) - with The Destroyer
