= Blackjack Lanza =

American professional wrestler (1935–2021)

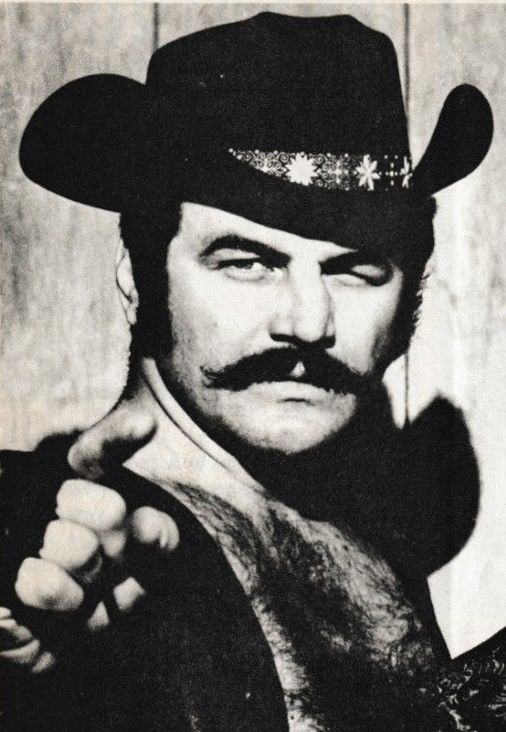
- Lanza in 1971

Personal information
- Born: John Mortl Lanzo; October 14, 1935 Minneapolis, Minnesota, U.S.
- Died: December 8, 2021 (aged 86)
- Education: University of Minnesota
- Spouse: Barbara Kalil (m. 1957)

Professional wrestling career
- Ring name(s): Blackjack Lanza; Jack Lanza; Joe Lanza
- Billed height: 6 ft 5 in (196 cm)
- Billed weight: 253 lb (115 kg)
- Billed from: Albuquerque, New Mexico; Laredo, Texas
- Trained by: Verne Gagne
- Debut: 1961
- Retired: 1985

John Mortl Lanzo (October 14, 1935 – December 8, 2021) was an American professional wrestler, better known by his ring name, Blackjack Lanza. Along with his long-term tag team partner, Blackjack Mulligan, Lanza was one-half of The Blackjacks: "black cowboy hat-wearing, cowboy boot-stomping, rugged hombres who drew money wherever they went".

From the 1960s to 1980s, Lanza wrestled for promotions such as the American Wrestling Association, World Wrestling Association, and the World Wide Wrestling Federation, winning the AWA World Tag Team Championship, WWA World Tag Team Championship, and WWWF World Tag Team Championship alongside Mulligan. He is a member of the WWE Hall of Fame and the Professional Wrestling Hall of Fame.

== Early life ==
Lanza was born on October 14, 1935, to William Lanza and Louise Mortl, and attended the University of Minnesota and worked as a sociology teacher.

== Professional wrestling career ==
=== Early career (1961–1962) ===
Lanza, from Minneapolis, Minnesota, was trained by local promoter Verne Gagne and started his wrestling career in 1961. He wrestled a few matches for NWA Mid-America in Birmingham, Alabama, under the name "Joe Lanza". In 1962, he briefly held the NWA Southern Junior Heavyweight Championship.

=== St. Louis Wrestling Club (1962–1963, 1966–1978) ===
Lanza had a sporadic wrestling career with the St. Louis Wrestling Club from 1962 to 1963 and again from 1966 to 1978. In February 1969, he had a 60-minute draw against former NWA World Heavyweight Champion Gene Kiniski, solidifying his status as an "instant contender."

=== American Wrestling Association (1962–1979) ===
In mid-1962, Lanza returned to Minnesota, where he joined Gagne's American Wrestling Association as Jack Lanza. He teamed with Bobby Duncum and was managed by Bobby Heenan. During his time in the company, his gimmick was that of a Western cowboy. The duo won the AWA World Tag Team Championship on July 23, 1976. In the 1970s, Lanza and Mulligan teamed up to form The Blackjacks. Lanza was a main-eventer when the duo began teaming together. They were managed by Bobby Heenan.

=== Mid-Atlantic Championship Wrestling (1963) ===
In 1963, Lanza joined the Charlotte, North Carolina–based Mid-Atlantic Championship Wrestling promotion, wrestling as "Jack Lanza". He left the promotion the following year.

=== World Wrestling Association (1967–1972) ===
Lanza wrestled for the Indianapolis, Indiana–based World Wrestling Association from 1967 to 1972. Accompanied by Bobby Heenan, he defeated Wilbur Snyder for the WWA World Heavyweight Championship in September 1967. His reign lasted until August 1969, when he was defeated by Dick the Bruiser. In 1971, The Blackjacks began wrestling in the WWA. In November 1971, they defeated Paul Christy and Wilbur Snyder for the WWA World Tag Team Championship. Their reign lasted until September 1972, when they lost to The Crusher and Dick the Bruiser.

=== World Wide Wrestling Federation (1973, 1975) ===
Lanza debuted in the World Wide Wrestling Federation in mid-1973 as "Blackjack Lanza". His regular opponents included André the Giant, Chief Jay Strongbow, and Dean Ho. He left the promotion in December 1973.

In 1975, The Blackjacks joined the WWWF. On August 26, 1975, they defeated Dominic DeNucci and Pat Barrett for the WWWF World Tag Team Championship. The match was a two-out-of-three falls match, and the Blackjacks won the match by winning the first and third falls. As part of his tenure in WWWF, Vince McMahon Sr. promised Lanza that he would receive one World singles title shot a month.

=== NWA Big Time Wrestling (1974–1975) ===
In January 1974, The Blackjacks joined the Dallas, Texas–based NWA Big Time Wrestling promotion. Later that month, they were named the NWA American Tag Team Champions. Their reign lasted until July 1974, when they were defeated by Ken Patera and Tex McKenzie. In December 1974, he won the vacant NWA American Heavyweight Championship. He lost the championship to Fritz Von Erich later that month.

=== Georgia Championship Wrestling (1979) ===
In 1979, Lanza wrestled for Georgia Championship Wrestling. He defeated Bob Armstrong for the NWA Georgia Television Championship in April, holding the championship until August 1979, when he was defeated by Ray Candy.

=== Late career (1979–1985) ===
After Georgia Championship Wrestling, Lanza was inactive from wrestling until 1983. He returned to AWA American Wrestling Association where he feuded with Bobby Heenan in bunkhouse matches defeating Heenan in all of them. That same year he reunited with Blackjack Mulligan working St. Louis and AWA. The Blackjacks broke up in 1984. He retired from wrestling in 1985 and worked for WWF as a road agent.

== Personal life ==
Lanza married Barbara Jean Kalil on September 28, 1957, and they lived in Douglas County, Minnesota.

== Death ==
On December 8, 2021, Jim Ross announced via Twitter that Lanza had died. He was 86 years old, and had been in poor health.

== Championships and accomplishments ==
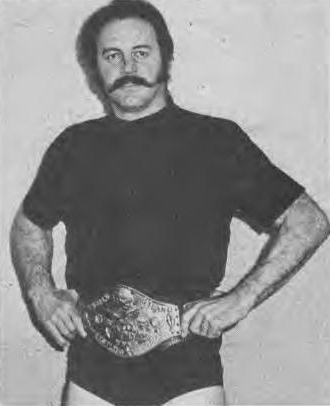
Lanza with the WWWF Tag Team Championship

- American Wrestling Association
  - AWA World Tag Team Championship (1 time) – with Bobby Duncum
  - AWA British Empire Heavyweight Championship (1 time)
- Georgia Championship Wrestling
  - NWA Georgia Television Championship (1 time)
- NWA Big Time Wrestling
  - NWA American Heavyweight Championship (1 time)
  - NWA American Tag Team Championship (1 time) – with Blackjack Mulligan
  - NWA Brass Knuckles Championship (Texas version) (3 times)
- NWA Mid-America
  - NWA Southern Junior Heavyweight Championship (1 time)
- Professional Wrestling Hall of Fame
  - Class of 2016 - Inducted as a member of The Blackjacks
- Pro Wrestling Illustrated
  - PWI ranked him # 338 of the 500 best singles wrestlers during the "PWI Years" in 2003.
- World Wrestling Association
  - WWA World Heavyweight Championship (1 time)
  - WWA World Tag Team Championship (1 time) – with Blackjack Mulligan
- World Wide Wrestling Federation / World Wrestling Entertainment
  - WWWF Tag Team Championship (1 time) – with Blackjack Mulligan
  - WWE Hall of Fame (Class of 2006) as a member of The Blackjacks
