= Moose Cholak =

American professional wrestler

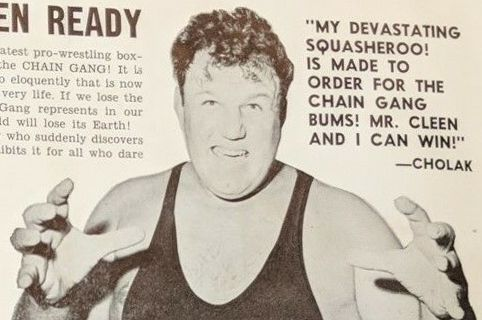

Personal information
- Born: Edward S. Cholak; March 17, 1930 Chicago, Illinois, U.S.
- Died: October 31, 2002 (aged 72) Hammond, Indiana, U.S.
- Spouse: Arlene Miller (m. 1957)
- Children: 2

Professional wrestling career
- Ring name(s): Moose Cholak; Eddie Cholak; Golden Moose; Golden Terror; Yukon Moose
- Billed height: 6 ft 4 in (1.93 m)
- Billed weight: 360 lb (160 kg)
- Billed from: Moosehead, Maine
- Trained by: Al Haft
- Debut: 1952
- Retired: 1987

Edward S. Cholak (March 17, 1930 – October 31, 2002) was an American professional wrestler better known by his ring name Moose Cholak.

Cholak competed in North American regional promotions from 1952 until 1987, primarily in the Midwest and northeast. The nearly 400-lb Cholak was known for wearing a moose head to the ring and giving a "moose call" prior to his matches.

== Career ==
A native of Chicago's Southeast Side, Cholak was an all-city wrestling champion and an AAU amateur champion at Chicago Vocational High School. Cholak played tackle for the University of Wisconsin football team, but left after one year to join the Navy during the Korean War. In addition to boxing and wrestling in the service, he was also trained as SeaBee engineer.

After leaving the navy in 1952, Cholak was recruited into professional wrestling by former AWA World Heavyweight champion, Chief Don Eagle. Cholak was trained by Columbus, Ohio promoter and former NWA vice president, Al Haft.

Between 1953 and 1987, Cholak wrestled in 8,000 matches. Cholak's moose gimmick and finishing move "El Squasho" as well as the big splash finishing move made him a star in the early years of televised wrestling, including Wrestling from Marigold and Wrestling from the International Amphitheater that both originated from Chicago. Among his many singles and tag-team championships, Cholak won the International Wrestling Association championship in Japan in 1963, defeating Rikidozan.

== Later life ==
From 1976 to 1996, Cholak supplemented his wrestling income by working as an engineer for Chicago's Streets and Sanitation Department. On nights and weekends when he wasn't booked to wrestle, Cholak also worked in his family's tavern, Calumet Beach Inn. Cholak met Arlene, his wife of 45 years, at the tavern.

Eventually weighing over 400 pounds, Cholak died of complications from a stroke on October 31, 2002, in a Hammond, Indiana hospital at the age of 72.

== Championships and accomplishments ==
- Big Time Wrestling
  - NWA World Tag Team Championship (Detroit version) (1 time) – with Ed George
- Buffalo Athletic Club
  - NWA North American Heavyweight Championship (Buffalo/Cleveland version) (1 time)
  - NWA World Tag Team Championship (Buffalo Athletic Club version) (1 time) – with Johnny Powers
- International Wrestling Association
  - IWA World Heavyweight Championship (1 time)
- World Wrestling Association (Indianapolis)
  - WWA World Tag Team Championship (3 times) – with Wilbur Snyder (2) and Paul Christy (1)
- World Wrestling Association (New Mexico)
  - WWA World Heavyweight Championship (1 time)
