= Tokyo Pro Wrestling =

Professional wrestling promotion

Tokyo Professional Wrestling
- Logo 1994–1996
- Acronym: TPW
- Headquarters: Tokyo
- Founder: Michiharu Sadano

Tokyo Professional Wrestling was a Japanese professional wrestling promotion which operated from 1966 to 1967.

== History ==
In mid-1966, Japan Wrestling Association president Michiharu Toyonobori resigned his position and left the promotion, taking along with him some talent, including Katsuhisa Shibata (father of current All Elite Wrestling star Katsuyori Shibata) and the future Rusher Kimura (Masao Kimura). Antonio Inoki, who was coming back from a long excursion to the United States, chose to join him and create a new venture, Tokyo Pro Wrestling. Despite the name, the promotion toured all over Japan during its existence.

Tokyo Pro's biggest rising star was Inoki, who feuded with Johnny Valentine over the "United States" heavyweight title (as Valentine had held in California, Michigan and Ontario, he was "recognized" as champion by Tokyo Pro so as to lose the belt to Inoki). Inoki's feud with Valentine cemented him not only as a rising star, but also as a tough wrestler who could take on anyone, any style, anywhere.

Nevertheless, problems between Toyonobori and his business backers led him and Isao Yoshiwara to dissolve the promotion in 1967 . Most of the roster joined International Wrestling Enterprise, which would promote on a larger scale in Japan and eventually become the third most important men's promotion, after New Japan and All Japan, which would appear in 1972.

Tokyo Pro-Wrestling is also the place where Haruka Eigen, who was still active into his 60s wrestling for Pro Wrestling Noah, debuted. He joined Inoki and Shibata in going back to JWA.

=== Alumni ===
==== Natives ====
- Toyonobori - joined IWE
- Antonio Inoki - joined JWA
- Masanori Saito - returned to the United States
- Masao Kimura - joined IWE
- Masaru Eigen - joined JWA
- Katsuhisa Shibata - joined JWA
- Sankichi Takasakiyama (Shoji Kai) - joined JWA
- Tsuyoshi Sendai (Tokyo Joe/Joe Daigo) - joined IWE
- Takeshi Oiso - joined IWE
- Tadaharu Tanaka - joined IWE
- Isamu Teranishi - joined IWE
- Iwao Takeshita - joined IWE
- Mammoth Suzuki - joined IWE
- Mr. Suzuki/Matty Suzuki - joined IWE
- Teruo Kaneda - joined IWE
- Hiroshi Nakagawa - retired

==== Foreigners ====
- Johnny Valentine
- Johnny Powers
- Sonny Myers
- Dean Higuchi
- Stan Stasiak
- Steve Stanlee
- Eddie Graham
- Kentuckians (Luke Brown and Grizzly Smith)
- Danny Hodge
- Lucky Simunovich
- Mysterious Medico (Lou Newman)

=== Championships ===
==== United States Heavyweight Championship ====
Key
No.	Overall reign number
Reign	Reign number for the specific champion
Days	Number of days held

No.	Champion	Championship change			Reign statistics		Notes	Ref.
No.	Champion	Date	Event	Location	Reign	Days	Notes	Ref.
1	Johnny Valentine	October 25, 1966	Live event	Sendai, Japan	1	25	Defends Toronto version of the title against Antonio Inoki and is recognized as champion by Tokyo Pro Wrestling.	
2	Antonio Inoki	November 19, 1966	Live event	Osaka, Japan	1	98		
—	Deactivated	January 31, 1967	—	—	—	—	Title retired when Tokyo Pro Wrestling closed. Inoki returns to Japan Pro Wrestling Alliance, while Valentine returns to Maple Leaf Wrestling and continues being recognized as champion as if the losses had never happened.	

==== NWA World Tag Team Championship ====
Key
No.	Overall reign number
Reign	Reign number for the specific champion
Days	Number of days held

No.	Champion	Championship change			Reign statistics		Notes	Ref.
No.	Champion	Date	Event	Location	Reign	Days	Notes	Ref.
1	Antonio Inoki and Hiro Matsuda	January 6, 1967	IWE Pioneer Series	Osaka, Japan	1	25	Defeat the Kentuckians (Luke Brown and Grizzly Smith), Tokyo Pro claims the match is a defense of the Mid-America version of the NWA World Tag Team Championship, which Inoki and Matsuda originally won on January 24, 1966 in Memphis. All Tokyo Pro cards in January 1967 were jointly promoted with International Wrestling Enterprise, to which Matsuda belonged at the time.	
—	Deactivated	January 31, 1967	—	—	—	—	Title retired when Tokyo Pro Wrestling closed. Inoki returns to Japan Pro Wrestling Alliance while Matsuda returns to the United States.	

== See also ==
- Professional wrestling in Japan
