= WWA World Heavyweight Championship (Indianapolis) =

Details
- Promotion: World Wrestling Association
- Date established: April 22, 1964
- Date retired: 1989
Statistics
- First champion(s): Dick the Bruiser
- Final champion(s): Golden Lion
- Most reigns: Dick the Bruiser (13 reigns)
- Longest reign: Golden Lion (938 days)
- Shortest reign: Ernie Ladd (28 days)

The WWA World Heavyweight Championship was a professional wrestling world heavyweight championship in the Indianapolis-based World Wrestling Association from the promotion's formation in 1964 until the late 1980s.

== Title history ==
Key
No.	Overall reign number
Reign	Reign number for the specific champion
Days	Number of days held

No.	Champion	Championship change			Reign statistics		Notes	Ref.
No.	Champion	Date	Event	Location	Reign	Days	Notes	Ref.
1	Dick the Bruiser	April 22, 1964	WWA show	Los Angeles, California	1	324	Defeated Freddie Blassie for the Los Angeles version of the championship; starts his own promotion in Indiana.	
—	Vacated	March 12, 1965	—	Indianapolis, Indiana	—	—	After a match in which the Bruiser is disqualified against Johnny Valentine.	
2	Dick the Bruiser	April 10, 1965	WWA show	Indianapolis, Indiana	2	133	Defeated Johnny Valentine in rematch.	
3	Gene Kiniski	August 21, 1965	WWA show	Indianapolis, Indiana	1	126		
4	Dick the Bruiser	December 25, 1965	WWA show	Indianapolis, Indiana	3	287	Loses a unification match against AWA champion Mad Dog Vachon on March 26, 1966 in Chicago, IL but continues to be recognized in Indianapolis and other WWA towns (WWA started working with AWA and AWA titles are recognized in Chicago thereafter).	
5	Mitsu Arakawa	October 8, 1966	WWA show	Indianapolis, Indiana	1	357		
6	Wilbur Snyder	September 30, 1967	WWA show	Indianapolis, Indiana	1	88		
7	Blackjack Lanza	December 27, 1967	WWA show	Indianapolis, Indiana	1	611		
8	Dick the Bruiser	August 29, 1969	WWA show	Indianapolis, Indiana	4	190		
9	Baron von Raschke	March 7, 1970	WWA show	Indianapolis, Indiana	1	586		
10	Dick the Bruiser	October 14, 1971	WWA show	Indianapolis, Indiana	5	43	Repeated on October 23, 1971 in Detroit, Michigan.	
11	Baron von Raschke	November 26, 1971	WWA show	Detroit, Michigan	2	116	Repeated in Indianapolis, Indiana on November 29, 1971; Dick the Bruiser Defeated Raschke in a death match on March 18, 1972 in Detroit, Michigan but is stripped in April 1972 with the match having no falls.	
12	Billy Red Cloud	March 21, 1972	WWA show	Indianapolis, Indiana	1	35	Raschke continues to be billed as champion in Elkhart, IN where he loses to Art Thomas on March 25, 1972; Thomas also recognized as champion in Detroit; the Detroit version is held-up after a match between Thomas and Baron Von Raschke on May 20, 1972 in Detroit, MI.	
13	Art Thomas	April 25, 1972	WWA show	Minneapolis, Minnesota	1	25		
—	Vacated	May 20, 1972	—	Detroit, Michigan	—	—	After a match against Baron von Raschke.	
14	Baron von Raschke	June 3, 1972	WWA show	Detroit, Michigan	3	301	Defeated Red Cloud for the recognition in Indianapolis; also Defeated Art Thomas for the held-up Detroit version on June 3, 1972 in Detroit, Michigan.	
15	Bob Ellis	March 31, 1973	WWA show	Indianapolis, Indiana	1	N/A		
16	Jimmy Valiant	January 1974	WWA show	Detroit, Michigan	1	N/A		
17	Bob Ellis	May 12, 1974	WWA show	Detroit, Michigan	2	90		
18	Ox Baker	August 10, 1974	WWA show	Indianapolis, Indiana	1	476		
19	Pepper Gomez	November 29, 1975	WWA show	Indianapolis, Indiana	1	154		
20	Masked Strangler	May 1, 1976	WWA show	Indianapolis, Indiana	1	308		
21	Dick the Bruiser	March 5, 1977	WWA show	Indianapolis, Indiana	6	56		
—	Vacated	April 30, 1977	—	—	—	—	After a match against Ivan Koloff.	
22	Ivan Koloff	June 18, 1977	WWA show	Indianapolis, Indiana	1	147	Wins rematch.	
—	Vacated	November 12, 1977	—	—	—	—	After a match against Dick the Bruiser.	
23	Dick the Bruiser	December 26, 1977	WWA show	Indianapolis, Indiana	7	488	Wins rematch.	
—	Vacated	April 28, 1979	—	—	—	—	After a match against King Kong Brody.	
24	Dick the Bruiser	June 9, 1979	WWA show	Indianapolis, Indiana	8	56	Defeated King Kong Brody.	
25	King Kong Brody	August 4, 1979	WWA show	Indianapolis, Indiana	1	301		
26	Dick the Bruiser	May 31, 1980	WWA show	Indianapolis, Indiana	9	126		
—	Vacated	October 4, 1980	—	Indianapolis, Indiana	—	—	After a match against Ernie Ladd.	
27	Ernie Ladd	November 1, 1980	WWA show	Indianapolis, Indiana	1	28	Wins rematch.	
28	Dick the Bruiser	November 29, 1980	WWA show	Indianapolis, Indiana	10	147		
29	Johnny Valiant	April 25, 1981	WWA show	Indianapolis, Indiana	1	N/A		
30	Dick the Bruiser	April 1981	WWA show	N/A	11	N/A		
31	Bobo Brazil	July 24, 1981	WWA show	Bartonville, Illinois	1	79		
32	Blackjack Mulligan	October 11, 1981	WWA show	Indianapolis, Indiana	1	N/A		
33	Bobo Brazil	November 1981	WWA show	Knoxville, Tennessee	2	N/A		
—	Vacated	February 13, 1982	—	—	—	—	After a match against Harley Race where Race pins Brazil after using an illegal piledriver.	
34	Harley Race	April 24, 1982	WWA show	Indianapolis, Indiana	1	N/A	Defeated Brazil in rematch; Brazil continues to defend in smaller towns.	
35	Dick the Bruiser	January 1983	WWA show	N/A	12	N/A	Awarded title.	
36	Bobby Colt	June 25, 1983	WWA show	Indianapolis, Indiana	1	196		
37	Spike Huber	January 7, 1984	WWA show	Indianapolis, Indiana	1	N/A		
38	Stormy Granzig	July 1984	WWA show	Terre Haute, Indiana	1	N/A	Phantom title change—Huber is fired after splitting with Bruiser's daughter.	
39	Greg Wojokowski	October 1984	WWA show	Indianapolis, Indiana	1	N/A		
40	Dick the Bruiser	January 29, 1985	WWA show	Indianapolis, Indiana	13	N/A		
41	Greg Wojokowski	September 1985	WWA show	N/A	2	N/A		
42	Scott Rechsteiner	August 14, 1986	WWA show	Dearborn, Michigan	1	262		
43	Greg Wojokowski	May 3, 1987	WWA show	Toledo, Ohio	3	N/A		
—	Vacated	1988	—	—	—	—	Wojokowski retired	
44	Calypso Jim	1988	WWA show	Fort Wayne, Indiana	1	N/A		
45	Golden Lion	April 16, 1989	WWA show	Fort Wayne, Indiana	1	N/A		
—	Deactivated	1989	—	—	—	—	Promotion closed.	
