= Tony Marino =

American professional wrestler (1931–2021)

Personal information
- Born: Tony Silipini; April 20, 1931 Rochester, New York, U.S.
- Died: May 28, 2021 (aged 90)
- Family: Lady Frost (granddaughter)

Professional wrestling career
- Ring name(s): Battman; Caped Crusade; Devil Blue; Dino Lanza; Tony Marino
- Billed height: 5 ft 9 in (175 cm)
- Billed weight: 235 lb (107 kg)
- Trained by: Pedro Martinez
- Debut: 1954
- Retired: 1987

Tony Silipini (April 20, 1931 – May 28, 2021) was an American professional wrestler better known by his ring name Tony Marino.

== Professional wrestling career ==
=== Early career (1954–1963) ===
Tony Silipini was born in 1931. He started wrestling in 1954 near his hometown of Rochester, NY. He wrestled under a number of names over the years in different areas of the country. In Australia he was called Dino Lanza.

=== World Wide Wrestling Federation (1963–1972) ===
Marino started wrestling in the WWWF in 1963 in preliminary matches. With the Batman craze sweeping the country in 1966, Marino created a wrestling version of the superhero. His custom outfits were created by Karl & Hildegarde's of Columbus, Ohio. He debuted the persona in the Buffalo, NY area and had a smaller wrestler dressed as Robin. Bruno Sammartino, who had purchased the promotional office in Pittsburgh, Pennsylvania, brought Marino into Pittsburgh as "Battman" and installed him as a major wrestler in the territory. As The Battman, Marino became a fixture and very popular wrestler on Pittsburgh's very popular Studio Wrestling TV show. By 1970 the Batman gimmick was phased out.

==== Teaming with Bruno Sammartino ====
He formed a tag team with WWWF World Heavyweight Champion Bruno Sammartino. Marino wrestled with a mask as "The Battman" on the Pittsburgh circuit.

==== Teaming with Victor Rivera and return to singles ====
On December 9, 1969, Tony teamed with Victor Rivera in Madison Square Garden, where they defeated WWWF International Tag Team Champions Professor Toru Tanaka and Mitsu Arakawa in 2 straight falls. Marino and Rivera were the tag champions for almost seven months. Along the way, they scored wins over Killer Kowalski and Waldo Von Erich at Madison Square Garden, and Kowalski and Krippler Karl Kovacs at Sunnyside Gardens, Queens, NY. On June 15, 1970, at Madison Square Garden, they lost their titles 2 falls to 1 to The Mongols, the team of Bepo Mongol and Geto Mongol. Both tag teams were undefeated up to that point. After the Battman gimmick was obsolete, Marino returned to jobbing. In a 1971 match against George The Animal Steele, Marino broke his leg. In 1972, Marino left the WWWF.

=== National Wrestling Alliance (1972–1987) ===
In 1972, Marino started traveling in National Wrestling Alliance territories. In December 1972, he defeated Kurt Von Hess and Karl Von Shotz along with Fred Curry to win the Detroit version of NWA World Tag Team Championship. On January 5, 1973, they lost the titles to Kurt Von Hess and Karl Von Shotz. They received their second Detroit titles on February 2 and lost it to Kurt Von Hess and Karl Von Shotz on February 18.

Marino had then notable feuds with The Stomper, Ben Justice and Killer Tim Brooks. In 1974, he formed a tag team with Bobo Brazil. They defeated Kurt Von Hess and Karl Von Shotz to win the Detroit titles. Marino got his third Detroit Tag Team Championship. The titles were held up in June 1974 in match against Ben Justice and Killer Tim Brooks. They won rematch on June 15. They lost their titles to Killer Tim Brooks and Abdullah the Butcher. They defeated Killer Tim Brooks and Abdullah the Butcher and received the titles back. They lost the titles to The Mongols and this was Marino's final Detroit Tag Team Championship.

Marino retired from wrestling in 1987.

== Personal life and death ==
Marino's granddaughter, who wrestles as Lady Frost, participated at the NWA 73rd Anniversary Show.

Marino died at the age of 90 on May 28, 2021.

== Championships and accomplishments ==
- Big Time Wrestling (Detroit)
  - NWA World Tag Team Championship (Detroit version) (7 times) – with Fred Curry (4) and Bobo Brazil (3)
- West Virginia
  - West Virginia Tag Team Championship (2 times) – with José Marino
- World Wide Wrestling Federation
  - WWWF International Tag Team Championship (2 times) – with Bruno Sammartino (1 time) and Victor Rivera (1 time)
