= Sailor Art Thomas =

American professional wrestler and bodybuilder

Seaman Art Thomas

Personal information
- Born: Arthur Thomas; January 30, 1924 Gurdon, Arkansas, U.S.
- Died: March 20, 2003 (aged 79) Fitchburg, Wisconsin, U.S.
- Cause of death: Cancer
- Children: 7

Professional wrestling career
- Ring name(s): Art Thomas; The Body; Hercules; Sailor Thomas
- Billed height: 6 ft 6 in (1.98 m)
- Billed weight: 265 lb (120 kg)
- Billed from: Fitchburg, Wisconsin
- Debut: 1943
- Retired: 1981

Arthur Thomas (January 30, 1924 – March 20, 2003), better known as Sailor Art Thomas or Seaman Art Thomas, was an American Merchant Mariner, bodybuilder, and professional wrestler. A WWA World Heavyweight Champion, Thomas was posthumously inducted into the WWE Hall of Fame in 2016.

== Early life ==
Thomas was born in Gurdon, Arkansas, the son of Alfred and Jessie (Lunon) Thomas. In 1935, he moved to Madison, Wisconsin. After his mother's death he was raised in a Wisconsin orphanage and in foster homes.

== Merchant Marine career ==
Thomas spent 27 months in the United States Merchant Marine. Serving in a construction battalion, Thomas helped build an airstrip in Guam.

== Professional wrestling career ==
After leaving the Merchant Marine, Thomas worked for Greyhound Lines before becoming a professional bodybuilder. After joining a bodybuilding troupe, he began touring the United States. After being spotted by promoter Jimmy Demetral, Thomas trained as a professional wrestler. He made his debut in 1943. Thomas would usually be introduced as a "just discharged" Navy seaman, wearing a regulation "crackerjack" uniform and pea coat, and enter the ring as a plant to oppose the villain's dishonorable tactics.

Throughout the early 1960s, Thomas won a series of tag team championships around North America: the Worldwide Wrestling Associates International Television Tag Team Championship with Lou Thesz in California, the Maple Leaf Wrestling NWA International Tag Team Championship with John Paul Henning in Toronto, and the NWA Detroit World Tag Team Championship with Bobo Brazil in Detroit. In 1962 and 1963, Thomas won the NWA Texas Heavyweight Championship in the Texas-based Southwest Sports promotion on two occasions. Thomas also competed for the World Wide Wrestling Federation from 1963 to 1964, teaming with Bobo Brazil and Bruno Sammartino.

In April 1972, Thomas won the WWA World Heavyweight Championship of the Indianapolis-based World Wrestling Association, defeating Baron von Raschke. The title was held up the next month after a bout between Thomas and von Raschke.

Thomas retired in 1981.

== Personal life ==
Thomas had seven children. He died of cancer only a month after being diagnosed with it.

== Championships and accomplishments ==
- Big Time Wrestling
  - NWA World Tag Team Championship (Detroit version) (1 time) – with Bobo Brazil
- Maple Leaf Wrestling
  - NWA International Tag Team Championship (Toronto version) (3 times) – with John Paul Henning
- Southwest Sports
  - NWA Texas Heavyweight Championship (2 times)
- World Wrestling Association
  - WWA World Heavyweight Championship (1 time)
- Worldwide Wrestling Associates
  - WWA International Television Tag Team Championship (1 time) – with Lou Thesz
- WWE
  - WWE Hall of Fame (Class of 2016)
