= Chris Colt =

American wrestler

Personal information
- Born: Charles Fay Harris; June 22, 1946 Orofino, Idaho, United States
- Died: May 23, 1995 (aged 48) Seattle, Washington, United States

Professional wrestling career
- Ring name(s): Chris Colt; Chris Colt III; Christopher Colt; Chris Von Colt; Chuck Dupree; Chuck Harris; Hell's Angel #2; Jim Dillinger; Maurice Chevier; The Magnificent Chevier; Don Juan The Magnificent; Mike Stallings; Paul Dupree; American Dream; American Dream Machine; Charles Harris
- Billed height: 5 ft 10 in (178 cm)
- Billed weight: 238 lb (108 kg)
- Debut: 1964
- Retired: December 1987

Charles Fay Harris (June 22, 1946 – May 23, 1995) was an American professional wrestler who worked as Chris Colt for a variety of different wrestling promotions in the United States such as Big Time Wrestling (Detroit), NWA All-Star Wrestling, American Wrestling Association, and Pacific Northwest Wrestling. He also competed as Paul Dupree, Jim Dillinger, Chuck Dupree and Chris Von Colt.

== Professional wrestling career ==
Colt made his professional wrestling debut in 1964 in Massachusetts. In 1966, he formed a tag team with Ron Dupree as the Hell's Angels, a biker-themed tag team, in Phoenix, Arizona. Sometimes they were known as the California Hell's Angels or Comancheros. In 1968, the duo burned the American flag (kayfabe) in Phoenix on TV which the promotion shut down due to the incident. They would win many tag team titles in Phoenix, and Detroit until breaking up in 1971.

In 1969, he formed a tag team with Jack Dillinger as the Chain Gang. Colt became Jim Dillinger. They won the WWA World Tag Team Championship in Indianapolis from 1969 to 1970.

In 1974, Colt reunited with Ron Dupree as the Hells Angels in the Gulf Coast, winning the NWA Gulf Coast Tag Team Championship twice. The team suddenly ended on October 17, 1975, when Ron Dupree died from a heart attack while ring announcing. Afterwards, Colt would focus more on his singles career and changed his gimmick to that of a rocker.

Colt won his first singles title the NWA Mississippi Heavyweight Championship defeating Cowboy Bob Kelly in March 1975.

Superstar mainstay "Crazy" Chris Colt used Alice Cooper's "Welcome to My Nightmare" as his entrance music. This is one of the earliest instances of a promotion playing theme music for wrestlers.

In an infamous incident in Phoenix that took place in 1975, Colt was high on LSD during a cage match seeing spiders all around due to hallucinations. He fled the venue fighting with both the fans and arena security.

Colt made his debut in Vancouver, Canada for NWA All-Star Wrestling in 1979 winning the NWA Canadian Tag Team Championship (Vancouver version) twice with Bobby Jaggers and Buddy Rose. He worked in Vancouver until 1982. Also in 1979, he made his debut in Portland, Oregon for Pacific Northwest where he quickly became a star.

Later in his career, he worked for Dave McKigney's Big Bear Promotions in Ontario, Alabama, and Oregon. He changed his character in Alabama as Chris Von Colt to a neo-nazi gimmick. Colt's last known matches happened in December 1987 for Portland Wrestling.

== Personal life ==
Colt was openly homosexual and appeared in gay-themed adult films after he retired from wrestling. Colt and his tag team partner Ron Dupree were a romantic couple outside of wrestling. Ron died of a heart attack during a professional wrestling show in Washington state in 1975 with Colt present. The ring name "Chris Colt" derived from Colt Studio Group, a gay American pornographic group.

== Death ==
After years of drug and alcohol addictions, Colt died on May 23, 1995, in a Seattle homeless shelter, allegedly due to complications from AIDS. His niece said he died in an alley, and a friend said that he died with a needle in his arm. It is not known if his death was caused by an accidental overdose or suicide. No autopsy was done. He was 48 years old.

Colt was featured on Vice Media's Dark Side of the Ring season 5 broadcast on April 9, 2024.

== Championships and accomplishments ==
- Arizona Athletic Association Inc.
  - Arizona Heavyweight Championship (1 time)
  - World Tag Team Championship (4 times) - with Ron Dupree (4)
- Big Bear Promotions
  - North American Heavyweight Championship (4 times)
- NWA Detroit
  - NWA World Tag Team Championship (Detroit version) (5 times) – with Ron Dupree (3) Lanny Poffo (1) and Count Drummer (1)
- NWA Mid-America
  - NWA Mid-America Heavyweight Championship (2 times)
  - NWA Six-Man Tag Team Championship (1 time) – with Tojo Yamamoto and Dennis Condrey (1)
- NWA Gulf Coast Championship Wrestling
  - NWA Mississippi Heavyweight Championship (1 time)
- NWA All-Star Wrestling
  - NWA Canadian Tag Team Championship (Vancouver version) (2 time) – with Buddy Rose (1) and Bobby Jaggers (1)
- NWA Big Time Wrestling
  - NWA Texas Tag Team Championship (1 time) - with Bobby Duncum
- World Wrestling Association
  - WWA World Tag Team Championship (1 time) – with Don Fargo (1 time)
