= Bobo Brazil =

American professional wrestler (1924–1998)

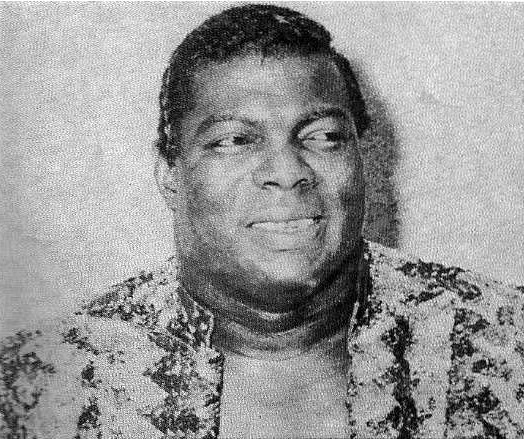
- Brazil in 1972

Personal information
- Born: Houston Harris; July 10, 1924 Little Rock, Arkansas, U.S.
- Died: January 20, 1998 (aged 73) St. Joseph, Michigan, U.S.
- Children: 6

Professional wrestling career
- Ring name(s): Bobo Brazil; Boo-Boo Brazil; BuBu Brasil; Houston Harris; Leroy Lincolnlog
- Billed height: 6 ft 6 in (198 cm)
- Billed weight: 270 lb (122 kg)
- Billed from: Benton Harbor, Michigan
- Trained by: Joe Savoldi
- Debut: 1951
- Retired: 1993

Houston Harris (July 10, 1924 – January 20, 1998) was an American professional wrestler, better known by his ring name Bobo Brazil. Credited with breaking down barriers of racial segregation in professional wrestling, Harris is considered one of the first Black professional wrestlers to be a marquee name in North America.

== Early life ==
Houston Harris was born on July 10, 1924, in Little Rock, Arkansas, but later lived in East St. Louis, Illinois, and Benton Harbor, Michigan. His father died when he was seven years old, which resulted in him doing odd jobs such as working on a local fruit farm for 50 cents a container. He played baseball in the Negro leagues for the House of David, where he was discovered to become a wrestler at a steel mill.

== Professional wrestling career ==
Harris was trained by Joe Savoldi after meeting him at matches at the Naval Armory. Savoldi originally named Harris "BuBu Brasil, The South American Giant," where he wrestled using a sequined satin cape stitched together by his wife, but a promoter misprinted his first name as "Bobo" in an advertisement, and the name stuck with Harris throughout his career. During that time, segregation in the South normally limited Black wrestlers to wrestling other Black wrestlers; Harris proved so popular that promoters put aside their prejudices in order to make money.

Brazil's first recorded match was on March 29, 1948, in Benton Harbor, wrestling as "Houston Harris, The Black Panther" against Armand Myers to a 30-minute draw. Harris was taught by Joe Savoldi to "be an honest athlete in the ring and never to take shortcuts on anybody to win a match. He was instilled to be a crowd’s friend right to the end." Finding success in Detroit, Brazil developed a fanbase among both the black and white populace with his modesty and stylish dress and professionalism, making him a big draw and an appealing babyface to both races of fans. Bobo spent most of his early career in the North wrestling for WWWF (now WWE), Big Time Wrestling in Detroit, Maple Leaf Wrestling in Toronto, Ontario, Canada & Dick the Bruiser's WWA promotion in Chicago.

Brazil had many matches with competitors such as Killer Kowalski, Dick the Bruiser, Johnny Valentine, Haystacks Calhoun and The Sheik, who feuded with Brazil over the course of several decades, with a variety of their matches being acclaimed bloody matchups. These and other rivals would all fall victim to Brazil's finishing maneuver, the Coco Butt. Brazil also once wrestled Bill Miller to a draw, and challenged Bruno Sammartino for the WWWF World Heavyweight Championship in a battle of two top babyface competitors. On October 18, 1962, Brazil defeated "Nature Boy" Buddy Rogers by hitting him in the groin causing Rogers to be unable to continue. Brazil refused the championship and they met a couple of weeks later and Rogers won. At the time, the promoters were working a gimmick where the champion would be hit in the groin and the challenger wouldn't accept the title. The same scenario occurred in Toronto two weeks earlier with Bruno Sammartino and Rogers. Neither Brazil nor Sammartino were officially recognized by the NWA as having won the World Heavyweight Championship.

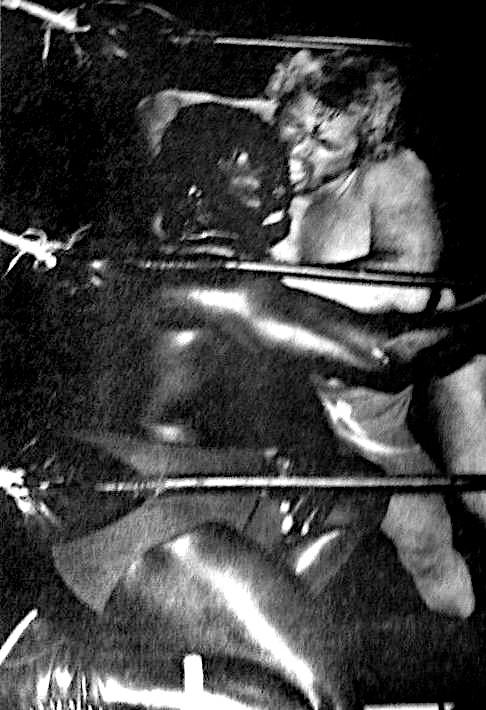
Brazil was known for his feud with The Sheik, which led to many bloody matches

On October 9, 1970, Brazil and El Mongol defeated Mr. Ito and The Great Ota in the first racially mixed match in Atlanta history. Brazil served as a mentor to wrestler "Soulman" Rocky Johnson and was inspirational to boxer Joe Frazier. Brazil's manager was James Dudley, the first African American to be in charge of a major arena in the United States. Dudley would run to the ring waving a towel, as Brazil followed behind. Brazil retired in 1993 after a four-decade career. His last official match was in Chicago, Illinois against Kelly Kiniski, son of rival Gene Kiniski. Brazil was inducted into the WWF Hall of Fame class of 1994 by longtime rival Ernie Ladd. The following year, Brazil inducted Ladd into the WWF Hall of Fame.

== Personal life ==
Harris had a wife and six children. After retiring from wrestling, he ran a restaurant called Bobo's Grill which lasted for more than 20 years.

Harris would later on train pro wrestler Kamala.

His son Karl (born 1952) wrestled as Bobo Brazil Jr. in the independent circuit. His brother wrestled as Hank James.

=== Death ===
Harris died on January 20, 1998, at the Lakeland Medical Center in St. Joseph, Michigan. He had been admitted to the hospital on January 14 and used a wheelchair, after suffering a series of strokes.

== Championships and accomplishments ==
- Big Time Wrestling (Detroit)
  - NWA United States Heavyweight Championship (Detroit version) (9 times)
  - NWA World Tag Team Championship (Detroit version) (8 times) – with Art Thomas (1), Bill Miller (1), Athol Layton (1), The Stomper (1), Tony Marino (3) and Fred Curry (1)
- Big Time Wrestling (San Francisco)
  - NWA United States Heavyweight Championship (San Francisco version) (1 time)
- Championship Wrestling from Florida
  - NWA Florida Tag Team Championship (2 times) – with Sweet Brown Sugar (1) and Dusty Rhodes (1)
- Eastern Sports Association
  - ESA North American Heavyweight Championship (1 time)
- International Professional Wrestling Hall of Fame
  - Class of 2023
- Japan Wrestling Association
  - NWA International Heavyweight Championship (2 times)
- Maple Leaf Wrestling
  - NWA Canadian Open Tag Team Championship (1 time) – with Whipper Billy Watson
  - NWA United States Heavyweight Championship (Toronto version) (1 time)
- Mid-Atlantic Championship Wrestling
  - NWA United States Heavyweight Championship (Mid-Atlantic version) (1 time)
- Midwest Wrestling Association (Ohio)
  - MWA Ohio Heavyweight Championship (1 time)
  - MWA Ohio Tag Team Championship (3 times) – with Frankie Talaber
- National Wrestling Alliance
  - NWA Hall of Fame (Class of 2013)
- NWA Hollywood Wrestling / Worldwide Wrestling Associates
  - NWA Americas Heavyweight Championship (3 times)
  - NWA "Beat the Champ" Television Championship (1 time)
  - NWA International Television Tag Team Championship (4 times) – with Wilbur Snyder (2), Sandor Szabo (1), and Primo Carnera (1)
  - NWA Pacific Coast Heavyweight Championship (Los Angeles version) (1 time)
  - WWA World Heavyweight Championship (2 times)
- Professional Wrestling Hall of Fame and Museum
  - Television Era (Class of 2008)
- Pro Wrestling Illustrated
  - PWI Editor's Award (1998)
- Superstars of Wrestling
  - SoW United States Heavyweight Championship (1 time)
- World Wrestling Association ''(Indianapolis)''
  - WWA World Heavyweight Championship (2 times)
  - WWA World Tag Team Championship (1 time) – with Chris Carter
- World Wide Wrestling Federation / World Wrestling Federation
  - WWWF United States Heavyweight Championship (7 times)
  - WWF Hall of Fame (Class of 1994)
- Wrestling Observer Newsletter
  - Wrestling Observer Newsletter Hall of Fame (Class of 1996)
- Other championships
  - World Negro Heavyweight Championship (2 times)

^{1} Not officially recognized as champion because conflicting interests
