= Earl Patrick Freeman =

Canadian professional wrestler (1932 – 1989)

- Ryan as Stampede North American Heavyweight Champion in 1978.

Personal information
- Born: August 23, 1932 Hamilton, Ontario, Canada
- Died: December 28, 1989 (aged 57) Port Moody, British Columbia, Canada

Professional wrestling career
- Ring name(s): Paddy Ryan; The Zebra Kid; Ace Freeman; Bud Freeman
- Billed height: 5 ft 10 in (1.78 m)
- Billed weight: 305 lb (138 kg)
- Debut: 1950s
- Retired: 1982

Earl Patrick Freeman (August 23, 1932 – December 28, 1989) was a Canadian professional wrestler, best known by his ring name Paddy Ryan, who competed in North American and international promotions during the 1950s and 60s.

While competing in western Canada and the Pacific Northwest, Freeman was involved in memorable feuds with Lumberjack Luke, Ripper Collins and "Crippler" Ray Stevens as a mainstay of NWA All-Star Wrestling, Pacific Northwest Wrestling and Stampede Wrestling during the late 1970s.

== Career ==
Born in Hamilton, Ontario, Freeman began wrestling professionally during the 1950s finding success in Northland Wrestling Enterprise in North Bay, Ontario, Renfrew, Ontario and Western Quebec as Bud Freeman. Competing in European and Japanese promotions during the 1970s as both Bud Freeman and The Zebra Kid, Freeman returned to North America in the 1970s. While wrestling for Buffalo promoter Pedro Martinez, he teamed with The Assassin against Johnny Fargo and Chief White Owl at the War Memorial Auditorium in Buffalo, New York, on March 22, 1972. Losing to Pampero Firpo on March 29, he would team with Luis Martinez against the Fargo Brothers (Don and Johnny Fargo) on April 29. After losing to Chief White Owl on May 24, he would leave for Canada later that year facing The Beast at the Ontario Place Forum in Toronto, Ontario on June 15, 1972.

As Paddy Ryan, Freeman would find great success in Superstar Championship Wrestling, teaming with John Quinn to defeat Ray Steele and Luke Brown for the SCW Western States Tag Team Championship in Seattle, Washington, on November 20, 1973. Freeman went on to defeat Eddie Sullivan for the SCW Western States Heavyweight Championship in 1975, though later lost the title to Ripper Sawyer. Additionally, he had a long standing feud with Lumberjack Luke.

After the close of SCW in 1976, Freeman appeared in Stampede Wrestling teaming with Bret Hart in his debut match against Mr. Hito and Mr. Sakurada in Saskatoon, Saskatchewan. In 1978, he would hold the Stampede North American Heavyweight Championship defeating Mr. Sakurada in Calgary, Alberta on September 1, 1978. He eventually lost the title to Kasavubu.

During the early 1980s, Ryan wrestled for Al Tomko's All-Star Wrestling based in Vancouver, British Columbia. Teaming with Chief Jay Strongbow and Goldie Rodgers, he also served as a mentor to younger wrestlers such as Greg Lake. After his retirement in 1982, he lived in Port Moody, British Columbia and because of difficult living and ring injuries, he remained in poor health before his death on December 28, 1989, following a massive heart attack.

== Championships and accomplishments ==
- Diamond Belt Championship Wrestling
  - DBCW Western States Heavyweight Championship (1 time)
- Stampede Wrestling
  - Stampede North American Heavyweight Championship (1 time)
- Superstar Championship Wrestling
  - SCW Western States Heavyweight Championship (1 time)
  - SCW Western States Tag Team Championship (1 time) - with John Quinn
