= Sugar Bear (disambiguation) =

Sugar Bear is an advertising cartoon mascot for Post Golden Crisp cereal.

Sugar Bear may also refer to:

- Kamala (wrestler) (1950–2020), American professional wrestler who was born James Harris and originally wrestled as "Sugar Bear" Harris
- Jimmy Lee Banks (1956–1982), American professional wrestler who wrestled as "Sugar Bear Brown"
- Ray Hamilton (defensive tackle) (born 1951), American football player who was nicknamed "Sugar Bear"
- George Scherger (1920–2011), American baseball player and coach who was nicknamed "Sugar Bear"
- Mike Thompson, father of Alana "Honey Boo Boo" Thompson, in the TLC reality show Here Comes Honey Boo Boo
- Central Arkansas Sugar Bears, the women's sports teams of the University of Central Arkansas
