= Stu Hart 50th Anniversary Show =

- Stu Hart with a bust of his head.
- Promotion: Stampede Wrestling
- Date: December 15, 1995
- City: Calgary, Alberta
- Venue: Stampede Corral
- Attendance: 4,700
- Tagline: Showdown at The Corral

Event chronology
← Previous; First	Next → Stampede Wrestling 50th Anniversary Show

The Stu Hart 50th Anniversary Show was a professional wrestling supercard produced by the Hart family that took place on December 15, 1995 at the Stampede Corral in Calgary, Alberta. Held in honor of Stu Hart, the event featured Stampede Wrestling alumni as well as talent from World Championship Wrestling and the World Wrestling Federation. It was the first event to feature an interpromotional "dream match" during the Monday Night War-era. The proceeds from the event were donated to the Calgary Quest Children's Society. Nine professional wrestling matches, two of which for championships, were featured on the card.

The main event was for the WWF World Heavyweight Championship, in which then-champion Bret Hart defeated the challenger Davey Boy Smith. Two featured bouts were scheduled on the undercard, including a tag team match between Bad Company (Bruce Hart and Brian Pillman) and the team of Dory Funk Jr. and Terry Funk, accompanied by Makhan Singh, which Hart and Pillman won via disqualification. The other match was an WWF Intercontinental Championship match, between defending champion Razor Ramon and Owen Hart, where Ramon defeated Hart by pinfall after a small package pin.

== Event ==
The Stu Hart 50th Anniversary Show featured employees other than the wrestlers involved in the matches. Ed Whalen was the commentator for the telecast. An edited hour-long version of the event was aired on CISA-DT. Besides employees appearing in a wrestling role, Angelo Mosca, Leo Burke, Tor Kamata, and members of Hart wrestling family all appeared on camera, either in backstage or ringside segments. Alberta Premier Ralph Klein, whose father Killer Klein had refereed for Hart during the 1950s, made a guest appearance to pay tribute to the Hart family. Abdullah the Butcher and Dean Douglas were booked to be at the event but later cancelled. The Wrestling Observer Newsletter reported that the original main event was scheduled to be Bret Hart versus Shawn Michaels for the WWF World Heavyweight Championship, however, Davey Boy Smith ended up replacing Michaels who was still recovering from a concussion.

Several wrestlers were inducted into the Stampede Wrestling Hall of Fame including Andre the Giant, Argentina Rocca, Billy Robinson, Brian Pillman, Chris Benoit, Edouard Carpentier, The Fabulous Moolah, Terry and Dory Funk Jr., Gorgeous George, Harley Race, Hiroshi Hase, Killer Kowalski, Jim Neidhart, Larry Cameron, Lou Thesz, Pat O'Connor, Stan Stasiak, Johnny Valentine, The British Bulldogs and the Hart family (Bret, Bruce, Keith and Owen Hart). In celebration of Stu Hart's 80th birthday, the wrestler was presented a bust of his own head for a special in-ring ceremony.

=== Preliminary matches ===
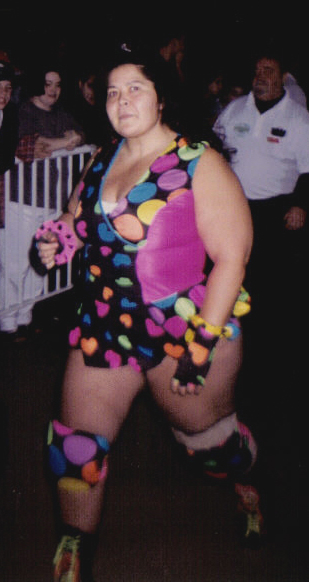
Rhonda Singh wrestled long time rival KC Houston.

The first match on the card was a tag team match between the team of The Cuban Assassin and Jerry Morrow facing the team of King Lau and Mike Anthony. It lasted 11 minutes and 27 seconds. The Cuban Assassin and Jerry Morrow won the match when Morrow pinned Anthony with a splash off the top rope. The following bout saw Makhan Singh pin The Gothic Knight in a standard match.

The third contest had Rhonda Singh against KC Houston in a standard match. Singh won the match when she blocked a sunset flip by Houston and pinned her opponent with a sit-down splash. The next match was between Dan Kroffat and Jesse Helton. This was Kroffat's first in-ring appearance since his retirement in 1985. The two wrestled for around two minutes before Dr. Drago Zhivago came down to ringside and began harassing Kroffat. Kroffat responded by challenging Zhivago to enter the ring. Accepting the challenge, the then 50-year-old wrestler put Zhivago in a sleeper hold and stripped him of his pants. The bout was eventually declared a no-contest.

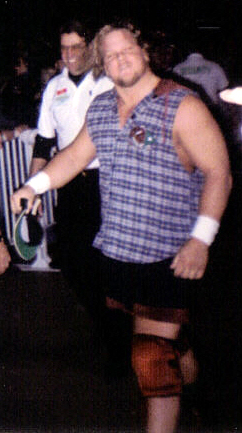
Rad Radford represented the WWF against Chris Benoit.

After the fourth match ended, Chris Benoit and Rad Radford made their way to the ring for a special "World Championship Wrestling vs. World Wrestling Federation" bout. Benoit, representing WCW, was originally scheduled to face The 1-2-3 Kid. Benoit and Radford shook hands out of respect before the match started. The two wrestled for over ten minutes. Benoit caught Radford as he climbed to the wrestling ring's top turnbuckle and executed a top rope superplex to pin his opponent. The next match was between Keith Hart and The 1-2-3 Kid. Hart controlled the first few minutes of the match before being thrown out of the ring. The 1-2-3 Kid then performed a pescado, a slingshot crossbody where the wrestler goes from the inside of the ring over the top ring rope to the outside, on Hart. This resulted in both men to crashing into the announcer's table. Returning to the ring, The 1-2-3 Kid attempted a frog splash from the top rope but Hart was able to put his knees up in time. This allowed Hart not only to block the maneuver but also cause The 1-2-3 Kid to injure his leg in the process. Sensing victory, Hart targeted his opponent's knee for the remainder of the match. As Hart attempted to put The 1-2-3 Kid in a figure-four leglock, however, The 1-2-3 Kid turned the tables by trapping Hart with an inside cradle. Afterwards, Hart thanked the fans in attendance and wished his father, Stu Hart, a happy 80th birthday.

=== Main event matches ===
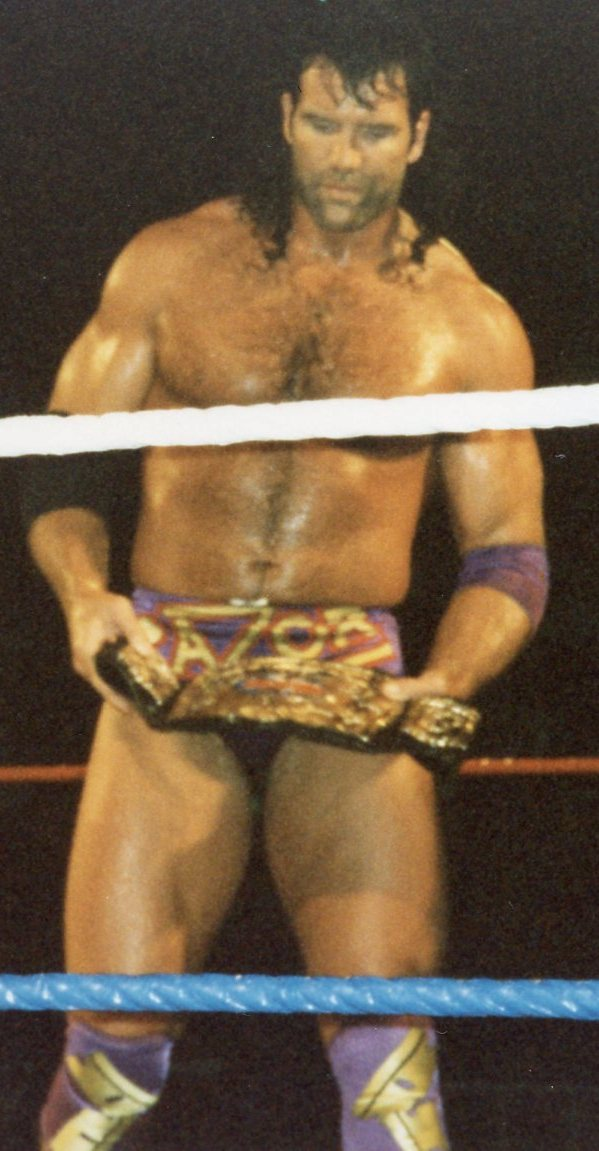
Razor Ramon as WWF Intercontinental Champion.

The next match was for the WWF Intercontinental Championship, in which champion Razor Ramon defended the title against Owen Hart. The start of the match saw Ramon perform a fallaway slam and follow up by clotheslining Hart over the top rope. Hart gained control of the match after top rope missile dropkick. The top turnbuckle snapped off in mid-match after Ramon was whipped into the corner. This caused one of the ring rope's to fall off which Hart used to choke Ramon. The two men brawled on the outside before returning to the ring. Ramon managed to put Hart a backdrop suplex off the second rope, and was preparing to put Hart in the Razor's Edge, when The 1-2-3 Kid came down to ringside to interfere on Hart's behalf. The 1-2-3 Kid tried to dive onto Ramon from the top turnbuckle but the champion dodged his attack and sent The 1-2-3 Kid over the top rope with a clothesline. As the referee was dealing with The 1-2-3 Kid outside the ring, Hart used the house microphone to knock out Ramon and pin him. Although it appeared Hart had won the belt, a second official came to ringside and informed the referee what had happened. The match was restarted and Ramon went on to pin Hart with a small package.

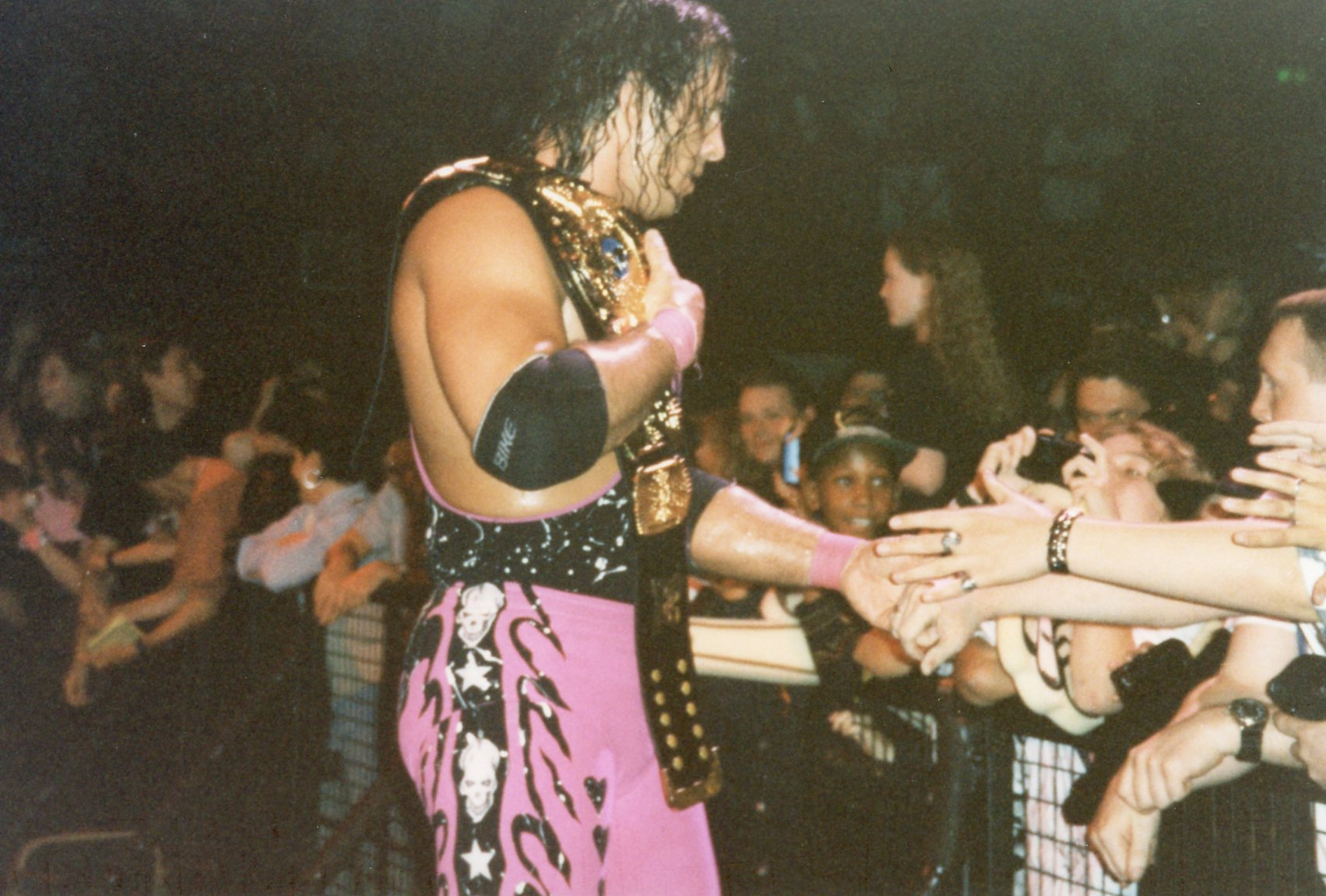
Bret Hart defended the WWF World Heavyweight Championship against brother-in-law Davey Boy Smith.

The eighth match of the night was a tag team match in which Bad Company (Bruce Hart and Brian Pillman) wrestled Dory Funk Jr. and Terry Funk accompanied by Makhan Singh. After a wild brawl, Bad Company were awarded the match via disqualification when Terry Funk hit Hart with a steel chair as he attempted to pin Dory. The last match of the night was the main event between Bret Hart and Davey Boy Smith for the WWF World Heavyweight Championship. Both men were driven to ringside on motorcycles. Bret gave his glasses away to his father Stu Hart who was sitting at ringside. The match concluded with Hart pinning Smith with a reverse roll-up seconds after Smith broke out of Hart's Sharpshooter finisher. It was the last time Hart would defend the title in his hometown.

== Results ==
No.	Results	Stipulations	Times
1^{D}	The Cuban Assassin and Jerry Morrow defeated King Lau and Mike Anthony	Tag team match	11:27
2^{D}	Makhan Singh defeated The Gothic Knight	Singles match	11:00
3^{D}	Rhonda Singh defeated KC Houston	Singles match	5:51
4^{D}	Dan Kroffat vs. Jesse Helton ended in a no contest	Singles match	2:30
5	Chris Benoit (WCW) defeated Rad Radford (WWF) by pinfall	"WCW vs. WWF" match	11:28
6	The 1-2-3 Kid defeated Keith Hart	Singles match	6:37
7	Razor Ramon (c) defeated Owen Hart	Singles match for the WWF Intercontinental Championship	16:10
8	Bad Company (Bruce Hart and Brian Pillman) defeated Dory Funk Jr. and Terry Funk (with Makhan Singh)	Tag team match	18:19
9	Bret Hart (c) defeated Davey Boy Smith	Singles match for the WWF World Heavyweight Championship	12:43
(c) / – the champion(s) heading into the match; D / – this was a dark match

== See also ==
- Professional wrestling in Canada
