= John Quinn (wrestler) =

Canadian professional wrestler (1941–2019)

Personal information
- Born: October 15, 1941 Hamilton, Ontario, Canada
- Died: April 22, 2019 (aged 77) Vancouver, British Columbia, Canada
- Family: Pat Quinn (cousin)

Professional wrestling career
- Ring name(s): The Butcher; Danny Dubois; John Clay; John Quinn; Mighty John Quinn; The Kentucky Butcher; Little John; Marcel LeMay; The Masked Spoiler; The Stomper; Virgil the Kentucky Butcher
- Billed height: 6 ft 5 in (1.96 m)
- Billed weight: 290 lb (130 kg)
- Billed from: Kentucky (as The Kentucky Butcher)
- Trained by: Al Spittles
- Debut: 1961
- Retired: 1988

John Arthur Quinn (October 15, 1941 – April 22, 2019) was a Canadian professional wrestler. In the United States, he was best known for his appearances in the World Wide Wrestling Federation (WWWF) under the ring name The Kentucky Butcher in the late-1960s, where he challenged then WWWF World Heavyweight Champion Bruno Sammartino on several occasions, including a 1968 main event at Madison Square Garden.

In addition to his appearances in the WWWF, Quinn performed under his birth name for North American regional promotions including NWA All-Star Wrestling, Pacific Northwest Wrestling and Stampede Wrestling from the early 1960s to early 1970s. During his later career, he also appeared in European and Japanese organizations from the 1970s until the late 1980s. A notorious "heel" in Great Britain during this time, he held the British World Heavyweight Championship three times between 1980 and 1986.

== Professional wrestling career ==
=== Early career (1961–1967) ===
A native of Hamilton, Ontario, Quinn was brought in as a sparring partner for Whipper Billy Watson's wrestling camp. Impressed by Quinn, he was invited by Watson to join his tour in Ontario during the summer. Later training under Al Spittles, he eventually made his debut in 1961 wrestling for promoter Larry Kasaboski in northern Ontario. For the next few years, he wrestled under numerous ring names as he toured Canada and the United States including Marcel LeMay, Danny Dubois, Jack Clay and The Masked Spoiler.

In early 1965, Quinn began wrestling in the World Wide Wrestling Federation as Virgil the Kentucky Butcher defeating Arnold Skaaland during a television taping at the National Arena in Washington, DC on January 18, 1965 as well as defeating Skaaland and Wes Hutchinson later that month.

Later that year, he returned to Ontario and teamed with Wes Hutchins as the Masked Yankees in Frank Tunney's Maple Leaf Wrestling. They soon climbed to the top of the tag team division defeating Emile Dupree & Paul DeMarco and Sweet Daddy Siki and Tony Parisi among others before suffering a disqualification loss to Whipper Billy Watson & "Lord" Athol Layton on December 26, 1965.

Winning the vacant NWA International Tag Team Championship on January 9, their eventual defeat by Billy Watson and Bulldog Brower in Toronto, Ontario on July 10 was one of the highest drawing matches of the year with 7,500 in attendance.

=== World Wide Wrestling Federation (1967–1969) ===
Returning to the WWWF full-time in December 1967, he defeated Arnold Skaaland and Angelo Savoldi and, the following year, he also defeated Mario Frateroli, Edouard Carpentier and feuded with Louis Cerdan during February and March. On March 11, he faced WWWF World Heavyweight Champion Bruno Sammartino at Madison Square Garden in New York City, New York being pinned by Sammartino after a backward flip press. The Garden win over Carpentier prior to facing Sammartino was possibly his biggest career win. Although Butcher was a "heel", the two men shook hands after the match.

Facing Gino Brito at the Providence Civic Center in Providence, Rhode Island on March 16, he also received a rematch against Bruno Sammartino at the Boston Garden in Boston, Massachusetts later that month. Teaming with Bill Miller and "Crazy" Luke Graham in a best 3-of-5 falls match against Dominic DeNucci, Victor Rivera and Earl Maynard in South Plainville, New Jersey on March 22, he also facing Dominic DeNucci in several single matches during the next several weeks.

In early-April, Quinn again faced Bruno Sammartino in several rematches and defeated the world champion by countout in Philadelphia, Pennsylvania on April 4. In the following weeks, Quinn came close to dethroning Sammartino fighting him to a time-limit draw in Washington, DC on April 15 and defeating Sammartino by countout at the Boston Garden five days later.

After defeating Tony Altimore at Moose Hall in Trenton, New Jersey on April 22, he took on The Sicilians (Lou Albano and Tony Altimore) in a handicap match at the Baltimore Civic Center in Baltimore, Maryland on April 24 before facing Bruno Sammartino in a Texas Death match in Philadelphia later that week.

Losing matches to Bobo Brazil and Earl Maynard in early May, he again lost to Bruno Sammartino in a Texas Death match at the Boston Garden on May 11 and teamed with Gorilla Monsoon several days later fighting to a time-limit draw against Bruno Sammartino and Victor Rivera in Philadelphia on May 18. Facing Earl Maynard and Louis Cerdan during the next week, he and Gorilla Monsoon again fought Sammartino and Rivera to a draw in Elizabeth, New Jersey on May 25. Defeating Sammartino and Edouard Carpentier in a tag team match at the Boston Garden with Monsoon on May 29, he and Monsoon lost to Sammartino and Rivera in a 2-3 falls match in Philadelphia on June 8.

Defeating Ricky Sexton in Lawrence, Massachusetts on June 10, he faced Crybaby" George Cannon and Victor Rivera whom he fought to a time limit draw at the National Arena on June 13. Later that night, he teamed with Bull Ramos and Hans Mortier to defeat Rivera, Earl Maynard and Arnold Skaaland.

Returning to the Boston Garden on June 15, he and Monsoon fought to a no-contest against Sammartino and Rivera and, later that week, teamed with Prof. Toru Tanaka against Victor Rivera & Edouard Carpentier in Bangor, Maine on June 19. Defeating Lennie Solomon and George Cannon later that month, he once again faced Bruno Sammartino losing to him in Baltimore on June 26.

Teaming with Bull Ramos, he also lost to Victor Rivera & Earl Maynard in Hershey, Pennsylvania on June 28 as well a 6-man tag team match with Gorilla Monsoon and Prof. Toru Tanaka against Eduard Carpentier, Victor Rivera and Bruno Sammartino in a 3-of-5 falls match at the Boston Garden on July 6. Defeating Johnny Rodz on July 11, he also faced Eduard Carpentier, Victor Rivera, Bull Ramos, Hans Mortier later that month.

On August 15, with Bull Ramos and George "the Animal" Steele, he lost to Earl Maynard, Victor Rivera and Bruno Sammartino at the National Arena. During the next two days, he lost back-to-back matches against Sammartino in Asbury Park, New Jersey and Bobo Brazil at Madison Square Garden on August 17. He and Gorilla Monsoon also lost to Bruno Sammartino and Victor Rivera on August 27.

While in Pittsburgh on September 13, Quinn defeated The Battman when the match was stopped by referee's decision due to injury. Following this, Quinn's feud with Bruno Sammartino was resumed as he and Bull Ramos faced the Battman and Bruno Sammartino in several tag team matches throughout September. Later that month, in a 6-man tag team match with Baron Mikel Scicluna and Joe Thomas, Quinn lost to Sammartino, Victor Rivera and Art Thomas on September 28.

After yet another failed attempt to defeat Sammartino on October 3, he and Bull Ramos fought Bruno Sammartino and Batman to a time limit draw the following night in Wheeling, West Virginia. Teaming with Baron Mikel Scicluna and Gorilla Monsoon against Haystacks Calhoun & Victor Rivera in early October, he also lost to the Battman via disqualification on October 18. He and Bull Ramos also lost to Bobo Brazil and Ernie Lassiter at Madison Square Garden on October 21 and, the following month, he and Chuck Adcock lost to The Sicilians on November 11.

Although he and Gorilla Monsoon defeated WWWF World Champion Bruno Sammartino & Battman in Pittsburgh on November 15, he lost in a 6-man tag team match with Gorilla Monsoon and Baron Mikel Scicluna to Haystacks Calhoun, Spiros Arion and Victor Rivera at Madison Square Garden on November 18. He scored several singles victories over Frank Durso, Frank Holtz and Pete Sanchez before losing to Bruno Sammartino in a best 2 of 3 falls match at Monessen High School in Rostraver, Pennsylvania on November 22.

On November 26, he and Baron Mikel Scicluna faced The Sicilians (Lou Albano & Tony Altimore) at the Expo Building in Portland, Maine. Losing to Spiros Arion in Trenton on December 2, he also faced Joe Adcock, Haystack Calhoun and Victor Rivera later that year before his final WWWF appearance losing to Bruno Sammartino at a television taping in Philadelphia on January 11, 1969.

=== World Class Championship Wrestling (1969) ===
Moving on to World Class Championship Wrestling, Quinn continued wrestling as the Kentucky Butcher defeating Danny Plechas in Fort Worth, Texas on January 13. Defeating Alex Medina in Dallas, Texas the following night, he and Krusher Kowalski lost in a tag team match against Dr. Dan Miller and Fred Curry on January 20. Losing to Grizzly Smith by disqualification the next day, he and Tank Morgan lost to Grizzly Smith & Waldo Von Erich on January 27. In February, he also lost matches to Joe Blanchard, Dr. Dan Miller and Jose Lothario before wrestling his last match against Waldo Von Erich on February 18.

=== Georgia Championship Wrestling (1969) ===
Two days later, under the name Little John, made his debut in Georgia Championship Wrestling defeating Seiji Sakaguchi at the Atlanta Municipal Auditorium in Atlanta, Georgia. Feuding with The Assassins (Assassin #1 & Assassin #2), he teamed with Bill Dromo, Louie Tillet and Buddy Fuller during the next month. On April 4, Quinn was allowed to enter a one-night championship tournament for the held-up NWA Georgia Tag Team Championship with a mystery partner later revealed as Grizzly Smith. Teaming with Smith as The Kentuckyians, they defeated Dale Lewis and Eduardo Perez in the opening rounds before being eliminated by The Assassins in the semi-finals.

On April 11, they teamed with The Professional to defeat The Spoiler & The Assassins in a 6-man tag team match with Bill Longson as special referee. As part of the pre-match stipulation, The Spoiler was forced to unmask following the match and was identified as Mike Davis.

Defeating Dale Lewis and Skandor Akbar and Los Toros (Cisco Grimaldo & Roberto Pico) during the next several weeks, he also faced Joe Turco and Assassin #2 in single matches. Although he and Smith defeated The Assassins on May 2, they were unable to defeat them in a title match the following week. Fighting to a lime limit draw against The Professional & The Spoiler on May 16, The Kentuckyians again lost to The Assassins on May 23, however, they defeated Tony Nero & Tom Bradley and Mitsu & Sugi Sito later that month.

On June 3, after defeating Tony Nero in a singles match at the Macon Coliseum in Macon, Georgia, he and Smith defeated Tony Nero & The Professional at the same event. Three days later however, he and Smith lost to Tom Bradley & the Assassins in a 6-man tag team match with Leo Garibaldi.

Teaming with Corsica Jean, Bill Dromo and Tim Geohagen during the next few weeks, he also briefly feuded with Skandor Akbar in late-June. Teaming with Bill Dromo, Johnny Walker and Bob Armstrong against Chati Yokuchi and Mr. Ito during the next month, he and Dromo managed to defeat The Assassins by disqualification on July 17.

The following night, he and Smith lost to The Super Assassins. Feuding with The Super Assassins (Super Assassin #1 & Super Assassin #2) and their manager Super Manager during the next two months, although twice defeating them by disqualification in late-July, they lost to them several times during the next few weeks. After losing to The Super Assassins on August 15, Quinn left the area.

=== National Wrestling Alliance affiliates (1970–1977) ===
By early 1970, after a stint as The Butcher for promoter Ed Farhat in Detroit, he eventually ended up in Vancouver's NWA All-Star Wrestling, where then-promoter Gene Kiniski billed him under his real name as "Mighty" John Quinn. Teaming with "Bulldog" Bob Brown, he defeated Dean Higuchi & Steve Bolus to win the NWA Canadian Tag Team Championship on February 9, 1970. Losing the title to Don Leo Jonathan & Duncan McTavish on September 7, Quinn would team with Dutch Savage to regain the title, defeating Don Leo Jonathan & Steven Little Bear on February 15, 1971. He and Savage would lose the title a month later to Dean Higuchi & Steven Little Bear on March 15.

In May, he made his Toronto debut with Maple Leaf Wrestling teaming with Skull Brother #1 against Whipper Billy Watson & Haystacks Calhoun on May 2. Defeating Lou Klein the following night, he and Man Mountain Cannon would lose to Bobo Brazil & Dewey Robertson at the Varsity Stadium on June 6. Teaming with Mike Loren, he would also lose to Bobo Brazil & Luis Martinez on June 20 although he would score victories over Man Mountain Cannon, Lou Klein and Dewey Robertson before fighting to a double disqualification with The Sheik on August 29. He would leave the area after losing a Death Match to The Sheik on September 5. Leaving for Stampede Wrestling, he defeated Black Angus Campbell for the Stampede North American Heavyweight Championship in October before losing the title back to Campbell in Edmonton, Alberta on November 6, 1971.

In early 1972, Quinn toured NWA Tri-State as The Stomper and won the NWA Mid-South Brass Knuckles and North American Heavyweight titles from Bill Watts in March. Within several weeks, he had lost the Brass Knuckles title to Bob Sweetan in June and the North American title back to Watts in the following month.

Returning to Vancouver, Quinn teamed with Bob Brown once again to challenge his former tag team partner Dutch Savage & Steven Little Bear for the NWA Canadian Tag Team Championship, later defeating them in New Westminster, British Columbia on August 7, 1972. Feuding with Savage & Little Bear over the tag team titles, they would trade the tag team belts twice with their rivals before finally losing the championship to them on January 22, 1973.

Several months later, he would team with Gerry Romano to defeat The Brute & Mike Webster on July 16 and held the titles for a little more than a month before losing the titles to The Brute & Gene Kiniski on August 20. Later that year while in Superstar Championship Wrestling, he and Paddy Ryan would defeat Ray Steele & Luke Brown for the SCW Western States Tag Team Championship in Seattle, Washington on November 20, 1973. The following year, he was awarded the SCW Western States Heavyweight Championship when former champion Bob Mongol left the promotion in January 1974. He would eventually lose the title to Eddie Sullivan in Yakima, Washington on March 6 as well as the tag team titles to Sullivan & Luke Brown in Richland, Washington on March 22, 1974.

He later reappeared in Stampede Wrestling to defeat Danny Little Bear to regain the Stampede North American Heavyweight Championship on September 13. Feuding with Les Thornton over the title during the next several months, he would trade the title with Thornton in December 1974 before finally losing the title to Larry Lane the following year. As part of Big Bad John's controversial stable with King Curtis and Mr. Hito, he would become involved in a lengthy feud with "Cowboy" Dan Kroffat, Larry Lane and Mark Lewin after he and members of Big Bad John's "army" handcuffed promoter Stu Hart to the ring ropes and attacked him at an event in Calgary. He would also briefly hold the Stampede International Tag Team Title with Mr. Hito defeating Les Thornton & Frankie Laine for the titles on May 2, 1975 before the titles were vacated later that year.

During 1976, he and Kinji Shibuya defeated Don Leo Jonathan & "Superfly" Jimmy Snuka on May 20 and also faced Terry Funk in a match for the NWA World Heavyweight Championship in Vancouver on July 19. Defeating John Tolos for the NWA Pacific Coast Heavyweight Championship on August 9, Quinn and Shibuya would hold the NWA Canadian Tag Team title for five months before losing them to Jonathan & John Anson on October 28. He would also lose the NWA Pacific Coast title to Don Leo Jonathan on December 13, 1976.

During the next two years, he and Don Leo Jonathan would feud over the titles with Quinn winning the Canadian Tag Team title once more with Kurt Von Hess before losing the title to Don Leo Jonathan & Dutch Savage on January 17, 1977.

=== International Wrestling Enterprise (1977) ===
In 1977, Quinn began competing for the International Wrestling Enterprise promotion in Japan. He and Kurt Von Hess entered an 8-team championship tournament for the IWE Tag Team titles. Defeating Rusher Kimura & Shiyouzu Ooiyama in the opening rounds and Ryuma Go & Thunder Sugiyama in the semi-finals, he and Von Hess would defeat Animal Hamigachi & Isamu Teranishi in the finals to win the IWE Tag Team Championship in Yokohama, Japan on March 25, 1977. The following night, he and Kurt Von Hess lost the titles to Animal Hamigachi & Isamu Teranishi in a 2-3 falls match at Sumo Hall in Tokyo, Japan. During the match, although Von Hess took the first fall pinning Animal Hamiguchi, he and Von Hess were disqualified forfeiting a fall to their opponents and Hamiguchi pinned Von Hess for the third pinfall.

=== Great Britain and later career (1977–1988) ===
In late 1977, Quinn faced NWA World Heavyweight Champion Harley Race in Calgary, Alberta on July 8, 1977.

Returning to Vancouver, he briefly regained the NWA Pacific Coast Heavyweight Championship before losing the title to Gene Kiniski on May 15. He would also have one last run with longtime rival Don Leo Jonathan as NWA Canadian Tag Team Champions in early 1978, Quinn began competing internationally with the Catch Wrestling Association where he competed in "World Cup" tournaments in Hanover, Germany and Vienna, Austria. He would also gain particular notoriety in Great Britain while appearing on ITV's World of Sport making anti-British statements towards audiences and often referred to Britons as "cowardly". Issuing open challenges to British heavyweights, his match against Big Daddy proved especially popular as an estimated 10,000 were in attendance at the sold-out Wembley Arena in 1979. Quinn lasted 1 minute and 42 seconds before he was knocked out.

In what was considered a major upset, Quinn would later go on to win the British version of the World Heavyweight Championship defeating Wayne Bridges in London, England on April 21, 1980. Although his victory was intended to set up a feud with Bridges over the title, Quinn jumped to the rival All Star Wrestling while still champion, although Bridges was later awarded a splinter version of the title after defeating Big Jim Harris at Wembley Arena in 1981.

Quinn defeated numerous British wrestlers including World Heavy Middleweight Champion Mark Rocco, British Mid-heavyweight Champion Chic Cullen and World Lightweight Champion Johnny Saint. One title defence against Giant Haystacks in Claremorris, County Mayo, Ireland during this period was publicised with a contract signing ceremony on RTÉ television show Davis at Large. He would eventually lose the World heavyweight title to Tony St. Clair in Hanley, England on May 8, 1982.

When Wayne Bridges also left for All Star Wrestling in 1983, he and Quinn would resume their feud over the British World Heavyweight title which would also involve Tony St. Clair whom Quinn eventually defeated for the title in Slough, England on February 13, 1984. Also, in 1984, John Quinn competed in Puerto Rico for the World Wrestling Council In 1984, Quinn competed in the 1984 IWGP League finishing with 10 points.

The following month, Quinn would also tour Japan taking part in several interpromotional matches with All Japan Pro Wrestling and the World Wrestling Federation with he and Otto Wanz fighting Yoshiaki Yatsu & Animal Hamaguchi to a double count-out in Fukuoka, Japan on May 11. Losing to Tatsumi Fujinami, Seiji Sakaguchi and André the Giant during the next several days, he would defeat Yoshiaki Fujiwara in Kumamoto, Japan on May 15 and, the following night in Saga, he and "Big" John Studd defeated Yoshiaki Yatsu & Isamu Teranishi. He would also team with WWF World Heavyweight Champion Hulk Hogan and The Masked Superstar in a 6-man tag team match losing to Tatsumi Fujinami, Seigi Sakaguchi and Antonio Inoki in Nagasaki, Japan on May 17.

After defeating Kuniaki Kobayashi in Hiroshima, Japan on the last night of the tour, Quinn returned to Great Britain to resume his feud with Bridges and St. Clair. During the next two years, Quinn would win the British World Heavyweight Championship back from St. Clair before losing the title to Bridges in 1985. When Bridges vacated the title, Quinn won it for a third and final time in a four-man tournament in Hanley in early 1986, defeating St.Clair in the final, before losing it to Bridges on September 9, 1986.

Quinn was working for All Star Wrestling in Britain when it was televised on Screensport in 1985-1986 and again when the promotion gained a slice of ITV coverage in 1987 and he returned to TV appearing on both shows. His 1986 World title tournament final win over StClair was broadcast, along with both semifinals, on the Screensport show and on ITV he fought Bridges once again and teamed with legendary masked wrestler Kendo Nagasaki. He also appeared on Welsh language channel S4C's Reslo wrestling show organised by veteran Welsh promoter Orig Williams, throughout the period 1982-1988.

However, due in part to business disagreements with British promoters, as well as the upcoming loss of the ITV show in December 1988, Quinn returned to British Columbia in 1988 where he rejoined the similarly-named NWA All Star Wrestling for a time although he would leave the promotion over a pay dispute with promoter Al Tomko and retired shortly after wrestling his final match against Danny Biback in Cloverdale, British Columbia.

=== Retirement ===
In the years after his retirement, Quinn worked in a variety of jobs ranging from a labourer, taxi driver, and truck driver to hotel and restaurant ownership. At one point, Quinn was in ill health however he would eventually recover.

Remaining uninvolved in professional wrestling for almost 20 years, Quinn made an appearance at Twister's Gym at the Abbotsford Agri-fair hosted by Top Ranked Wrestling in July 2005. During the event, a tribute show was held in Quinn's honor and he was presented a plaque by the organizers.

== Personal life ==
Quinn was the cousin of Pat Quinn, former head coach of the Toronto Maple Leafs. Quinn died in Vancouver at the age of 77 due to complications from a stroke after a surgery on April 22, 2019.

== Championships and accomplishments ==
- International Wrestling Enterprise
  - IWA World Tag Team Championship (1 time) - with Kurt Von Hess
- Joint Promotions/All Star Wrestling
  - World Heavyweight Championship (3 times)
- NWA All Star Wrestling
  - NWA Canadian Tag Team Championship (9 times) - with Bob Brown (4 times), Dutch Savage (1 time), Gerry Romano (1 time), Kinji Shibuya (1 time), Kurt Von Hess (1 time) and Don Leo Jonathan (1 time)
  - NWA Pacific Coast Heavyweight Championship (2 times)
- NWA Tri-State
  - NWA Brass Knuckles Championship (1 times)
  - NWA Mid-South North American Championship (1 times)
- Pro Wrestling Illustrated
  - PWI ranked him # 192 of the 400 best singles wrestlers of the PWI's WWE Top 400 in 2003
- Stampede Wrestling
  - Stampede International Tag Team Championship (1 time) - with Mr. Hito
  - Stampede North American Heavyweight Championship (3 times)
- Superstar Championship Wrestling
  - SCW Western States Championship (1 time)
  - SCW Western States Tag Team Championship (1 time) - with Paddy Ryan
