= Stampede Wrestling North American Heavyweight Championship =

Professional wrestling championship

- The original championship belt

Details
- Promotion: Stampede Wrestling
- Date established: February 28, 1968
- Date retired: 1989 & 2008
Statistics
- First champion: Archie Gouldie
- Final champion: Randy Myers
- Most reigns: Archie Gouldie (14)
- Longest reign: Davey Boy Smith (521 days)
- Shortest reign: Stan Stasiak and Geoff Portz (1 day)

The Stampede Wrestling North American Heavyweight Championship was the major title in the Canadian professional wrestling promotion Stampede Wrestling. From its establishment in 1968 until 1972, it was Stampede's secondary singles championship, becoming the top title in 1972 after the previous top championship, the Calgary version of the NWA Canadian Heavyweight Championship (Calgary version), was abandoned.

== Title history ==
Key
| No. | Overall reign number |
| Reign | Reign number for the specific champion |
| Days | Number of days held |

| No. | Champion | Championship change | | | Reign statistics | | Notes | Ref. |
| No. | Champion | Date | Event | Location | Reign | Days | Notes | Ref. |
|---|---|---|---|---|---|---|---|---|
Stampede North American Heavyweight Championship (1968-1989)
| 1 | Archie Gouldie | February 28, 1968 | Stampede show | Saskatoon, SK | 1 | 9 | Defeated Pat O'Connor to become the first champion | |
| 2 | Ox Baker | March 8, 1968 | Stampede show | Calgary, AB | 1 | 7 | | |
| 3 | Waldo Von Erich | March 15, 1968 | Stampede show | Calgary, AB | 1 | 80 | | |
| 4 | Archie Gouldie | June 3, 1968 | Stampede show | N/A | 2 | 105 | | |
| 5 | Stan Stasiak | September 16, 1968 | Stampede show | Lethbridge, AB | 1 | 1 | | |
| 6 | Archie Gouldie | September 17, 1968 | Stampede show | Edmonton, AB | 3 | 7 | | |
| 7 | Vic Rossitani | September 24, 1968 | Stampede show | Edmonton, AB | 1 | 6 | | |
| 8 | Bob Sweetan | September 30, 1968 | Stampede show | N/A | 1 | 1 | | |
| 9 | Vic Rossitani | October 1, 1968 | Stampede show | Edmonton, AB | 2 | 10 | | |
| 10 | Stan Stasiak | October 11, 1968 | Stampede show | Calgary, AB | 2 | 6 | | |
| 11 | Vic Rossitani | October 17, 1968 | Stampede show | Regina, SK | 3 | 1 | | |
| 12 | Stan Stasiak | October 18, 1968 | Stampede show | N/A | 3 | 60 | | |
| 13 | Archie Gouldie | December 17, 1968 | Stampede show | Edmonton, AB | 4 | 92 | | |
| 14 | Angelo Mosca | March 19, 1969 | Stampede show | N/A | 1 | 21 | | |
| 15 | Archie Gouldie | April 9, 1969 | Stampede show | Regina, SK | 5 | 13 | | |
| 16 | Angelo Mosca | April 22, 1969 | Stampede show | Calgary, AB | 2 | N/A | | |
| — | Vacated | May 3, 1969 | Stampede show | Calgary, AB | — | — | Title held up between Angelo Mosca and Archie Gouldie. | |
| 17 | Archie Gouldie | May 6, 1969 | Stampede show | Calgary, AB | 6 | 51 | Defeated Angelo Mosca in a rematch to win the held up title. | |
| 18 | Billy Robinson | June 26, 1969 | Stampede show | Calgary, AB | 1 | 225 | Awarded when Gouldie did not show up for a championship match | |
| 19 | Abdullah the Butcher | February 6, 1970 | Stampede show | Calgary, AB | 1 | 14 | | |
| 20 | Billy Robinson | February 20, 1970 | Stampede show | Calgary, AB | 2 | 7 | | |
| 21 | Abdullah the Butcher | February 27, 1970 | Stampede show | Calgary, AB | 2 | 49 | | |
| 22 | Jerry Christy | April 17, 1970 | Stampede show | Calgary, AB | 1 | 14 | | |
| 23 | Abdullah the Butcher | May 1, 1970 | Stampede show | Calgary, AB | 3 | 6 | | |
| 24 | Jerry Christy | May 7, 1970 | Stampede show | Calgary, AB | 2 | 7 | | |
| 25 | Abdullah the Butcher | May 14, 1970 | Stampede show | Calgary, AB | 4 | 92 | | |
| 26 | Dave Ruhl | August 14, 1970 | Stampede show | Calgary, AB | 2 | 42 | | |
| 27 | Sweet Daddy Siki | September 25, 1970 | Stampede show | Calgary, AB | 1 | 168 | | |
| 28 | Abdullah the Butcher | March 12, 1971 | Stampede show | N/A | 5 | 6 | | |
| 29 | Les Thornton | March 18, 1971 | Stampede show | Saskatoon, SK | 1 | N/A | | |
| — | Vacated | August 25, 1971 | Stampede show | — | — | — | After a match between Les Thornton and Black Angus Campbell. | |
| 30 | Black Angus Campbell | August 28, 1971 | Stampede show | Edmonton, AB | 1 | N/A | Defeated Thornton in rematch. | |
| 31 | John Quinn | October 1971 | Stampede show | N/A | 1 | N/A | | |
| 32 | Black Angus Campbell | November 6, 1971 | Stampede show | Edmonton, AB | 2 | 13 | | |
| 33 | Bob Lueck | November 19, 1971 | Stampede show | N/A | 1 | 14 | | |
| 34 | Kurt Von Hess | December 3, 1971 | Stampede show | Calgary, AB | 1 | 73 | | |
| 35 | Tor Kamata | February 14, 1972 | Stampede show | Lethbridge, AB | 1 | 109 | | |
| 36 | Geoff Portz | June 2, 1972 | Stampede show | Calgary, AB | 1 | 21 | | |
| 37 | Tor Kamata | June 23, 1972 | Stampede show | Calgary, AB | 2 | 26 | | |
| 38 | Dan Kroffat | July 19, 1972 | Stampede show | Saskatoon, SK | 1 | 16 | | |
| 39 | Tor Kamata | August 4, 1972 | Stampede show | Calgary, AB | 3 | 20 | | |
| 40 | Geoff Portz | August 24, 1972 | Stampede show | N/A | 2 | 5 | | |
| 41 | Tor Kamata | August 29, 1972 | Stampede show | N/A | 4 | 4 | | |
| 42 | Geoff Portz | September 2, 1972 | Stampede show | Calgary, AB | 3 | 21 | | |
| 43 | Kendo Nagasaki | September 23, 1972 | Stampede show | Calgary, AB | 1 | 91 | This was the original British masked version of the character, not the face-painted Japan/US version (although he would also later hold the title as Mr Sakurada in 1978) | |
| 44 | Geoff Portz | December 23, 1972 | N/A | Calgary, AB | 4 | 20 | | |
| 45 | Abdullah the Butcher | January 12, 1973 | Stampede show | Calgary, AB | 6 | 99 | | |
| 46 | Archie Gouldie | April 21, 1973 | Stampede show | Calgary, AB | 8 | 67 | | |
| 47 | Dan Kroffat | June 27, 1973 | Stampede show | Saskatoon, SK | 2 | 7 | | |
| 48 | Archie Gouldie | July 4, 1973 | Stampede show | Calgary, AB | 9 | 42 | | |
| 49 | Dan Kroffat | August 15, 1973 | Stampede show | Regina, SK | 3 | 12 | | |
| 50 | Gil Hayes | August 27, 1973 | Stampede show | Lethbridge, AB | 1 | 74 | | |
| 51 | Omar Atlas | November 9, 1973 | Stampede show | Edmonton, AB | 1 | 49 | | |
| 52 | Archie Gouldie | December 28, 1973 | Stampede show | Calgary, AB | 10 | 46 | | |
| 53 | Larry Lane | February 12, 1974 | Stampede show | Prince Albert, SK | 1 | 2 | | |
| 54 | Archie Gouldie | February 14, 1974 | Stampede show | Calgary, AB | 11 | 8 | | |
| 55 | Harley Race | February 22, 1974 | Stampede show | Calgary, AB | 1 | 14 | | |
| 56 | Archie Gouldie | March 8, 1974 | Stampede show | Calgary, AB | 12 | 35 | | |
| 57 | Danny Little Bear | April 12, 1974 | Stampede show | N/A | 1 | 101 | | |
| 58 | John Quinn | July 22, 1974 | Stampede show | Calgary, AB | 2 | 137 | | |
| 59 | Les Thornton | December 6, 1974 | Stampede show | Calgary, AB | 2 | 14 | | |
| 60 | Larry Lane | December 20, 1974 | Stampede show | Calgary, AB | 2 | 49 | | |
| 61 | King Curtis Iaukea | February 7, 1975 | Stampede show | Calgary, AB | 1 | 181 | | |
| 62 | Larry Lane | August 7, 1975 | Stampede show | Regina, SK | 3 | 53 | | |
| — | Vacated | September 29, 1975 | — | — | — | — | Lane was injured. | |
| 64 | Frankie Laine | December 12, 1975 | Stampede show | Calgary, AB | 1 | 35 | Defeated Butcher Brannigan to win the vacant title. | |
| 65 | Gilles Poisson | January 16, 1976 | Stampede show | Calgary, AB | 1 | 8 | | |
| 66 | Frankie Laine | January 24, 1976 | Stampede show | Edmonton, AB | 2 | 13 | | |
| 67 | Karl Von Schotz | February 6, 1976 | Stampede show | Calgary, AB | 1 | N/A | | |
| 68 | Eddie Morrow | April 6, 1976 | Stampede show | N/A | 1 | N/A | | |
| 69 | Karl Von Schotz | May 6, 1976 | Stampede show | N/A | 2 | N/A | | |
| 70 | Archie Gouldie | July 2, 1976 | Stampede show | Calgary, AB | 13 | 71 | | |
| 71 | Dan Kroffat | September 11, 1976 | Stampede show | Edmonton, AB | 4 | 48 | | |
| 72 | Larry Lane | October 29, 1976 | Stampede show | Edmonton, AB | 4 | 139 | | |
| 73 | "Killer" Tim Brooks | March 17, 1977 | Stampede show | N/A | 1 | 127 | | |
| 74 | Dan Kroffat | July 22, 1977 | Stampede show | Calgary, AB | 5 | 42 | | |
| — | Vacated | September 2, 1977 | — | — | — | — | Kroffat retired | |
| 75 | Don Gagné | October 7, 1977 | Stampede show | Calgary, AB | 1 | 91 | Defeated Bobby Burke in a tournament final to win the vacant title. | |
| 76 | Leo Burke | January 6, 1978 | Stampede show | Edmonton, AB | 1 | 65 | | |
| 77 | Michel Martel | March 12, 1978 | Stampede show | Edmonton, AB | 1 | 12 | | |
| 78 | Leo Burke | March 24, 1978 | Stampede show | Calgary, AB | 2 | 15 | | |
| 79 | Michel Martel | April 8, 1978 | Stampede show | N/A | 2 | 6 | | |
| 80 | Leo Burke | April 14, 1978 | Stampede show | Calgary, AB | 3 | 36 | | |
| 81 | Mr. Sakurada | May 20, 1978 | Stampede show | Edmonton, AB | 1 | 104 | | |
| 82 | Paddy Ryan | September 1, 1978 | Stampede show | Calgary, AB | 1 | 21 | | |
| 83 | Kasavubu | September 22, 1978 | Stampede show | Calgary, AB | 1 | 51 | | |
| 84 | Alo Leilani | November 12, 1978 | Stampede show | Edmonton, AB | 1 | 19 | | |
| 85 | Big Daddy Ritter | December 1, 1978 | Stampede show | Calgary, AB | 1 | 126 | | |
| 86 | Jake Roberts | April 6, 1979 | Stampede show | Calgary, AB | 1 | 112 | | |
| 87 | Big Daddy Ritter | July 27, 1979 | Stampede show | Calgary, AB | 2 | 15 | | |
| 88 | Larry Lane | August 11, 1979 | Stampede show | Edmonton, AB | 5 | N/A | | |
| 89 | Leo Burke | September 1979 | Stampede show | N/A | 4 | N/A | | |
| 90 | Don Gagné | November 18, 1979 | Stampede show | N/A | 2 | 20 | | |
| 91 | Mr. Sekigawa | December 8, 1979 | Stampede show | Edmonton, AB | 1 | N/A | | |
| 92 | Leo Burke | January 1980 | Stampede show | N/A | 5 | N/A | | |
| 93 | Bret Hart | May 2, 1980 | Stampede show | Calgary, AB | 1 | 65 | | |
| 94 | Duke Myers | July 6, 1980 | Stampede show | N/A | 1 | 5 | | |
| 95 | Bret Hart | July 11, 1980 | Stampede show | N/A | 2 | 204 | | |
| 96 | David Schultz | January 31, 1981 | Stampede show | Edmonton, AB | 1 | 21 | | |
| 97 | Leo Burke | February 21, 1981 | Stampede show | Calgary, AB | 6 | 6 | | |
| 98 | David Schultz | February 27, 1981 | Stampede show | Calgary, AB | 2 | 203 | | |
| 99 | Mr. Hito | September 18, 1981 | Stampede show | Calgary, AB | 1 | 14 | | |
| 100 | David Schultz | October 2, 1981 | Stampede show | Calgary, AB | 3 | 35 | | |
| 101 | Mr. Hito | November 6, 1981 | Stampede show | Calgary, AB | 2 | 133 | | |
| — | Vacated | March 19, 1982 | — | — | — | — | Hito was injured | |
| 102 | Leo Burke | March 21, 1982 | Stampede show | Calgary, AB | 7 | 97 | Defeated Duke Myers in a tournament final to win the vacant title | |
| 103 | Bret Hart | June 26, 1982 | Stampede show | Edmonton, AB | 3 | 69 | | |
| 104 | Bad News Allen | September 3, 1982 | Stampede show | Calgary, AB | 1 | 44 | | |
| 105 | Bret Hart | October 17, 1982 | Stampede show | Calgary, AB | 4 | 89 | | |
| 106 | Leo Burke | January 14, 1983 | Stampede show | Calgary, AB | 8 | 109 | | |
| 107 | Bret Hart | May 3, 1983 | Stampede show | Regina, SK | 5 | 74 | | |
| 108 | Bad News Allen | July 16, 1983 | Stampede show | Edmonton, AB | 2 | 160 | | |
| 109 | Archie Gouldie | December 23, 1983 | Stampede show | Calgary, AB | 14 | 28 | | |
| — | Vacated | January 20, 1984 | Stampede show | N/A | — | — | Title is held up by referee Cedric Hathaway after a No Disqualification title but between Gouldie and Killer Khan is stopped due to a bad cut near Gouldie's eye; a rematch is signed for the following week | |
| 111 | Killer Khan | January 27, 1984 | Stampede show | Calgary, AB | 1 | 42 | | |
| 112 | Dynamite Kid | March 9, 1984 | Stampede show | Calgary, AB | 1 | 21 | | |
| 113 | Bad News Allen | March 30, 1984 | Stampede show | Calgary, AB | 3 | 80 | Dynamite Kid Defeated Allen on April 23, 1984 in Vancouver, BC, however, this was later overturned. | |
| 114 | Davey Boy Smith | June 18, 1984 | Stampede show | Vancouver, BC | 1 | 521 | | |
| 115 | Kerry Brown | November 21, 1985 | Stampede show | Edmonton, AB | 1 | 120 | | |
| 116 | Ron Ritchie | March 21, 1986 | Stampede show | Vancouver, BC | 1 | 0 | | |
| — | Vacated | March 21, 1986 | Stampede show | Calgary, AB | — | — | Title held up between Kerry Brown and Ron Ritchie. | |
| 117 | Ron Ritchie | March 22, 1986 | Stampede show | Edmonton, AB | 2 | 44 | Defeated Kerry Brown in a rematch to win the held up title. | |
| 118 | Steve DiSalvo | May 5, 1986 | Stampede show | Vancouver, BC | 1 | 7 | | |
| 119 | Bad News Allen | May 12, 1986 | Stampede show | Swift Current, SK | 4 | 39 | | |
| 120 | Honky Tonk Wayne | June 20, 1986 | Stampede show | Calgary, AB | 1 | 70 | | |
| — | Vacated | August 29, 1986 | — | — | — | — | Farris leaves for the World Wrestling Federation | |
| 121 | Makhan Singh | October 31, 1986 | Stampede show | Calgary, AB | 1 | 80 | Defeated Owen Hart in a tournament final to win the vacant title | |
| 122 | Owen Hart | January 19, 1987 | Stampede show | Medicine Hat, AB | 1 | 11 | | |
| 123 | Makhan Singh | January 30, 1987 | Stampede show | Calgary, AB | 2 | 70 | | |
| 124 | Owen Hart | April 10, 1987 | Stampede show | Calgary, AB | 2 | 392 | | |
| 125 | Makhan Singh | May 6, 1988 | Stampede show | Calgary, AB | 3 | 217 | | |
| 126 | Don Muraco | December 9, 1988 | Stampede show | Medicine Hat, AB | 1 | 105 | | |
| 127 | Davey Boy Smith | March 24, 1989 | Stampede show | Calgary, AB | 2 | 35 | | |
| 128 | Larry Cameron | April 28, 1989 | Stampede show | Calgary, AB | 1 | 210 | | |
| — | Deactivated | November 24, 1989 | — | — | — | — | Stampede closed | |
Stampede North American Heavyweight Championship (1998-2008)
| 129 | Tatanka | April 8, 1998 | Stampede show | Tampa, FL | 1 | 743 | Defeated Sid Vicious in a fictitious tournament final to win the revived title | |
| 130 | Richard Pound | April 20, 2000 | Stampede show | Michigan | 1 | 358 | Fictitious title change. | |
| 131 | Bruce Hart | April 13, 2001 | Stampede show | Calgary, AB | 1 | 68 | | |
| 132 | Michael Modest | June 20, 2001 | Stampede show | Lethbridge, AB | 1 | 367 | | |
| 133 | Bruce Hart | June 22, 2002 | Stampede show | Calgary, AB | 2 | 28 | | |
| — | Vacated | July 20, 2002 | — | — | — | — | Hart vacates the title to concentrate on defenses of the Stampede Wrestling International Tag Team Championship. | |
| 134 | Karnage | August 22, 2003 | Stampede show | Calgary, AB | 1 | 147 | Defeated Harry Smith in a tournament final to win the vacant title. | |
| 135 | Harry Smith | January 16, 2004 | Stampede show | Calgary, AB | 1 | N/A | | |
| — | Vacated | April 20, 2005 | — | — | — | — | Championship vacated for undocumented reasons | |
| 136 | Eddie Mustang | June 3, 2005 | Stampede show | Calgary, AB | 1 | 159 | Defeated Karnage and Tiger Raj Singh in a 3-way match to win the vacant title. | |
| — | Vacated | September 9, 2005 | — | — | — | — | Championship vacated for undocumented reasons | |
| 137 | TJ Wilson | November 25, 2005 | Stampede show | Calgary, AB | 1 | 105 | Defeated Harry Smith in a tournament final to win the vacant title | |
| 138 | Apocalypse | March 10, 2006 | Stampede show | Calgary, AB | 1 | 189 | Apocalypse eliminates Wilson in a battle royal in which the title was on the line | |
| 139 | TJ Wilson | September 15, 2006 | CFL game | Calgary, AB | 2 | 15 | This match took place during halftime of a Calgary Stampeders vs. Winnipeg Blue Bombers CFL game at McMahon Stadium. | |
| 140 | Apocalypse | September 30, 2006 | Stampede show | N/A | 2 | 479 | Belt returned as Apocalypse claimed the September 15 match was not a sanctioned match. Wins a 3-way match against Wilson and Duke Durango. | |
| — | Vacated | August 22, 2007 | — | — | — | — | Championship vacated after Apocalypse suffer an injury. | |
| 141 | Chris Steel | September 21, 2007 | Stampede show | Calgary, AB | 1 | 84 | Won a Fatal 4-Way match against Gama Singh, Jr., Tiger Raj Singh, and "Ravenous" Randy Myers to win vacant title. | |
| 142 | Randy Myers | December 14, 2007 | Stampede show | Calgary, AB | 1 | 134 | | |
| — | Deactivated | April 26, 2008 | — | — | — | — | Stampede closed | |

== See also ==
- Stampede Wrestling
