= Kasavubu (wrestler) =

American professional wrestler (1956 – 1982)

Personal information
- Born: Jimmie Lee Banks; May 14, 1956 Akron, Ohio, U.S.
- Died: July 27, 1982 (aged 26)

Professional wrestling career
- Ring name(s): Ape Andrews; Apeman Andrews; Jimmy Banks; Joe Joe Andrews; Jojo Andrews; Kasavubu; Sugar Bear Brown; Tiger Jackson
- Billed height: 6 ft 4 in (193 cm)
- Billed weight: 330 lb (150 kg)
- Billed from: Uganda
- Trained by: Johnny Powers
- Debut: February 15, 1975

Jimmie Lee Banks (May 14, 1956 – July 27, 1982) was an American professional wrestler. He is best known for his appearances in Stampede Wrestling under the ring name Kasavubu and in the World Wide Wrestling Federation under the ring name Jojo Andrews.

== Professional wrestling career ==
=== Early career (1975) ===
Banks was trained by Canadian wrestler Johnny Powers. He started wrestling in February 1975 at the age of 18 for Big Time Wrestling in Detroit, Michigan as "Jimmy Banks".

=== World Wide Wrestling Federation (1976–1977) ===
In early 1976, Banks debuted in the World Wide Wrestling Federation (WWWF) under the ring name "Jojo Andrews". He wrestled regularly on WWWF Championship Wrestling, generally losing to more established stars. His regular opponents included José González, Bobo Brazil, Larry Zbyszko, Bob Backlund, and Tony Garea. In February 1977, Banks and Baron Mikel Scicluna unsuccessfully challenged Billy White Wolf and Chief Jay Strongbow for the WWWF Tag Team Championship. Banks left the WWWF in June 1977.

=== Stampede Wrestling (1977–1978) ===
In 1977, Banks began wrestling for Stu Hart's Stampede Wrestling promotion in Calgary, Alberta, Canada. He was originally known as "Tiger Jackson", before being renamed "Kasavubu". Billed from Uganda, he became one of the territory's top heels, managed by J. R. Foley.

His initial opponents included John Quinn, Gil Hayes, Rick Martel, and Gene Kiniski. In January 1978, he formed a short-lived tag team with Cuban Assassin. The peak of his career in Stampede Wrestling came on September 22, 1978, when he defeated Paddy Ryan in a no disqualification, no count-outs, two out of three falls match in the Victoria Pavilion to win the Stampede North American Heavyweight Championship, the promotion's most prestigious title. He dropped the title to Alo Leilani on November 12, 1978 after a handful of defences. Kasavubu left Stampede Wrestling later that year.

=== International Wrestling Enterprise (1978) ===
Banks made two tours of Japan with International Wrestling Enterprise (IWE) in 1978 as "the Kasavubu". His first tour ran from February to March 1978 as part of IWE's "Big Challenge Series", with Jones competing against opponents such as Rusher Kimura, Animal Hamaguchi, and Mighty Inoue. During the tour, he teamed on several occasions with fellow gaijin Killer Brooks. Banks made his second tour from June to July 1978 as part of IWE's "Big Summer Series". In July 1978, Banks unsuccessfully challenged Kimura for the IWA World Heavyweight Championship in a cage match in Akita Prefecture, losing by knockout.

=== World Wrestling Federation (1979–1980) ===
After making a handful of appearances with the West Virginia-based Three Rivers Wrestling Association as "Apeman Andrews" in early 1979, Banks returned to the World Wide Wrestling Federation - since renamed the World Wrestling Federation (WWF) - in mid-1979, where he was once again named "Jojo Andrews". In October 1979, he teamed with José Estrada and then Billy Coleman to unsuccessfully challenge Ivan Putski and Tito Santana for the WWF Tag Team Championship. In December 1979, he teamed with Allen Coage to unsuccessfully challenge Riki Choshu and Seiji Sakaguchi for the NWA North American Tag Team Championship. Banks' second run with the WWF lasted until May 1980, when he left the company to return to Stampede Wrestling.

=== Stampede Wrestling (1980) ===
Banks returned to Stampede Wrestling in May 1980. Later that month, he unsuccessfully challenged Bret Hart for the Stampede North American Heavyweight Championship. The following month, he teamed with Dynamite Kid to defeat Bret Hart and Keith Hart for Stampede Wrestling International Tag Team Championship. The Hart Brothers regained the title later that month. In July 1980, Banks teamed with Mr. Sakurada to win the titles for a second time; they held the titles until September 1980, when they lost to Hercules Ayala and Jim Neidhart. In September and October, Banks teamed with a series of partners in unsuccessful attempts to regain the titles. Banks' tenure in Stampede Wrestling came to a sudden end in November 1980 due to health issues.

=== Late career (1981–1982) ===
Banks returned to the ring in 1981 with the Windsor, Ontario-based Superstars of Wrestling promotion. He wrestled his final recorded match in February 1982, appearing with the International Wrestling Federation in Allentown, Pennsylvania as Jojo Andrews.

== Death ==
Banks suffered from diabetes-related health problems; at one point, he had been using a dialysis machine in between matches. He returned to the United States to receive a kidney transplant from his brother. On July 27, 1982, Banks suffered a fatal heart attack while undergoing the transplant surgery. He was 26 years old. That summer, a memorial show was held in Banks' hometown to raise money for his family; wrestlers appearing on the show included Larry Winters, Ed Bonzo, and Zoltan the Great.

== Championships and accomplishments ==
- Stampede Wrestling
  - Stampede North American Heavyweight Championship (1 time)
  - Stampede Wrestling International Tag Team Championship (2 times) – with Dynamite Kid (1 time) and Mr. Sakurada (1 time)
