= Bob Lueck =

Canadian football player (born 1943)

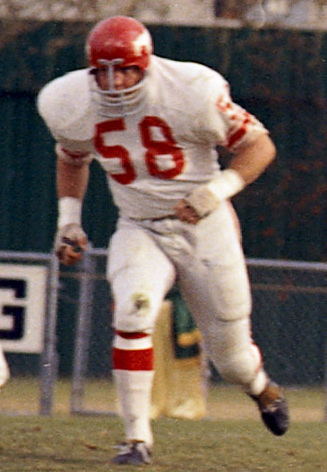
- Lueck with the Calgary Stampeders in 1970

Profile
- Position: Guard

Personal information
- Born: January 20, 1943 (age 83); Litchfield Park, Arizona, U.S.
- Listed height: 6 ft 2 in (1.88 m)
- Listed weight: 250 lb (113 kg)

Career information
- High school: Agua Fria High School
- College: Arizona State University

Career history
- 1966–1970: Calgary Stampeders
- 1971–1972: Winnipeg Blue Bombers

Awards and highlights
- CFL All-Star (1967, 1968, 1971, 1972)

Bob Lueck (born January 20, 1943) is an American-born Canadian football player who played for the Calgary Stampeders and Winnipeg Blue Bombers. He was also a professional wrestler in the early-1970s.

== Biography ==
Lueck grew up in rural in Litchfield Park, Arizona, where his family operated a dairy farm. Lueck attended Agua Fria High School, then attended Arizona State University, where he played football.

Lueck's professional football career spanned from 1966 to 1972, during which he played in the Canadian Football League for the Calgary Stampeders and Winnipeg Blue Bombers.

In 1969, Lueck encouraged his friend Eldridge Wayne Coleman Jr. to become a professional wrestler. Coleman went on to wrestle as "Superstar" Billy Graham. In 1970, he encouraged fellow football player Ron Pritchard to become a wrestler, with Pritchard going on to train under Stu Hart. Lueck made his own professional wrestling debut that same year during the off-season, also training under Hart. He primarily wrestled for Hart's Calgary, Alberta-based Stampede Wrestling promotion during the football off season. In November 1971, Lueck won the sole championship of his career, defeating Black Angus Campbell for the Stampede Wrestling North American Heavyweight Championship; he lost the title to Kurt Von Hess the following month. Lueck retired from professional wrestling in 1973 at his wife's request.

Lueck's brother Bill Lueck was also a football player, playing in the National Football League for the Green Bay Packers and the Philadelphia Eagles. His great nephew Matteo Mele played football for the Washington Huskies.

== Championships and accomplishments ==
=== Football ===
- Arizona State University
  - Mike Bartholomew Award

=== Professional wrestling ===
- Stampede Wrestling
  - Stampede Wrestling North American Heavyweight Championship (1 time)

== See also ==
- List of gridiron football players who became professional wrestlers
