= Stu Hart's 88th Birthday Celebration =

- Promotion: Stampede Wrestling
- Date: May 2, 2003
- City: Calgary, Alberta
- Venue: Ogden Legion Hall
- Tagline: Stampede Wrestling 50th Anniversary Show

Event chronology
← Previous; Stu Hart 50th Anniversary Show	Next → Last

The Stu Hart's 88th Birthday Celebration (also called Stampede Wrestling 50th Anniversary Show) was a professional wrestling supercard produced by the Stampede Wrestling promotion that took place on May 2, 2003, at the Ogden Legion Hall in Calgary, Alberta. It was initially to be held at the Victoria Pavilion, however, the event was later moved to another venue. The show was held to celebrate Stu Hart's 88th birthday as well as the 50th anniversary of Stampede Wrestling. Ralph Klein, then Premier of Alberta, made a guest appearance at the event to honor the Hart wrestling family. It was second reunion show to be held since the Stu Hart 50th Anniversary Show in 1995. The event featured talent from both the original Stampede Wrestling and Ross and Bruce Hart's version. Seven professional wrestling matches were featured on the card.

== Event ==
Two of the matches on the undercard were Sabu versus Teddy Hart in a hardcore match, and Bruce Hart versus Principal Richard Pound. Another featured match was a standard wrestling match between Nattie Neidhart and Belle Lovitz. The main event was a tag team match between The Stampede Bulldogs (Harry Smith and T.J. Wilson) and the team of A.J. Styles and The Black Dragon. Wilson later claimed that their match was a great learning experience for him especially as he was preparing to enter New Japan Pro-Wrestling's Best of the Super Juniors that summer.

== Results ==
No.	Results	Stipulations	Times
1	Jack Flash defeated Nick Nog and Pete Wilson	Three-Way Dance	15:02
2	Dan Fox defeated Brayden Schultz and Trevor Ing (kids match)	Triple Threat match	9:00
3	Nattie Neidhart defeated Belle Lovitz	Singles match	10:12
4	Johnny Devine, Duke Durrango and Randy Myers defeated Kirk Melnick, Rod Rage and Jason Carter	Six-man tag team match	11:25
5	Bruce Hart defeated Principal Richard Pound by countout	Singles match	—
6	Juggernaut and Apocalypse defeated Dave Swift and The Highlander	Tag team match	18:12
7	Sabu vs. Teddy Hart ended in a no-contest	Hardcore match	18:12
8	The Stampede Bulldogs (Harry Smith and T.J. Wilson) defeated A.J. Styles and The Black Dragon	Tag team match	22:50

== Reception ==
The professional wrestling section, SLAM! Wrestling, of the Canadian Online Explorer website rated the entire event a 10 out of 10 stars.

== See also ==
- Professional wrestling in Canada
