= NWA Brass Knuckles Championship (Tri-State version) =

Professional wrestling championship

Details
- Promotion: NWA Tri-State
- Date established: 1970s
- Date retired: October, 1981
Statistics
- First champion: Bill Watts
- Final champion: Don Fargo
- Most reigns: Bill Watts (3 reigns)

The Tri-State version of the NWA Brass Knuckles Championship was a secondary championship that was defended sporadically and periodically in the NWA Tri-State promotion. Created in 1970, the title was used in specialty matches in which the combatants would wear brass knuckles. Throughout the history of the championship, it was activated for brief periods of time to spark interest in crowds. Usually, the novelty of the brass knuckles matches wore off and promoter Leroy McGuirk would abandon the title for a period of time and then begin using it again. This took place off and on until the Tri-State promotion closed in early 1982. There were other brass knuckles championships used in the NWA, such as in Texas and Florida, where the titles were more prominent and defended on a regular basis.

== Title history ==
Wrestler	Reigns	Date	Location	Notes
Bill Watts	1	1970	Unknown	N/A
Sputnik Monroe	1	1971		
Dusty Rhodes	1	April 25, 1971	Shreveport, LA	
Bill Watts	2	August 23, 1971	Shreveport, LA	
The Stomper	1	March 6, 1972	Tulsa Oklahoma	N/A
Bob Sweetan	1	June 12, 1972	Tulsa, Oklahoma	
Rip Tyler	1	May 6, 1974	Shreveport, Louisiana	N/A
Bob Sweetan	2	October 1974	Unknown	N/A
Dick Murdoch	1	October 6 1975	Tulsa Oklahoma	N/A
Killer Karl Kox	1	October 13 1975	Tulsa Oklahoma	N/A
Bob Sweetan	3	Oct 1976		
Killer Karl Kox	2	October 26 1976	Shreveport LA	
Bob Sweetan	4	October 1976		
Ken Patera	1	November 9, 1976	Shreveport LA	N/A
Bobby Jaggers	1	December 2, 1976	Little Rock, Arkansas	N/A
Thunderbolt Patterson	1	April 1, 1978	New Orleans, Louisiana	Defeats Stan Hansen for the vacant title
Stan Hansen	1	April 1978		
Paul Orndorff	1	April 25, 1978	Shreveport LA	
Ron Bass	1	November 1978		
Killer Karl Kox	3	December 1978		
Ron Bass	2	December 25, 1978	New Orleans, Louisiana	Defeats Killer Karl Kox for the vacant title
Mike Sharpe	1	March 12, 1979	Tulsa Oklahoma	N/A
Angelo Mosca	1	July 9, 1979	Tulsa, Oklahoma	N/A
Bill Watts	3	1979	Unknown	N/A
Don Fargo	1	October, 1981	Unknown	Vacates the title at an unknown date and the promotion closes in 1982

== See also ==
- List of National Wrestling Alliance championships
- Hardcore wrestling
