= Kazuo Sakurada =

Japanese professional wrestler (1948–2020)

Kazuo Sakurada 桜田一男
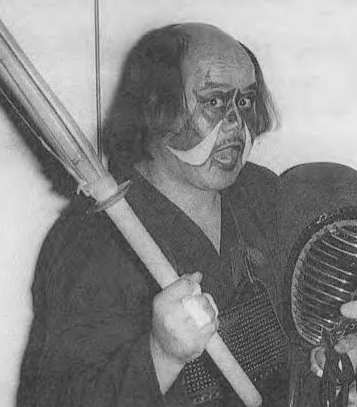
- Sakurada in 1986, holding the Kendo Nagasaki mask

Personal information
- Born: September 26, 1948 Abashiri, Hokkaido, Allied-occupied Japan
- Died: January 12, 2020 (aged 71) Chiba, Chiba, Japan

Professional wrestling career
- Ring names: Black Ninja; Chan Chung; The Dragon Master; Kendo Nagasaki; Mr. Sakurada; Kazuo Sakurada; Rambo Sakurada; Dream Machine; Great Kendo; White Ninja
- Billed height: 1.88 m (6 ft 2 in)
- Billed weight: 119 kg (262 lb)
- Debut: June 21, 1971
- Retired: July 7, 2000

Kazuo Sakurada (桜田 一男, Sakurada Kazuo; September 26, 1948 – January 12, 2020), better known as Mr. Sakurada, The Dragonmaster, and as the Japanese version of Kendo Nagasaki (ケンドー・ナガサキ, Kendō Nagasaki), was a Japanese professional wrestler. He was best known for his work in Stampede Wrestling, National Wrestling Alliance, and World Championship Wrestling. Sakurada was also highly regarded by Bret Hart as one of his most significant trainers alongside Katsui Adachi or Mr. Hito, with whom he taught extensively in Hart Dungeon.

== Sumo wrestling career ==
Midorimine
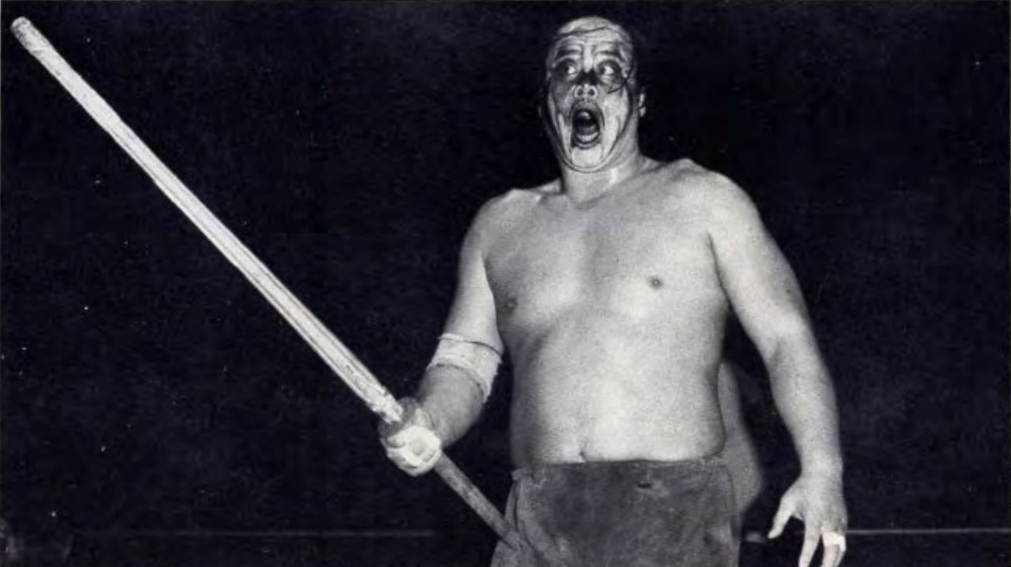

Personal information
- Native name: 翠巒
- Height: 1.87 m (6 ft 1 1/2 in)
- Weight: 115 kg (254 lb)

Sport
- Sport: Sumo
- Retired: March 1971
- Heya: Tatsunami
- Record: 148-132-21
- Debut: January 1964
- Highest rank: Makushita 13 (January 1970)
- Championships: 1 (Jonidan)

Kazuo Sakurada was born on September 26, 1948, in Abashiri, Hokkaido. After graduating from junior high school, he joined the Tatsunami stable to pursue sumo. While there, he first met future professional wrestler Genichiro Tenryu. He made his sumo debut in January 1964 under his last name (櫻田). In September 1966, he changed his shikona to Abashirinada Kazuo (網走洋 一男). In May 1969, he changed his name again to Midorimine (翠巒). Throughout his seven-year career in sumo, his highest rank was makushita 13, and his only tournament championship win was in September 1966, with an undefeated record of seven wins. In March 1971, Sakurada retired from sumo wrestling.

=== Career record ===
Midorimine
Year	January Hatsu basho, Tokyo	March Haru basho, Osaka	May Natsu basho, Tokyo	July Nagoya basho, Nagoya	September Aki basho, Tokyo	November Kyūshū basho, Fukuoka
1964	(Maezumo)	East Jonokuchi #16; 6–1	East Jonidan #80; 4–3	East Jonidan #56; 4–3	East Jonidan #33; 2–5	East Jonidan #61; 5–2
1965	West Jonidan #14; 3–4	West Jonidan #30; 4–3	West Jonidan #5; 3–4	West Jonidan #21; 5–2	West Sandanme #87; 4–3	East Sandanme #67; 4–3
1966	East Sandanme #49; 4–3	West Sandanme #38; 1–6	West Sandanme #68; 3–4	East Sandanme #77; Sat out due to injury 0–0–7	West Jonidan #24; 7–0; Champion	West Sandanme #12; 3–4
1967	West Sandanme #20; 4–3	East Sandanme #4; 3–4	West Sandanme #52; 4–3	West Sandanme #33; 4–3	East Sandanme #22; 5–2	East Sandanme #1; 5–2
1968	West Makushita #39; 1–6	East Sandanme #5; 2–5	West Sandanme #27; 4–3	East Sandanme #18; 3–4	West Sandanme #32; 4–3	East Sandanme #20; 4–3
1969	West Sandanme #13; 4–3	West Sandanme #1; 3–4	East Sandanme #7; 5–2	West Makushita #43; 4–3	West Makushita #33; 5–2	East Makushita #19; 4–3
1970	West Makushita #13; 3–4	West Makushita #17; 4–3	West Makushita #14; 3–4	East Makushita #19; 4–3	East Makushita #14; 2–5	Makushita #26; 2–5
1971	East Makushita #40; Sat out due to injury 0–0–7	East Sandanme #10; Retired; 0–0–7	x	x	x	x
Record given as wins–losses–absences Top division champion Top division runner-up Retired Lower divisions Non-participation Sanshō key: F=Fighting spirit; O=Outstanding performance; T=Technique Also shown: ★=Kinboshi; P=Playoff(s); Divisions: Makuuchi — Jūryō — Makushita — Sandanme — Jonidan — Jonokuchi Makuuchi ranks: Yokozuna — Ōzeki — Sekiwake — Komusubi — Maegashira

== Professional wrestling career ==
=== Early years (1971–1976) ===
Kazuo Sakurada debuted on June 21, 1971, in the old Japan Pro Wrestling Alliance against Kim Duk. On March 8, 1973, he became involved in a shoot when his mid-card match against rookie Tsutomu Oshiro went horribly wrong and Sakurada began beating Oshiro severely, knocking him out of the ring. Oshiro was going to jump to New Japan Pro-Wrestling along with his mentor Seiji Sakaguchi and friend Kengo Kimura, and Sakurada took actions into his own hands, blaming them for jumping ship. When the JPWA closed in April 1973 Sakurada joined All Japan Pro Wrestling.

In 1975, he joined International Wrestling Enterprise.

=== United States and Stampede Wrestling (1976–1981) ===
In 1976, Sakurada made his North America debut in Texas. Now as Mr. Sakurada, he found his earliest success in Stampede Wrestling. During his time in Stampede Wrestling, Sakurada trained Bret Hart to wrestle. He defeated two-time champion Leo Burke to win his first and only Stampede North American Heavyweight Championship on May 20, 1978, in Edmonton, Alberta. (Note: Duncan & Will (2000) pp. 339–340, Chapter: "(Calgary) Alberta: Stampede Wrestling North American Heavyweight Title [Hart]") He held the title for a little over three months before losing to Paddy Ryan on September 1. He then became highly regarded in Stampede's tag team division, defeating Keith and Bret Hart in early 1979 to win his first Stampede International Tag Team Championship with Mr. Hito. (Note: Duncan & Will (2000) pp. 340–341, Chapter: "(Calgary) Alberta: Stampede Wrestling International Tag Team Title [Hart]") Their second win came later on the same year after the defeat of Dory Funk Jr. and Larry Lane, only to be toppled once again by the Hart brothers. By 1980, Hito had moved on to singles competition, leaving Sakurada to form a team with Kasavubu. They, too, defeated the Harts, marking Sakurada's third and final tag team championship reign in Stampede. This reign would be ended at the hands of the Harts' brother-in-law Jim Neidhart and Hercules Ayala that same year.

=== Continental Wrestling Association (1981–1982) ===
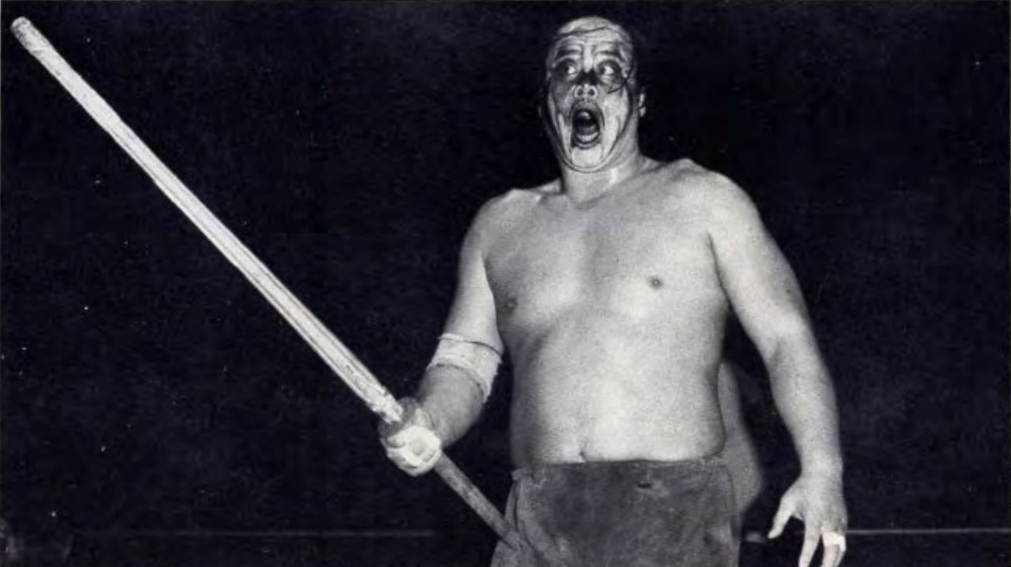
Sakurada with a kendo stick, circa 1984

In the early 1980s, Sakurada had started working in various southern American promotions, starting with the Continental Wrestling Association in Memphis. During this time, he began using the "Kendo Nagasaki'" gimmick, a Japanese Samurai character previously made famous by British wrestler Peter Thornley dating back to 1964. This incarnation was vastly different however; rather than wearing a mask, Sakurada wore face paint and a highly alternate style altogether. His fierce character also made famous the Asian mist and frequently employed the Kendo stick as his signature weapon. As Nagasaki, he found a most prominent win in his victory over Jerry Lawler for the NWA/AWA Southern Heavyweight Title in 1982. (Note: Duncan & Will (2000) p. 195, Chapter: "Tennessee (Memphis): NWA / AWA Southern Heavyweight Title [Lawler]") He would lose the title back to Lawler before pursuing new territory.

=== National Wrestling Alliance (1982–1989) ===
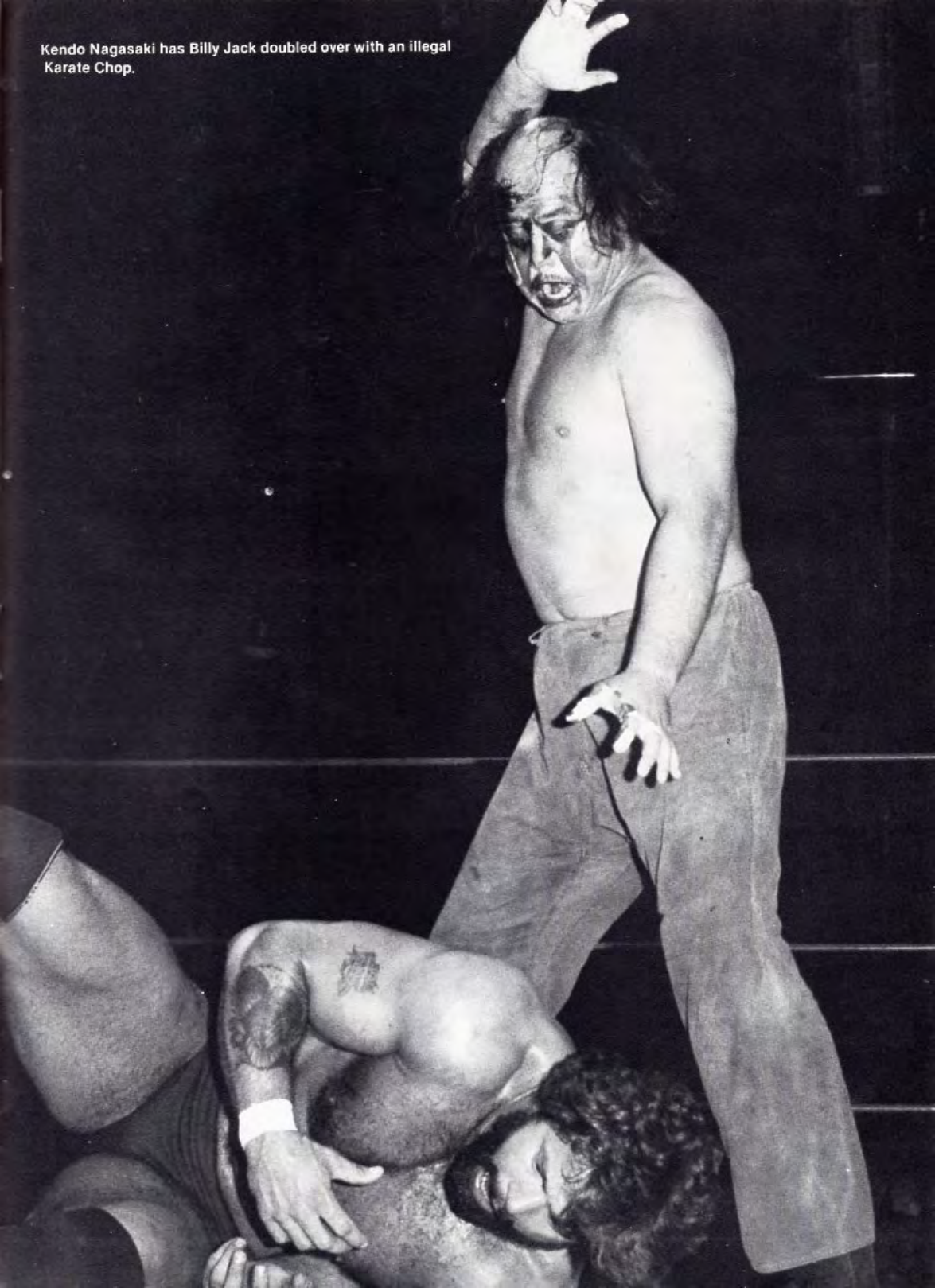
Sakurada (top) about to hit Billy Jack Haynes (bottom) with a karate chop, circa 1984

After the Memphis territory, Nagasaki worked for NWA territories World Wrestling Council, Florida Championship Wrestling and Southeastern Championship Wrestling. He faced some of the top competition in the Florida territory throughout 1983 and 1984, and on January 22, 1984, he captured the NWA Florida Heavyweight Championship from Mike Rotunda. (Note: Duncan & Will (2000) pp. 163–164, Chapter: (Miami) Florida: NWA Florida Heavyweight Title [Graham]") This kicked off a rivalry with the reputable Billy Jack Haynes, resulting in his title victory over Nagasaki in March of the same year. During his time with CWF, Nagasaki would also tag team with White Ninja. Following his departure from CWF, Nagasaki briefly worked for Von Erich's World Class Championship Wrestling in the mid '80s as "White Ninja", frequently partnering with "Super Black Ninja". (Note: The same person who portrayed the White Ninja) During the 1980s, Nagasaki teamed with Mr. Pogo as "the Ninja Express". The Ninja Express briefly returned to Japan to participate in New Japan Pro-Wrestling's Japan Cup tag team tournament in late 1987, finishing in second-to-last place.

=== World Championship Wrestling (1989–1990) ===
In 1989, he performed on WCW television, using the ring name "The Dragonmaster". While there, he joined Gary Hart's J-Tex Corporation stable consisting of Terry Funk, Dick Slater, Buzz Sawyer, and The Great Muta. (Note: previously worked with Sakurada as White Ninja and Super Black Ninja) This heel group, conceived in July 1989, feuded with the Four Horsemen until ultimately disbanding in February 1990 after a final steel cage match at the Clash of the Champions X: Texas Shootout, a match largely overshadowed by the other Horsemen turning heel on Sting.

=== Return to Japan (1990–2000) ===
In 1990, after so many years competing in North America, he returned to Japan as Kendo Nagasaki. He first joined Frontier Martial-Arts Wrestling, but later joined Super World of Sports. Following SWS's collapse in 1992, he formed his own promotion, NOW (Network of Wrestling). In 1995, he closed NOW, and with a new business partner Shinya Kojika, formed Big Japan Pro Wrestling. Nagasaki teamed with Chris Michaels defeating Damian Stone and Joel Hartgood ECW's Big Ass Extreme Bash. After leaving BJW in 1999, Nagasaki wrestled semi-actively until 2000 where he had his last match on July 7, 2000, teaming with Ichiro Yaguchi, Shoji Nakamaki, and Yase Yaguchi in a loss to Atsushi Onita, Exciting Yoshida, Mitsunobu Kikuzawa, and Naoshi Sano on an Onita Pro show.

== Mixed martial arts ==
On September 26, 1995, in Setagaya, Tokyo, Sakurada lost a mixed martial arts match to American kickboxer Zane Frazier via knockout punch at Shooto: Vale Tudo Perception. At the time, Sakurada had the reputation by pro wrestling insiders as being one of the toughest wrestlers in a street fight, as well as a shooter. This was possibly one of the reasons why he was chosen to take this fight, despite being 47 years old at the time.

=== Mixed martial arts record ===
Professional record breakdown
1 match	0 wins	1 loss
By knockout	0	1
By submission	0	0
By decision	0	0

Res.	Record	Opponent	Method	Event	Date	Round	Time	Location	Notes
Loss	0–1	(United States) Zane Frazier	KO (punch)	Shooto: Vale Tudo Perception	September 26, 1995	1	0:36	Tokyo, Japan	

== Death ==
On January 12, 2020, Sakurada died at age 71 due to arrhythmia.

== Championships and accomplishments ==
- Championship Wrestling from Florida
  - NWA Florida Heavyweight Championship (1 time)
  - NWA Florida Tag Team Championship (1 time) - with Mr. Hito (Note: Duncan & Will (2000) p. 164, Chapter: (Miami) Florida: NWA Florida Tag Team Title [Graham]")
- Continental Wrestling Association
  - AWA Southern Heavyweight Championship (1 time)
- NWA Big Time Wrestling
  - NWA American Tag Team Championship (3 times) – with Mr. Hito (Note: Duncan & Will (2000) pp. 275–276, Chapter: "(Dallas) Texas: NWA American Tag Team Title [Von Erich]") (1 time) with Chan Chang
- Pacific Northwest Wrestling
  - NWA Pacific Northwest Tag Team Championship (1 time) – with Colonel DeBeers (Note: Duncan & Will (2000) pp. 317–320, Chapter: "(Oregon & Washington) Portland: NWA Pacific Northwest Tag Team Title")
- Pro Wrestling Illustrated
  - PWI ranked him #250 of the 500 best wrestlers in the PWI 500 in 1994
  - PWI ranked him #307 of the 500 best singles wrestlers during the PWI Years in 2003
- Stampede Wrestling
  - NWA International Tag Team Championship/Stampede International Tag Team Championship (3 times) – with Mr. Hito (2) and Kasavubu (1)
  - Stampede North American Heavyweight Championship (1 time)
  - Stampede Wrestling Hall of Fame
- Texas Wrestling Federation
  - TWF Asian Heavyweight Championship (1 time) (Note: Duncan & Will (2000) p. 283, Chapter: "Texas: TWF Asian Heavyweight Title")
- World Wrestling Council
  - WWC World Tag Team Championship (4 times) – with Mr. Pogo (Note: Duncan & Will (2000) pp. 324–325, Chapter: "(Puerto Rico) Puerto Rico: WWC World Tag Team Title [Colon]")
