= Mr. Hito =

Japanese professional wrestler

Personal information
- Born: Katsuji Adachi; April 25, 1942 Tennōji-ku, Osaka, Japan
- Died: April 21, 2010 (aged 67) Osaka, Japan

Professional wrestling career
- Ring name(s): Mr. Hito; Tokyo Joe; Katsuji Adachi
- Billed height: 1.83 m (6 ft 0 in)
- Billed weight: 112 kg (247 lb)
- Debut: June 8, 1967
- Retired: March 25, 1988

Katsuji Adachi (安達勝治, Adachi Katsuji) (April 25, 1942 – April 21, 2010), better known as Mr. Hito, was a Japanese professional wrestler who competed in North American and Japanese regional promotions from the 1950s until the mid-1980s. Most notably, he was the tag team partner of Mr. Moto (who was one of the earliest Japanese "heels") while wrestling in National Wrestling Alliance regional territories during the late 1950s.

He is perhaps best known for his work in Stu Hart's Stampede Wrestling, where he won multiple championship titles. He is also highly regarded by Bret Hart as his most significant trainer alongside Kazuo Sakurada (a.k.a. Mr. Sakurada), who he trained with extensively in Stu Hart's "Dungeon."

== Sumo wrestling career ==
Katsuji Adachi debuted in sumo wrestling in 1956 at the age of 14. He was part of the Dewanoumi stable under the shikona Naniwaumi. His highest rank was Makushita 17. He retired from sumo in January 1967.

== Professional wrestling career ==
=== Japan (1967–1973) ===
Katsuji Adachi debuted for Japan Wrestling Association in June 1967. He lost to Haruka Eigen at the Kawasaki Stadium on July 1, 1969. The following year, Adachi appeared in the JWA New Year Champion Series in January 1970 and the Golden Series in July before leaving the country to compete in North America during the early 1970s.

=== North America (1973–1988) ===
As Tokyo Joe, he and Kung Fu Lee were managed by Percival A. Friend in NWA Central States in 1973. The following year, he was one of three Japanese wrestlers along with Kung Fu Lee and Jumbo Tsuruta who participated in a 12-man battle royal on April 7, 1974. Held in the Kiel Auditorium in St. Louis, Missouri, the event also included André the Giant, Bobo Brazil, Bill Miller, Billy Red Lyons, Black Angus Campbell, Reggie Parks, Frank Valois, Billy Howard and Dory Funk Jr. who eventually won the event.

Hito saw great success as a tag team wrestler in Stampede Wrestling in Calgary, winning the NWA International Tag Team Championship (Calgary version) eight times. During this time, as part of Big Bad John's "army" with King Curtis Iaukea and John Quinn, he feuded with "Cowboy" Dan Kroffat, Larry Lane and Mark Lewin after attacking the then 60-year-old Stu Hart who had been handcuffed to the ring ropes.

His first win took place in 1975 with partner John Quinn, but the titles were then vacated. To reclaim them that same year, Hito teamed with Gil Hayes to win a tag team tournament. The following year, he and Higo "Animal" Hamaguchi won the titles. Then Michel Martel helped him gain his fourth tag title victory in 1977. Two years passed until he gained his fifth and sixth titles with Mr. Sakurada, winning and losing the titles against the likes of Bret and Keith Hart, Dory Funk Jr., and Leo Burke. Hito then pursued singles competition. He and Mr. Sakaruda would also have a short stint in Championship Wrestling from Florida in late 1979 and World Class Championship Wrestling the following year, winning the tag team titles in both promotions.

Hito won his first Stampede North American Heavyweight Championship on September 18, 1981, from David Schultz, only to lose it back the following month. His second title reign lasted from November 6, 1981, until March 19 the following year, in which he was forced to vacate it due injuries resulting from an automobile accident in early 1982. While driving to a show in Lethbridge with Bruce Hart, Jim Neidhart, Gerry Morrow and a Stampede road hand, he had suffered facial injuries as well as a broken wrist and a dislocated knee after hitting the back tires of semi-trailer as it was pulling into a roadside gas station.

On March 11, 1983, Hito won his eighth NWA International Tag Team Championship with Jim Neidhart in Calgary, Alberta. They would win them one last time from Mike Shaw and Mike Miller the same year. In March 1988, he retired from in-ring competition and remained to be Stu Hart's right-hand man in the Dungeon.

== Retirement and death ==
Around 2003, Adachi moved back to Osaka, Japan, to work at his sister's okonomiyaki restaurant. In 2005, he moved back to Calgary. In August 2006, he made a guest appearance for Hiroshi Hase's retirement ceremony.

According to Bret Hart, Adachi was one of Stu Hart's most trusted foremen and reliable workers in the heyday of Stampede Wrestling; Bret's DVD set also features rare footage of Adachi and Sakurada squashing him. He has credited Adachi as being one of his greatest mentors, stating, "People often say to me, where would wrestling be without Bret Hart. But my answer to that is, where would Bret Hart be without Mr. Hito."

Adachi died on April 21, 2010, in Osaka. His cause of death is related to diabetes, which he had suffered from for several years and it caused the amputation of his right leg in October 2009.

== Championships and accomplishments ==
- Championship Wrestling from Florida

- NWA Florida Tag Team Championship (1 time) – with Mr. Sakurada

- Maple Leaf Wrestling

- NWA Canadian Open Tag Team Championship (1 time) – with Mr. Moto

- NWA Big Time Wrestling

- NWA American Tag Team Championship (3 times) – with Mr. Sakurada

- Stampede Wrestling

- NWA International Tag Team Championship (Calgary version) (8 times) – with John Quinn (1), Gil Hayes (2), Higo Hamaguchi (1), Michael Martel (1), Mr. Sakurada (2), and Jim Neidhart (1)
- Stampede North American Heavyweight Championship (2 times)
- Stampede Wrestling Hall of Fame (Class of 1995)
