= Bill Watts =

American professional wrestler and wrestling promoter (1939–2026)

- Watts in 1986

Personal information
- Born: William F. Watts Jr. May 5, 1939 Oklahoma City, Oklahoma, U.S.
- Died: November 17, 2026 (aged 87)

Professional wrestling career
- Ring names: Bill Watts; Doctor Scarlett; Dr. Scarlett
- Billed height: 6 ft 3 in (1.91 m)
- Billed weight: 297 lb (135 kg)
- Debut: 1962
- Retired: 1986
- Football career

Profile
- Positions: Guard, linebacker

Career information
- High school: Putnam City (Warr Acres, Oklahoma)
- College: Oklahoma
- NFL draft: 1961: undrafted

Career history
- Houston Oilers (1961)*; Indianapolis Warriors
- * Offseason or practice squad member only

William F. Watts Jr. (May 5, 1939 – November 17, 2026) was an American professional wrestler, promoter and American football player. He garnered fame under his "Cowboy" gimmick in his wrestling career, and then as a promoter in the Mid-South United States, which grew to become the Universal Wrestling Federation (UWF). Watts also worked under the ring name Doctor Scarlett which was sometimes stylised as Dr. Scarlett.

In 1992, Watts was the Executive Vice President of World Championship Wrestling (WCW) but after clashes with management over a number of issues, as well as feeling pressure from Hank Aaron over an interview in which Watts supported a business owner's right to refuse service based on race, he resigned.

In 1995, Watts briefly worked as a booker for the World Wrestling Federation (WWF; now WWE). In 2009, he was inducted into the WWE Hall of Fame.

== Football career ==
Watts played as a linebacker for his high school football team, the Putnam City Pirates. Bud Wilkinson recruited him to play for the Oklahoma Sooners, where he played as a guard during his sophomore and junior years. However, his junior year was marred by a near fatal car accident involving him and his mother, resulting in him going into a coma. When he came out, he had lost a significant amount of weight, and had to put it back on, despite the coaches at the time preferring their players to be small and quick, which Watts had struggled with before the accident. Former Sooners teammate Wahoo McDaniel (then of the Houston Oilers of the AFL), introduced him to professional wrestling for the first time, something McDaniel did in the off-season. Watts turned professional in 1961 and joined the Oilers, but did not last long there, and according to a shoot interview, he left after knocking out a coach.

Through McDaniel's friendship with defensive coach Bob Griffin, Watts played for the Indianapolis Warriors of the United Football League, while also being able to wrestle for NWA Indianapolis. Watts then had a try-out with the Minnesota Vikings of the National Football League (NFL), but after a discussion with general manager Jim Finks, who wanted him to quit his wrestling career, Watts left the Vikings having decided he could make more money back in Oklahoma.

== Professional wrestling career ==
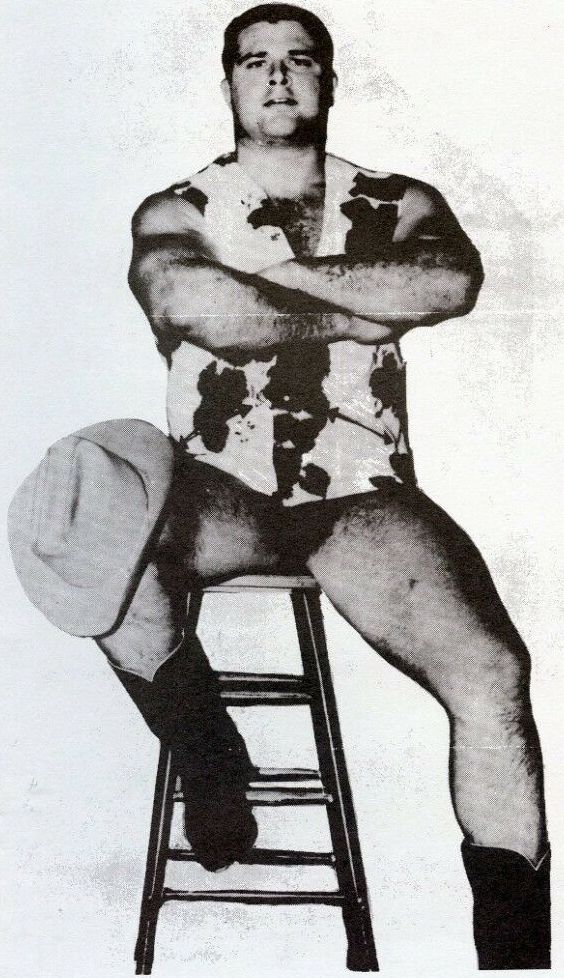
Watts in 1968

=== Wrestling career (1962–1979) ===
As a professional wrestler, he famously feuded with WWWF Champion Bruno Sammartino, but was unable to win the title. In the 1960s, he wrestled in many areas, such as San Francisco, Chicago, St. Louis, and even Japan for All Japan Pro Wrestling (AJPW). During these periods, Watts challenged for both the National Wrestling Alliance (NWA) and American Wrestling Association (AWA) versions of the World Title. Watts also had a successful run winning tag belts with Buck Robley in the NWA Tri-State/Mid South Wrestling before he became head promotor in the Oklahoma/Louisiana areas.

=== Booking career (1979–1995) ===
==== Mid-South Wrestling / Universal Wrestling Federation (1979–1987) ====
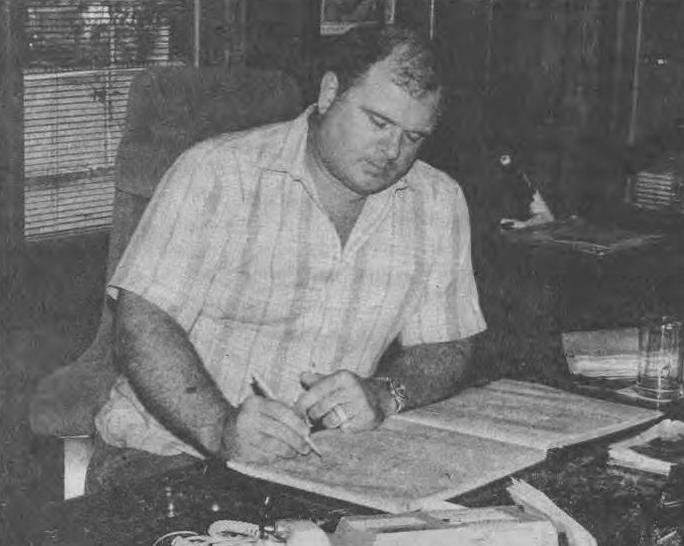
Watts during his time as a Mid South Wrestling booker, c. 1986

Watts is perhaps even more famous for being a pioneering promoter in the Mid-South area of the United States, with his base of operation being in the Shreveport, Louisiana area. His promotion was known as Mid-South Wrestling. He is often credited with creating the current and popular "episodic" style of TV wrestling, building solid creative storylines week-on-week, with an emphasis on solid in-ring action with dependable wrestlers like "Dr. Death" Steve Williams, The Junkyard Dog, Ted DiBiase and Jim Duggan. He is an outspoken critic on breaking kayfabe and "smart" wrestling fans. A Watts-run promotion always had face and heel wrestlers dress in different locker rooms and to have faces and heels not meet publicly. He has also been known to revamp his booking plans in order to protect the business from such fans.

After losing over half a million dollars, Watts sold the UWF to NWA Mid-Atlantic's Jim Crockett Promotions, who kept many of their stars, such as Sting. Instead of having UWF as a separate organization, Crockett sent his mid-card wrestlers to the UWF and had them quickly win their titles. Eventually, the UWF folded, and Crockett would be bought out by Ted Turner in 1988. In April 1989, after firing George Scott, WCW offered Watts the chance to book, but he declined the offer and WCW instead decided to go with a booking committee, which included Ric Flair and Kevin Sullivan.

==== World Championship Wrestling (1992–1993) ====
Watts became Executive Vice President of World Championship Wrestling, succeeding short-tenured Kip Frey in 1992. He took many of his old-school values with him, such as minimizing action outside the ring and banning moves from the top rope and the babyfaces and heels separation among other series of rules that he reportedly detailed in a memo to wrestlers. His tenure was not long, nor were his ideas overly embraced. According to his autobiography, Controversy Creates Ca$h, Eric Bischoff, who worked under Watts at the time, felt Watts would intimidate anyone he was talking to and was only interested in taking the WCW product back to 1970s standards, with poorly lit arenas and house shows in remote, rural towns.

The circumstances of Watts' departure in 1993 are controversial. Prior to taking the job with WCW, Watts had given an interview to Wade Keller of the Pro Wrestling Torch. After a lengthy interview on wrestling, Watts commented on Lester Maddox, a 1960s restaurant owner and segregationist, as well as a former governor of Georgia, who refused service to black customers. Watts supported the owner's position, illegal under the Civil Rights Act of 1964, that any business owner had a right to discriminate as did Watts in his business. Watts further expressed his view that slavery was beneficial for bringing black people to America. He also made numerous other controversial statements pertaining to race and sexual orientation, including using numerous highly offensive slurs: "If you want a business, and you put money in it, why shouldn't you be able to discriminate? It's your business... That's why I went into business, so that I could discriminate... Who's killed more blacks than anyone? The fuckin' blacks." However, in February 1993, wrestling journalist Mark Madden brought the interview to the attention of Hank Aaron, himself a vice president in the Turner organization with the Atlanta Braves, as Madden had seen Aaron conversing with Watts on a TV special. Aaron, who dealt with plenty of racial abuse in his career as an African American baseball player, particularly when he broke Babe Ruth's home run record in 1974, pushed for Watts' removal.

February 1993 saw the company decide to take management of pay per views and programming entirely out of his hands and stated that he would be part of a large booking committee. Watts left prior to SuperBrawl III. In a letter he wrote in April 1993 addressed to Aaron, Watts contended that he resigned for his own reasons from WCW while arguing his comments were taken out of context and that the interview “was in the possession of TBS executives prior to my hiring in WCW; and I had already responded to that very allegation prior to being hired.”

==== World Wrestling Federation (1995) ====
Watts later went on to a position of booking power in the World Wrestling Federation (WWF). His tenure there was short, as he stated in later interviews that he was only there on a three-month contract and had no interest in staying long-term. On April 4, 2009, Watts was inducted into the WWE Hall of Fame as a part of the Class of 2009.

== Personal life and death ==
Watts was born in Oklahoma City on May 5, 1939. He had five children. From his first marriage, he has a son, William III (nicknamed Biff), and from his second marriage, he has three sons, Joel, Erik, Micah and a daughter, Ene. In March 2006, Watts released his autobiography The Cowboy and the Cross: The Bill Watts Story: Rebellion, Wrestling and Redemption through ECW Press. The book chronicles his upbringing, his career as first a wrestler, then a promoter, along with events in his personal life.

He served as co-host of a sports talk radio show on The Sports Animal in Tulsa, Oklahoma, until late 2008. He was a longtime resident of Bixby, a Tulsa suburb.

Watts died on November 17, 2026, at the age of 87.

== Championships and accomplishments ==
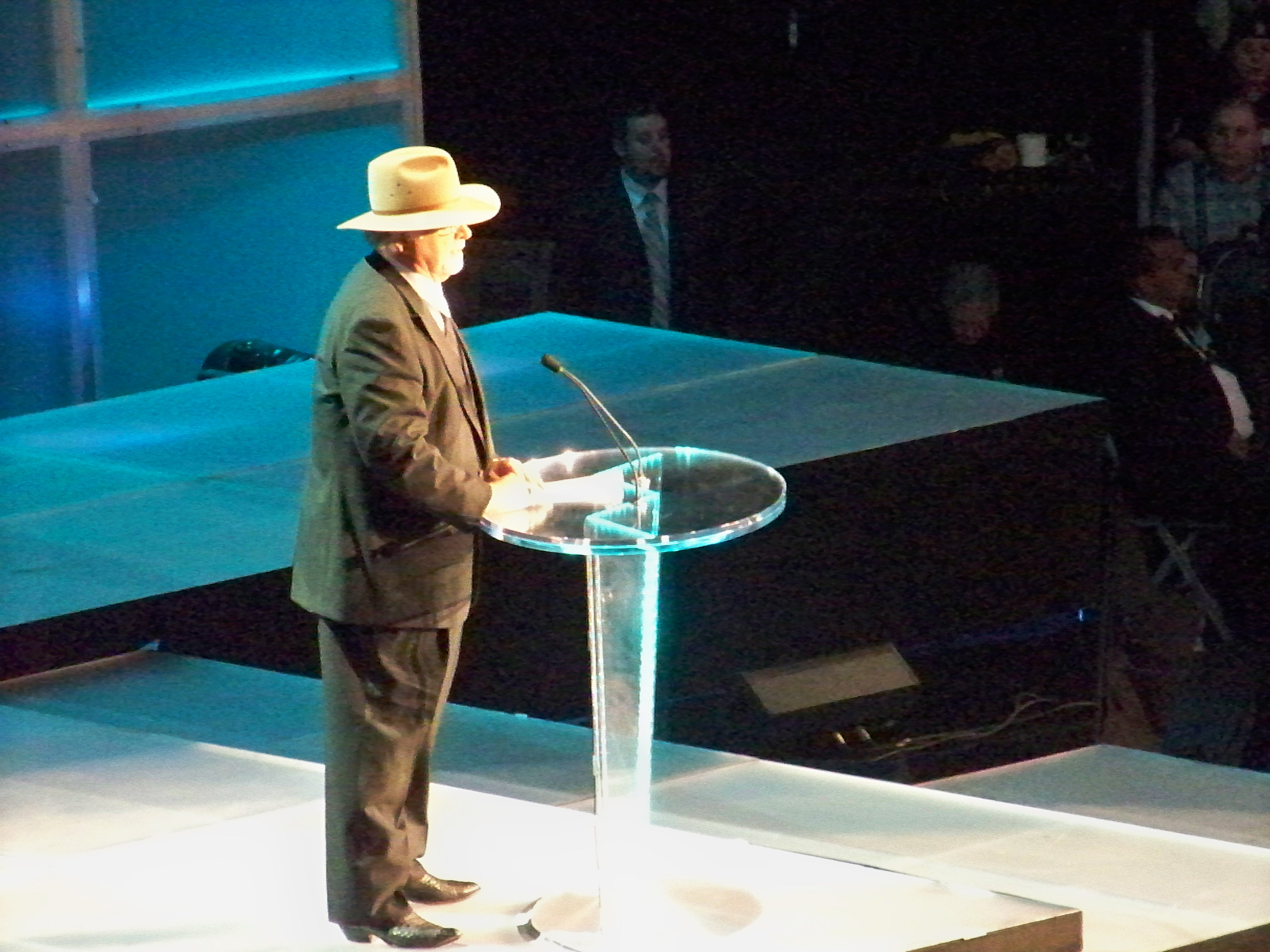
Watts being inducted into the WWE Hall of Fame in 2009.

- American Wrestling Alliance
  - AWA United States Heavyweight Championship (1 time)
- Cauliflower Alley Club
  - Other honoree (2001)
- Championship Wrestling from Florida
  - NWA Florida Heavyweight Championship (3 times)
  - NWA Southern Heavyweight Championship (Florida version) (1 time)
- George Tragos/Lou Thesz Professional Wrestling Hall of Fame
  - Class of 2013
- Gulf Coast Championship Wrestling
  - NWA Gulf Coast Heavyweight Championship (1 time)
- Japan Wrestling Association
  - NWA International Tag Team Championship (1 time) – with Tarzan Tyler
- Mid-South Sports
  - NWA Georgia Heavyweight Championship (1 time)
- NWA Tri-State / Mid-South Wrestling Association
  - Mid-South North American Heavyweight Championship (2 times)
  - Mid-South Tag Team Championship (1 time) – with Buck Robley
  - NWA Louisiana Tag Team Championship (1 time) – with Buck Robley
  - NWA North American Heavyweight Championship (Tri-State version) (7 times)
  - NWA Tri-State Brass Knuckles Championship (2 times)
  - NWA United States Tag Team Championship (Tri-State version) (5 times)– with Jerry Kozak (1), Billy Red Lyons (1), Greg Valentine (1), Billy Robinson (1) and Buck Robley (1)
- Professional Wrestling Hall of Fame
  - Class of 2013
- Southwest Sports, Inc.
  - NWA Texas Heavyweight Championship (1 time)
- World Wide Wrestling Federation / World Wrestling Entertainment
  - WWWF United States Tag Team Championship (1 time) – with Gorilla Monsoon
  - WWE Hall of Fame (Class of 2009)
- Wrestling Observer Newsletter awards
  - Most Obnoxious (1992)
  - Wrestling Observer Newsletter Hall of Fame (Class of 1996)
