= Dan Kroffat =

Canadian retired professional wrestler (born 1945)

Personal information
- Born: Daniel Kroffat; June 14, 1945 (age 81) Vancouver, British Columbia, Canada

Professional wrestling career
- Ring name(s): Dan Kroffat; King Krow
- Billed height: 6 ft 0 in (183 cm)
- Billed weight: 240 lb (109 kg)
- Billed from: Vancouver, British Columbia
- Debut: 1963
- Retired: 1985

Daniel Kroffat (born June 14, 1945) is a Canadian retired professional wrestler. He is best known for his appearances with Stampede Wrestling in the 1960s and 1970s, where he invented the ladder match.

== Professional wrestling career ==
=== Stampede Wrestling ===
Kroffat was discovered by Earl Maynard, a professional wrestler and former Mr. Universe, while working as a lifeguard in Vancouver, British Columbia. Maynard began training Kroffat before recommending Stu Hart as a trainer. Kroffat and his wife moved to Calgary, Alberta, where Kroffat trained and debuted in Hart's Stampede Wrestling promotion. Wrestling as "Cowboy" Dan Kroffat, he formed a tag team with Bill Cody and won the Stampede Wrestling International Tag Team Championship in the summer of 1971. In July 1972, Kroffat won his first Stampede North American Heavyweight Championship by defeating Tor Kamata. Kroffat and Kamata wrestled several times, and Kroffat designed a new match type for one of the encounters. A bag of money was hung from the ceiling and the two competitors fought to retrieve the bag by climbing a stepladder. The idea caught on, and subsequent matches saw Kroffat's title belt replace the money, with the stipulation that the first wrestler to retrieve the belt would be champion. The idea of a ladder match has been used ever since, as Bret Hart helped popularize the stipulation in the World Wrestling Federation (now World Wrestling Entertainment).

Over the next two years, he held both championships several times. He won the tag team title twice while teaming with Lennie Hurst and combined with Cody to win the title belts for the fourth and final time. Kroffat also engaged in a feud with Archie Gouldie in Stampede Wrestling. The pair traded the North American Heavyweight Title back and forth in a series of matches. Kroffat defeated Gouldie to win the belt in 1973, but Gouldie later regained the title. Still in that same year, Kroffat won the title back from Gouldie to begin his third reign as champion. He then feuded with Gil Hayes, who beat him to win the title. Kroffat regained the belt from Hayes but was unable to win it back after dropping it to him again.

=== National Wrestling Alliance ===
Kroffat also enjoyed success outside Stampede Wrestling. In a match that took place in Vancouver, he won the NWA United National Championship while wrestling as King Krow in 1972. He also won the Vancouver version of the NWA Canadian Tag Team Championship twice in 1974, teaming with Leo Madril and Wayne Bridges.

=== Later career ===
Back in Stampede Wrestling, Kroffat defeated his old rival Gouldie to regain the North American Heavyweight Championship. Once again, however, Gouldie won the title back later in the series of matches. He won the belt for the final time by defeating Killer Tim Brooks. After winning the belt, Kroffat retired from professional wrestling and vacated the championship. He continued to wrestle occasionally, however, until retiring for good in 1985.

=== Retirement ===
After leaving wrestling in 1985, Kroffat opened Daniel's Auto Wholesale Centre, a used car dealership. After bovine spongiform encephalopathy, also known as mad cow disease, was discovered in an Albertan cow in 2003, the United States stopped importing Canadian cattle. Due to the problems this created in the Albertan cattle industry, Kroffat led a campaign to reopen the border, gathering signatures on a petition and pressuring the Canadian federal government to help with the cause.

After Kroffat's retirement, professional wrestler Philip Lafon, who was a fan of Kroffat's, took on the ring name Dan Kroffat in his honor.

== Championships and accomplishments ==
- Canadian Wrestling Hall of Fame
  - Class of 2016
- Cauliflower Alley Club
  - Men's Wrestling Award (2011)
- NWA All-Star Wrestling
  - NWA Canadian Tag Team Championship (Vancouver version) (2 times) - with Leo Madril (1) and Wayne Bridges (1)
  - NWA United National Championship (1 time)
- Stampede Wrestling
  - NWA International Tag Team Championship (Calgary version) (4 times) - with Bill Cody (2) and Lennie Hurst (2)
  - Stampede North American Heavyweight Championship (6 times)
  - Stampede Wrestling Hall of Fame (Class of 1995)
- World Wrestling Council
  - WWC Caribbean Tag Team Championship (2 times) - with Bobby Jaggers
