= Abe Jacobs =

New Zealand–born professional wrestler (1928–2023)

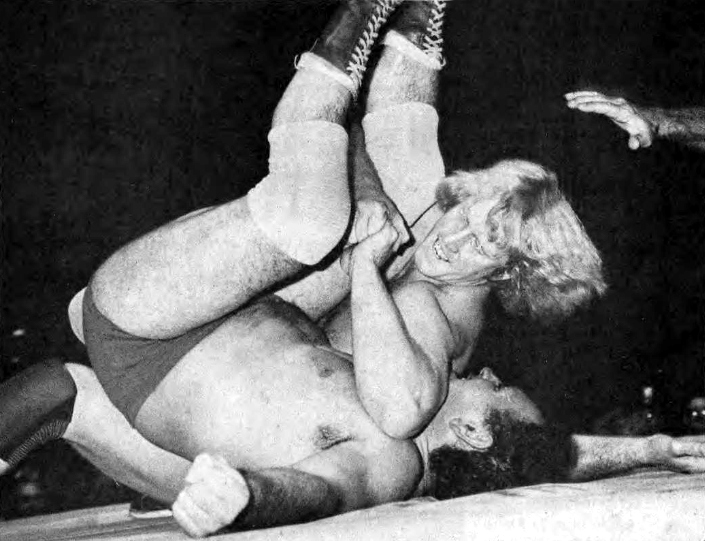
- Jacobs being pinned by David Von Erich in 1981

Personal information
- Born: Abner Robert Jacobs; 18 June 1928 Chatham Islands, New Zealand
- Died: 21 August 2023 (aged 95) Charlotte, North Carolina, U.S.

Professional wrestling career
- Ring names: Abe Jacobs; Red Pimpernel
- Billed height: 6 ft 3 in (1.91 m)
- Billed weight: 230 lb (100 kg)
- Billed from: Wellington, New Zealand
- Trained by: The Zebra Kid
- Debut: 1958
- Retired: 1981

Abner Robert Jacobs (18 June 1928 – 21 August 2023) was a New Zealand professional wrestler. He was one of the first men to follow fellow New Zealander Pat O'Connor to the United States where, like O'Connor, Jacobs became a major star in the National Wrestling Alliance during the "Golden Age of Wrestling". One of the most recognisable "babyfaces" during this period, he was billed as the "Jewish Heavyweight Champion" and wrestled in a number of high-profile matches with many stars of the era including numerous bouts against NWA World Heavyweight Champions Lou Thesz, Gene Kiniski, Buddy Rogers, Dick Hutton and Pat O'Connor. His bout against O'Connor in 1961, which aired on Capitol Wrestling's weekly television show, was the first time two New Zealanders wrestled for a championship title on foreign soil.

Jacobs was also an established journeyman wrestler, touring Europe and Japan on several occasions, travelling around the world four times and wrestling over 8,000 matches in his 30-year career. Although never reaching the heights of O'Connor as a singles wrestler, he was very successful as a "tag team specialist" winning the NWA Florida-version of the NWA World Tag Team Championship with Don Curtis, the NWA Los Angeles International Television Tag Team Championship with Haystacks Calhoun, and the NWA Western States Tag Team Championship with Pez Whatley. Other partners included George Becker, Antonino Rocca, Sailor Art Thomas, Klondike Bill, Man Mountain Mike and "Coloured Heavyweight Champion" Luther Lindsay.

Jacobs spent the final years of his career in the Carolinas where he became a mainstay for Jim Crockett's NWA Mid-Atlantic Championship Wrestling during the 1970s and early-1980s. Best remembered by "modern" American wrestling fans as an undercard wrestler, he was the first opponent of "The Nature Boy" Ric Flair when making his debut in the promotion in 1974. Flair's victory over an established veteran such as Jacobs was a critical step in his early career and is partially credited for helping Flair become a major star in the Mid-Atlantic territory.

During his 10-year career in the amateur ranks, Jacobs won seven provincial titles, was a runner-up to the nationals and a winner of the national championships. Jacobs is credited for creating the "Kiwi Leg Roll", a modified amateur submission hold, which was especially popular among fans and to date has never been duplicated. He was also widely respected in the industry, managing Ricky Steamboat's gym during the 1990s, and was officially inducted into the George Tragos/Lou Thesz Hall of Fame in 2008. Although he was not as well known in his native country in his professional career, Jacobs was named one of the "Top Ten New Zealand Born Wrestlers" by Fight Times Magazine, and was also featured on a special commemorative edition of the New Zealand ten-dollar note.

== Early life and amateur career ==
Abner Robert Jacobs was born on 18 April 1928, on the isolated Chatham Islands in New Zealand, where he was also raised. His father managed a cattle station with 6,000 head of sheep and a few thousand cattle. Jacobs had a very rural upbringing working on the station and regularly travelled long distances by horseback; he once rode 85 miles in a two-day ride. At the age of 13, Jacobs broke his first horse and herded 1200 head of sheep on a three-day trip to be shipped to the mainland, and began training sheep dogs. He also attended a local elementary school and completed high school via a correspondence course. He saw his first automobile as a young man in Christchurch and his first television set while competing in Hawaii years later.

In the late-1940s, he became interested in professional wrestling while listening to live radio broadcasts, aired twice a week by the Dominion Wrestling Union, and reading the local newspapers. He was once able to hear a match between Gorgeous George and George Temple being broadcast in San Diego for 20 minutes before the signal faded. He would later have the opportunity to wrestle many of these wrestlers while competing professionally in the United States.

Jacobs began weightlifting which, in addition to working on his family's ranch, would give him a distinct strength advantage when he started his amateur wrestling career as a teenager. Although conventional wisdom discouraged weight training at the time, then believed that becoming "muscle bound" would slow speed and agility, Jacobs continued working out after reading a magazine article which claimed that the fastest Olympian was an Egyptian lightweight power lifter. He was invited to an Easter Camp, where amateur wrestlers had the opportunity to train with the 1952 light heavyweight Olympic Champion, but was forced to leave by the head of the wrestling association for his weightlifting.

Despite this setback, he eventually won three Canterbury Provincial Titles, four Wellington Provincial Titles and runner-up silver medalist in the New Zealand Nationals. Jacobs later won the New Zealand Championship and held the title until 1953 when he was defeated by John da Silva in Wellington. He also tried out for the 1956 Olympics but lost to another wrestler by one point.

== Professional career ==
=== Early career (1958–1959) ===
After the Olympic trials, Jacobs decided to wrestle as a professional and was trained by The Zebra Kid. He was assisted by Al Costello, whom he trained with as an amateur, and future tag team partner Don Curtis. Jacobs made his professional debut against his trainer, the Zebra Kid, in Hastings in 1958; substituting for George McKay, their match served as the main event. It was during this match that he debuted his trademark submission hold, the "Kiwi Roll", which was covered by local newspapers the following day. After wrestling nearly a dozen matches for the New Zealand Wrestling Union, among his opponents being Ricky Waldo, Tony Olivas, Dick Hrstich, Andre Drapp, Fred Wright and Jack Bence, he was brought over to the United States where he worked for promoter Al Karasick in Hawaii. This was one of the most popular territories to work for at the time due to its high salaries, little travel time and, due to the promotion running only three shows a week, there was generally plenty of recreational time.

=== Capitol Sports and Jim Crockett Promotions (1958–1965) ===
Three months later, he arrived in the continental United States and spent a year for Vince McMahon, Sr. in Capitol Sports, then based in Washington D.C., and began appearing on their weekly television show in 1958. As one of their up-and-coming "babyfaces", Jacobs was billed as the "Jewish Heavyweight Champion". He took on the promotion's top "heel" NWA United States Heavyweight Champion "Nature Boy" Buddy Rogers that same year which saw Haystacks Calhoun interfere in the match. The match was recorded on kinescope and, later featured on Wrestling's Greatest Villains of the Golden Era, is one of the oldest surviving matches from that era. Jacobs met Buddy Rogers on eight occasions during his career, the majority for the United States Championship, and at least once for the NWA World Heavyweight Championship.

On 23 February 1959, Jacobs made his debut at its home arena at Madison Square Garden in New York City appearing on the undercard against kayfabe Nazi sympathizer Karl Von Hess defeating him via disqualification. His feud with Von Hess caused some controversy when, during a pre-match interview with announcer Ray Morgan, Von Hess said that Jacobs' family "better start saying the Kaddish" (Jewish Prayer for the Dead); his threatening words generated telephone calls, hate mail and resulted in a probe by the Federal Bureau of Investigation. He later scored victories over Kenny Ackles, Johnny Valentine, The Sheik, "Wild" Bull Curry and Dr. Jerry Graham. He also briefly teamed with Antonino Rocca and together fought Dr. Jerry & Eddie Graham. In January 1960, Jacobs faced Bruno Sammartino who later became the promotion's top star for over a decade.

Shortly afterwards, Jacobs began touring in other parts of the United States and in Canada where he won the NWA North American Championship in North Bay. On 28 February 1961, he wrestled then NWA World Heavyweight Champion Pat O'Connor at Sunnyside Garden in Queens, New York. This was not only the first meeting between the two men but was the first time two New Zealanders wrestled for a championship title in a foreign country. This match later aired on Capitol Wrestling's TV show however, unlike his bout with Rogers, no known footage survives of this match. On 5 July of that year, Jacobs wrestled also Rogers for the NWA World title in Norfolk, Virginia. The two wrestled for 55 minutes before Jacobs fell from the ring after missing a flying tackle and injured his shoulder. Jacobs also wrestled in Detroit and Chicago and, while in the latter city, he took part in the first Comiskey Park show wrestling "Rubberman" Johnny Walker in front of 36,000 fans.

When Jim Crockett, Sr. was looking for outside talent, Jacobs was recommended by McMahon and brought into Jim Crockett Promotions in early 1961. His first run in the territory lasted a year and a half during which time he wrestled Swede Hanson and teamed with George Becker and Haystack Calhoun. He also teamed with The Flying Scotts (George & Sandy Scott) in 6-man tag team matches. In later years, Crockett paired him with other "big men" such as Sailor Art Thomas, Klondike Bill and Man Mountain Mike. Jacobs eventually left the Mid-Atlantic area for the West Coast to team with Haystack Calhoun in the fall of 1962. Together they won the NWA Los Angeles International Television Tag Team Championship from Sir Alan Garfield & Karl Von Schober on 31 October, and lost the titles to The Destroyer and Don Manoukian the following month. Though he returned to the Carolinas afterwards, Jacobs continued to travel throughout the United States and elsewhere for much of his career.

In between wrestling for Crockett, he won the NWA North American Championship in North Bay, Canada. On 5 May 1964, he and Don Curtis defeated Hiro Matsuda & Duke Keomuka in Tampa, Florida, to win the NWA World Tag Team Championship in NWA Florida. The two held the titles for over a month before losing the belts to Chris & John Tolos in Jacksonville. In late 1964, he and Curtis competed in a 10-man tag team tournament held by promoter Cowboy Luttrell in Tampa and Miami to earn a title shot against to meet Eddie Graham & Sam Steamboat for the NWA Florida Tag Team Championship. The other four teams included Tarzan Tyler & Joe McCarthy, Tony Marino & Steve Bolus, The Russian Wolfmen, and The Executioners. Jacobs and Curtis defeated The Russian Wolfmen to advance to the finals where they lost to The Executioners. Jacobs also challenged several NWA World Heavyweight Champions during the mid-to-late 1960s. On 11 February 1965, he took on Lou Thesz in front of over 2,500 fans at the Norfolk Arena. This match was a best two out of three falls match and lasted nearly 30 minutes with Thesz taking the first and third falls. Their match also received significant coverage from local media, most notably, The Virginian-Pilot. Jacobs again faced Thesz in Richmond on 5 November 1965.

=== Travels around the world (1966–1981) ===
Like many New Zealand wrestlers, Jacobs also competed internationally during this period wrestling in 25 different countries and travelling around the world four times. In 1966, Jacobs travelled to Japan where he wrestled as the masked wrestler Red Pimpernel. He returned to Japan three or four times and, as a "heel" wrestler, was a frequent opponent of Antonio Inoki. These matches were very popular with Japanese audiences and, according to Jacobs, he was once hit with an umbrella by a fan during one of their bouts. As Red Pimpernel, he wrestled Lou Thesz for the NWA World Championship there as well. He also spent time in most of Southeast Asia, Australasia, South America, and Europe. Though he spent the majority of his time in the United States, Jacobs was much more financially successful when wrestling internationally. In South Africa, for example, he received 25% of the gate as well as a winner/loser purse.

As in Japan, South African promoters used heavyweight wrestlers and had strict weight requirements. Jacobs usually weighed around 250 pounds during his career, but had increased to around 270 pounds for his tour. On his way to South Africa, he had a case of food poisoning from a Chinese restaurant in India and his weight had dropped to 240 by the time he arrived.

On the day of his arrival in South Africa, Jacobs was unexpectedly picked up by a promoter from his Johannesburg hotel and brought before the South Africa Wrestling Commission. Though he had previously sent publicity information, pictures and other promotional material, he was required to wrestle in front of the athletic commission before he could receive a licence. Despite travel fatigue and the high altitude (Johannesburg being 6,000 feet above sea level) Jacobs defeated three different wrestlers.

The promoter, Bull Heffer, was upset upon seeing Jacobs and had believed he lied about his weight. Heffer was also concerned about putting Jacobs against the South African Champion, a near super heavyweight, since Jacobs looked so small in comparison. Two weeks after meeting with the South Africa Wrestling Commission, while wrestling in Pretoria, he and other wrestlers were weighed by the promoter. Jacobs, then wrestling with a "heel" cowboy in-ring persona, secretly put weights in his pockets and cowboy boots in order to pass the weight requirements.

Jacobs drew particular ire from South African wrestling fans when, shortly before his upcoming match with the South African Champion, he confessed in a newspaper interview he did not even know the name of his opponent. Around this time, Jacobs and several other wrestlers were attending a rugby game in Johannesburg when, while wearing his cowboy hat, he was recognised by the crowd. Many of the 10,000 people in attendance began chanting "Hey Yankee – Go Home" and soon began pelting him with oranges. He and the other wrestlers were eventually forced to leave the stadium, however, Jacobs decided to change his clothes and, putting on a friend's jacket and baseball cap, he and the other wrestlers returned to the stadium and watched the rest of the game undisturbed.

Returning to North America between his overseas trips, Jacobs wrestled throughout Canada as well as the United States. In the former country, his travels took him to the Maritimes, Montreal, Toronto, Vancouver, and Ontario. Once in Nova Scotia, Jacobs was challenged by a disruptive wrestling fan who had been harassing wrestlers and the crowd alike. At one point, this fan had to be escorted from the building after entering the ring and using the house microphone to taunt the wrestlers. After breaking into the locker room to confront the wrestlers, the promoter agreed to pay Jacobs to wrestle the fan. Jacobs was easily able to put the man in a submission hold during their match and made the fan apologise to the crowd before releasing the hold. While in Nova Scotia, Jacobs teamed with and, at least on one occasion, wrestled another fellow New Zealander, Steve Rickard, while in Halifax, and later reunited in the Carolinas years later.

He also travelled to Australia where he wrestled for World Championship Wrestling. On one tour, he wrestled every night he was there and appeared on three televised shows in Brisbane, Sydney, and Melbourne. While in the Pacific, he made occasional appearances in New Zealand for promoter Ernie Pinches, where he teamed with popular Samoan wrestler Tau Paa Paa, and later in Steve Rickard's All Star Pro-Wrestling near the end of his career.

=== Later career in NWA Mid-Atlantic Championship Wrestling (1965–1983) ===
Throughout his career, Jacobs maintained a very heavy ring schedule regularly wrestling five or six matches a week. With the exception of 10-minute televised bouts, his average matches lasted at least 30 minutes with many going over an hour. He travelled an average of around 3,000 miles per week and headlined cards with some of the top wrestlers in Canada and North America including Lou Newman, "Big" Bill Miller, Buddy Rogers, Dick the Bruiser, Ray Stevens, Hans Schmidt, "Whipper" Billy Watson and Wilbur Snyder. He also met a number of NWA World Heavyweight Champions during this period including Gene Kiniski, Dick Hutton, Buddy Rogers and Dory Funk, Jr. during the mid-to late 1960s.

One of the reasons Jacobs was able to eventually immigrate to the United States was because he was wrestling at a "World Championship" level. When Jacobs competed in the US, he was under a work visa which limited his time wrestling in the country. There were times when would be unable to compete in the country at all due to national origins quotas set by the United States Immigration and Naturalization Service. With the passage of the Immigration Act of 1965, Jacobs was able to apply for permanent residence and eventual citizenship. As part of the application process, he was required to show that he was not taking any work away from US citizens and, meeting with the Immigration and Labor Department, he presented to immigration officials proof with posters advertising himself wrestling Lou Thesz for the World Title in Miami in 1964.

For much of the 1960s and early 1970s, Jacobs headlined shows for Jim Crockett's NWA Mid-Atlantic Championship Wrestling. By this time in his career, Jacobs was well known as a "tag team specialist", the territory being known as a "hotbed" for tag teams at the time, having teamed with Sailor Art Thomas, Klondike Bill and Man Mountain Mike and faced teams such as Aldo Bogni & Bronco Lubich and Atlantic Coast Tag Team Champions Rip Hawk & Swede Hanson (managed by General Homer O'Dell). One of his most favourite tag team partners during this period was Luther Lindsay who, similar to Jacobs, was once billed as the "Coloured (or Negro) Heavyweight Champion". They feuded with the masked tag team The Infernos with manager Jimmy Dykes, one of their matches nearly selling out the Dorton Arena in Raleigh, North Carolina, as well as the Minnesota Wrecking Crew (Gene & Ole Anderson) during the late 1960s. The two were ranked #15 of the top 20 tag teams in the world by Ring Wrestling in December 1968.

Within a few years, however, Jacobs began cutting back on his ring schedule, making his last Japanese tour in 1973, and settled down in the Carolinas, where he purchased a horse ranch, and wrestled primarily for Jim Crockett for the rest of his career. Crockett's promotion, NWA Mid-Atlantic Championship Wrestling, was one of the major territories of the decade and where he had started early in his career. After George Scott took over as booker, he was used as an undercard wrestler and faced younger up-and-coming wrestlers. In May 1974, Jacobs was the first opponent of "The Nature Boy" Ric Flair during his first run in the territory, defeating him at the Charlotte Coliseum, and wrestled tag team matches against Flair and Rip Hawk with a number of different partners. Flair's victory over Jacobs, then an established veteran, was partially credited for the young wrestler's early success in the promotion and his eventually becoming one of its biggest stars during the next decade. Though he had been a popular wrestler in the territory while wrestling for Crockett, Jacobs was of the few older veterans who did not win any titles. However, he did win the NWA Western States Tag Team Championship with "Pistol" Pez Whatley in Amarillo, Texas, two years later.

In the summer and fall of 1975, Jacobs wrestled for promoter Fritz Von Erich's World Class Championship Wrestling where he faced Steve Strong, Skip Young, John Tolos, Mike Paidousis, Hans Schroeder, Bruiser Blackwell, Buddy Wolfe, and Red Bastien. That same year, he wrestled Superstar Billy Graham at the Greensboro Coliseum on 3 April 1975. In Georgia, Jacobs feuded with another young wrestler, Randy Savage, during the summer of 1977. During one of these meetings, he and Roberto Soto defeated Savage and Bill Howard in a tag team match at the Atlanta City Auditorium on 3 June 1977. He was also brought to Maple Leaf Wrestling by Toronto promoter Frank Tunney where, on 22 October 1978, he fought British wrestler Geoff Portz to a lime-limit draw at the Maple Leaf Gardens. When George Scott left for the World Wrestling Federation in 1981, Ole Anderson took over as head booker for the promotion. Due to personal differences with Anderson, Jacobs was no longer booked in the territory.

Jacobs spent the rest of the year wrestling for promoter Paul Jones in Georgia Championship Wrestling where he took on such foes as The Masked Superstar and "Iron" Mike Sharpe, and teamed with Ted Oates and George Welles. On 5 September edition of Georgia Championship Wrestling (1971–1982) on WTBS where he and Ken Hall unsuccessfully challenged NWA National Tag Team Champions Jimmy Snuka & Terry Gordy. He also worked in Florida Championship Wrestling. One of his last matches in the United States was against David Von Erich in Miami on 16 December 1981, and made appearances for Steve Rickard's All Star Pro-Wrestling in New Zealand, before retiring that same year. By the end of his career, he had wrestled in over 8,000 matches in 25 different countries.

Jacobs briefly came out of retirement for the first nine months of 1983 and wrestled a number of opponents including "Wild" Bill White, Ken Timbs, Masa Fuchi, Ricky Harris, Kelly Kiniski, The Magic Dragon, and John Bonello. On 9 April 1983, he and Mike Davis wrestled The Great Kabuki in a handicap match. He also took part in tag team matches with Mark Fleming and Glen Lane against Frank Monte & Jim Dalton and Masa Fuchi & Ricky Harris respectively. His last match was against John Bonello at the Memorial Auditorium in Greenville, South Carolina, on 19 September 1983.

=== Post-retirement ===
In the years following his retirement, Jacobs remained in North Carolina and managed several gyms including Ricky Steamboat's facility in Charlotte. While living in Charlotte, he also made occasional visits to his family ranch in New Zealand. On 20 May 1995, he was one of several legendary wrestlers in attendance for Smoky Mountain Wrestling's "Carolina Memories" supercard at the Grady Cole Center including Mr. Wrestling, Nelson Royal, Swede Hanson, Johnny Weaver, Magnum T. A. and ex-referee Tommy Young. While looking after Steamboat's gym, Jacobs was contacted by the manager of Abe Jacobs, Jr., an independent wrestler then competing on the local "indy circuit", who invited him to be in his corner in an upcoming match in Asheville. She later brought Abe Jacobs, Jr. to the gym and wanted him to teach her wrestler how to perform the "Kiwi Leg Roll" finisher. Jacobs declined both offers.

Jacobs later began spending time between Charlotte and New Zealand where he bought a sheep and cattle ranch in the Chatham Islands. He has been involved in a number of local charity events, especially charity golf tournaments, organised by retired NFL players Roman Gabriel and Brad Johnson. In 1999, he was featured on a special commemorative edition of the New Zealand ten-dollar note by the Chatham Islands Note Corporation for the Millennium.

Jacobs was also recognised by the internet wrestling community in the early 21st century. In January 2004, arranged via George South, Jacobs was interviewed by MidAtlanticGateway.com where he discussed both his amateur and professional career. In December 2007, he was interviewed by SLAM! Sports. As well as discussing his career, Jacobs stated that he no longer watches professional wrestling, partly due to being unfamiliar with most of the current stars, as well as commenting on the dangerous risks wrestler's take in regards to modern hardcore wrestling warning that "no one can get away with such a style and walk away without incurring serious injuries". Jacobs also talked about the end of the television era and the dominance of World Wrestling Entertainment in professional wrestling. In recent years, he has also been interviewed by Wrestling Perspective Newsletter and often made appearances at legend's reunions and conventions such as the annual Cauliflower Alley Club.

In February 2008, Jacobs was among the Mid-Atlantic territorial wrestlers and wrestling personalities who attended the funeral of Johnny Weaver including Ivan Koloff, Sandy Scott, Wally and Don Kernodle, Rene Goulet, Nikita Koloff, Tony Romano, Bill White, Jim Nelson, Belle Starr, Jim Holiday, Rick McCord, George South, Mike Weddle, Penny Banner, wrestling broadcasters Bob Caudle and Rich Landrum, referees Tommy Young and Stu Schwartz, and a promoter Jackie Crockett. He had also been in attendance for the funeral of Mr. Wrestling several years earlier, and quoted in The Post and Courier upon the deaths of George Becker, Sailor Art Thomas, Bronco Lubich and Sandy Scott.

Four months later, Jacobs was honoured by the Dan Gable International Wrestling Institute and Museum and officially inducted into the George Tragos/Lou Thesz Hall of Fame along with Roddy Piper, Masanouri Saito, Penny Banner, Stu Hart, Ray Gunkel, and Leo Nomellini in a special ceremony held in Waterloo, Iowa. Bob Leonard wrote in a later editorial that Jacobs "proved to be a vibrant speaker, and a personable addition to the great social atmosphere of the event". In March 2009, he was named one of "Top Ten New Zealand Born Wrestlers" by Fight Times Magazine.

== Personal life and death ==
After retirement, Jacobs and his wife resided in Charlotte, North Carolina. Abe Jacobs died on 21 August 2023, at the age of 95.

== The "Kiwi Leg Roll" ==
The Kiwi Leg Roll, or simply the Kiwi Roll, is a professional wrestling submission hold which was created by Abe Jacobs and used as his finisher throughout his career. It was developed by Jacobs during his amateur wrestling days, while working out in the gym, and first used it against his former trainer The Zebra Kid in his debut match in 1958. This move was later covered in by local newspapers the following day and, wrestling in the United States years later, by the American media.

Though little footage exists of Jacobs performing the move, it has been described as a modified figure four leglock in which he would grab an opponent's leg, like the said hold, and roll the man around the mat in an almost circular motion putting pressure across the ankle and causing his opponent to submit. Jacobs never revealed how to perform the Kiwi Leg Roll despite being asked by dozens of wrestlers, claiming in later interviews that he had forgotten how, and to date it has rarely been duplicated. Its uniqueness was very popular among fans of the television era and Jacobs has since long remained associated with the hold.

== Championships and accomplishments ==
=== Amateur wrestling ===
- Seven provincial championship titles
- Runner-up silver medalist in the New Zealand Nationals
- Winner in the New Zealand Championship

=== Professional wrestling ===
- George Tragos/Lou Thesz Professional Wrestling Hall of Fame
  - Class of 2008
- National Wrestling Alliance
  - NWA North American Championship (one time)
- NWA Florida
  - NWA World Tag Team Championship (Florida version) (one time) – with Don Curtis
- NWA Los Angeles
  - NWA Los Angeles International Television Tag Team Championship (one time) – with Haystacks Calhoun
- Western States Sports
  - NWA Western States Tag Team Championship (2 times) – with Pez Whatley

== See also ==
- List of Jewish professional wrestlers
