= John Bilbo (wrestler) =

Professional wrestler in the US

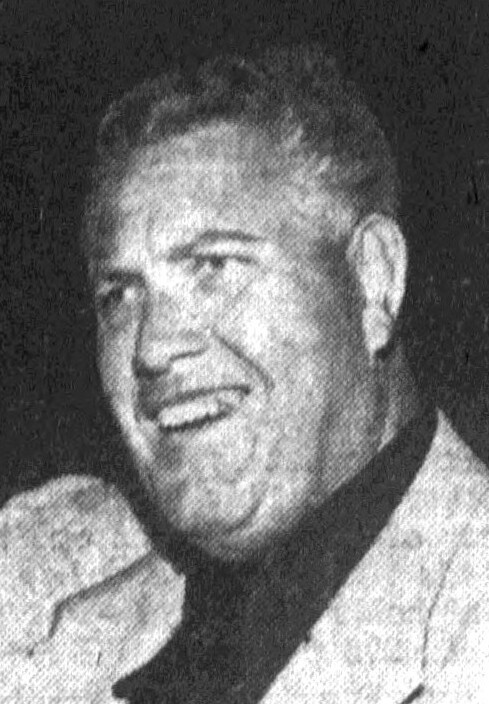
- Bilbo in 1951

Personal information
- Born: John Ralph Bilbo; January 22, 1906 De Queen, Arkansas, U.S.
- Died: May 13, 1975 (aged 69)
- Spouses: Betty L. Mast (m. 1928–1950); Ramona Rae Roten (m. 1951–1975)
- Children: 2

Professional wrestling career
- Ring names: Jules Strongbow.; Julius Strongbow
- Billed height: 6 ft 4 in (193 cm)
- Billed weight: 285 lb (129 kg)
- Debut: 1931
- Retired: 1948

John Ralph "Buster" Bilbo (January 22, 1906 – May 13, 1975), better known by the ring name Jules Strongbow, was an American professional wrestler, wrestling promoter and commentator, actor and sporting venue owner. He was a key figure in the Los Angeles wrestling territory as a booker and promoter in the 1950s and 1960s. In 1959, Strongbow co-founded the North American Wrestling Alliance with Cal and Aileen Eaton and is credited for creating some of its biggest stars.

== Early life ==
Bilbo was born in De Queen, Arkansas, on January 22, 1906, the only son of Hattie Catherine (née Burt; 1888–1962) and William Edward Bilbo (1883–1966). Promoted as a full-blooded Cherokee Indian during his wrestling career, he actually had 3/8ths Cherokee ancestry. Bilbo grew up alongside his younger sister Mary DeWanda (1913–1955) in Shawnee, Oklahoma Bilbo married his first wife, Betty Mast, on March 5, 1928, in Tecumseh, Oklahoma. John was employed as a lumberman and lived in Seminole County and Oklahoma City, Oklahoma prior to becoming a professional wrestler.

== Professional wrestling career ==
=== Early career ===
About 1931 he started using the name Jules Strongbow. Wrestlingdata.com details Jules (Julius) Strongbow in over 1200 professional wrestling matches, his debut match 2 Dec 1931 at Columbus where he was defeated by Ray Richards. On September 8, 1932, Strongbow was battling Dutch Heffner at the Hollywood Legion Stadium with Groucho Marx sitting at ringside. At one point in the match, Strongbow threw Heffner over the top rope and his opponent landed on the lap of Marx's female guest. Strongbow claimed years later on You Bet Your Life that Marx stood up and said "Mr. Strongbow, Mr. Heffner, I'd like you to meet my friend Miss Brown". His last match 23 Jun 1948 at Los Angeles when he defeated, Jack Holland. At the peak of his professional wrestling he would have a match every 2 or 3 days.

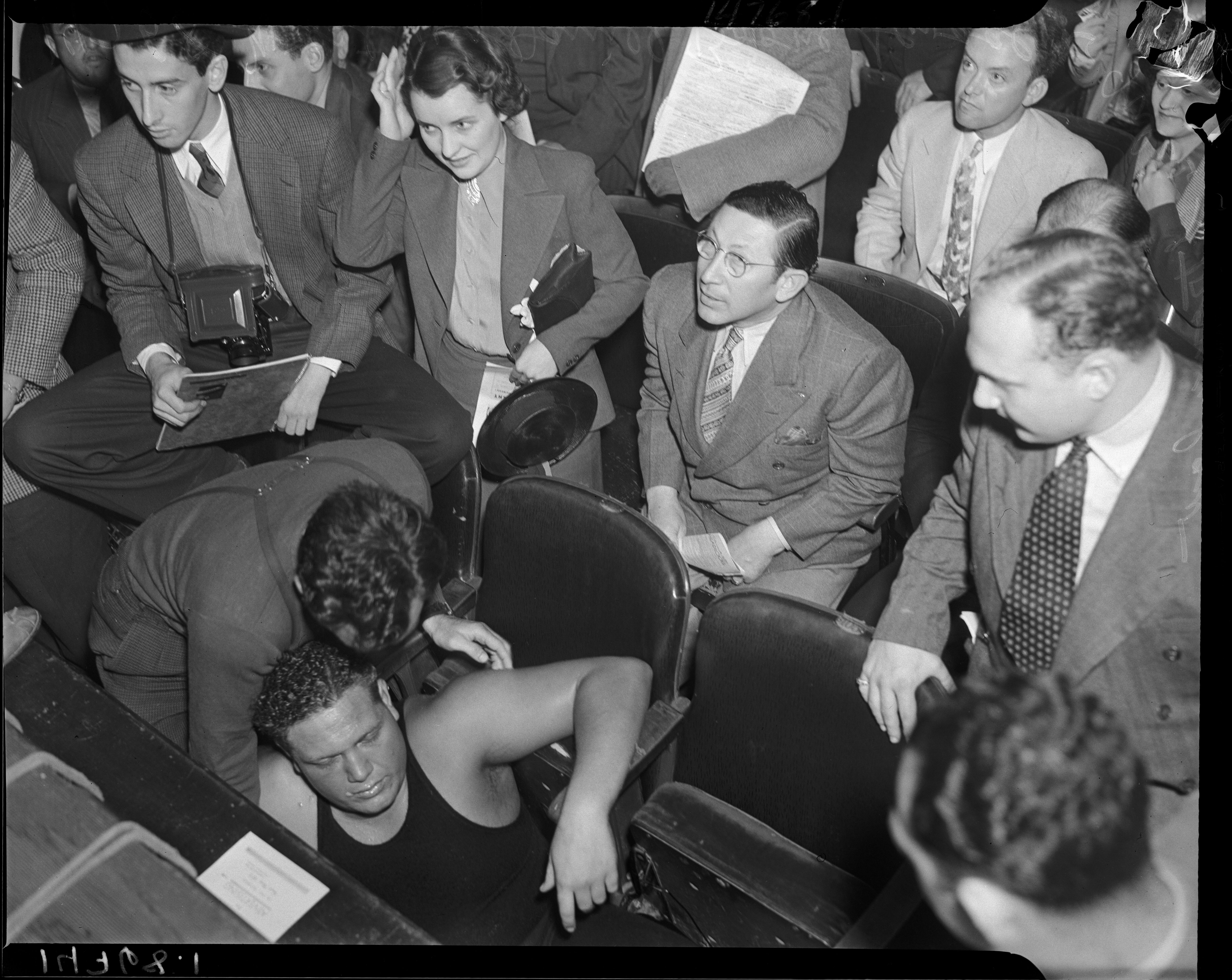
Strongbow is knocked out of the ring during a wrestling match at the Grand Olympic Auditorium on May 16, 1937.

Jules was primarily a singles wrestler but he was also part of several tag teams, Rebel Russell being just one of his many partnerships. Other notable partners included Rudy LaDitzi, Dutch Hefner, Wee Willie Davis, Tiny Roebuck and Killer Karl Davis. Strongbow became the matchmaker for the Olympic Auditorium in 1937, a position he would hold for 38 years. One of his bouts at the Grand Olympic Auditorium, on October 11, 1939, recorded footage of one of the 45 matches with the opponent he fought more than anyone else, Hardy Kruskamp.

Strongbow continued working as a pro wrestler leading up to the 1940s. Dubbed the "Cherokee Choker", Strongbow was counted among the top performers in the Los Angeles territory during the war years along with Gino Garibaldi, the four Dusek family brothers Emil, Ernie, Joe and Rudy, Wee Willie Davis, George Zaharias, Steve Casey and Baron Michele Leone. He was also the opponent for ex-boxer Primo Carnera in his pro wrestling debut. Strongbow, who then weighed about 350, was the biggest opponent Camera had ever faced at that point.

=== Texas Heavyweight Champion ===
Strongbow took the title from Hans Schnabel, 11 May 1945 at City Auditorium, Houston, Texas by winning his 2 out of 3 falls match. 14 May 1945 at the North Side Coliseum in Fort Worth, Texas he defended his title against Roy Graham, winning by 2 falls to 0. 15 May 1945 at the Municipal Auditorium in San Antonio, Texas he defended his title, the rematch against Hans Schnabel ending without a winner as a time limit draw (20 minutes). 18 May 1945, back at the City Auditorium, he was defeated by Bobby Managoff by disqualification.

=== Wrestling promoter and sports agent ===
By the 1950s, Strongbow was working full-time as a sports agent for the National Wrestling Alliance's Los Angeles booking office and was an integral part of the California Combine. As well as announcing matches, he was a matchmaker, sports agent, booker, ringside commentator and promoter. Some early highlights included serving as guest emcee for a tribute show honoring one of his old tag team partners, Tiny Roebuck, at the Wilmington Bowl on November 28, 1950. In September 1952, Strongbow reportedly prevented a near-riot at the Olympic after Killer Karl Davis and Mr. Moto defeated Rito Romero and Vincent Lopez in the main event. After a 15-minute protest by the 7,000 fans present, he was able to calm down the crowd by promising to hold a rematch the following week.

Starting as an interviewer on KTLA's "Wrestling from Hollywood" with Dick Lane, Strongbow became a regular host for the promotion's syndicated TV programing throughout the 1950s. He also co-hosted "Main Event Wrestling from Hollywood Legion Stadium" with Bill Welsh. In early 1953, Strongbow took part in a widely publicized 3-month weight loss campaign. Then weighing 377 pounds, Strongbow aimed to lose a pound every day using diet pills for a period of 90 days. In addition to KTLA keeping audiences updated on his progress, Strongbow also participated in public weigh-ins at popular drug stores such as Sav-On Drugs and Thriftys. Strongbow's efforts were especially popular with wrestling fans, resulting in high ratings on the weekly Hollywood Legion broadcasts. The final night of Strongbow's 90-day campaign was celebrated at the Hollywood Legion Stadium on May 25, 1953. Strongbow was successful in keeping the weight off and reported he was 291 pounds in a follow-up by the San Bernardino Sun two years later.

In 1954, Strongbow began hosting "Championship Wrestling" from the Hollywood Legion Stadium. Created by California Combine promoter Hugh Nichols, it was broadcast on CBS and was one of the last live pro wrestling shows to air on a national U.S. network during the "Golden Age of Wrestling". "Championship Wrestling" was seen on 103 stations across the country and had an estimated worth of $5 million. Although a six-year deal had been signed, CBS cancelled the show after 13 weeks when Nichols failed to find a sponsor to pay for the weekly $70,000 production costs

TV footage produced by the American Sports Network 1954, May 24, Main Event Wrestling from Hollywood Legion Stadium, has ringside commentator Jules 'Mr Wrestling' Strongbow and Bill Welsh; wrestlers Bill Cody V honest John Cretoria, Jack McDonald V Dave Levin, Joe Pazandak V Juan Sepeda and a Tag Match, Lord Layton and Lord Blears V Juan Szabo and Billy Varga

On July 10, 1954, Strongbow was made honorary mayor of Sepulveda, California. A number of film and TV stars attended the celebration including Roy Rogers, Edward Arnold and Eddie Dean. An additional ceremony was held to present Strongbow with his badge of office three months later. Strongbow was a guest star on the April 26, 1956 edition of You Bet Your Life with Groucho Marx. Strongbow also appeared with Tiny Roebuck and Killer Karl Davis, the latter having recently become a born-again Christian, at the Church of the Open Door for a Youth for Christ rally in June 1956.

On February 14, 1959, a tribute show was held at the San Bernardino Arena to honor Strongbow's "silver anniversary" in pro wrestling. The main event featured Chief Big Heart battling Mr. Moto in a Best 2-out-of-3 Falls match. Ten years later, promoter Mike LeBell held the "Parade of Champions" supercard in celebration of Strongbow's 35th year as matchmaker for the Olympic Auditorium. The show was headlined by Giant Baba defending the NWA International Heavyweight Championship against Gorilla Monsoon and NWA Americas Heavyweight Champion Mil Mascaras versus NWA Southern Heavyweight Champion Buddy Fuller in a champion vs. champion match.

=== North American Wrestling Alliance ===
The Los Angeles booking office was one of several NWA territories that decided to leave the organization following the controversial 1957 title dispute between NWA World Heavyweight Champion Lou Thesz and Édouard Carpentier in Montreal, Quebec. The California Combine continued to recognize Carpentier as world champion. Strongbow still maintained a good relationship with Thesz, however, and co-promoted an overseas tour of Australia with Thesz as NWA World Champion in August–October 1957, and continued booking him in Los Angeles after the world champion broke away from the NWA. Strongbow eventually co-founded the North American Wrestling Alliance (later known as Worldwide Wrestling Associates) with Cal and Aileen Eaton. On June 12, 1961, Carpentier lost a match to Freddie Blassie which created the NAWA World Heavyweight Championship.

During this period, Strongbow used his influence to keep the promotional war between NWA San Francisco and Big Time Wrestling from spreading to southern California. He was able to mediate a resolution between NWA promoter Joe Malcewicz and his "outlaw" rival Roy Shire. By negotiating a working agreement between all parties, this prevented the situation from getting violent as a similar war in Texas a few years earlier had resulted in the famed Dallas Sportatorium being set on fire by arsonists.

After Malcewicz retired, Strongbow forged ties with the Japanese Wrestling Association and brought Rikidozan to the U.S. to feud with then WWA World Heavyweight Champion Freddie Blassie. He is also credited for creating The Destroyer in 1962 and helping establish him as a star in Japan.

In late September 1962, Steve and Loretta Strelich sold the Stelrich Stadium, in Bakersfield, for a reported $100,000 to William J. Griffiths, Jerry Hill, and Jules Strongbow. The stadium served as the base of operations for "Strongbow Enterprises". With the financial backing of the Eaton family, Strongbow built a wrestling territory that covered Bakersfield, San Diego, El Monte, San Bernardino, Long Beach and Costa Mesa, California. Strongbow was regarded as one of the most powerful wrestling promoters in southern California by the end of the decade

Strongbow was able to negotiate with the World Wide Wrestling Federation to bring in one of its top stars, Bobo Brazil, who beat Buddy Austin for the WWA World Heavyweight Championship on September 2, 1966.

=== Semi-retirement ===
Starting in the late-1960s, Gene and Mike LeBell, had taken over NWA Hollywood Wrestling. Strongbow had considerably less influence after the LeBells started promoting the Grand Olympic Auditorium. He was still well regarded in the pro wrestling world, however, and oversaw the negotiations when Mike LeBell decided to rejoin the NWA in 1968. On May 28, 1970, Strongbow served as master of ceremonies when Jim Londos was honored by the Helms Athletic Foundation at the Huntington Park Elks Club.

== Death and legacy ==
Strongbow began suffering from poor health as the years went on and his wife began taking on his duties at Stelrich Stadium. With his death on 13 May 1975, the stadium was put up for sale, being bought by Jules widow, Romona, and renamed in his memory the Strongbow Stadium. Romona Strongbow held her first live event at the venue on June 19, 1975, and continued running shows for another two years. During this period, she held an annual memorial tournament with the winner being awarded the "Jules Strongbow Scientific Wrestler Trophy". Chavo Guerrero won the inaugural tournament and subsequently feuded with Roddy Piper over the trophy. Wrestling historian Steve Yohe has cited Jules Strongbow's death as speeding the decline of NWA Hollywood Wrestling. Mike LeBell ceded the Los Angeles wrestling territory to World Wrestling Federation promoter Vince McMahon, Jr. in 1982, one of the first of the old-time NWA promoters to fall victim to the WWF's national expansion during the 1980s wrestling boom. Strongbow Stadium was demolished in 2018.

== Filmography ==
Film appearances
| Year | Title | Role | Notes | Ref. |
|---|---|---|---|---|
| 1939 | Madcap Melee | Himself | Segment: Jules Strongbow vs. Hardy Kruskamp | |
| 1941 | Road to Zanzibar | Solomon | Uncredited | |

Television appearances
| Year | Title | Role | Notes | Ref. |
|---|---|---|---|---|
| 1956 | December Bride | Himself | Episode: "The Wrestler" | |
| 1956 | You Bet Your Life | Himself | Episode: "211: Food" | |

== Championships and accomplishments ==
- Southwest Sports, Inc.
  - Texas Heavyweight Championship (1 time)
