= The French Angel =

Russian-French professional wrestler (1903–1954)

Maurice Tillet
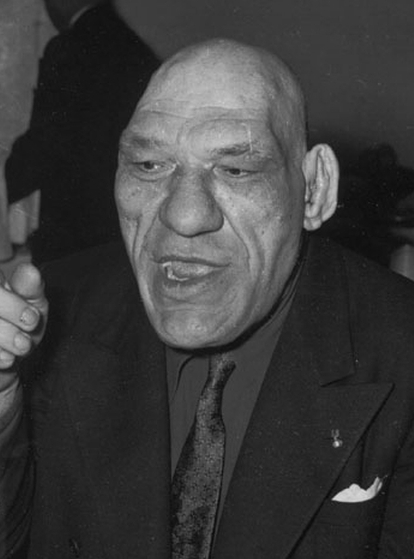
- Tillet in 1953

Personal information
- Born: Maurice Tillet; 23 October 1903 Orenburg Governorate, Ural, Russian Empire
- Died: 4 September 1954 (aged 50) Chicago, Illinois, U.S.

Professional wrestling career
- Ring name(s): The French Angel; The Angel; World's Ugliest Man; Maurice Tillet "The Angel" Maurice Tillet; The Ogre of The Ring
- Billed height: 1.70 m (5 ft 7 in)
- Billed weight: 122 kg (270 lb)
- Trained by: Karl Pojello
- Debut: 1937
- Retired: 14 February 1953

Maurice Tillet (French: [mɔʁis tije]; Russian: Мори́с Тийе́; 23 October 1903 – 4 September 1954) was a Russian-French professional wrestler, better known by his ring name, The French Angel/The Angel. Tillet was a leading box office draw in the early 1940s and was twice World Heavyweight Champion in the American Wrestling Association run by Paul Bowser in Boston.

== Early life ==
Tillet was born in 1903 in the Ural in Russia to French parents. His mother was a teacher and his father was a railroad engineer. Tillet's father died when he was young. As a child, he had a completely normal appearance and was even given the nickname "The Angel" by his mother due to his innocent face. In 1917, Tillet and his mother left Russia due to the Revolution and moved to France, where they settled in Reims. When Tillet was twenty years old, he noticed swelling in his feet, hands, and head, and after visiting a doctor was diagnosed with acromegaly—a condition usually caused by a benign tumor on the pituitary gland, resulting in bone overgrowth and thickening.

Tillet completed his law degree at the University of Toulouse, but felt he would never be successful due to his deep voice and physical appearance. Tillet served in the submarine service of the French Navy for five years as an engineer. It was also believed that Tillet could speak at least 14 languages.

== Professional wrestling career ==
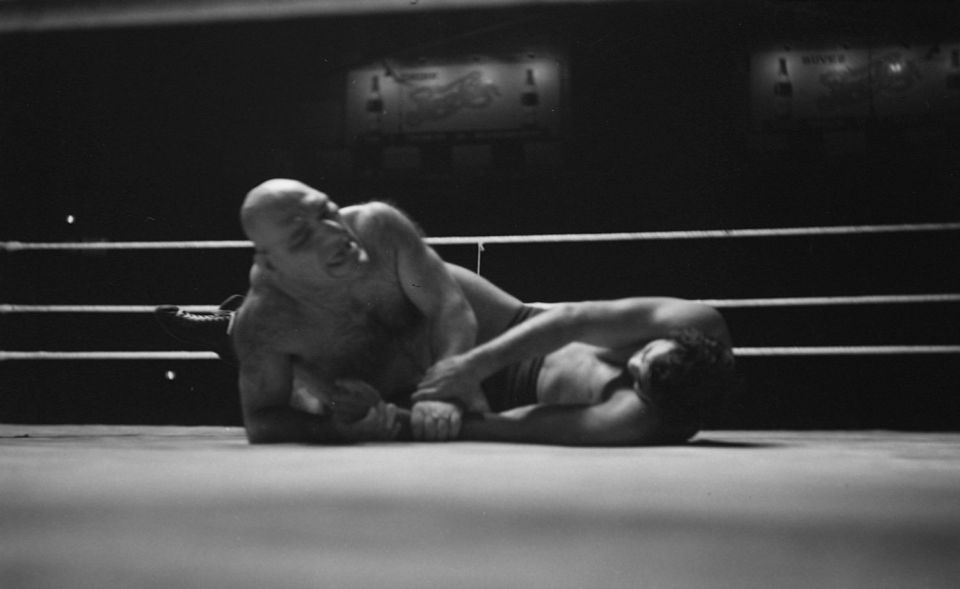
The French Angel against Lou Thesz in the ring, 1940

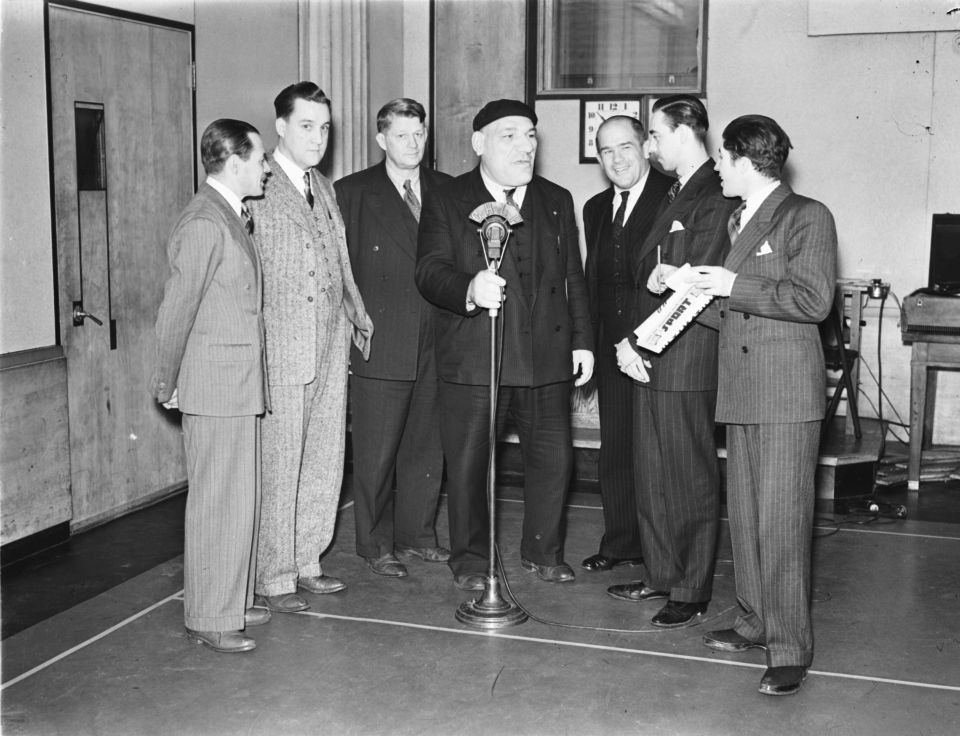
Tillet being interviewed in Montreal, 1940.

In February 1937, Tillet met Karl Pojello in Singapore; Pojello was a Lithuanian professional wrestler, and persuaded Tillet to enter the business. Tillet and Pojello moved to Paris for training, and Tillet wrestled for two years in France and England until World War II forced them to leave for the United States in 1939.

In Boston, Massachusetts, in 1940, promoter Paul Bowser pushed Tillet, who was wrestling as The French Angel, as a main eventer, and he became a large draw in the area. As a result of his popularity, Tillet was booked as unstoppable, and was unbeaten for a span of nineteen consecutive months. Tillet was the AWA World Heavyweight Champion from May 1940 until May 1942. He reappeared with the Boston-based title for a short time in 1944.

As a result of his success, several Angel imitators emerged, including Phil Olafsson (Swedish Angel), who also had acromegaly; Tony Angelo (Russian Angel), Tor Johnson (Super Swedish Angel), Jack Rush (Canadian Angel), Wladislaw Tulin (Polish Angel), Stan Pinto (Czech Angel), Clive Welsh (Irish Angel), Jack Falk (Golden Angel), Gil Guerrero (Black Angel), and Jean Noble (Lady Angel). Tillet competed against Tor Johnson, who was billed as The Swedish Angel on those occasions.

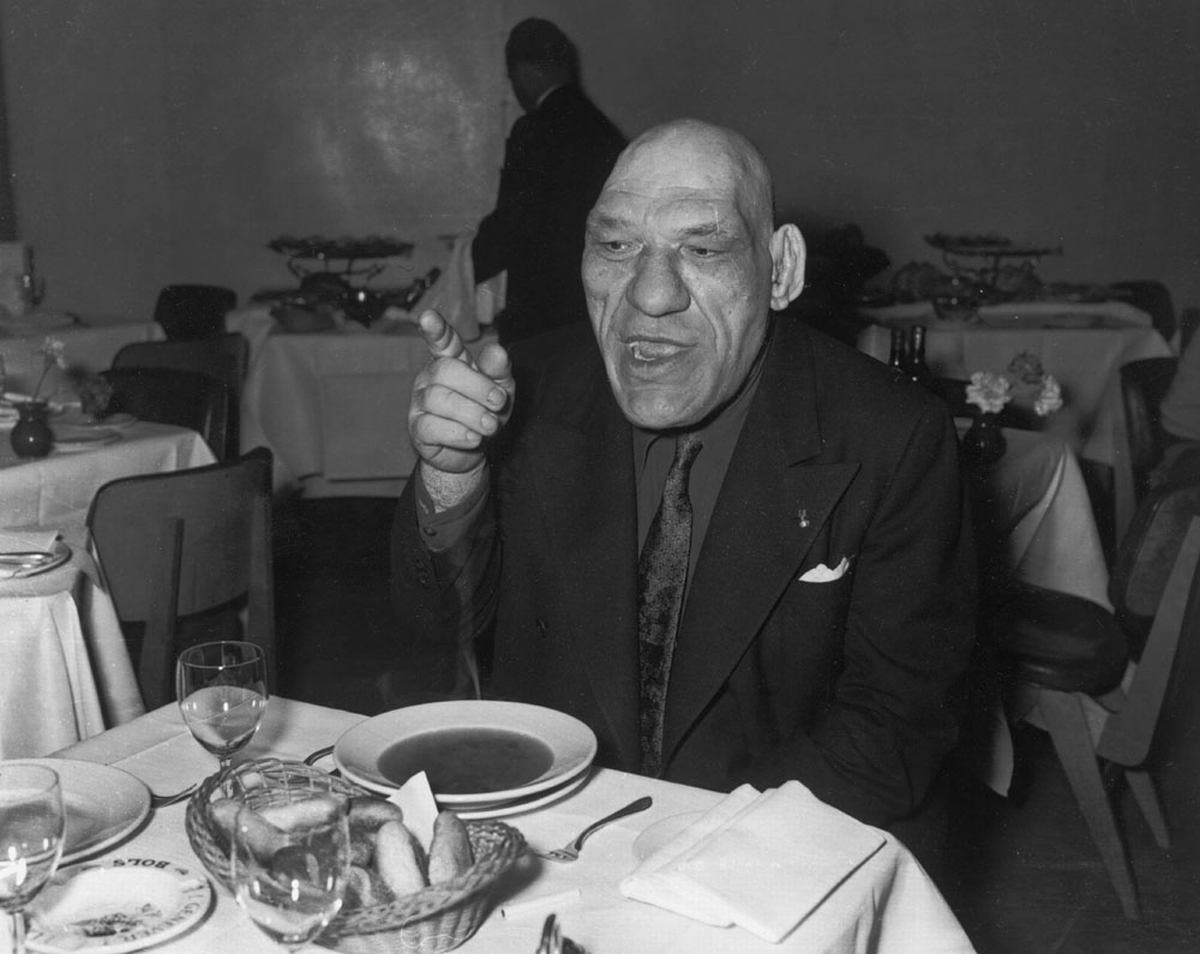
Maurice Tillet in 1953

By 1945, Tillet's health began to fail and he was no longer advertised as unstoppable. In his final wrestling match, in Singapore on 14 February 1953, working The National Wrestling Alliance Mid South Area then known as Tri-State and owned by Leroy McGuirk he agreed to lose to Bert Assirati.

In 1950, Chicago sculptor Louis Linck befriended Tillet and made a series of plaster busts commemorating him for his wrestling career. One of the busts is in Chicago's International Museum of Surgical Science. Another is now in the personal collection of Bruce Prichard.

== Death ==
Tillet died on 4 September 1954 in Chicago, Illinois. He had a heart attack after hearing of the death of his friend and former trainer, Karl Pojello.

== Championships and accomplishments ==
- American Wrestling Association (Boston)
  - AWA World Heavyweight Championship (2 times)
- Professional Wrestling Hall of Fame
  - Class of 2012

== Bibliography ==
- Parker, Mike (1983). The World's Most Fantastic Freaks. London: Octopus. ISBN 0-7064-2145-0.
