= Mr. Moto (wrestler) =

American professional wrestler (1921–1991)

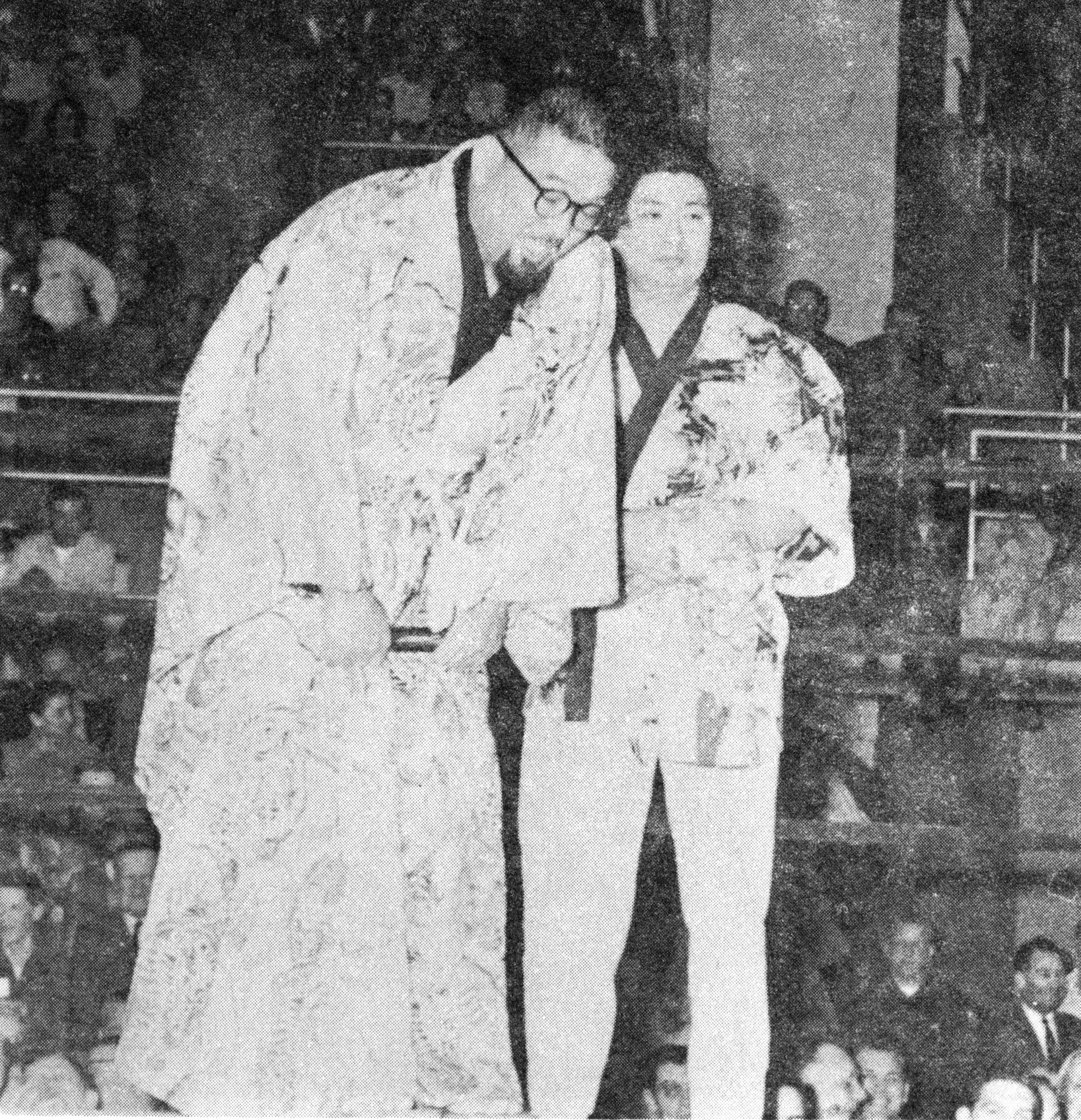
- Pre-match ritual, Anchorage, Alaska, 1958

Personal information
- Born: Masaru Iwamoto; August 11, 1915 Hawaii, U.S.
- Died: July 6, 1991 (aged 75)

Professional wrestling career
- Ring name(s): Mr. Moto; Great Moto; Charlie Chiranuhi
- Debut: 1939
- Retired: 1979

Masaru "Charlie" Iwamoto (August 11, 1915 – July 6, 1991) was an American professional wrestler better known as Mr. Moto whom portrayed as a Japanese heel during the 1940s and 1950s.

== Biography ==
Moto made his professional wrestling debut in 1939. He portrayed a Japanese heel character facing lots of racism during his career. In March 1950, Iwamoto adopted the character of Japanese heel The Great Moto, or Mr. Moto at times. Accompanied by his servant Suji Fuji, Moto would perform rituals prior to matches as a reference to his sumo days, and angered fans with his dirty tactics on his opponents. Clad with a fan, often painted nails, tiny glasses, kimonos and clogs, the barefoot brawler Moto was one of the first wrestlers to use sacred salt to attack his foes, which became a common practice among Japanese heels.

In March 1955, he was ripping a bandage off the head of his opponent Freddie Blassie when Mary Eleanor Clements, Blassie's then-girlfriend, slashed Moto in the leg with broken glass from her shattered pocket mirror. He was then escorted away by police as Clements was arrested. One day in Florida, Moto was walking through a drug store when a World War 2 veteran welted Moto in the head with a stick; he simply chose to ignore it and decided to question the man's actions. During a match with Dick "The Destroyer" Beyer, Moto was struck in the toe by a hammer, courtesy of Beyer's son, Kurt, who twice jumped the guardrail to try to save his father, not knowing it was all staged.

During most of his career he worked in Los Angeles for Hollywood Wrestling. Also worked all over the States, Canada and Japan.

On July 19, 1954, Moto and Kinji Shibuya defeated The Coughdrop Brothers (Al Smith and John Smith) to win the Mid-Atlantic Southern Tag Team Championship; he held it three more times with Shibuya and Keomuka. In 1956, Moto formed a partnership with actual Japanese heel Mr. Hito in Canada, winning the Canadian Open Tag Team Titles.

On February 2, 1956, Moto won the NWA Texas Tag Team Championship from Miguel Guzmán and Ray Gunkel with Duke Keomuka, who teamed with him before his Japanese gimmick. They held the belts until August 15, when they dropped them to Guzmán and Rito Romero. Over the next few years, Moto continued to win belts, holding the Texas Heavyweight Championship, International Television Championship, and the Georgia Southern Heavyweight Championship.

He also teamed with Tor Yamato for the NWA World Tag Team Championship in 1960, shortly before Yamato's murder. Other titles Moto held included the Pacific Coast Tag Team Championship in Vancouver with Mitsu Arakawa in March 1961, the Hawaiian Tag Team Championship with Nikita Mulkovich in July 1964, the WWA Tag Team Championship in Los Angeles with Freddie Blassie in October 1964, the Western States Championship in Long Beach in 1966, and the WWA tag belts again in 1968 with Arakawa.

Wrestled his final match in July 1979, Iwamoto was also a booker responsible for developing talent and storylines at the famous Grand Olympic Auditorium in Los Angeles, along with Freddie Blassie and Jules Strongbow.

== Championships and achievements ==
- Mid-Atlantic Championship Wrestling
  - NWA Southern Tag Team Championship (Mid-Atlantic version) (4 times) - with Duke Keomuka (2) and Kinji Shibuya (2)
- NWA All-Star Wrestling
  - NWA Pacific Coast Tag Team Championship (1 time) – with Mitsu Arakawa
- Southwest Sports, Inc. / Big Time Wrestling
  - NWA Texas Tag Team Championship (2 times) - with Duke Keomuka (2)
  - NWA World Tag Team Championship (2 times) - with Duke Keomuka
- North American Wrestling Alliance/Worldwide Wrestling Associates/ NWA Hollywood Wrestling
  - WWA International Television Tag Team Championship (6 times) – with Fred Blassie (2), Bearcat Wright (1), Kintaro Oki (1) and Tor Yamato (2)
  - WWA World Tag Team Championship (1 time) – with Fred Blassie
  - WWA International Television Tag Team Championship (5 times) – with Fred Blassie (2), Henry Lenz (1), Hans Hermann (1) and Don Leo Jonathan (1)
- 50th State Big Time Wrestling
  - NWA Hawaii Tag Team Championship (1 time) – with Nikita Mulkovitch
- Southwest Sports Inc.
  - NWA Texas Heavyweight Championship (7 times)^{1}
