= Joe Pazandak =

American professional wrestler (1914–1982)

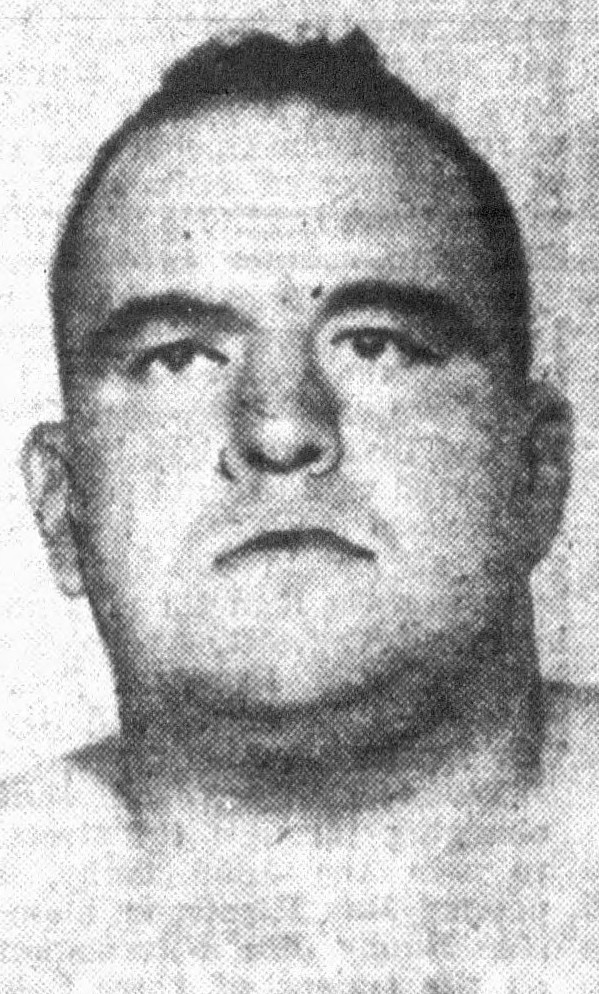
- Pazandak, circa 1951

Personal information
- Born: Joseph Eugene Pazandak; October 23, 1914 Minneapolis, Minnesota, U.S.
- Died: December 2, 1982 (aged 68) Minneapolis, Minnesota, U.S.

Professional wrestling career
- Ring name(s): Joe Pazandak; The Dark Secret
- Billed height: 5 ft 9 in (1.75 m)
- Billed weight: 230 lb (100 kg)
- Debut: 1937
- Retired: 1960

Joseph Eugene Pazandak (October 23, 1914 – December 2, 1982) was an American amateur wrestler and a professional wrestler, best known for his ring name Joe Pazandak. Pazandak received the nickname "The Champ" as he ruled the “Beat the Champ” segment on televised wrestling from Los Angeles.

== Professional wrestling career ==
Pazandak made his professional wrestling debut in his hometown in Minneapolis at the age of 22, where he faced Al Loset which ended in a 20-minute time limit draw. As an amateur heavyweight, he won two AAU championships in the Northwest and went on to wrestle at the University of Minnesota before turning professional. Within a year, Pazandak was traveling around the country from Massachusetts to North Carolina to Maryland, mostly as a semi-main event performer. Pazandak served in the United States Army as a sergeant in Africa and Italy during World War II. Pazandak returned to the United States in 1944, after seeing 624 days of active combat. His first match since returning from the war took place in October 1945, where he defeated the highly skilled Ray Steele.

Pazandak's popularity rose in the beginning of June 1951 in Los Angeles. As the inaugural NWA "Beat the Champ" Television Championship, Pazandak defended the title for nine months against top challengers. Press-Telegram once named Pazandak "the most feared man in the wrestling ranks", in reference to his undefeated record on the West Coast.

With Pazandak's amateur wrestling background, in 1948, he was hired to coach amateur wrestlers in New Zealand, which saw him working alongside Karl Pojello. Pazandak also trained Verne Gagne.

== Death ==
Pazandak died on December 2, 1983. He was 68 years old.

== Championships and accomplishments ==
=== Amateur wrestling ===
- Amateur Athletic Union
  - Northwest AAU Championship (1935–1936)

=== Professional wrestling ===
- NWA Los Angeles
  - NWA "Beat the Champ" Television Championship (1 time)
  - NWA International Television Tag Team Championship (1 time) – with Lord James Blears
- Professional Wrestling Hall of Fame
  - Class of 2016
