= The Zebra Kid =

The Zebra Kid is a ring name used by several professional wrestlers:

- George Bollas (September 19, 1923 – January 28, 1977), American wrestler, appeared as masked Zebra Kid from 1948 to 1953, returning to the persona in the 1960s.
- Lenny Montana (Leonard Passafaro, 1926–1992), American actor and wrestler, appeared as Zebra Kid in 1951–54 and 1961
- Billy Sandow (1884–1972), American wrestler and promoter, appeared as Zebra Kid in 1951
- Earl Patrick Freeman (Paddy Ryan, 1932–1989), Canadian wrestler
- Roy Bevis (born 1981), British wrestler
- The Blue Meanie (Brian Heffron, born 1973), American wrestler
- Kevin Clark (1950-2020), American wrestler
- John Saracco (born 1984), American wrestler wrestles as Zebra Kid 2017-present
