= Billy Darnell =

American professional wrestler

Personal information
- Born: February 25, 1926 Camden, New Jersey, U.S.
- Died: September 7, 2007 (aged 81) Maple Shade Township, New Jersey, U.S.

Professional wrestling career
- Ring names: Billy Darnell; Billy Rogers
- Debut: 1942
- Retired: 1961

Billy Darnell (February 25, 1926 – September 7, 2007) was an American professional wrestler and major star of the 1940s and 1950s, with his career spanning over twenty years with championships in the National Wrestling Alliance and World Wide Wrestling Federation.

== Early life ==
Darnell was born in Camden, New Jersey. At age 16, while working as a lifeguard in Wildwood, New Jersey, he was playfighting with co-workers when a wrestling promoter spotted him and asked him to help with his roster, as many current ones were seeing action in World War II.

== Career ==
His first match with later rival Buddy Rogers was in February 1944, tagging with him in Philadelphia and Baltimore-Washington. Darnell would himself leave wrestling for World War II service in December 1944, joining the United States Army. Post-war Darnell returned to wrestling in Texas, once more with Rogers, who had previously wrestled under his real name Herman Rohde. At the time he was becoming "Nature Boy" Buddy Rogers, and Darnell was booked as his brother Billy Rogers. This was largely in part to promoter and Rogers' booker Jack Pfefer, though Darnell himself has stated he wasn't sure if the idea for the brother gimmick was Rogers' or Pfefer's.

Darnell and Rogers next went to California, with wrestling reaching new popularity thanks to television exposure. For the showmanship of it Rogers donned sequined capes, whereas Darnell first donned the leopard-skin outfit, for which he would become famous. Their careers would become forever intertwined when they began facing each other with Rogers as the heel champion and Darnell becoming a heavy fan favorite. Promoters nationwide wanted the Rogers-Darnell match, with more than 200 matches occurring between them. Despite their history Rogers still crushed discs in Darnell's neck with a botched piledriver, though he himself accidentally knocked out some of Rogers' teeth. Les Thatcher has even stated that Darnell's matches with Rogers inspired him to enter the wrestling business.

Darnell was also known for a well recognized team with Bill Melby, winning the Chicago version of the NWA World Tag Team Championship with him in 1953. In 1954, he worked with Sam Muchnick in St. Louis and also booked for an Indiana promotion. In a televised match on 20 May 1961, Darnell beat Ali Pasha (Alexander Vieira Fontes) who died of a heart attack after being slammed down.

He used his World War II G.I. Bill to attend aviation school and become a pilot, flying himself to his matches. He also ran a nightclub until 1985. Though Darnell retired in 1961, he would wrestle sparsely into the next year, then went to a chiropractic school in Glendale, California, finishing in Indiana. He would begin practicing in his home of New Jersey and moved to Florida for a period, getting back in touch with Rogers, before returning to New Jersey. Darnell regularly attended Cauliflower Alley Club reunions and received the Senator Hugh Farley Award from the Amsterdam, New York-based Professional Wrestling Hall of Fame. Darnell died on September 7, 2007, at his home in Maple Shade Township, New Jersey.

== Championships and accomplishments ==
- Cauliflower Alley Club
  - Other honoree (2004)
- National Wrestling Alliance
  - NWA World Tag Team Championship (Chicago & Indianapolis version) (2 times) - with Bill Melby
  - NWA World Tag Team Championship (Los Angeles version) (1 time) - with Sandor Szabo
- Midwest Wrestling Association
  - Ohio Heavyweight Championship (2 times)
  - Ohio Tag Team Championship (1 time) - with Rocco Columbo
- Worldwide Wrestling Associates
  - WWA International Television Tag Team Championship (1 time) - with Sandor Szabo
- Professional Wrestling Hall of Fame and Museum
  - 2007 Senator Hugh Farley Award recipient
- Other Titles
  - World Heavyweight Championship (Jack Pfeffer version)
