= IMSS =

IMSS may refer to:

- Mexican Social Security Institute, (Instituto Mexicano del Seguro Social, IMSS, its Spanish acronym)
- Istituto e Museo di Storia della Scienza, now the Museo Galileo, a museum in Florence, Italy
- Integrated Maritime Surveillance Systems, an integrated network of coast-line radars by the Indonesian Navy
- International Museum of Surgical Science, a museum in Chicago, US
- InterScan Messaging Security Suite, an enterprise e-mail antivirus software, by Trend Micro
