= Mr. Moto (disambiguation) =

Mr. Moto is a fictional Japanese secret agent in a series of novels by John P. Marquand.

Mr. Moto may also refer to:

- Mr. Moto (wrestler) (1915 – 1991), an American professional wrestler
- A song by 1960s surf band The Bel-Airs
- Dr. Moto, a ring name of professional wrestler Tor Kamata
- A Yakuza boss character played by George Takei in "Drift Problem", a season 3 episode of the television series Archer
