= Kazys Petkevičius =

Lithuanian basketball player (1926–2008)

Personal information
- Born: 1 January 1926 Steigviliai, Lithuania
- Died: 14 October 2008 (aged 82) Kaunas, Lithuania
Medal record
Men's basketball
Representing Soviet Union
Olympic Games
Silver medal – second place	1952 Helsinki	Team
Silver medal – second place	1956 Melbourne	Team
European Championships
Gold medal – first place	1947 Czechoslovakia	Team
Gold medal – first place	1953 USSR	Team
Bronze medal – third place	1955 Hungary	Team

Kazimieras "Kazys" Petkevičius (1 January 1926 – 14 October 2008) was a Lithuanian basketball player who competed for the Soviet Union in the 1952 Summer Olympics and in the 1956 Summer Olympics. He played for Žalgiris in Kaunas and later for Spartak Leningrad in Leningrad.

Petkevičius graduated from the State Institute of Physical Education (now Lithuanian Sports University) in 1949 and continued his post-graduate studies in Leningrad.

Until the end of his life he worked as an assistant coach for the Lithuanian basketball club Žalgiris-Arvydas Sabonis school.
