= Karl Davis (wrestler) =

American professional wrestler

- Born: Karl Thurman Davis; April 16, 1908; Columbus, Ohio, U.S.
- Died: July 1, 1977 (aged 69); Hesperia, California
- Occupations: Professional wrestler; actor; trainer; security consultant; police officer; baseball player; football player
- Years active: 1925–1957 (professional wrestling); 1949–1961 (acting)
- Professional wrestling career
- Ring name(s): Killer Karl Davis; Crippler Karl Davis; El Diablo #2; Red Devil #2; The Red Mask; The Mask; Big Boy Davis; Carl Davis; Joe Lawrence
- Billed height: 6 ft 2 in (188 cm)
- Billed weight: 240 lb (109 kg)
- Billed from: Houston, Texas; Memphis, Tennessee; Crested Butte, Colorado
- Trained by: John Pesek
- Debut: 1925
- Retired: 1957

Karl Thurman Davis, Sr. (April 16, 1908 – July 1, 1977) was an American professional wrestler, best known by his ring name, Crippler Karl and Killer Karl Davis. Regarded as one of the most hated "heel performers" during the 1930s and 40s, he was given the "Crippler" moniker by Toronto sportswriter Johnny Fitzgerald after injuring Whipper Billy Watson during a bout in Toronto. Davis is perhaps best remembered for his tenure in the Gulf Athletic Club where he won the Texas Heavyweight Championship once and Southern Heavyweight Championship three times. He was at one time a claimant to the original World Heavyweight Wrestling Championship, having decisions over Ed "Strangler" Lewis and Jim Londos, before his defeat by Chief Little Beaver in 1937. He also formed successful tag teams with Wee Willie Davis, both as themselves and masked wrestlers Los Hermanos Diablos, and Ted Christy in NWA Hollywood Wrestling between 1947 and 1955.

In his 35-year career, Davis wrestled for extended periods of time for various wrestling promotions: Al Haft Sports, the American Wrestling Association, Eastern Sports Enterprises, Fred Kohler Enterprises, Gulas-Welch Enterprises, Heart of America Sports Attractions, International Wrestling Association, Jack Pfefer Promotions, Jim Crockett Promotions, John J. Doyle Enterprises, Mike London Sports, Minneapolis Boxing & Wrestling Club, Pinkie George Promotions, Rocky Mountain Sports Enterprises, Queensbury Athletic Club, Salt Lake Wrestling Club, Sam Avey Inc., Sam Muchnick Sports Attractions, San Francisco Booking Office, Tom Packs Sports Enterprises, and Western States Sports.

After his initial retirement from professional wrestling, Brooks pursued a career in acting and became a popular character actor throughout the 1950s. A tall and striking individual he was frequently cast as a henchman.

== Early life ==
A native of Columbus, Ohio, Davis attended Ohio State University and graduated in 1928 with a degree in civil engineering and physical education. A standout athlete in basketball, baseball, football, Davis was a four-sport letterman and selected as an All-American fullback in 1927–28. He pursued a career in professional sports and played for both the Philadelphia Yellowjackets and the St. Louis Cardinals. Davis achieved an 11–2 record before an injury ended his baseball career after playing one season.

== Professional wrestling career ==
While still attending OSU, Davis began wrestling professionally in order to pay his way through school. He initially used the assumed name of "Joe Lawrence" and also wrestled under a mask. He eventually adopted the name Karl "Killer" Davis, and other names, appearing in almost 3,000 matches. One of the most hated "heel performers" in pro wrestling, he frequently had to leave the ring under a police escort and sustained numerous scars on his hands from attacks by irate wrestling fans. On July 20, 1938, after defeating Yvon Robert in a Best 2-out-of-3 Falls match at the Montreal Forum, a French-Canadian man broke through the police cordon and slashed him in the face. Davis required a total of 46 stitches (17 on the inside and 29 on the outside) on his lower lip. The fan, a government tax collector, was eventually arrested and served over a year in jail.

Davis was suspended from competition for excessive violence several times during his career. He used his "shoulder bust" finisher to seriously injure four opponents over a 9-week period in Toronto. Officials finally took action against Davis for breaking the left shoulder of Vincent Lopez in front of 11,000 fans at the Grand Olympic Auditorium in 1947, issuing him an eight-month suspension. Davis was also one of June Byers' initial trainers, and who was discovered by women's wrestling manager Billy Wolfe while facing Davis in an intergender match at one of Morris Siegel's "Friday Night Wrestling" shows in Houston.

At age 41, Davis took up acting and made his feature film debut with a small role in the 1949 film Mighty Joe Young. Initially only in small, uncredited roles, he began to appear in cast lists from 1951 and received regular roles in both film and TV for a decade. Davis became a born-again Christian during the mid-1950s, appearing with fellow wrestlers Jules Strongbow and Tiny Roebuck at the Church of the Open Door for a Youth for Christ rally in June 1956, and was also ordained as a Pentecostal minister. In his later years, Davis was critical of the pro wrestling industry as it began to focus more on "gimmick characters", such as Gorgeous George and Classy Freddie Blassie, designed to appeal to television audiences. He cited this as one of the reasons for retiring from wrestling in 1957.

== Retirement and later years ==
In 1962, Davis founded the private security firm Desert Security Patrol to protect homes and businesses in Hesperia, California. He had previously served 9 years as a patrolman with the Houston Police Department while wrestling for the Gulf Athletic Club. Within a few years, his company had a staff of six patrolmen and a radio operator. Working closely with the local sheriff's department, Desert Security Patrol was responsible for investigating a number of local crimes during the mid-1960s and, in August 1965, Davis personally captured a burglary suspect following a high speed chase. He was also an avid golfer and won numerous trophies competing in country club tournaments.

== Death ==
Davis was forced to step down as head of Desert Security Patrol after suffering a series of heart attacks. He died at his home on 1 July 1977 in Hesperia, and subsequently cremated at Montecito Memorial Park. At the time of his death, Davis was living alone, destitute and surviving on social security having lost most of his money through bad investments over the years.

== Personal life ==
Davis married his first wife, Virginia Rexine Dye, on October 8, 1928. They had three children, Nancy Jean (1929–1995), Mona Lee (1929–1995) and Carl Jr. (1931–1994), before separating in the mid-1940s. He had two more children from a second marriage prior to marrying his third wife, Clara Louise Deburn (1927–2001) in Las Vegas, Nevada in 1956. Fellow wrestler Hans Schnabel served as his best man. Davis became the stepfather of her three children Bobbie (born 1948), Michael Steven (born 1953) and Ronald Bruce (1955–1998).

== Filmography ==
Film appearances
Year	Title	Role	Notes	Ref.
1949	Mighty Joe Young	The Circus Strongman	Uncredited	
1949	The Reckless Moment	Wrestler	Uncredited	
1949	Always Leave Them Laughing	Bouncer	Uncredited	
1950	The Daughter of Rosie O'Grady	Stagehand with hook	Uncredited	
1950	Gambling House	Big	Uncredited	
1951	Fingerprints Don't Lie	Rod Barenger		
1951	Mask of the Dragon	Kingpin		
1952	Flesh and Fury	Broadway character	Uncredited	
1952	Young Paul Baroni	Boxing spectator	Uncredited	
1952	Young Man with Ideas	Punchy		
1953	Salome	The Slave Master		
1953	Fair Wind to Java	Reeder	Stunt double Uncredited	
1953	Siren of Bagdad	Morab		
1953	Sangaree	Brawler	Uncredited	
1953	The Lost Planet	Karlo / Robot R-4		
1953	The Great Adventures of Captain Kidd	Culliford's Crewman		
1954	Demetrius and the Gladiators	Macro		
1954	The Egyptian	Libyan Guard		
1954	So This Is Paris	Angel		
1955	Timberjack	Red Bush		
1955	Pirates of Tripoli	Assassin		
1955	The Road to Denver	Hunsacker		
1955	Creature with the Atom Brain	Willard Pearce		
1957	Zombies of Mora Tau	Zombie		
1957	Apache Warrior	Bounty Man		
1958	The Bonnie Parker Story	The Texan		
1958	Man or Gun	Swede		

Television appearances
Year	Title	Role	Notes	Ref.
1951	Dick Tracy	Hefty	2 episodes	
1951	Boston Blackie	Killer / Turk	3 episodes	
1952	The Cisco Kid	Gregg / Jiggers	2 episodes	
1952	Fireside Theatre		Episode: "Hurry, Hurry"	
1952	Adventures of Wild Bill Hickok	Abdul	Episode: "Wrestling Story"	
1953	Mr. and Mrs. North	Giant	Episode: "Jade Dragon"	
1953	Space Patrol	Durk	Episode: "The Vital Factor"	
1954	Annie Oakley	Charlie Bassett / Steve	2 episodes	
1955	The Life of Riley	Fascinating Freddie, the Wrestler	Episode: "Riley Buys a Wrestler"	
1956	Playhouse 90	Wrestler	Episode: "Requiem for a Heavyweight"	
1958	Sky King	Mighty Morgan	Episode: "The Brain and the Brawn"	
1958	Death Valley Days	Convict	Episode: "The Telescope Eye"	
1958	The Adventures of Jim Bowie	Bald Man	Episode: "The Cave"	
1958	State Trooper	Big Mike George	Episode: "Joker's Dead"	
1958	Alfred Hitchcock Presents	Dan Foley	Episode: "Safety for the Witness"	
1958–1959	26 Men	Red Dolan / Ebbie Holiday	2 episodes	
1958–1959	Mike Hammer	Louis / Jutman	2 episodes	
1959	Frontier Doctor	Dobe	Episode: "Bitter Creek Gang"	
1959	Bronco	Marcus Traxel	Episode: "Silent Witness"	
1959	Perry Mason	Leo Kaster	Episode: "The Case of the Stuttering Bishop"	
1959–1961	Lawman	Hayes / Gang Member	2 episodes	
1960	Startime	Big Man	Episode: "The Young Juggler"	
1960	Surfside 6	Rudy Walper	Episode: "Odd Job"	
1961	The Tab Hunter Show	Finnegan	Episode: "Personal Appearance"	

== Championships and accomplishments ==
- Gulf Athletic Club
  - Southern Heavyweight Championship (Texas version) (3 times)
  - Texas Heavyweight Championship (1 time)
