= Louis Linck =

French and American sculptor

- Born: January 12, 1895; Paris, France
- Died: October 21, 1962 (aged 67); Chicago, Illinois, U.S.
- Known for: Sculpture

Louis Linck (January 12, 1895 – October 31, 1962) was a French and American sculptor. During his lifetime of sculpting he worked for a number of private clients as well as the Works Progress Administration (WPA), during the Depression, and the International College of Surgeons. His most accessible work is a number of larger-than-life statues permanently on display at the International Museum of Surgical Science in Chicago.

== Biography ==
=== Early life ===
Louis Linck was born in Paris and grew up in the 18th district (Arrondissement). His father was an accountant, and although Louis also had a knack for math, he preferred art (much to his father's dismay). He had two sisters, although one died in childhood, and his mother died when he was 18. He had just graduated with a degree in Engineering, but like most men of his generation, he soon joined the French Army at the outbreak of World War I. His artistic skills, however, put him in the map-making department, which may have helped him survive.

=== Education ===
Linck studied at the National School of Decorative Arts in Paris. In the 1920s he won a competition sponsored by the Northwestern Terra Cotta Company of Chicago and moved to Illinois to work for them. He was employed by the American Art Bronze Foundry for several years, making models of plaques and medals, and also worked for Chicagos Century of Progress Exposition. In 1935 he was hired by the Federal Art Project to design several pieces of public sculpture. The FAP was a New Deal program that supported art education across the United States.

=== Marriage and children ===
He met his future bride, Rose, on Armistice Day, November 11, 1918, in a small French town near the Belgian border, as the Germans were retreating from France. They were married in 1920, and continued to live with Louis's father in Paris. They had two daughters, both born prior to their emigration to the U.S.

- Lucienne (1921 – ) born in Mohon, France.
- Georgette (1925 –; 2003 ) born in Paris, France.

=== Career ===
In 1926, Linck entered a contest in France for sculptors. The 12 winners would get a 1-year contract to work in Chicago for the Northwestern Terra Cota Company. (At the time, the style of many of the new buildings there included sculptures, bas-reliefs, etc.) Louis was one of the winners, so he, his wife, and their youngest daughter left for Chicago in February 1927. After living there several months, they decided to stay, and sent for their older daughter to join them.

Around 1930, Northwestern laid off most of their workers, a result of the Great Depression. Fortunately, Rose had a job, so Louis was able to continue his art work in spite of the lack of paying work. Later in the 1930s, Louis worked for the Illinois Art Project, or IAP, which was a state program funded by the Works Progress Administration's Federal Art Project. At least two pieces he did for the IAP were later donated to the Smithsonian by Louis Chester; one of these is currently (2007) on display.

From 1953 to 1954, he worked on a number of larger-than-life-size sculpted figures for the International College of Surgeons, now known as the International Museum of Surgical Science, located on Lakeshore Drive in Chicago. These are still on permanent display in their "Hall of Immortals", and include statues of Marie Curie, Andreas Vesalius, Wilhelm Conrad Röntgen, Ambroise Paré, Joseph Lister, and Hippocrates. His good friend and colleague, Edouard Chassaing, did a number of the other statues in this display.

His daughter reports that he was somewhat well known for his 3/4-profile bas-relief plaques, which he did of Douglas MacArthur, Charles de Gaulle, and other individuals.

== Works ==
International Museum of Surgical Science
1524 N. Lake Shore Dr.
Chicago, IL 60610

- Statues:

Marie Curie
Wilhelm Conrad Röntgen
Ambroise Paré
Andreas Vesalius
Hippocrates
Joseph Lister
Asklepios

- bust:

"The Angel (Bust of Maurice Tillet)", 1950

Polo Players
ca. 1935–1940
plaster
2 men with 2 horses
5 1/2 × 5 5/8 × 3 7/8 in. (14.0 × 14.4 × 10.0 cm)
Smithsonian American Art Museum
Gift of Louis Cheskin
1977.42.5
On view at:
Smithsonian American Art Museum
4th floor, Luce Foundation Center, Case 48A

Reclining Nude Figure
1930–1940
painted plaster
female full-length nude
4 1/2 × 6 5/8 × 9 7/8 in. (11.4 × 16.7 × 25.0 cm)
Smithsonian American Art Museum
Gift of Louis Cheskin
1977.42.6
Not currently on view

== See also ==
- International Museum of Surgical Science
- Federal Art Project
- List of Federal Art Project artists
- Works Progress Administration
