= George Bollas =

American professional wrestler (1923–1977)

Personal information
- Born: George Alexander Bollas; September 19, 1923 Warren, Ohio, United States
- Died: January 28, 1977 (aged 53) Akron, Ohio, United States

Professional wrestling career
- Ring name(s): The Zebra Kid; George Bollas; Big Zebra; Dark Secret; Golden Terror; Panzer #3
- Billed height: 5 ft 10 in (178 cm)
- Billed weight: 336 lb (152 kg)
- Debut: 1947
- Retired: 1968

George Bollas (September 19, 1923 – January 28, 1977) was an American professional wrestler known for his masked persona of The Zebra Kid. He worked in various territories; notably in Hawaii, New York City, and England.

== Early life ==
Born to Greek parents in Warren, Ohio. Bollas attended Warren G. Harding High School, where he played football. Bollas was also a talented amateur wrestler at Ohio State University, where he defeated Morris Chitwood of Indiana University to win the NCAA Heavyweight Championship.

== Professional wrestling career ==
In 1947 Bollas made his debut in professional wrestling in Ohio for Al Haft.

In 1948, Bollas became the Zebra Kid due to stretch marks on his body from fluctuating weight. Zebra Kid would wear a mask and striped gear.

On July 7, 1949, Zebra Kid defeated Buddy Rogers in Ohio for Jack Pfeffer's World Heavyweight Championship.

Bollas feuded with Rikidozan in 1952 in San Francisco.

In early 1953, Bollas stopped using the Zebra Kid gimmick. During his career, he was unmasked many times. Lenny Montana used the gimmick as well.

In October 1954, Bollas went back to the Zebra Kid gimmick in Hawaii working for 50th State Big Time Wrestling. He won the NWA Hawaii Heavyweight Championship defeating Lucky Simunovich on April 10, 1955.

After he emerged victorious in a match with Bearcat Wright on July 13, 1957, a mob of fifty fans attacked him. He returned a month later and was unmasked by Buddy Rogers.

In 1958 Bollas worked in New York City for Capitol Wrestling Corporation forming a tag team with Jim Austeri as the Zebra Kids. Bollas was Big Zebra and Austeri was Little Zebra. The team lasted until 1959.

In 1960, he toured Paris and Athens, the latter of where he defeated the Greek hero Andreas Lambrakis before a crowd of 43,000. On January 4, 1961, the Zebra Kid and Mike Sharpe defeated Nick Bockwinkel and Edouard Carpentier to capture the International Television Tag Team Championship, holding it until June 21, when they were dethroned by Alberto Torres and Ramón Torres. He later traveled to Japan for Rikidozan's Japan Wrestling Association and returned to Texas again.

In 1963, Bollas made his debut in England for Dale Martin's Promotions and Joint Promotions in England. In 1964, Bollas moved his family to England. Bollas would promote matches in Greece with his cousin and defeated George Gordienko before a crowd of 15,000 in Athens in 1965. However, his cousin took all the money leaving him broke.

In 1968, Bollas retired from wrestling after suffering a serious eye injury in Germany.

== Death ==
On January 28, 1977, Bollas died in hospital in Akron, Ohio at 53. His knees had been worn out after years of wrestling. In addition to heart problems, he had issues exercising and controlling his weight overall.

In September 1998, he was inducted by his children into the Ohio State University Athletics Hall of Fame.

== Championships and accomplishments ==
- 50th State Big Time Wrestling
  - NWA Hawaii Heavyweight Championship (1 time)
- Pacific Northwest Wrestling
  - NWA Pacific Northwest Tag Team Championship - with Hans Schnabel
- NWA Hollywood Wrestling
  - NWA "Beat the Champ" Television Championship (1 time)
- Southwest Sports, Inc.
  - NWA Brass Knuckles Championship (Texas version) (1 time)
- Jack Pfefer Promotions
  - World Heavyweight Championship (Jack Pfeffer version) (4 times)
- Worldwide Wrestling Associates
  - WWA International Television Tag Team Championship (1 time) - with Mike Sharpe
