= Steigviliai =

- Village
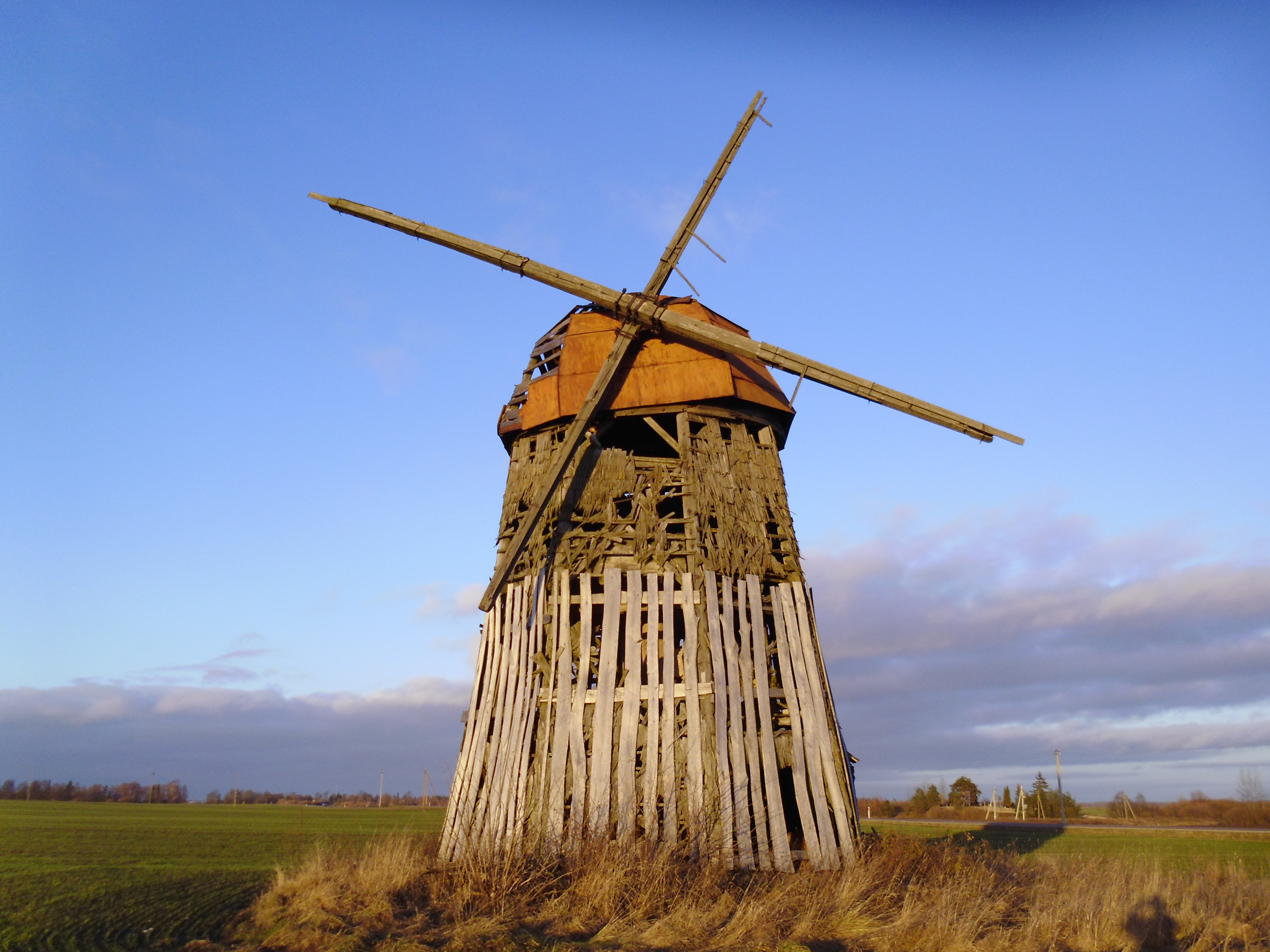
- Windmill in Steigviliai

- Location of Steigviliai
- Coordinates: 56°11′N 24°01′E
- Country: Lithuania
- Ethnographic region: Aukštaitija
- County: Šiauliai County
- Municipality: Pakruojis District Municipality
- Eldership: Žeimelis eldership

Population (2011)
  - Total: 76
- Time zone: UTC+2 (EET)
  - Summer (DST): UTC+3 (EEST)

Steigviliai (Polish: Stejgwile) is a village in the northeastern Pakruojis District Municipality, Lithuania. It is located 4 kilometres (2.5 mi) north from Ūdekai and east of the Beržtalis river. According to the 2011 census, it had 76 residents. The village has many surviving authentic masonry and wooden residential houses and barns, including a windmill. Agricultural firm "Žiemagra" is based in the village.

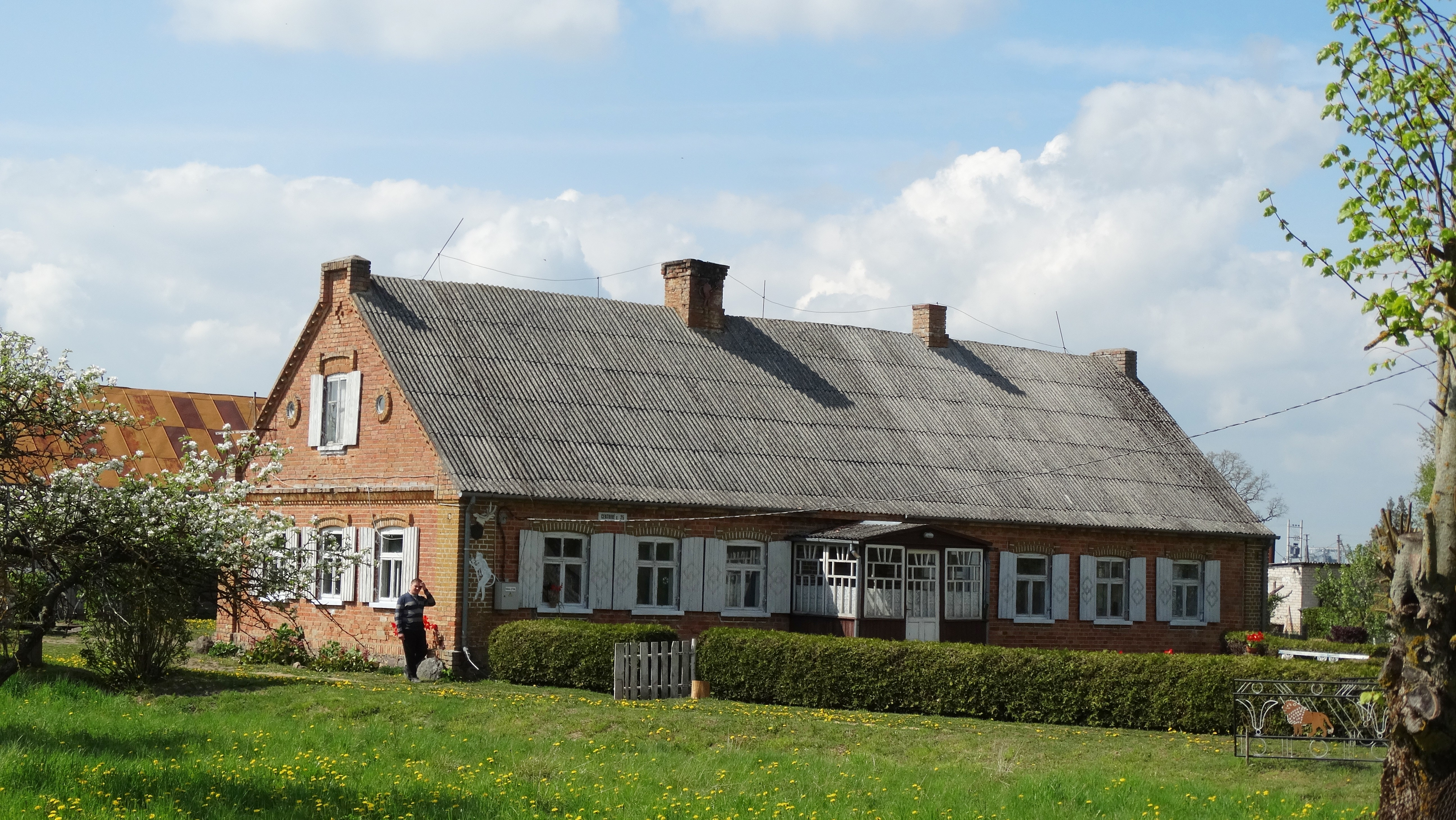
Old masonry house in Steigviliai

== History ==
Inventory of Guostagalis, taken during the Volok Reform in 1555, mentioned vogt Jonas Steigvilionis whose last name likely became the name of the village. He was vogt of Paberžtalė (i.e. by Beržtalis river) village, which had 30 voloks of land and 20 voloks of forest, but stood empty. Steigviliai village was mentioned in 1675 in baptismal records of a nearby church.

In the 19th century, the village was a "royal" village, i.e. exempted from corvée, and owned about 60 dessiatins of land. This enabled a few villagers to earn a decent living, educate their children, and join the Lithuanian National Revival. A few men from Steigviliai and neighboring villages organized illegal book smuggling during the Lithuanian press ban.

In 1903, one of the first Lithuanian evenings was held in a barn of Požėla, a farmer of Steigviliai. The villages performed a three-act drama Iš tamsos į šviesą (From Darkness to Light) by Adomas Sketeris, a writer and doctor from Žeimelis. The play depicted a son who refused his family's wishes for him to study at a priest seminary and instead finished a gymnasium and university. The spectators included Vincas Mickevičius-Kapsukas, the future Lithuanian communist political activist, who contributed a short description of the evening to Lithuanian newspaper Lietuva, published in the United States.

During the Soviet years (1945–1990), Steigviliai was part of a kolkhoz (collective farm), named after Karolis Požela, had an elementary school, which was located in farmstead previously owned by local farmer J. Valiulis, and a library.

== Famous people ==
- Karl Pojello (1893–1954), wrestler of Imperial Russia, USA and Europe
- Kazys Petkevičius (1926–2008), basketball player and coach
- Vladas Požela (1879–1960) Lithuanian lawyer, Minister of the Interior
- Vladislovas Požela (1913–1997) priest, Righteous Among the Nations
