= History of Chatham Islands numismatics =

In 1999 a private organisation, the Chatham Islands Note Corporation, issued banknotes to celebrate the Chatham Islands being the first human-inhabited land to enter the third millennium. Banknotes such as these cannot be declared legal tender, and there is no obligation for anyone to accept the notes issued by the Chatham Island Note Corporation in any transaction. These notes were reported to have been accepted by merchants on the Chatham Islands, some of whom served as directors of the issuer.

The Chatham Islands Note Corporation was initially based in Christchurch. The agent for providing the notes to the numismatic trade was Leon Morel, Fellow of the Royal Numismatic Society of New Zealand of Melbourne, Victoria. The corporation later shifted their base of operations to Waitangi.

The face value of the notes was pegged at the same rate as the New Zealand dollar. They are unusual in that the first series included $3 and $15 notes, while the second series includes an $8 note.

== Not legal tender ==
The Reserve Bank of New Zealand clarified that these notes are not legal tender. The Reserve Bank Deputy Governor Murray Sherwin mentioned that "Whilst these Chatham Island dollars are a bit of fun,... if people want to use them to undertake transactions, that's fine too."

== The series ==
Series I notes consist of $2, $3, $10 and $15 denominations, and exhibit a very strong influence from American currency designs. There were printed in late 1999, still in time for their release on January 1, 2000. They were printed on polymer Tyvek paper with the artwork by Timely Marketing & Promotions Limited, Christchurch and Dunedin, New Zealand. Tyvek is a plastic-type material, and the notes are dual-denominated—in cents as well as in dollars. The same-numbered sets which came out in cardboard folders, also bear a completely different hologram, as compared to the currency issue. (Note: The hologram is a very good security device, as it prevents forgery.) There are three printings of this series. (Note: Those of the 3rd printing are the only ones that have been seen by one of the authors.)

Full sets of this series are now scarce.

Series II notes, consisting of $3, $5, $8, $10 and $15 denominations, were printed some time during the year 2000 for release in 2001. They were printed on cotton-fibre paper by Chan Wanich Security Printing Company Limited, Thailand. The front of these notes is very similar to the Series I notes, apart from the dates and other details. Again, these notes are dual-denominated in cents and dollars. There are also three printings of this series with same-serial numbered sets produced, but not in cardboard folders, having a different hologram than the first currency issue. This hologram is unique in that it incorporates an albatross bird that flies when viewed through a special security device.

In 2001, a $5 coin was put into circulation at the same time as the Series II notes. A 5,000 piece issue was then planned; however, informed of the intention to issue a coin, the Reserve Bank of New Zealand banned the issue, despite the fact that there was no $5 coin in circulation in New Zealand. An estimated 200 pieces ended up in the numismatic trade. (Note: There are only 200 of the Chatham Islands $5 coins known to exist, specially minted for the release date and issued to the numismatic trade (or to Leon Morel) prior to the ban.) The balance, other than a remaining 100 held by CINC, were never minted.

== Description ==
To assist collectors and dealers, a catalogue numbering system has been provided. Below, 'Work' numbers (indicated by the letter 'W') to the items, have been assigned for clarity.

=== Series I ===
The date '2000' is in the four corners. The notes have the map of the Chatham Islands at left of the under-print and Chatham Islands taiko at right. Green frame on the backs of the notes. Printer's name at the bottom on the backs of the notes. A hologram depicts a globe showing the Asia-Pacific region with '1st' superimposed, an inner circle with the words 'WORLD FIRST' and 'AUTHENTIC' (which can be seen depending on the direction in which a note is tilted), and an outer circle, which has a rainbow pattern going around like a flywheel. The notes of the same-serial numbered folder issue has '1st' printed in white on top of the hologram, which has an interlocking pattern consisting of the year 2000.

==== $2 (The Sea) ====
W1a. Two dollars (200 cents).

- Front: Purple and grey-blue under-print.
- Back: Lobster, the sea and Chatham Islands black robin.
- Theme: The Sea.

W1b. Same-serial numbered folder issue.

- As above currency issue.

==== $3 (The Community) ====
W2a. Three dollars (300 cents).

- Front: As above, but purple and red-pink under-print.
- Back: First motor vehicle, the community and Chatham Islands black robin.
- Theme: The Community.

W2b. Same-serial numbered folder issue.

- As above currency issue.

==== $10 (The History) ====
W3a. Ten dollars (1,000 cents).

- Front: As above, but green and yellow-brown under-print.
- Back: The history and Chatham Islands black robin.
- Theme: The History.

W3b. Same-serial numbered folder issue.

- As above currency issue.

==== $15 (The Land) ====
W4a. Fifteen dollars (1,500 cents).

- Front: As above, but green and brown under-print.
- Back: Nīkau palm, Chathams' horse power and Chatham Islands black robin.
- Theme: The Land.

W4b. Same-serial numbered folder issue.

- As above currency issue.

=== Series II ===
They are made of cotton fibre paper. The date 2001 is in three corners. The notes have an albatross replacing the map of the Chatham Islands at left of the under-print. Chatham Islands Taiko at right. Olive-green-black frames on the backs of the notes. The currency notes and the ones in the same-numbered sets have computer style numbering in the serial numbers whereas the replacement notes have block numbers in the serial numbers. The hologram of the notes depicts a compass with a wavy pattern in the outer silver area. The map of the Chatham Islands and the Chatham Islands Note Corporation is seen when a note is tilted in one direction and a rock lobster can be seen when the note is tilted in the other direction. The printer name is at the bottom on the backs of the notes.

==== $3 (Horse Racing) ====
W5a. Three dollars (300 cents).

- Front: Pink and yellow under-print.
- Back: Horse racing, Chatham Islands Jockey Club (1873), Woytek's Fool.
- Theme: Horse Racing.

W5b. Same-serial numbered issue.

- As above currency issue.

W5p. As above currency issue, but has the serial number 'A000000'. (Printer's Specimen).

W5r. As above currency issue, but the serial number has a star at the end of it. (Replacement note).

==== $5 (The Ancestors) ====
W6a. Five dollars (500 cents).

- Front: As above, but green and yellow under-print.
- Back: Morioris, Woytek's Generations.
- Theme: The Ancestors.

W6b. Same-serial numbered issue.

- As above currency issue.

W6p. As above currency issue, but has the serial number 'A000000'. (Printer's Specimen).

W6r. As above currency issue, but the serial number has a star at the end of it. (Replacement note).

==== $8 (Center — The Message) ====
W7a. Eight dollars (800 cents).

- Front: As above, but lilac and blue under-print.
- Back: A new dawn with the Spring symphony and guardians of Mt Hakepa, Pitt Island. Map of the Chatham Islands.
- Theme: Center — The Message.

W7b. Same-serial numbered issue.

- As above currency issue.

W7p. As above currency issue, but has the serial number 'A000000'. (Printer's Specimen).

W7r. As above, but the serial number has a star at the end of it. (Replacement note).

==== $10 (Wrestler) ====
W8a. Ten dollars (1,000 cents).

- Front: As above, but lilac-blue and green-yellow under-print.
- Back: Abe Jacobs World Champion Wrestler, Woytek's Warrior.
- Theme: Wrestler.

W8b. Same-serial numbered issue.

- As above currency issue.

W8p. As above currency issue, but has the serial number 'A000000'. (Printer's Specimen).

W8r. As above currency issue, but the serial number has a star at the end of it. (Replacement note).

==== $15 (Sunderland Flying Boat) ====
W9a. Fifteen dollars (1,500 cents).

- Front: As above, but blue, pink and yellow under-print.
- Back: Short Sunderland, Woytek's Astronomer.
- Theme: Flying Boat.

W9b. Same-serial numbered issue.

- As above currency issue.

W9p. As above currency issue, but has the serial number 'A000000'. (Printer's Specimen).

W9r. As above currency issue, but the serial number has a star at the end of it. (Replacement note).

=== Collector Series ===
- WCSI. Series I Same-serial numbered folder issue (W1b — W4b).
- WCSII. Series II Same-serial numbered issue (W5b — W9b).

=== Uncut Sheets ===
These were only issued for Series II (W5 - W9). These have a four-digit serial number range from S0001 to S1000.

- WUSI. 4×$3.
- WUSII. 3×$5.
- WUSIII. 3×$8.
- WUSIV. 2×$10.
- WUSV. 2×$15.

=== Signature chart ===
- Director of the Corporation — Secretary of the Treasury.
- Series I. Clint McInnes. John Day.
- Series II. Indecipherable. J. Day.

Error notes are not listed, even though these do exist, nor have the postal notes and postal orders that were issued in the Chatham Islands.

=== WCI. $5 Milled Edge Coin 1-1/4 inches (30 mm) in diameter ===
Limited number (less than 300 are known to exist) - Now scarce

- Obverse: A head-and-shoulders portrait of Tommy Solomon (born 1884, died 1933. Popularly believed to have been the last full-blooded Moriori) splitting the date '2001'. The inscription,'FIVE NEW MILLENNIUM DOLLARS' is below the portrait.
- Reverse: Map of the Chatham Islands with '$5' below. It is inscribed, 'CHATHAM ISLANDS NEW ZEALAND TERRITORIES SOUTH PACIFIC'.

=== WCII. Sterling Silver $50 Milled Edge Coin 1.5 inches (38 mm) in diameter ===
Scarce

- Obverse: A portrait of King George III (ruled 1760–1820) based on Benedetto Pistrucci's portrait as used on the British 1/2 Crown of 1817–20, the 5-shilling (1 Crown) of 1818–20, 1/2 Sovereign of 1817–20, the Sovereign of 1818 and 1820, the 2 pounds and 5 pounds pattern coins of 1820. The monogram 'G III' is split at the forehead level. The inscription, 'CHATHAM ISLANDS' is above the King's portrait. The dates '1760–1820' are inscribed below the chin. The date '2001' appears below the truncation. The inscription, 'FIFTY DOLLAR MILLENNIUM SILVER PIECE' goes from behind the King's portrait around to the front at eye level.
- Reverse: The design is a compass pointing North, a ship, and an 18th-century Royal Navy officer's hat with the number '50' superimposed on the hat. The outer inscriptions are 'LIEUT BROUGHTON. BRIG CHATHAM 1791'. The inner inscription is 'DISCOVERY OF THE CHATHAM ISLANDS 44 DEG S LAT 176 DEG 20 MIN W LONG'. The inscription 'FIFTY DOLLAR PIECE' appears below the '50'.
- The $50 coin is a dual commemorative: The Millennium and the 210th Anniversary of the British discovery of the Chatham Islands.
- Both the $5 and the $50 coins have milled edges.

== Additional information ==
=== Notes ===
Verified - Chatham Islands Note Corporation Limited
