= Karl Pojello =

Lithuanian professional wrestler and promoter (1893 – 1954)

Personal information
- Born: Karolis Požėla; February 13, 1893 Steigviliai, Šiauliai County, Russian Empire (now Lithuania)
- Died: September 4, 1954 (aged 61) Chicago, Illinois, U.S.

Professional wrestling career
- Ring name: Karl Pojello
- Billed weight: 190 lb (86 kg)

Karl Pojello (born Karolis Požėla, February 13, 1893 – September 4, 1954) was a Lithuanian-American professional wrestler and promoter.

== Early life ==
Pojello was born in Steigviliai, Russian Empire, in 1893. In 1906, he moved to St. Petersburg, Russia, to work in a pharmacy owned by his brothers Antanas and Motiejus. During World War I he fought on the side of the Russian army.

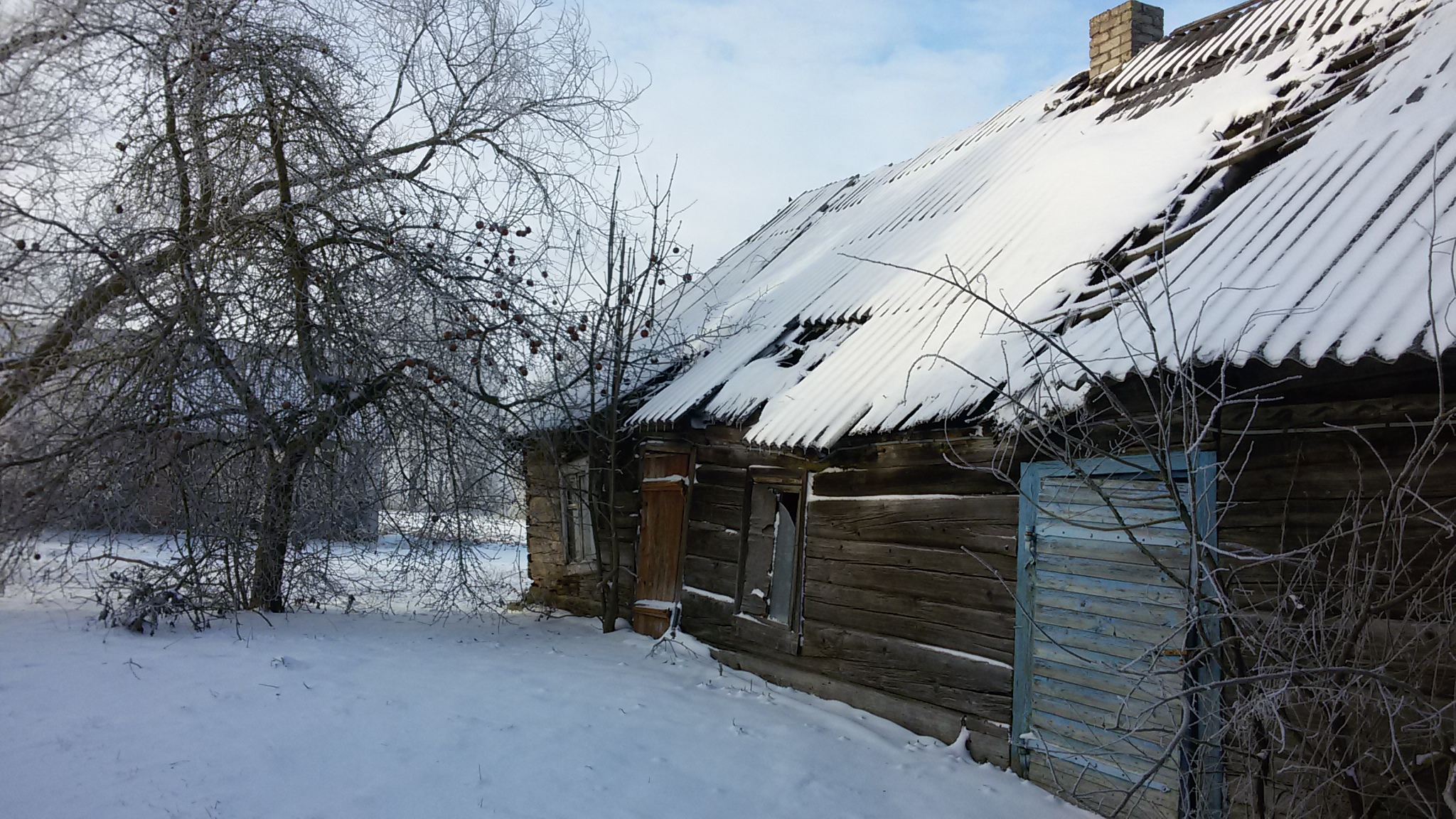
Birthplace of Karl Pojello in Steigviliai

== Wrestling career ==
At the age of 18 he was thought to be one of the best amateur wrestlers in Russia. In 1913 Požėla won an international wrestling tournament in Breslav.

As a successful amateur wrestler, he joined a group of professional wrestlers traveling from city to city. With them he traveled to and wrestled in China, Japan, and in 1924 he came to Chicago. In 1927, he met a Lithuanian wrestling promoter A. Tamašiūnas. There he beat Canadian wrestling champion Carl van Wurden in under 3 minutes. When he beat Johnny Mayers, another Lithuanian wrestler, considered to be middleweight champion of the world, he came to fame and recognition. At the time he was one of the most popular professional wrestlers in the United States.

Pojello met Maurice Tillet in Singapore in February 1937, and convinced him to become a professional wrestler. Pojello went back to Europe with Tillet and wrestled there until the start of World War II, when he and his friend were forced to return to the US.

== Death ==
Pojello died on September 4, 1954, from lung cancer. Upon hearing of the death of Pojello, Maurice Tillet had a heart attack; he was taken to Cook County Hospital, where he died on the same day. Pojello and Tillet are buried together at the Lithuanian National Cemetery.

== Championships and accomplishments ==
- European Heavyweight Championship (1 time)
