= Aileen Eaton =

American boxer

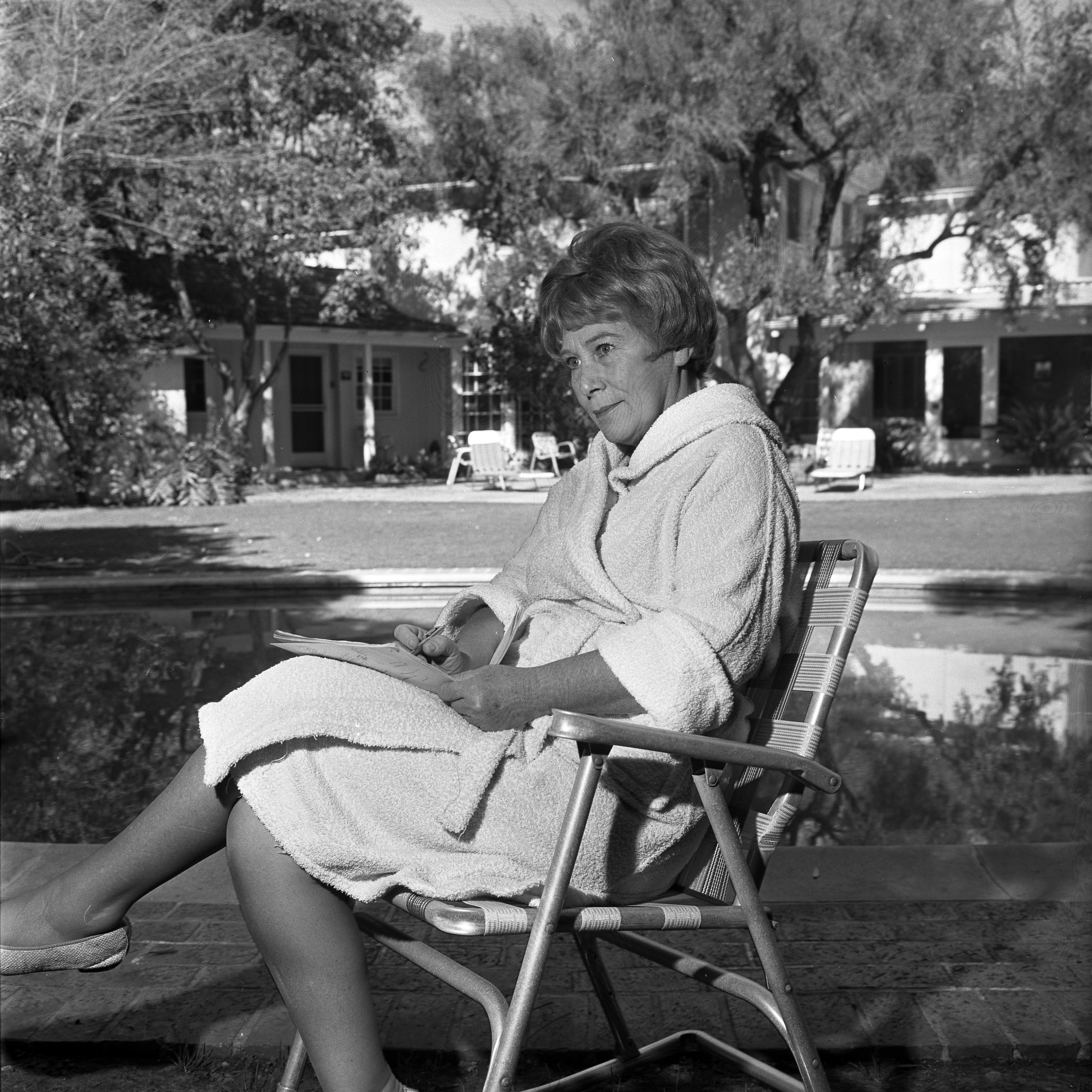
Eaton in 1967

Aileen LeBell Eaton (February 5, 1909 – November 7, 1987), also called "Mrs. Boxing", was an American boxing and professional wrestling promoter who was influential in the United States' west coast's boxing and wrestling scene for five decades. In 2002, she was the first woman inducted into the International Boxing Hall of Fame.

Eaton was born in Vancouver, British Columbia, Canada. She attended Los Angeles High School.

Her second husband, Cal Eaton, was a boxing promoter in Los Angeles. She got involved in her husband's business in 1942. During her career as a promoter, Eaton would get involved with big-name promoters and fighters, sometimes traveling to other states in search of business. Eaton is the mother of martial artist and professional wrestler Gene LeBell and professional wrestling promoter Mike LeBell.

Eaton appeared as a contestant on the panel game show What's My Line? on October 22, 1961. A panel of Arlene Francis, Barry Nelson, Dorothy Kilgallen and Bennett Cerf was unable to guess Eaton's occupation as a boxing promoter.

Cal died in 1966. Nicknamed The Redhead, Eaton took over presidency of her husband's company and went on to stage more than 10,000 boxing bouts and as many wrestling matches at the L.A. Olympic Auditorium, promoting such fighters as Floyd Patterson, Danny Lopez, Carlos Palomino, Joe Frazier and George Foreman before she retired in 1980. When alongside her husband, she had also helped promote fights of Sugar Ray Robinson and Carmen Basilio, among others.

Eaton died in November 7, 1987 after an extended period of illness.

In 1994, she was inducted into the Southern California Jewish Sports Hall of Fame. Eaton was inducted into the International Boxing Hall of Fame in 2002, the first woman in the hall. In 2011, Eaton, along with her sons Gene and Mike LeBell, was inducted into National Wrestling Alliance's Hall of Fame. She was inducted into the International Women's Boxing Hall of Fame in 2017.

== See also ==
- NWA Hollywood Wrestling
