= WWA International Television Tag Team Championship =

Professional wrestling tag team championship

Details
- Promotion: Worldwide Wrestling Associates
- Date established: 1954
- Date retired: 1964

Other name
- WWA United States Tag Team Championship
Statistics
- First champions: Wilbur Snyder and Sandor Szabo
- Most reigns: (As a tag team); Stan Holek and The Preacher (3 reigns) (As individual); Lord James Blears (8 reigns)
- Longest reign: The Destroyer and Don Manoukian (212 days)
- Shortest reign: Lord James Blears and Joe Pazandak, Don Leo Jonathan and Lord Leslie Carlton (7 days)

The WWA International Television Tag Team Championship was the tag team title in the Los Angeles–based Worldwide Wrestling Associates from the title's formation in 1954 (as the NWA International Television Tag Team Championship, renamed as a North American Wrestling Alliance title with that promotion's formation in 1958 and then as a WWA title in 1961 when the promotion was renamed) until 1964, when it was replaced with the WWA World Tag Team Championship.

== Title history ==
Wrestler:	Times:	Date:	Location:	Notes:
WWA International Television Tag Team Championship
Wilbur Snyder and Sandor Szabo	1	January 25, 1954	Hollywood, California	Defeated Lord James Blears and John Tolos for the title.
Lord James Blears and Lord Athol Layton	1	March 8, 1954	Hollywood, California	
Wilbur Snyder ^{(2)} and Sandor Szabo ^{(2)}	2	c. April 1954 (NLT)		Sometime after March 10, 1954.
The Great Bolo and Tom Rice	1	April 5, 1954	Hollywood, California	Or April 19, 1954; Snyder and Szabo may continue to be billed as champion in Bakersfield, California.
Wilbur Snyder ^{(3)} and Bobo Brazil	1	June 3, 1954 (NLT)	Hollywood, California	Sometime after May 27, 1954.
Lord James Blears and Lord Athol Layton	2	c. August 1954	Hollywood, California	Sometime before August 14, 1954.
Vacant				Sometime before September 6, 1954.
Wilbur Snyder ^{(4)} and Bobo Brazil ^{(2)}	2	September 6, 1954	Hollywood, California	Defeated Blears and Gene Kiniski for the title.
Gene Kiniski and John Tolos	1	October 13, 1954	Los Angeles, California	
Lord James Blears ^{(3)} and Joe Pazandak	1	November 22, 1954	Hollywood, California	
Bobo Brazil ^{(3)} and Sandor Szabo ^{(3)}	1	November 29, 1954	Hollywood, California	
Great Bolo ^{(2)} and Tom Rice ^{(2)}	2	January 19, 1955	Los Angeles, California	
Bill Melby and Johnny Barend	1	February 7, 1955	Hollywood, California	
Tom Rice ^{(3)} and Juan Humberto	1	March 7, 1955	Hollywood, California	Still champions as of April 9, 1955.
Tosh Togo and Great Togo	1	June 2, 1955		Still champions as of October 20, 1955.
Lee Henning and Tom Rice ^{(4)}	1	March 3, 1956	Hollywood, California	
Don Leo Jonathan and Lord Leslie Carlton	1	May 7, 1956	Hollywood, California	Defeated Lee Henning and Tom Rice for the title.
Lee Henning ^{(2)} and Tom Rice ^{(5)}	2	May 14, 1956	Hollywood, California	
Rito Romero and Chief War Cloud	1	June 4, 1956	Hollywood, California	
Lord James Blears ^{(4)} and Sandor Kovacs	1	July 21, 1956		Still champions as of August 4, 1956.
Rito Romero ^{(2)} and Ray Stern	1	September 15, 1956		
Lord James Blears ^{(5)} and Lord Leslie Carlton ^{(2)}	1	November 24, 1956		
Bobo Brazil ^{(4)} and Primo Carnera	1	November 28, 1956	Hollywood, California	Defeated Lord James Blears and Lord Athol Layton for the title.
Lord James Blears ^{(6)} and Lord Leslie Carlton ^{(3)}	2	March 1957		
Gene Stanlee and Sandor Szabo ^{(4)}	1	March 9, 1957	San Bernardino, California	Still champions as of April 6, 1957.
Ilio DiPaolo and Tex Mckenzie	1	1957		
Sky Hi Lee and Shag Thomas face Bobo Brazil and Sandor Szabo for the title on April 24, 1957 in Los Angeles, California (champions unknown).
Hans Hermann and Mr. Moto	1	July 6, 1957	San Bernardino, California	
Seymour Koenig and Sammy Berg	1	September 1957		
Hans Hermann ^{(2)} and Hans Schmidt	1	November 2, 1957		Still champions as of December 7, 1957.
Wild Red Berry and Bob Orton	1	February 15, 1958		
Pepper Gomez and Charro Azteca	1	February 22, 1958	San Bernardino, California	
Wild Red Berry ^{(2)} and Bob Orton ^{(2)}	2	March 1, 1958	San Bernardino, California	
Lord James Blears ^{(7)} and Henry Lenz	1	March 1958		Sometime before March 29, 1958.
Seymour Koenig ^{(2)} and Herb Freeman	1	June 11, 1958	Los Angeles, California	Defeated Billy Varga and Hardy Kruskamp for the title.
Rito Romero ^{(3)} and Suni War Cloud	1	June 1958		Sometime between June 12 and June 23, 1958.
Seymour Koenig ^{(3)} and Herb Freeman ^{(2)}	2	June 1958		Sometime between June 24 and June 27, 1958; still champions as of August 16, 1958.
Wild Red Berry ^{(3)} and Tosh Togo ^{(2)}	1	September 1958		
Sandor Szabo ^{(5)} and Billy Darnell	1	September 1958		
Frank Jares and Matt Murphy	1	November 22, 1958		May have been held-up after a match against Enrique Romero and Luis Martinez on January 14, 1959 in Los Angeles, California.
Enrique Romero and Luis Martínez	1	February 7, 1959	Los Angeles, California	Defeated Frank Jares and Matt Murphy for the title. This may have been a rematch.
Hans Hermann ^{(3)} and Hardy Kruskamp	1	March 21, 1959	San Bernardino, California	
Enrique Romero and Luis Martinez	2	March 29, 1959	San Bernardino, California	
Eric Pederson and Henry Lenz ^{(2)}	1	April 6, 1959	Los Angeles, California	Still champions as of May 9, 1959.
Billy Varga and Hardy Kruskamp ^{(2)}	1	May 29, 1959		Still champions as of July 25, 1959.
The Fabulous Kangaroos (Al Costello and Roy Heffernan)	1	August 22, 1959		Still champions as of September 17, 1959.
Billy Varga ^{(2)} and Hardy Kruskamp ^{(3)}	2	November 19, 1959		
Sandor Szabo ^{(6)} and Edouard Carpentier	1	December 16, 1959	Los Angeles, California	Defeated Art Michalik and Legs Wilson for the title.
The Fabulous Kangaroos; Al Costello and Roy Heffernan)	2	June 15, 1960	Los Angeles, California	
Dick Hutton and Sam Steamboat	1	July 16, 1960	Los Angeles, California`	
Stan Holek and The Preacher	1	August 20, 1960	San Bernardino, California	
Sandor Szabo ^{(7)} and Edouard Carpentier ^{(2)}	2	October 19, 1960	Los Angeles, California	
Stan Holek and The Preacher	2	December 3, 1960	San Bernardino, California	
Nick Bockwinkel and Lord James Blears ^{(8)}	1	December 23, 1960	Long Beach, California	
Stan Holek and The Preacher	3	December 31, 1960		
Nick Bockwinkel ^{(2)} and Edouard Carpentier ^{(3)}	1	January 4, 1961	Los Angeles, California	
Mike Sharpe and Zebra Kid	1	May 12, 1961	Long Beach, California	
The Torres Brothers (Alberto and Ramón Torres)	1	June 29, 1961	Bakersfield, California	
Freddie Blassie and Mr. Moto ^{(2)}	1	November 9, 1961	Bakersfield, California	
Lou Thesz and Sailor Art Thomas	1	November 22, 1961	Los Angeles, California	
Hans Hermann ^{(4)} and Jess Ortega	1	December 1961		
Freddie Blassie ^{(2)} and Mr. Moto ^{(3)}	2	January 17, 1962	Los Angeles, California	
Vacant		February 1962		When Blassie and Moto split up.
Billy Varga ^{(3)} and Mario LaPentero	1	March 15, 1962	Long Beach, California	Defeated Nick Bockwinkel and King Koenig in tournament final.
Dick Garza and Eric Rommel	1	July 4, 1962	Los Angeles, California	
Sir Alan Garfield and Karl Von Schober	1	September 26, 1962	Los Angeles, California	
Haystack Calhoun and Abe Jacobs	1	October 31, 1962	Los Angeles, California	
The Destroyer and Don Manoukian	1	December 19, 1962	Los Angeles, California	Have defeated Haystack Calhoun and Abe Jacobs on November 29, 1962 in Los Angeles, California to win International Television Title; renamed the United States Title.
WWA United States Tag Team Championship
Bearcat Wright and Mr. Moto ^{(4)}	1	July 19, 1963	Los Angeles, California	Starts being billed as the world title in Bakersfield, California in July 1963.
Freddie Blassie ^{(3)} and Don Leo Jonathan ^{(2)}	1	September 28, 1963	Long Beach, California	
Bearcat Wright ^{(2)} and Red Bastien	1	November 21, 1963	Los Angeles, California	
Mr. Moto ^{(5)} and Kintarō Ōki	1	December 10, 1963	Long Beach, California	
The Neilson Brothers (Art Neilson and Stan Neilson Stan Holek ^{(4)})	1	January 9, 1964	North Hollywood, California	Repeated in San Bernardino, California on January 11, 1964.
Edouard Carpentier ^{(4)} and Ernie Ladd	1	February 1, 1964	San Bernardino, California	
Permanently replaced by the WWA World Tag Team Championship
