= International Museum of Surgical Science =

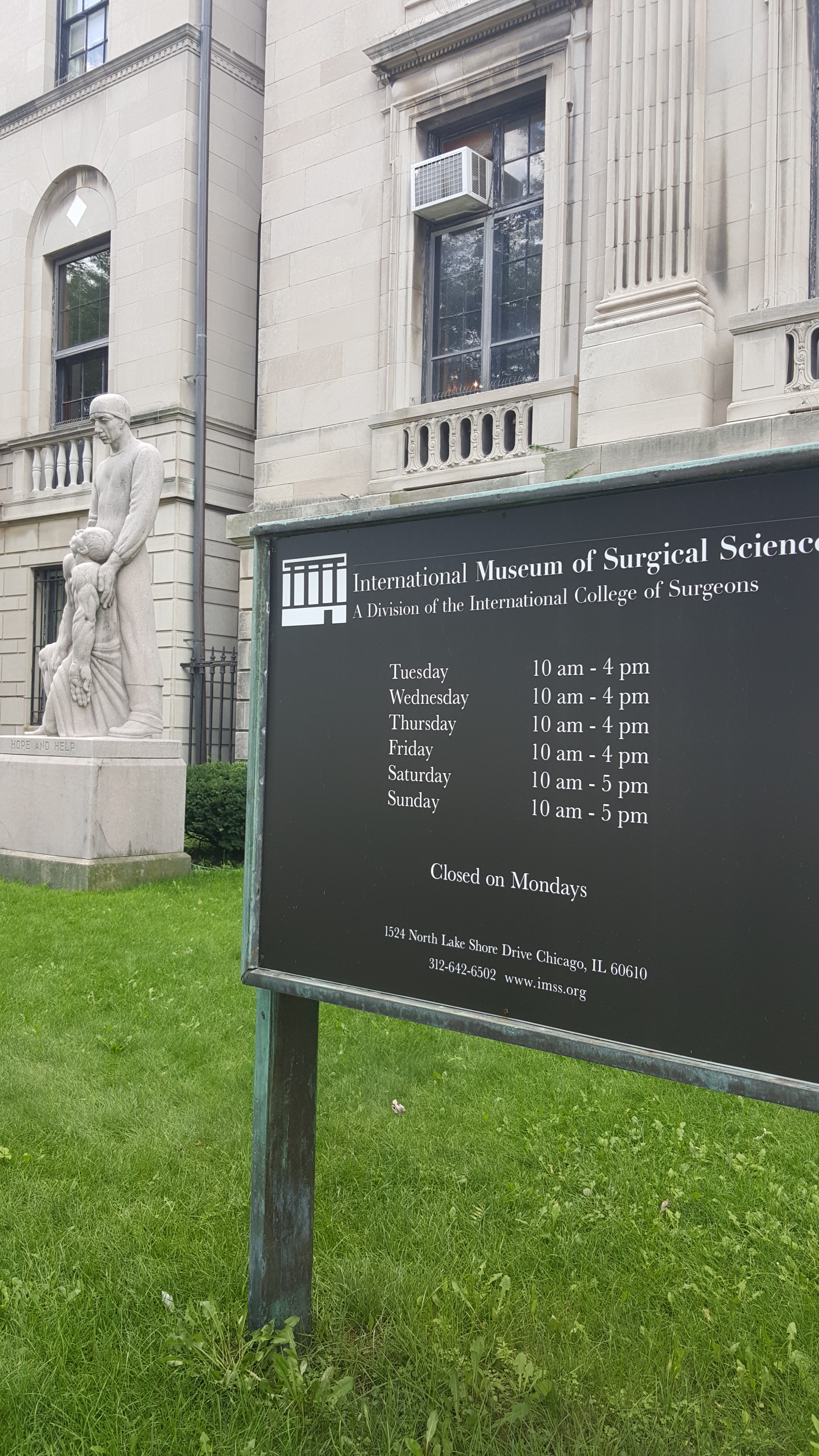
- Established: 1954
- Location: 1524 N. Lake Shore Dr. Chicago, Illinois
- Coordinates: 41.9103°N 87.6266°W
- Type: Medical museum
- Collection size: 7000+ medical artifacts
- Public transit access: Red Clark/Division; 155
- Website: www.imss.org

The International Museum of Surgical Science is a museum located in the Gold Coast neighborhood of Chicago, Illinois. It is operated by The International College of Surgeons and features exhibits dealing with various aspects of Eastern and Western medicine. Dr. Max Thorek founded the International College of Surgeons (ICS) in 1935 and originally intended for the museum to highlight the many artifacts and manuscripts the college housed, but artifacts were later added strictly for the museums collection. The museum opened to the public on September 9, 1954. The museum's exhibits are displayed by theme or surgical discipline. Displays include photographs, paintings and drawings, sculpture, medical equipment, skeletons, medical specimens and historic artifacts. The library contains more than 5,000 rare medical texts.

According to its mission statement, "The museum's Mission is to enrich people’s lives by enhancing their appreciation and understanding of the history, development, and advances in surgery and related subjects in health and medicine."

The museum is housed in a 1917 mansion designed by Howard Van Doren Shaw as a replica of the Petit Trianon at Versailles. The house was originally built for Chicago socialite Eleanor Robinson Countiss Whiting who died in 1931. The Countiss family were the sole owners of the house until the International College of Surgeons acquired the building in 1950. The house is 4 stories tall and houses 10,000 square feet (930 m^{2}) of public galleries that hold a number of permanent and temporary exhibits. The museum, as of 2025, rents rooms out for weddings and parties, and also hosts musical concerts, often in collaboration with other non-profit and for-profit organizations.

In addition to displaying medical artifacts the museum owns, since 1998, hosted a number of contemporary art exhibitions in an effort to broaden its appeal to visitors. In 2010, visitor numbers were at 20,000 a year, by 2013 this had increased to between 25,000 and 30,000.

== Artifacts and exhibits ==
The museum houses over 7,000 artifacts medical artifacts and over 600 paintings, prints, and sculptures. Highlights of artifacts include:

- Austrian amputation saw with reversible blade. (c. 1500)
- original X-rays taken by radiology pioneer Emil Grubbé (c. 1910)
- the Lindbergh perfusion pump, invented by the aviator Charles Lindbergh and surgeon Alexis Carrel. (1935)
- Collection of trephined skulls from ancient Peru.
- Portrait of Dr. Edward Jenner by John Russell. (1790)
- Plaster cast made from the death mask of Napoleon. (1821)
- The Hall of Immortal statues. Depicting 12 great members of medicine and scientific discovery. Attributed to sculptors Louis Linck and Édouard Chassaing.
- Hall of Murals. 12 mural panels painted in oils illustrating the development of surgery throughout the ages. Commission by the museum in 1953 by Gregorio Calvi di Bergolo.
- A reconstructed medical apothecary.
- An iron lung used for those inflicted with polio.

The museum is 4 floors with a total of 20 exhibits including:

- The Historical Apothecary
- Pharmacy
- Dentistry
- Hall of Murals
- Optical History
- Polio
- Hall of Immortals
- Medical Library
- Taiwan Room
- Classroom and Nursing
- Obstetrics and Urologie
- Japan Room
- Medical Illustrations
- Medical Imaging
- Understanding and Enduring Pain (Has an online tour extension)
- Spanish Mural Gallery
- Surgical Technology
- And 3 Rotating Contemporary Art Galleries

The museums hosted a temporary exhibit from February 19, 2016 – March 5, 2017 entitled Provident Hospital: A Living Legacy. It told the story of Provident Hospital, a groundbreaking teaching hospital that dedicated and paved the way for black people in the field of medicine. The exhibit is still viewable through an online tour extension.

A May 15 - August 2, 2026 exhibit, Unheard Voices of Care: Filipino Nurses in America, was created with the support of the Filipino American Historical Society of Chicago. It draws on the book by Angel Abcede, House of Nurses: An American Journey, which details the work of his mother and aunts, and he is serving as lead coordinator of the exhibit.

The museum also has a IMSS Artist in Residency Program that host two residency sections a year for several artist for 6 months at a time.

== See also ==
- Visual arts of Chicago
- The Mütter Museum
- Gold Coast Historic District
- Lake Shore Drive
