= NWA Hollywood Wrestling =

Defunct professional wrestling territory

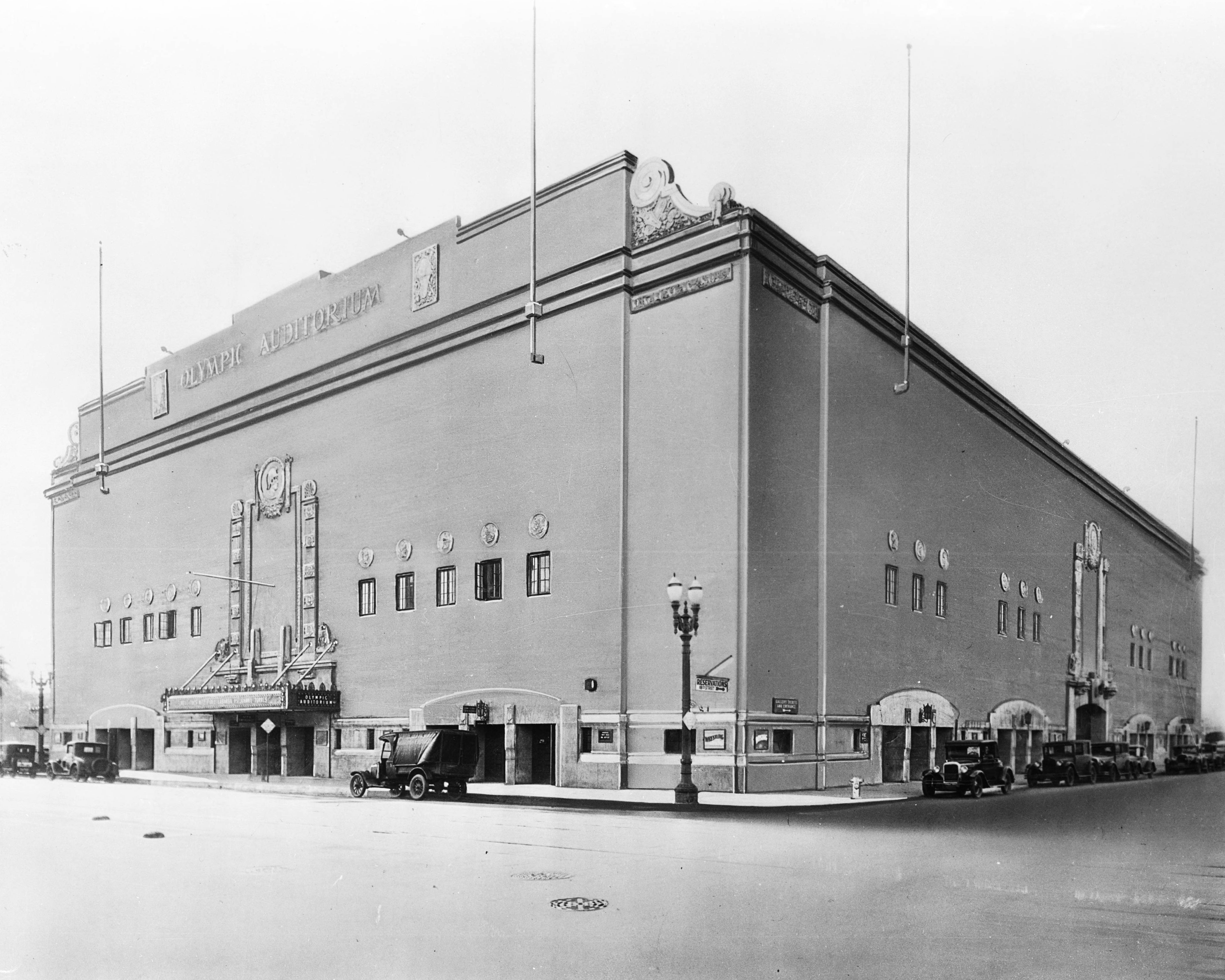
- The Olympic Auditorium, the home base of NWA Hollywood Wrestling.
- Founded: 1958
- Defunct: 1982
- Headquarters: Los Angeles, California, USA
- Founder(s): Cal Eaton; Aileen Eaton
- Owner(s): Cal Eaton and Aileen Eaton (1958–1966); Mike LeBell (1966–1982)
- Formerly: North American Wrestling Alliance (1958–1961); Worldwide Wrestling Associates (1961–1968)

NWA Hollywood Wrestling (sometimes referred to as NWA Los Angeles) was a professional wrestling promotion headquartered in Los Angeles, California in the United States that promoted professional wrestling matches throughout Southern California. It was founded in 1958 as the North American Wrestling Alliance, a member of the National Wrestling Alliance. It broke away from the NWA in 1959 and was renamed Worldwide Wrestling Associates in 1961. In 1968, it rejoined the NWA and adopted its final name, remaining a member until closing in 1982.

== History ==
In 1942, Frank Garbutt, vice president of the Los Angeles Athletic Club, hired former California State Athletic Commission inspector Alvah "Cal" Eaton as the promoter of the Olympic Auditorium at the advice of his secretary, Aileen LeBell. Eaton and LeBell married in 1948, and over the following years the couple became major professional wrestling and boxing promoters in Southern California. By the early-1950s, the Eatons, along with Hugh Nichols, Johnny Doyle, and Mike Hirsch (collectively known as the "California Combine"), dominated professional wrestling in Southern California, leading to a United States Department of Justice antitrust investigation in 1955 and 1956.

On July 24, 1957, Lou Thesz defeated Édouard Carpentier under controversial circumstances to win the NWA World Heavyweight Championship, the principal championship recognized by the National Wrestling Alliance. The decision was challenged by some members of the National Wrestling Alliance who continued to recognize Carpentier as World Heavyweight Champion.

In 1958, the Eatons created the North American Wrestling Alliance as a new vehicle for promoting professional wrestling in Los Angeles. Eaton at the time was still a member of the National Wrestling Alliance, the national league that dominated professional wrestling in the United States, but had not paid dues since 1955. In October 1959, Eaton and LeBell withdrew from the NWA, recognizing Carpentier as the inaugural World Heavyweight Champion backdated to June 14, 1957, when Carpentier had originally won the NWA World Heavyweight Championship. The promotion was renamed Worldwide Wrestling Associates in 1961.

The promotion ran events throughout Southern California, with the Olympic Auditorium as its base. Bookers included Jules Strongbow, Freddie Blassie, Mr. Moto, and Gory Guerrero. The promotion developed a working relationship with the Japan Wrestling Association and New Japan Pro-Wrestling, resulting in many talent exchanges. Aileen Eaton introduced a system of paying wrestlers a proportion of the gate rather than a guaranteed fee, boosting profits and encouraging wrestlers to help promote the events. The promotion also pioneered the use of closed-circuit television to show matches to fans who were unable to secure tickets for live events, an early precursor to the pay-per-view model that emerged in the 1980s.

In 1963, WWA World Heavyweight Champion Bearcat Wright faced Freddie Blassie in a bout that Wright was scripted to lose. Instead, Wright headbutted Blassie, dazing him, and then legitimately pinned him. Wright was subsequently stripped of the championship which was then awarded to Edouard Carpentier.

Eaton died on January 10, 1966, with Aileen's son from a prior marriage Mike LeBell taking over on behalf of his mother, who by then was a major figure in boxing. On August 18, 1968, LeBell rejoined the NWA, renaming the promotion NWA Hollywood Wrestling. The WWA World Heavyweight Championship was abandoned and the promotion began recognizing the NWA World Heavyweight Championship once more.

On August 27, 1971, the promotion set a national gate record for a supercard event at the Los Angeles Memorial Coliseum headed by a bout between Blassie and John Tolos that drew a crowd of 25,847 and $142,158 (equivalent to $1,130,139 in 2025) in gate receipts.

In 1981, the promotion obtained a legacy of sorts by being the first recipient of the Wrestling Observer Newsletter award for Most Disgusting Promotional Tactic. This tactic involved the push of Tony Hernandez, who had previously wrestled in the Arizona territory as "Frankenstein", a crazed man who believed himself to be Frankenstein's monster and even wore a rubber mask depicting the creature. LeBell chose instead to push him as "The Monster", who was billed as legitimately being made in a laboratory, and use him as a top heel. After being defeated by André the Giant (who was reportedly unimpressed by the act and decided to stiff Hernandez), the Monster was unmasked - despite the mask being intended to be his real face - and turned into a child-friendly babyface. This entire arc was seen as insulting by hardcore fans.

NWA Hollywood Wrestling continued to operate until December 1982. Mike LeBell sold his interest in the territory to the World Wrestling Federation, which in March 1983, began promoting shows in its former territory.

== Championships ==
Championship	Created	Abandoned	Notes
NWA Americas Heavyweight Championship	1967	1982	The title was first established in 1967 as a secondary championship in Worldwide Wrestling Associates. From 1968 until the promotion closed in 1982, the top singles championship in NWA Hollywood Wrestling.
NWA Americas Six-Man Tag Team Championship	1969	1969	A short-lived six-man tag team championship contested in NWA Hollywood Wrestling in 1969.
NWA "Beat the Champ" Television Championship	1951	1982	Originally contested in NWA Los Angeles, this championship was abandoned in 1959. In 1968, it was resurrected in NWA Hollywood Wrestling.
NWA Americas Tag Team Championship	1964	1982	Originally known as the WWA World Tag Team Championship. It was created in 1964 and defended in WWA until 1968. At that point, WWA became a National Wrestling Alliance affiliate, and the title was renamed the NWA Americas Tag Team Championship.
NWA North American Tag Team Championship (Los Angeles/Japan version)	1973	1981	Primarily contested in New Japan Pro-Wrestling.
NWA United National Championship	1970	1989	Primarily contested in All Japan Pro Wrestling.
NWA World Tag Team Championship (Los Angeles version)	1957	1982	The original World Tag Team Championship of the NAWA. It was created in 1957 and abandoned in 1958 upon the NAWA leaving the NWA. The championship was reactivated in 1979.
WWA International Television Tag Team Championship	1954	1964	Created in 1954 and abandoned in 1964. Renamed the WWA United States Tag Team Championship in 1963.
WWA World Heavyweight Championship	1957	1968	The title was established as an offshoot of the NWA World Heavyweight Championship when Edouard Carpentier became recognized as champion in Los Angeles, when the promotion was then known as the North American Wrestling Alliance. The championship was renamed with the promotion in 1961 and was abandoned in 1968 after WWA joined the NWA and was renamed NWA Hollywood Wrestling.

== Alumni ==
- Chris Adams
- Buddy Austin
- Freddie Blassie
- Lord James Blears
- Dino Bravo
- Édouard Carpentier
- The Destroyer
- Ric Drasin
- Terry Funk
- Billy Graham
- Chavo Guerrero, Sr.
- Dick Lane (announcer)
- Gene LeBell
- Don Leo Jonathan
- Mil Máscaras
- Ray Mendoza
- Pedro Morales
- Mr. Moto
- Roddy Piper
- Rikidōzan
- Victor Rivera
- The Sheik
- Dennis Stamp
- Sándor Szabó
- Lou Thesz
- John Tolos
- Dale Valentine
- Bearcat Wright

== See also ==
- Championship Wrestling from Hollywood, brief local NWA revival in the 2010s, still running as an unaffiliated promotion
