= NWA Florida Junior Heavyweight Championship =

Professional wrestling championship

Details
- Promotion: Championship Wrestling from Florida (1981–1984) NWA Florida Major League Wrestling (1997–2002); NWA Florida (2002–2003); NWA Championship Wrestling from Florida (Note: Not affiliated with the original CWF) (2003–2005); NWA Mid-West / Pro Wrestling Fusion (2009–2011) NWA Championship Wrestling from Florida (2011–2012)
- Date established: March 5, 1942
- Date retired: September 2012

Other name
- Florida Junior Heavyweight Championship (Note: The championship predates the creation of the National Wrestling Alliance)
Statistics
- First champion: Babe Kasaboski
- Final champion: Justin Cage
- Most reigns: C.B. Kool (3 times)

The NWA Florida Junior Heavyweight Championship was the top title for lighter wrestlers in the National Wrestling Alliance's Florida territory, Championship Wrestling from Florida. The title itself began in 1942, seven years before CWF was founded. The title was abandoned in 1984, before being revived by NWA Florida in 1997.

== Title history ==
Key
No.	Overall reign number
Reign	Reign number for the specific champion
Days	Number of days held

No.	Champion	Championship change			Reign statistics		Notes	Ref.
No.	Champion	Date	Event	Location	Reign	Days	Notes	Ref.
1	Babe Kasaboski	March 5, 1942	CWF Show	Jacksonville, Florida	1	(Note: The length of the championship reign is too uncertain to calculate.)	Defeated Morris Shapiro by disqualification to become the first champion.	
Championship history is unrecorded from March 5, 1942 to September 4, 1944.
2	Bill Ludwig	September 4, 1944	CWF Show	Tampa, Florida	1		Defeated Billy Williams to win the championship	
Championship history is unrecorded from September 4, 1944 to May 1981.
3	Jerry Brisco	May 1981 (nlt)	CWF Show	N/A	1		Defeated Hiro Matsuda in a tournament final to win the championship	
—	Vacated	N/A	—	—	—	—	Championship vacated for undocumented reasons	
4	Hector Guerrero	December 7, 1983	CWF Show	Miami Beach, Florida	1		Defeated Dennis Brown in a tournament final	
Championship history is unrecorded from December 7, 1983 to November 7, 1997.
5	Mike Marcello	November 7, 1997	CWF Show	Gainesville, Florida	1	371	Defeated Jet Jaguar and Pepe Prado in a three-way match to win the championship for NWA Florida Major League Wrestling	
—	Vacated	November 13, 1998	—	—	—	—	Championship vacated after Marcello no-showed a championship match	
6	Buck Quartermaine	November 13, 1998	CWF Show	Gainesville, Florida	1	631	Defeated White Chocolate to win the vacant championship.	
7	Pepe Prado	August 5, 2000	CWF Show	Tampa, Florida	1	101		
8	Lex Lovett	November 14, 2000	CWF Show	Tampa, Florida	1	246		
9	Jet Jaguar	July 18, 2001	CWF Show	Tampa, Florida	1	192		
10	Prince Justice (Note: This was not the character played by Abyss who is too heavy to be a Junior Heavyweight.)	January 26, 2002	CWF Show	St. Petersburg, Florida	1	188		
11	Naphtali	August 2, 2002	CWF Show	St. Petersburg, Florida	1	152		
—	Vacated	January 1, 2003	—	—	—	—	Championship vacated when Naphtali was awarded the NWA Florida X Division Championship	
12	Mr. Wrestling IV	January 25, 2003	CWF Show	Ocoee, Florida	1	112	Defeated Donnie York to win the vacant championship	
—	Vacated	May 17, 2003	—	—	—	—	Championship vacated after Mr. Wrestling IV failed to defend the championship	
13	Talon	May 30, 2003	CWF Show	Ocoee, Florida	1	113	Defeated Joe Woods	
14	C.B. Kool	September 20, 2003	CWF Show	Ocoee, Florida	1	20	Defeated Talon and Rouge in a three-way match	
15	Kevin Rhodes	October 10, 2003	NWA 55th Anniversary Show	Parkersburg, West Virginia	1	36		
16	Rouge	November 15, 2003	CWF Show	Ocoee, Florida	1	0		
17	C.B. Kool	November 15, 2003	CWF Show	Ocoee, Florida	2	28		
18	Kevin Rhodes	December 13, 2003	CWF Show	Ocoee, Florida	2	84	Worked the match as Midnight Rider III, but unmasked afterward.	
19	C.B. Kool	March 6, 2004	CWF Show	Ocoee, Florida	3	175		
20	Remix	August 28, 2004	CWF Show	Orlando, Florida	1	154		
21	Tommy Marr	January 29, 2005	CWF Show	N/A	1	252		
—	Vacated	October 8, 2005	—	—	—	—	Marr vacated the title after winning the NWA North American Heavyweight Championship	
22	Chris Jones	October 2009	CWF Show	N/A	1	(Note: The exact date the championship change took place is uncertain, which mean it lasted between 1 and 23 days.)	Jones defeated Prince Iaukea on March 7, 2009 to become the Pro Wrestling Fusion Heavyweight Champion, then recognized as the NWA Florida Heavyweight Championship in October 2009	
23	Classic	October 23, 2009	CWF Show	Tampa Bay, Florida	1	722		
24	Bobby Fonta	October 15, 2011	CWF Show	Florida	1	270		
25	Justin Cage	July 11, 2012	CWF Show	Orlando, Florida	1	52		
—	Deactivated	September 2012	—	—	—	—	Championship Wrestling from Florida left the NWA and gave up the championship.	

== See also ==
- Championship Wrestling from Florida
- National Wrestling Alliance
- NWA North American Heavyweight Championship
- NWA Florida Heavyweight Championship
