= Kevin Northcutt =

American professional wrestler (born 1973)

Personal information
- Born: March 23, 1973 (age 53) Chalmette, Louisiana, U.S.

Professional wrestling career
- Ring name: Kevin Northcutt
- Billed height: 6 ft 6 in (198 cm)
- Billed weight: 260 lb (118 kg)
- Trained by: Sika Anoa'i; Dusty Wolfe
- Debut: 1994

Kevin Northcutt (born March 23, 1973) is an American retired professional wrestler.

== Professional wrestling career ==
=== World Championship Wrestling (2000) ===
After unsuccessful try-outs with Extreme Championship Wrestling and the World Wrestling Federation in the late 1990s, Northcutt worked for World Championship Wrestling in late 2000 as a jobber, working the likes of Norman Smiley, Mike Awesome and Chuck Palumbo, among others.

=== Total Nonstop Action Wrestling (2003–2004) ===
During his time in Total Nonstop Action Wrestling (TNA) as part of the Red Shirt Security, he won the NWA World Tag Team Championship with Joe E. Legend and held the belts from January 28, 2004 until February 4 of the same year. He was helping Jeff Jarrett and the Red Shirt Security, was the heel security team working for Don Callis, with the Black Shirt Security (Chris Vaughn and Rick Santel) were working for Erik Watts. They engaged in a feud which was never really solved because of the sudden departure of both securities. The Red Shirt Security lost the tag team belts in a match to Abyss and A.J. Styles, even though Abyss had turned on his own partner as he was also working for Don Callis and Jeff Jarrett. He was released from TNA.

=== Independent circuit ===
Northcutt next wrestled on the independent circuit, mostly in Louisiana with Mid South Wrestling Entertainment and Old Skool Wrestling Entertainment. He regained the NWA Texas Heavyweight title by defeating Spoiler 2000, with a pile drive finish in 12 minutes on May 2, 2009, at the Oil Palace in Tyler, Texas. It was his ninth reign since 1999. After 300 days, he vacated the title on February 26, 2010.

== Championships and accomplishments ==
- Canadian Wrestling Federation
  - CWF Heavyweight Championship (1 time)
  - CWF Match of the Year (2004)
- Deep South Wrestling
  - DSW Louisiana Heavyweight Championship (1 time)
- Mid-South Wrestling
  - MSW Heavyweight Championship (1 time)
- Mid-South Wrestling Entertainment
  - MSWE Tag-Team Championship (1 time) - with Marty Graw
- National Wrestling Alliance^{1}
  - NWA National Heavyweight Championship (1 time)
- New South Wrestling Alliance
  - NSWA Heavyweight Championship (1 time)
- NWA Battlezone
  - NWA Mississippi Heavyweight Championship (1 time)
  - NWA North American Tag Team Championship (1 time) - with John Saxon
  - NWA Southern Tag Team Championship (2 times) - with John Saxon
- NWA Southwest
  - NWA National Heavyweight Championship (1 time)
  - NWA Texas Heavyweight Championship (9 times)
  - NWA World Tag Team Championship (1 time) - with Jimmy James
- NWA Total Nonstop Action
  - NWA World Tag Team Championship (1 time) - with Joe Legend
- NWA Universal
  - NWA Texas Heavyweight Championship (1 time)
- Old Skool Wrestling Entertainment
  - OSWE Tag-Team Championship (1 time) - with Marty Graw

^{1}Title was awarded to him and records don't indicate where it was awarded or what promotion he wrestled for at the time.
