= Abyss (wrestler) =

American professional wrestler (born 1973)

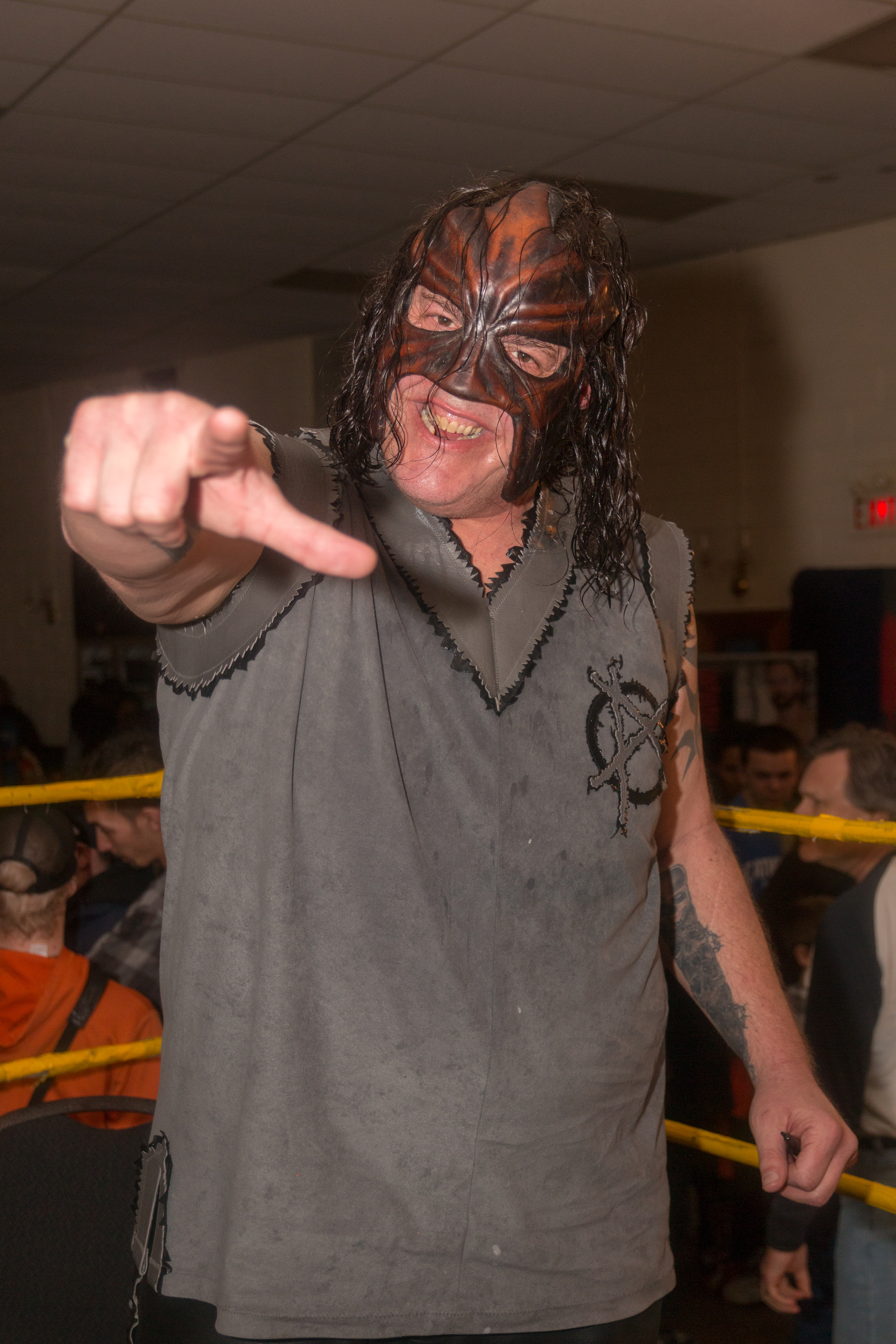
- Abyss in 2018

Personal information
- Born: Christopher Joseph Park; October 4, 1973 (age 53) Washington, D.C., U.S.
- Education: Ohio University
- Spouse: Amber Park (m. 2006)
- Children: 1

Professional wrestling career
- Ring name(s): Abyss; Chris Justice; Chris Parks; Joseph Park; Joseph Park Esq. Justice; The Original Terminator; Prince Justice
- Billed height: 6 ft 8 in (203 cm)
- Billed weight: 350 lb (159 kg)
- Billed from: Parts Unknown; Chicago, Illinois
- Trained by: Roger Ruffen
- Debut: January 19, 1995
- Retired: August 14, 2020

Christopher Joseph Parks (born October 4, 1973), better known by his ring name Abyss, is an American retired professional wrestler, who has been employed by WWE as a producer since January 2019. He is best known for his time with Total Nonstop Action Wrestling (TNA).

He became a one-time NWA World Heavyweight Champion. He is the heaviest wrestler to hold the X Division Championship and was the longest reigning Television Champion. In the tag team division, he held the NWA World Tag Team Championship once with A.J. Styles, and the TNA World Tag Team Championship twice, once with James Storm as The Revolution, and once with Crazzy Steve as Decay.

Having won all the required championships, he was the fourth man to complete the Triple Crown Championship and the second to complete the Grand Slam Championship. He also wrestled in Impact Wrestling as Abyss's storyline brother/split personality, Joseph Park. He was also the longest-tenured member of the Impact Wrestling roster, having remained with the company from 2002 to 2019. In 2018, he was inducted into the Impact Hall of Fame by his longtime manager, James Mitchell.

== Early life ==
Christopher Joseph Park was born in Washington, D.C. He attended St. Joseph High School in Cleveland, Ohio, where he played football. He attended Ohio University, where he played offensive tackle for the Bobcats and eventually earned two degrees, the latter being a master's degree in sports administration.

== Professional wrestling career ==
=== Early career (1995–2002) ===
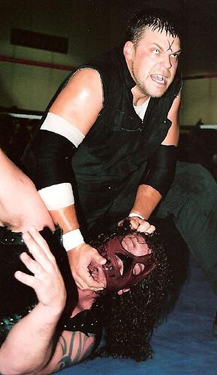
Abyss (masked) wrestling against Michael Sain

Park was trained by Roger Ruffin of the Northern Wrestling Federation (NWF). He won his debut match by disqualification. For the first few years of his career, Park worked in the NWF as the Original Terminator, Chris Justice, and then Prince Justice. In 2001, Parks worked for NWA Wildside, where he won the NWA Wildside Tag Team Championship with A.J. Styles. He also wrestled Jerry Lawler in Memphis Power Pro Championship Wrestling.

=== IWA Puerto Rico, WWC (2002–2004) ===
Park was then discovered by Dutch Mantel, who at the time was booking the IWA Puerto Rico, when Mantel attended the first ever Total Nonstop Action Wrestling (TNA) pay-per-view in Huntsville, Alabama on June 19, 2002. Park appeared at the pay-per-view in the Gauntlet for the Gold match under the ring name Justice. Mantel then booked Park to appear in the IWA. The Abyss character was given by Mantel and first appeared in IWA at Golpe de Estado in July 2002 in front of 13,000 fans at the Roberto Clemente baseball park in Carolina, Puerto Rico, when he attacked and disabled Shane the Glamour Boy, who was scheduled to appear in the main event that night versus Savio Vega. While working for the company, Park held the IWA Hardcore Championship, IWA Intercontinental Heavyweight Championship, and IWA World Tag Team Championship. Park worked in the IWA under Mantel for approximately one year until he rejoined TNA in 2003.

=== Total Nonstop Action Wrestling / Impact Wrestling (2002–2019) ===
==== Early feuds (2002–2005) ====
Chris Park appeared on TNA's first ever weekly pay-per-view show on June 19, 2002, under the moniker Justice. He took part in the Gauntlet For The Gold match to crown a new NWA World Heavyweight Champion but was eliminated.

Park returned to TNA as "The Monster" Abyss in June 2003, debuting as a villain and attacking Erik Watts, although the feud was short lived. Afterward, Park was brought in as a bodyguard to Kid Kash. They continued to be allies until October, when Kash betrayed Abyss for losing a match and Abyss turned on and attacked Kash. Abyss gained a victory over Kash, but then lost a First Blood Steel Chair on a Pole match to his former partner. Soon after the loss the feud between the two ended. Soon after, Abyss aligned himself with Don Callis. With this new alliance, Abyss soon feuded with Raven. The feud lasted for the rest of 2003, with the final match pitting Abyss and the Red Shirt Security (Kevin Northcutt and Legend) against Raven and The Gathering in a Steel Cage match. Abyss and his team came out victorious when the Gathering turned on Raven.

Going into 2004, Abyss entered his first major feud with AJ Styles. On one show, Abyss was forced to team with Styles in an NWA World Tag Team Championship match against champions Red Shirt Security, with Abyss and Styles winning the title. Abyss later defeated Styles to gain control of the title. Afterward, both men fought to a no-contest in a Falls Count Anywhere match. The next show, Abyss defeated Styles again, this time in a ladder match to become the top contender to the NWA World Heavyweight Championship. Abyss lost the right to Raven in a match that also involved Styles and Ron Killings.

About a month after the feud with Styles, Abyss received a new manager, Goldy Locks. She used Abyss to defeat her ex-boyfriend Erik Watts to win his contract. She kept using Abyss to win contracts for her, while also adding Alex Shelley to her group to assist. Watts later returned for revenge, with Abyss, Shelley, and Goldy Locks taking on Watts, Sonny Siaki, and Desire in a Six-Person Mixed Tag Team match. During the match, Abyss turned on his team by attacking Goldy Locks. Not long after separating from Goldy Locks, Abyss began to feud with Monty Brown and Raven. The feud escalated into the first-ever Monster's Ball match at TNA's first monthly pay-per-view, Victory Road on November 7. At Victory Road, Brown won the match when he pinned Raven. Abyss and Brown continued to feud until they met in a Serengeti Survival match at Turning Point on December 5, when Brown again came out victorious.

Abyss then appeared at Final Resolution on January 16, 2005, attacking Jeff Hardy. This attack led to a Full Metal Mayhem match between the two at Against All Odds on February 13 with the winner becoming the top contender to the NWA World Heavyweight Championship. Abyss won the match. In the rematch at Destination X on March 13 in a Falls Count Anywhere match, Hardy won. Abyss then set his sights on the NWA World Heavyweight Championship, and he wrestled A.J. Styles for the #1 contendership at Lockdown on April 24 in a Six Sides of Steel match. Styles won the match and the contendership, and Park suffered a separated shoulder. He, however, returned to action in the Gauntlet for the Gold match at Hard Justice on May 15. With this win, he gave himself entry into the King of the Mountain match at Slammiversary on June 19, pitting him against NWA World Heavyweight Champion A.J. Styles, Monty Brown, Raven, and Sean Waltman with the NWA World Heavyweight Championship on the line, which Raven won.

==== Storyline with James Mitchell (2005–2008) ====
Abyss, not happy with the loss, attacked Raven on the following Impact!, and got Raven's old nemesis, James Mitchell as Abyss's new manager. After weeks of attacks, Raven attempted to gain revenge on Abyss in a Steel Chain Dog Collar match under No Surrender rules at No Surrender on July 17 with the NWA World Heavyweight Championship on the line. In the end, Raven pinned Abyss to retain the title. Abyss was not happy and showed it by attacking Lance Hoyt on the following Impact, setting up a match at Sacrifice on August 14. Abyss defeated Hoyt at Sacrifice, and during the main event, attacked Sabu. With the war beginning, Abyss and Sabu met in a No Disqualification match at Unbreakable on September 11, with Abyss defeating Sabu. They battled again at Bound for Glory on October 23 in the Monster's Ball II match that also involved Jeff Hardy and Rhino, with Rhino winning the encounter. During the match, Jeff Hardy gave Abyss a Swanton Bomb through a table from approximately 22 ft 0in. Abyss and Sabu continued to fight, leading to another No Disqualification match at Genesis on November 13, with Abyss again defeating Sabu. Due to interference from Sabu, Abyss lost to Jeff Hardy on the November 26 episode of Impact!. A Barbed Wire Massacre match at Turning Point on December 11 ended the feud. The match was voted TNA's 2005 Match of the Year. In the end, Sabu won the contest, getting his first pinfall over Abyss.

To close out the year, Abyss and Mitchell joined Planet Jarrett. As a favor to Scott D'Amore, Mitchell agreed to have Abyss take care of Rhino. Abyss and Rhino wrestled at Final Resolution on January 15, 2006, with Abyss coming out victorious. They had another match at Against All Odds on February 12 in a Falls Count Anywhere match, which Rhino won. The feud ended at Destination X on March 12, with Abyss teaming with Jeff Jarrett and America's Most Wanted against Rhino, Ron Killings, and Team 3D in an Eight Man Tag Team War match. Abyss and his allies won when Jarrett pinned Killings. Now that Rhino was out of the way, Abyss and Mitchell set their sights on NWA World Heavyweight Champion Christian Cage, including stalking his wife for several weeks. This storyline set up an NWA World Heavyweight Championship match at Lockdown on April 23 in a Six Sides of Steel match in the main event. Cage won and retained the title, but Abyss attacked him and stole the belt. At Sacrifice on May 14 in a Full Metal Mayhem match, Abyss lost to Cage, who regained his belt. Abyss got one more title shot, however, by qualifying for the King of the Mountain match at Slammiversary on June 18 by defeating Rhino in a qualifying match. The match also included NWA World Heavyweight Champion Christian Cage, Ron Killings, Jeff Jarrett, and Sting. At Slammiversary, Jarrett won the match.

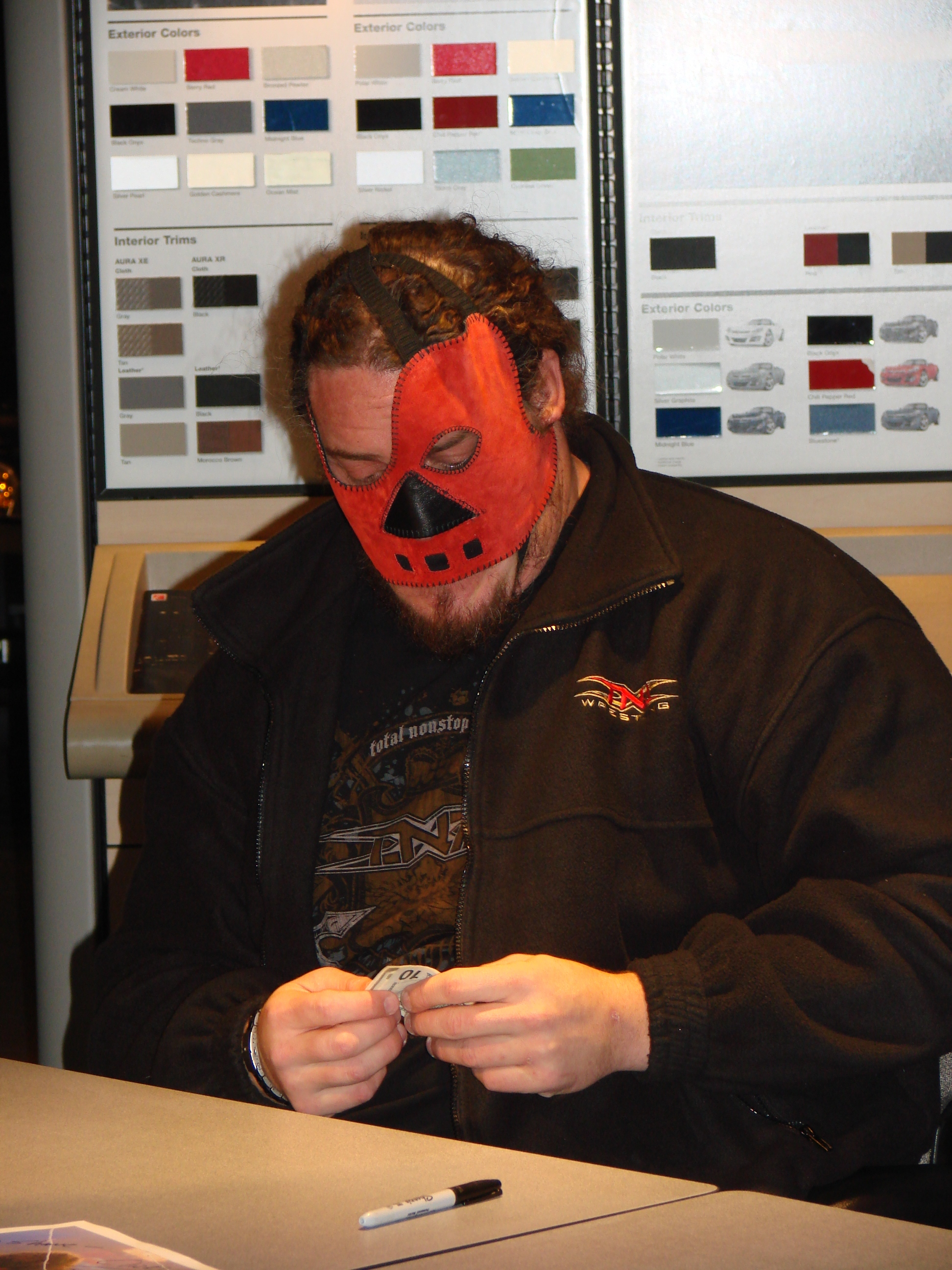
Park as Abyss in Total Nonstop Action Wrestling

After Abyss dropped out of the title picture, his services were requested by The James Gang to help them take on Team 3D, which Mitchell accepted on Abyss's behalf. The two teams faced off at Victory Road on July 16 in a Six-Man Tag Team match. Abyss and The James Gang won after Abyss pinned Brother Runt. Brother Runt continued to feud with Abyss, challenging him to a match at Hard Justice on August 13, which Abyss accepted. In the end, Abyss came out the winner. Abyss and Runt still battled after this match, with Abyss defeating Runt in a Thumbtacks match on Impact!. After the match, Abyss was attacked by Raven, which led to a Hangman's Horror match on another episode of Impact!, in which Abyss came out as the winner. Abyss went on to defeat Raven and Runt at No Surrender on September 24 in a No Disqualification three-way match. Abyss continue to feud with Runt and Raven, while also going after Samoa Joe. Joe stole the NWA World Heavyweight Championship belt, and Abyss's services were offered by James Mitchell to TNA Management to retrieve the belt, which they accepted. Abyss failed to retrieve the belt, but a match was set at Bound for Glory on October 22: a Monster's Ball match featuring Abyss, Brother Runt, Raven, and Samoa Joe. Soon after the announcement, Jake "The Snake" Roberts was announced as the special guest referee for the match. At Bound for Glory, Abyss lost when Joe pinned Raven. Abyss once again had his eyes on the NWA World Heavyweight Championship, competing in the Fight for the Right Tournament, winning the tournament to face Sting at Genesis on November 19 for the NWA World Heavyweight Championship. Abyss defeated Sting at Genesis via disqualification to become the new NWA World Heavyweight Champion. Following Genesis, Sting tried to reason with Abyss and turn him away from Mitchell, referring to Abyss as "Chris". Christian Cage soon interjected himself into this, claiming to know a secret from Abyss's past and attacked both him and Sting. Abyss successfully defended the NWA World Heavyweight Championship at Turning Point on December 10 against Sting and Cage in a three-way match.

At Final Resolution on January 14, 2007, Abyss lost the NWA World Heavyweight Championship in a three-way elimination match against Sting and Christian Cage, after being the first man eliminated from the match and afterwards cost Sting the match. On the January 24 episode of Impact!, Sting revealed (after looking through public records, and once again using Abyss' real name) that Abyss had been in prison for shooting his father in the back three times, sending him into a coma which he survived. At Against All Odds on February 11, Abyss lost to Sting in a Prison Yard match, with Sting taking out Mitchell after the match. At Destination X on March 11, Abyss again lost to Sting in a Last Rites match. On the March 22 episode of Impact!, Abyss teamed with Sting to face Christian Cage and A.J. Styles. During the match, Mitchell returned with a woman who Abyss recognized. Abyss left with Mitchell and the woman, leaving Sting alone to fight Cage and Styles. The following week on Impact!, during a meeting between Sting and James Mitchell, it was revealed that the woman was Abyss's mother, and that she was the one who had actually shot Abyss's father, but Abyss took the blame to protect his mother. With Mitchell threatening to call the police and tell them the truth, Abyss was forced to obey him. As a result, at Lockdown on April 15, Abyss joined "Team Cage" (Christian Cage, A.J. Styles, Scott Steiner, and Tomko) to face Team Angle (Kurt Angle, Samoa Joe, Rhino, Sting, and Jeff Jarrett) in a Lethal Lockdown match, which Team Angle won. On the following Impact!, after Abyss and Cage failed to win the NWA World Tag Team Championship from Team 3D, Abyss finally had enough, and turned face by giving James Mitchell a Black Hole Slam. But after Abyss got his bag of tacks and dumped them on the mat to chokeslam Mitchell on to them Cage, Styles, Steiner and Tomko attacked Abyss, beating him with a chair and a barbed wire baseball bat, which in the storyline, put him out of action.

On the June 14 episode of Impact!, Abyss returned, losing a King of the Mountain qualifying match to Cage by disqualification. Following the match, Abyss attacked the referee, security, and several members of TNA staff while Cage escaped. At Slammiversary on June 17, Abyss gained a measure of revenge on Cage, defeating his ally Tomko in a No Disqualification match that ended after he gave Tomko the Black Hole Slam onto glass. After Slammiversary, Abyss aligned himself with former rival Sting and spoke for the first time in TNA, saying "Tomko... Styles... 3 days... Click... DOOMSDAY!", the phrase used by former manager James Mitchell. Abyss and Sting defeated Tomko and A.J. Styles at Victory Road on July 15, but not without receiving a message from James Mitchell himself, telling the two that his son, Judas Mesias, was coming to TNA. Abyss and Sting continued to feud with Christian's Coalition after the event. On the July 26 episode of Impact Abyss battled Styles in a No Disqualification match. During the match Abyss was dragged under the ring and when he re-appeared, he was covered in blood. Styles pinned Abyss after Tomko had slammed him onto a pile of thumbtacks and broken glass. The following week Abyss and Sting defeated Cage and Styles in a ladder match, after an assist from the debuting Andrew Martin. By winning the match, Abyss could make a match against Cage, picking a Doomsday Chamber of Blood match at Hard Justice on August 12 with Abyss teaming with Sting and Martin to face Cage, Tomko, and Styles. At Hard Justice, Abyss's team would win the match when Abyss pinned Styles, thus earning Abyss the number one contendership to the TNA World Heavyweight Championship. The following Impact!, Abyss successfully defended his contendership against Cage in a First Blood match, but was attacked by TNA World Heavyweight Champion, Kurt Angle. The last Impact! before the event had Abyss score a pinfall victory over Angle in a tag team match, where he teamed with Jay Lethal to face Angle and Sting. At No Surrender on September 9, Abyss fell to Angle after tapping out to the ankle lock. Following the bout, James Mitchell appeared, and a hand ripped through the ring and dragged Abyss into the ring. Abyss faced Angle in a rematch on the following Impact!, this time in a Six Sides of Steel match. Abyss had Angle in Angle's ankle lock maneuver, when Judas Mesias appeared, coming out through the ring and attacking Abyss. Angle escaped, while Mesias choked out Abyss with barbed wire in the ring. Two weeks later Abyss returned to attack Mesias and Angle, who were assaulting Sting and Rhino.

Mesias then suffered an injury outside TNA, leaving Mitchell to enlist the aid of Raven and Black Reign to feud with Abyss and Rhino. The four battled at Bound for Glory on October 14 in a Monster's Ball match, with Abyss picking up the victory with a pinfall over Raven. Following the event, Abyss battled against Mitchell and Black Reign, with Black Reign and Abyss attacking each other on several occasions. Black Reign, after an attack by Abyss, challenged Abyss to a Shop of Horrors match at Genesis on November 11, which Abyss accepted and won. After the match, Abyss was attacked and thrown off the stage by Black Reign and a mysterious wrestler, later identified as Rellik. Following the event, Abyss continued to feud with Black Reign and Rellik and brought in Rhino to help him even. This rivalry led to a Match of 10,000 Tacks with Abyss and Rhino teaming up to take on Black Reign and Rellik booked for Turning Point on December 2. Rhino could not make the event due to a legitimate neck injury caused by Rellik during a match on Impact!, so Abyss chose Raven as his new partner. Abyss and Raven won the match after Abyss performed the Black Hole Slam on Rellik on the thumbtacks.

During the weeks following Turning Point, Mitchell threatened to reveal "a dark secret" of Abyss's past. When Mitchell demanded Abyss tell the world the dark secret of his past, Abyss refused stating "The secret lives with me and it dies with me!". Abyss then went to chokeslam Mitchell, which prompted the return of Judas Mesias. Following this event, Abyss and Mesias had a hardcore match at Final Resolution on January 6, 2008, which Mesias won after a Straight to Hell onto a steel chair wrapped in barbed wire. After the match, Father James Mitchell ordered Mesias to restrain Abyss. Mitchell again demanded Abyss tell the world the dark secret of his past. Abyss refused yet again, and Mitchell attempted to set him on fire. The storyline continued when Mitchell revealed on the January 17 episode of Impact! that he was Abyss's father and Judas Mesias was his half-brother. The next week, Abyss issued a challenge to face Mitchell and Mesias in a Barbed Wire Massacre at Against All Odds on February 10, where Abyss defeated his on-screen half-brother by performing a Black Hole Slam onto a barbed wire board.

==== Teaming and feuding with Matt Morgan (2008–2009) ====
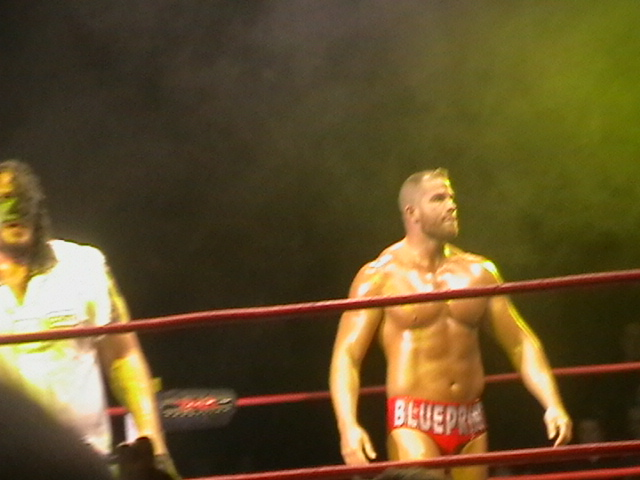
Abyss teamed with Matt Morgan in late 2008

On the February 14 episode of Impact!, Abyss, who was scheduled for a match against Scott Steiner, left the ring before the match, because of the beating he took at Against All Odds, but before leaving through the tunnel, Abyss, without showing his face, took off his mask. The official TNA website then took Abyss off the roster list. In the following weeks, vignettes of Abyss were shown where he was locked in an asylum. Abyss returned to action at Slammiversary on June 8 after the X Division Championship match wearing a white asylum uniform with his inmate number and his last name 'Park' on the back and a new gray and black mask. He came to the ring attacking X Division Champion Petey Williams, Scott Steiner, and Rhaka Khan by performing a Black Hole Slam on each of them, and then carrying Kaz out of the arena.

Subsequently, Abyss did not have any matches, but made after-match run-ins to save other faces from assaults by heels. He issued an open challenge on the September 4 episode of Impact! to anyone in the locker room, which was accepted by Team 3D on behalf of Johnny Devine in a hardcore match. After nailing Devine with a chokeslam, Team 3D attacked Abyss, which caused Matt Morgan, whom Abyss had previously saved, to make a rescue. He handed Abyss a chair to attack Team 3D, but Abyss threw it away and left the ring. Abyss and Morgan though would unite as a team to counter the attacks of Team 3D. The two teams met at No Surrender on September 14 in a match, which Morgan and Abyss won. At Bound for Glory IV on October 12, Abyss and Morgan competed in a four-way tag team Monster's Ball for the Tag Team Championship against Team 3D, The Latin American Xchange and Beer Money, Inc. (Robert Roode and James Storm), but came up short after Roode pinned Hernandez. During the match Abyss was powerbombed through a flaming table by Team 3D, which in storyline, caused Abyss to have third-degree burns and was sent to the hospital later that night and was treated for the burns. On the November 6 episode of Impact!, Abyss along with Matt Morgan won a four-team ladder match to earn a future shot at TNA World Tag Team Champions Beer Money, Inc. At Genesis on January 11, 2009, they lost in a three-way title match, which also included new champions Lethal Consequences (Jay Lethal and Consequences Creed), when Abyss accidentally hit Morgan with a chair. On the January 23 episode of Impact!, Morgan hit Abyss in the head with a steel chair, which allowed Beer Money Inc. to retain the tag team titles, thus ending their partnership. Abyss defeated Morgan in a match at Against All Odds on February 8, but lost the subsequent rematches: a Match of 10,000 Tacks at Destination X on March 15, and a Doomsday Chamber of Blood Match at Lockdown on April 19.

==== Feud with Dr. Stevie (2009–2010) ====
The latter ended in a loss when Abyss's "therapist", Dr. Stevie, interfered in the match, by attacking Abyss when he was on the verge of using weapons against Morgan. Dr. Stevie had appeared in many therapy segments with Abyss up to that point, in which he would attempt to help Abyss get over his addiction to violence; sometimes going as far as to beat him. At the following pay-per-view, Sacrifice on May 24, Dr. Stevie booked the first ever Knockout's Monster's Ball match, in which Abyss would be in the corner of Daffney, another patient of Stevie's, opposite Taylor Wilde, the best friend of Abyss's "girlfriend", Lauren. Abyss turned on Dr. Stevie after the match, after Stevie first told him to attack Wilde and then threatened Lauren, at which point he grabbed Dr. Stevie and chokeslammed him onto a pile of tacks. Abyss went on later to team up with Taylor Wilde at Slammiversary on June 21 to defeat Raven and Daffney in the first ever mixed tag team Monster's Ball match. Over the following month the feud between Abyss and Dr. Stevie continued, with Stevie kidnapping Lauren and shocking Abyss with a taser. At Victory Road on July 19, Abyss came to the ring in a new costume, having discarded the Asylum patient attire. Abyss went on to defeat Dr. Stevie by hitting a Shock Treatment, a Black Hole Slam and by shocking Stevie with his own taser. On the July 30 episode of Impact! enraged Stevie announced that he was not done with Abyss and placed a $50,000 bounty on his head. After Lethal Consequences and Jethro Holliday tried and failed to collect the bounty, Kevin Nash successfully defended his TNA Legends Championship against Abyss at No Surrender on September 20 and claimed the $50,000 bounty in the process. On the September 24 episode of Impact! Abyss's mentor Mick Foley turned on him during and after a TNA World Tag Team Championship match against Booker T and Scott Steiner. Foley revealed Abyss as the one who tore up his picture and beat him to a bloody pulp with a video tape and the baseball bat wrapped in barbed wire. Abyss then challenged Foley to a Monster's Ball match which Foley accepted, but only after adding Dr. Stevie as the referee of the match. At Bound for Glory on October 18, Abyss defeated Foley in the Monster's Ball match after counting the pinfall with the hand of the unconscious Dr. Stevie. Two weeks later Abyss defeated Dr. Stevie via pinfall. After the match Dr. Stevie attacked Abyss with a kendo stick when Mick Foley came to the ring to assist Dr. Stevie. Foley had Stevie hold up Abyss while Foley aligned himself up with a shot at Abyss with a kendo stick when Foley intentionally hit Dr. Stevie instead. Foley walked up the ramp without any reasoning for assisting Abyss. The following week, Foley explained that he had played Dr. Stevie all along and had challenged Abyss to a match at Bound for Glory in order to test how tough he really was, seemingly returning to being a face. Afterwards Foley booked a match between Abyss and Stevie for the following week with the added stipulation that if Stevie lost the match, he would have to leave TNA. On the November 12 episode of Impact! Raven returned to TNA, saved Stevie's future in the company, by costing Abyss a match against him and threw a fireball on Foley's face. During Abyss and Foley's feud with Stevie and Raven TNA shot an angle, in which Stevie set Abyss on fire, that Spike wouldn't let them air on the channel and therefore had to be aired on the company's website. At Final Resolution on December 20 Abyss and Foley defeated Stevie and Raven in a "Foley's Funhouse" tag team match to end the feud.

==== Immortal (2010–2012) ====
When Hulk Hogan and Eric Bischoff took over TNA at the beginning of 2010, Abyss's TNA career was thrown into question by Bischoff, when Mick Foley refused to work with him. When Foley finally agreed to work with Bischoff, he was booked to face Abyss at Against All Odds on February 14 in a No Disqualification match as part of the 8 Card Stud Tournament, with the added stipulation that if a barbed wire baseball bat was not used during the match, Abyss would lose his mask on the following episode of Impact!. Abyss defeated Foley with the Black Hole Slam, just as he was going to use the bat. In the semifinals of the tournament, Abyss was defeated by Mr. Anderson.

On the following episode of Impact! Bischoff, with help from Desmond Wolfe, Homicide, Raven, Rhino and Tomko, tried to remove Abyss's mask, only for him to be saved by Hulk Hogan. An exasperated Hogan took Abyss to his office, gave him a pep talk about how he once was the most feared man in the company, and how sick he is of him being a neurotic mess. He offered his guidance and then his Hall of Fame ring and said that it would make Abyss a god of wrestling. On the March 8 Monday night episode of Impact! Abyss teamed up with Hogan in his in-ring TNA debut, a tag team match against Styles and Flair, who was also making his in-ring TNA debut. Abyss won the match by pinning Styles with a Black Hole Slam. Afterwards, the returning Jeff Hardy saved Abyss and Hogan from a beatdown at the hands of Styles, Flair and Desmond Wolfe. At Destination X on March 21, Abyss failed in his attempt to win the TNA World Heavyweight Championship from Styles, when referee Earl Hebner threw the match out after Abyss chokeslammed Styles through the ring.

The following day on Impact! Abyss was announced as the captain of Team Hogan in the annual Lethal Lockdown match, where they would meet Team Flair, captained by Sting. At Lockdown on April 18, Abyss, Jeff Jarrett, Rob Van Dam and Jeff Hardy defeated Sting, Desmond Wolfe, Robert Roode and James Storm. On the April 26 episode of Impact! Abyss defeated Ric Flair in a match, where Flair's and Hogan's Hall of Fame rings were at stake and as a result Flair lost possession of his ring to Hogan. On the May 3 episode of Impact!, Abyss aided Jay Lethal, who had been given possession of Flair's ring, Rob Van Dam, Team 3D, and Hulk Hogan fight off Ric Flair, AJ Styles, Beer Money, and Desmond Wolfe. Later that night, Abyss lost a Monster's Ball match to AJ Styles, after Flair and Desmond Wolfe's valet Chelsea interfered in the match. The following week Abyss was given a shot at the TNA Global Championship, but was unable to compete after being arrested for allegedly assaulting Chelsea. Later in the night it was revealed that Chelsea and Wolfe, who was scheduled to face Abyss at Sacrifice on May 16, had set Abyss up. At Sacrifice Abyss defeated Wolfe to win Chelsea's services for 30 days. The following month at Slammiversary VIII on June 13, Chelsea turned on Wolfe and helped Abyss defeat him in a Monster's Ball match.

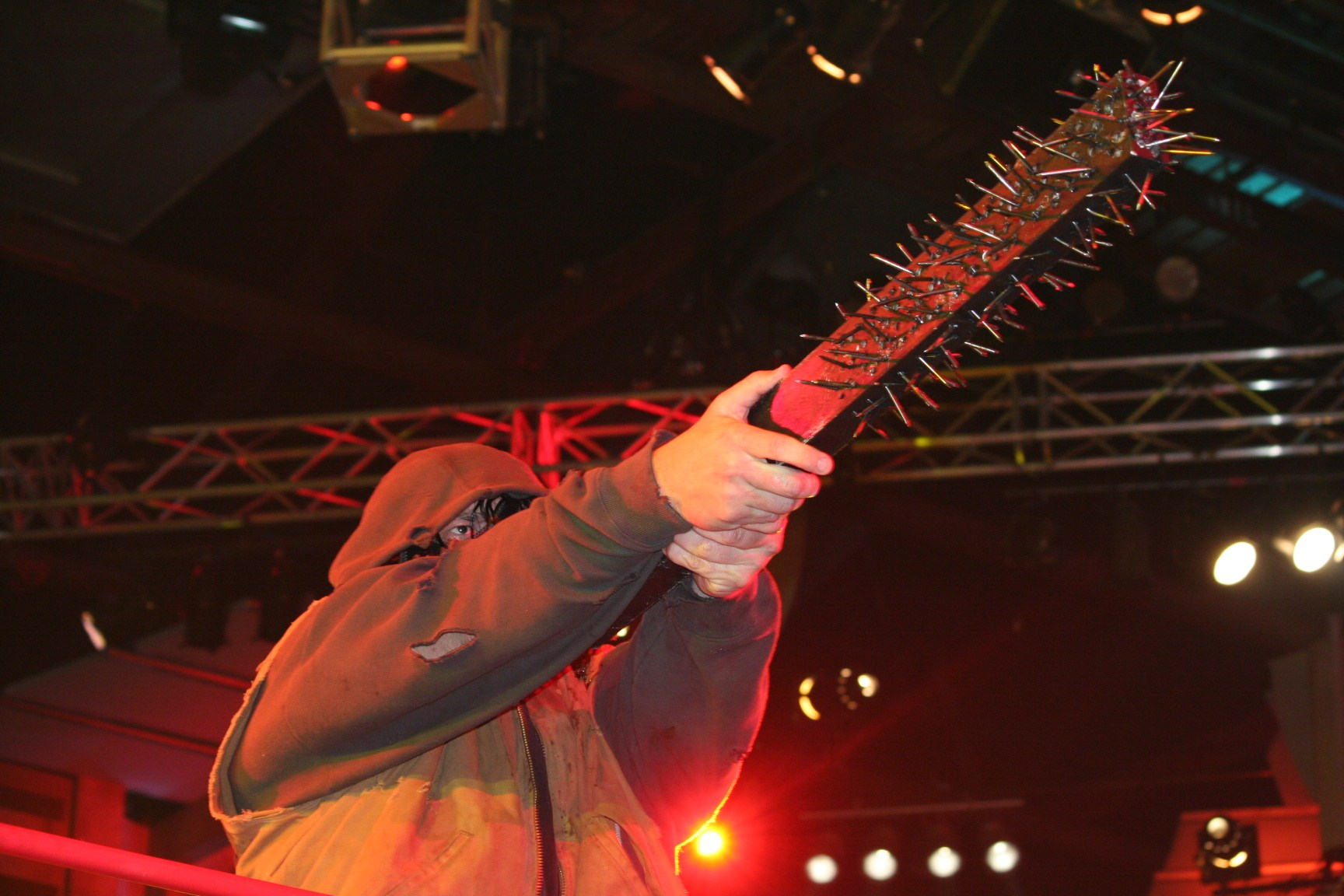
Abyss holding Janice in July 2010

On the following episode of Impact!, Abyss was forced to give Chelsea's custody back to Desmond Wolfe, much to the reluctance of Chelsea. Later in the night, he competed in a three-way match against Mr. Anderson and Jeff Hardy to determine a number one contender to Rob Van Dam's TNA World Heavyweight Championship, which ended in a triple countout. After the match, Abyss turned heel by destroying both of his opponents and having a heated confrontation with Hogan. The following week Abyss revealed that he was being controlled by an entity, who was coming to TNA, before returning Hogan's Hall of Fame ring to him, shoving it down his throat. On the July 15 episode of Impact! the new top ten rankings were revealed with Abyss picking up the top spot to become the new number one contender to Rob Van Dam's TNA World Heavyweight Championship. Abyss then began going after Van Dam with a new weapon, a board filled with nails, which he named Janice, which led to Eric Bischoff booking him and Van Dam to face each other in a Stairway to Janice match for the TNA World Heavyweight Championship, with Bischoff himself serving as the referee of the match. The match took place on the August 12 episode of Impact!, when Van Dam defeated Abyss to retain the title. After the match Abyss joined Fourtune members A.J. Styles, Kazarian, Robert Roode, James Storm, Douglas Williams and Matt Morgan in assaulting Van Dam and the rest of EV 2.0, a stable consisting of former Extreme Championship Wrestling performers, during which he apparently hit Van Dam with Janice. As a result of the attack Van Dam was sidelined with a storyline injury, which forced him to vacate the TNA World Heavyweight Championship the following week. This led to people like Jeff Hardy, Hulk Hogan and members of EV 2.0 targeting Abyss in order to avenge their fallen friend. At No Surrender on September 5, Abyss defeated EV 2.0 member Rhino in a Falls Count Anywhere match. Rob Van Dam returned on the September 23 episode of Impact!, confronting Abyss and demanding a match against him at Bound for Glory on October 10, which Eric Bischoff agreed to give him. Later that same night Abyss attacked Jeff Hardy, trying to make an example out of him, while also beating down the heavily taped up Van Dam, when he tried to make the save. On the October 7 live episode of Impact! Abyss was about to be fired by Bischoff for manhandling TNA president Dixie Carter, but was saved by Van Dam, who threatened to quit the company if he wasn't allowed to face Abyss at Bound for Glory. Later in the night Carter agreed to let Van Dam face Abyss, but signed papers to have Abyss fired from TNA the day following the pay–per–view. At Bound for Glory Van Dam defeated Abyss in a Monster's Ball match, after using Janice on him. At the end of the event it was revealed that the entity, who had been controlling Abyss, was an alliance of Hulk Hogan, Eric Bischoff, Jeff Jarrett and the new TNA World Heavyweight Champion Jeff Hardy, all of whom turned heel and aligned themselves with Abyss. On the following episode of Impact! the stable was named Immortal, as it formed an alliance with Ric Flair's Fortune. Afterwards, Abyss began attacking planted fans, which led to D'Angelo Dinero challenging him to a Lumberjack match. The match took place at Turning Point on November 7, where Dinero's own brother and the rest of his lumberjacks turned on him, after being bought out by Eric Bischoff, and helped Abyss pick up the win. The following month at Final Resolution on December 5, Abyss defeated Dinero in a casket match. On January 9, 2011, at Genesis Abyss replaced an injured A.J. Styles and defeated Douglas Williams, with help from an interfering Styles, to win the TNA Television Championship for the first time. On the January 20 episode of Impact!, as Immortal was attacking Kurt Angle, Crimson made the save for him and hit Abyss in the back with Janice, causing him storyline injuries, which indefinitely sidelined him from TNA.

During his time away from TNA, Abyss was stripped of the TNA Television Championship on March 14 at the tapings of the March 17 episode of Impact!. Abyss returned at the following day's tapings of the March 24 episode of Impact!, attacking Fortune, who had recently turned on Immortal. On the April 14 episode of Impact!, Abyss took revenge on Crimson, interfering in his match and chokeslamming him onto a guardrail. On April 17 at Lockdown, Immortal, represented by Abyss, Bully Ray, Matt Hardy and Ric Flair, was defeated by Fortune members James Storm, Kazarian and Robert Roode and Christopher Daniels, replacing an injured A.J. Styles, in a Lethal Lockdown match. At Sacrifice on May 15, Abyss was defeated by Crimson in a singles match. On May 16 at the tapings of the May 19 episode of Impact Wrestling, Abyss defeated Kazarian to win the TNA X Division Championship for the first time, continuing Eric Bischoff's war on the X Division. The win also made him a Triple Crown and Grand Slam Champion. With his new title, which he dubbed the Xtreme Championship, Abyss dropped Janice, claiming to no longer need it, and started a new gimmick, which involved him reading and quoting Sun Tzu's The Art of War. On June 12 at Slammiversary IX, Abyss successfully defended the title in a three-way match against Kazarian and Brian Kendrick. On July 10 at Destination X, Abyss lost the X Division Championship to Brian Kendrick. Abyss received his rematch for the title in an Ultimate X match on the July 28 episode of Impact Wrestling, but was unable to regain the title. Abyss's X Division storyline concluded two weeks later on Impact Wrestling, when Eric Bischoff, at the orders of "The Network", ended his war with the division and introduced a 225 lb (102 kg) weight limit to it. Abyss's losing streak continued on August 7 at Hardcore Justice, where he was pinned by A.J. Styles in a six-man tag team match between Immortal and Fortune, after which his stablemates abandoned him in the ring. On the October 13 episode of Impact Wrestling, Abyss turned on Immortal and was afterwards beaten down by his former stablemates.

Abyss wrestled his first match back as a face on the October 20 episode of Impact Wrestling, defeating former stablemate Gunner via countout, when he fled the ring. On November 13 at Turning Point, Abyss and Mr. Anderson defeated their former Immortal stablemates Bully Ray and Scott Steiner in a tag team match. In December, a random draw placed Abyss and Steiner in the same team for the Wild Card Tournament. After defeating Hernandez and Rob Terry in their first-round match, the team was eliminated from the tournament, after Abyss turned on Steiner in their semifinal match against A.J. Styles and Kazarian. Afterwards, Abyss agreed to rejoin Immortal, should Bully Ray be able to defeat him in a Monster's Ball match. On January 8, 2012, at Genesis, Abyss defeated Ray in the Monster's Ball match, but was assaulted backstage following the victory.

==== Joseph Park (2012–2014) ====
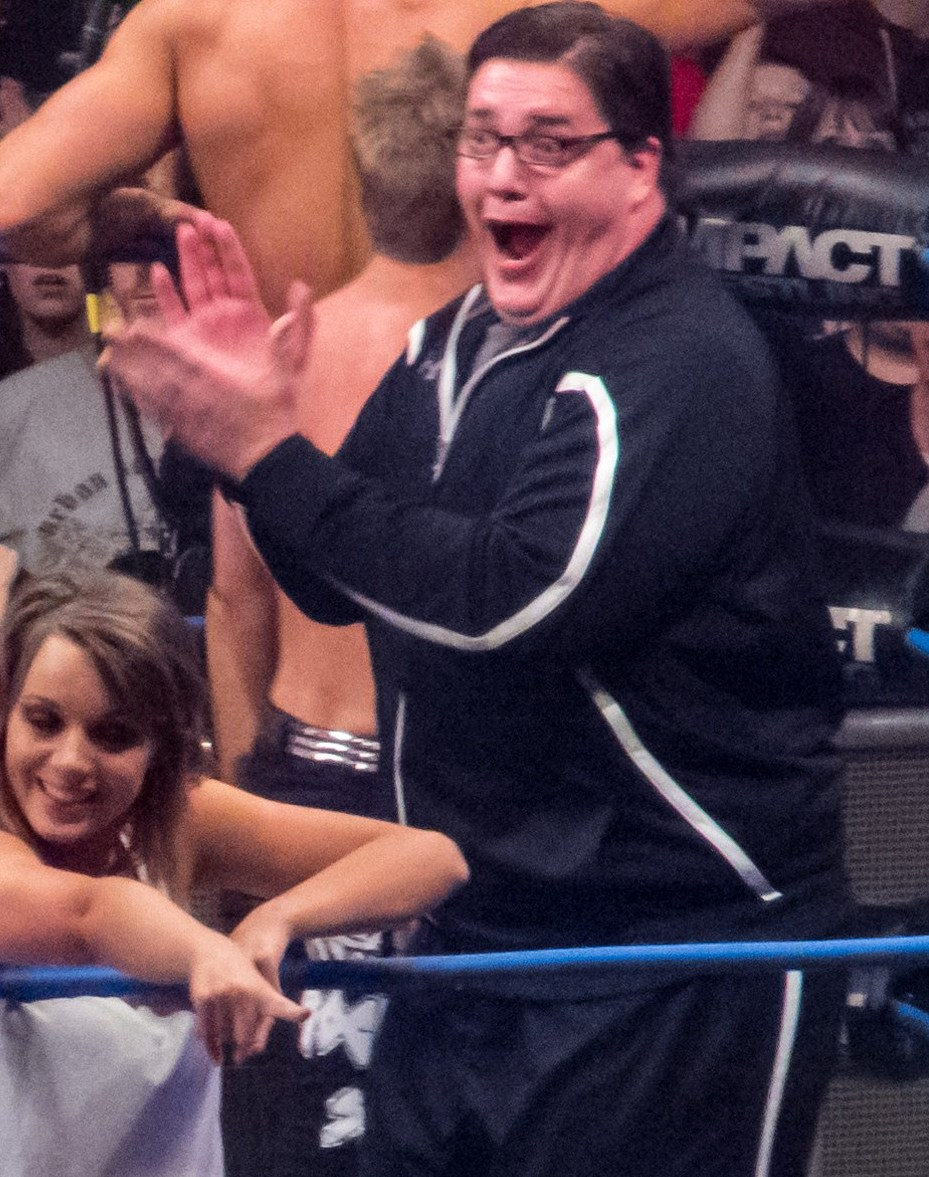
In 2012, Park took up the gimmick of Joseph Park, Abyss's brother

On the March 8 episode of Impact Wrestling, Park appeared without his mask, introducing himself as Joseph Park, the brother of Abyss. He stated that he was searching for his brother, who had been missing since the Genesis event. Park continued to make appearances over the following weeks, eventually accusing Bully Ray of being responsible for his brother’s disappearance. This storyline culminated with Abyss returning on the May 10 episode of Impact Wrestling, where he warned Joseph Park that he was "getting too close to the fire." On the June 7 episode of Impact Wrestling, Park agreed to wrestle Bully Ray at Slammiversary for his brother, which led to Abyss making an appearance through a video, threatening both Park and Ray. Three days later at Slammiversary, Park defeated Ray in an Anything Goes match, following interference from Abyss. On the July 12 episode of Impact Wrestling, Park and Bully Ray faced off in an Anything Goes match. Ray won the bout after striking Park with a chain. However, after the match, seeing his own blood, Park attacked Ray and delivered Abyss's signature Black Hole Slam. On the September 20 episode of Impact Wrestling, Park was kidnapped by the Aces & Eights stable, who used him to force Hulk Hogan into allowing the group to wrestle for TNA roster spots at Bound for Glory. On the October 25 episode of Impact Wrestling, Park and Hogan engaged in a discussion where Park expressed his desire for revenge against Aces & Eights. He even presented Hogan with a legal contract authorizing him to take any measures he deems necessary against the group. On the November 1 episode of Impact Wrestling, Park got a measure of revenge of his kidnappers by unmasking one of the members of Aces & Eights during a brawl between the stable and the TNA locker room. However, immediately afterwards, the now unmasked DOC put Park through a table, which led to Park asking for a match against a member of the stable the following week. Park received his match against DOC on November 11 at Turning Point, where he was unsuccessful. On the following episode of Impact Wrestling, Park announced he was going to Ohio Valley Wrestling and train to become a wrestler. Park returned on the January 10, 2013, episode of Impact Wrestling, asking Hulk Hogan for a match against a member of Aces & Eights, which he was granted. Three days later at Genesis, Park was defeated by Aces & Eights member and Television Champion Devon in a non-title match. On the January 31 episode of Impact Wrestling, Park won his first televised match when he defeated Robbie E. On March 10 at Lockdown, Park defeated Joey Ryan in a singles match.

On the May 9 episode of Impact Wrestling, Park returned under his Abyss persona, teaming with Sting and Kurt Angle in the main event six-man tag match against Aces & Eights members Bully Ray, Devon, and Mr. Anderson. During the match, Abyss chokeslammed Anderson through a table, then delivered his signature Black Hole Slam to Devon, securing the pinfall and victory for his team. The following week, Hulk Hogan called out Abyss to thank him for his services, however, Joseph Park came out and claimed he was continuing the search for his brother. During his promo, Devon interrupted and claimed he was out for Abyss. Later that night, Park defeated Aces & Eights' D'Lo Brown to earn a shot at Devon's TNA Television Championship. On June 2 at Slammiversary XI, Park was attacked by Aces & Eights before his scheduled match with Devon, who was then awarded a count-out victory. Following this, Abyss returned and defeated Devon to win his second Television Championship. However, he never defended the title and the title was retired one year later, on July 3, 2014. On the June 13 episode of Impact Wrestling, Park defeated Crimson to qualify for the 2013 Bound for Glory Series. On the July 4 episode of Impact Wrestling, Park lost to Jeff Hardy in a BFG Series match via disqualification, after he started bleeding from the mouth, causing him to snap and attack the referee, which also cost Park ten points in the tournament. Park claimed that he had no recollection of the incident. On the August 1 episode of Impact Wrestling, Park defeated Jay Bradley via pinfall to earn seven points in the tournament. On the August 22 episode of Impact Wrestling, Park defeated Christopher Daniels, Hernandez, and Jay Bradley in a street fight to earn twenty points in the series, after again snapping at the sight of his own blood. Park's participation in the tournament ended on the August 28 episode of TNA Xplosion, when he was defeated by Bradley, leaving him outside a spot in the semi-finals. After failing to win the BFG series Park formed a tag team with Eric Young. On October 20, 2013, at Bound for Glory Abyss made his return coming to the aid of Eric Young after he was attacked by Bad Influence. On October 31, 2013, episode of Impact Wrestling, Abyss came to the aid of Eric Young again after he was attacked by Bad Influence, and proved he is no threat to Eric Young. However, on December 5, 2013, Bad Influence revealed the Park' Law Firm closed 13 years ago. Next week, Park and Young defeated Bad Influence. After the match, Young said to Park that he was Abyss. On December 26, 2013, Young booked a Monster Balls match between Bad Influence and Park and gave Janice to Park. Joseph won the match when he turned into Abyss. At the TNA One Night Only: Hardcore Justice 3 event, Park and Young defeated Bad Influence in a Full Metal Mayhem match and later on in the main event, Abyss was revealed as the fourth and mystery member of Team Angle in the Lethal Lockdown, which his team would go on to win.

==== Various alliances (2014–2015) ====
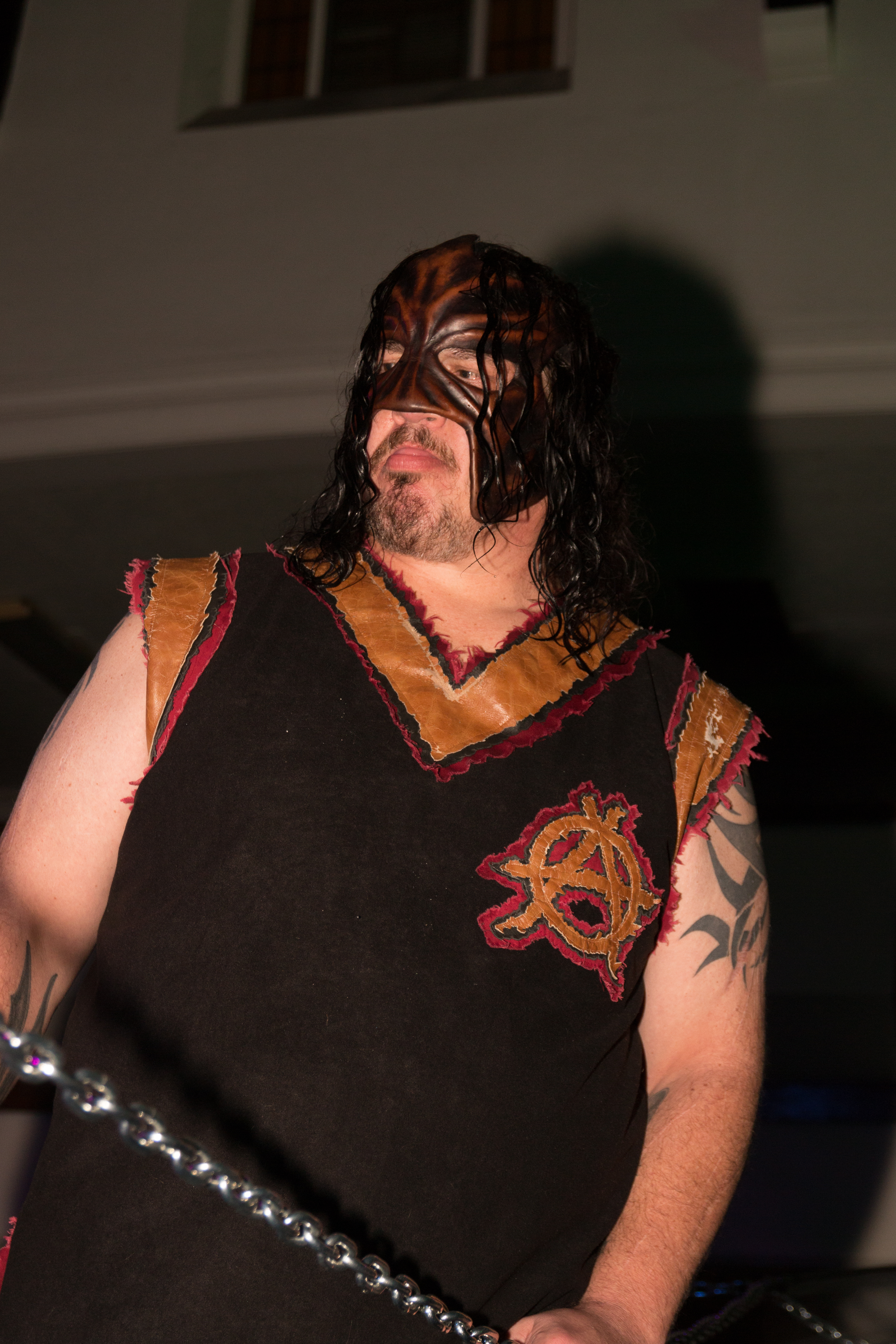
Abyss in 2015

On the February 6, 2014, episode of Impact Wrestling, Abyss defeated Eric Young in a Monster's Ball match. However, Young ripped off Abyss's mask during the match, revealing that Abyss and Joseph Park are the same person. On the February 13 episode of Impact Wrestling, Abyss confronted Young while saying that he was leaving to fix Young's mistake. On March 9 at Lockdown, Abyss turned heel again upon emerging from beneath the ring and attacking Samoa Joe during Joe's World Heavyweight Championship match against Magnus, allowing Magnus to defeat Joe and retain the title. It was revealed on the following episode of Impact Wrestling that Abyss, now wearing a new mask, was Magnus' new "insurance policy". On the April 24 episode of Impact Wrestling, Abyss broke up with Magnus and was later attacked by Magnus with a chair after he defeated him by DQ, Abyss turned face again. The pre-match stipulation for this match was that if Abyss could beat Magnus, then he would gain a TNA contract, but due to the DQ result, it has been left unclear as to whether he earned a contract or not. Abyss returned on the July 24 episode of Impact Wrestling where he saved Mr. Anderson and Samuel Shaw from a beatdown and clearing the ring. On the August 7 episode of Impact Wrestling, Bram defeated Abyss in a hardcore match. Two weeks later, at Hardcore Justice, Bram beat Abyss in a 'Stairway to Janice' match. At Bound for Glory, Abyss teamed with Tommy Dreamer, but they were defeated by Team 3D.

On the November 12, 2014, edition of Impact Wrestling, Abyss turned heel again by joining The Revolution and teaming with James Storm and they defeated The Wolves to win the TNA World Tag Team Championship. On January 30, 2015, The Revolution lost the titles against The Wolves. On September 23, 2015, Abyss announced that he left The Revolution. At Bound for Glory, he participated at the Bound for Gold, but was eliminated by the eventual winner Tyrus. During October and November, he participated in the TNA World Title Series. Abyss ended third of his block, failing into advance to the finals.

==== Decay (2016–2017) ====
On the January 26, 2016, episode of Impact Wrestling, Abyss, once again as a heel, returned to side with Crazzy Steve and Rosemary to form a new stable called Decay. They attacked the TNA World Tag Team Champions, The Wolves, and stole their titles. On March 19, 2016, Decay defeated Beer Money to win the TNA World Tag Team Championship, marking Abyss’s second individual reign. On the May 3, 2016 episode of Impact Wrestling, Rosemary spit green mist into Abyss’s face before his match against James Storm. That same night, Abyss unveiled a new look featuring zombie-style face paint after removing his mask. Decay received an invitation from the Broken Hardys to come to the Hardy Compound for a planned brawl dubbed "Delete or Decay." At Bound for Glory, Decay lost the TNA World Tag Team Championship to The Hardys. They had a rematch the following episode of Impact Wrestling in a "Wolf Creek cage match," but were again defeated. On the December 15 episode of Impact Wrestling, titled "Total Nonstop Deletion," Decay participated in The Broken Hardys’ open invitational, Tag Team Apocalypto, and were the last tag team eliminated after losing to The Broken Hardys.

After defeating The Helms Dynasty on the January 5, 2017 episode of Impact Wrestling, Decay’s celebration was abruptly interrupted by the DCC, who ambushed Abyss and Crazzy Steve by smashing beer bottles over their heads. Bram then issued a threat to Rosemary. The next day, at the One Night Only: Live PPV on January 6, Abyss and Crazzy Steve retaliated by ambushing the DCC following James Storm’s victory over Jessie Godderz, misting both Storm and Bram to incapacitate them, while Abyss delivered a chokeslam to Kingston.

On April 20, 2017, Crazzy Steve announced his departure from Impact Wrestling, leading to the disbanding of Decay. Rosemary then shifted her focus to defending the Knockouts Championship.

==== Return of Joseph Park (2017–2018) ====
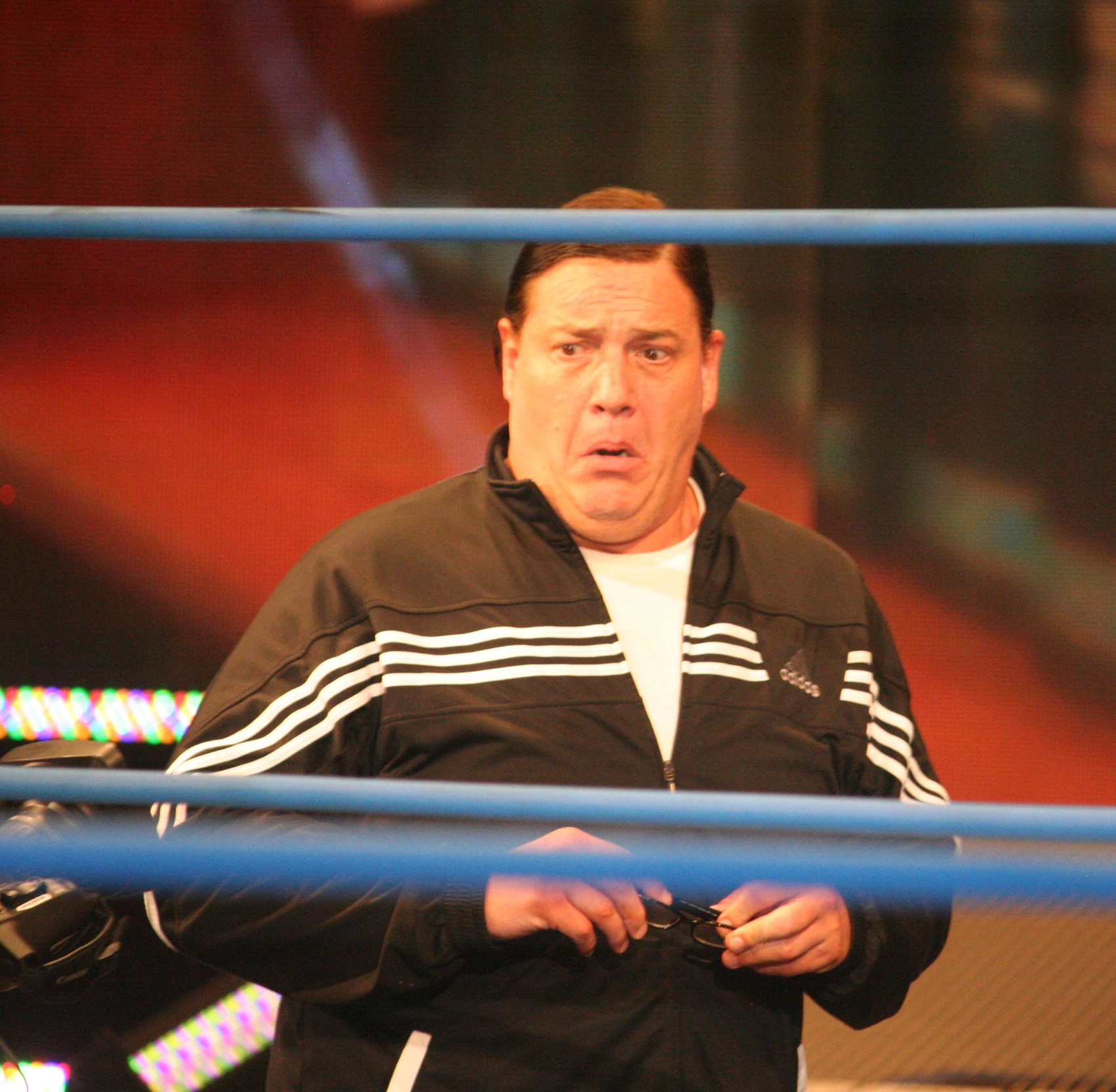
Joseph Park in 2017

On April 23, 2017, at the taping for the May 18, 2017, episode of Impact Wrestling, Joseph Park made his Impact Wrestling return, interrupting Josh Mathews to announce that he would be the tag partner of Jeremy Borash at Slammiversary XV in his match against Mathews and Scott Steiner. At Slammiversary, Park turned into Abyss midway through the match through the help of a returning Father Mitchell and went on to win the match for his team. Park subsequently returned multiple times to help Grado stay in the United States, only to turn heel for the first time as Joseph Park by revealing that he had taken advantage of Grado by skimming most of his earnings. The feud between Park and Grado culminated at Bound for Glory in a Monster's Ball Match; at the event, Park, in his Abyss persona, defeated Grado, who was forced to leave the country due to the match's stipulations.

==== Impact Hall of Famer (2018–2019) ====
In early 2018, Jimmy Jacobs brought Kongo Kong to Impact, calling him the "new monster of Impact", calling out Abyss. After refusing for weeks to "let out Abyss" as Joseph Park, leading to increasing attacks on Park's law office and family, Abyss returned, accompanied again by James Mitchell, leading to a Monster's Ball match on the March 22 episode of Impact!. Kong won the match. On October 18, Mitchell inducted Abyss into the Impact Hall of Fame. On January 23, 2019, it was reported that Abyss had been granted his release from Impact Wrestling, ending his 17-year tenure with the promotion.

=== Independent circuit (2004–2019) ===
Abyss first appeared in Ring of Honor (ROH) in 2004, brought in as a bodyguard to the stable Special K, but was limited to a single appearance as Total Nonstop Action Wrestling subsequently pulled all of their contracted talent from ROH. Abyss returned in the summer of 2005, this time as a member of Prince Nana's heel stable The Embassy as they feuded with Generation Next. The feud between the Embassy and Generation Next lasted through the rest of 2005, with several matches and brawls taking place between both teams. The feud culminated in a Steel Cage Warfare match at December's Steel Cage Warfare, where Abyss teamed with Alex Shelley, Jimmy Rave, and Prince Nana to take on Austin Aries, Roderick Strong, Jack Evans, and Matt Sydal. Abyss was eliminated in the match by Jack Evans after a moonsault, and Generation Next eventually won the match and the stables' war. In January 2006, Abyss teamed with fellow Embassy members Jimmy Rave and Alex Shelley to win ROH's Trios Tournament, with all three Embassy members earning ROH World Championship shots; however, Abyss left ROH before he could use the privilege.

On October 28, 2006, Abyss defeated Michael Sain in a Casket Match for URW in Somerset, Massachusetts

On the July 25, 2018, episode of OVW TV, Abyss defeated Amon to win the OVW Heavyweight Championship. On August 1, 2018, Abyss was stripped of the championship by Dean Hill. On October 10, Abyss defeated Justin Smooth to win the OVW Championship for the second time. On the January 30, 2019, episode of OVW TV, Abyss lost the OVW Heavyweight Championship to Tony Gunn.

=== Lucha Libre AAA Worldwide (2004–2012) ===
From April to June 2004, Abyss made four appearances for Mexican promotion AAA, which included a six-man tag team match at Triplemanía XII, where he, Abismo Negro and Chessman were defeated by Gronda, Héctor Garza and Latin Lover.

Abyss returned to the promotion on September 17, 2006, at Verano de Escándalo, where he and fellow TNA workers Jeff Jarrett and Konnan, representing La Legión Extranjera ("The Foreign Legion"), were defeated via disqualification by the team of Gronda, La Parka and Octagón.

Abyss's following appearance for AAA took place four years later on June 6, 2010, at Triplemanía XVIII, where he, now working as a face, teamed with Cibernético to defeat El Zorro and Vampiro Canadiense in a tag team match.

In May 2011, AAA started a storyline, where wrestlers from TNA, led by Jeff Jarrett, announced their intention of taking over the promotion. The first major development of the storyline took place on May 18, when Jarrett and Abyss invaded a AAA event and eventually revealed that they were working together with the heel group La Sociedad, whose leader Dorian Roldán announced his intention of replacing the letters AAA with TNA. Later that same show, Abyss teamed with Jarrett and fellow La Sociedad member Super Crazy in a six-man tag team match, where they were defeated by Dr. Wagner, Jr., Joe Líder and Nicho el Millonario. On June 18 at Triplemanía XIX, Abyss and Mr. Anderson unsuccessfully challenged Extreme Tiger and Jack Evans for the AAA World Tag Team Championship in a steel cage match. On July 20, Abyss teamed with Chessman and Último Gladiador in a six-man tag team match, where they faced Joe Líder, Extreme Tiger and Jack Evans. Abyss won the match for La Sociedad by pinning Líder after Black Hole Slamming him onto a pile of thumbtacks and afterwards also slammed Tiger onto them. This led to a Monster's Ball match on July 31 at Verano de Escándalo, where Chessman defeated Abyss, Líder and Tiger. On September 11, La Sociedad co-leader Konnan announced that on October 9 at Héroes Inmortales, Abyss and Chessman would challenge Extreme Tiger and Jack Evans for the AAA World Tag Team Championship. At the pay-per-view, Abyss and Chessman defeated Tiger and Evans in a Tables, Ladders, and Chairs match to become the new AAA World Tag Team Champions. Abyss and Chessman made their first successful title defense on May 6, 2012, defeated the Mexican Powers (Joe Líder and Juventud Guerrera).

Abyss returned to AAA on July 13, unsuccessfully challenging L.A. Park for the AAA Latin American Championship. On October 7 at Héroes Inmortales, Abyss and Chessman lost the AAA World Tag Team Championship to Joe Líder and Vampiro, ending their reign at 364 days. Following the loss, Abyss turned on Chessman, ending the partnership between the two. This would be the final appearance for Abyss for the promotion and would later retire from professional wrestling.

=== WWE (2019–present) ===
In January 2019, Park signed with WWE as a producer. On the August 14, 2020, episode of SmackDown, Park made his on screen WWE debut, appearing as the statistician for AJ Styles.

On February 23, 2026, Parks made an appearance alongside Frankie Kazarian, in his Abyss attire, during the Tribute to AJ Styles.

== Other media ==
Abyss has appeared in the video games TNA Impact!, TNA Wrestling, TNA Wrestling Impact!, WWE 2K25 as a member of the Dunk and Destruction DLC pack alongside Tyrese Haliburton, The Great Khali, Jalen Brunson, and Shaquille O'Neal, and WWE 2K26.

== Championships and accomplishments ==
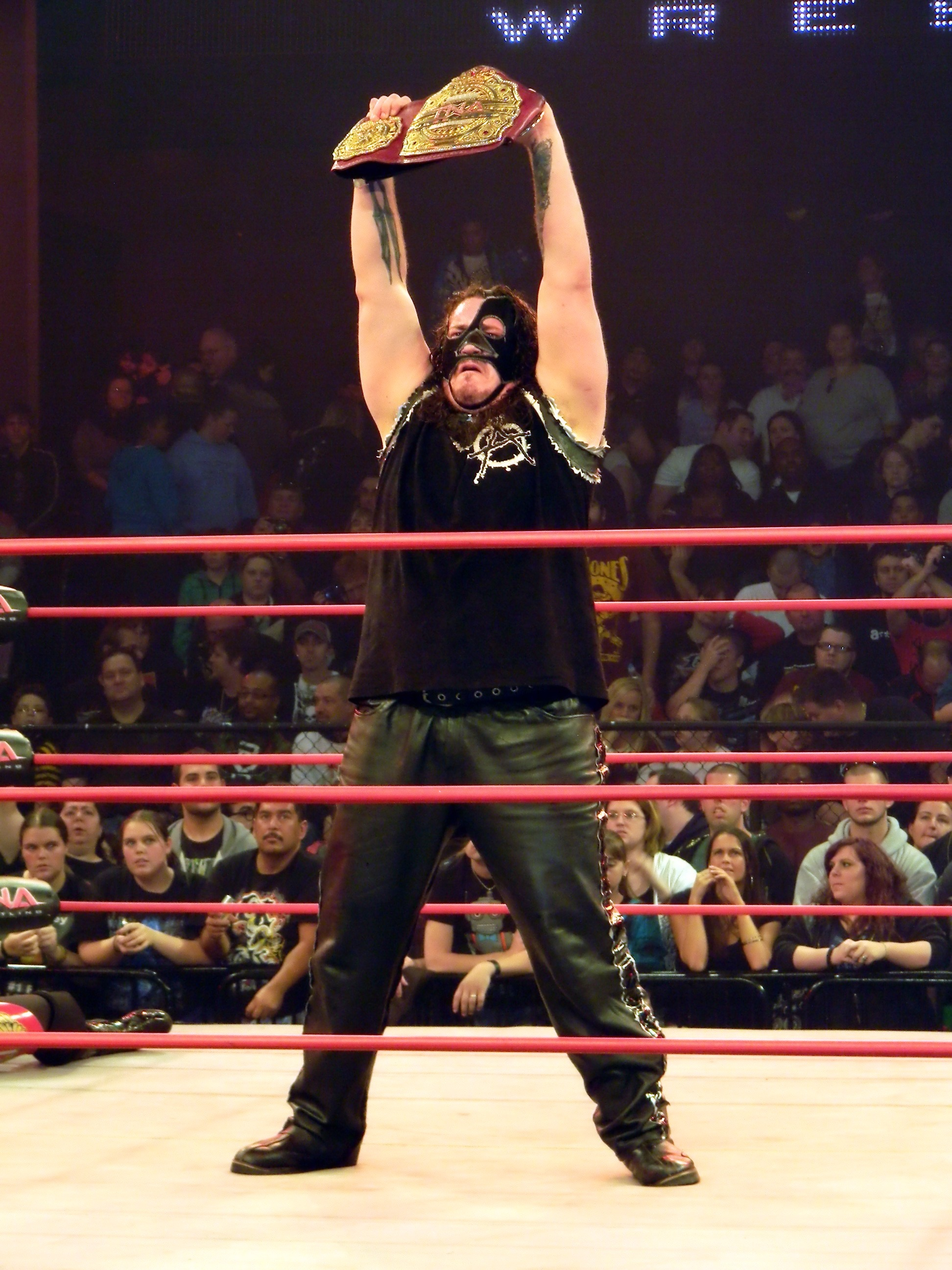
Abyss is a two-time TNA Television Champion, with his second reign being the longest in the title's history at 396 days

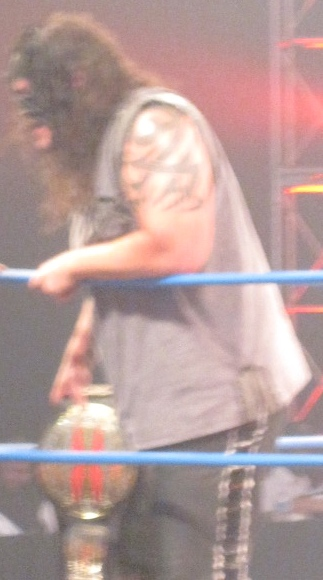
Abyss as TNA X Division Champion

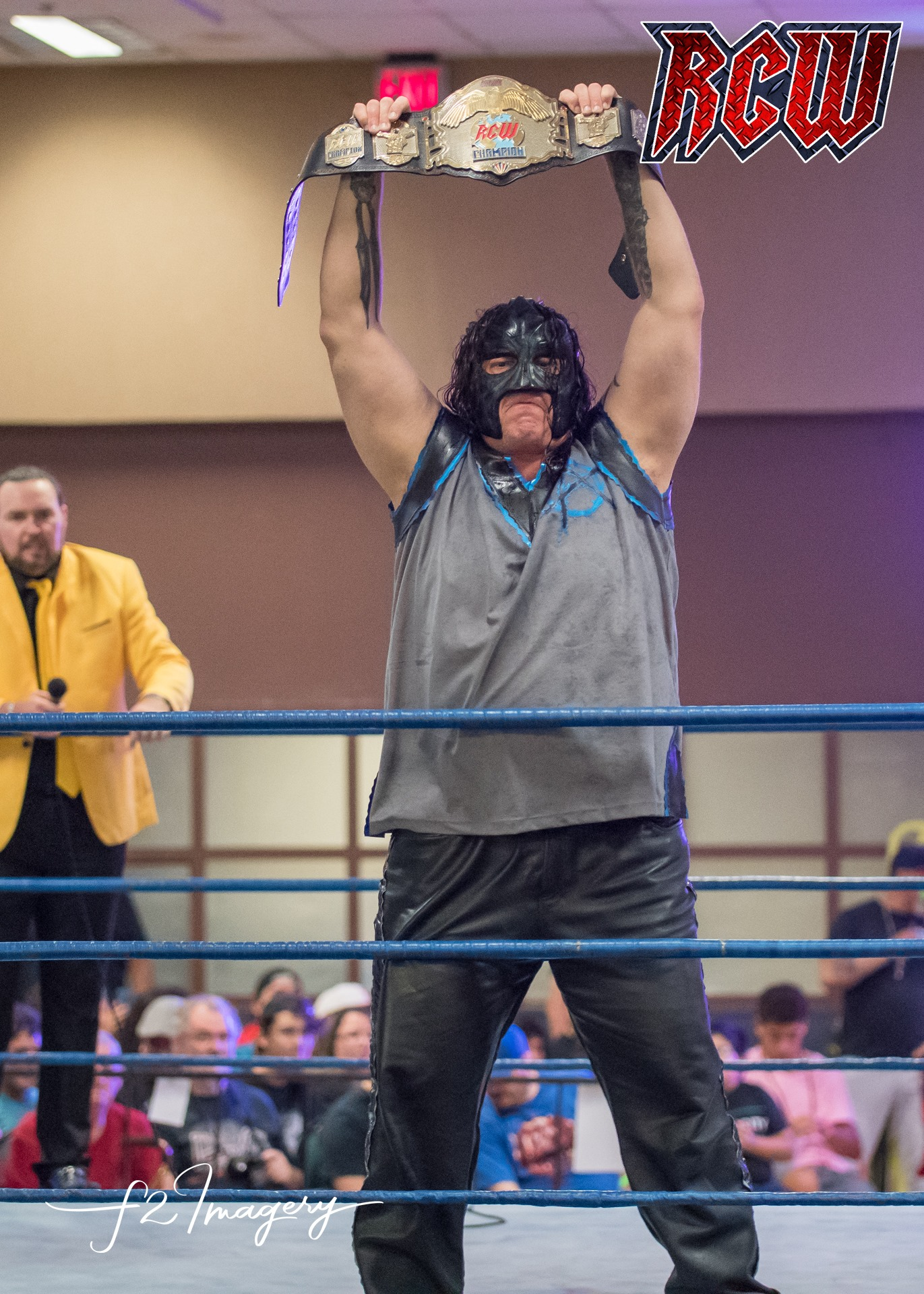
Abyss as the RCW Champion in 2018

- Asistencia Asesoría y Administración
  - AAA World Tag Team Championship (1 time) – with Chessman
- American States Wrestling Alliance
  - ASWA Tag Team Championship (1 time) – with Chris Harris
- Border City Wrestling
  - BCW Can-Am Heavyweight Championship (1 time)
- Buckeye Pro Wrestling
  - BPW Heavyweight Championship (1 time)
- Buzzsaw Championship Wrestling
  - BCW Buzzsaw Championship (1 time)
- Compound Pro Wrestling
  - ComPro Heavyweight Championship (1 time)
- Intense Championship Wrestling
  - ICW Heavyweight Championship (1 time)
- International Wrestling Association
  - IWA Intercontinental Heavyweight Championship (1 time)
  - IWA Hardcore Championship (3 times)
  - IWA World Tag Team Championship (3 times) – with Miguel Pérez, Jr. (2) and Glamour Boy Shane (1)
- Mid South Wrestling Alliance
  - MSWA Buzzsaw Championship (1 time)
- Monster Factory Pro Wrestling
  - MFPW Heavyweight Championship (1 time)
- National Wrestling Alliance
  - NWA Cyberspace Heavyweight Championship (1 time)
  - NWA Iowa Heavyweight Championship (1 time)
  - NWA Missouri Heavyweight Championship (1 time)
  - NWA Wildside Heavyweight Championship (1 time)
  - NWA Florida Junior Heavyweight Championship (1 time)
  - NWA United States Heavyweight Championship (1 time)
- Ohio Valley Wrestling
  - OVW Heavyweight Championship (2 times)
  - OVW Heavyweight Title Tournament (2018)
- One Pro Wrestling
  - 1PW Heavyweight Championship (2 times)
  - 1PW Heavyweight Championship Tournament (2006)
- Palmetto Championship Wrestling
  - PCW Heavyweight Championship (1 time)
- Pro Wrestling Illustrated
  - Ranked No. 23 of the top 500 singles wrestlers of the year in the PWI 500 in 2007 and 2010
- Ring Ka King
  - RKK Tag Team Championship (1 time) – with Scott Steiner
  - World Cup of Ring Ka King (2012) – with Scott Steiner, Deadly Danda, Sir Brutus Magnus, and Sonjay Dutt
- Ring of Honor
  - Trios Tournament (2006) – with Alex Shelley and Jimmy Rave
- River City Wrestling
  - RCW Championship (1 time)
- Superkick'D
  - Superkick'D Championship (1 time)
- Total Nonstop Action Wrestling/Impact Wrestling
  - NWA World Heavyweight Championship (1 time)
  - TNA X Division Championship (1 time)
  - TNA Television Championship (2 times)
  - TNA World Tag Team Championship (2 times) – with James Storm (1) and Crazzy Steve (1)
  - NWA World Tag Team Championship (1 time) – with A.J. Styles
  - Gauntlet for the Gold (2005 – Heavyweight)
  - Fight for the Right Tournament (2006)
  - Fourth Triple Crown Champion
  - Second Grand Slam Champion
  - TNA Hall of Fame (2018)
  - TNA Year End Awards (2 times)
    - Who to Watch in 2004 (2003)
    - Match of the Year (2005) vs. Sabu, Barbed Wire Massacre on December 11
- Universal Wrestling Alliance
  - UWA Heavyweight Championship (1 time)
- World Wrestling Alliance
  - WWA Heavyweight Championship (1 time)
- Wrestling Observer Newsletter
  - Best Gimmick (2012) Joseph Park, Esq.
  - Worst Worked Match of the Year (2006) TNA Reverse Battle Royal on TNA Impact!
