= NWA Texas Heavyweight Championship =

Professional wrestling championship

Details
- Promotion: NWA Texas; NWA Southwest; NWA Houston; World Class Championship Wrestling; World Class Wrestling Association; United States Wrestling Association; 360 Pro Wrestling
- Date established: 1930s
- Current champion: Izzy James

Other names
- WCWA Texas Heavyweight Championship; USWA Texas Heavyweight Championship
Statistics
- First champion: Martino Angelo
- Most reigns: Pepper Gomez (15 reigns)
- Longest reign: Everett Marshall (1,095+ days)
- Shortest reign: Jerry "The King" Lawler (3 days)
- Oldest champion: Johnny Valentine (42 years, 160 days minimum)
- Youngest champion: David Von Erich (20 years, 50 days)

The NWA Texas Heavyweight Championship is a professional wrestling title that has existed since the 1930s. Though its exact date of creation isn't known, it is among the oldest championships used in professional wrestling today. The title has used a variety of different names over the years, which consists of initial changes to represent the various companies that have controlled the title at different times. Originally, it was simply known as the Texas Heavyweight Championship until its name was changed after the formation of the National Wrestling Alliance in 1948. For most of the title's existence, at least until the early 1990s, it was defended almost exclusively within the Dallas, Fort Worth, Houston and San Antonio areas of Texas. From the 1930s to the mid-1960s, these cities and the surrounding towns were within the territory operated by Ed McLemore, which was known simply as Southwest Sports, Inc. at the time. After McLemore's death, the territory came under the control of Fritz Von Erich and was renamed as Big Time Wrestling. However, the promotion would be renamed World Class Championship Wrestling in the early 1980s, which is the name the territory is best remembered under today. The championship remained an NWA affiliated title until February 1986.

In 1986, WCCW withdrew from the NWA and changed their name to the World Class Wrestling Association, while still promoting under the WCCW banner. The title became the WCWA Texas Heavyweight Championship at this time. In August 1989, the title became the USWA Texas Heavyweight Championship in the United States Wrestling Association when WCCW was transformed into the USWA.

It was renamed the WCWA Texas Heavyweight Championship in July 1990 after the WCWA split from the USWA, then became the USWA Texas Heavyweight Championship again from January 1991 until February 1992, when it became inactive. It then reverted to its original name when awarded to NWA Southwest, where it was used until that promotion shut down in September 2011. It then went to NWA Houston, where it was subsequently merged with the NWA Lone Star Heavyweight Championship in a title unification match when Jax Dane defeated Raymond Rowe, NWA Lone Star Champion Ryan Genesis and NWA Texas Champion Scott Summers to unify the titles on December 14, 2012, in Cypress, Texas. The title was brought back in 2021 when Devon Nicholson bought it from a private owner. He used the title in the promotion Southwest Wrestling Entertainment, where Nicholson (wrestling as The Blood Hunter) defeated Gangrel in the finals of a battle royal-based tournament to become the first champion in 8 years. However, he vacated the title the next year and sold the belt to a private collector.

It was reactivated as the REAL Texas Heavyweight Championship on February 3, 2024 by 360 Pro Wrestling at their Bumble Rumble event in Little-River Academy, Texas. Will Allday defeated Izzy James to become the new REAL Texas Heavyweight Champion. Though other organizations claim to have THE Texas champion, the original title belt is owned by 360 Pro Wrestling, based out of Belton Texas. "Supertex" Brent McKenzie was crowned champion by defeating Will Allday on September 6, 2025 in Rogers, Texas. In a rematch in Bay City Texas on October 18, 2025, Allday defeated Brent McKenzie to regain the Real Texas Heavyweight Championship with help from John Bradshaw Layfield.

== Championship tournaments ==
=== NWA Texas Championship Tournament (1967) ===
The NWA Texas Championship Tournament was a one-night single elimination tag team tournament held in Dallas, Texas on May 2, 1967, for the vacant NWA Texas Heavyweight Championship.

Semifinals
Buddy Austin
Danny Plechas
Buddy Moreno	Draw
Luis Hernandez
Kenji Shibuya	Draw
Bearcat Wright
Jack Daniels
Cowboy Bob Ellis
Joe Blanchard
Jim Dalton
Yamamoto
Jim Bernard
Tarzan Tyler
Karl Karlson
Mike Paidousis
Paul DeMarco

Qualifiers
Buddy Austin
BYE
BYE
Bob Ellis
Joe Blanchard	Draw
Jim Bernard
Tarzan Tyler
Paul DeMarco

Finalists
Buddy Austin
Bob Ellis
BYE
Paul DeMarco

Finals
Buddy Austin
Paul DeMarco

=== NWA Texas Championship Tournament (1984) ===
The NWA Texas Championship Tournament was a one-night single elimination tournament held in San Antonio, Texas on June 23, 1984, for the vacant NWA Texas Heavyweight Championship.

Semifinals
Jose Lothario
Bill Irwin
George Weingroff
Gino Hernandez
Black Gordman
Terry Gordy
Johnny Mantell
Kerry Von Erich
John Tatum
Jules Strongbow
Buck Zumhofe
Michael Hayes
Kevin Von Erich
Killer Khan
BYE
BYE

Qualifiers
Jose Lothario
Gino Hernandez
Terry Gordy
Kerry Von Erich
Jules Strongbow
Buck Zumhofe
Kevin Von Erich
Ric Flair

Finalists
Gino Hernandez
Kerry Von Erich
Jules Strongbow
Ric Flair

Finals
Gino Hernandez†
Ric Flair

†Kerry Von Erich was originally in the bracket set to face Ric Flair in the final round. But his injury prevented him from competing, and thus was replaced by Gino Hernandez

=== WCCW Texas Championship Tournament (1987) ===
The WCCW Texas Championship Tournament was a one-night single elimination tournament held in Fort Worth, Texas on January 12, 1987, for the vacant WCCW Texas Heavyweight Championship.

Semifinals
Bob Bradley
Roberto Soto
Steve Simpson
Scott Casey
BYE
BYE
BYE
BYE
Matt Borne
The Grappler
Tony Atlas
Killer Tim Brooks
Dingo Warrior
Master Gee
BYE
BYE

Qualifiers
Bob Bradley
Steve Simpson
BYE
BYE
Matt Borne
Tony Atlas
Dingo Warrior
BYE

Finalists
Bob Bradley
BYE
Matt Borne
Dingo Warrior

Finals
Bob Bradley
Dingo Warrior

=== USWA Texas Championship Tournament (1991) ===
The USWA Texas Championship Tournament was a one-night single elimination tournament held in Dallas, Texas on January 25, 1991, to crown the first-ever USWA Texas Heavyweight Champion.

Semifinals
Mike Davis
Billy Travis
John Tatum
Bill Dundee
Jeff Jarrett
Sumo Ricky
Eric Embry
Gary Young
Steve Austin
Steven Dane
Khris Germany
The California Stud
BYE
BYE
BYE
BYE

Qualifiers
Mike Davis
Bill Dundee
Jeff Jarrett
Gary Young
Steve Austin	DDQ
The California Stud
BYE
BYE

Finalists
BYE
BYE
BYE
BYE

Finals
Bill Dundee
Gary Young

== Title history ==
Key
No.	Overall reign number
Reign	Reign number for the specific champion
Days	Number of days held
N/A	Unknown information
†	Championship change is unrecognized by the promotion
+	Current reign is changing daily

No.	Champion	Championship change			Reign statistics		Notes	Ref.
No.	Champion	Date	Event	Location	Reign	Days	Notes	Ref.
Texas Heavyweight Championship
1	Martino Angelo	1930s	House show	Texas	1	(Note: The length of the reign is too uncertain to calculate.)		
2	Leo Savage	1930s	House show	N/A	1		Records unclear as to whom he defeated to become champion	
3	Chief Little Beaver	1938	House show	Houston, Texas	1		Awarded when Savage left the match	
4	Everett Marshall	March 1938	House show	Texas	1	(Note: The date of at least one of the title changes in this reign is uncertain, which means that the reign lasted between 1,403 and 1,460 days.)		
5	Managoff	February 1942	House show	N/A	1	(Note: The date of at least one of the title changes in this reign is uncertain, which means that the reign lasted between 1 and 17 days.)	Records are unclear if he defeated Marshall or someone else to become champion	
6	Juan Humberto	February 17, 1942	House show	Dallas, Texas	1	815		
7	Lou Thesz	May 12, 1944	House show	Houston, Texas	1	49	Defeated Hans Schnabel.	
8	Ernie Dusek	June 30, 1944	House show	Houston, Texas	1	44		
9	Lou Thesz	August 13, 1944	House show	Houston, Texas	2	117		
10	Olaf Olson	December 8, 1944	House show	Texas	1	(Note: The date of at least one of the title changes in this reign is uncertain, which means that the reign lasted between 1 and 84 days.)		
—	Vacated	1945	—	—	—	—		
11	Buddy Rogers	March 2, 1945	House show	Houston, Texas	1	49	Defeated Dizzy Davis in tournament final to win the vacant title.	
12	Managoff	April 20, 1945	House show	N/A	2	21	Records unclear as to whom he defeated to become champion	
13	Jules Strongbow	May 11, 1945	House show	Houston, Texas	1	7		
14	Managoff	May 18, 1945	House show	Houston, Texas	3	56		
15	Dave Levin	July 13, 1945	House show	Houston, Texas	1	14		
16	Buddy Rogers	July 27, 1945	House show	Houston, Texas	2	35		
17	Ted Cox	August 31, 1945	House show	Houston, Texas	1	7		
18	Buddy Rogers	September 7, 1945	House show	Houston, Texas	3	12	Cox again loses the title to Juan Humberto on September 10, 1945, in Galveston, Texas, where he is still billed as champion as of the end of the month.	
19	Jim Casey	September 19, 1945	House show	San Antonio, Texas	1	65		
20	Buddy Rogers	November 23, 1945	House show	Houston, Texas	4	161		
21	Lou Thesz	May 3, 1946	House show	Houston, Texas	3	7		
22	Buddy Rogers	May 10, 1946	House show	Houston, Texas	5	45		
23	Kay Bell	June 24, 1946	House show	Texas	1	32		
24	Dave Levin	July 26, 1946	House show	Houston, Texas	2	21		
25	Ted Cox	August 16, 1946	House show	Houston, Texas	2	16		
26	Gino Garibaldi	September 1946	House show	Texas	1	(Note: The date of at least one of the title changes in this reign is uncertain, which means that the reign lasted between 1 and 107 days.)	Still champion October 8, 1946.	
Championship history is unrecorded from September 1946 to December 17, 1946.
27	Lou Thesz	December 17, 1946	House show	N/A	4	(Note: The date of at least one of the title changes in this reign is uncertain, which means that the reign lasted between 1 and −703,962. days.)		
—	Vacated	1947	—	—	—	—		
Championship history is unrecorded from December 17, 1946 to July 13, 1947.
28	Sonny Myers	July 1947	House show	Fort Worth, Texas	1	(Note: The date of at least one of the title changes in this reign is uncertain, which means that the reign lasted between 1 and 31 days.)	Sometime before July 13, 1947.	
29	Miguel Guzmán	August 1, 1947	House show	Houston, Texas	1	175	Defeated Sonny Myers.	
30	Sonny Myers	January 23, 1948	House show	Houston, Texas	2	7		
31	Yukon Eric	January 30, 1948	House show	Houston, Texas	1	7		
32	Miguel Guzmán	February 6, 1948	House show	Houston, Texas	2	91		
33	Danny McShain	May 7, 1948	House show	Houston, Texas	1	35		
34	Miguel Guzmán	June 11, 1948	House show	Houston, Texas	3	49		
35	Dizzy Davis	July 30, 1948	House show	Houston, Texas	1	7		
36	Antonino Rocca	August 6, 1948	House show	Houston, Texas	1	98		
37	Danny McShain	November 12, 1948	House show	Houston, Texas	2	18		
38	Antonino Rocca	November 30, 1948	House show	Dallas, Texas	2	32		
39	Dizzy Davis	January 1, 1949	House show	Waco, Texas	2	27		
40	Wild Red Berry	January 28, 1949	House show	Houston, Texas	1	33		
41	Miguel Guzmán	March 2, 1949	House show	San Antonio, Texas	4	30		
42	Danny McShain	April 1, 1949	House show	Houston, Texas	3	21		
43	Sonny Myers	April 22, 1949	House show	Houston, Texas	3	(Note: The date of at least one of the title changes in this reign is uncertain, which means that the reign lasted between 9 and 39 days.)		
44	Bob Wagner	May 1949	House show	Houston, Texas	1	(Note: The date of at least one of the title changes in this reign is uncertain, which means that the reign lasted between 1 and 59 days.)		
45	Rito Romero	June 15, 1949	House show	San Antonio, Texas	1	23		
46	Sonny Myers	July 8, 1949	House show	Dallas, Texas	4	18		
47	Sandy O'Donnell	July 26, 1949	House show	Dallas, Texas	1	0		
—	Vacated	July 26, 1949	—	—	—	—	Won title by disqualification so title was held up.	
48	Sonny Myers	August 5, 1949	House show	Houston, Texas	5	14	Defeated Sandy O’Donnell in rematch.	
49	Miguel Guzmán	August 19, 1949	House show	Houston, Texas	5	67		
50	Wild Red Berry	October 25, 1949	House show	Dallas, Texas	2	35		
51	Leo Newman	November 29, 1949	House show	Dallas, Texas	1	(Note: The date of at least one of the title changes in this reign is uncertain, which means that the reign lasted between 2 and 16 days.)		
—	Vacated	December 1949	—	—	—	—		
52	Verne Gagne	December 16, 1949	House show	Houston, Texas	1	28		
53	Danny McShain	January 13, 1950	House show	Houston, Texas	4	(Note: The date of at least one of the title changes in this reign is uncertain, which means that the reign lasted between 1 and 62 days.)		
—	Vacated	1950	—	—	—	—	After a match against Timmy Geohagen.	
54	Danny McShain	March 17, 1950	House show	Houston, Texas	5	28	Defeated Timmy Geohagen.	
55	Miguel Guzmán	April 14, 1950	House show	N/A	6	21		
56	Danny McShain	May 5, 1950	House show	Houston, Texas	6	32		
57	Rito Romero	June 6, 1950	House show	Dallas, Texas	2	24		
58	Sonny Myers	June 30, 1950	House show	Houston, Texas	5	38	Defeated Rito Romero.	
59	Miguel Guzmán	August 7, 1950	House show	Texas	7	32		
60	Verne Gagne	September 8, 1950	House show	Houston, Texas	2	49		
61	Rito Romero	October 27, 1950	House show	Houston, Texas	3	49		
62	Danny McShain	December 15, 1950	House show	Houston, Texas	7	21		
63	Danny Savish	January 5, 1951	House show	Houston, Texas	1	152		
64	Rito Romero	June 6, 1951	House show	Dallas, Texas	4	2		
65	Miguel Guzmán	June 8, 1951	House show	Houston, Texas	8	4		
66	Wayne Martin	June 12, 1951	House show	Dallas, Texas	1	6		
67	Miguel Guzmán	June 18, 1951	House show	Fort Worth, Texas	9	(Note: The date of at least one of the title changes in this reign is uncertain, which means that the reign lasted between 1 and −1 days.)	Awarded due to interference by Sonny Myers.	
—	Vacated	1951	—	—	—	—		
68	Duke Keomuka	August 17, 1951	House show	Houston, Texas	1	18	Defeated Ray Gunkel to win the vacant title.	
69	Ray Gunkel	September 4, 1951	House show	Dallas, Texas	1	(Note: The date of at least one of the title changes in this reign is uncertain, which means that the reign lasted between 1 and 72 days.)		
—	Vacated	1951	—	—	—	—		
70	Miguel Guzmán	October 23, 1951	House show	Dallas, Texas	10	24		
71	Mighty Atlas	November 16, 1951	House show	Houston, Texas	1	32		
72	Duke Keomuka	December 18, 1951	House show	Dallas, Texas	2	157		
73	Ray Gunkel	May 23, 1952	House show	Houston, Texas	2	126		
74	Duke Keomuka	September 26, 1952	House show	Houston, Texas	3	49		
75	Cyclone Ayala	November 14, 1952	House show	Houston, Texas	1	(Note: The date of at least one of the title changes in this reign is uncertain, which means that the reign lasted between 17 and 47 days.)		
76	Duke Keomuka	December 1952	House show	Texas	4	(Note: The date of at least one of the title changes in this reign is uncertain, which means that the reign lasted between 6 and 35 days.)		
—	Vacated	January 1953	—	—	—	—		
77	Cyclone Anaya	January 6, 1953	House show	N/A	2	(Note: The date of at least one of the title changes in this reign is uncertain, which means that the reign lasted between 1 and 41 days.)		
Championship history is unrecorded from January 6, 1953 to February 17, 1953.
78	Mr. Moto	February 16, 1953	House show	N/A	1	1		
—	Vacated	February 17, 1953	—	—	—	—		
79	Ray Gunkel	February 18, 1953	House show	Austin, Texas	3	443	Defeated Mr. Moto to win the vacant title.	
80	Bull Curry	May 7, 1954	House show	Houston, Texas	1	14		
81	Enrique Guzmán	May 21, 1954	House show	Houston, Texas	1	21		
82	Ed Francis	June 11, 1954	House show	Houston, Texas	1	41		
83	Johnny Valentine	July 22, 1954	House show	Texas	1	5		
84	Ed Francis	July 27, 1954	House show	N/A	2	87		
85	The Sheik	October 22, 1954	House show	Houston, Texas	1	28		
86	Polo Torres	November 19, 1954	House show	Houston, Texas	1	(Note: The date of at least one of the title changes in this reign is uncertain, which means that the reign lasted between 224 and 254 days.)		
87	Mr. Moto	July 1955	House show	Texas	2	(Note: The date of at least one of the title changes in this reign is uncertain, which means that the reign lasted between 5 and 24 days.)	Sometime after July 12, 1955.	
88	Pepper Gomez	August 5, 1955	House show	Houston, Texas	1	(Note: The date of at least one of the title changes in this reign is uncertain, which means that the reign lasted between 118 and 148 days.)		
89	Duke Keomuka	December 1955	House show	Texas	5	(Note: The date of at least one of the title changes in this reign is uncertain, which means that the reign lasted between 1 and 61 days.)		
90	Pepper Gomez	January 1956	House show	Texas	2	(Note: The date of at least one of the title changes in this reign is uncertain, which means that the reign lasted between 122 and 152 days.)		
91	Buddy Rogers	June 1, 1956	House show	Houston, Texas	6	34		
92	Kay Bell	July 5, 1956	House show	Houston, Texas	1	28		
93	Buddy Rogers	August 2, 1956	House show	Houston, Texas	7	1		
94	Pepper Gomez	August 3, 1956	House show	Houston, Texas	3	15		
95	Gene Kiniski	August 18, 1956	House show	Houston, Texas	1	6	Won in a tag team match, teaming with Lenny Montana to defeat Gomez and Ray Gunkel.	
—	Vacated	August 24, 1956	—	—	—	—	After a match against Pepper Gomez.	
96	Pepper Gomez	September 7, 1956	House show	Houston, Texas	4	42	Defeated Kelly in rematch.	
97	El Médico	October 19, 1956	House show	Houston, Texas	1	112		
98	Pepper Gomez	February 8, 1957	House show	Houston, Texas	5	(Note: The date of at least one of the title changes in this reign is uncertain, which means that the reign lasted between 1 and 13 days.)		
99	El Médico	February 1957	House show	Texas	2	(Note: The date of at least one of the title changes in this reign is uncertain, which means that the reign lasted between 1 and 21 days.)		
100	Pepper Gomez	February 22, 1957	House show	Houston, Texas	6	56		
101	Don Leo Jonathan	April 19, 1957	House show	Houston, Texas	1	133		
102	Ivan the Terrible	August 30, 1957	House show	Houston, Texas	1	14		
103	El Médico	September 13, 1957	House show	Houston, Texas	3	49		
104	Pepper Gomez	November 1, 1957	House show	Houston, Texas	7	7		
105	Crusher Duggan	November 8, 1957	House show	Houston, Texas	1	7		
106	Bill Melby	November 15, 1957	House show	Houston, Texas	1	67		
107	Johnny Valentine	January 21, 1958	House show	Dallas, Texas	2	66		
108	El Médico	March 28, 1958	House show	Houston, Texas	4	28		
109	Pepper Gomez	April 25, 1958	House show	Houston, Texas	8	14		
110	El Médico	May 9, 1958	House show	Houston, Texas	5	77		
111	Dick Steinborn	July 25, 1958	House show	Houston, Texas	1	70		
112	Tosh Togo	October 3, 1958	House show	Houston, Texas	1	35		
113	Pepper Gomez	November 7, 1958	House show	Houston, Texas	9	39		
114	Danny McShain	December 16, 1958	House show	Texas	5	(Note: The date of at least one of the title changes in this reign is uncertain, which means that the reign lasted between 1 and 15 days.)	Sometime after November 18, 1958.	
115	Pepper Gomez	December 1958	House show	Texas	10	(Note: The date of at least one of the title changes in this reign is uncertain, which means that the reign lasted between 27 and 2 days.)		
—	Vacated	January 13, 1959	—	Dallas, Texas	—	—	After a match against Joe Christie.	
116	Joe Christie	January 20, 1959	House show	Dallas, Texas	1	108	Defeated Gomez in rematch.	
117	Luis Hernandez	May 8, 1959	House show	Houston, Texas	1	27		
118	Corsica Joe	June 4, 1959	House show	San Antonio, Texas	1	(Note: The date of at least one of the title changes in this reign is uncertain, which means that the reign lasted between 1 and 36 days.)	Still champion as of June 25, 1959.	
Championship history is unrecorded from June 4, 1959 to July 10, 1959.
119	Nick Kozak	July 10, 1959	House show	N/A	1	(Note: The date of at least one of the title changes in this reign is uncertain, which means that the reign lasted between 1 and 83 days.)		
Championship history is unrecorded from July 10, 1959 to October 1959.
120	Nick Kozak	October 1959	House show	N/A	2	(Note: The date of at least one of the title changes in this reign is uncertain, which means that the reign lasted between 69 and 99 days.)	Records unclear as to whom he defeated.	
121	Pete Managoff	January 8, 1960	House show	Houston, Texas	1	91		
122	Torbellino Blanco	April 8, 1960	House show	Houston, Texas	1	18	Records unclear as to whom he defeated.	
123	Danny McShain	April 26, 1960	House show	Dallas, Texas	6	14		
124	Torbellino Blanco	May 10, 1960	House show	Dallas, Texas	2	43		
125	Duke Keomuka	June 22, 1960	House show	San Antonio, Texas	6	14		
126	Torbellino Blanco	July 6, 1960	House show	San Antonio, Texas	3	16		
127	Don Leo Jonathan	July 22, 1960	House show	Houston, Texas	2	42		
128	Torbellino Blanco	September 2, 1960	House show	Houston, Texas	4	8		
129	Danny McShain	September 10, 1960	House show	Texas	7	19		
130	Ciclon Negro	September 29, 1960	House show	Texas	1	113		
131	Don Manoukian	January 20, 1961	House show	Houston, Texas	1	21		
132	Pepper Gomez	February 10, 1961	House show	Houston, Texas	11	95		
—	Vacated	May 16, 1961	—	Dallas, Texas	—	—	After a match against Angelo Poffo.	
133	Pepper Gomez	May 23, 1961	House show	Dallas, Texas	12	31	Wins rematch.	
134	Waldo Von Erich	June 23, 1961	House show	Houston, Texas	1	21		
135	Dory Dixon	July 14, 1961	House show	Houston, Texas	1	105		
136	Sputnik Monroe	October 27, 1961	House show	Houston, Texas	1	21		
137	Pepe Gonzales	November 17, 1961	House show	Houston, Texas	1	14		
138	Jack Dalton	December 1, 1961	House show	Houston, Texas	1	35		
139	Dory Dixon	January 5, 1962	House show	Houston, Texas	2	133		
140	The Mummy	May 18, 1962	House show	Houston, Texas	1	28		
141	Sailor Art Thomas	June 15, 1962	House show	Houston, Texas	1	133		
142	El Médico	October 26, 1962	House show	Houston, Texas	6	77		
143	Rip Hawk	January 11, 1963	House show	Houston, Texas	1	28		
144	Sweet Daddy Siki	February 8, 1963	House show	Houston, Texas	1	77		
145	Sailor Art Thomas	April 26, 1963	House show	Houston, Texas	2	7		
146	Bill Watts	May 3, 1963	House show	Houston, Texas	1	49		
147	Pepper Gomez	June 21, 1963	House show	Houston, Texas	13	8		
148	Mark Lewin	June 29, 1963	House show	Houston, Texas	1	87		
149	Billy White Wolf	September 24, 1963	House show	Dallas, Texas	1	70		
150	Joe Blanchard	December 3, 1963	House show	Dallas, Texas	1	204		
151	Tokyo Tom	June 24, 1964	House show	Houston, Texas	1	(Note: The date of at least one of the title changes in this reign is uncertain, which means that the reign lasted between 7 and 36 days.)	Most likely Rey Urbano although Antonio Inoki has also wrestled as Tokyo Tom in his early days in the US.	
152	Pepper Gomez	July 1964	House show	Texas	14	(Note: The date of at least one of the title changes in this reign is uncertain, which means that the reign lasted between 159 and 188 days.)		
153	Fritz Von Erich	January 5, 1965	House show	Dallas, Texas	1	3		
154	Ernie Ladd	January 8, 1965	House show	Houston, Texas	1	112		
155	Fritz Von Erich	April 30, 1965	House show	Houston, Texas	2	221		
—	Vacated	December 7, 1965	—	—	—	—		
156	Fritz Von Erich	January 11, 1966	House show	Dallas, Texas	3	314	Defeated Lyons in rematch.	
157	Joe Blanchard	November 21, 1966	House show	Fort Worth, Texas	2	56		
158	Fritz Von Erich	January 16, 1967	House show	Fort Worth, Texas	4	70		
—	Vacated	March 27, 1967	—	—	—	—	Fritz won NWA American Title	
159	Buddy Austin	May 2, 1967	House show	Dallas, Texas	1	99	Defeated Paul DeMarco in 16 man tournament final.	
160	Buddy Moreno	August 9, 1967	House show	San Antonio, Texas	1	36	Or August 3, 1967 in Corpus Christi, Texas.	
—	Vacated	September 14, 1967	—	—	—	—	Moreno injured.	
161	Billy Red Lyons	November 8, 1967	House show	San Antonio, Texas	1	142	Defeated Duke Keomua by default tournament final to win the vacant title when Keomuka is unable to wrestle due to injuries inflicted by The Spoiler in earlier round.	
162	The Spoiler	March 29, 1968	House show	Houston, Texas	1	113		
163	Grizzly Smith	July 20, 1968	House show	San Antonio, Texas	1	28		
—	Vacated	August 17, 1968	—	—	—	—	After a match against Spoiler I.	
164	The Spoiler	August 20, 1968	House show	Dallas, Texas	2	112	Defeated Smith in rematch; starts wrestling as Don Jardine without the mask in October 1968.	
165	Dan Miller	December 10, 1968	House show	Houston, Texas	1	80		
166	Johnny Valentine	February 28, 1969	House show	Houston, Texas	3	99		
167	José Lothario	June 7, 1969	House show	San Antonio, Texas	1	74		
168	Johnny Valentine	August 20, 1969	House show	San Antonio, Texas	4	(Note: The date of at least one of the title changes in this reign is uncertain, which means that the reign lasted between 42 and 69 days.)		
169	Wahoo McDaniel	October 1969	House show	Texas	1	(Note: The date of at least one of the title changes in this reign is uncertain, which means that the reign lasted between 1 and 28 days.)		
170	Johnny Valentine	October 29, 1969	House show	Austin, Texas	5	89		
171	Wahoo McDaniel	January 26, 1970	House show	Fort Worth, Texas	2	(Note: The date of at least one of the title changes in this reign is uncertain, which means that the reign lasted between 1 and 15 days.)	Wins the title again defeating Valentine on February 6, 1970 in Houston, Texas.	
Championship history is unrecorded from January 26, 1970 to February 10, 1970.
172	Johnny Valentine	February 10, 1970	House show	Dallas, Texas	6	245		
173	George Scott	October 13, 1970	House show	Dallas, Texas	1	(Note: The date of at least one of the title changes in this reign is uncertain, which means that the reign lasted between 19 and 28 days.)		
174	Johnny Valentine	November 1970	House show	Texas	7	(Note: The date of at least one of the title changes in this reign is uncertain, which means that the reign lasted between 1 and 11 days.)		
175	Mr. Wrestling	November 11, 1970	House show	San Antonio, Texas	1	98		
176	Johnny Valentine	February 17, 1971	House show	San Antonio, Texas	8	1		
177	Pepper Gomez	February 18, 1971	House show	Corpus Christi, Texas	15	11		
178	Johnny Valentine	March 1, 1971	House show	Texas	9	261		
179	José Lothario	November 17, 1971	House show	San Antonio, Texas	2	113		
180	Red Bastien	March 9, 1972	House show	San Antonio, Texas	1	107		
181	Stan Stasiak	June 24, 1972	Parade of Champions	Irving, Texas	1	123		
182	José Lothario	October 25, 1972	House show	San Antonio, Texas	3	86		
183	The Missouri Mauler	January 19, 1973	House show	Houston, Texas	1	(Note: The date of at least one of the title changes in this reign is uncertain, which means that the reign lasted between 1 and 98 days.)		
184	José Lothario	1973	House show	N/A	4	(Note: The date of at least one of the title changes in this reign is uncertain, which means that the reign lasted between 1 and 98 days.)		
185	Blackjack Mulligan	April 28, 1973	House show	N/A	1	6		
186	José Lothario	May 4, 1973	House show	N/A	5	14		
187	Blackjack Mulligan	May 18, 1973	House show	Houston, Texas	2	5		
188	José Lothario	May 23, 1973	House show	San Antonio, Texas	6	217		
—	Vacated	December 26, 1973	—	San Antonio, Texas	—	—	After a match against Great Mephisto.	
189	Great Mephisto	January 15, 1974	House show	Dallas, Texas	1	133	Wins rematch.	
190	Red Bastien	May 28, 1974	House show	Dallas, Texas	2	(Note: The date of at least one of the title changes in this reign is uncertain, which means that the reign lasted between 96 and 125 days.)		
191	El Gran Markus	September 1974	House show	Texas	1	(Note: The date of at least one of the title changes in this reign is uncertain, which means that the reign lasted between 124 and 144 days.)		
192	José Lothario	February 1975	House show	N/A	7	(Note: The date of at least one of the title changes in this reign is uncertain, which means that the reign lasted between 1 and 26 days.)		
193	El Gran Markus	February 26, 1975	House show	San Antonio, Texas	2	2		
194	Al Madril	February 28, 1975	House show	Houston, Texas	1	75		
195	John Tolos	May 14, 1975	House show	San Antonio, Texas	1	62		
196	Al Madril	July 15, 1975	House show	Dallas, Texas	2	(Note: The date of at least one of the title changes in this reign is uncertain, which means that the reign lasted between 1 and 63 days.)		
—	Vacated	1975	—	—	—	—	Title held up after match against John Tolos.	
197	John Tolos	September 16, 1975	House show	Dallas, Texas	2	(Note: The date of at least one of the title changes in this reign is uncertain, which means that the reign lasted between 15 and 44 days.)	Tolos won rematch.	
198	Al Madril	October 1975	House show	Texas	3	(Note: The date of at least one of the title changes in this reign is uncertain, which means that the reign lasted between 1 and 30 days.)		
199	Peter Maivia	October 31, 1975	House show	Houston, Texas	1	3		
200	Buddy Wolfe	November 3, 1975	House show	Texas	1	(Note: The date of at least one of the title changes in this reign is uncertain, which means that the reign lasted between November 3, 1975 and 22 days.)		
201	John Tolos	November 1975	House show	Texas	3	(Note: The date of at least one of the title changes in this reign is uncertain, which means that the reign lasted between 1 and 22 days.)		
202	Peter Maivia	November 26, 1975	House show	Houston, Texas	2	86	Defeated Stan Hansen.	
203	Stan Hansen	February 20, 1976	House show	Houston, Texas	1	(Note: The date of at least one of the title changes in this reign is uncertain, which means that the reign lasted between 1 and 173 days.)		
Championship history is unrecorded from February 20, 1976 to August 11, 1976.
204	Rocky Johnson	August 11, 1976	House show	Texas	1	9		
205	Seigfreid Steinke	August 20, 1976	House show	Houston, Texas	1	(Note: The date of at least one of the title changes in this reign is uncertain, which means that the reign lasted between 1 and 133 days.)		
206	Rocky Johnson	1976	House show	Texas	2	(Note: The date of at least one of the title changes in this reign is uncertain, which means that the reign lasted between 1 and 132 days.)		
207	Seigfreid Steinke	1976	House show	Texas	2	(Note: The date of at least one of the title changes in this reign is uncertain, which means that the reign lasted between 60 and 221 days.)		
208	Moondog Mayne	March 1977	House show	Texas	1	(Note: The date of at least one of the title changes in this reign is uncertain, which means that the reign lasted between 31 and 61 days.)		
209	Scott Casey	May 1, 1977	House show	Texas	1	(Note: The date of at least one of the title changes in this reign is uncertain, which means that the reign lasted between 1 and 20 days.)		
Championship history is unrecorded from May 1, 1977 to May 20, 1977.
210	Jimmy Snuka	May 20, 1977	House show	Houston, Texas	1	(Note: The date of at least one of the title changes in this reign is uncertain, which means that the reign lasted between 1 and 167 days.)	Defeated El Gran Goliath.	
Championship history is unrecorded from May 20, 1977 to 1977.
211	Ox Baker	1977	House show	N/A	1	(Note: The date of at least one of the title changes in this reign is uncertain, which means that the reign lasted between 1 and 165 days.)	Records unclear as to whom he defeated.	
212	Al Madril	November 2, 1977	House show	San Antonio, Texas	4	142		
213	Dale Valentine	March 24, 1978	House show	Houston, Texas	1	65		
214	Bruiser Brody	May 28, 1978	House show	Houston, Texas	1	105		
215	David Von Erich	September 10, 1978	House show	Dallas, Texas	1	33		
216	Gino Hernandez	October 13, 1978	House show	Fort Worth, Texas	1	45		
217	David Von Erich	November 27, 1978	House show	Dallas, Texas	2	20		
218	Gino Hernandez	December 17, 1978	House show	Dallas, Texas	2	49		
219	David Von Erich	February 4, 1979	House show	Dallas, Texas	3	309		
220	Mark Lewin	December 10, 1979	House show	Fort Worth, Texas	2	(Note: The date of at least one of the title changes in this reign is uncertain, which means that the reign lasted between 22 and 166 days.)		
221	Gino Hernandez	1980	House show	Texas	3	(Note: The date of at least one of the title changes in this reign is uncertain, which means that the reign lasted between 1 and 145 days.)	Sometime after March 28, 1980.	
222	Mark Lewin	May 25, 1980	House show	Dallas, Texas	3	9		
223	Gino Hernandez	June 3, 1980	House show	Amarillo, Texas	4	(Note: The date of at least one of the title changes in this reign is uncertain, which means that the reign lasted between 59 and 89 days.)		
224	David Von Erich	August 1980	House show	Dallas, Texas	4	(Note: The date of at least one of the title changes in this reign is uncertain, which means that the reign lasted between 244 and 303 days.)		
225	Killer Tim Brooks	May 1981	House show	N/A	1	(Note: The date of at least one of the title changes in this reign is uncertain, which means that the reign lasted between 1 and 90 days.)	Brooks was awarded the title.	
226	Al Madril	1981	House show	Fort Worth, Texas	5	(Note: The date of at least one of the title changes in this reign is uncertain, which means that the reign lasted between 1 and 91 days.)		
227	Bill Irwin	June 5, 1982	House show	Paris, France	1	(Note: The date of at least one of the title changes in this reign is uncertain, which means that the reign lasted between 5 and 35 days.)		
—	Vacated	September 5, 1982	—	—	—	—	After a match against David Von Erich.	
228	David Von Erich	September 19, 1982	House show	Dallas, Texas	5	166		
229	Jimmy Garvin	March 4, 1983	House show	Dallas, Texas	1	31		
230	David Von Erich	April 4, 1983	House show	Fort Worth, Texas	6	(Note: The date of at least one of the title changes in this reign is uncertain, which means that the reign lasted between 1 and 26 days.)		
		April 1983	N/A	N/A			After match against Jimmy Garvin.	
231	Jimmy Garvin	June 17, 1983	House show	Dallas, Texas	2	0		
—	Vacated	June 17, 1983	—	—	—	—	Title is immediately held up after victory in first rematch because of Sunshine's interference.	
232	David Von Erich	July 4, 1983	House show	Dallas, Texas	7	7	Won rematch.	
—	Vacated	July 11, 1983	—	—	—	—	Title held up after match against Jimmy Garvin.	
233	David Von Erich	August 1, 1983	House show	Dallas, Texas	8	194	Won rematch	
—	Vacated	February 11, 1984	—	—	—	—	David dies in Japan.	
234	Gino Hernandez	June 23, 1984	House show	San Antonio, Texas	5	401	Defeated Ric Flair.	
235	Brian Adias	July 29, 1985	House show	Fort Worth, Texas	1	35		
236	Gino Hernandez	September 2, 1985	House show	Fort Worth, Texas	6	25		
237	Brian Adias	September 27, 1985	House show	Fort Worth, Texas	2	73		
238	The Grappler	December 9, 1985	House show	Fort Worth, Texas	1	91	WCCW withdraws from the NWA in February 1986.	
239	Brian Adias	March 10, 1986	House show	Fort Worth, Texas	3	116		
240	Buzz Sawyer	July 4, 1986	House show	Fort Worth, Texas	1	(Note: The date of at least one of the title changes in this reign is uncertain, which means that the reign lasted between 181 and 191 days.)		
—	Vacated	January 1987	—	—	—	—	Sawyer left promotion.	
241	Bob Bradley	January 12, 1987	House show	Fort Worth, Texas	1	21	Defeated Dingo Warrior in tournament final.	
242	Dingo Warrior	February 2, 1987	House show	Fort Worth, Texas	1	139		
243	Al Perez	June 21, 1987	House show	Puerto Rico	1	61		
—	Vacated	August 21, 1987	—	—	—	—	Perez wins WCWA Heavyweight Championship.	
244	Ted Arcidi	August 31, 1987	House show	Fort Worth, Texas	1	71	Won battle royal to win the vacant title.	
245	Matt Borne	November 10, 1987	House show	Midland, Texas	1	108		
246	Terry Taylor	February 26, 1988	House show	Dallas, Texas	1	129		
247	Kevin Von Erich	July 4, 1988	House show	N/A	1	32	Awarded when Taylor leaves promotion.	
248	Iceman Parsons	August 5, 1988	House show	Dallas, Texas	1	182		
249	Brickhouse Brown	February 3, 1989	House show	Dallas, Texas	1	29		
250	Gary Young	March 4, 1989	House show	San Antonio, Texas	1	34	Won by forfeit.	
251	Eric Embry	April 7, 1989	House show	Dallas, Texas	1	42		
252	Super Zodiac	May 19, 1989	House show	Dallas, Texas	2	4		
253	Eric Embry	May 23, 1989	House show	Dallas, Texas	2	41		
254	P.Y. Chu-Hi	July 3, 1989	House show	Wichita Falls, Texas	1	46		
255	Eric Embry	August 18, 1989	House show	Dallas, Texas	3	48	WCWA was renamed the United States Wrestling Association following this match.	
256	The Punisher	October 5, 1989	House show	Dallas, Texas	1	15	Won by forfeit.	
257	Kerry Von Erich	October 20, 1989	House show	Dallas, Texas	1	53		
258	Jerry Lawler	December 12, 1989	House show	Dallas, Texas	1	24		
259	Kerry Von Erich	January 5, 1990	House show	Dallas, Texas	2	140		
260	Matt Borne	May 25, 1990	House show	Dallas, Texas	2	7		
261	Kerry Von Erich	June 1, 1990	House show	Dallas, Texas	3	42	WCWA split from the USWA in July 1990.	
262	Angel of Death	July 13, 1990	House show	Dallas, Texas	1	133	Won by forfeit.	
263	Kevin Von Erich	November 23, 1990	House show	Dallas, Texas	2	39		
—	Vacated	January 1991	—	—	—	—	When WCWA closed.	
264	Bill Dundee	January 25, 1991	House show	Dallas, Texas	1	21	Defeated Gary Young in tournament final and Kevin Von Erich is recognized as champion by Texas Wrestling Federation after defeating Angel of Death on February 3, 1991 in Dallas, Texas until TWF closes in May 1991.	
265	Eric Embry	February 15, 1991	House show	Dallas, Texas	4	42		
—	Vacated	March 29, 1991	—	—	—	—	Title held up after match against Bill Dundee.	
266	Bill Dundee	April 5, 1991	House show	Dallas, Texas	2	7	Won rematch.	
267	Eric Embry	April 12, 1991	House show	Dallas, Texas	5	14		
268	Jerry Lawler	April 26, 1991	House show	Dallas, Texas	2	28		
—	Vacated	May 24, 1991	—	—	—	—	Title held up after match against Bill Dundee.	
269	Bill Dundee	May 31, 1991	House show	Dallas, Texas	3	7	Defeated Tom Prichard to win the held up title.	
270	Tom Prichard	June 7, 1991	House show	Dallas, Texas	1	66		
271	Lord Humongous	August 12, 1991	House show	Memphis, Tennessee	1	7		
272	Tom Prichard	August 19, 1991	House show	Memphis, Tennessee	2	175		
273	Brian Christopher	February 10, 1992	House show	Memphis, Tennessee	1	(Note: The date of at least one of the title changes in this reign is uncertain, which means that the reign lasted between 1 and 325 days.)		
—	Vacated	1992	—	—	—	—	Title inactive.	
274	Rod Price	May 1, 1998	House show	Dallas, Texas	1	58	Defeated Perry Jackson in tournament final.	
—	Vacated	June 28, 1998	—	—	—	—	Stripped for refusing to pay a fine.	
275	Brian Adias	July 3, 1998	House show	North Richland Hills, Texas	4	27	Defeated Kritical Mass in tournament final to win vacant title.	
—	Vacated	July 30, 1998	—	—	—	—	Adias injured.	
276	Perry Jackson	July 31, 1998	House show	North Richland Hills, Texas	1	119	Defeated Kit Carson.	
277	Rodney Begnaud	November 27, 1998	House show	North Richland Hills, Texas	1	68	Defeated Action Jackson and Kit Carson in a triangle match.	
—	Vacated	February 3, 1999	—	—	—	—	Begnaud leaves promotion.	
278	Khris Germany	February 5, 1999	House show	North Richland Hills, Texas	1	14	Defeated Jimmy James to win vacant title.	
279	Brian Adias	February 19, 1999	House show	North Richland Hills, Texas	5	35	Defeated Khris Germany and Jimmy James in Triple Threat match.	
280	Steven Dunn	March 26, 1999	House show	North Richland Hills, Texas	1	76		
—	Vacated	June 10, 1999	—	—	—	—	Stripped due to no-showing a title defense.	
281	Kevin Northcutt	June 10, 1999	House show	Dallas, Texas	1	49	Defeated Begnaud to win vacant title.	
283	Rodney Begnaud	July 29, 1999	House show	Dallas, Texas	2	34		
—	Vacated	September 1, 1999	—	—	—	—		
294	Kevin Northcutt	September 25, 1999	House show	North Richland Hills, Texas	2	146	Defeated James to win vacant title.	
295	Cedric of Hollywood	February 18, 2000	House show	North Richland Hills, Texas	1	50		
296	Kevin Northcutt	April 8, 2000	House show	Galveston, Texas	3	6		
		April 14, 2000	N/A	N/A			Northcutt won NWA National Heavyweight Championship.	
297	Mike Fox	April 28, 2000	House show	North Richland Hills, Texas	1	28	Defeated Begnaud in tournament final to win vacant title.	
298	Rodney Begnaud	May 26, 2000	House show	North Richland Hills, Texas	3	126		
—	Vacated	September 29, 2000	—	—	—	—		
299	Al Jackson	September 29, 2000	House show	North Richland Hills, Texas	1	63	Won 4-way match against Action Jackson, Tiger Steele, New Doctor X by pinning Action.	
300	Hotstuff Hernandez	December 1, 2000	House show	North Richland Hills, Texas	1	63		
301	Gary Tool	February 2, 2001	House show	North Richland Hills, Texas	1	42		
302	Hotstuff Hernandez	March 16, 2001	House show	North Richland Hills, Texas	2	68		
303	Kevin Northcutt	May 23, 2001	House show	San Antonio, Texas	4	86		
304	Hotstuff Hernandez	August 17, 2001	House show	Refugio, Texas	3	57		
—	Vacated	October 13, 2001	—	—	—	—	Hernandez won the NWA National Championship	
305	Kevin Northcutt	October 26, 2001	House show	North Richland Hills, Texas	5	49	Defeated Mike Anthony to win vacant title.	
306	Mike Anthony	December 14, 2001	House show	North Richland Hills, Texas	1	81		
—	Vacated	March 5, 2002	—	—	—	—		
307	J.P. Black	March 22, 2002	House show	North Richland Hills, Texas	1	91	Defeated Chaz Taylor to win vacant title.	
308	Steve DeMarco	June 21, 2002	House show	North Richland Hills, Texas	1	41		
309	J.P. Black	August 1, 2002	House show	Fort Worth, Texas	2	86		
310	Steve DeMarco	October 26, 2002	House show	Corpus Christi, Texas	2	217	DeMarco defeated Black in a Texas Death match at the NWA 54th Anniversary Show.	
311	J.P. Black	May 31, 2003	House show	Pasadena, Texas	3	112		
312	Al Jackson	September 20, 2003	House show	Greenville, Texas	2	134		
—	Vacated	February 1, 2004	—	—	—	—	Stripped for no-showing event.	
313	J.P. Black	February 1, 2004	House show	N/A	4	29	Awarded title when Jackson no-showed event.	
314	Al Jackson	March 1, 2004	House show	Texas	3	54		
315	Tejas	April 24, 2004	House show	Perry, Oklahoma	1	357		
316	Kevin Northcutt	April 16, 2005	House show	Ponca City, Oklahoma	6	455		
317	Mark Orton	July 15, 2006	House show	Beaumont, Texas	1	28		
318	Chaz Taylor	August 12, 2006	House show	Houston, Texas	1	336		
319	Seth Korbin	July 14, 2007	House show	Cypress, Texas	1	27		
320	Chaz Taylor	August 10, 2007	House show	Houston, Texas	2	65		
321	Kevin Northcutt	October 14, 2007	House show	Corpus Christi, Texas	7	315		
322	Chaz Taylor	August 24, 2008	House show	San Antonio, Texas	3	13		
323	Mike DiBiase	September 6, 2008	House show	Amarillo, Texas	1	28		
—	Vacated	October 4, 2008	—	—	—	—	DiBiase was stripped for missing scheduled title defense.	
324	Kevin Northcutt	October 4, 2008	House show	Robstown, Texas	8	97	Defeated El Diablo Rojo to win the vacant title.	
325	Michael Faith	January 9, 2009	House show	Cypress, Texas	1	64	Stripped on March 14, 2009 due to a leg injury.	
—	Vacated	March 14, 2009	—	—	—	—	Vacated due to injury	
326	Spoiler 2000	March 21, 2009	House show	Livingston, Texas	1	42	Defeated Seth Korbin for the vacant title.	
327	Kevin Northcutt	May 2, 2009	House show	Tyler, Texas	9	300		
—	Vacated	February 26, 2010	—	—	—	—	Northcutt was stripped due to injury Ken Taylor made a match between Ben Galvan and Chad Thomas to crown a new champion.	
328	Ben Galvan	February 26, 2010	House show	Robstown, Texas	1	78	Defeated Chad Thomas for the vacant title.	
329	Chad Thomas	May 15, 2010	House show	Amarillo, Texas	1	91	Defeated Ben Galvan for the title.	
330	Michael Faith	August 14, 2010	House show	Gainesville, Texas	2	21	Defeated Chad Thomas for the title.	
331	Charlie Haas	September 4, 2010	House show	Amarillo, Texas	1	121	Defeated Michael Faith for the title.	
—	Vacated	January 3, 2011	—	—	—	—	Haas was stripped for failing to make a title defense within 90 days.	
332	Lance Hoyt	January 7, 2011	House show	Robstown, Texas	1	371	Defeated Sicodelico Jr. for the vacant title.	
333	Scott Summers	January 13, 2012	House show	Cypress, Texas	1	336		
334	Jax Dane	December 14, 2012	House show	Cypress, Texas	1	0	On December 14, 2012 Jax Dane defeated Scot Summers, Ryan Genesis and Raymond Rowe in a four way match to unify the NWA Texas Heavyweight and NWA Lone Star Heavyweight titles. Summers entered the match the NWA Texas Heavyweight Champion and Genesis entered the ring the NWA Lone Star Heavyweight Champion, the unified title now going by the NWA Lone Star brand.	
—	Vacated	December 14, 2012	—	—	—	—	The Texas Heavyweight Championship was made inactive after being merged into the Lone Star Heavyweight Championship. On January 26, 2021, Chase Owens is presented one of the old Texas Heavyweight Championship belts by Tom Prichard. Owens called himself the champion during New Japan Pro-Wrestling's Castle Attack tour after claiming to have defeated Ryan "Moonshine" Mantell for the title at an unrecorded live house show.	
335	Blood Hunter	March 20, 2021	House show	Canton, Texas	1	421	Was one of the last two men in a battle royal to determine the number 1 and 2 contenders for the revived Texas Heavyweight Championship at Southwest Wrestling Entertainment's "Clash in Canton" event, then defeated Gangrel to become the Texas Heavyweight Champion.	
—	Vacated	May 15, 2022	—	—	—	—	Blood Hunter vacated the title after he retired.	
336	Izzy James	May 25, 2025	N/A	San Antonio, Texas			Defeated Marovik at DPCW's Mutual Combat event to win the vacant tile in an NWA Texas Championship tournament finals match This reign continues the lineage of the original Texas Heavyweight Championship.	

== Combined reigns ==
Key

Symbol	Meaning
¤	The exact length of at least one title reign is uncertain, so the shortest possible length is used.
†	Indicates the current champion

Rank	Wrestler	No. of Reigns	Combined days
1	Kevin Northcutt	9	1503
2	Everett Marshall	1	1433
3	David Von Erich	8	973¤
4	Johnny Valentine	9	818
5	Juan Humberto	1	815
6	Pepper Gomez	15	778
7	Fritz Von Erich	4	608
8	Ray Gunkel	3	570¤
9	Gino Hernandez	6	549¤
10	José Lothario	7	530
11	Miguel Guzmán	10	494
12	Blood Hunter	1	421
13	Chaz Taylor	3	414
14	Lance Hoyt	1	371
15	Lou Thesz	4	369
16	Tejas	1	357
17	El Médico	6	344¤
18	Buddy Rogers	7	337
19	Scott Summers	1	336
20	J.P. Black	4	318
21	Al Madril	5	311
22	Duke Keomuka	6	300
23	Brian Adias	5	286
24	Joe Blanchard	2	260
25	Steve DeMarco	2	258
26	Al Jackson	3	251
27	Tom Prichard	2	241
28	Dory Dixon	2	238
29	Kerry Von Erich	3	235
30	Rodney Begnaud	3	228
31	The Spoiler	2	225
32	Polo Torres	1	224
33	Red Bastien	2	203
34	Danny McShain	10	190
35	Hotstuff Hernandez	3	188
36	Eric Embry	5	187
37	Iceman Parsons	1	182
38	Buzz Sawyer	1	181
39	Don Leo Jonathan	2	175
40	El Gran Markus	2	155
41	Danny Savish	1	152
42	Billy Red Lyons	1	142
43	Sailor Art Thomas	2	140
44	Dingo Warrior	1	139
45	Angel of Death	1	133
45	Great Mephisto	1	133
47	Antonino Rocca	2	130
48	Terry Taylor	1	129
49	Ed Francis	2	128
50	Stan Stasiak	1	123
51	Charlie Haas	1	121
52	Perry Jackson	1	119
53	Mark Lewin	3	118¤
54	Matt Borne	2	115
55	Ciclon Negro	1	113
56	Ernie Ladd	1	112
56	Rito Romero	4	112
58	Joe Christie	1	108
59	Bruiser Brody	1	105
60	Nick Kozak	2	100¤
61	Buddy Austin	1	99
62	Mr. Wrestling	1	98
63	Managoff	3	93
64	Pete Managoff	1	91
64	Chad Thomas	1	91
64	The Grappler	1	91
67	Peter Maivia	2	89
68	Sonny Myers	6	87¤
69	Michael Faith	2	85
69	Torbellino Blanco	4	85
71	Mike Anthony	1	81
72	Dan Miller	1	80
73	Ben Galvan	1	78
73	John Tolos	3	78
75	Sweet Daddy Siki	1	77
76	Steven Dunn	1	76
76	Verne Gagne	2	76
78	Kevin Von Erich	2	71
78	Ted Arcidi	1	71
80	Dick Steinborn	1	70
80	Billy White Wolf	1	70
82	Wild Red Berry	2	68
83	Bill Melby	1	67
84	Jim Casey	1	65
84	Dale Valentine	1	65
86	Al Perez	1	61
86	Moondog Mayne	1	61
88	Kay Bell	2	60
89	Rod Price	1	58
90	Jerry Lawler	2	52
91	Cedric of Hollywood	1	50
92	Bill Watts	1	49
93	P.Y. Chu-Hi	1	46
94	Ernie Dusek	1	44
95	Gary Tool	1	42
95	Spoiler 2000	1	42
97	Gary Young / Super Zodiac	2	38
97	Wahoo McDaniel	2	38¤
99	Mr. Moto	2	36
99	Buddy Moreno	1	36
101	Jack Dalton	1	35
101	Bill Dundee	3	35
101	Bill Irwin	1	35
101	Dave Levin	2	35
101	Tosh Togo	1	35
106	Dizzy Davis	2	34
106	Jimmy Garvin	2	34
108	Mighty Atlas	1	32
109	Bob Wagner	1	31
110	Brickhouse Brown	1	29
111	Mike Fox	1	28
111	The Mummy	1	28
111	Mark Orton	1	28
111	The Sheik	1	28
111	Grizzly Smith	1	28
111	Mike Dibiase	1	28
111	Rip Hawk	1	28
118	Luis Hernandez	1	27
118	Seth Korbin	1	27
120	Ted Cox	2	23
121	Enrique Guzmán	1	21
121	Bob Bradley	1	21
121	Don Manoukian	1	21
121	Sputnik Monroe	1	21
121	Waldo Von Erich	1	21
126	George Scott	1	19
127	Cyclone Anaya	2	18¤
128	The Punisher	1	15
129	Khris Germany	1	14
129	Pepe Gonzales	1	14
129	Ivan the Terrible	1	14
129	Bull Curry	1	14
133	Blackjack Mulligan	2	11
134	Rocky Johnson	2	10¤
135	Crusher Duggan	1	7
135	Lord Humongous	1	7
135	Tokyo Tom	1	7
135	Yukon Eric	1	7
135	Jules Strongbow	1	7
140	Wayne Martin	1	6
140	Gene Kiniski	1	6
142	Leo Newman	1	2
142	Seigfreid Steinke	2	2¤
144	Corsica Joe	1	1¤
144	Gino Garibaldi	1	1¤
144	Olaf Olson	1	1¤
144	Brian Christopher	1	1¤
144	Buddy Wolfe	1	1¤
144	Jimmy Snuka	1	1¤
144	Killer Tim Brooks	1	1¤
144	Ox Baker	1	1¤
144	Scott Casey	1	1¤
144	Stan Hansen	1	1¤
144	The Missouri Mauler	1	1¤
155	Martino Angelo	1	0¤
155	Sandy O'donnell	1	0¤
155	Leo Savage	1	0¤
155	Chief Little Beaver	1	0¤

== See also ==
- List of National Wrestling Alliance championships
- World Class Championship Wrestling
- United States Wrestling Association
- Global Wrestling Federation
- Continental Wrestling Association
