= Steve DeMarco =

American professional wrestler (born 1974)

Personal information
- Born: Steven Martinez; November 25, 1974 (age 51) Houston, Texas, U.S.

Professional wrestling career
- Ring name: Steve DeMarco
- Billed height: 6 ft 1 in (1.85 m)
- Billed weight: 220 lb (100 kg; 16 st)
- Billed from: Corpus Christi, Texas
- Trained by: Chavo Guerrero Sr. George de la Isla; Pro Wrestling Alliance; Booker T
- Debut: 2001

Steven "Steve" Martinez (born November 25, 1974) is an American professional wrestler, better known by his ring name Steve DeMarco. He is currently working for the Pro Wrestling Alliance, and is also well known for his appearances in the Arlington, Texas-based Professional Championship Wrestling, where he is recognized as their first Grand Slam Champion.

== Professional wrestling career ==
=== National Wrestling Alliance (2002) ===
After training with Chavo Guerrero, Sr. and George de la Isla, Martinez made his professional wrestling debut in 2001 under the ring name Steve DeMarco. In 2002, he joined the National Wrestling Alliance territory NWA Southwest and eventually won the Texas Heavyweight Championship after defeating JP Black on June 21, beginning a feud with him in the process. He re-lost the title to Black on August 1 before defeating Black once again for the title on October 26 at the NWA's 54 anniversary show "Battle of the Belts". Black won the title once again on May 31, ending their feud.

=== Professional Championship Wrestling (2003–2012) ===
On May 10, 2003, DeMarco made his debut in Professional Championship Wrestling. He soon moved to the cruiserweight division, where he defeated Duffy of the KEG Brothers for the Cruiserweight Championship. After losing the Cruiserweight Title, DeMarco formed a tag team with Action Jackson, and both would go on to win the Tag Team Championship after defeating The Professionals (Mike Thunder and John Allen). DeMarco continued to accumulate more titles, as he defeated Canyon for the Television Championship, The Uncut Title and ultimately the Heavyweight Championship after winning a one-night tournament, where he defeated BJ Turner, Lance Hoyt, and Shawn Hernandez to claim the title. However, DeMarco soon lost the Tag Team, Television and Heavyweight Titles, the latter of which to Hoyt, before he reclaimed it from Hoyt in a rematch.

=== Pro Wrestling Alliance (2006–2012) ===
In 2006, DeMarco joined Booker T's new promotion, the Pro Wrestling Alliance, where he received training from the promotion's school and Booker himself. At the promotion's debut show, Christmas Chaos, DeMarco lost to Umaga. On June 29, 2007, DeMarco and Franco Valentino lost to Kryll (AD Star and Creet) in the first round of a tournament to crown the first ever Tag Team Champions. On June 27, 2008, DeMarco and The Pride lost to Valentino and Neico in the first round of another Tag Team Title tournament. A little under a month later, DeMarco picked up his first victory in the promotion after defeating Tank Bishop. On October 31, DeMarco unsuccessfully competed in a six-man elimination match to crown the first ever Iron Man Champion.

=== World of Wrestling (2008) ===
DeMarco made two appearances for World of Wrestling in 2008. On October 10, he wrestled against Mysterious Q for the Cruiserweight Championship in a two out of three falls match, which ended in a draw. His second and last appearance occurred on November 14, where he wrestled against Michael Faith in a losing effort for the Heavyweight Championship.

=== Total Championship Wrestling (2009–2013) ===
In early 2009, DeMarco began working for the Austin-based Total Championship Wrestling. After appearing on the company's first ever show, he cut a program welcoming the fans in attendance to "The Lucha Lounge", a nod to his YouTube online show of the same. Later on in the night, he became the promotion's first Heavyweight Champion after defeating Dark Star.

== Championships and accomplishments ==
- Capitol of Texas Pro Wrestling
  - CTPW Heavyweight Championship (1 time)
  - CTPW Television Championship (1 time)
  - CTPW Tag Team Championship (1 time); with Dade Venge
- Coastal Wrestling Federation
  - CWF Heavyweight Championship (1 time)
- Gulf Coast Power Pro Wrestling
  - GCPPW Heavyweight Championship (1 time)
- Southwest Premier Wrestling
  - SPW Heavyweight Championship (1 time)
  - SPW Heavyweight Title Tournament Battle Royal (2005)
- National Wrestling Alliance
  - NWA Texas Heavyweight Championship (2 times)
- Professional Championship Wrestling
  - PCW Cruiserweight Championship (1 time)
  - PCW World Heavyweight Championship (2 times)
  - PCW Uncut Championship (3 times)
  - PCW Tag Team Championship (1 time) – with Action Jackson
  - PCW Television Championship (1 time)
  - PCW World Heavyweight Title Tournament (2004)
  - First PCW Grand Slam Champion
- Pro Wrestling Illustrated
  - PWI ranked him #296 of the 500 best singles wrestlers of the year in the PWI 500 in 2005
- Texas All-Star Wrestling
  - TASW Heavyweight Championship (3 time)
  - 26th Annual Humble Rumble Battle Royal (2019)
- Total Championship Wrestling
  - TCW/NWA Southwest Heavyweight Championship (3 times)
- XWO Wrestling
  - XWO Heavyweight Championship (1 time)
- Other Titles
  - TXW Tag Team Championship (1 times) – with Revello Negro
