= WCWA Texas Tag Team Championship =

Professional wrestling tag team championship

- An early version of the championship belt

Details
- Promotion: Dallas Wrestling Club; Southwest Sports; Big Time Wrestling; World Class Wrestling Association
- Date established: 1943
- Date retired: 1981 (original); 1989 (WCWA)

Other name
- NWA Texas Tag Team Championship
Statistics
- First champions: Ellis Bashara and Angelo Cistoldi (overall); Bobby Managoff and Otto Kuss (East Texas); Rito Romero and Miguel Guzmán (Southwest Sports); Tony Atlas and Skip Young (WCWA)
- Final champions: Raul Mata and Billy White Cloud (original); Steve and Shaun Simpson (WCWA)
- Most reigns: Team: Duke Keomuka and Danny Savich (6 reigns); individual: Duke Keomuka (16 reigns)
- Longest reign: Rito Romero and Miguel Guzmán (272) (Note: Longest confirmed reign, with gaps in the documented championship history it is possible that another team had a longer reign.)
- Shortest reign: Killer Kowalski (1 day) (Note: Kowalski won the championship but did not return to Texas to defend it.)

The WCWA Texas Tag Team Championship was the secondary professional wrestling tag team championship promoted by the Dallas–Fort Worth metroplex area-based World Class Wrestling Association (WCWA). The championship was originally known as the NWA Texas Tag Team Championship from its creation in 1942 until 1981. The championship was revived in 1987 as the WCWA Texas Tag Team Championship, and used until 1990, when it was abandoned as WCWA was merged with the Continental Wrestling Association (CWA) to become the United States Wrestling Association. The name was also used for a title by NWA Southwest from 1998 to 2011, also known as the NWA Southwest Texas Tag Team Championship. As it is a professional wrestling championship, it is won not by actual competition, but by a scripted ending to a match. (Note: Hornbaker (2016) p. 550: "Professional wrestling is a sport in which match finishes are predetermined. Thus, win–loss records are not indicative of a wrestler's genuine success based on their legitimate abilities – but on now much, or how little they were pushed by promoters")

The first time a championship was promoted as the "Texas Tag Team Championship" was in 1943 when records indicate that Ellis Bashara and Angelo Cistoldi won the championship. The Texas Tag Team Championship was not mentioned again until 1945 in what would later become the National Wrestling Alliance's East Texas territory. By 1950 it was promoted by Southwest Sports and was officially recognized by the NWA. The first champions recognized by the NWA was the team of Rito Romero and Miguel Guzmán. In 1966, Fritz Von Erich bought Southwest Sports and renamed it NWA Big Time Wrestling. In the 1981 the championship was abandoned, with Raul Mata and Billy White Wolf as the last champions at the time. The Texas Tag Team Championship was brought back in 1987, with Big Time Wrestling now known as World Class Wrestling Association. The first WCWA Texas Tag Team Champions were Tony Atlas and Skip Young, who won a one-night single elimination tag team tournament to claim the championship. When WCWA merged with the Tennessee-based CWA the title was abandoned, with Steve and Shaun Simpson as the last holders of the championship. In 2012 NWA Wrecking Ball Wrestling reactivated the NWA Texas titles.

The team of Duke Keomuka and Danny Savich won the championship on six occasions, the most of any team. Keomuka won the championship a total of 16 times, in addition to teaming with Savich he also won it with Ivan Kalmikoff, Mr. Moto, Don Evans, Tiny Mills, Kinji Shibuya, Tony Martin, Tokyo Joe, John Tolos, and Maurice Vachon. In 1950, Killer Kowalski defeated Keomuka and Savich in a handicap match, to become the only wrestler to hold the tag team championship singled handedly. Romero and Guzmán's reign from March 3 until November 30, 1950, is the longest confirmed reign of any championship team, a total of 272 days. Based on recorded history there were 153 individual reigns between 1943 and 1989, possibly more since there are periods of time where the championship history is unrecorded.

== Title history ==
Key
No.	Overall reign number
Reign	Reign number for the specific team—reign numbers for the individuals are in parentheses, if different
Days	Number of days held
N/A	Unknown information
(NLT)	Championship change took place "no later than" the date listed

No.	Champion	Championship change			Reign statistics		Notes	Ref.
No.	Champion	Date	Event	Location	Reign	Days	Notes	Ref.
Texas Tag Team Championship (Dallas Wrestling Club)
1	Ellis Bashara and Angelo Cistoldi	June 1, 1943	House show	N/A	1	N/A	The first recorded "Texas Tag Team Championship" may not share a lineage with the championship promoted from 1950 and forward. In some places referred to as the "Southwest Tag Team Championship"	
Championship history is unrecorded from June 1, 1943 to May 1945.
NWA Texas Tag Team Championship (East Texas NWA territory)
2	Bobby Managoff and Otto Kuss	(NLT) May 1945	House show	N/A	1	N/A	The second recorded "Texas Tag Team Championship" may not share a lineage with the championship promoted from 1950 and forward	
3	Hans Schnable and Marvin Jones	May 14, 1945	House show	Galveston, Texas	1	7		
4	Rogers and Otto Kuss (2)	May 21, 1945	House show	Galveston, Texas	1	N/A		
Championship history is unrecorded from 1945 to 1950.
NWA Texas Tag Team Championship (Southwest Sports)
5	Rito Romero and Miguel Guzmán	March 3, 1950	House show	Dallas, Texas	1	272	Defeated Red Berry and Danny McShain and later Defeated Al Lovelock and Danny McShain for the title on March 14, 1950.	
6	Duke Keomuka and Danny Savich	November 30, 1950	House show	Galveston, Texas	1	11		
7	Killer Kowalski	December 11, 1950	House show	Ft. Worth, Texas	1	1	Won a handicap match against the champions.	
—	Vacated	January 1951	—	—	—	—	Not defended within 30 days of winning it	
8	Duke Keomuka and Danny Savich	January 1951	House show	Ft. Worth, Texas	2	N/A	Defeated Al Lovelock and Rito Romero to win the vacant championship	
9	Al Lovelock and Rito Romero (2)	January 1951	House show	N/A	1	N/A		
10	Duke Keomuka and Danny Savich	January 30, 1951	House show	Dallas, Texas	3	94		
11	Timothy Geohagen and Big Humphrey	May 4, 1951	House show	Houston, Texas	1	N/A		
12	Duke Keomuka and Danny Savich	June 1951	House show	N/A	4	N/A		
—	Vacated	June 1951	—	—	—	—	championship vacated for undocumented reasons	
13	Al Lovelock (2) and Sonny Myers	June 19, 1951	House show	Dallas, Texas	1	N/A	Defeated Miguel Guzmán and Rito Romero.	
Championship history is unrecorded from June 19, 1951 to October 1951.
14	Ellis Bashara (2) and Danny Savich (5)	October 1951	House show	N/A	1	8		
15	Babe and Chris Zaharias	October 9, 1951	House show	Dallas, Texas	1	7		
16	Miguel Guzman and Rito Romero	October 16, 1951	House show	Dallas, Texas	2	101		
17	Duke Keomuka (5) and Ivan Kalmikoff	January 25, 1952	House show	Houston, Texas	1	7	Defeated Rito Romero and Miguel Guzmán	
18	Miguel Guzman (3) and Ray Gunkel	February 1, 1952	House show	Houston, Texas	1	25	Win by DQ.	
19	Duke Keomuka (6) and Mr. Moto	February 26, 1952	House show	Dallas, Texas	1	171		
20	Rito Romero (4) and Miguel Guzman (4)	August 15, 1952	House show	Houston, Texas	3	53		
21	Duke Keomuka (7) and Danny Savich (6)	October 7, 1952	House show	Dallas, Texas	5	55		
—	Vacated	November 1952	—	—	—	—	championship vacated for undocumented reasons	
22	Gory Guerrero and Cyclone Anaya	December 1, 1952	House show	Ft. Worth, Texas	1	N/A	Won a one night tournament to win the vacant championship.	
—	Vacated	December 1952	—	—	—	—	championship vacated for undocumented reasons	
Championship history is unrecorded from December 1952 to January 6, 1953.
23	Ray Gunkel (2) and Ricki Starr	January 6, 1953	House show	N/A	1	N/A	Still champions as of April 14, 1953.	
Championship history is unrecorded from April 14, 1953 to November 3, 1953.
24	Rito Romero (5) and Miguel Guzmán (5)	November 3, 1953	House show	N/A	4	N/A		
—	Vacated	December 1953	—	—	—	—	championship vacated for undocumented reasons	
Championship history is unrecorded from December 1953 to December 1953.
25	Ray Gunkel (3) and Ricki Starr	December 1953	House show	Austin, Texas	2	N/A	Defeated Duke Keomuka and Kinji Shibuya.	
Championship history is unrecorded from December 1953 to March 1954.
26	Orville Carlson and Rito Romero (6)	March 1954	House show	N/A	1	N/A		
27	Ivan Kalmikoff (2) and Karol Krauser	March 30, 1954	House show	Dallas, Texas	1	2		
28	Ray Gunkel (4) and Ricki Starr (3)	April 1954	House show	N/A	3	23	Sometime after April 7, 1954.	
29	Rito Romero (7) and Miguel Guzmán (6)	April 24, 1954	House show	Houston, Texas	5	N/A		
Championship history is unrecorded from April 24, 1954 to May 4, 1954.
30	Ivan Kalmikoff (3) and Karol Krauser	(NLT) May 4, 1954	House show	N/A	2	N/A		
31	Rito Romero (8) and Sugi Sito	(NLT) May 1954	House show	San Antonio, Texas	1	N/A	Sometime between May 12, 1954 and May 18, 1954.	
Championship history is unrecorded from May 1954 to August 3, 1954.
32	Duke Keomuka (8) and Don Evans	August 3, 1954	House show	N/A	1	N/A		
Championship history is unrecorded from August 3, 1954 to October 1954.
33	Rito Romero (9) and George Drake	(NLT) October 1954	House show	N/A	1	N/A		
34	Roy Shire and The Great Scott	October 12, 1954	House show	Dallas, Texas	1	31		
35	Rito Romero (10) and Pepe Mendietta	November 12, 1954	House show	Houston, Texas	1	N/A		
Championship history is unrecorded from November 12, 1954 to April 1955.
36	Maurice Vachon and Pierre LaSalle	(NLT) April 1955	House show	N/A	1	N/A		
37	Larry Chene and Raul Zapata	May 10, 1955	House show	Austin, Texas	1	24		
38	Hard Boiled Haggerty and Stu Gibson	June 3, 1955	House show	Houston, Texas	1	55		
39	Rito Romero (11) and Pepper Gomez	July 28, 1955	House show	Galveston, Texas	1	68		
40	Duke Keomuka (9) and Danny Savich (7)	October 4, 1955	House show	Dallas, Texas	6	17		
41	Ray Gunkel (5) and Wilbur Snyder	October 21, 1955	House show	Houston, Texas	1	52		
42	Duke Keomuka (10) and Tiny Mills	December 12, 1955	House show	Ft. Worth, Texas	1	57		
43	Pepper Gomez (2) and Luigi Macera	February 7, 1956	House show	Dallas, Texas	1	14		
44	Duke Keomuka (11) and Kinji Shibuya	February 21, 1956	House show	Dallas, Texas	1	31		
45	Ray Gunkel (6) and Prince Maiava	March 23, 1956	House show	Houston, Texas	1	N/A		
Championship history is unrecorded from March 23, 1956 to May 15, 1956.
—	Vacated	May 15, 1956	—	—	—	—	championship vacated for undocumented reasons	
46	Mike DiBiase and Danny Plechas	May 29, 1956	House show	N/A	1	14	Defeated Pepper Gomez and Luther Lindsey in a controversial finish on May 22, 1956 to claim the title. Later defeated Gomez and Lindsey for an official recognition.	
—	Vacated	June 4, 1956	—	—	—	—	championship vacated for undocumented reasons	
47	Mike DiBiase and Danny Plechas	June 12, 1956	House show	Dallas, Texas	2	15	Defeated Don Evans and Duke Keomuka.	
—	Vacated	June 27, 1956-July 5, 1956	—	—	—	—	championship vacated for undocumented reasons	
48	Mike DiBiase and Danny Plechas	June 6, 1956	House show	Houston, Texas	3	51	Win 4-team tournament.	
49	Duke Keomuka (12) and Tony Martin	July 27, 1956	House show	Houston, Texas	1	46		
50	Ray Gunkel (7) and Herb Freeman	September 11, 1956	House show	Dallas, Texas	1	7		
51	Gene Kelly and Len Crosby	September 18, 1956	House show	Dallas, Texas	1	34		
52	Ray Gunkel (8) and The Amazing Zuma	October 22, 1956	House show	Ft. Worth, Texas	1	N/A		
Championship history is unrecorded from October 22, 1956 to March 13, 1957.
53	El Medico and Amazing Zuma (2)	(NLT) March 13, 1957	House show	N/A	1	N/A		
Championship history is unrecorded from March 13, 1957 to April 23, 1957.
54	Duke Keomuka (13) and Tokyo Joe	(NLT) April 23, 1957	House show	N/A	1	N/A		
55	Pepper Gomez (3) and El Medico (2)	June 21, 1957	House show	Houston, Texas	1	91		
56	Ivan the Terrible and Nikita Zolotoff	September 20, 1957	House show	Houston, Texas	1	24		
57	Duke Keomuka (14) and Mr. Moto (2)	October 14, 1957	House show	Ft. Worth, Texas	2	42		
58	Pepper Gomez (4) and Bill Melby (2)	November 25, 1957	House show	Ft. Worth, Texas	1	43		
—	Vacated	December 1957	—	—	—	—	Pepper Gomez left the promotion	
59	Danny McShain and Casey McShain	January 7, 1958	House show	Dallas, Texas	1	51	Defeated Jesus Cardenas and Enrique Romero in tournament final after the first match on January 7, 1958 was voided by the commissioner due to a controversial ending.	
60	Enrique Torres and Alberto Torres	February 27, 1958	House show	Galveston, Texas	1	54		
61	Johnny Valentine and Rip Rogers	April 22, 1958	House show	Dallas, Texas	1	31		
62	Pepper Gomez (5) and Larry Chene (2)	May 23, 1958	House show	Houston, Texas	1	32		
63	Duke Keomuka (15) and John Tolos	June 24, 1958	House show	Dallas, Texas	1	45		
64	Pepper Gomez (6) and El Medico (3)	August 8, 1958	House show	Houston, Texas	2	165		
—	Vacated	August 22, 1958	—	—	—	—	Gomez and El Medico win the World Tag Team Championship	
65	Frank Valois (2) and Andre Bollet	January 20, 1959	House show	Dallas, Texas	1	N/A	Defeated Amazing Zuma and Johnny Walker in tournament final.	
66	Amazing Zuma (3) and Johnny Walker	(NLT) February 1959	House show	N/A	1	N/A		
67	Frank Valois (3) and Andre Bollet	March 10, 1959	House show	Dallas, Texas	2	28		
68	Chief Big Heart and Little Eagle	April 7, 1959	House show	Dallas, Texas	1	7		
69	Ben and Mike Sharpe	April 14, 1959	House show	Dallas, Texas	1	42		
—	Vacated	May 1959	—	—	—	—	championship vacated for undocumented reasons	
70	Corsica Joe and Corsica Jean	May 26, 1959	House show	Dallas, Texas	1	99	Defeated Angelo Martinelli and Luis Hernandez.	
71	Nick Kozak and Jerry Kozak	September 2, 1959	House show	San Antonio, Texas	1	N/A		
72	Danny McShain (2) and Bad Boy Hines	(NLT) November 1959	House show		1	N/A	Sometime after November 5, 1959.	
73	Cyclone Anaya (2) and Leo Garibaldi	December 15, 1959	House show	Dallas, Texas	1	N/A		
Championship history is unrecorded from December 15, 1959 to January 6, 1960.
74	Cyclone Anaya (3) and Pepper Gomez (7)	January 6, 1960	House show	N/A	1	N/A		
Championship history is unrecorded from January 6, 1960 to July 15, 1960.
—	Vacated	July 15, 1960	—	—	—	—	championship vacated for undocumented reasons	
75	Tony Borne and Danny McShain (3)	July 15, 1960	House show	Houston, Texas	1	N/A	Defeated Torbellino Blanco and El Gladiador.	
76	Ciclon Negro and Torbellino Blanco	(NLT) September 27, 1960	House show	N/A	1	N/A		
77	Maurice Vachon (2) and Paul Vachon	November 8, 1960	House show	Dallas, Texas	1	7		
78	Ciclon Negro and Torbellino Blanco	November 15, 1960	House show	Dallas, Texas	2	N/A		
79	Danny McShain (4) and Sputnik Monroe	(NLT) December 25, 1960	House show	N/A	1	N/A		
80	Ciclon Negro and Torbellino Blanco	December 19, 1960	House show	Houston, Texas	3	N/A		
81	Maurice Vachon (3) and Duke Keomuka (16)	December 1960	House show	N/A	1	31		
82	Sputnik Monroe (2) and Rocket Monroe	January 1, 1961	House show	Ft. Worth, Texas	1	19		
83	Pepper Gomez (8) and Hogan Wharton	January 20, 1961	House show	Houston, Texas	1	28	Defeated Sputnik Monroe and Jet Monroe.	
84	Tony Borne (2) and Don Manoukian	February 17, 1961	House show	Houston, Texas	1	7		
85	Pepper Gomez (9) and Dory Dixon	February 24, 1961	House show	Houston, Texas	1	77		
86	Angelo Poffo and Bronko Lubich	May 12, 1961	House show	Houston, Texas	1	N/A		
87	Pepper Gomez (10) and Dory Dixon (2)	June 1961	House show	Houston, Texas	2	N/A		
Championship history is unrecorded from June 1961 to September 18, 1961.
—	Vacated	1961	—	—	—	—	championship vacated for undocumented reasons	
88	Dick Hutton and Sam Steamboat	September 18, 1961	House show	Ft. Worth, Texas	1	14	Defeated Duke Keomuka and Kojika Saito in 4-team tournament final.	
89	The Mighty Yankees	October 2, 1961	House show	Ft. Worth, Texas	1	N/A		
Championship history is unrecorded from October 2, 1961 to November 1961.
90	Ricky Romero and Eric Rommel	November 1961	House show	N/A	1	15		
91	Nick Roberts and Stan Kowalski	November 16, 1961	House show	Amarillo, Texas	1	N/A	May only be recognized in Amarillo.	
Championship history is unrecorded from November 16, 1961 to January 11, 1962.
92	Jack Dalton and Jim Dalton	(NLT) January 11, 1962	House show	N/A	1	N/A		
—	Vacated	January 18, 1962-January 24, 1962	—	—	—	—	championship vacated for undocumented reasons	
93	Alberto Torres (2) and Ramon Torres	February 8, 1962	House show	Corpus Christi, Texas	1	N/A	Defeated Jack Dalton and Jim Dalton in tournament final; still champions as of March 14, 1962.	
Championship history is unrecorded from February 8, 1962 to May 1962.
94	Ciclon Negro (4) and Dory Dixon (3)	May 1962	House show	N/A	1	28		
95	Jack Dalton and Jim Dalton	May 29, 1962	House show	Dallas, Texas	2	N/A		
Championship history is unrecorded from May 29, 1962 to September 4, 1962.
96	Alaskan and Tarzan Tyler	September 4, 1962	House show		1	N/A		
Championship history is unrecorded from September 4, 1962 to June 28, 1963.
97	Nick and Jerry Kozak	June 28, 1963	House show	N/A	2	N/A		
Championship history is unrecorded from June 28, 1963 to May 17, 1964.
98	Rip Hawk and Swede Hanson	May 17, 1964	House show	N/A	1	N/A		
Championship history is unrecorded from May 17, 1964 to January 6, 1965.
99	Tony Borne (3) and Argentina Apollo	January 6, 1965	House show	San Antonio, Texas	1	N/A	Win a tag team title in tournament (may not be Texas title).	
Championship history is unrecorded from January 6, 1965 to July 11, 1966.
NWA Texas Tag Team Championship (Big Time Wrestling)
100	Nick Kozak (2) and Dory Dixon (4)	July 11, 1966	House show	Ft. Worth, Texas	1	N/A	Defeated Louie Tillet and Zebra Kid in 6-team tournament final.	
Championship history is unrecorded from July 11, 1966 to May 3, 1967.
101	Paul DeMarco and Luis Hernandez	May 3, 1967	House show	San Antonio, Texas	1	N/A	Defeated Jim Bernard and Tarzan Tyler in a tournament final for the vacant championship	
Championship history is unrecorded from May 3, 1967 to 1969.
102	Wahoo McDaniel and Antonio Pugliese	1969	House show	N/A	1	N/A		
Championship history is unrecorded from 1969 to March 16, 1970.
103	Killer Karl Kox and Great Malenko	March 16, 1970	House show	N/A	1	N/A		
Championship history is unrecorded from March 16, 1970 to December 17, 1970.
104	Kintarō Ōki and Pak Song	December 17, 1970	House show	N/A	1	N/A	Defeated Rufus R. Jones and Gorgeous George Jr.	
Championship history is unrecorded from December 17, 1970 to July 14, 1972.
105	Red Bastien and Billy Red Lyons	July 14, 1972	House show	Houston, Texas	1	84	Defeated the Alaskans (Franke Monte and Mike York).	
106	Chris Colt and Bobby Duncum	October 6, 1972	House show	Houston, Texas	1	N/A		
Championship history is unrecorded from October 6, 1972 to April 21, 1973.
107	Black Gordman and Goliath	April 21, 1973	House show	N/A	1	N/A		
108	Jose Lothario and Mil Mascaras	1973	House show	N/A	1	N/A		
109	Jose Lothario (2) and Ivan Putski	1973	House show	N/A	1	N/A		
110	Black Gordman and Goliath	May 26, 1973	House show	N/A	2	55		
111	Jose Lothario (3) and Ivan Putski (2)	July 20, 1973	House show	N/A	2	17		
112	Black Gordman and Goliath	August 6, 1973	House show	N/A	3	116		
113	Jose Lothario (4) and Mil Mascaras	November 30, 1973	House show	Houston, Texas	2	N/A		
Championship history is unrecorded from November 30, 1973 to 1974.
114	Red Bastien (2) and Tex McKenzie	1974	House show	N/A	1	N/A		
Championship history is unrecorded from 1974 to March 1975.
115	Jose Lothario (5) and Al Madril	March 1975	House show	N/A	1	6		
116	Gran Marcus and The Baron	March 7, 1975	House show	Houston, Texas	1	N/A	Still champions as of March 28, 1975.	
Championship history is unrecorded from March 28, 1975 to 1975.
117	Blackjack Lanza and Blackjack Mulligan	1975	House show	N/A	1	N/A		
—	Vacated	1973	—	—	—	—	championship vacated for undocumented reasons	
118	Jose Lothario (6) and Al Madril (2)	August 1975	House show	N/A	2	N/A		
119	Stan Hansen and Killer Tim Brooks	1976	House show	N/A	1	N/A		
120	Jose Lothario (7) and Rocky Johnson	March 3, 1976	House show	N/A	1	N/A		
121	Tony Charles (2) and Les Thornton	1977	House show	N/A	1	N/A		
122	Lord Al Hayes and Big O	1977	House show	N/A	1	N/A		
123	Jose Lothario (8) and Cien Caras	March 15, 1977	House show	N/A	1	31		
124	Bruiser Brody and Mike York	April 15, 1977	House show	Houston, Texas	1	126		
125	Bull Ramos and Captain USA	August 19, 1977	House show	Houston, Texas	1	N/A		
126	Gino Hernandez and Jimmy Snuka	(NLT) August 1977	House show	N/A	1	N/A	Sometime after May 6, 1977.	
127	Jose Lothario (9) and Al Madril (3)	(NLT) February 1978	House show	N/A	3	N/A	Possibly on October 21, 1977 in Houston, Texas	
128	Killer Tim Brooks and Leroy Brown	March 31, 1978	House show	Houston, Texas	1	7		
129	Kevin Von Erich and David Von Erich	April 7, 1978	House show	Houston, Texas	1	116		
130	Gino Hernandez (2) and Bruiser Brody (2)	August 1978	House show	Ft. Worth, Texas	1	34		
131	Kevin Von Erich and David Von Erich	September 4, 1978	House show	Ft. Worth, Texas	2	56		
—	Vacated	October 1978	—	—	—	—	The Von Erichs won the NWA American Tag Team Championship	
132	Mark Lewin and White Knight	October 30, 1978	House show	Ft. Worth, Texas	1	48	Defeated Mando Guerrero and Tiger Conway Jr. in a tournament final.	
133	Bull Ramos (2) and Tiger Conway Jr.	December 17, 1978	House show	Dallas, Texas	1	71	Defeated Lewin and Killer Karl Krupp.	
134	Bill White and El Gran Goliath	February 26, 1979	House show	Ft. Worth, Texas	1	20		
135	David Von Erich (3) and Tiger Conway Jr. (2)	March 18, 1979	House show	Dallas, Texas	1	N/A		
Championship history is unrecorded from March 18, 1979 to July 23, 1979.
—	Vacated	July 23, 1979	—	—	—	—	championship vacated for undocumented reasons	
136	Kerry Von Erich and Bruiser Brody (3)	July 23, 1979	House show	Ft. Worth, Texas	1	56	Defeated Mark Lewin and Killer Tim Brooks.	
137	The Spoiler and Mark Lewin (2)	September 17, 1979	House show	Ft. Worth, Texas	1	N/A		
—	Vacated	1979	—	—	—	—	championship vacated for undocumented reasons	
138	Kerry Von Erich (2) and Tiger Conway Jr. (3)	1980	House show	N/A	1	N/A		
Championship history is unrecorded from 1980 to 1980.
139	Gino Hernandez (3) and Pak Song (2)	1980	House show	N/A	1	N/A		
Championship history is unrecorded from 1980 to August 1, 1980.
140	Kerry Von Erich (3) and Sweet Brown Sugar	August 1, 1980	House show	Houston, Texas	1	N/A	Defeated Stan Stasiak and Tim Brooks.	
Championship history is unrecorded from August 1, 1980 to October 30, 1980.
—	Vacated	1980	—	—	—	—	championship vacated for undocumented reasons	
141	Mark Lewin (3) and The White Knight (2)	October 30, 1980	House show	Ft. Worth, Texas	1	N/A	Defeated Mando Guerrero and Tiger Conway Jr. in tournament final.	
Championship history is unrecorded from October 30, 1980 to 1980.
142	Killer Tim Brooks (2) and Stan Stasiak	1980	House show	N/A	1	N/A		
—	Vacated	1981	—	—	—	—	Stasiak was suspended	
143	Raul Mata and Billy White Cloud	January 12, 1981	House show	Ft. Worth, Texas	1	N/A	Defeated Killer Tim Brooks and Raul Castro.	
—	Deactivated	1981	—	—	—	—	Championship not promoted for years	
WCWA Texas Tag Team Championship
144	Tony Atlas and Skip Young	June 29, 1987	House show	Ft. Worth, Texas	1	190	Defeated Ted Arcidi and Texas Red in the finals of a tournament.	
145	John Tatum and Jack Victory	January 5, 1988	House show	Ft. Worth, Texas	1	40	Defeated Skip Young when Atlas no-showed for the match	
—	Vacated	January 29, 1988	—	—	—	—	After a match against the Fantastics (Tommy Rogers and Bobby Fulton)	
146	John Tatum and Jack Victory	February 14, 1988	House show	Ft. Worth, Texas	2	35	Tatum and Victory get belts back by high card draw.	
147	Steve Simpson and Shaun Simpson	March 20, 1988	House show	Ft. Worth, Texas	1	19		
148	John Tatum and Jack Victory	April 8, 1988	House show	Ft. Worth, Texas	3	108		
149	Steve Simpson and Shaun Simpson	July 25, 1988	House show	Temple, Texas	2	42		
150	John Tatum (4) and Jimmy Jack Funk	September 5, 1988	House show	Ft. Worth, Texas	1	7		
151	The Samoan Swat Team (Fatu and Samu)	September 12, 1988	House show	Ft. Worth, Texas	1	172		
—	Vacated	December 1988	—	—	—	—	The Samoan Swat Team left WCWA	
152	Beauty and The Beast (Terrence Garvin and The Beast)	March 3, 1989	House show	Ft. Worth, Texas	1	56	Defeated Chris Adams and Jeff Jarrett in tournament final.	
153	Steve Simpson and Shaun Simpson	April 28, 1989	House show	Ft. Worth, Texas	3	N/A		
—	Deactivated	1989	—	—	—	—	WCWA merged with the Continental Wrestling Association to create the United States Wrestling Association	

== Championship tournaments ==
=== NWA Texas Tag Team Championship Tournament (1952) ===
The NWA Texas Tag Team Tournament was a one-night single elimination tag team tournament held in Fort Worth, Texas on December 1, 1952, for the vacant NWA Texas Tag Team Championship.

Quarterfinals
BYE
BYE
Cyclone Anaya and Gory Guerrero	W
Marvin Jones and Jack O'Reilley
Roy Graham and Jack O'Brien	W
Andre Drapp and Ray Gunkel
BYE
BYE

Semifinals
Cowboy Carlson and Billy Varga
Cyclone Anaya and Gory Guerrero	W
Roy Graham and Jack O'Brien
Red Berry and Duke Keomuka	W

Final
Cyclone Anaya and Gory Guerrero	W
Red Berry and Duke Keomuka

=== NWA Texas Tag Team Championship Tournament (1967) ===
The NWA Texas Tag Team Tournament was a one-night single elimination tag team tournament held in San Antonio, Texas on May 3, 1967, for the vacant NWA Texas Tag Team Championship.

Quarterfinals
Paul DeMarco and Luis Hernandez	W
Kenji Shibuya and Mike Paidousis
BYE
BYE
Jim Bernard and Tarzan Tyler	W
Bob Ellis and Yamamot
BYE
Bearcat Wright and Buddy Moreno	W

Semifinals
Paul DeMarco and Luis Hernandez	W
BYE
Jim Bernard and Tarzan Tyler	W
Bearcat Wright and Buddy Moreno

Final
Paul DeMarco and Luis Hernandez	W
Jim Bernard and Tarzan Tyler

=== NWA Texas Tag Team Championship Tournament (1978) ===
The NWA Texas Tag Team Tournament was a one-night single elimination tag team tournament held in Fort Worth, Texas on October 30, 1978, for the vacant NWA Texas Tag Team Championship.

Semifinals
1	Mark Lewin and White Knight
4	Al Madril and Reggie Parks
3	Bruiser Brody and Bill White
2	Mando Guerrero and Tiger Conway Jr.

Final
Mark Lewin and White Knight	W
Mando Guerrero and Tiger Conway Jr.

=== WCCW Texas Tag Team Championship Tournament (1987) ===
The WCCW Texas Tag Team Tournament was a one-night single elimination tag team tournament held in Fort Worth, Texas on June 29, 1987, for the vacant WCCW Texas Tag Team Championship.

First round
Tony Atlas and Skip Young	W
Brian Adias and Al Perez
BYE
BYE
The Rock 'n' Roll RPMs (Tommy Lane and Mike Davis)	W
Al Madril and Manuel Villalobos
Matt Borne and Steve Simpson
Killer Brooks and Len Denton	W
Ted Arcidi and Texas Red	W
Bruiser Brody and The Spoiler
The Fantastics (Bobby Fulton and Tommy Rogers)	W
BYE
BYE
BYE
BYE
BYE

Quarterfinals
Tony Atlas and Skip Young	W
BYE
The Rock 'n' Roll RPMs
Killer Brooks and Len Denton	W
Ted Arcidi and Texas Red	W
The Fantastics
BYE
BYE

Semifinals
Tony Atlas and Skip Young	W
Killer Brooks and Len Denton
Ted Arcidi and Texas Red	W
BYE

Finals
Tony Atlas and Skip Young	W
Ted Arcidi and Texas Red

== See also ==
- List of National Wrestling Alliance championships
