= Ricki Starr =

American professional wrestler (1931–2014)

Personal information
- Born: Bernard Herman; 12 August 1931 St. Louis, Missouri, U.S.
- Died: 20 September 2014 (aged 83) London, England

Professional wrestling career
- Ring name: Ricki Starr
- Billed height: 5"10
- Billed weight: 207 lb (94 kg)
- Debut: 1952
- Retired: 1977

Bernard Herman (12 August 1931 – 20 September 2014) was an American-British professional wrestler, boxer and ballet dancer who spent his career in the United States, United Kingdom and Europe under the ring name Ricki Starr.

== Professional wrestling career ==
Starr started out his career as an amateur boxer, before switching to ballet and becoming so successful that he enjoyed a run on Broadway. Made his professional wrestling debut in 1952 in Texas. His wrestling gimmick was a ballet dancer where he did acrobatic moves in the ring. Starr popularized the airplane spin as his finisher, a move which called upon his ballet background to execute perfectly.

From 1957 to 1962, Starr worked in New York City for Capitol Wrestling Corporation.

In 1962, he made his first trip to England.

Later in his career, he wrestled in Mexico, France, Germany and Austria.

== Personal life and death ==
After retiring from wrestling in 1977, Starr resided in London until his death.

On September 20, 2014, Starr died at the age of 83.

== Championships and accomplishments ==
- Dallas Wrestling Club / Southwest Sports, Inc.
  - NWA Texas Tag Team Championship (2 times) – with Ray Gunkel (2)
  - NWA World Tag Team Championship (1 time) – with Ciclón Negro
- Pacific Northwest Wrestling
  - NWA Pacific Northwest Tag Team Championship (1 time) – with Pepper Gomez
- NWA Western States Sports
  - NWA Western States Tag Team Championship (1 time) – with Lord Alfred Hayes (1)
