= Joe Christie (wrestler) =

Canadian professional wrestler (1914–1999)

Personal information
- Born: Joseph Steven Kayorie; January 15, 1916 Buffalo, New York, US
- Died: January 6, 1999 (aged 82) Brantford, Ontario, Canada

Professional wrestling career
- Ring name(s): Joe Christie; Masked Marvel; Masked Mauler; Destroyer; Pierre Valois; Mask
- Billed height: 6 ft 3 in (191 cm)
- Billed weight: 235 lb (107 kg)
- Debut: 1946
- Retired: 1972

Joseph Steven Kayorie (January 15, 1916 – January 6, 1999) was an American-Canadian professional wrestler and boxer who spent his career in Canada, Toronto, Texas and New York City, best known for his ring name Joe Christie.

== Professional wrestling career ==
Kayorie was born in Buffalo, New York, in 1916, but he moved to Brantford, Ontario, Canada, by the age of two.

Kayorie started his pro wrestling career in the 1940s after meeting with Toronto promoter Frank Tunney, who convinced him to try out wrestling. Before this, Kayorie was a boxer who faced the likes of Tony Galento, Primo Carnera, and Danny Hodge. He was interested and went to Hamilton to learn the craft.

Christie then went to Detroit, which was in need of a wrestler, and opted to go there as long as he got to wear a mask. He adopted the identity of the Masked Marvel. Christie spent the early portions of his career working for Maple Leaf Wrestling and Eddie Quinn's promotion, both based in Canada, as well as in the Upstate area of the National Wrestling Alliance in New York. He held the Texas Brass Knuckles Title in 1954.

Terrorizing opponents as a heel, Christie had a shot to become the number one contender for the NWA World Heavyweight Title during a tournament on April 25, 1957; he defeated Ray Piret and Pepper Gomez in the first and second rounds respectively, but Ray Gunkel defeated him in the semi finals. Despite falling up short, he got a chance at the champion Lou Thesz in a thrilling two out of three falls bout just four days later, but was unable to win the prestigious prize. A few months later, Christie worked as The Masked Mauler until Verne Gagne unmasked him on November 29. On March 28, 1958, he challenged Thesz, this time for the NWA International Heavyweight Title, but was unable to win the belt.

On January 20, 1959, Joe Christie defeated Pepper Gomez to win the vacant NWA Texas Heavyweight Title. Three days later, he made his first successful title defense in a two out of three falls match against Danny McShain, winning after his opponent was disqualified. Christie looked to add the NWA World Heavyweight Title to his resume by challenging Pat O'Connor (wrestler) on February 11, but yet again failed to win that title. Nonetheless, he retained his Texas title against the likes of El Lobo and Les Welch over the following months, before dropping it in May to Luis Hernandez.

Christie won tag team gold on January 29, 1960, when he teamed with Pete "Man Mountain" Managoff to dethrone Cyclone Anaya & Pepper Gomez for the NWA World Tag Team Titles. However, they did not hold on to the titles for very long, as on February 12, Sheik Adnan Kassie and Hogan Wharton dethroned them. Six days later, Christie's time in Texas was at risk when he faced Nick Kozak in a match where the loser had to burn their trunks and leave the area, but fortunately for him, Christie won the match. Another contendership tournament for the NWA World Heavyweight Championship was held in March, and Christie entered it but like the last time he entered one, he came up short.

On April 1, 1960, Christie once again won the NWA Tag Team Titles with former opponent Danny McShain, overcoming Adnan Kassie & Hogan Wharton. This was another short-lived reign for Christie as the duo held the title for two weeks, dropping it to Pepper Gomez and Torbellino Blanco. On May 31, another reign with the belts occurred for Christie as he teamed with Les Crosby to beat Gomez and Blanco, but Gomez would soon regain the belts with Wilbur Snyder. On May 14, 1963, Christie's time in Texas came to an end as he lost a Loser Leaves Town No Disqualification match to Louie Tillet. On March 21, 1965, he unsuccessfully challenged Johnny Valentine for the NWA Toronto United States Heavyweight Title. Christie continued to wrestle regularly in Canada until wrestling his final matches in 1972.

In 1984, he was inducted into the Brantford Sports of Hall of Fame.

== Death ==
Kayorie died of a heart attack on January 6, 1999, at the age of 82 and was survived by his wife Helen.

== Championships and accomplishments ==
- Brantford Sports Hall Of Fame
  - Class of 1984
- NWA Big Time Wrestling
  - NWA Texas Heavyweight Championship (2 times)
  - NWA Brass Knuckles Championship (Texas version) (3 times)
  - NWA World Tag Team Championship (3 times) - with Danny McShain (1), Man Mountain Mangagoff (1) and Lenny Montana (1)
