= Lenny Montana =

American professional wrestler and actor (1926–1992)

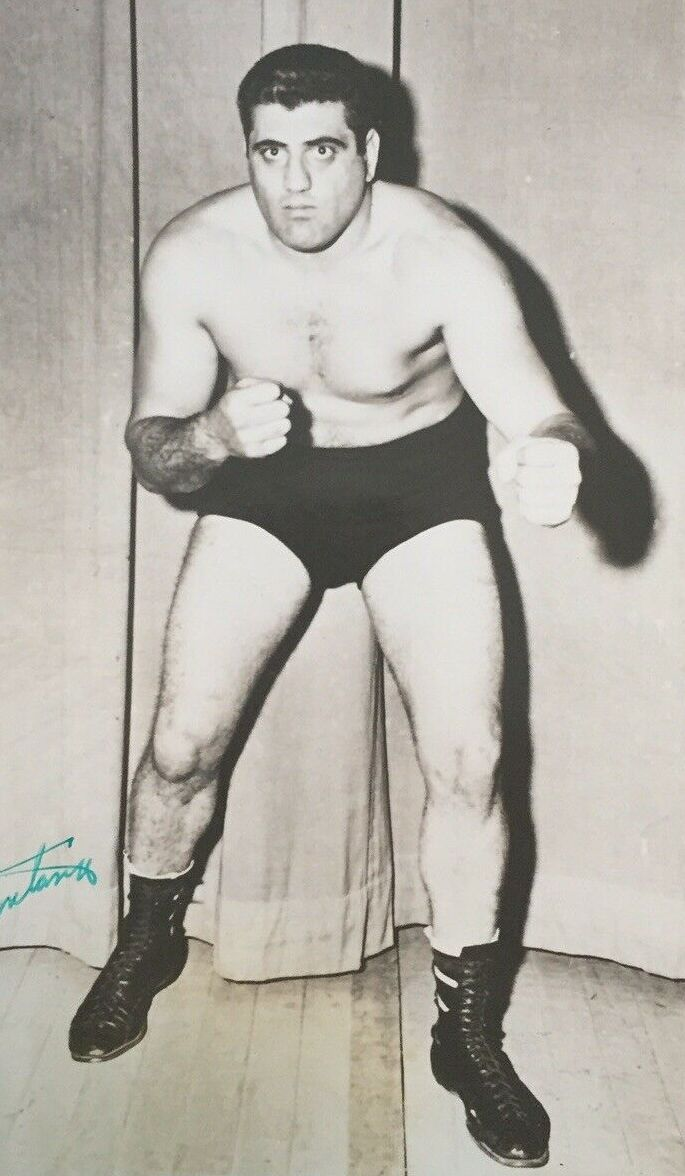
- Montana in 1955

Personal information
- Born: Leonardo Passafaro; March 13, 1926 Brooklyn, New York, U.S.
- Died: May 12, 1992 (aged 66) Lindenhurst, New York, U.S.

Professional wrestling career
- Ring names: Lenny Montana; Lenny Passaforo; Len Crosby; Len Montana; Chief Chewacki; The Zebra Kid
- Billed height: 6 ft 6 in (198 cm)
- Billed weight: 235 lb (107 kg)
- Billed from: San Francisco, California
- Debut: 1950
- Retired: 1972

Lenny Montana (born Leonardo Passafaro; March 13, 1926 – May 12, 1992) was an American actor who played the role of the feared hitman Luca Brasi in The Godfather. Before becoming an actor, he had a successful career as a professional wrestler and worked as an enforcer for the Colombo crime family.

== Early life ==
Leonardo Passafaro was born in Brooklyn, New York, on March 13, 1926. He was of Italian-American heritage and was fluent in both English and Italian.

== Career ==
Montana's wrestling career began in neighboring New Jersey in 1953. He wrestled under the name of the "Zebra Kid" and was billed at the height of 6'6". It was not long before he found success. Along with Golden Terror, he won the New Jersey tag team titles on April 4, 1953. He began to travel, wrestling in the Midwest. He soon won the NWA Central States Heavyweight Championship, defeating Dave Sims on October 1, 1953, in Kansas City. However, he lost the title on December 11, 1953, to Sonny Myers, who had previously held the title three times before defeating the Zebra Kid. Montana's final success of the 1950s was in 1956, winning the NWA Texas Tag Team Championship with Gene Kiniski, defeating Herb Freeman and Ray Gunkel on September 18 in Dallas under the alias Len Crosby. He also worked as a bouncer during this time to earn extra money.

== Later wrestling career ==
By the late 1950s, Montana was on the road with the Carnival Circuit as a wrestler. As a popular wrestler on the circuit, he met the then-unknown Eddie Sharkey in 1960. They struck up a friendship. After seeing what Sharkey could do, Montana recommended that he try his hand at professional wrestling. Montana also told Sharkey the then-unacknowledged truth about professional wrestling – that all the outcomes are predetermined. Later that year, Montana won the NWA Texas World Tag Team titles with Joe Christie, under the Len Crosby name. Then with Hard Boiled Haggerty, he won the AWA World Tag Team Championship on October 4, 1960, defeating Stan Kowalski and Tiny Mills (wrestling as Murder Inc.) in Minneapolis.

In a match against Verne Gagne, Montana suffered a broken leg, forcing Haggerty to choose a new partner. After recovering from his injury, in 1961 Montana began to wrestle in Florida. He moved to the Tampa Bay area and began to wrestle under The Zebra Kid alias. At his great size, he would often pin his opponents in less than one minute. The Zebra Kid had a notable feud with Eddie Graham; their battles sold out Fort Homer Hesterly Armory on many Tuesday nights in 1961. Things came to a head when Montana defeated Eddie Graham in a NWA Southern Heavyweight Championship (Georgia version) title match on May 1, 1962.

On November 23, 1962, he won the NWA (Georgia) Southern Tag Team titles with his partner Gypsy Joe, defeating "Grizzly" Jake Smith and Luke Brown. Montana went on to form a powerful partnership with Tarzan Tyler, in which they won three titles. First, the NWA International Tag Team Titles on April 9, 1963 defeating Ted Evans and Chief Little Eagle, then again winning the NWA International Tag Team Titles later in June 1963, defeating the billed champions Chief Little Eagle and Dick Steinborn. Finally, they won the NWA World Tag Team Championship in Georgia during October 1963 when they defeated Karl Von Brauner and Kurt Von Brauner. Montana was due to be Gorilla Monsoon's tag team partner in 1964 but, at the last minute, Monsoon took on The African Savage as his partner instead. Montana had been interested in acting and was meeting with casting agents in Los Angeles at the same time as he was due to team up with Bison. Montana began to wrestle less and less, and went into semi-retirement, although he appeared in matches until his acting career took off in the early 1970s.

== Working for the Colombo crime family ==
Montana became involved with the Colombo crime family in the late 1960s. He was tall and very heavily built, and his talents were mostly as an enforcer and an arsonist. He told the cast and crew of The Godfather how he would tie a tampon to the tail of a mouse, dip it in kerosene, light it, and let the mouse run through a building, or he would put a lit candle in front of a cuckoo clock so that when the clock's bird popped out the candle would be knocked over and start a fire. Eventually, he was jailed at Rikers Island. After being released, he acted as a bodyguard for many senior members of the Colombo family.

== Work on The Godfather ==
The filming of The Godfather faced strong opposition from the Italian-American Civil Rights League, with disputes headed by Joe Colombo and Frank Sinatra threatening its whole production. The producer, Al Ruddy, eventually made a deal with the league and Colombo to cut the word Mafia (which was used only once in the script) and the League backed the production of the film. This meant mobsters were present on the set of The Godfather. In 1971, when Montana was acting as a bodyguard for a senior Colombo family member, he met Francis Ford Coppola and Al Ruddy. After being introduced to the 6'6" 320-pound Montana, they quickly cast him in the role of Luca Brasi. When Bettye McCartt, Ruddy's assistant, broke her watch, Montana offered to get her a new one. A week later, Montana returned with a "gift from the boys" – an antique diamond watch. He was picked for the part after the original actor playing the character died of a stroke. This was Montana's first credited film appearance. Montana had little screen time in the film, but his notable height and physique caught the eye of producers, and he appeared in several movies and television programs after The Godfather.

== Film and TV career ==
One of the first of these roles was the Italian spoof film L'altra faccia del padrino (English: The Funny Face of the Godfather) in 1973. Montana had the role of Saro, and an artist's rendition of Montana appeared on the film's poster. He established himself as an efficient character actor and appeared in Patty (1976), Fingers (1978) as the pizzeria owner Luchino, Matilda (1978), They Went That-A-Way & That-A-Way (1978), The Jerk (1979), Seven (1979), Below the Belt (1980), Defiance (1980), Battle Creek Brawl (1980) alongside Jackie Chan, Evilspeak (1981), ...All the Marbles (1981), Pandemonium (1982) and Blood Song (1982). He also acted on television, appearing in Search (1973), Strike Force (1975), which starred a young Richard Gere; Contract on Cherry Street (1977), which featured Frank Sinatra; Kojak (1978) and Magnum, P.I. (1982). He was usually cast as "muscle" for hire or an intimidating mobster.

== Retirement and later life ==
Montana retired from acting after appearing in the B movie Blood Song (1982), which he also co-wrote. He died on May 12, 1992, of a heart attack in Lindenhurst, New York. He was 66 years old.

Montana is portrayed by Lou Ferrigno in the 2022 miniseries The Offer.

== Filmography ==
| Year | Title | Role | Notes |
|---|---|---|---|
| 1969 | Change of Habit | Grocer | Uncredited |
| 1972 | The Godfather | Luca Brasi (Enforcer) | |
| 1973 | The Funny Face of the Godfather | Saro | |
| 1975 | Strike Force | Italian dockworker | |
| 1976 | Patty | The Racketeer | |
| 1977 | Contract on Cherry Street | Phil Lombardi | |
| 1978 | Matilda | Hood #1 | |
| 1978 | They Went That-A-Way & That-A-Way | Brick | |
| 1978 | Fingers | Luchino | |
| 1979 | Seven | The Kahuna | |
| 1979 | The Jerk | Con Man | |
| 1980 | Defiance | Whacko | |
| 1980 | The Big Brawl | John | |
| 1980 | Below the Belt | | |
| 1981 | Evilspeak | Jake | |
| 1981 | ...All the Marbles | Jerome, Eddie's Bodyguard | |
| 1982 | Pandemonium | Coach | |
| 1982 | Blood Song | Skipper | Final film role |

== Championships and accomplishments ==
- American Wrestling Association
  - AWA World Tag Team Championship (1 time) – with Hard Boiled Haggerty
- Central States Wrestling
  - NWA Central States Heavyweight Championship (1 time)
- Georgia Championship Wrestling
  - NWA Southern Heavyweight Championship (Georgia version) (1 time)
  - NWA International Tag Team Championship (Georgia version) (2 times) – with Tarzan Tyler
  - NWA Southern Tag Team Championship (Georgia version) (1 time) – with Gypsy Joe
  - NWA World Tag Team Championship (Georgia version) (1 time) – with Tarzan Tyler
- Southwest Sports, Inc.
  - NWA Texas Tag Team Championship (1 time) – with Gene Kiniski
  - NWA World Tag Team Championship (Texas version) (1 time) – with Joe Christie
