= Miguel Guzmán =

Miguel Guzmán may refer to:

- Miguel Guzmán (golfer) (born 1961), Argentine professional golfer
- Miguel Guzmán (footballer) (born 1996), Mexican footballer
- Miguel Guzmán (wrestler) (1916–1973), Mexican professional wrestler
