= World Light Heavyweight Championship (National Wrestling Association) =

Details
- Promotion: National Boxing Association (April 1930 – September 1930); National Wrestling Association (September 1930-early 1960s)
- Date established: April 4, 1930
- Date retired: Early 1960s
Statistics
- First champion: Hugh Nichols
- Final champion: Gory Guerrero
- Most reigns: Danny McShain (10 reigns)
- Longest reign: Frank Stojack (1,573 days)
- Shortest reign: Danny McShain (7 days)

The National Wrestling Association World Light Heavyweight Championship was a professional wrestling championship originally sanctioned by the National Boxing Association (NBA) and subsequently sanctioned by the National Wrestling Association (NWA), an offshoot of the NBA. The championship had an upper limit of 175 lb (79 kg), anyone above that limit was considered a heavyweight. The championship was created in 1930 and abandoned in the early 1960s.

In 1930 the NBA decided to try and regulate professional wrestling in the way they had tried to regulate boxing in the United States. One of their first steps was to try and clear up the World Championship picture in the hopes of establishing one generally recognized championship. To that end they sanctioned a number of world championship tournaments, including one for the World Light Heavyweight Championship. The NBA requested that contenders post as $2,500 forfeit to enter the tournament. Only three light heavyweights paid the forfeit, which meant that Pinki Gardner faced Joe Banaskie, and the winner of that match would face Hugh Nichols for the championship. Nichols won the bout and became the first NBA sanctioned World Light Heavyweight Champion. In September 1930 the NBA formed the National Wrestling Association to allow the organization to focus on pro wrestling. In 1948 a number of promoters joined together to form the National Wrestling Alliance, forming a network of promoters across the United States and within a year or two the Alliance would usurp the Association as the controlling organization. In 1958 then champion Frank Stojack was stripped of the Association championship due to not having defended it for a long period of time. Subsequently, the Association decided to sanction the Alliance's NWA World Light Heavyweight Championship when Dory Dixon defeated Al Kashey in a match overseen by presidents of both the National Wrestling Association and the National Wrestling Alliance. In the early 1960s the Association existed in name only, withdrawing their recognition of the Alliance championships but not sanctioning a separate championship.

Hugh Nichols was the first World Light Heavyweight Champion, winning the championship on April 4, 1940. The last officially sanctioned champion was Gory Guerrero, who won the championship on July 30, 1960. Danny McShain held the championship a total of ten times during his career, a record for most reigns. Frank Stojack's reign, lasting from August 10, 1953 until he was stripped of the championship on November 30, 1957, is the longest reign totaling 1,573 days. Danny McShain's third and seventh reign as champion only lasted seven days, although due to gaps in the championship history the possibility exists that someone else had a shorter reign.

== Title history ==
Key
No.	Overall reign number
Reign	Reign number for the specific champion
Days	Number of days held
N/A	Unknown information
(NLT)	Championship change took place "no later than" the date listed

No.	Champion	Championship change			Reign statistics		Notes	Ref.
No.	Champion	Date	Event	Location	Reign	Days	Notes	Ref.
1	Hugh Nichols	April 4, 1930	Live event	Cincinnati, Ohio	1	1,431	Defeated Joe Banaski in a tournament final to become the first champion. Frank Wolf defeated Nichols in March 1933 in Dallas, Texas, but the NBA stated that Nichols was fouled and Nichols remained champion. Nichols defeated Wolf in a July 1933 rematch in Oklahoma City, Oklahoma.	
2	Leroy McGuirk	March 5, 1934	Live event	Tulsa, Oklahoma	1	1,125	Ted Christy defeated McGuirk on January 13, 1936 and was recognized as champion in California only; McGuirk continued to be recognized by the NWA.	
3	Bobby Chick	April 3, 1937	Live event	Tulsa, Oklahoma	1	46		
4	Hugh Nichols	May 19, 1937	Live event	Oklahoma City, Oklahoma	2	18		
5	Wild Red Berry	June 6, 1937	Live event	Oklahoma	1	127		
6	Danny McShain	October 11, 1937	Live event	Hollywood, California	1	244		
7	Leroy McGuirk	June 12, 1938	Live event	N/A	2	146		
8	Danny McShain	November 5, 1938	Live event	Hollywood, California	2	(Note: The exact date McShain lost the championship is uncertain, which means that the championship reign lasted between 391 and 421 days.)	Jesse James defeated McShain by disqualification in March 1939 in California. McShain continues to be recognized by NWA as the championship could not change hands by disqualification; James was recognized as champion in California only.	
Championship history is unrecorded from November 5, 1938 to December 1939.
9	Bob Gregory	December 1939	Live event	N/A	1	(Note: The exact date Bob Gregory won the championship is uncertain, which means that the championship reign lasted between 1 and 143 days.)		
Championship history is unrecorded from December 1939 to April 22, 1940.
10	Jesse James	April 22, 1940	Live event	Tulsa, Oklahoma	1	133		
11	Wild Red Berry	September 2, 1940	Live event	Hollywood, California	2	336		
12	Paavo Katonan	August 4, 1941	Live event	Hollywood, California	1	21		
13	Danny McShain	August 25, 1941	Live event	Hollywood, California	3	7		
14	Wild Red Berry	September 1, 1941	Live event	Hollywood, California	3	91		
15	Billy Varga	December 1, 1941	Live event	Hollywood, California	1	21		
16	Wild Red Berry	December 22, 1941	Live event	Hollywood, California	4	(Note: The exact date that Red Berry lost the championship is uncertain, which means that the championship reign lasted between 222 and 251 days.)	Paavo Katonan defeated Berry by disqualification on May 18, 1941 but the championship change was only acknowledged in Oklahoma. Berry defeated Katonan on June 1 to end the local reign.	
17	Billy Raborn	August 1942	Live event	Tulsa, Oklahoma	1	(Note: The exact date where Billy Raborn won the championship is uncertain, which means that the championship reign lasted between 204 and 233 days.)		
18	Billy Varga	March 22, 1943	Live event	Hollywood, California	2	35		
19	Gorilla Ramos	April 26, 1943	Live event	Hollywood, California	1	168		
20	Wild Red Berry	October 11, 1943	Live event	Hollywood, California	5	77		
21	The Gray Mask	December 27, 1943	Live event	Hollywood, California	1	77		
22	Gorilla Ramos	March 13, 1944	Live event	Hollywood, California	2	14		
23	The Gray Mask	March 27, 1944	Live event	Hollywood, California	2	28		
24	Wild Red Berry	April 24, 1944	Live event	Hollywood, California	6	231		
25	Dick Trout	December 11, 1944	Live event	Hollywood, California	1	42		
26	Danny McShain	January 22, 1945	Live event	Hollywood, California	4	63		
27	Dick Trout	March 26, 1945	Live event	Hollywood, California	2	21		
28	Danny McShain	April 16, 1945	Live event	Hollywood, California	5	147		
29	Wild Red Berry	September 10, 1945	Live event	Hollywood, California	7	126		
30	Ernie Piluso	January 14, 1946	Live event	Hollywood, California	1	91		
31	Danny McShain	April 15, 1946	Live event	Hollywood, California	6	30		
32	Ernie Piluso	May 15, 1946	Live event	Hollywood, California	2	96		
33	Martino Angelo	August 19, 1946	Live event	Hollywood, California	1	28		
34	Danny McShain	September 16, 1946	Live event	Hollywood, California	7	7		
35	Martino Angelo	September 23, 1946	Live event	Hollywood, California	2	126		
36	Danny McShain	January 27, 1947	Live event	Hollywood, California	8	14		
37	Martino Angelo	February 10, 1947	Live event	Hollywood, California	3	84		
38	Danny McShain	May 5, 1947	Live event	Hollywood, California	9	120		
39	Wild Red Berry	September 2, 1947	Live event	San Diego, California	8	11		
40	Danny McShain	September 13, 1947	Live event	Visalia, California	10	(Note: The exact date McShain lost the championship is uncertain, which means that the championship reign lasted between 1 day and 3,710 days.)		
41	Wild Red Berry	1947	Live event	San Diego, California	9	(Note: The exact date Berry lost the championship is uncertain, which means that the championship reign lasted between 1 day and 3,710 days.)		
42	Jan Blears	November 10, 1947	Live event	Phoenix, Arizona	1	(Note: The exact date Blears lost the championship is uncertain, which means that the championship reign lasted between 1 day and 126 days.)		
Championship history is unrecorded from November 10, 1947 to March 15, 1948.
43	Jackie Nichols	March 15, 1948	Live event	Phoenix, Arizona	1	71		
44	Duke Keomuka	May 25, 1948	Live event	Phoenix, Arizona	1	(Note: The exact date Keomuka lost the championship is uncertain, which means that the championship reign lasted between 1 day and 217 days.)	Nichols was still billed as champion in Bakersfield, California on June 2, 1948	
Championship history is unrecorded from December 28, 1948 to May 25, 1948.
45	Jack Curtis	December 28, 1948 (NLT)	Live event	N/A	1	(Note: The exact date Jack Curtis won the championship is uncertain, which means that his championship reign lasted between 423 and 639 days.)	Held the Louisiana version of the world title, listed as National Wrestling Association champion in a Monroe, Louisiana newspaper on December 28, 1948	
Championship history is unrecorded from December 28, 1948 to February 24, 1950.
—	Vacated	February 24, 1950	—	—	—	—	Championship declared vacant for undocumented reasons	
46	Andy Tremaine	April 18, 1950	Live event	El Paso, Texas	1	1,210	Defeated Monte LaDue. Declined the opportunity to wrestle the National Wrestling Alliance champion to unify the championships. Retires as champion in 1952.	
47	Frank Stojack	August 10, 1953	Live event	Spokane, Washington	1	1,573	Defeated National Wrestling Alliance champion Gypsy Joe to win the National Wrestling Alliance championship, title reign is also recognized by the National Wrestling Association, sanctioning the National Wrestling Alliance championship from that point on.	
—	Vacated	November 30, 1957	—	—	—	—	Championship vacated due to inactivity. Frank Stojack subsequently announces his retirement	
†	Moe Smith	October 29, 1958	Live event	Carson City, Nevada			Defeated Luigi Macera in the final of a tournament originally supposed to be for the NWA (Alliance) championship, but recognition was withdrawn before the tournament took place. Smith continued to claim the title in Reno, Nevada, Idaho and Utah until at least November 14, 1962	
48	Dory Dixon	February 13, 1959	Live event	Mexico City, Mexico	1	289	Defeated Al Kashey, the #1 contender appointed by the National Wrestling Association, to be recognized by the National Wrestling Alliance. Presidents from both organizations in attendance.	
49	Ray Mendoza	November 29, 1959	Live event	Guadalajara, Jalisco, Mexico	1	244		
50	Gory Guerrero	July 30, 1960	Live event	Mexico City, Mexico	1	(Note: The exact date that the National Wrestling Association withdrew their recognition is unclear, which means that the length of this reign is too uncertain to calculate.)		
—	Deactivated	1960s	—	—	—	—	The National Wrestling Association ceased to sanction the championship in the early 1960s.	

== See also ==
- World Light Heavyweight Championship
- World Light Heavyweight Championship (Australian version)
