= Apache Bull Ramos =

American professional wrestler (1937–2006)

Personal information
- Born: Manuel Ramos; August 3, 1937 Houston, Texas, U.S.
- Died: May 27, 2006 (aged 68) Houston, Texas, U.S.
- Cause of death: Massive shoulder infection
- Spouse: Brenda Ramos (his death)

Professional wrestling career
- Ring name: Apache Bull Ramos
- Billed height: 5 ft 10 in (1.78 m)
- Billed weight: 350 lb (159 kg)
- Trained by: Danny McShain; Cyclone Anaya; David Weinstein
- Debut: 1956
- Retired: 1981

Manuel Ramos (August 3, 1937 – May 27, 2006) was an American professional wrestler, better known as Apache Bull Ramos. From his debut in 1956 until the 1970s, he primarily worked as a heel and had notable feuds with Bruno Sammartino, Dutch Savage, Jimmy Snuka, Terry Funk, and Mil Máscaras. He traveled to Japan, Korea, and Australia to wrestle.

== Professional wrestling career ==
Ramos grew up in Houston and attended wrestling matches with his uncle and father. In the early 1960s, his uncle suggested that Ramos enter the profession. He, however, was boxing at the time and turned down the idea. He later met Paul Boesch, a wrestling promoter, who helped him get into wrestling. He entered the professional wrestling business in 1964 and was trained by Danny McShain, Cyclone Anaya, and David Weinstein.

In Los Angeles, he feuded with Mil Mascaras. It culminated in a Hair vs Mask match, which Ramos lost, causing him to have his head shaved. He later had a short run in the World Wide Wrestling Federation, managed by Col. Homer O'Dell, as an opponent to the champion Bruno Sammartino. Sammartino defeated Ramos by submission in defense of the title, in the first show held at the "new" Madison Square Garden in 1968.

In the Pacific Northwest, Ramos feuded with Dutch Savage, a feud that lasted approximately five years. He also feuded with Ricky Hunter in the Pacific Northwest. Ramos became a popular heel in Oregon after breaking Lonnie Mayne's arm, causing the bone to stick out of the skin. In the same territory, Ramos won tag team gold with future governor Jesse Ventura.

He wrestled until the 1980s.

== Professional wrestling style and persona ==
When he first began wrestling, promoters wanted him to wrestle as an Italian named John Albano, but Ramos rejected the idea. When he first began wrestling, Ramos only weighed 200 lbs. He continued to gain weight throughout his career, weighing 350 pounds at his heaviest.

Ramos weighed over 300 pounds and was strong on promos. As a result, he was able to draw massive heat during his matches. He began his career wrestling as Bull Ramos, a Native American character. In the 1970s, Wrestling World magazine wrote about Ramos in kayfabe, saying that Ramos was born in “an adobe hut on the San Carlo, New Mexico, Indian reservation” and was a “redskinned dynamite, dressed in an Indian vest and wearing an Indian headhand. He even invented a match that today is known as the Texas Bullrope Match, where one is tied to his opponent using rope and must drag him to all 4 corners of the ring.”

== Personal life ==
In addition to English, he was fluent in Spanish.

After he quit wrestling, Ramos ran a towing service in Houston. He learned about the business from a fellow wrestler named Nick Kozak. He already had a daughter, Julia Ramos, and sons, Manuel Ramos, Jr., and John "Bull" Bush prior to marrying his wife named Brenda Jean Long. He took her with him on his first tour of Australia, but she returned to the United States to birth their first child, Angelina Ramos, followed by their second child, Amanda Ramos.

Ramos suffered from diabetes, which caused him to go blind. He had a big toe amputated due to an infection caused by a piece of glass. In addition, he was on kidney dialysis three times a week. He lost over 100 pounds because of his diabetes. On May 27, 2006, Ramos died at the age of 68 due to a massive shoulder infection.

== In popular culture ==
Ramos is the subject of a song by The Mountain Goats, titled "The Ballad of Bull Ramos", on their 2015 album Beat the Champ - a concept album about professional wrestling.

== Championships and accomplishments ==
- Mid-South Wrestling
  - Mid-South Mississippi Heavyweight Championship (1 time)
  - Mid-South North American Heavyweight Championship (Tri-State version) (1 time)
- NWA Big Time Wrestling
  - NWA Texas Tag Team Championship (2 times) – with Tiger Conway, Jr. (1) and Big John Studd (1)
- NWA Hollywood Wrestling
  - NWA Americas Heavyweight Championship (1 time)
  - NWA Americas Six-Man Tag Team Championship (1 time) – with Ray Gordon and Mike Riker
  - NWA Americas Tag Team Championship (2 times) – with Black Gordman
- NWA Rocky Mountain
  - NWA Rocky Mountain Heavyweight Championship (1 time)
  - NWA Western States Heavyweight Championship (2 times)
  - NWA Western States Tag Team Championship (1 time) – with The Beast
- Pacific Northwest Wrestling
  - NWA Pacific Northwest Heavyweight Championship (4 times)
  - NWA Pacific Northwest Tag Team Championship (3 times) – with Clay Spencer (1), Ripper Collins (1), and The Iron Sheik (1)
- Ring Around The Northwest Newsletter
  - Wrestler of the Year (1972–1973)
- Western States Sports
  - NWA Brass Knuckles Championship (Amarillo version) (1 time)
- Texas All-Pro Wrestling
  - TAP Heavyweight Championship (1 time)
- World Championship Wrestling (Australia)
  - World Brass Knuckles Championship
