= Black Guzmán =

Mexican professional wrestler

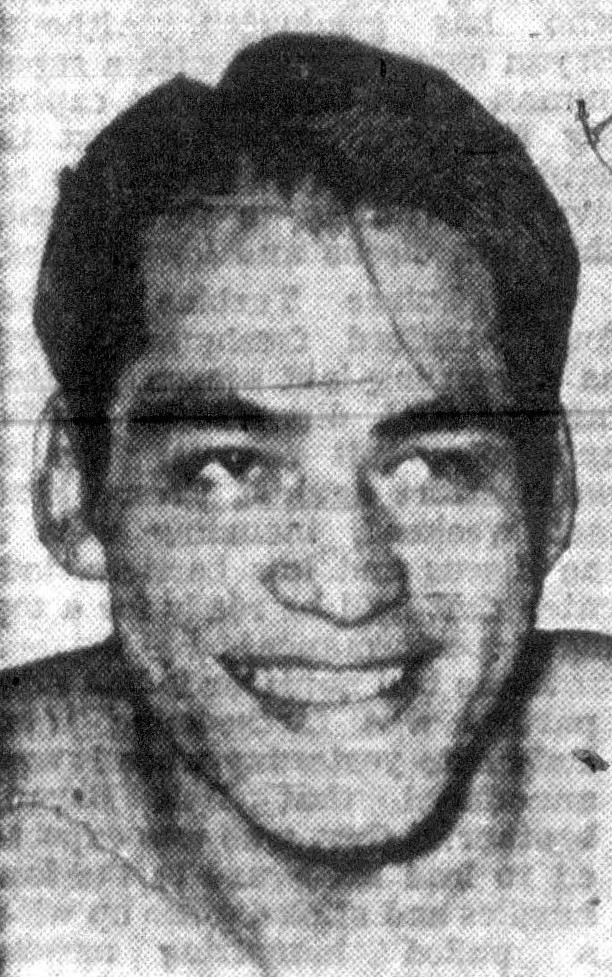
- Black Guzmán, circa 1951

Personal information
- Born: Miguel Wenceslao Guzmán Huerta; 1916 Tulancingo, Mexico
- Died: December 1, 1973 (aged 56–57) Mexico City, Mexico
- Family: El Santo (brother); Pantera Negra (brother); Jimmy Guzmán (brother); El Hijo del Santo (nephew); Axxel (great-nephew); Santo Jr. (great-nephew); Rocker II (great-nephew)

Professional wrestling career
- Ring name(s): Black Guzmán; Miguel Gúzman
- Billed from: Mexico City, Mexico
- Trained by: Ramon Romo

Miguel Wenceslao Guzmán Huerta (1916 – December 1, 1973), best known by his ring name Black Guzmán, was a Mexican professional wrestler. His ring name was a nickname he had earned due to his tan skin color. Guzmán's style was centered on the headscissors, pioneering several variations of the headscissors takedown, and was one of the first professional wrestlers to work a fast-paced, aerial style. He was the first Mexican National Light Heavyweight Champion, winning a tournament in 1943. Guzmán also competed under his real name for Texas-based Southwest Sports, Inc. for a number of years, including eight reigns as the NWA Texas Heavyweight Champion and one run with the NWA Texas Tag Team Championship alongside Rito Romero.

Guzmán was the brother of fellow wrestlers El Santo, Pantera Negra and Jimmy Guzmán, as well as the uncle of El Hijo del Santo and the great-uncle of Axxel, Santo Jr. and Rocker II.

== Biography ==
Guzmán was born in 1916 in Tulancingo in the Mexican state of Hidalgo, to Jesús Guzmán Campos and Josefina Huerta Márquez as the fourth of seven children. The family moved to Mexico City in the 1920s in order go earn a living. When old enough Guzmán began training for his professional wrestling career alongside his younger brother Rodolfo, who later became known as El Santo.

Guzmán is part of an extended professional wrestling family, that includes his brothers Pantera Negra and Jimmy Guzmán. He is the uncle of El Hijo del Santo and the great-uncle of wrestlers Axxel, Santo Jr. and Rocker II.

== Professional wrestling career ==
Guzmán made his professional wrestling debut in the early 1930s working under his real name. He quickly earned the nickname "Black Guzmán", due to his dark skin. He also earned the nickname "Indio de Tulacingo" (Spanish for "Indian from Tulacingo"). Black Guzmán was initially a bigger star than his younger brother Rodolfo as he pioneered a high flying, fast-paced style of wrestling focused around the headscissors takedown. His fame was later surpassed by Rodolfo, who adopted the name "El Santo". On December 16, 1941, Black Guzmán defeated Tarzán López to win the World Middleweight Championship, one of the top titles in Mexico at the time. Guzmán only held the title for 57 days before López regained it. Two years later Guzmán won a tournament to become the first ever Mexican National Light Heavyweight Championship in March. Guzmán held the title until September 20, 1944, when he lost the title to Gorilla Ramos.

By the mid-1940s Guzmán had started working across the border in Texas for Southwest Sports, Inc. (Later World Class Championship Wrestling), run by Ed McLemore. In Texas he was billed as "Miguel Guzmán" and despite being a bit older and a bit slower than when he headlined in Mexico he still held several championships and headlined several cards throughout the 1940s and 1950s. He won his first Texas based title on August 1, 1947, when he defeated Sonny Myers for the vacant Texas Heavyweight Championship. Guzmán would win the title an additional two times before Southwest Sports, Inc. joined the National Wrestling Alliance, renaming the title the "NWA Texas Heavyweight Championship". Guzmán would win the title a total of eight times, defeating Yukon Eric, Danny McShain, Wild Red Berry, Sonny Myers, Danny Savish and Wayne Martin for the title. Guzmán vacated the title in 1951 due to injuries. Guzmán was also a successful tag team competitor, teaming with Rito Romero to win the Texas Tag Team Championship on three occasions. The team defeated Al Lovelock and Danny McShain to win the title the first time, losing them to Duke Keomuka and Danny Savich in November 1950. On April 4, 1951, Guzman wrestled then World Heavyweight Champion (LA Version) "Baron" Michele Leone at the Los Angeles Olympic Auditorium. The match was in front of a sold-out crowd of 10,400 and ended in a 60-minute time limit draw. On February 1, 1952, Guzmán teamed with Ray Gunkel to hold the Texas Tag Team title for three weeks. Guzmán and Romero joined forces twice more to win the Tag Team title, defeating Duke Keomuka and Mr. Moto. The team ended their third and final run with the title in May 1954, when they lost to Ivan Kamlikoff and Karol Krauser.

Guzmán's career slowed down by the mid-1950s, and he retired in the 1960s. On December 1, 1973, Guzmán died.

== Championships and accomplishments ==
- Empresa Mexicana de la Lucha Libre
  - Mexican National Light Heavyweight Championship (1 time)
  - World Middleweight Championship (1 time)
- Southwest Sports, Inc.
  - NWA Texas Heavyweight Championship (8 times)
  - NWA Texas Tag Team Championship (4 times) – with Rito Romero (3) and Ray Gunkel
