= Red Berry (wrestler) =

American professional wrestler, manager (1906–1973)

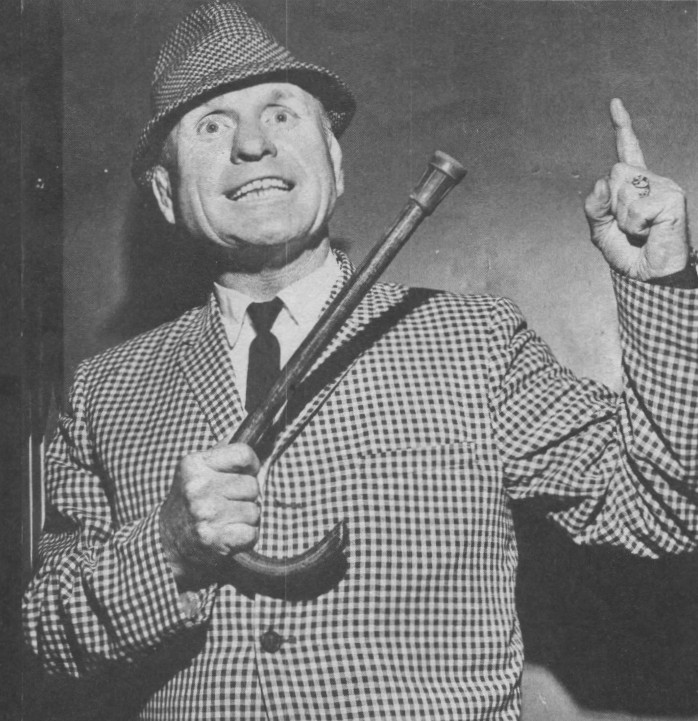
- Berry, circa 1972

Personal information
- Born: Ralph L. Berry; November 20, 1906 Conway Springs, Kansas, U.S.
- Died: July 21, 1973 (aged 66) Pittsburg, Kansas, U.S.

Professional wrestling career
- Ring name: Red Berry
- Billed height: 5 ft 8 in (1.73 m)
- Billed weight: 195 lb (88 kg)
- Debut: 1926
- Retired: 1965

Ralph L. Berry (November 20, 1906 – July 21, 1973), better known by the ring name "Wild" Red Berry, was an American professional wrestler.

Berry was a nine-time NWA World Light Heavyweight Champion and an important smaller wrestler of the 1930s to the 1950s, as well as a famous professional wrestling manager in his later years.

Standing only 5'8", Berry had to find creative ways to win his matches, which is why he oftentimes turned to rule breaking. His defiant in-ring actions made him one of the most hated professional wrestlers of the 1930s, 1940s and 1950s. Berry did not care, as his disregard for authority eventually led him to more than fifteen professional wrestling championship reigns over the course of his lengthy career.

Berry continued his deviant behavior long after his in-ring career came to a close. As manager to such top stars as Gorilla Monsoon, The Fabulous Kangaroos and Bull Ramos, Berry was not above using his signature cane as a weapon.

== Professional wrestling career ==
Berry started off as a boxer in 1923, eventually winning the Kansas State Middleweight Championship. After breaking both of his hands, he decided to change his sport to professional wrestling. His first recorded match was in 1926 but he wrestled at carnivals prior to that date. By 1937, he had won his first title, the National Wrestling Association's World Light Heavyweight Championship. Berry held the World Light Heavyweight Championship nine times between 1937 and 1947, trading it often with Danny McShain. Berry and McShain feuded for years in Southern California.

In 1947, Berry suffered an arm injury and infection that made him sit out for a year. After the advent of the National Wrestling Alliance (NWA) in 1948, he held several regional championships for NWA member promotions, including the NWA Texas Heavyweight Championship twice in 1949, the NWA Arkansas Junior Heavyweight Championship in 1954, and the NWA Central States Heavyweight Championship in 1952 and 1957. In his feuds, Berry usually played the heel, or villain, except in his hometown of Pittsburg, where he was well-beloved.

Berry began managing wrestlers in 1958, including The Fabulous Kangaroos (Al Costello and Roy Heffernan). He also managed Hans "The Great" Mortier. He was often seen at ringside wearing a warmup jacket with the phrase, "I am Right" emblazoned on the back. When The Fabulous Kangaroos were feuding with The Scufflin' Hillbillies in the northeast, Hillbillies manager "Cousin Alfred" appeared with a jacket that said "He's Wrong!" on the back.

Berry was also the manager of Gorilla Monsoon, after Bobby Davis, from 1967 to 1969 during Monsoon's heel days. He would speak for Monsoon in promos, because Monsoon's character was a mute from Manchuria (kayfabe) and took Monsoon and Killer Kowalski to the World Wide Wrestling Federation's (WWWF, now WWE) United States Tag Team Championship. Berry also managed Monsoon in a series of matches against WWWF World Heavyweight Champion Bruno Sammartino during the Monsoon-Sammartino feud. In 1969, when Monsoon turned into a fan favorite, he dropped Berry as his manager.

Berry was inducted into the Wrestling Hall of Fame in Tulsa, Oklahoma in 1972. In 1996, Berry was inducted into the Wrestling Observer Newsletter Hall of Fame.

== Personal life ==
Berry dropped out of school at age 12 to work in a coal mine to support his family. He had two younger siblings.

Outside the ring, Berry was active in Pittsburg political circles. He was elected Parks Commissioner once. He also twice served as acting mayor. He also tried acting on at least one occasion, appearing in the 1953 film My Wife's Best Friend. He was also in the episode "Well Oiled" of The Abbott and Costello Show as "Wild" Red Berry, but is credited as Red Barry. In his later life, he was both an active Mason and Shriner.

A year and a half before he died, Berry suffered a stroke which inhibited his ability to speak. In 1973, he died of a heart attack. A species of Echinopsis, developed by Bob Schick, was named after Berry. In addition, a softball field in Pittsburg is named after Berry.

Berry also appeared on an episode of You Bet Your Life with Groucho Marx as a contestant where he and his partner won $1000.

== Championships and accomplishments ==
- Boxing
  - Kansas State Middleweight Champion
- Central States Wrestling
  - NWA Central States Heavyweight Championship (2 times)
- NWA Los Angeles
  - NWA "Beat the Champ" Television Championship (1 time)
  - NWA International Television Tag Team Championship (3 times) – with Bob Orton (2) and Tosh Togo (1)
  - NWA World Tag Team Championship (Los Angeles version) (1 time) – with Tosh Togo
- NWA Tri-State
  - NWA Arkansas Junior Heavyweight Championship (1 time)
- National Wrestling Association
  - NWA World Light Heavyweight Championship (2 times)
- Professional Wrestling Hall of Fame and Museum
  - Pioneer Era (class of 2010)
- Southwest Sports, Inc.
  - NWA Texas Heavyweight Championship (2 times)
- Wrestling Observer Newsletter
  - Wrestling Observer Newsletter Hall of Fame (Class of 1996)
