= Bill White (wrestler) =

American professional wrestler (1945–2021)

Personal information
- Born: February 27, 1945 Philadelphia, Pennsylvania, U.S
- Died: September 7, 2021 (aged 76)

Professional wrestling career
- Ring name(s): Bill White; Blue Demon; The Destroyer; The Scorpion
- Billed height: 6 ft 1 in (1.85 m)
- Billed weight: 250 lb (110 kg)
- Debut: 1964
- Retired: 1987

Bill White (February 27, 1945 – September 7, 2021) was an American professional wrestler, using the ring name "Wild" Bill White, from 1964 until his retirement in 1987.

== Professional wrestling career ==
In 1964, while assisting an amateur wrestling coach at a Catholic high school in Florida, in Tampa, he helped professional wrestler Eddie Graham put on a wrestling demonstration at a youth camp. After viewing a professional wrestling event, he tried out for the sport because he was told he might have potential. He then began wrestling in Nashville, Tennessee, under the tutelage of promoter Nick Gulas. He wrestled in Tennessee for approximately a year.

He then traveled to Southern California, where he worked for Roy Shire from 1965 to 1967. While in the territory, he wrestled Pat Patterson, Ray Stevens, and Mr. Fuji. White then began to wrestle for Vincent J. McMahon's World Wide Wrestling Federation where he faced opponents such as Johnny Rodz, Chief Jay Strongbow (Joe Scarpa), Jimmy Valiant, Victor Rivera and Don Muraco from 1971 to 1975.

White toured for both All Japan Pro Wrestling and New Japan Pro-Wrestling and had a successful run in World Class Championship Wrestling winning the Texas Tag Team title with El Gran Goliath on February 26, 1979, before moving on to the Eastern territories.

In 1981, White wrestled for Eddie Graham in Georgia Championship Wrestling. Here, he worked with "Bullet" Bob Armstrong and the following year, he began a stint in Jim Crockett Promotions, working alongside wrestling legends such as "Rowdy" Roddy Piper.

On June 10, 2006, White was inducted as an honoree into the Cauliflower Alley Club.

== Personal life ==
White was born on February 27, 1945, in Philadelphia. In high school, White participated in amateur wrestling, football, and baseball.

After retiring from wrestling in 1987, White began a career in private enterprise. He later settled in South Carolina, working as an insurance adjuster. In addition, he was a truck driver, certified scuba diver, and professional wrestling trainer. White died on September 7, 2021, at the age of 76.

== Championships and accomplishments ==
- Cauliflower Alley Club
  - Other inductee (2006)
- Gulf Coast Championship Wrestling
  - City of Mobile Heavyweight Championship (1 time)
- World Class Championship Wrestling
  - NWA Texas Tag Team Championship (1 time) with El Gran Goliath
