= They Went That-A-Way & That-A-Way =

- Directed by: Stuart E. McGowan; Edward Montagne
- Written by: Tim Conway
- Produced by: Lang Elliott
- Starring: Tim Conway; Chuck McCann; Richard Kiel; Dub Taylor; Reni Santoni; Lenny Montana; Sonny Shroyer; Ben L. Jones; Timothy Blake; Hank Worden
- Cinematography: Jacques Haitkin
- Edited by: Fabien D. Tordjmann
- Music by: Michael Leonard
- Production company: International Picture Show
- Distributed by: The International Picture Show Company
- Release date: December 1978
- Running time: 96 minutes
- Country: United States
- Language: English

They Went That-A-Way & That-A-Way is a 1978 slapstick comedy film co-directed by Stuart E. McGowan and Edward Montagne and written by and starring Tim Conway.

== Premise ==
Dewey and Wallace are small-town lawmen in Powder Springs, Georgia who are ordered by the governor of Georgia to go undercover as prison inmates to find out where a gang of thieves have hidden their loot. While they're undercover, however, the governor dies, and because no one else knows about the ruse Dewey and Wallace are stranded in prison.

== Home media ==
The film was released on DVD by MGM Home Entertainment on October 8, 2002, as part of a double feature with The Longshot, another Tim Conway movie.

The film was released on Blu-ray by Kino Lorber August 16, 2022.

== Notes ==
Richard Kiel, who stars in the film as the character "Duke," played an identical role in an episode of the 1980s TV series, "The Fall Guy," episode "That's Right, We're Bad."
