= Tanya (1976 film) =

- Directed by: Nate Rodgers (as P.D. Fingersnarl)
- Written by: Charles Townsend
- Distributed by: Boxoffice International Pictures
- Release date: 1976
- Country: United States
- Language: English

Tanya is a low-budget 1976 comedy film directed by Nate Rodgers and loosely based on the experiences of Patty Hearst. The lead character, Charlotte Kane, is 20-year-old heiress of a newspaper mogul. She is kidnapped by five sex-crazed pseudo-revolutionaries who call themselves "The Symphonic Liberation Army" (a parody of the Symbionese Liberation Army). Charlotte is quickly converted to their cause and changes her name to Tanya.
