= Rito Romero =

Mexican luchador (1927–2001)

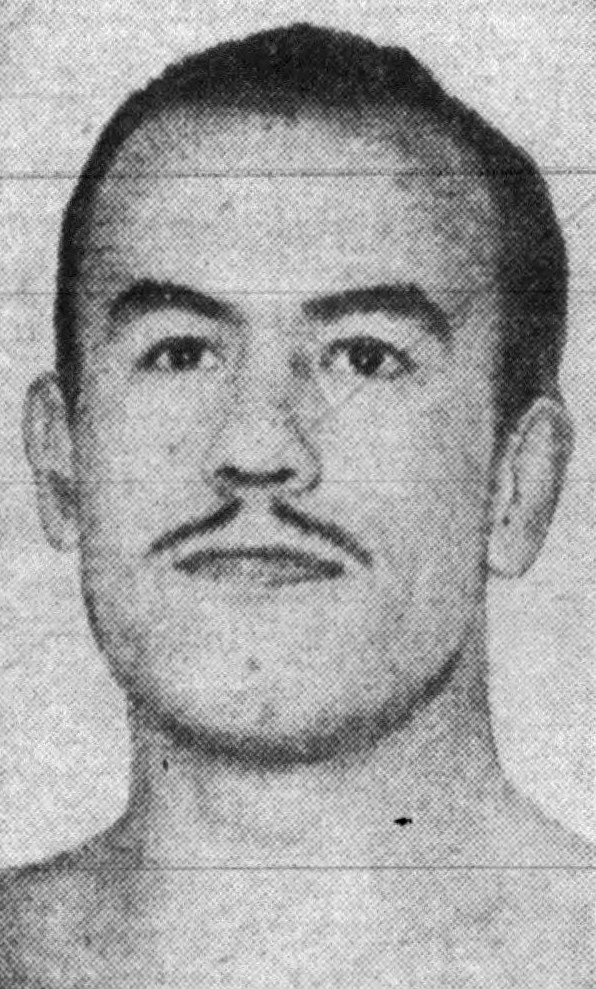
- Romero, circa 1953

Personal information
- Born: Rito Romero Loza; May 19, 1927 Acatic, Jalisco, Mexico
- Died: January 17, 2001 (aged 73) Guadalajara, Jalisco, Mexico

Professional wrestling career
- Ring name(s): Rito Romero; Rayo Mexicano
- Trained by: Diablo Velasco
- Debut: 1942
- Retired: 1960

Rito Romero Loza (May 19, 1927 – January 18, 2001) was a Mexican professional wrestler. He wrestled in Mexico and in the NWA territories of Texas and Los Angeles. He appeared in several films in his native country along with a number of other professional wrestlers. He is remembered for his innovation of the Romero Special/La Tapatia submission manoeuver, commonly known as the Surfboard.

== Career ==
Romero was trained as a professional wrestler by Diablo Velasco, a man also responsible for the training of Mil Máscaras and Gory Guerrero. His early career was spent in Mexico, making his debut in Guadalajara at aged just 15, having been in training for the previous 3 years.

He began finding title success upon becoming a regular in NWA Texas (which would become World Class Championship Wrestling. With tag-team partner Black Guzmán (brother of El Santo) he would win the NWA Texas Tag Team titles 3 times, winning the same belts a further 5 times with different partners including Pepper Gomez. He would also co-hold the NWA World Tag Team Championship (Texas version) twice (the belts being recognised as World Championships by WCCW and Dory Funk's Amarillo territory). As a singles competitor he had the distinction of being the inaugural NWA Pacific Coast Heavyweight Champion of the Los Angeles territory in 1953 as well as being a two-time NWA Texas Jr. Heavyweight Title back in the region in which he remained a perennial star. He became NWA Texas Heavyweight Champion twice, on the second occasion winning the title from Verne Gagne on 27 October 1950. In between his first title reign in 1949 and his retirement there was only one year (1960) during which Rito Romero did not enjoy at least some time with a championship.

During his career he became friends with the legendary Lou Thesz (against whom he had his biggest match for the NWA World Heavyweight Championship at a time when he was NWA Texas Heavyweight Champion) and travelled Europe with him. Thesz esteemed Romero so highly as to rate him as a better performer than his contemporaries El Canek and Gory Guerrero.

== Personal life ==
Romero was married to Yolanda and had 4 children. His brother Juventino Romero (1923–2009, also known as Cocoliso Romero and La Orquídea) was also a wrestler.

== Death ==
Rito Romero suffered a fatal heart attack on January 17, 2001. He had gone into hospital in his hometown of Guadalajara on the 16th with high blood-sugar levels where it was discovered he was suffering from appendicitis. Bored of being in hospital he decided to check himself. While remonstrating with the hospital workers who were trying to make him return to his bed he collapsed.

== Championships and accomplishments ==
- NWA Los Angeles
  - NWA World Junior Heavyweight Championship (Los Angeles version) (1 time)
  - NWA International Television Championship (3 times)
  - NWA International Television Tag Team Championship (3 times) - with Chief War Cloud (1) Ray Stern (1 time) and Suni War Cloud (1 time)
  - NWA Pacific Coast Heavyweight Championship (Los Angeles version) (1 time)
- Southwest Sports, Inc.
  - NWA Brass Knuckles Championship (Texas version) (1 time)
  - NWA Texas Heavyweight Championship (4 times)
  - NWA Texas Junior Heavyweight Championship (2 times)
  - NWA Texas Tag Team Championship (7 times) – with Miguel "Black" Guzmán (3 times), Sugi Sito (1 time), George Drake (1 time), Pepe Mendietta (1 time), and Pepper Gomez (1 time)
  - NWA World Tag Team Championship (2 times) – with Dory Dixon (1 time) and Pepper Gomez (1 time)

== Filmography ==
- La Bestia magnifica (1953)
- La Última lucha (1959)
- El Señor Tormenta (1963)
- Atacan las brujas (1968)
