= Dory Dixon =

Jamaican retired professional wrestler

Personal information
- Born: Dorrel Dixon; February 1, 1934 (age 92) British Jamaica, British Empire

Professional wrestling career
- Ring name(s): Calypso Kid; Dorrel Dixon; Dory Dixon
- Billed height: 1.75 m (5 ft 9 in)
- Billed weight: 95 kg (209 lb)
- Trained by: Rafael Salamanca
- Debut: 1953
- Retired: 1987

Dorrel "Dory" Dixon (born February 1, 1934) is a Jamaican-Mexican retired professional wrestler. He worked for the majority of his career in Mexico, where he eventually became a Mexican citizen. He is currently a pastor for the Seventh-day Adventist Church, preaching about religion and physical health all over Mexico.

== Biography ==
In the early 1950s Dorrel Dixon was a competitive weightlifter in his native Jamaica, winning the "Mr. Jamaica Body Beautiful" tournament. He was selected to be a part of the Jamaican weightlifting team for the 1954 Central American and Caribbean Games held in Mexico City, Mexico. While Dixon did not speak any Spanish he became so enamored with Mexico that he decided to stay behind when the rest of the Jamaican team returned home. Dixon hid with some Mexicans at first since he did not have the proper paperwork, however, once he met the son of Rafael Avila Camacho, the Governor of Puebla, he began working for the governor and eventually had his paperwork sorted out.

=== Professional wrestling career (1953–1987) ===
Dixon was originally not a fan of professional wrestling, he was working as a Physical Education Teacher when he met Salvador Lutteroth, Mexico's premier professional wrestling promoter. Lutteroth was so impressed with Dixon's physical appearance and personality that he convinced him to give wrestling a try. After training under Rafael Salamanca, Dixon made his professional wrestling debut in 1955 for Lutteroth's Empresa Mexicana de Lucha Libre (EMLL). In 1958 the National Wrestling Alliance (NWA) granted Salvador Lutteroth the booking rights to the NWA World Light Heavyweight Championship at their annual NWA Conference. Dixon was Lutteroth's choice as champion, defeating Al Kashley for the title on February 13, 1958. For more than a year Dixon held the title, defending it in main events of shows all over Mexico before losing the belt to Ray Mendoza on September 11, 1959.

In 1961 Dixon began working in the United States, some times billed as "the Calypso Kid", but mainly he worked as Dory Dixon. He would team with Bobo Brazil to form one of the first successful all African American tag teams of that era. He would also wrestle WWWF World Heavyweight Champion Buddy Rogers in Madison Square Garden in New York City. He mainly worked for NWA Texas (Later renamed "World Class Championship Wrestling") where he won the NWA Texas Heavyweight Championship in 1961 defeating Waldo Von Erich. He also teamed with Pepper Gomez to win the NWA Texas Tag Team Championship twice, a title he would later win with Nick Kozak after it had been renamed the WCCW Texas Tag Team Championship. In 1969, went to Japan to work for International Wrestling Association of Japan (IWA Japan). Later that year he went to Australia to work in World Championship Wrestling (Australia).

He would return to Japan in 1974 working New Japan Pro-Wrestling. In 1975 Dory Dixon was one of many wrestlers to leave EMLL and follow Francisco Flores, Ray Mendoza and Benjamín Mora when they created Universal Wrestling Association (UWA). Dixon appeared on UWA's debut card and was one of the "name draws" in the mid to late 1970s. Later that year he went to Vancouver to work for NWA All-Star Wrestling. He even wrestled Lou Thez in the main event of a UWA show in Pachuca, Hidalgo. By the early 1980s Dixon worked more as a special attractions type of wrestler, due to his long history in pro wrestling, and finally retired in 1987.

=== Private life ===
Dixon before leaving Jamaica to Mexico in 1954, had a daughter he named Grace Angella born to his first love Babs Evans Shirley. He is the son of Rafael Dixon and Eunice Dixon-Spencer. Younger brother to sister, Nesta and Lloyd. Dixon was married to Ana Ayala and together they have five children, Dorrel, Eunice, Al, Lloyd and Kenneth. After that marriage was broken; Dorrel married with Virginia Soto who had three children, Althea, Dizzy and Ingmar. Now Dixon is active in the Seventh-day Adventist church, with Dory Dixon being a pastor in the church. He still keeps in shape and preaches a mixture of "healthy mind" and "healthy body" to underprivileged kids and teenagers all over Mexico.

== Championships and accomplishments ==
- Empresa Mexicana de Lucha Libre
  - NWA World Light Heavyweight Championship (1 time)
- NWA Hollywood
  - NWA Americas Tag Team Championship (2 times) – with Earl Maynard (1) and Raul Mata (1)
  - NWA "Beat the Champ" Television Championship (1 time)
- NWA Texas
  - NWA Texas Heavyweight Championship (2 times)
  - NWA World Tag Team Championship (Texas version) (1 time) – with Rito Romero
  - NWA Texas Tag Team Championship (2 times) – with Pepper Gomez
- World Class Championship Wrestling
  - WCCW Texas Tag Team Championship (1 time) – with Nick Kozak
- World Wide Wrestling Association
  - WWWA World Heavyweight Championship (1 time)
- Other titles
  - World Negro Heavyweight Championship (1 time)
- Wrestling Observer Newsletter
  - Wrestling Observer Newsletter Hall of Fame (2025)

== Luchas de Apuestas ==
Winner (wager)	Loser (wager)	Location	Event	Date	Notes
El Canek (mask)	Dorrel Dixon (hair)	N/A	Live event	N/A	
Fishman (mask)	Dorrel Dixon (hair)	N/A	Live event	N/A	
Espanto I (mask)	Dorrel Dixon (hair)	Mexico City	Live event	March 20, 1964	
Dorrel Dixon (hair)	Black Shadow (hair)	Mexico City	Live event	1968	
Black Shadow (hair)	Dorrel Dixon (hair)	Mexico City	Live event	June 11, 1968	
Ángel Blanco (hair)	Dorrel Dixon (hair)	Mexico City	Live event	July 26, 1981	
Carlos Plata (hair)	Dorrel Dixon (hair)	Xalapa, Veracruz	Live event	January 20, 1983	
