= Pepper Gomez =

American professional wrestler

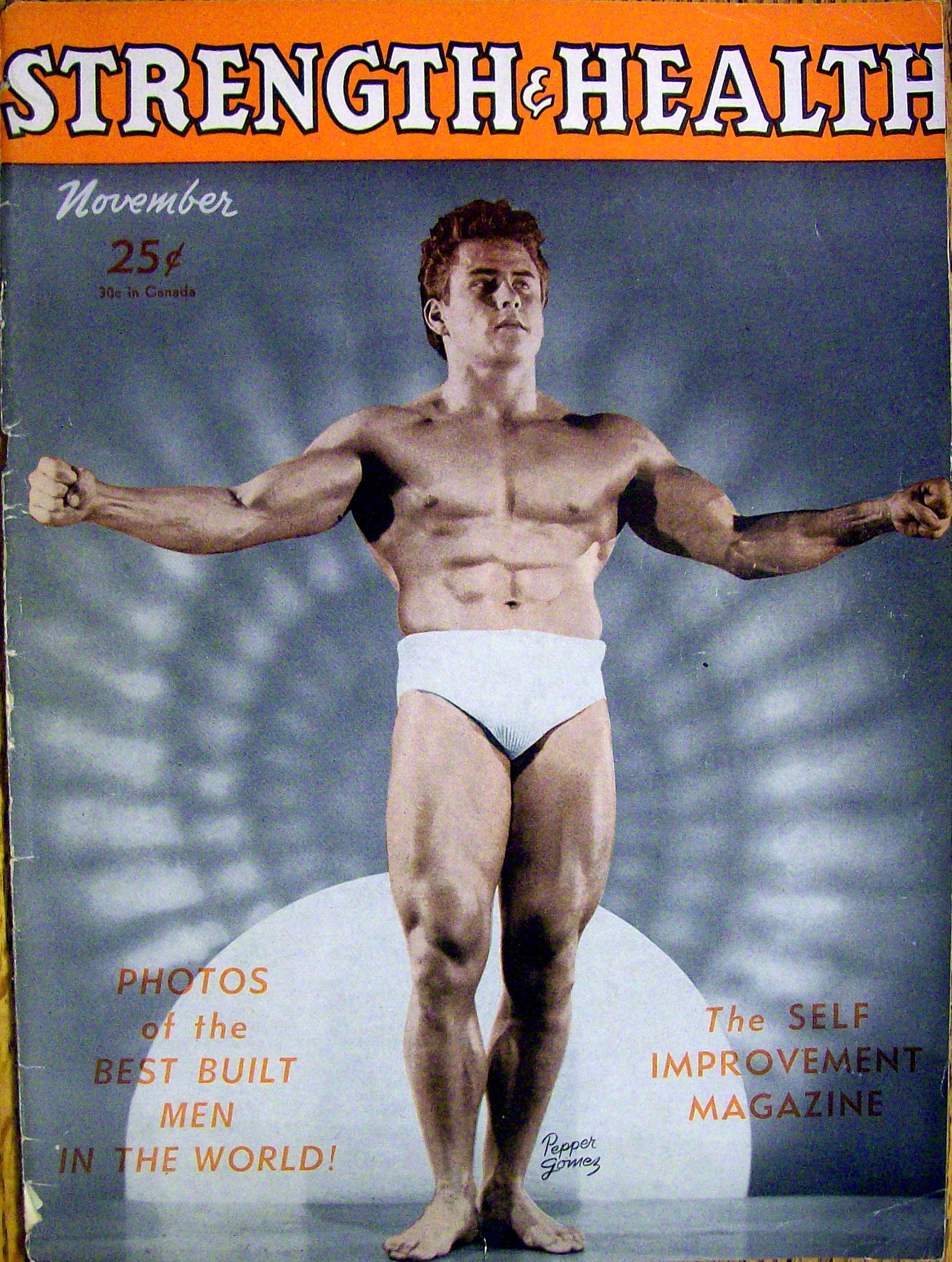
- Gomez on the cover of Strength & Health magazine in 1948.

Personal information
- Born: José Serapio Palimino Gomez; April 21, 1927 Los Angeles, California, U.S.
- Died: May 6, 2004 (aged 77) San Francisco, California, U.S.
- Cause of death: Gastritis
- Education: Los Angeles City College
- Spouse: Bonnie Gomez
- Children: 5

Professional wrestling career
- Ring name: Pepper Gomez
- Billed height: 5 ft 9 in (175 cm)
- Billed weight: 220 lb (100 kg)
- Trained by: Black Guzmán
- Debut: January 1953
- Retired: 1982

José Serapio "Joseph" Palimino Gomez (April 21, 1927 – May 6, 2004) was an American professional wrestler and bodybuilder, better known by his ring name, Pepper Gomez. Known for his exceptional abdominal muscles, he would allow rivals to perform stunts such as jumping onto his stomach from the top of a ladder or driving a Volkswagen Beetle over his stomach, earning him the nickname "The Man with the Cast Iron Stomach". He wrestled as a blue-collar Latino babyface.

== Early life ==
Gomez was born in Los Angeles, California in 1927. While at high school, he competed at football, gymnastics and track. He attended Los Angeles City College, where he played football as a fullback.

== Bodybuilding career ==
In 1947, Gomez began participating in bodybuilding. His training partners included Armand Tanny and Joe Gold. He took part in a series of bodybuilding competitions over the next five years, winning the "Mr. Muscle Beach" contest in Santa Monica, California in 1950. In 1951, he placed fifth in the AAU Mr. America contest. Gomez was featured in the November 1948 issue of Strength & Health and the January 1952 issue of Muscle Power.

== Professional wrestling career ==
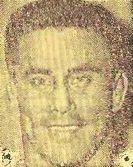
Photo of Gomez from a 1960 wrestling program.

Gomez was trained to wrestle by Black Guzmán. He debuted in January 1953 in El Paso, Texas. Early in his career, he toured British Columbia with the Vancouver-based Big Time Wrestling promotion, winning the Northwest Tag Team Championship three times in 1953.

In the mid-1950s, Gomez joined the Dallas, Texas-based promotion Big Time Wrestling, winning the NWA Texas Heavyweight Championship 15 times between 1955 and 1971. Gomez also held the NWA Texas Tag Team Championship on ten occasions between 1955 and 1961 and the Texas-version of the NWA World Tag Team Championship five times between 1958 and 1961.

In the early-1960s, Gomez began competing for the San Francisco, California-based American Wrestling Alliance (later renamed Big Time Wrestling). In 1962, Gomez embarked on a heated feud with Ray Stevens. After Stevens convinced Gomez to allow him to jump off a ladder onto Gomez' stomach, Stevens instead delivered his signature "Bombs Away" diving knee drop to Gomez' throat, leaving him coughing up blood. Gomez and Stevens went on to wrestle in a series of matches that sold-out the Cow Palace and the Oakland-Alameda County Coliseum Arena. Gomez won the vacant AWA United States Heavyweight Championship in July 1962, losing the championship to Stevens in February 1963. Gomez also held the AWA World Tag Team Championship on three occasions between 1963 and 1968 and the San Francisco version of the NWA World Tag Team Championship on seven occasions between 1963 and 1977.

In the late-1960s, Gomez began competing for the Minneapolis, Minnesota-based American Wrestling Association. He began a heated feud with Killer Kowalski after Kowalski delivered a knee drop to his throat in an echo of the Ray Stevens angle. The feud saw Kowalski unable to apply his signature stomach claw to Gomez' muscular stomach.

In the mid-1970s, Gomez joined the Indianapolis, Indiana-based World Wrestling Association. In November 1975, he defeated Ox Baker for the WWA World Heavyweight Championship. He held the championship until May 1976, when he was defeated by The Masked Strangler. Gomez also won the WWA World Tag Team Championship with Wilbur Snyder in 1974 and 1978.

Gomez retired in 1982. He went on to work as a maître d' in a restaurant in Fisherman's Wharf, San Francisco.

== Personal life ==
Gomez was of Mexican descent. He had five children. At the time of his death, he was married to Bonnie.

== Death ==
Gomez underwent surgery in April 2004 and was placed on life support. He died of gastritis on May 6, 2004.

== In popular culture ==
A minor character in the 2008 video game Fallout 3 is named after Gomez.

== Championships and accomplishments ==
=== Bodybuilding ===
- Amateur Athletic Union
  - "Junior Mr. America" (8th, 1952)
  - "Mr. America" (5th, 1951)
  - "Mr. California" (2nd (Tall), 1947; 5th, 1952)
  - "Mr. Los Angeles" (2nd, 1947; 3rd, 1949; 3rd, 1950; 2nd; 1951; 3rd, 1952)
  - "Mr. Pacific Coast" (4th; 1948)
  - "Mr. Western America" (3rd, 1947)
- Miscellaneous
  - "Mr. Muscle Beach" (winner, 1950)

=== Professional wrestling ===
- Big Time Wrestling (Boston)
  - BTW New England Heavyweight Championship (1 time)
- American Wrestling Alliance / Big Time Wrestling (San Francisco)
  - AWA United States Heavyweight Championship (1 time)
  - AWA World Tag Team Championship (3 times) – with José Lothario (1 time) and Pedro Morales (2 times)
  - NWA World Tag Team Championship (San Francisco version) (7 times) – with Pedro Morales (2 times), Jose Lothario (1 time), Al Madril (1 time), Pat Patterson (1 time), Peter Maivia (1 time), and Rocky Johnson (1 time)
- Big Time Wrestling (British Columbia)
  - Northwest Tag Team Championship (3 times) – with Johnny Demchuck (2 times) and Ivan Kameroff (1 time)
- Big Time Wrestling (Texas)
  - NWA Texas Heavyweight Championship (15 times)
  - NWA Texas Tag Team Championship (10 times) – with Bill Melby (1 time), Cyclone Anaya (1 time), Dory Dixon (2 times), Hogan Wharton (1 time), Larry Chene (1 time), Luigi Macera (1 time), El Medico (2 times), and Rito Romero (2 times)
  - NWA World Tag Team Championship (Texas version) (5 times) – with El Medico (1 time), Rito Romero (1 time), Ciclone Anaya (1 time), Torbellino Blanco/Wilbur Snyder (1 time), and Dory Dixon (1 time)
- Cauliflower Alley Club
  - Other honoree (1992)
- Championship Wrestling from Florida
  - NWA Southern Heavyweight Championship (Florida version) (1 time)
- NWA Hollywood Wrestling
  - NWA Americas Tag Team Championship (1 time) – with Black Gordman
- Western States Sports
  - NWA World Tag Team Championship (Amarillo version) (1 time) - with Jose Lothario
- Pacific Northwest Wrestling
  - NWA Pacific Northwest Tag Team Championship (1 time) – with Herb Freeman
- World Wrestling Association
  - WWA World Heavyweight Championship (1 time)
  - WWA World Tag Team Championship (2 times) – with Wilbur Snyder
- Other Titles
  - Fort Myers Heavyweight Championship ( time )
