= Cyclone Anaya =

Mexican professional wrestler (1917–1999)

Personal information
- Born: Jesús Becerra Valencia; August 1, 1917 Venezuela
- Died: January 4, 1999 (aged 81) Houston, Texas, U.S.

Professional wrestling career
- Ring name(s): Cyclone Anaya; Cyclone Ayala; Apollo Anaya; Juan Hernandez
- Billed height: 5 ft 11 in (1.80 m)
- Billed weight: 209 lb (95 kg)
- Debut: 1943
- Retired: 1960

Jesús Becerra Valencia (August 1, 1917 – January 4, 1999) was a Venezuelan-Mexican professional wrestler who was best known as Cyclone Anaya in Texas.

== Professional wrestling career ==
Anaya made his professional wrestling debut in Mexico in 1943. In 1952, Anaya won his first title the NWA Texas Heavyweight Championship defeating Duke Keomuka. Later on, he became a three-time NWA Southern Junior Heavyweight Champion.

In 1960, Anaya retired from wrestling due to an injury.

== Personal life ==
After retiring from wrestling, Anaya founded a chain of restaurants in 1966 in Houston called Cyclone Anaya's Tex-Mex Kitchen which serves Mexican food. The restaurant franchise still exists.

Anaya died on January 4, 1999, at 81.

== Championships and accomplishments ==
- NWA Mid-America
  - NWA Southern Junior Heavyweight Championship (3 times)
- NWA San Francisco
  - NWA World Tag Team Championship (San Francisco version) (2 times)
- Southwest Sports, Inc.
  - NWA Texas Heavyweight Championship (2 times)
  - NWA Texas Tag Team Championship (2 times) – with Pepper Gomez (1 time) and Gory Guerrero (1 time)
- Western States Sports
  - NWA Southwest Tag Team Championship (1 time) - with Tommy Martindale (1)
  - NWA North American Tag Team Championship (Amarillo version) (7 times) – with Ricky Romero (1)
  - NWA Rocky Mountain Heavyweight Championship (1 time)
