= NWA Southwest Texas Tag Team Championship =

Professional wrestling tag team championship

Details
- Promotion: NWA Southwest
- Date established: July 20, 1998
- Date retired: September 2011
Statistics
- First champions: Gen-X-Crew (Zane Morris and Ian St. James)

The NWA Southwest Texas Tag Team Championship was the secondary tag team championship in NWA Southwest.

== Title history ==
Key
No.	Overall reign number
Reign	Reign number for the specific team—reign numbers for the individuals are in parentheses, if different
Days	Number of days held

No.	Champion	Championship change			Reign statistics		Notes	Ref.
No.	Champion	Date	Event	Location	Reign	Days	Notes	Ref.
1	Gen-X-Crew (Zane Morris and Ian St. James)	July 20, 1998	N/A	N. Richland Hills, Texas	1			
2	Team Extreme (Khris Germany and Kit Carson)	August 7, 1998	N/A	N. Richland Hills, Texas	1			
—	Vacated	February 26, 1999	—	—	—	—	After the champions no-show a title defense	
3	Moody's Mob (Bull Schmitt and New Dr. X)	March 14, 1999	N/A	N. Richland Hills, Texas	1			
4	Team Extreme	June 4, 1999	N/A	N. Richland Hills, Texas	2			
—	Vacated	September 25, 1999	—	—	—	—	Won the NWA World Tag Team Championship	
5	Canyon and Bull Schmidt	October 1, 1999	N/A	N. Richland Hills, Texas	1			
6	Sterling Studs (Mike Fox and Trent Atkins)	November 5, 1999	N/A	N. Richland Hills, Texas	1			
7	The Rebellion (Kurt Reigns and Tejas)	January 1, 2000	N/A	N. Richland Hills, Texas	1			
8	Naughty by Nature (Rude and Tully)	March 24, 2000	N/A	N. Richland Hills, Texas	1			
9	The Rebellion (Kurt Reigns and Tejas)	April 7, 2000	N/A	Dynersburg, Tennessee	2			
10	Salt and Pepper (Jimmy James and Action Jackson)	July 17, 2000	N/A	N. Richland Hills, Texas	1			
11	The Blackbird Posse (Larry Green and Chris Young)	November 17, 2000	N/A	N. Richland Hills, Texas	1			
12	Hell's Crew (Gravedigger and The Dark Angel)	December 12, 2000	N/A	N. Richland Hills, Texas	1			
13	Black Attack (Al Jackson and Mike Anthony)	January 19, 2001	N/A	N. Richland Hills, Texas	1			
14	The Blackbird Posse (Larry Green and Chris Young)	March 16, 2001	N/A	N. Richland Hills, Texas	2			
15	Black Attack (Al Jackson and Mike Anthony)	April 13, 2001	N/A	N. Richland Hills, Texas	2			
16	J.P. Black and Mike Thunder	September 7, 2001	N/A	N. Richland Hills, Texas	1			
17	Black Attack (Al Jackson and Mike Anthony)	September 30, 2001	N/A	San Antonio, Texas	3			
18	J.P. Black and Mike Thunder	February 8, 2002	N/A	N. Richland Hills, Texas	2			
171	The Blackbird Posse (Larry Green and Chris Young)	February 22, 2002	N/A	N. Richland Hills, Texas	3			
19	Justin 2 Fine and B.J. Turner	June 21, 2002	N/A	N. Richland Hills, Texas	1			
—	Vacated	June 11, 2003	—	—	—	—	After the team failed to defend the championship	
20	Texas Trailer Trash (Harley Johnson and Hugh Rogue)	June 28, 2003	N/A	Ft. Worth, Texas	1			
21	Hallomass (Joey Corman and Samir)	November 22, 2003	N/A	Tyler, Texas	1			
—	Vacated	May 10, 2004	—	—	—	—	Team broke up to focus on singles competition	
22	Texas Trailer Trash (Harley Johnson and Bobby 2 Badd)	June 19, 2004	N/A	Dallas, Texas	1			
—	Vacated	January 2006	—	—	—	—	Team broke up	
23	The Re-Gex (Mace and Seth Shai)	January 28, 2006	N/A	Ft. Worth, Texas	1			
24	Chaz Taylor and Fast Eddie	May 12, 2006	N/A	Houston, Texas	1			
25	The Crusaders (Pop'N and Loc)	August 25, 2006	N/A	Houston, Texas	1			
26	The Blacktinos (D.J. King and Galan Ramirez)	February 9, 2007	N/A	Cypress, Texas	1			
27	Chaz Taylor and Mr. Destiny	October 12, 2007	N/A	Cypress, Texas	1			
28	The Blacktinos (D.J. King and Galan Ramirez)	June 13, 2008	N/A	Houston, Texas	2			
29	Texas Regulators (Crash and Widowmaker)	July 19, 2008	N/A	Dallas, Texas	1			
30	High Society (Prince Al Farat and Thomas Trump)	October 11, 2008	N/A	Dallas, Texas	1			
31	Team Texas (Chaz Taylor and Austin Rhodes)	March 21, 2009	N/A	Livingston, Texas	1			
32	The Canadian Sex Pistols (Shawn Mills and Cody Jones)	August 30, 2009	N/A	Amarillo, Texas	1			
33	The Texas Hearthrobs (Shawn Sanders and Bryce Payne)	April 10, 2010	N/A	Amarillo, Texas	1			
34	Pretty Flawless (Jerome Daniels and Nobe Bryant)	June 1, 2010	N/A	Whitesboro, Texas	1			
35	Impeccable (Ken Carson and Joey Figueroa)	November 12, 2010	N/A	Cypress, Texas	1			
36	Gulf Coast Connection (Ben Galvan and Rudy Russo)	January 7, 2011	N/A	Robstown, Texas	1			
37	Impeccable (Ken Carson and Joey Figueroa)	February 11, 2011	N/A	Cypress, Texas	2			

== See also ==
- List of National Wrestling Alliance championships
