= Miguel Guzmán (footballer) =

Mexican footballer (born 1996)

Personal information
- Full name: Miguel Guzmán Miranda
- Date of birth: 8 April 1996 (age 30)
- Place of birth: Guadalajara, Jalisco, Mexico
- Height: 1.78 m (5 ft 10 in)
- Position: Winger

Youth career
- 2010: Atotonilco F.C.
- 2011: Veracruz
- 2013–2014: Querétaro
- 2014–2015: Tijuana
- 2015: Cachorros UdeG

Senior career*
Years	Team	Apps	(Gls)
2015	UdeG	0	(0)
2016	Atlético San Luis	1	(0)
2016–2017	→ Tepatitlán (loan)	33	(6)
2017–2019	U. de C.	69	(14)
2020	Tampico Madero	3	(0)
2020	Halcones de Zapopan	0	(0)
2021–2022	UdeG	43	(3)
- * Club domestic league appearances and goals as of 3 May 2022

Miguel Guzmán Miranda (born 8 April 1996) is a Mexican professional footballer who plays as a winger.

== Personal life ==
Guzmán is the son of former Mexican football player Daniel Guzmán.
