= Ray Gunkel =

American professional wrestler, promoter (1924–1972)

Personal information
- Born: Raymond Fred Gunkel; February 16, 1924 Chicago, Illinois, U.S.
- Died: August 1, 1972 (aged 48) Savannah, Georgia, U.S.

Professional wrestling career
- Ring name: Ray Gunkel
- Billed height: 6 ft 3 in (191 cm)
- Billed weight: 260 lb (118 kg)
- Trained by: Billy Thom
- Debut: 1948

Raymond Fred Gunkel (February 16, 1924 – August 1, 1972) was an American amateur and professional wrestler and promoter in the state of Georgia. Gunkel was a two-time AAU national champion and, as a professional, a three-time NWA Texas Heavyweight Champion. He died of heart trauma after a match in Savannah, Georgia, in which he defeated Ox Baker.

== Amateur wrestling career ==
Gunkel was born on February 16, 1924, in Chicago, Illinois. He attended Kelvyn Park High School before attending Purdue University. He competed on the university's wrestling and football teams. As an All-American wrestler, he was undefeated in his junior and senior years and helped his team win the Big Ten Conference twice. As an individual, he finished second in the NCAA final to Dick Hutton. He also won the Amateur Athletic Union national championship in both 1947 and 1948.

== Professional wrestling career ==
=== Texas ===
Gunkel originally wanted to become a teacher, but he entered professional wrestling immediately after leaving university. He made his debut in Indianapolis, Indiana, in 1948. He then moved to Texas, where he competed for throughout the early 1950s. On September 4, 1951, he defeated Duke Keomuka to win the NWA Texas Heavyweight Championship. After dropping the title belt to Miguel Guzmán, he later regained it by defeating Keomuka again. His third and final Texas Heavyweight Championship came in 1953, when he defeated Mr. Moto to win the vacant championship. He was also successful as a tag team wrestler, as he won the NWA Texas Tag Team Championship seven times with six different partners. While wrestling in Texas, Gunkel was managed by professional boxer Jack Dempsey.

=== Georgia ===
After Gunkel and his last partner, Amazing Zuma, dropped the tag team title in Texas, Gunkel left the promotion. He moved to Georgia, where he competed for the remainder of his career and won two dozen championships. His first title belt in Georgia came when he teamed with Don McIntyre to win the Georgia version of the NWA International Tag Team Championship.

== Death ==
On August 1, 1972, Gunkel wrestled Ox Baker in Savannah, Georgia. During the match, Baker punched Gunkel in the chest. Gunkel won the match, but he died later that day of heart problems. An autopsy showed that Gunkel suffered from undiagnosed arteriosclerosis, but that his death was a result of heart trauma. It was determined that Baker's punch created a hematoma, which led to a blood clot that caused his death when it reached his heart. Gunkel was buried in Arlington Memorial Park in Sandy Springs, Georgia.

Following his death, Gunkel's wife Ann announced her intention to take his place in the ABC Booking wrestling organization. Gunkel's partners objected and closed the promotion. They immediately opened a new promotion that excluded Ann Gunkel. Ann Gunkel formed the All-South Wrestling Alliance, which operated until November 1974, when she was forced to sell the company because of declining business.

Ray Gunkel was posthumously inducted into the George Tragos/Lou Thesz Hall of Fame in 2008. His daughter Pam accepted the award on his behalf.

== Championships and accomplishments ==
- Championship Wrestling from Florida
  - NWA United States Tag Team Championship (Florida version) (1 time) – with “Cowboy” Bob Ellis
- Dallas Wrestling Club / Southwest Sports, Inc.
  - NWA Texas Heavyweight Championship (3 times)
  - NWA Texas Tag Team Championship (7 times) – with Miguel Guzman (1), Ricki Starr (2), Wilbur Snyder (1), Prince Maiava (1), Herb Freeman (1), and Amazing Zuma (1)
- George Tragos/Lou Thesz Professional Wrestling Hall of Fame
  - Class of 2008
- Mid-South Sports
  - NWA Georgia Heavyweight Championship (1 time)
  - NWA Georgia Tag Team Championship (5 times) - with Buddy Fuller (4) and El Mongol
  - NWA Georgia Television Championship (1 time)
  - NWA International Tag Team Championship (Georgia version) (7 times) – with Don McIntyre (2), Billy Red Lyons, Ron Etchison, Nick Roberts, Dick Gunkel and Dick Steinborn
  - NWA Southern Heavyweight Championship (Georgia version) (7 times)
  - NWA Southern Tag Team Championship (Georgia version) (1 time) – with Don McIntyre

== See also ==
- List of premature professional wrestling deaths
