= NWA World Tag Team Championship (Texas version) =

Professional wrestling tag team championship

Details
- Promotion: NWA Southwest Sports; World Class Championship Wrestling
- Date established: July 1957
- Date retired: 1982
Statistics
- First champions: Verne Gagne and Wilbur Snyder
- Final champions: Kerry Von Erich and Al Madril
- Most reigns: Jack and Jim Dalton/The Von Brauners (Kurt and Karl Von Brauner) (3 reigns); Individual: Pepper Gomez (6 reigns)

The Texas version (or East Texas version) of the NWA World Tag Team Championship was the main tag team professional wrestling championship in the Dallas/Houston-based Southwest Sports territory of the National Wrestling Alliance. While the name indicates that it was defended worldwide, this version of the NWA World Tag Team Championship was mainly defended in the eastern part of Texas. The championship was created in 1957 and actively promoted by Southwest Sports until 1968, when it was abandoned. The championship was later brought back by the Dallas-based World Class Championship Wrestling (WCCW) promotion in 1981, and was used until 1982 when WCCW decided to use the NWA American Tag Team Championship as their top tag team championship. As it is a professional wrestling championship, it is won not by actual competition, but by a scripted ending to a match.

The NWA Board of Directors allowed any member of the NWA to create a version of the NWA World Tag Team Championship, which led to as many as 13 identically named championships active in 1957.^{[Championships]} From 1959 until 1969 there was a second NWA World Tag Team Championship promoted in Texas, referred to as the Amarillo version or the West Texas version; this was later replaced with the NWA Western States Tag Team Championship.

The first championship team was that of Verne Gagne and Wilbur Snyder, who were awarded the championship in July 1958 by Southwest Sports. The last recorded champions of the Southwest Sports era were Mr. Ito and Chati Yokochi, who won the championship on December 12, 1968, with the championship being abandoned in 1969 or 1970. When the championship was reintroduced in 1981, promoter Fritz Von Erich brought in the team of Hercules Ayala and Ali Mustafa, billing them as champions from a different region to give the championship an air of legitimacy. The last champions were Fritz's son Kerry Von Erich and Al Madril, who won the championship in April 1981. The longest-reigning championship team was Pepper Gomez and Rocky Romero, whose reign in the Southwest Sports era lasted between 274 and 303 days. Due to vague records of the time, the exact number of days that various championship reigns lasted is impossible to determine, as is which team held the championship for the shortest amount of time. The Von Brauners (Kurt and Karl Von Brauner) hold the record for most reigns as a team, a total of four, while Pepper Gomez and Duke Keomuka both held the championship six times with different partners.

== Title history ==
Key

Symbol	Meaning
No.	The overall championship reign
Reign	The reign number for the specific wrestler listed.
Event	The event promoted by the respective promotion in which the title changed hands
N/A	The specific information is not known
—	Used for vacated reigns so as not to count it as an official reign
[Note]	Indicates that the exact length of the title reign is unknown, with a note providing more details

No.	Champions	Reign	Date	Days held	Location	Event	Notes	Ref(s)
1	Verne Gagne and Wilbur Snyder	1	July 1958	(Note: The exact date on which Gagne an Snyder won and lost the title is unknown, which means the title reign lasted between 1 day and 60 days.)	N/A	N/A	Awarded	
2	Bill Longson and Ike Eakins	1	August 1958	(Note: The exact date on which Longson and Eakins won the title is unknown, which means the title reign lasted between 1 day and 21 days.)	Texas	House show		
3	Pepper Gomez and El Medico	1	August 22, 1958	87	Houston, Texas	House show		
4	The Fabulous Kangaroos (Al Costello and Roy Heffernan)	1	November 17, 1958	14	Ft. Worth, Texas	House show		
5	Pepper Gomez (2) and Rito Romero	1	December 1, 1958	(Note: The exact date on which Gomez and Romer lost the title is unknown, which means the title reign lasted between 274 and 303 days.)	Ft. Worth, Texas	House show		
6	Duke Keomuka and Mr. Moto	1	September 1959	(Note: The exact date on which Keomuka and Mr. Moto lost the title is unknown, which means the title reign lasted between 69 and 98 days.)	Texas	House show		
7	Pepper Gomez (3) and Ciclone Anaya	1	December 8, 1959	52	Dallas, Texas	House show		
8	Joe Christie and Man Mountain Managoff	1	January 29, 1960	14	Houston, Texas	House show		
9	Hogan Wharton and Adnon Kaisy	1	February 12, 1960	49	Houston, Texas	House show		
10	Danny McShain and Joe Christie (2)	1	April 1, 1960	(Note: The exact date on which McShain and Christie lost the title is unknown, which means the title reign lasted between 30 and 60 days.)	Houston, Texas	House show		
11	Pepper Gomez (4) and Torbellino Blanco	1	May 1960	(Note: The exact date on which Blanco gave Snyder the title is unknown, which means the title reign lasted between 93 and 152 days.)	Texas	House show		
12	Pepper Gomez (5) and Wilbur Snyder	1	September 1960	(Note: The exact date on which Gomez and Snyder won the title is unknown, which means the title reign lasted between 217 and 246 days.)	N/A	N/A	Blanco gave his half to Snyder	
13	Rito Romero (2) and Dory Dixon	1	May 5, 1961	21	Houston, Texas	House show		
14	Duke Keomuka (2) and Tony Martin	1	May 26, 1961	21	Houston, Texas	House show		
15	Pepper Gomez (6) and Dory Dixon (2)	1	June 16, 1961	(Note: The exact date on which Gomez and Dixon lost the title is unknown, which means the title reign lasted between 138 and 167 days.)	Houston, Texas	House show		
16	Dalton Brothers (Jack and Jim Dalton)	1	November 1961	(Note: The exact date on which the Dalton Brothers won the title is unknown, which means the title reign lasted between 148 and 177 days.)	Texas	House show		
17	Dory Dixon (3) and Ciclon Negro	1	April 27, 1962	(Note: The exact date on which Dixon and Ciclon Negro lost the title is unknown, which means the title reign lasted between 1 day and 40 days.)	Houston, Texas	House show		
18	Dalton Brothers (Jack and Jim Dalton)	2	1962	(Note: The exact date on which the Dalton Brothers won the title is unknown, which means the title reign lasted between 1 day and 40 days.)	Texas	House show		
19	Kozak Brothers (Nick and Jerry Kozak)	1	June 8, 1962	70	Houston, Texas	House show		
20	Tarzan Tyler and The Alaskan	1	August 17, 1962	21	Houston, Texas	House show		
21	Duke Keomuka (3) and Taro Miyake	1	September 7, 1962	21	Houston, Texas	House show		
22	Mike Clancy and Red McKim	1	September 28, 1962	14	Houston, Texas	House show		
23	Duke Keomuka (4) and Taro Miyake	2	October 12, 1962	21	Houston, Texas	House show		
24	Ciclon Negro (2) and Oscar Salazar	1	November 2, 1962	18	Houston, Texas	House show		
25	Tony Borne and Ivan the Terrible	1	November 20, 1962	70	Houston, Texas	House show		
26	Bull Curry and Lucas Pertano	1	January 29, 1963	7	Houston, Texas	House show		
27	Rip Hawk and Rock Hunter	1	February 5, 1963	44	Houston, Texas	House show		
28	Kozak Brothers (Nick and Jerry Kozak)	2	March 21, 1963	135	Austin, Texas	House show		
29	The Von Brauners (Kurt and Karl Von Brauner	1	July 5, 1963	(Note: The exact date on which the Von Brauners lost the title is unknown, which means the title reign lasted between 27 and 42 days.)	Houston, Texas	House show		
30	Dalton Brothers (Jack and Jim Dalton)	3	August 1963	(Note: The exact date on which the Dalton Brothers won the title is unknown, which means the title reign lasted between 1 day and 15 days.)	Texas	House show		
31	Ciclon Negro (3) and Ricki Starr	1	August 16, 1963	(Note: The exact date on which the title was abandoned is unknown, which means the title reign lasted between 1 day and 137 days.)	Houston, Texas	House show		
—	Inactive	—	1963	—	N/A	N/A	Championship not promoted for around two years	
32	Fritz Von Erich and Killer Karl Kox	1	June 29, 1965	(Note: The length of this championship reign is too uncertain to calculate.)	Dallas, Texas	House show	Defeated Eddie Graham and Sam Steamboat to win the championship	
33	Duke Keomuka (5) and Kanji Inoki	1	1965-1966		Texas	House show		
34	The Destroyer and Golden Terror	1	February 8, 1966	21	Dallas, Texas	House show		
35	Fritz Von Erich (2) and Duke Keomuka (6)	1	March 1, 1966	(Note: The exact date on which Von Erich and Keomuka lost the title is unknown, which means the title reign lasted between 245 and 274 days.)	Dallas, Texas	House show		
36	The Internationals (Al Costello and Karl Von Brauner (2))	1	November 1966	(Note: The exact date on which the title was vacated is unknown, which means the title reign lasted between 32 and 218 days.)	Texas	House show		
—	Vacated	—	1967	—	N/A	N/A	Championship vacated for undocumented reasons.	
37	Nick Kozak (3) and Danny Miller	1	June 8, 1967	(Note: The exact date on which the championship was vacated is unknown, which means the title reign lasted between 1 day and 160 days.)	Amarillo, Texas	House show	Defeat the Medics to win the championship	
—	Vacated	—	1967	—	N/A	N/A	Championship vacated or undocumented reasons.	
38	The Von Brauners (Kurt and Karl Von Brauner (3))	2	November 15, 1967	162	Texas	House show	Defeat Gory Guerrero and Luis Hernandez	
39	Nick Bockwinkel and Ricky Romero	1	April 25, 1968	28	Texas	House show		
40	The Von Brauners (Kurt and Karl Von Brauner (4))	3	May 23, 1968	26	Amarillo, Texas	House show		
41	Dory Funk Jr. and Terry Funk	1	June 18, 1968	100	San Angelo, Texas	House show		
42	The Infernos (Inferno #1 and Inferno #2)	1	September 26, 1968	21	Amarillo, Texas	House show		
43	Dory Funk Jr. and Terry Funk	2	October 17, 1968	56	Amarillo, Texas	House show		
44	Mr. Ito and Chati Yokouchi	1	December 12, 1968		Amarillo, Texas	House show		
—	Inactive	—	1969/1970	—	N/A	N/A	Championship abandoned	
45	Hercules Ayala and Ali Mustafa	1	January 1981	(Note: The exact date on which Ayala and Mustafa won and lost the title is unknown, which means the title reign lasted between 1 day and 58 days.)	N/A	BTW Show	Awarded	
46	The Von Erichs; David and Kevin Von Erich	1	February 1981	(Note: The exact date on which the Von Erichs won and lost the title is unknown, which means the title reign lasted between 1 day and 271 days.)	Dallas, Texas	WCCW Star Wars 1981		
47	Great Kabuki and Chan Chung	1	1981	(Note: The exact date on which Kabuki and Chung won and lost the title is unknown, which means the title reign lasted between 1 day and 271 days.)	Texas	BTW Show		
48	Kerry Von Erich and Terry Orndorff	1	October 1981	(Note: The exact date on which Von Erich and Orndorff won and lost the title is unknown, which means the title reign lasted between 1 day and 60 days.)	Dallas, Texas	BTW Show		
49	Bill Irwin and Frank Dusek	1	November 1981	(Note: The exact date on which Irwin and Dusek lost the title is unknown, which means the title reign lasted between 1 day and 60 days.)	N/A	N/A	Awarded	
50	Kerry Von Erich (2) and Al Madril	1	December 1981	(Note: The exact date on which Von Erich and Madrill lost the title is unknown, which means the title reign lasted between 91 and 150 days.)	Ft. Worth, Texas	BTW Show		
51	Bill Irwin (2) and Bugsy McGraw	1	April 1982	(Note: The exact date on which Irwin and McGraw lost the title is unknown, which means the title reign lasted between 1 day and 29 days.)	Lawton, Oklahoma	WCCW Show		
52	Kerry Von Erich (3) and Al Madril	2	April 1982	(Note: The exact date on which the title was abandoned is unknown, which means the title reign lasted between 1 day and 274 days.)	Ft. Worth, Texas	WCCW Show		
—	Retired	—	1982	—	N/A	N/A	Championship abandoned by WCCW.	

== Team reigns by combined length ==
Key

Symbol	Meaning
¤	The exact length of at least one title reign is uncertain, so the shortest possible length is used.

Rank	Team	No. of reigns	Combined days
1	Pepper Gomezand Rito Romero	1	274¤
2	Fritz Von Erich and Duke Keomuka	1	245¤
3	Pepper Gomez and Wilbur Snyder	1	217¤
4	The Von Brauners	4	216
5	The Kozak Brothers	2	205
6	Dory Funk Jr. and Terry Funk	2	156
7	The Dalton Brothers	3	150¤
8	Pepper Gomez and Dory Dixon	1	130¤
9	Pepper Gomez and Torbelino Blanco	1	93¤
10	Pepper Gomez and El Medico	1	87
11	Tony Borne and Ivan the Terrible	1	70
12	Duke Keomuka and Mr. Moto	1	69¤
13	Kerry Von Erich and Al Madril	2	62¤
14	Pepper Gomez and Ciclone Anaya	1	52
15	Hogan Wharton and Adnon Kaisy	1	49
16	Rip Hawk and Rock Hunter	1	44
17	Duke Keomuka and Taro Miyake	2	42
18	The Internationals	1	32¤
19	Danny McShain and Joe Christie	1	30¤
20	Nick Bockwinkel and Ricky Romero	1	28
21	Duke Keomuka and Tony Martin	1	21
21	Rito Romero and Dory Dixon	1	21
21	Tarzan Tyler and The Alaskan	1	21
21	The Destroyer and Golden Terror	1	21
21	The Infernos	1	21
26	Ciclon Negro and Oscar Salazar	1	18
27	Joe Christie and Man Mountain Managoff	1	14
27	Mike Clancy and Red McKim	1	14
27	The Fabulous Kangaroos	1	14
30	Bull and Lucas Pertano	1	7
31	Ciclon Negro and Ricki Starr	1	1¤
31	Dory Dixon and Ciclon Negro	1	1¤
31	Verne Gagne and Wilbur Snyder	1	1¤
31	Great Kabuki and Chang Chung	1	1¤
31	Hercules Ayala and Ali Mustafa	1	1¤
31	Bill Irwin and Bugsy McGraw	1	1¤
31	Bill Irwin and Frank Dusek	1	1¤
31	Nick Kozak and Danny Miller	1	1¤
31	Bill Longson and Ike Eakins	1	1¤
31	Kerry Von Erich and Terry Orndorff	1	1¤
41	Mr. Ito and Chati Yokouchi	1	¤
41	Duke Keomuka and Kanji Inoki	1	¤
41	Fritz Von Erich and Killer Karl Kox	1	¤

== Individual reigns by combined length ==
Key

Symbol	Meaning
¤	The exact length of at least one title reign is uncertain, so the shortest possible length is used.

Rank	Wrestler	No. of reigns	Combined days
1	Pepper Gomez	6	861¤
2	Duke Keomuka	6	318¤
3	Rito Romero	2	295¤
4	Karl Von Brauner	5	248¤
5	Fritz Von Erich	2	245¤
6	Wilbur Snyder	2	218¤
7	Kurt Von Brauner	4	216
8	Nick Kozak	3	206¤
9	Jerry Kozak	2	205
10	Dory Dixon	3	160¤
11	Dory Funk Jr.	2	156
12	Terry Funk	2	156
13	Jack Dalton	3	150¤
13	Jim Dalton	3	150¤
15	Torbellino Blanco	1	93¤
16	El Medico	1	87
17	Tony Borne	1	70
18	Ivan the Terrible	1	70
19	Mr. Moto	1	69¤
20	Kerry Von Erich	3	63¤
21	Al Madril	2	62¤
22	Ciclone Anaya	1	52
23	Adnon Kaisy	1	49
24	Hogan Wharton	1	49
25	Al Costello	2	46¤
26	Joe Christie	2	44¤
26	Rock Hunter	1	44
26	Hawk	1	44
29	Taro Miyake	2	42
30	Danny McShain	1	30¤
31	Nick Bockwinkel	1	28
31	Ricky Romero	1	28
33	The Alaskan	1	21
33	The Destroyer	1	21
33	Golden Terror	1	21
33	Inferno #1	1	21
33	Inferno #2	1	21
33	Tony Martin	1	21
33	Tarzan Tyler	1	21
40	Oscar Salazar	1	18
41	Mike Clancy	1	14
41	Roy Heffernan	1	14
41	Man Mountain Managoff	1	14
41	Red McKim	1	14
45	Bull Pertano	1	7
45	Lucas Pertano	1	7
47	Ciclon Negro	3	3¤
48	Bill Irwin	2	2¤
49	Chang Chung	1	1¤
49	Frank Dusek	1	1¤
49	Ike Eakins	1	1¤
49	Verne Gagne	1	1¤
49	Great Kabuki	1	1¤
49	Hercules Ayala	1	1¤
49	Bill Longson	1	1¤
49	Bugsy McGraw	1	1¤
49	Danny Miller	1	1¤
49	Ali Mustafa	1	1¤
49	Terry Orndorff	1	1¤
49	Ricki Starr	1	1¤
61	Kanji Inoki	1	¤
61	Mr. Ito	1	¤
61	Killer Karl Kox	1	¤
61	Chati Yokouchi	1	¤

== See also ==
- National Wrestling Alliance
- NWA World Tag Team Championship

== Concurrent championships ==
Sources for 13 simultaneous NWA World Tag Team Championships

- NWA World Tag Team Championship (Los Angeles version)
- NWA World Tag Team Championship (San Francisco version)
- NWA World Tag Team Championship (Central States version)
- NWA World Tag Team Championship (Chicago version)
- NWA World Tag Team Championship (Buffalo Athletic Club version)
- NWA World Tag Team Championship (Georgia version)
- NWA World Tag Team Championship (Iowa/Nebraska version)
- NWA World Tag Team Championship (Indianapolis version)
- NWA World Tag Team Championship (Salt Lake Wrestling Club version)
- NWA World Tag Team Championship (Amarillo version)
- NWA World Tag Team Championship (Minneapolis version)
- NWA World Tag Team Championship (Texas version)
- NWA World Tag Team Championship (Mid-America version)
