= Danny McShain =

American professional wrestler

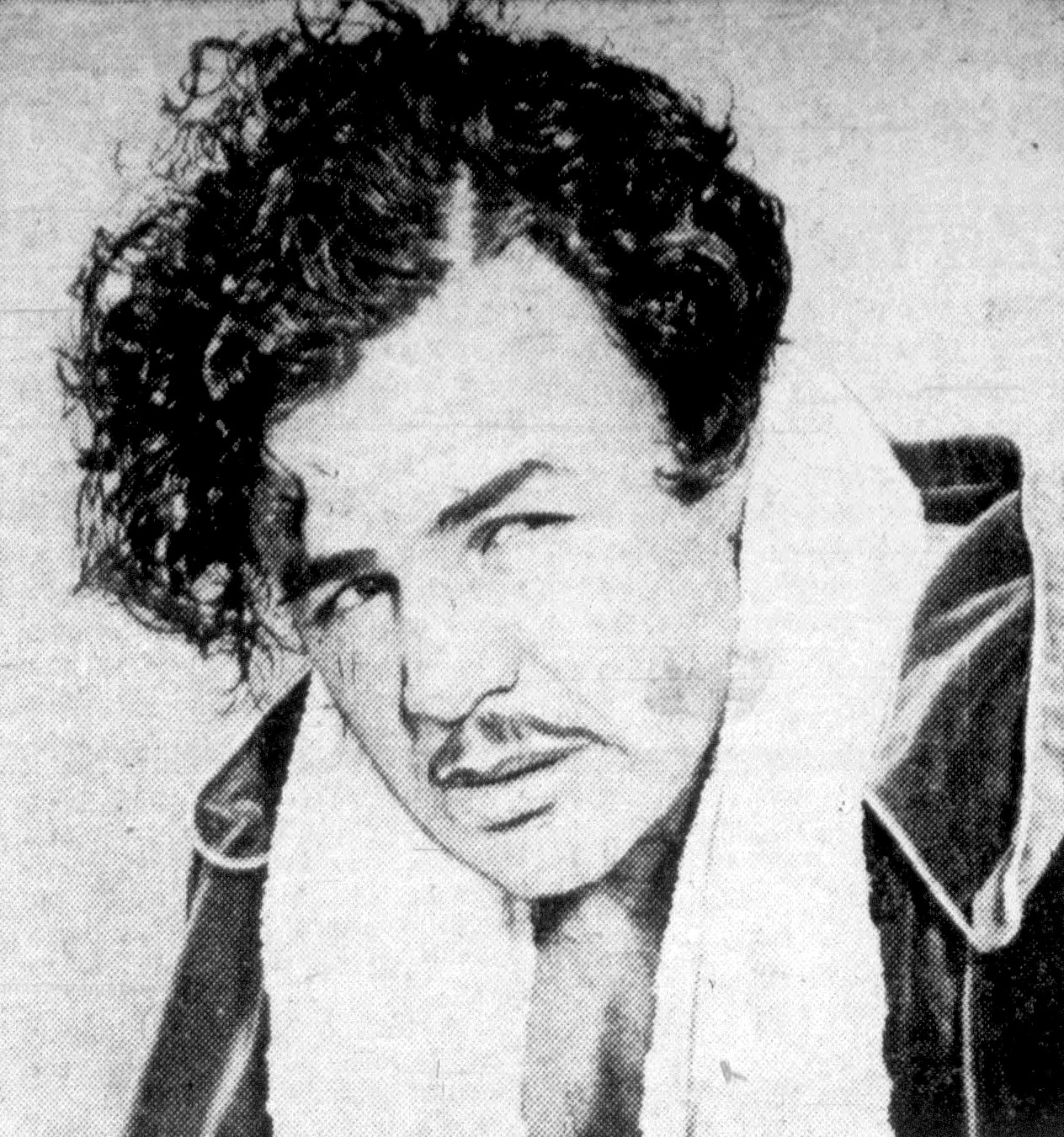
- McShain, circa 1945

Personal information
- Born: Danny McShain; October 30, 1912 Little Rock, Arkansas, U.S.
- Died: July 14, 1992 (aged 79) Alvin, Texas, U.S.
- Spouse: Sallee Lewin
- Family: Mark Lewin (brother-in-law); Donn Lewin (brother-in-law)
- Website
- Military service
- Allegiance: United States
- Branch: United States Navy

Professional wrestling career
- Ring name: Danny McShain
- Billed height: 5 ft 11 in (180 cm)
- Billed weight: 205 lb (93 kg)
- Debut: October 30, 1930
- Retired: 1967

Danny McShain (October 30, 1912 – July 14, 1992) was an American professional wrestler. He competed in the southern United States from the 1930s to the 1960s.

== Early life ==
McShain was born on October 30, 1912, in Little Rock, Arkansas. McShain later joined the United States Navy, where he excelled as a boxer and won several championships.

== Professional wrestling career ==
He made his professional wrestling debut in Little Rock, Arkansas on October 30, 1930. McShain's family moved to Glendale, California, where he competed for the National Wrestling Alliance (NWA). He won his first championship, the NWA World Light Heavyweight Championship, on October 11, 1937. Over the next ten years, he held the title another nine times.

He later moved to Alvin, Texas, where he continued to compete for the NWA. He won the NWA Texas Heavyweight Championship on ten occasions between in 1948 and 1960 by defeating such wrestlers as Antonino Rocca and Verne Gagne. On November 19, 1951, he also defeated Gagne to win the NWA World Junior Heavyweight Championship. In 1954, McShain won the NWA American Tag Team Championship with partner Oyama Kato while competing for the Midwest Wrestling Association in Ohio.

After his retirement, McShain worked as a referee in Texas.

== Ring style ==
McShain wrestled as a "tough guy", displaying a scientific yet dirty grappling style with stiff strikes; he proudly advertised his list of injuries to demonstrate the amount of punishment his body could take. He was also known for blading, as he often cut his own forehead during matches to draw blood. McShain was a stiff worker, as he put legitimate force behind his punches and made contact with his opponents rather than pretending to hit them. He used a piledriver as one of his ring moves, in which he would hold his opponents upside-down and then drop them head-first to the ring floor. McShain attributed the piledriver to the deaths of two opponents.

McShain used a cocky strut to anger opponents and spectators. His brother-in-law Donn Lewin stated that the strut was so arrogant that it "made you want to kill him" and that he walked the same way in real life. McShain was arrested once after starting a riot by spitting tobacco juice from his trademark cigar on an opponent. His behavior was considered so inappropriate that he was summoned to appear in front of the Texas Gaming Commission. He was also the subject of another inquiry, as he changed the pre-planned outcome of a bout midway through the match. Because there was a championship on the line and two promoters were arguing over the wrestling territory in which the match took place, the United States Department of Justice became involved. The match was the origin of the rule used in many promotions that prevents a title belt from changing hands when the match ends with a disqualification. Following his end to in ring action he worked as a referee in Houston.

== Personal life ==
In a match against Donn Lewin, McShain broke Lewin's nose. Shortly thereafter, Lewin's father invited McShain to dinner. McShain met Donn's sister Sallee, whom he later married.

McShain appeared in the 1949 movie The Inspector General, as well as several other films. He died in Alvin, Texas on July 14, 1992.

== Championships and accomplishments ==
- Midwest Wrestling Association
  - MWA American Tag Team Championship (1 time)
- National Wrestling Association
  - NWA World Light Heavyweight Championship (10 times)
- NWA Mid-America
  - NWA World Junior Heavyweight Championship (1 time)
- Southwest Sports, Inc.
  - NWA Texas Heavyweight Championship (7 times)
  - NWA Brass Knuckles Championship (Texas version) (6 times)
  - NWA World Tag Team Championship (6 times) - with Joe Christie
- Professional Wrestling Hall of Fame and Museum
  - (Class of 2010)
- Wrestling Observer Newsletter
  - Wrestling Observer Newsletter Hall of Fame (Class of 1996)

^{1}McShain won the title once just briefly before the formation of the National Wrestling Alliance when the title was simply referred to as the Texas Heavyweight Championship.
