= Duke Keomuka =

American professional wrestler (1921–1991)

Personal information
- Born: Martin Hisao Tanaka; April 22, 1921 Los Angeles, California, U.S.
- Died: June 30, 1991 (aged 70) Las Vegas, Nevada, U.S.
- Children: Pat Tanaka

Professional wrestling career
- Ring name(s): Hisao Tanaka; Duke Keomuka
- Trained by: Tsutao Higami
- Debut: 1947

Martin Hisao Tanaka (April 22, 1921 – June 30, 1991) was an American professional wrestler better known as Duke Keomuka. He is the father of wrestler Pat Tanaka and referee Jimmy Tanaka.

== Biography ==
Because he was a Japanese American in California during World War II, Tanaka was interned at Manzanar following the signing of Executive Order 9066.

In the 1950s, Keomuka formed a very successful tag team with Hiro Matsuda. Keomuka was also a top wrestler in the 1950s and the 1960s while competing in Texas before settling in Florida.

Keomuka died on June 30, 1991, at the age of 70. His son was scheduled for a match teaming up with Paul Diamond (who at the time worked as Kato of the Orient Express tag team) to take on Haku and The Barbarian but didn't arrive as his father died the day before the match, so his manager Mr. Fuji took his place.

== In popular culture ==
Keomuka is referenced in the 1988 novel The Silence of the Lambs by Thomas Harris.

== Championships and achievements ==
- 50th State Big Time Wrestling
  - NWA Hawaii Heavyweight Championship (1 time)
- Championship Wrestling from Florida
  - NWA World Tag Team Championship (Florida version) (4 times) - with Hiro Matsuda
- Mid-Atlantic Championship Wrestling
  - NWA Southern Tag Team Championship (Mid-Atlantic version) (2 times) - with Mr. Moto (wrestler)
- Midwest Wrestling Association
  - MWA Ohio Tag Team Championship (1 time) - with Sato Keomuka
- Southwest Sports, Inc. / Big Time Wrestling
  - NWA Brass Knuckles Championship (1 time)
  - NWA Texas Heavyweight Championship (6 times)
  - NWA Texas Tag Team Championship (14 times) - with Danny Savich (5), Ivan Kalmikoff (1), Mr. Moto (2), Don Evans (1), Tiny Mills (1), Kinji Shibuya (1), Tony Martin (1), Tokyo Joe (1) and John Tolos (1)
  - NWA World Tag Team Championship (6 times) - with Taro Miyaki (2), Mr. Moto (1), Tony Martin (1), Antonio Inoki (1) and Fritz Von Erich (1)
