= List of former WWE personnel (I–M) =

WWE is a sports entertainment company based in Stamford, Connecticut. Former employees (family name letters I–M) in WWE consist of professional wrestlers, managers, play-by-play and color commentators, announcers, interviewers, referees, trainers, script writers, executives, and board of directors.

WWE talents' contracts range from developmental contracts to multi-year deals. They primarily appeared on WWE television programming, pay-per-views, and live events, and talent with developmental contracts appeared at NXT (formerly Florida Championship Wrestling), or they appeared at WWE's former training facilities: Deep South Wrestling, Heartland Wrestling Association, International Wrestling Association, Memphis Championship Wrestling, or Ohio Valley Wrestling. When talent is released of their contract, it could be for a budget cut, the individual asking for their release, for personal reasons, time off from an injury, or retirement. In some cases, talent has died while they were contracted, such as Brian Pillman, Owen Hart, Eddie Guerrero, Chris Benoit and Bray Wyatt.

Those who made appearances without a contract and those who were previously released but are currently employed by WWE are not included.

== Alumni (I—M) ==
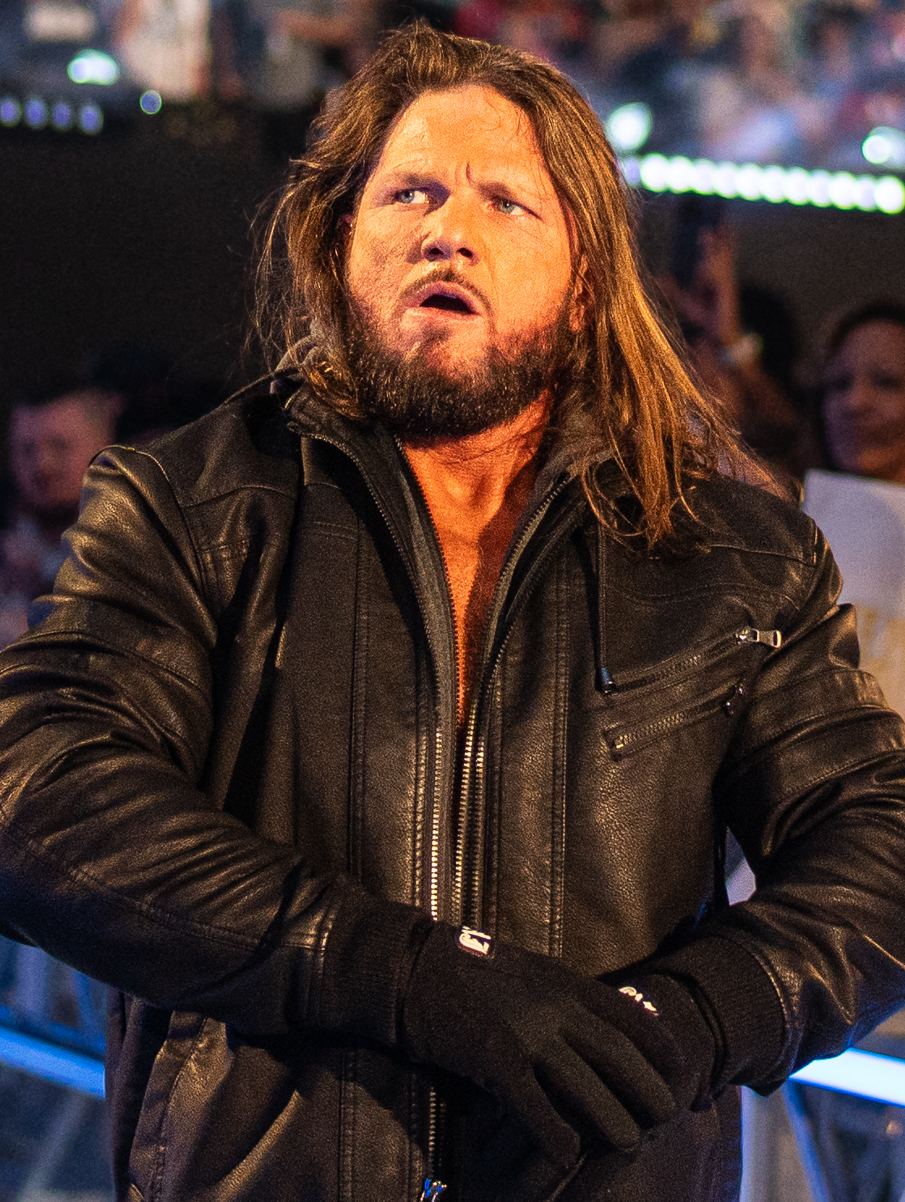
AJ Styles

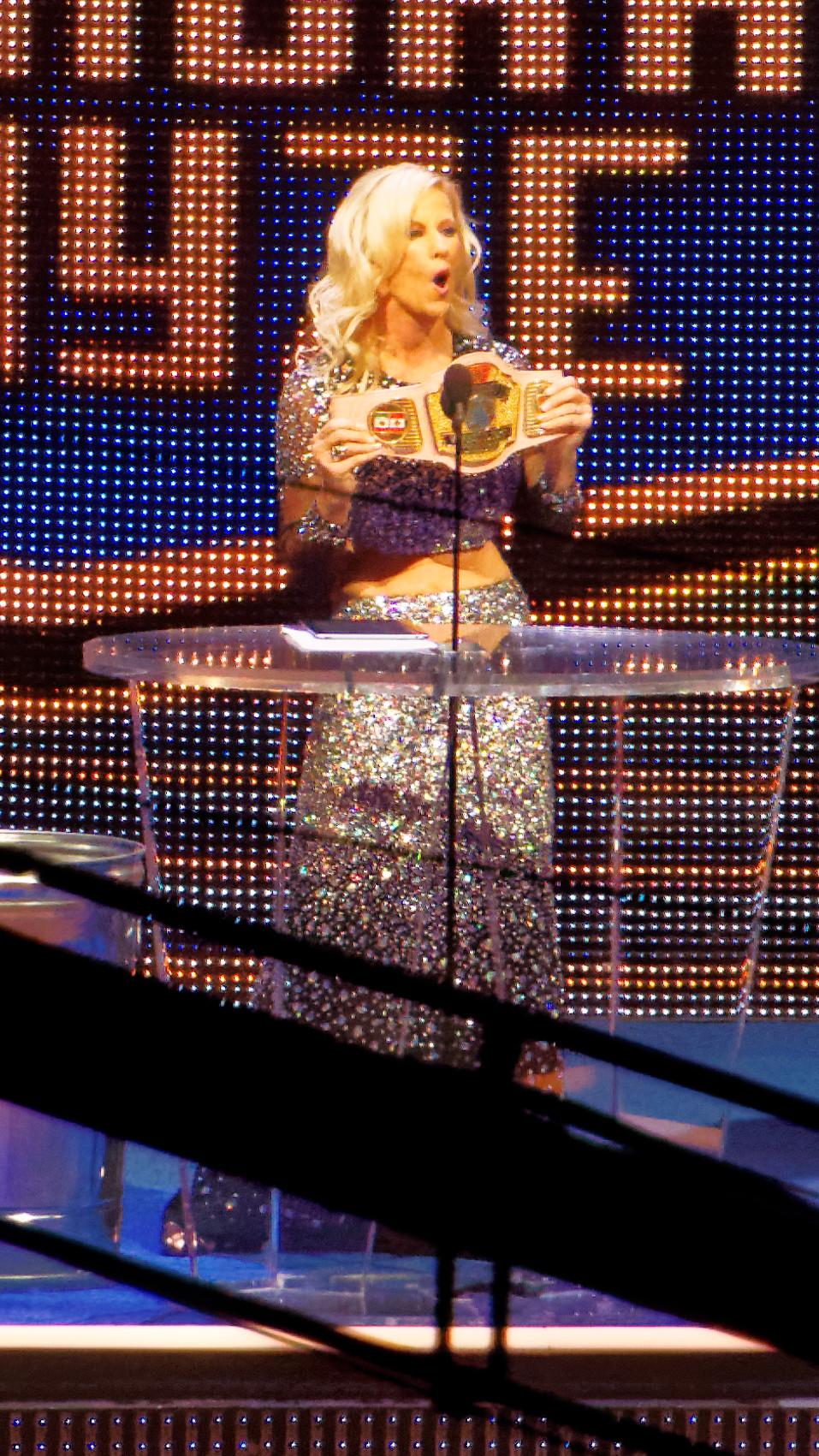
Alundra Blayze

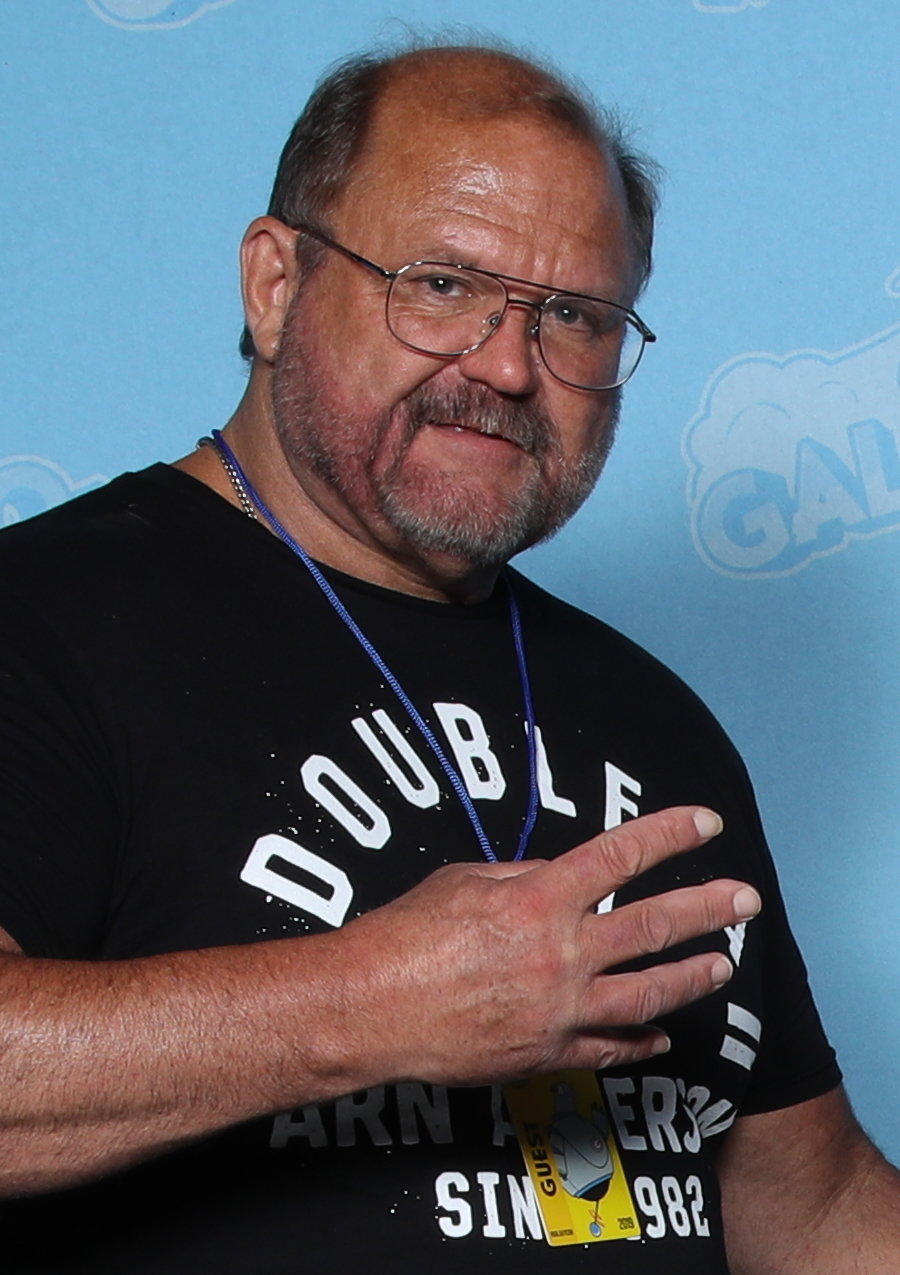
Arn Anderson

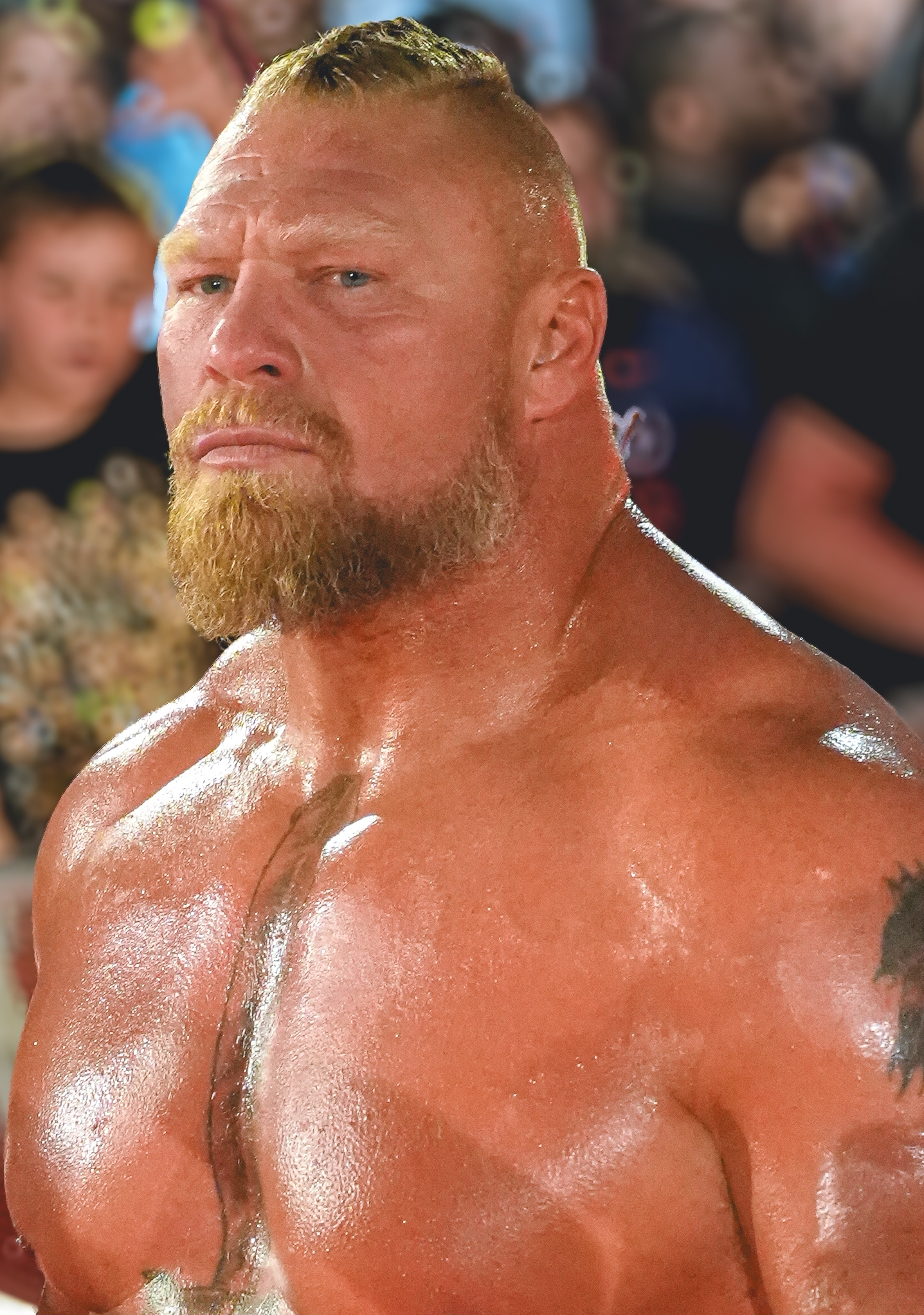
Brock Lesnar

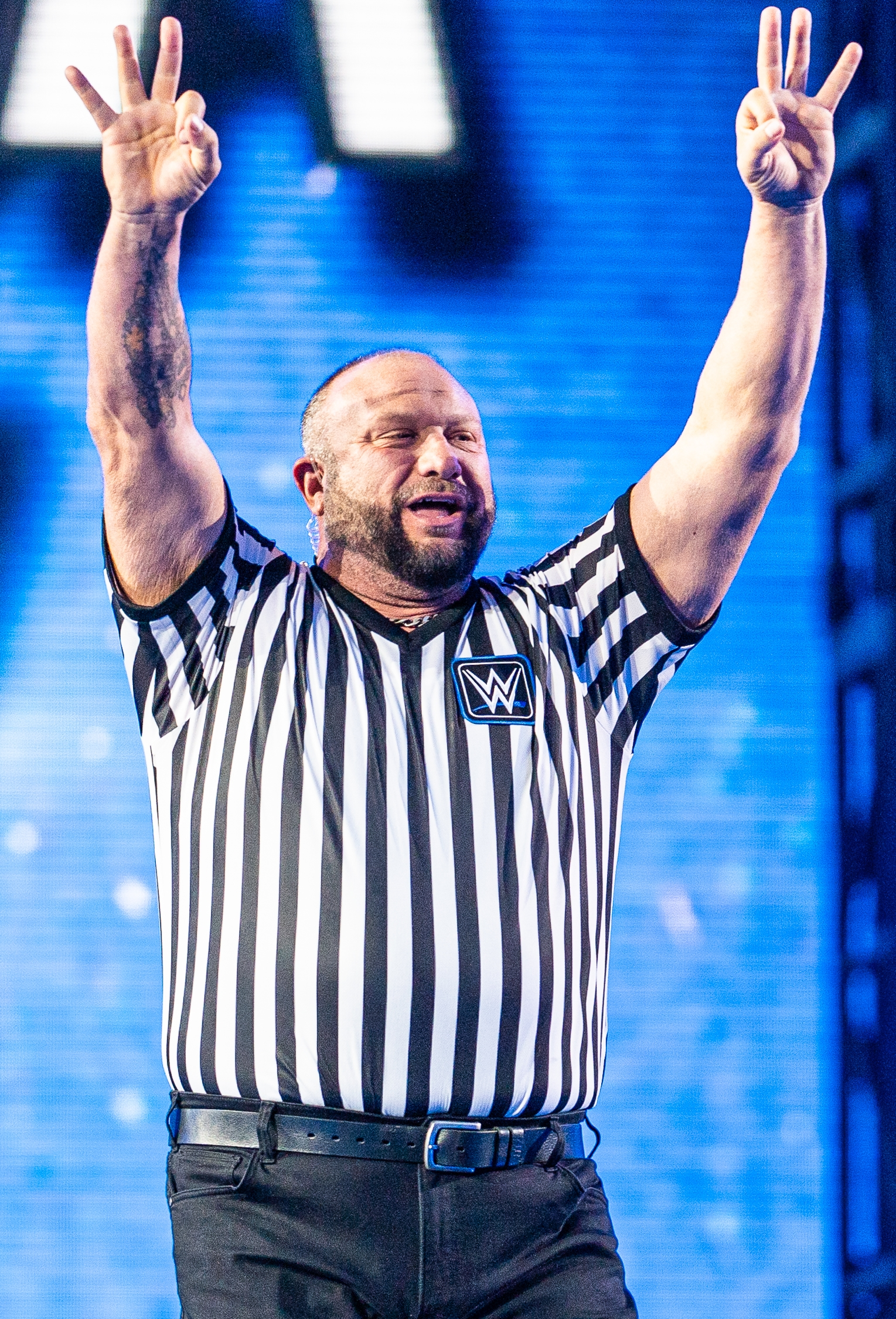
Bubba Ray Dudley

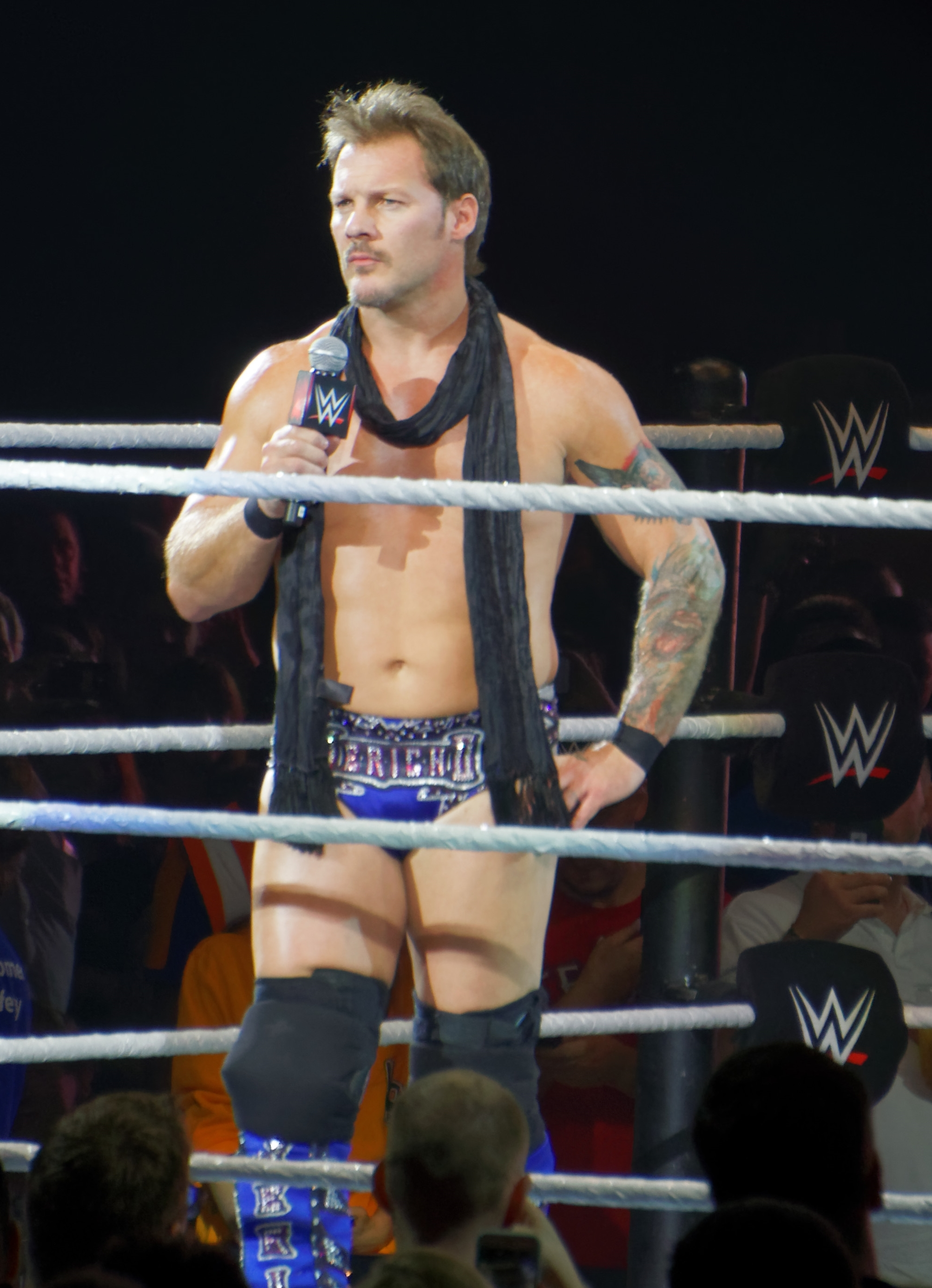
Chris Jericho

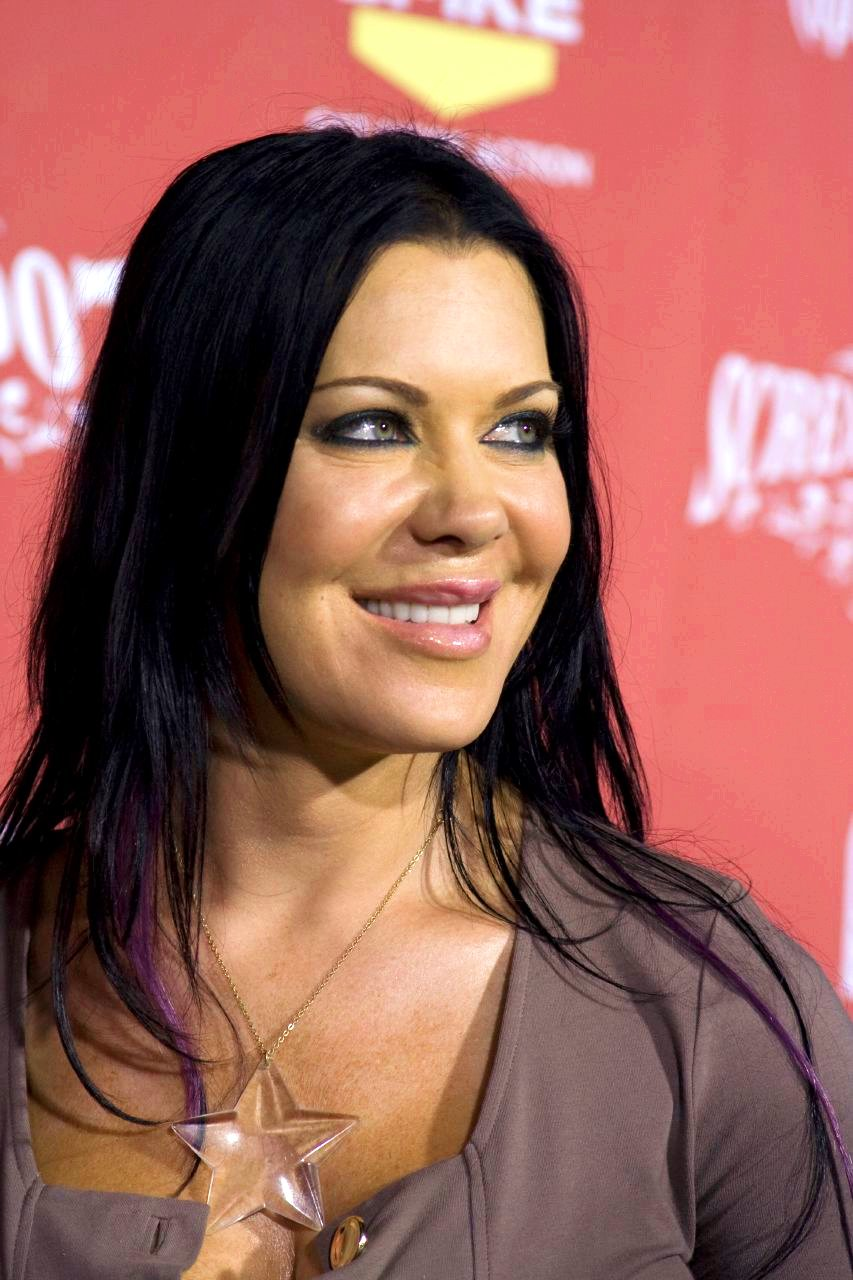
Chyna

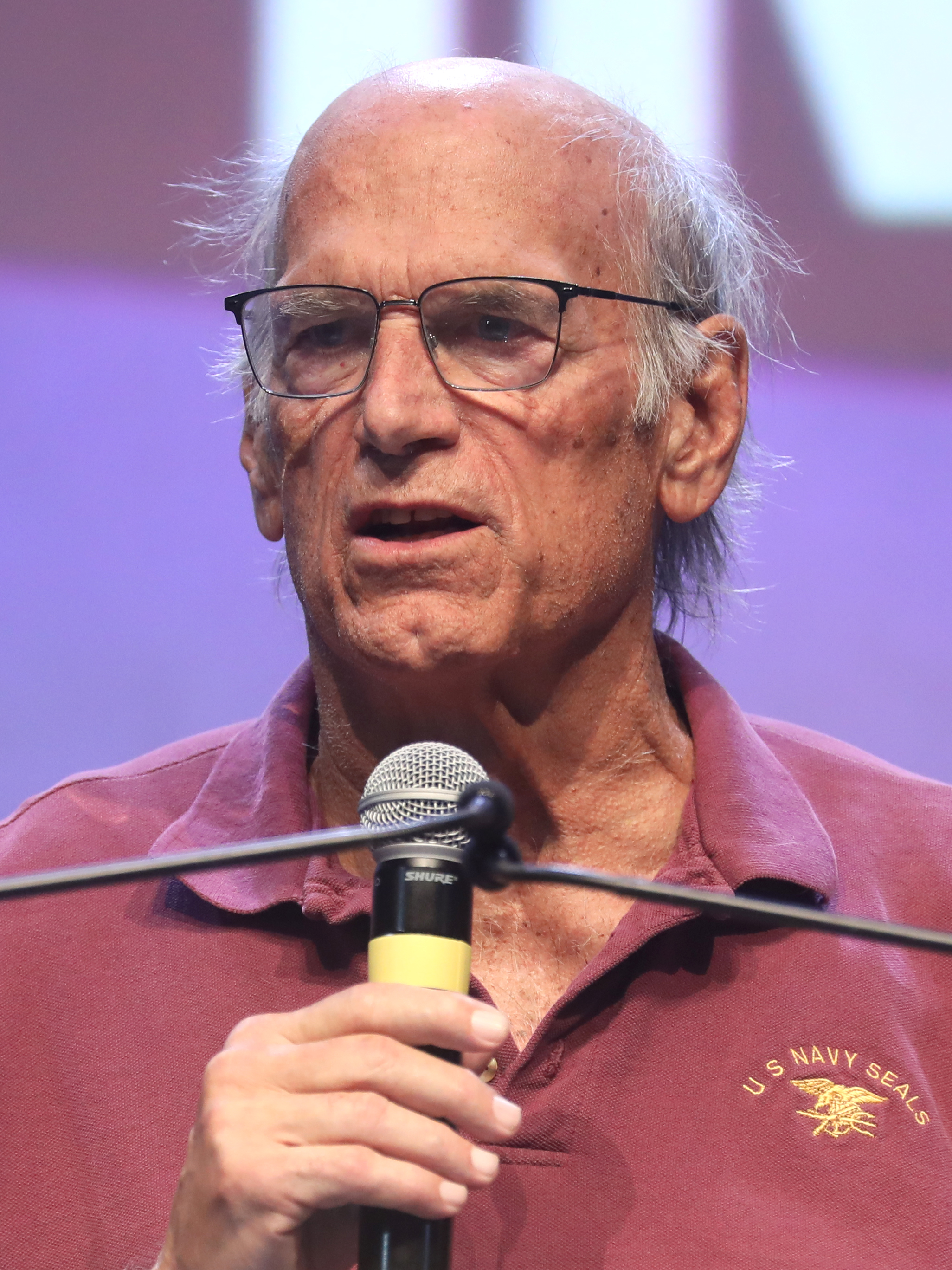
Jesse Ventura

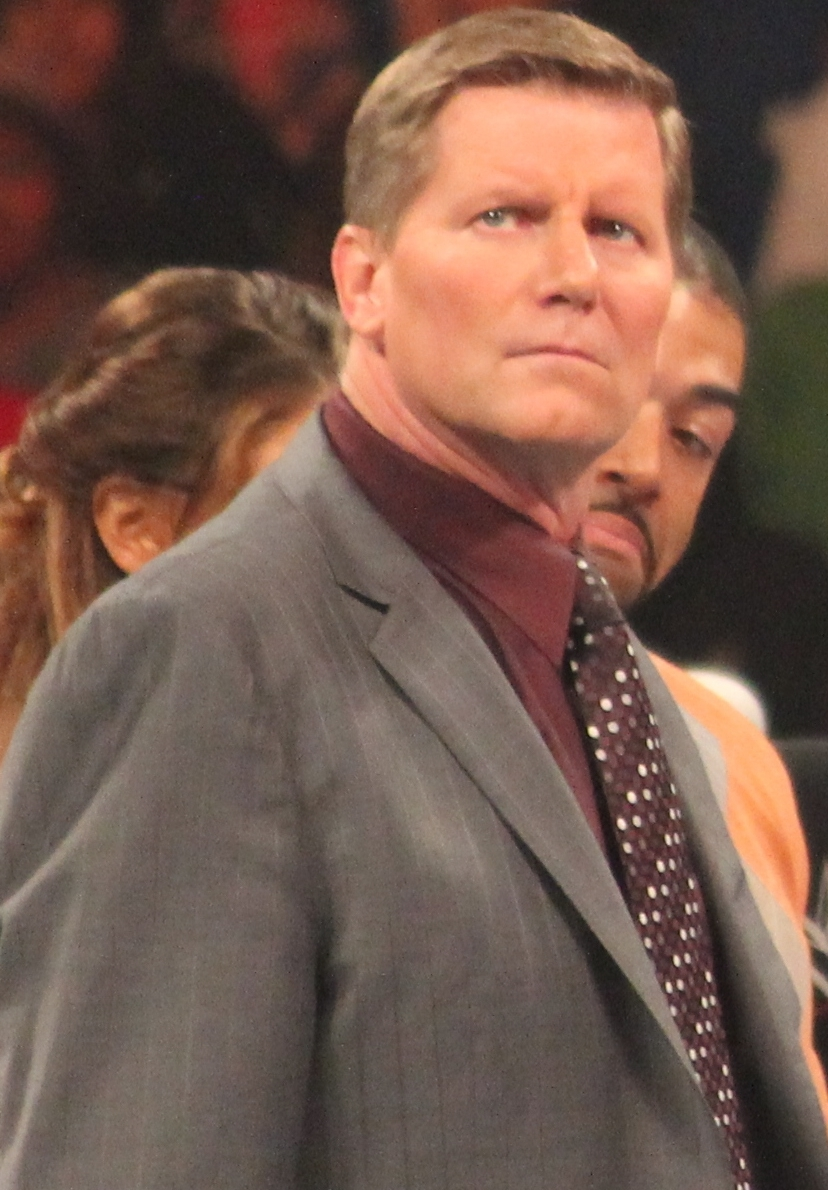
John Laurinaitis

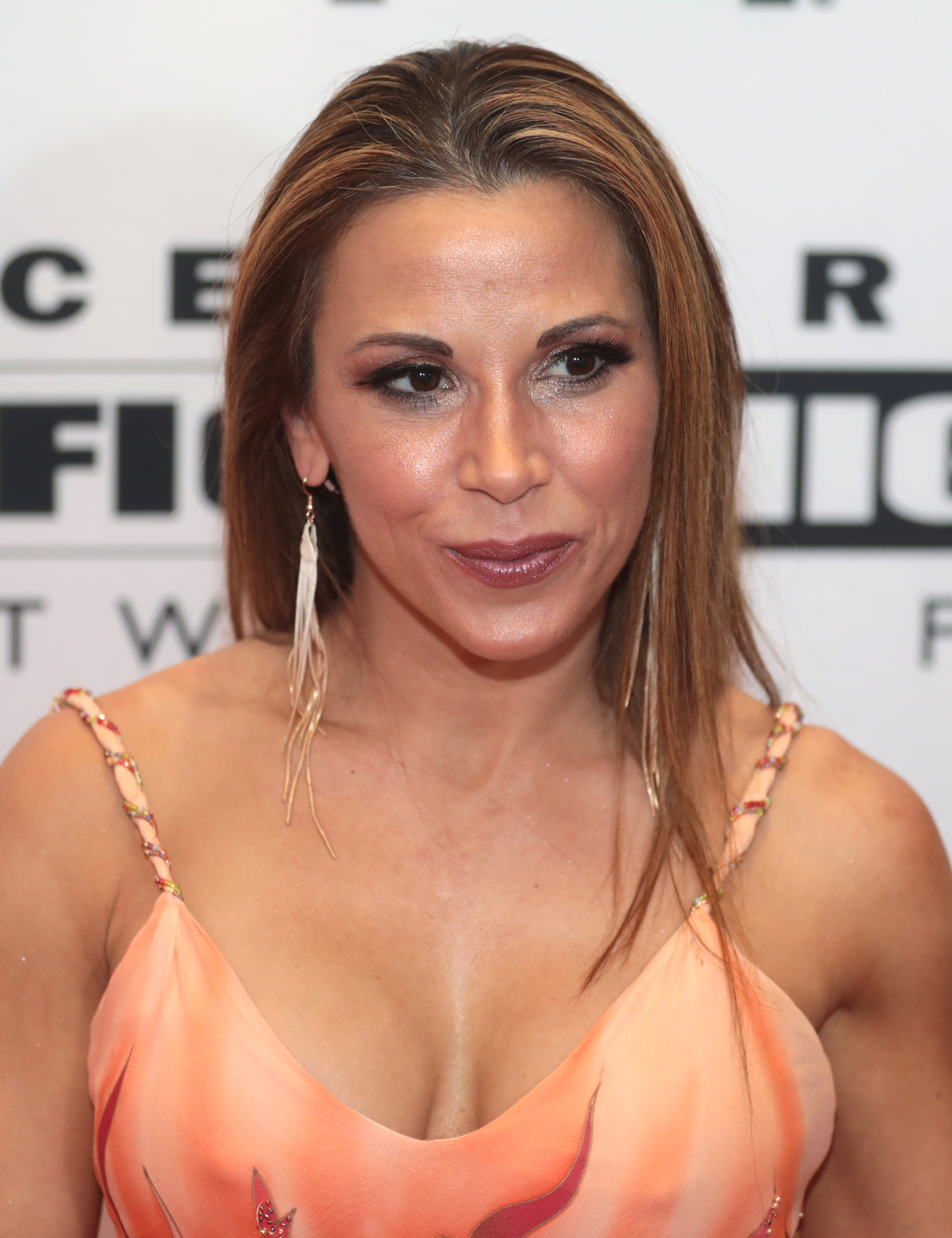
Mickie James

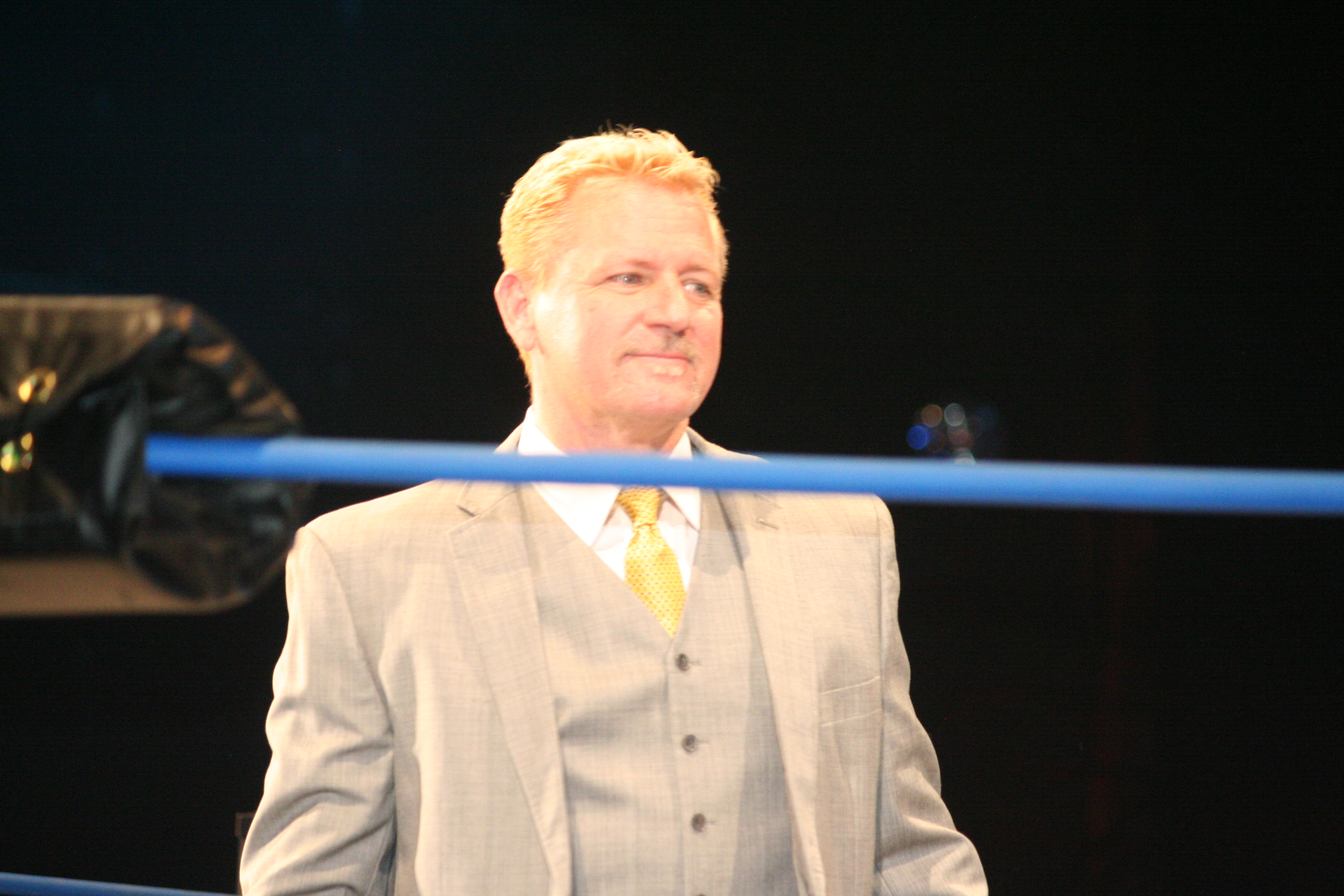
Jeff Jarrett

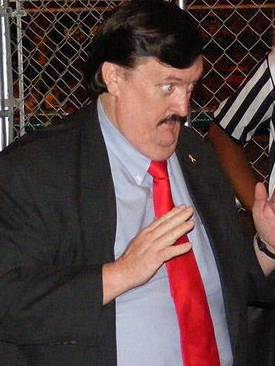
Paul Bearer

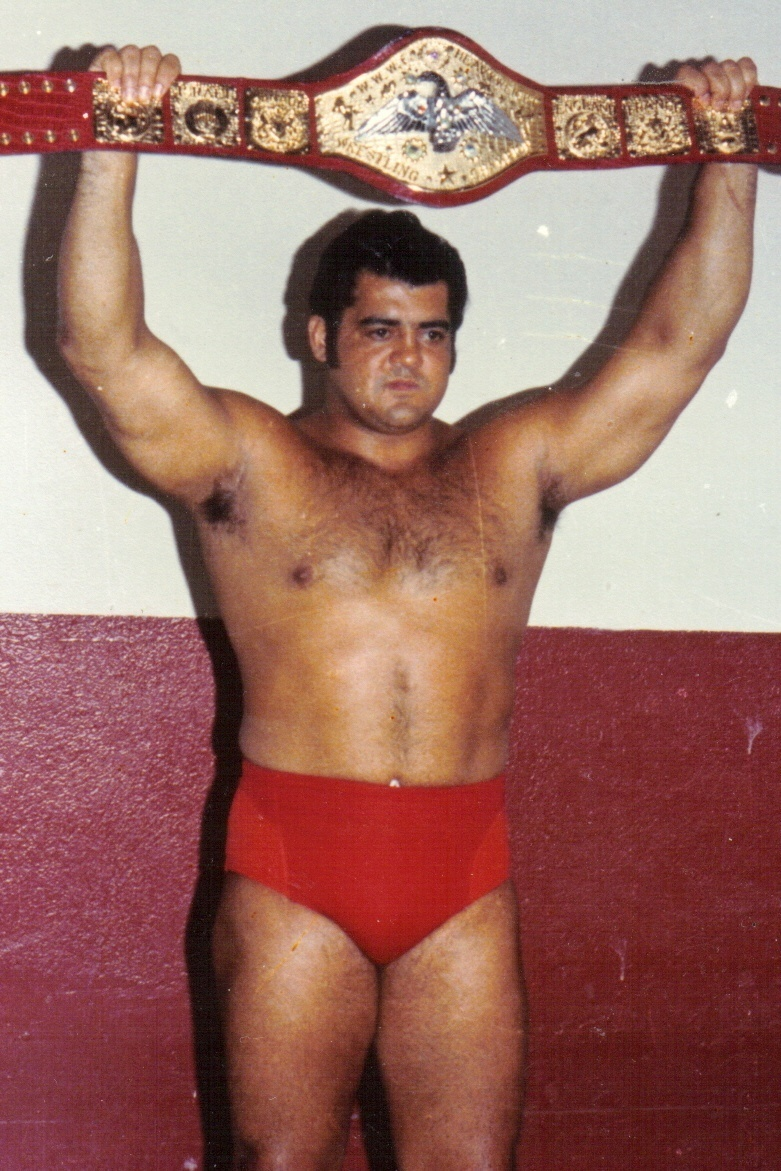
Pedro Morales

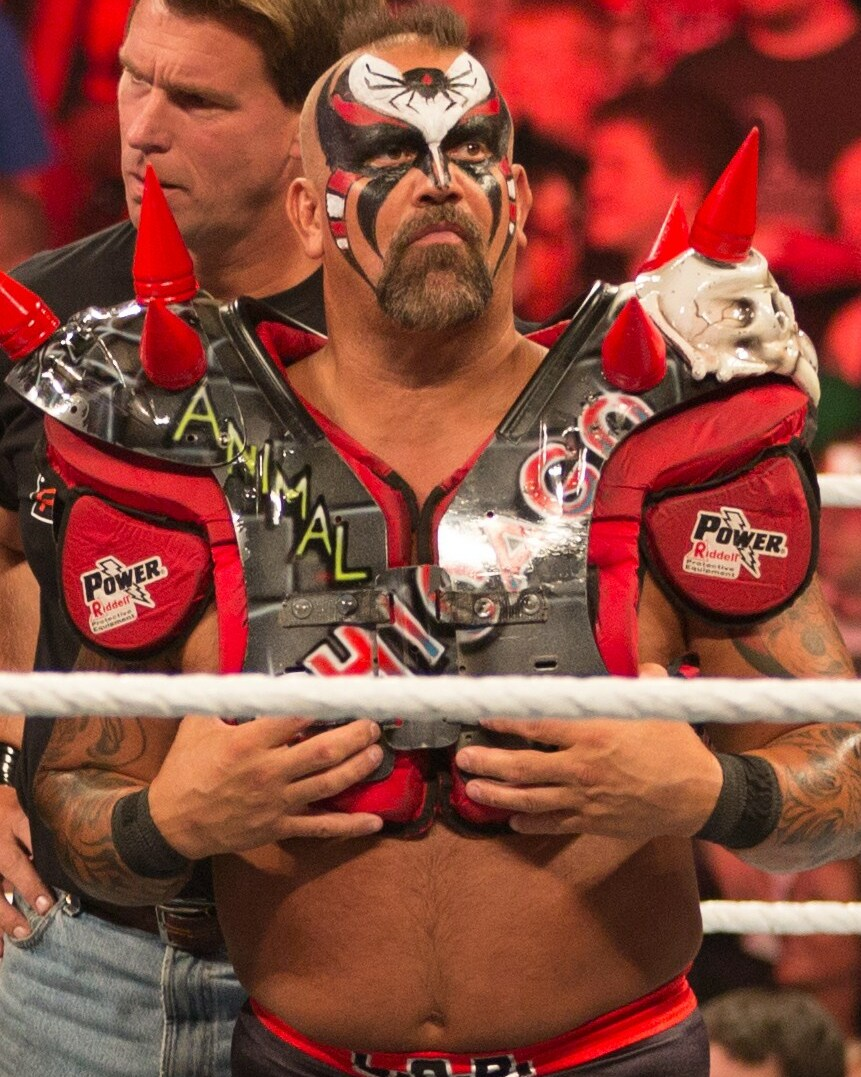
Road Warrior Animal

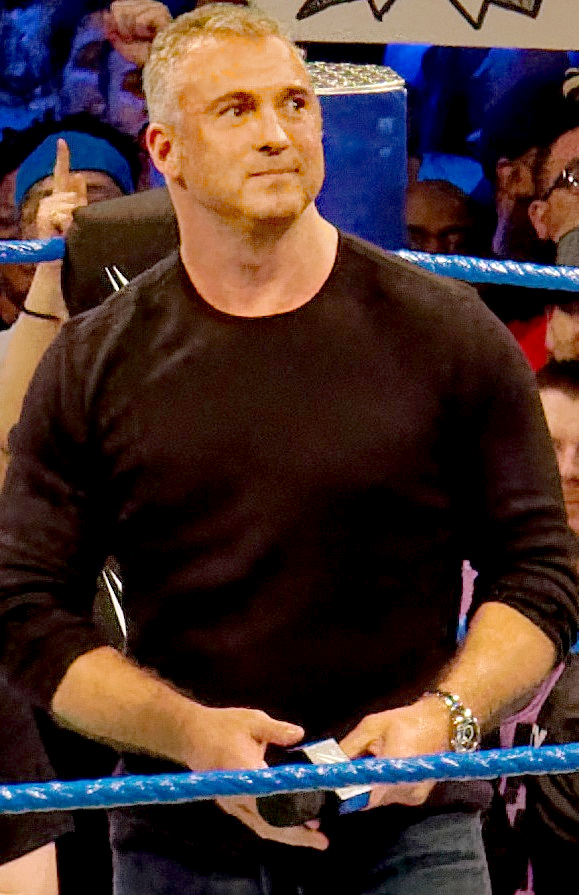
Shane McMahon

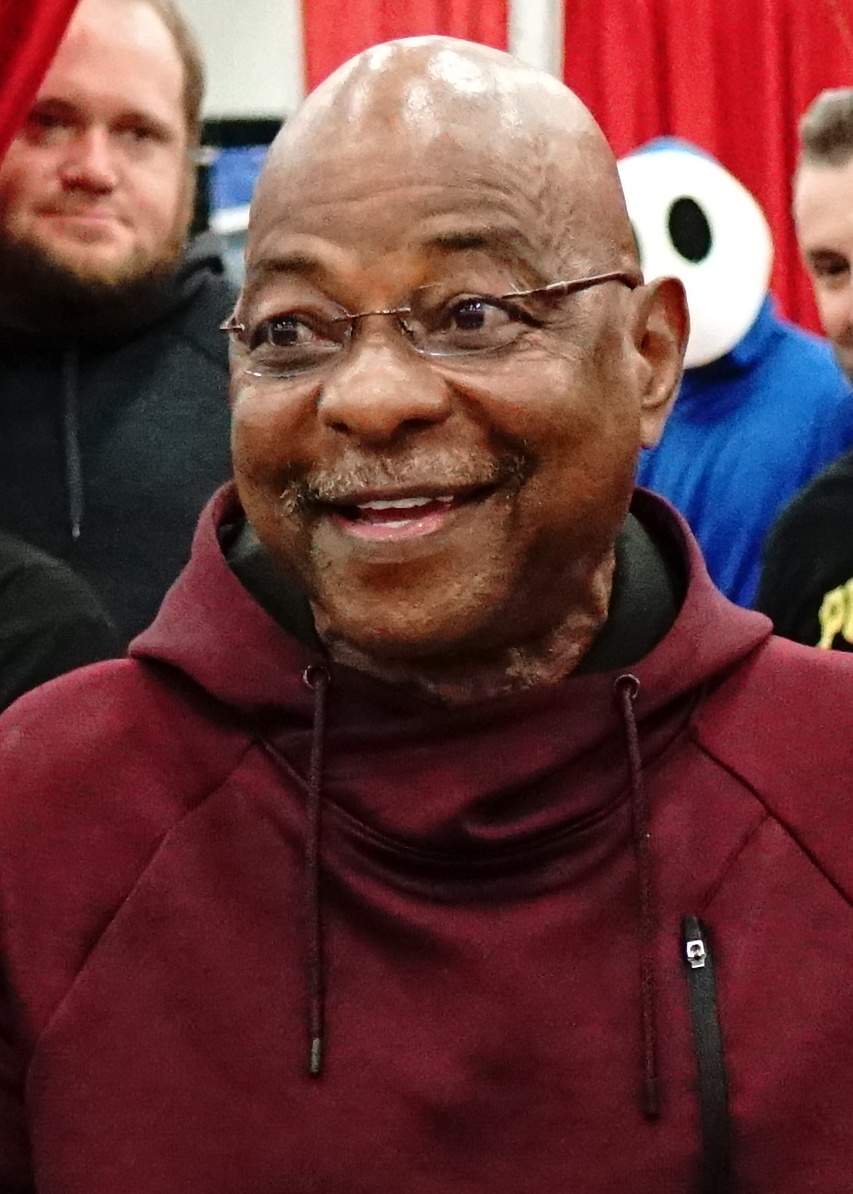
Theodore Long

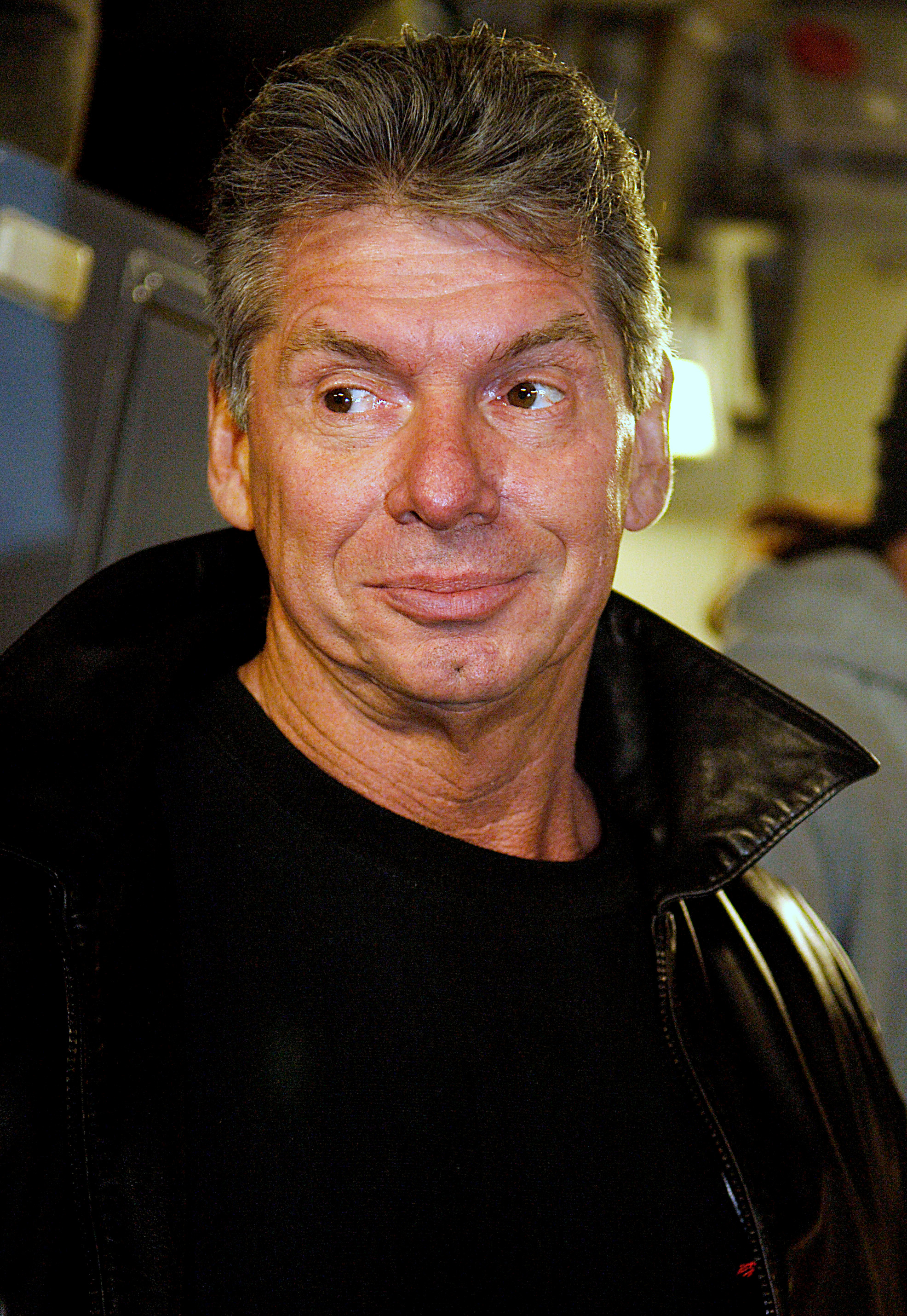
Vince McMahon

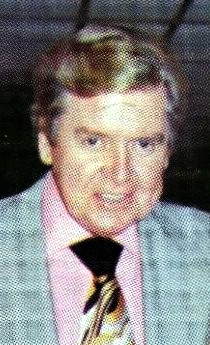
Vincent J. McMahon

Key
†	Indicates they are deceased
‡	Indicates they died while they were employed with WWE

Birth name	Ring name(s)	Tenure	Ref
Curtis Iaukea III ^{†}	Prince Iaukea; King Curtis Iaukea; The Wizard	1966; 1971–1973; 1986–1987	
Christopher Irvine	Chris Jericho	1999–2005; 2007–2010; 2011–2018	
Barney Irwin	The Goon	1996–1997	
Scott Irwin ^{†}	Yukon Eric	1978	
Tokimitsu Ishizawa	Kendo Kashin	2019–2020	
Francisco Islas Rueda	Super Crazy; Histeria; Super Loco	1997; 1998-1999; 2005-2008	
Karl Istaz ^{†}	Karl Gotch	1971–1972	
Glenn Jacobs	Isaac Yankem; Fake Diesel; Kane	1995–2018	
Mickie James-Aldis	Alexis Laree; Mickie James	2003–2010; 2016–2021	
Steven James	Lance Cassidy	1992–1993	
Frederick Jennetty	Marty Jannetty	1987; 1988-1992; 1993-1994; 1995-1997; 2005-2007; 2009	
James Janos	Jesse Ventura	1983–1990	
Adrian Jaodue	Adrian Jaodue; Arturo Ruas	2015–2021	
Jeff Jarrett	Jeff Jarrett	1993–1996; 1997-1999; 2019; 2022	
Jerry Jarrett ^{†}	Jerry Jarrett	1993–1994; 1999-2002	
Austin Jenkins	Adam Cole	2017–2021	
Monique Jenkins	MJ Jenkins; Monique Jenkins	2018–2020	
John Jeter	Johnny; Johnny Jeter; Consquitador Dos; Jayden Jeter	2003–2008	
Mark Jindrak	Mark Jindrak	2001–2005	
Cedric Johnson	Cedric Alexander; Gary Garbutt	2016–2025	
James Johnson ^{†}	Crazy Luke Graham	1964–1965; 1966–1969; 1971–1972; 1978	
Kenneth Johnson	Reverend Slick; Slick	1986–1993	
Larry Johnson ^{†}	Sonny King	1971–1973	
Samantha Johnson	Samantha Irvin	2021–2024	
Simone Johnson	Ava	2020–2026	
Dawn Johnston	Dawn Marie	1986–1987	
James Johnston	Jim Johnston	1985–2017	
Allen Jones	AJ Styles	2016-2026	
Lauren Jones	Lauren Jones	2004–2005	
Michael Jones ^{†}	Virgil	1987–1994; 2010	
Nathan Jones	Nathan Jones	2002–2003	
William Jones	Chilly Willy	2004-2005	
Orlando Jordan	Orlando Jordan	2003–2006	
Brian Jossie	Abraham Washington; A.W.	2009-2012	
Charles Kalani Jr. ^{†}	Professor Tanaka; Professor Toru Tanaka	1967–1968; 1969–1970; 1972–1974; 1977–1978	
Maria Kanellis	Maria; Maria Kanellis	2004–2010; 2017–2020	
McRonald Katmaka ^{†}	Tor Kamata	1976–1977; 1980	
Danielle Kamela	Vanessa Borne	2016–2021	
Drew Kasper	Brutus Creed; Bruto Credo	2021–2026	
Jacob Kasper	Julius Creed; Julio Credo	2020–2026	
Matthew Kaye	Matt Striker	2005-2013	
Frank Gerdelman	Frankie Kazarian	2005	
Lanny Kean Jr. ^{†}	Cousin Junior; Larry Kean	1984–1986	
Anna Jade Keefer	Adriana Rizzo	2022–2026	
Stacy Keibler	Stacy Keibler; Super Stacy	2001–2006	
Wayne Keown	Uncle Zebekiah; Zeb Colter	1994–1997; 2013–2016	
Priscilla Kelly	Gigi Dolin	2021–2025	
David Kenin ^{†}	David Kenin	1999–2014	
Kevin Kesar	Karrion Kross	2020–2021; 2022–2025	
Raymond Kessler	The Haiti Kid	1971–1972; 1975–1977; 1981–1987	
Kevin Kiley Jr.	Alex Riley	2007–2016	
Kenneth Kilpatrick	Ken Shamrock	1997–1999	
Gail Kim	Gail Kim	2002–2004; 2008–2011	
Eugene Kiniski ^{†}	Gene Kiniski; Gene Kelly	1964	
Tomoko Kitamura	Lioness Asuka	1987	
Kōji Kitao ^{†}	Kitao	1991	
Louis Klein ^{†}	Lou Bastien	1960–1961	
Christopher Klucsaritis ^{†}	Chris Kanyon	1994–1995; 2001–2004	
Dennis Knight	Dennis Knight; Mideon; Phineas I. Godwinn	1996–2001	
Kenta Kobayashi	Hideo Itami	2014–2019	
Metehan Kocabaşoğlu	Teoman	2021–2022	
Marianna Komlos ^{†}	Marianna; Mrs. Cleavage	1999	
Demetrius Korderas	Jim Korderas; Jimmy Korderas	1987-2009	
Matthew Korklan	Matt Sydal; Evan Bourne	2007–2014	
Jack Korpela	Jack Korpela	2006–2011	
Dick Kroll	Dick Kroll	1960-1985	
Stephen Kupryk	Steve Cutler	2014-2021	
Yujiro Kushida	Kushida	2019–2022	
Ernest Ladd ^{†}	"Big Cat" Ernie Ladd "King"	1964; 1968–1970; 1972; 1975–1976; 1978; 1980–1981	
Pierre Lafleur^{†}	Yukon Pierre	1978	
Philippe Lafon	Phil Lafon	1996–1997	
Chad Lail	Chad Lail; Jaxson Ryker	2017–2021	
Michel Lamarche ^{†}	Alexis Smirnoff	1983–1984	
Alyssa Lane	Kayden Carter; Lacey Lane	2018-2025	
Wallace Lane	Stan Lane	1993–1995	
John Lanza ^{†}	Blackjack Lanza	1973; 1975	
Vickie Lara	Vickie Guerrero	2005–2014	
Thomas Laughlin	Tommy Dreamer	1997; 2001-2003; 2005; 2006-2010; 2015	
Cyndi Lauper	Cyndi Lauper	1984–1985	
Joan Laurer ^{†}	Chyna	1997–2001	
Michael Lauri	Michael Lauri	2012–2020	
John Laurinaitis	John Laurinaitis/Big Johnny	2001-2022	
Joseph Laurinaitis ^{†}	Animal; The Road Warrior; Road Warrior Animal	1990-1992; 1997-1999; 2003; 2005-2006; 2012	
Brian Lawler ^{†}	Brian Christopher; Grand Master Sexay	1997–2001; 2004	
Jerry Lawler	Jerry "The King" Lawler	1992–2001; 2001–2024	
Andrew Leavine	Andy Leavine; Kevin Hackman	2010–2012	
Keith Lee	Bearcat Lee; Keith Lee; Keith "Bearcat" Lee	2018–2021	
Peggy Lee^{†}	Peggy Lee	1984–1985	
Sara Lee^{†}	Sara Lee	2015-2016	
Rodney Leinhardt	Rodney	1999–2001	
Raymond Leppan	Leo Kruger; Adam Rose	2010–2016	
Edward Leslie	Brutus "The Barber" Beefcake	1984–1990; 1991–1993	
Brock Lesnar	Brock Lesnar	2000–2004; 2012–2020; 2021–2024; 2025–2026	
Seth Lesser	Simon Gotch	2013–2017	
Scott Levy	Johnny Polo; Raven	1993–1994; 2000–2003	
Donn Lewin^{†}	Donn Lewin	1958–1963; 1969	
Mark Lewin	Mark Lewin	1959	
Theodore Lewin^{†}	Ted Lewin	1963–1968	
Steven Lewington	DJ Gabriel; Steve Lewington	2005–2010	
Ray Liccachelli	Doink the Clown (#2); Ray Liccachelli	1993–1995	
Reginald Lisowski ^{†}	The Crusher; Crusher Machine	1963; 1986	
Thomas Lister Jr. ^{†}	Zeus	1989	
Phillip Lloyd	Justin Gabriel	2008–2015	
Michael Lockwood ^{†}	Crash; Crash Holly; Erin O'Grady	1998–2003	
Rochelle Loewen	Rochelle Loewen	2004–2005	
Vito LoGrasso	Vito; Skull Von Krush	1993; 2005–2007	
Steven Lombardi	Abe Schwartz; Doink the Clown; Kim Chee; Most Valuable Player; Kangaroo; Boston Brawler; Steve Lombardi; The Brooklyn Brawler	1983–2016	
Joshua Lomberger	Josh Matthews; Josh Mathews	2002–2014	
Mark LoMonaco	Bubba Ray Dudley; Buh Buh Ray Dudley	1997; 1999-2005; 2015-2016	
Paul London	Paul London	2003-2008	
Theodore Long	Theodore Long	1998–2014	
Gerson Lopez	Mascarita Sagrada; Mini Nova	1997-1999; 2005-2006	
Marc Loyd	Marc Loyd	2002–2005	
Martin Lunde	Arn Anderson	1988–1989; 2001–2019	
John Lutz ‡	Jack Lutz	1950s–1967	
Cynthia Lynch	Bobcat	1999–2000	
Jeremy Lynn	Jerry Lynn	1997; 2001–2002	
Roman Macek	Luca Crusifino	2022–2026	
Evan T. Mack	Evan T. Mack	2019–2021	
Damian Mackle	Big Damo; Damo; Killian Dain	2016–2021	
Kira Magnin-Forster	Franky Monet	2021	
Brian Mailhot	Palmer Cannon	2005-2006	
Robert Maillet	Kurrgan; The Interrogator	1997–1999	
Fanene Maivia ^{†}	Peter Maivia	1977–1981	
J.J. Maguire ^{†}	J.J. Maguire	1987–1993	
Bill Malone ^{†}	Bill Malone	1956–1972	
James Manley	Jim Powers	1984–1994	
Trevor Mann	Ricochet	2018–2024	
Michael Manna	Big Stevie Cool; Steven Richards; Stevie Richards	1997; 1999-2008	
Spiros Manousakis	Spiros Arion	1966–1967; 1974–1975; 1977–1978	
Greg Marasciulo	Trent Barreta	2010-2013	
Mario Mancini	Mario Mancini	1984–1992	
Joseph Marella ^{‡}	Joey Marella	1983-1994	
Robert Marella ^{‡}	Gorilla Monsoon	1959–1999	
Tomas Marin	Tomas Marin	1960s–1970s	
James Maritato	Little Guido; Nunzio	1997; 2002-2008; 2010-2011	
Pablo Marquez	Babu; Pablo Marquez	1997–1999	
Daniel Marsh	Dan Marsh; Danny Davis; Mr X	1985–1995	
Debra Marshall	Debra	1998–2002	
Kristal Marshall	Kristal; Kristal Marshall	2005-2007	
Andrew Martin ^{†}	Test	1998-2004; 2006-2007	
Patrick Martin	Alex Shelley	2024–2026	
Troy Martin	Dean Douglas; Shane Douglas; Troy Martin	1986; 1990–1991; 1995	
Anthony Martinelli ^{†}	Tony Martinelli	1953–1963	
Shelly Martinez	Ariel	2005–2007	
Salvatore Martino ^{†}	Salvatore Bellomo	1982–1987	
Ashley Massaro ^{†}	Ashley; Ashley Massaro	2005–2008	
Thomas Matera	Antonio	2005-2006	
Jerry Matthews ^{†}	Dr. Jerry Graham	1963–1965	
Jeannine Mjoseth	Mad Maxine	1985	
Lauren Mayhew	Lauren Mayhew	2009	
Michelle McCool	Michelle McCool	2004–2011	
Edward McDaniel ^{†}	Wahoo McDaniel	1965	
Richard McGraw ^{‡}	Quickdraw McGraw; Rick McGraw	1980-1982; 1984-1985	
Michelle McGuirk	Mike McGuirk	1987–1993	
Joseph McHugh ^{†}	Joe McHugh	1964–1984	
Cassandra McIntosh	Cassie; KC Cassidie; Peyton Royce	2015–2021	
Velvet McIntyre	Velvet McIntyre	1983-1990	
Jessica McKay	Billie Kay; Jessie	2015–2021	
Marissa Mazzola-McMahon	Marissa Mazzola-McMahon	1999–2001	
Roderick McMahon ^{‡}	Jess McMahon	1953–1954	
Vincent James McMahon ^{†}	Vincent J. McMahon	1954–1982	
Vincent Kennedy McMahon	Vince McMahon	1969–2024	
Shane McMahon	Shane McMahon	1988–2009; 2016–2024	
Lance McNaught ^{†}	Garrison Cade; Lance Cade	2003–2008; 2010	
Danny McShain ^{†}	Danny McShain	1953–1963	
Luke Menzies	Ridge Holland	2018–2025	
Bob Merrill	The Golden Terror	1953–???? 1968; 1982	
Marc Mero	Marc Mero	1996–1999	
Tamyra Mensah-Stock	Tyra Mae Steele	2023–2026	
Debrah Miceli	Alundra Blayze	1993–1995	
Linda Miles	Linda Miles; Shaniqua	2002–2004	
Tehuti Miles	Ashante "Thee" Adonis	2020–2021; 2022–2025	
Dylan Miley	Lars Sullivan	2013–2021	
Edward Miller	Ed Miller	1950s	
Freddie Miller ^{†}	Freddie Miller	1984–1985	
William Miller ^{†}	Dr. Bill Miller	1965–1972	
Ernest Miller	Ernest "The Cat" Miller	2002–2004	
Heath Miller	Heath Slater	2006–2020	
Robert Miller ^{†}	Bushwhacker Butch	1988–1996	
Craig Minervini	Craig DeGeorge	1986–1989	
David Minton	Dave Mastiff	2018–2022	
John Minton ^{†}	Big John Studd; Executioner #2; Chuck O'Connor	1972; 1976–1977; 1983–1986; 1989	
McKenzie Mitchell	McKenzie Mitchell	2019–2023	
Nicholas Mitchell	Mitch	2004–2007	
Danielle Moinet	Summer Rae	2011–2017	
Carlos Moises	Max Moon; Latin Fury	1992–1993	
Joseph Mondt ^{‡}	Toots Mondt	1953–1976	
William Moody ^{‡}	Paul Bearer	1990–2002; 2003–2005; 2010–2013	
Sean Mooney	Sean Mooney	1988–1993	
Carlene Moore	Jazz	2001–2004; 2006–2007	
Jacqueline Moore	Ms. Jackie Moore; Jacqueline	1993; 1998–2004	
Shannon Moore	Shannon Moore	2002–2005; 2006–2008	
Pedro Morales ^{†}	Pedro Morales	1959; 1963–1964; 1970–1974; 1980–1982; 1986–1987	
Christopher Mordetzky	Chris Masters	2004–2007; 2009–2011	
Lisa Moretti	Ivory	1999–2005	
Heidi Morgan	Heidi Lee Morgan	1993–1994	
Matthew Morgan	Matt Morgan	2002–2005	
Raymond Morgan ^{†}	Ray Morgan	1958–1971	
Sean Morley	The Big Valbowski; Chief Morley; Val Venis; Sean Morley	1998–2009	
Daniel Morrison	Danny Doring	2005; 2006	
Richard Morton	Ricky Morton	1993; 1998	
Caryn Mower	Muffy Mower	2000	
Louis Mucciolo Jr. ^{†}	Louie Spicolli; Rad Radford	1988–1994; 1995–1996	
William Mueller	Trevor Murdoch	2005–2008	
Dean Muhtadi	Mojo Rawley	2012–2021	
Beverly Mullins	Courtney Taylor	2009–2010	
Donald Muraco	Don Muraco; The Magnificent Muraco	1981–1988	
Masanori Murakawa	The Great Sasuke	1997	
George Murdoch	G-Rilla; Brodus Clay	2006–2008; 2010–2014	
Hoyt Murdoch ^{†}	Dick Murdoch	1984–1985	
John Murphy ^{†}	Skull Murphy	1962–1964	
Russell Murray	Rory McAllister	2005–2008	
Simon Musk	Ligero	2018-2020	
Brian Myers	Brian Major; Curt Hawkins	2006–2014; 2016–2020	
William Myers ^{†}	George "The Animal" Steele	1968–1970; 1972; 1976; 1984–1988; 1998–1999	
James Ellsworth Morris	James Ellsworth	2016–2017; 2018	

== See also ==
- List of WWE personnel
