= Chief Little Eagle =

American professional wrestler (1935–1990)

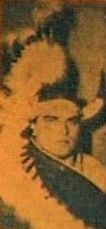
- Little Eagle in 1963

Personal information
- Born: Richard Thomas Bryant; March 21, 1935 Irving, Texas, U.S.
- Died: July 7, 1990 (aged 55) Dallas, Texas, U.S.
- Cause of death: Murder

Professional wrestling career
- Ring name(s): Chief Little Eagle; Dick Bryant
- Billed height: 6 ft 0 in (1.83 m)
- Billed weight: 230 lb (100 kg)
- Billed from: Stillwater, Oklahoma
- Debut: 1954
- Retired: 1974

Richard Thomas Bryant (March 21, 1935 – July 7, 1990), better known by his ring name Chief Little Eagle, was an American professional wrestler. He prominently competed in the Georgia, Dallas, and Tri-State territories of the National Wrestling Alliance (NWA). He was a multi-time tag team champion, having won various tag team championships throughout the 50s and 60s, alongside long time partner Chief Big Heart.

== Professional wrestling career ==
Bryant started wrestling early in his career under the name Dick Bryant. He competed for various NWA territories and portrayed the gimmick of Chief Little Eagle, a Cherokee tribe member. In 1959, he worked for Atlanta-based promotion Georgia Championship Wrestling, and would form a tag team with Chief Big Heart. On April 7, 1959, Little Eagle and Big Heart defeated Andre Bollet and Frank Valois to win the NWA Texas Tag Team Championship. They dropped the titles to Ben and Mike Sharpe just a week later. During this period, they feuded with the likes of the Golden Grahams (Jerry and Eddie), the Tolos Brothers (Chris Tolos and John Tolos) and Johnny Valentine. Little Eagle won his first singles title, the NWA Southeastern Heavyweight Championship, on September 20, 1961, defeating Dick Dunn. He held the championship until October 6, when he lost it to Greg Peterson.

In February 1961, he briefly won the NWA Georgia Southern Heavyweight Championship under unknown circumstances, but quickly lost it back to Skull Murphy. Eagle was said to have beaten Murphy for the title, but it was not accepted anywhere, and thus he was not considered an official champion. On April 11, he and Murphy had a match in Macon, Georgia to decide who was the real champion, which Murphy won, gaining statewide recognition. After this loss, Eagle returned to GCW, serving as a top booker under former wrestler and promoter Ray Gunkel. On April 27, 1963, he teamed with Dick Steinborn, defeating Lenny Montana and Tarzan Tyler for the NWA (Georgia) World Tag Team Championship. Eagle and Steinborn dropped the titles back to Montana and Tyler in June. That same month, he teamed with Bill Dromo to win back the titles, before losing them to Gunkel and Steinborn.

After this, Eagle reunited with Big Heart, winning the Georgia version of the NWA World Tag Team Championship from Tyler and Montana at the Municipal Auditorium on November 2, 1963. The team of Chief and Eagle lost the titles under unknown circumstances, after which the titles were next seen with The Von Brauners. Big Heart left for NWA Tri-State, so Eagle teamed with another American wrestler with a Native American gimmick, Chief Jay Strongbow (then wrestling under his real name), defeating The Corsicans (Corsica Jean & Corsica Joe) for the NWA Southern Tag Team Championship on June 4, 1965. They lost the titles to Al and Mario Galento a week later. Eagle went back to Gulf Coast Championship Wrestling, where on April 6, 1966, he defeated Eduardo Perez for the NWA Gulf Coast Heavyweight Championship until dropping it to Ramon Torres in July.

During this time, Eagle had a series of matches with Dick the Bruiser. He also faced other popular heels such as Skaandor Akbar, The Assassins and Luke Graham. He continued to wrestle for the Atlanta territory until 1972, when he was injured at a house show by the Assassins, forcing him into temporary retirement. On November 5, 1974, Eagle, who had briefly returned to wrestle for the All-South Wrestling Alliance, teamed with Chief Bold Eagle to win the ASWA Georgia Tag Team Championship, before losing it a week later to The Royal Kangaroos.

== Death ==
Following his retirement from wrestling, he worked for an oil company. On July 7, 1990, Bryant took in a homeless man by the name of Dolph Adams. However, Adams took out a gun and shot Bryant, which, according to the police, severed his spinal cord and pierced his heart, killing him in the process. Adams would eventually be convicted of murder and was arrested.

== Championships and accomplishment ==
- Gulf Coast Championship Wrestling
  - NWA Gulf Coast Heavyweight Championship (2 times)
  - Panama City Heavyweight Championship (1 time)
- World Class Wrestling Association
  - WCWA Texas Tag Team Championship (1 time) – with Chief Big Heart
- Georgia Championship Wrestling
  - NWA Georgia Heavyweight Championship (1 time)
  - NWA International Tag Team Championship (Georgia version) (2 times) – with Dick Steinborn (1) and Bill Dromo (1)
  - NWA World Tag Team Championship (Georgia version) (1 time) – with Chief Big Heart
  - NWA Southern Tag Team Championship (Georgia version) (1 time) – with Chief Jay Strongbow
- All-South Wrestling Association
  - ASWA Georgia Tag Team Championship (1 time) – with Chief Bold Eagle
