= Chief Big Heart =

American professional wrestler (1927–1993)

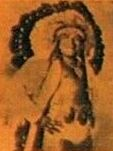

Personal information
- Born: Richard Gilbert Vest Sr. 5 March 1927 Pawhuska, Oklahoma, U.S.
- Died: 22 April 1993 (aged 66) Palm Springs, California

Professional wrestling career
- Ring name(s): Chief Big Heart; Chief Dick Vest; Chief Vest; Hank Vest
- Billed height: 6 ft 3 in (1.91 m)
- Billed weight: 242 lb (110 kg)
- Billed from: Pawhuska, Oklahoma
- Debut: 1951
- Retired: 1975

Richard Gilbert Vest Sr. (March 5, 1927 – April 22, 1993) was an American professional wrestler best known by the ring name Chief Big Heart. A popular TV wrestling star of the 1950s, Vest won championships in numerous National Wrestling Alliance territories between 1956 and 1963. His famous "bow and arrow" submission hold was a feared finishing maneuver in professional wrestling. Vest's battles with Dr. Jerry Graham in Georgia Championship Wrestling were among the promotion's biggest drawing cards of the era and regarded as one of the bloodiest feuds in pro wrestling history. He was also well-known for his work in tag teams with fellow Native American wrestlers, especially Chief Little Eagle and Kit Fox, winning tag team titles in the NWA's Dallas, Georgia, and Tri-State territories. He also worked with a number of other tag team partners, including Johnny Weaver, Abe Jacobs, Red McIntyre, and Haystacks Calhoun.

In his 24-year career, Vest wrestled for extended periods of time for various wrestling promotions: the American Wrestling Alliance, Capitol Wrestling Corporation, Championship Wrestling From Florida, International Wrestling Association, Jim Crockett Promotions, Kola Kwariani Booking Office, Maple Leaf Wrestling, Stampede Wrestling, St. Louis Wrestling Club, Western States Sports and Worldwide Wrestling Associates. He also made touring appearances overseas for Japan Pro Wrestling Alliance and Stadiums Limited.

== Early life ==
Vest was born on March 5, 1927, in Pawhuska, Oklahoma, United States and attended Carlisle Indian School. He enlisted in the United States Navy during World War II and served on both the USS San Juan and USS Tawasa before being discharged in July 1946.

== Professional career ==
During the early 1950s, Vest decided to become a pro wrestler and made his debut in 1951 in Texas. He wrestled his first match as Chief Vest against Billy Weidner at an Amarillo house show in April 1951. This match was a time limit draw. Soon after that, he moved to the St. Louis territory of the NWA and had a series of matches with the St. Louis Wrestling Club in November 1951. Within a year, Vest was headlining shows at Brock Arena in the NWA's Toronto wrestling territory. He also began appearing for Stampede Wrestling, and was Bret Hart's first favorite wrestler, according to Bret himself.

After this, he moved to the Georgia territory where he went on to form a team with Red McIntyre. They went on to win the NWA International Tag Team championship with McIntyre on December 7, 1956, by defeating inaugural champions Ike Eakens and Fred Atkins. That same year, Vest defeated NWA North American Champion Danny McShain during a tour of Australia, however, it is unclear which version of the title was on the line.

During this same time Vest also won his first singles championship in January 1957 when he defeated Dr Jerry Graham for the NWA Southern Heavyweight Championship. He lost the title a week later back to Graham. In the meantime, McIntyre and Chief went on to hold the championship for two months until they dropped it to Mark Lewin and Don Lewin in February. After this Chief had a series of matches with Jerry Graham and subsequently went back to the Texas territory in the World Class Wrestling Association operated by Southwest Sports. There he went on to form a Tag Team with Chief Little Eagle. Their gimmick was of Cherokee chiefs. They went on to win the NWA Texas TagTeam Championship from the team of Andre Bollet & Frank Valois on April 7, 1959, at a show in Dallas, Texas. They lost the title a week later to Ben And Mike Sharpe. During this period the team of Big Heart and Little Eagle feuded with the likes of Golden Grahams (Jerry and Eddie), the Tolos Brothers (Chris Tolos and John Tolos) and Johnny Valentine. In 1960 he teamed up with Johnny Valentine to defend the WWWF United States Tag-Team Championship when Johhny's partner Buddy Rogers left WWWF. They subsequently lost the titles to the Fabulous Kangaroos. During this time Chief Big Heart wrestled extensively for Capital Wrestling Corporation, NWA's Northeast territory and the precursor to WWWF and subsequently WWF/E. He faced the team of Bill Watts and Bill Miller while teaming up with the then WWE champion Bruno Sammartino which ended in a draw.

After this, he continued to feud with his old rival Jerry Graham and unsuccessfully challenged him and Eddie Graham for the WWWF United States Tag Team Championship along with first Chief Little Eagle and then Haystacks Calhoun. He formed a team with Red Bastien to challenge the champions Jerry Graham and Johnny Valentine but was again unsuccessful in winning the title. After failing to beat Jerry for the championship he set his eyes on Georgia and left the northeast territory in 1963.

He returned to Georgia Championship Wrestling in 1963 along with Little Eagle, where he went on to win the NWA World Tag Team Championship (Georgia version) when they defeated Tarzan Tyler and Lenny Montana for the titles at Municipal Auditorium in a November house show. They held the championship for about a month, until January 1964. The team of Chief and Eagle lost the titles under unknown circumstances, after which the titles were next seen with The Von Brauners. After this, he returned to the WWWF. Then later for NWA Big-time Wrestling and NWA Tri-State. He also made a new tag team with another Native American gimmick wrestler, Chief Kit Fox. He won the NWA Tri-state Tagteam Championship along with Kit Fox by defeating the team of Karl Von Stroheim & Treach Phillips in January 1969. They dropped the titles back to them in February. Around this time, he and Kit fox were involved in a car accident which ultimately ended both their careers.

After this Chief wrestled sporadically for NWA. His last-known match was at a Northwest Wrestling Promotions event in Hope, British Columbia, on September 4, 1975, teaming with Tiger Jeet Singh and Dennis Stamp in a six-man elimination match against Seigfried Steinke, Professor Lewis and Masa Saito. Vest later worked as a special security officer in Las Vegas, Nevada. He was briefly involved in Eddie Faieta's short-lived outlaw group based at the Showboat Casino in 1981, and occasionally worked on local wrestling shows as a referee into the early-1980s. He died from complications of diabetes at Desert Hospital in Palm Springs, California on April 22, 1993, at age 66. Vest was survived by his wife Terri and an aunt. Vest was interred at Arlington National Cemetery in Washington, DC.

== Championships and accomplishments ==
- Big Time Wrestling
  - NWA Texas Tag Team Championship (1 time) – with Chief Little Eagle
- Georgia Championship Wrestling
  - NWA Southern Heavyweight Championship (Georgia version) (1 time)
  - NWA International Tag Team Championship (Georgia version) (1 time) – with Red McIntyre
  - NWA World Tag Team Championship (Georgia version) (1 time) – with Chief Little Eagle
- NWA Tri-State
  - NWA Tri-State Tag Team Championship (1 time) – with Chief Kit Fox
- Stadiums Limited
  - NWA North American Championship (Australian version) (1 time)
