= Ted Lewin =

American illustrator and children's book writer (1935–2021)

- Born: Ted B. Lewin; May 6, 1935 Buffalo, New York, U.S.
- Died: July 28, 2021 (aged 86)
- Occupation: Children's illustrator and writer
- Period: 1988–2021

Theodore Peter Lewin (May 6, 1935 – July 28, 2021) known as Ted Lewin, was an American illustrator and writer of children's books. Lewin illustrated more than 200 books for children and young adults, including the 1994 Caldecott Medal winner, Peppe the Lamplighter by Elisa Bartone. Many of Lewin's books were collaborations with his wife, Betsy Lewin, and drew from their exotic travels to places including the Amazon River, Botswana, Egypt, Lapland, the Sahara Desert, and India.

== Biography ==
Ted Lewin was born in Buffalo, New York on May 6, 1935. He has one sister and two brothers, Donn and Mark, who were both professional wrestlers. Lewin grew up in a household with exotic pets, including an iguana, a rhesus monkey, a chimpanzee, and a lion, During his youth, Lewin developed a drawing hobby by sketching his pets and copying works of established illustrators and painters that interested him. He refined his art talents at Lafayette High School, and graduated in 1952. He earned a BFA degree in 1956 from Pratt Institute of Art in Brooklyn, where he met his wife, Betsy Reilly.

=== Wrestling ===
To finance his education at Pratt, Lewin pursued a part-time career as a teenage professional wrestler alongside his brothers. His wrestling career lasted for 26 years, and was the basis of his 1993 memoir I Was a Teenaged Professional Wrestler. He wrestled mainly in the World Wide Wrestling Federation from 1963 to 1968.

=== Writing ===
In 1994, a Caldecott Medal was awarded to Peppe the Lamplighter, a picture book written by Elisa Barone and illustrated by Lewin.

In 2006, One Green Apple, illustrated by Lewin and written by Eve Bunting, won the inaugural Arab American Book Award for books written for Children/Young Adults. One Green Apple tells the story of a young girl who has just immigrated to America from an Arab country and her discovery that her differences are what makes her special.

== Exhibitions ==
- "Ted and Betsy Lewin's World of Picture Books", Brooklyn Public Library, New York, March 4–30, 2004
- "Adventures With Ted and Betsy", Society of Illustrators main floor gallery, June 1 through June 11, 2005
- "Travels with Ted and Betsy Lewin", Children's Museum of Manhattan, New York
- "Around the World with Ted and Betsy Lewin", Pratt Institute Libraries, October 30 - December 2, 2008

== Awards ==
- 1994: National Jewish Book Award in the Children's Picture Book category for illustrating The Always Prayer Shawl

== Championships and accomplishments ==
- Cauliflower Alley Club
- Art Abrams Lifetime Achievement Award (2001)

== See also ==
- List of Jewish professional wrestlers
