= Donn Lewin =

American professional wrestler (1926–2010)

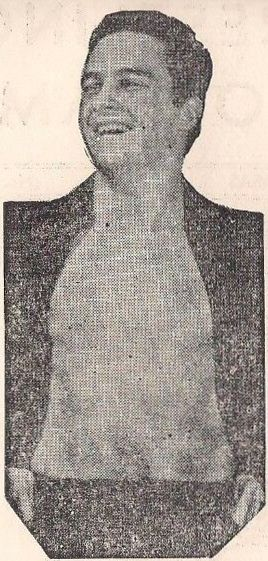
- Lewin, c. 1951

Personal information
- Born: April 1, 1926 Buffalo, New York, U.S.
- Died: December 18, 2010 (aged 84) Hawaii, U.S.
- Family: Mark Lewin (brother); Danny McShain (brother-in-law)

Professional wrestling career
- Ring name(s): Donn Lewin; The Executioner
- Billed height: 6 ft 0 in (183 cm)
- Billed weight: 229 lb (104 kg)
- Trained by: Jim Henry
- Debut: 1951
- Military service
- Branch: United States Marine Corps
- Rank: Sergeant
- Conflicts: World War II (Pacific Theater)
- Awards: Three Purple Hearts

Donn Lewin (April 1, 1926 – December 18, 2010) was an American professional wrestler, marine and tropical fish breeder.

== Early life ==
Lewin was born on April 1, 1926, and grew up in Buffalo, New York, where he attended Lafayette High School.

== Military career ==
Lewin left school at age 15 to join the Marines and serve in World War II. He fought at Iwo Jima, Guadalcanal, and Guam, and left the Marines after attaining the rank of sergeant, finally serving as an admiral's orderly. During his time in the service, he earned three Purple Hearts for wounds suffered in battle. After leaving the Marines, Lewin became interested in bodybuilding, and he placed second in a Mr. Niagara Frontier Contest.

== Professional wrestling career ==
His placement in the bodybuilding contest brought him to the attention of Ed Don George, a promoter. George introduced him to Jim Henry, who trained Lewin. At the beginning of his wrestling career, Lewin competed in Buffalo, New York and across the border in Ontario, as well as Capitol Wrestling. While competing for Capitol Wrestling in Maryland, he teamed with his real-life brother Mark Lewin to win the American Tag Team Championship. Lewin also competed in California, Ohio, and Georgia. In Georgia, he teamed with his brother Mark again to win the Georgia version of the NWA International Tag Team Championship.

In 1969, a promoter asked Lewin to begin wearing a mask and competing as The Executioner. He used the identity while competing in several promotions. During that time period, Lewin also helped train Greg Valentine as a professional wrestler.

In addition to wrestling, Lewin also worked as a fish breeder for several years. Eventually, he decided to retire from wrestling and focus on his second career, which had grown to include not only pet fish, but also piranhas and alligators.

== Personal life ==
Lewin's brothers Mark and Ted also became professional wrestlers. He also has a sister named Sallee. Sallee began dating professional wrestler Danny McShain shortly after McShain broke Lewin's nose; the couple was later married and were together until McShain's death in 1992. Due to wrestling, he required more than 30 operations throughout his life, including several hip replacements.

== Death ==
Lewin died on December 18, 2010, at the age of 84 in Hawaii.

== Championships and accomplishments ==
- Capitol Wrestling Corporation
  - American Tag Team Championship (2 times) - with Mark Lewin
- Georgia Championship Wrestling
  - NWA International Tag Team Championship (Georgia version) (1 time) - with Mark Lewin

== See also ==
- List of Jewish professional wrestlers
