= Mark Lewin =

American professional wrestler (born 1937)

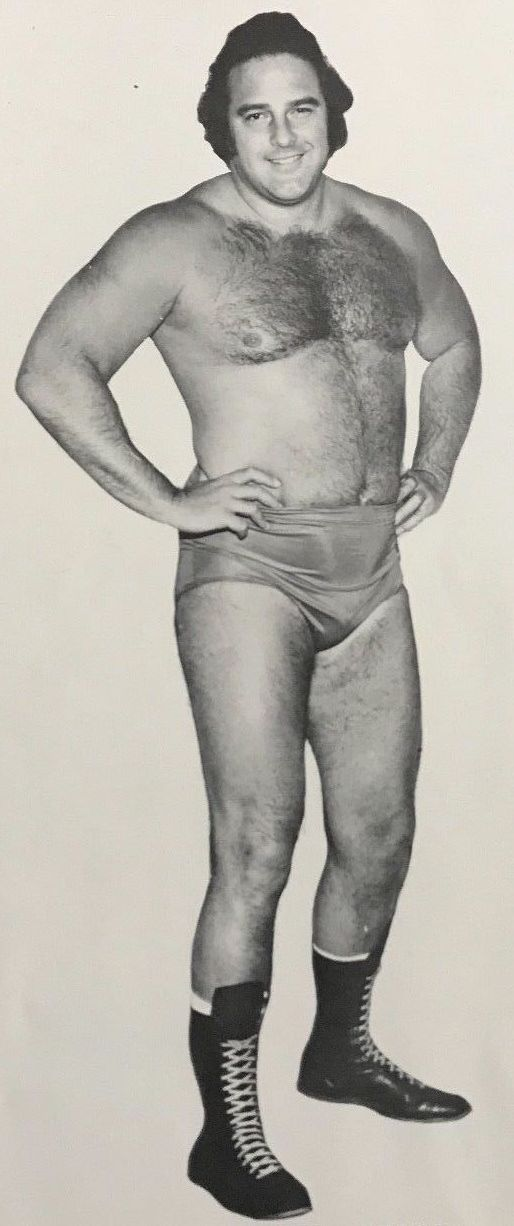
- Lewin in 1960

Personal information
- Born: March 16, 1937 (age 89) Buffalo, New York, U.S.
- Family: Donn Lewin (brother); Ted Lewin (brother); Danny McShain (brother-in-law)

Professional wrestling career
- Ring name(s): Mark Lewin; The Purple Haze; Skippy Jackson
- Billed height: 6 ft 1 in (185 cm)
- Billed weight: 265 lb (120 kg)
- Trained by: John Horton; Danny McShain
- Debut: 1953
- Retired: 1988

Mark Lewin (born March 16, 1937) is an American retired professional wrestler. He worked for various promotions throughout his 35-year career, including Big Time Wrestling (Detroit), Championship Wrestling from Florida, Houston Wrestling, World Championship Wrestling (Australia), and the Capitol Wrestling Corporation (the predecessor of what is now known as WWE).

== Early life ==
Lewin was born in Buffalo, New York. He had two elder brothers, Donn and Ted, both of whom also became professional wrestlers. He attended Lafayette High School.

== Professional wrestling career ==
Lewin was trained to wrestle by his brother-in-law, Danny McShain. He debuted in 1953 at the age of 16.

Lewin had great early success in a matinee-idol babyface tag team with Don Curtis, headlining in major territories like New York and Chicago. The team's brief heel turn was a shock to its many fans. The team split up in the early '60s and Mark embarked on a singles career.

In 1963, Mark first tried out the "Maniac"/"Mad" Mark Lewin persona, which he would alternate consistently with his 'normal' babyface persona for the rest of his career. He wrestled in Australia and New Zealand in the 1960s and 1970s with great success, especially in New Zealand where he drew huge crowds during the tours. He frequently formed a tag team in Australia and New Zealand with King Curtis Iaukea. He also spent time in Detroit working against The Sheik and fellow wildman, Terry Funk. Lewin also wrestled in Vancouver with NWA All Star Wrestling, where he feuded with the likes of Gene Kiniski and "Bulldog" Bob Brown and twice won the Pacific Coast Heavyweight title.

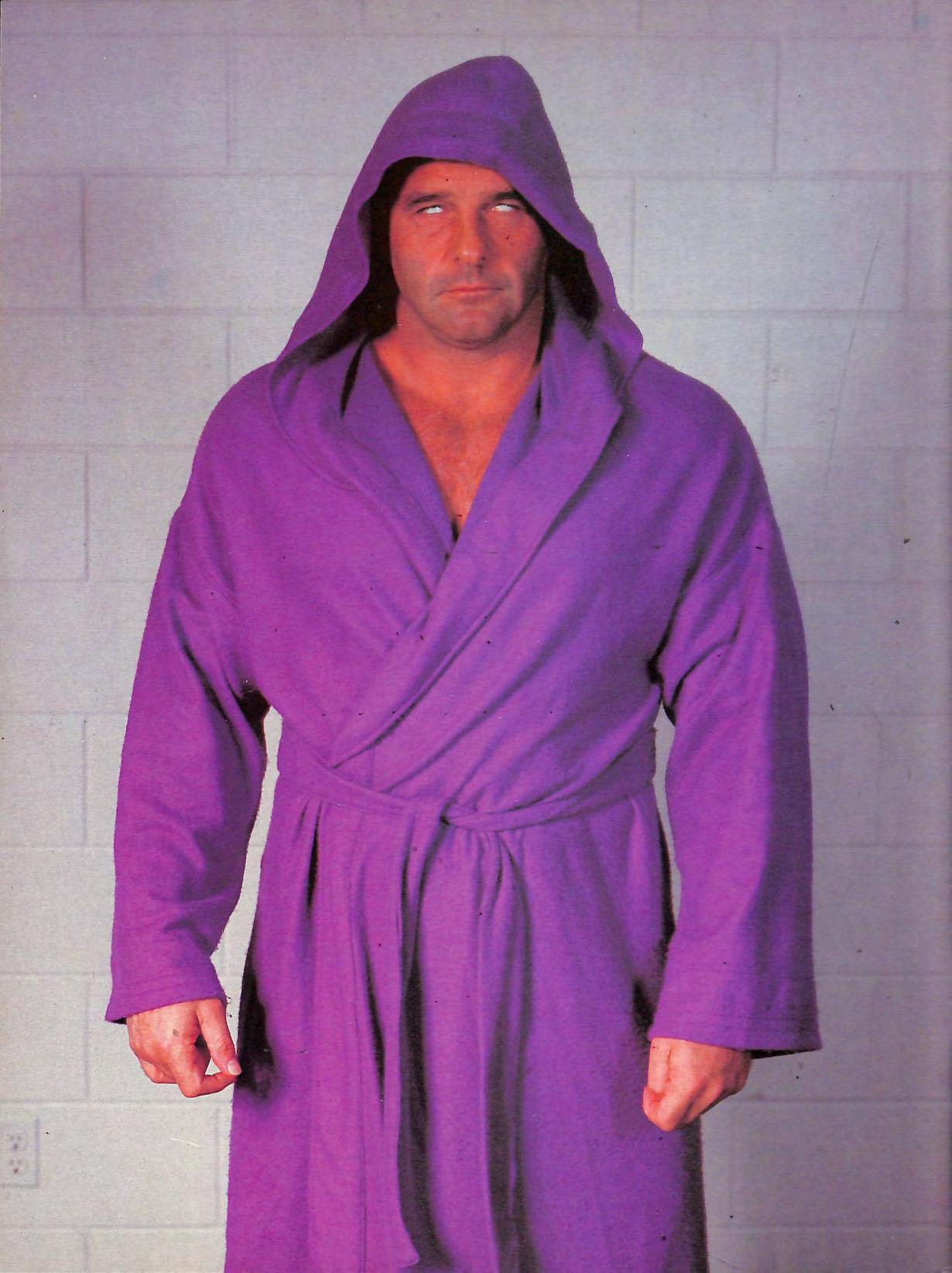
Lewin as Purple Haze in 1983

He found a lot of success in World Class Championship Wrestling in the late 1970s and early 1980s before going to Florida Championship Wrestling, where he joined Kevin Sullivan's "cult" as The Purple Haze, another variation of the 'Maniac' gimmick. Lewin competed at Starrcade '83: A Flare for the Gold in November 1983; he and Kevin Sullivan won their match.

Lewin worked as a booker for Jim Barnett in Australia.

He was one of Sabu's frequent opponents in the 1980s.

Lewin retired in 1988, but came back mid 2003 to work for Eddie Jr. and Thomas Farhat to start up All World Wrestling League/Big Time Wrestling.

== Championships and accomplishments ==
- All-Star Pro Wrestling
  - NWA Australasian Tag Team Championship (3 times) - with Steve Rickard (1), Al Perez (1), and Spiros Arion (1)
- Big Time Wrestling
  - NWA United States Heavyweight Championship (Detroit version) (2 times)
- Capitol Wrestling Corporation
  - NWA United States Tag Team Championship (Northeast version) (2 times, inaugural) - with Don Curtis
- Championship Wrestling from Florida
  - NWA Southern Heavyweight Championship (Florida version) (1 time)
- Georgia Championship Wrestling
  - NWA International Tag Team Championship (Georgia version) (1 time) - with Donn Lewin
- Maple Leaf Wrestling
  - NWA International Tag Team Championship (Toronto version) (1 time) - with Whipper Billy Watson
- NWA All-Star Wrestling
  - NWA Canadian Tag Team Championship (Vancouver version) (1 time) - with Steven Little Bear
  - NWA Pacific Coast Heavyweight Championship (Vancouver version) (2 times)
- NWA Hollywood Wrestling
  - WWA Americas Heavyweight Championship (1 time)
  - WWA World Heavyweight Championship (1 time)
- NWA Big Time Wrestling / World Class Championship Wrestling
  - NWA American Tag Team Championship (2 times) - with The Spoiler
  - NWA Brass Knuckles Championship (Texas version) (8 times)
  - NWA Texas Heavyweight Championship (3 times)
  - NWA Texas Tag Team Championship (1 time) - with Dick Steinborn
  - NWA World Six-Man Tag Team Championship (Texas version) (1 time) - with Killer Tim Brooks & One Man Gang
- Pro Wrestling Illustrated
  - PWI ranked him # 265 of the 500 best singles wrestlers during the "PWI Years" in 2003.
- Professional Wrestling Hall of Fame and Museum
  - (Class of 2009) - with Don Curtis
- World Championship Wrestling (Australia)
  - IWA World Heavyweight Championship (2 times)
  - IWA World Tag Team Championship (8 times) - with King Curtis Iaukea (2), Bearcat Wright (1), Dominic DeNucci (1), Spiros Arion (1), Mario Milano, (1), Killer Kowalski (1) and Antonio Pugliese (1)
  - NWA Austra-Asian Tag Team Championship (1 time) - with Spiros Arion
- Wrestling Observer Newsletter
  - Wrestling Observer Newsletter Hall of Fame (Class of 2017)

^{1}This World Championship Wrestling was an NWA affiliated promotion based in Australia that operated from the mid-1960s to the early-1990s. It is not the same promotion as the World Championship Wrestling that was once owned by Ted Turner and sold to World Wrestling Entertainment in 2001.

== See also ==
- List of Jewish professional wrestlers
