= NWA International Tag Team Championship (Georgia version) =

Professional wrestling championship

Details
- Promotion: Georgia Championship Wrestling
- Date established: October 1956
- Date retired: No later than June 1963
Statistics
- First champions: Fred Atkins and Ike Eakins
- Final champions: Ray Gunkel and Dick Steinborn
- Most reigns: Don McIntyre and Red McIntyre (2); Freddie Blassie and Bob Shipp (2); Ray Gunkel and Don McIntyre (2); Ray Gunkel and Dick Steinborn (2); Tarzan Tyler and Len Montana (2)
- Longest reign: Ray Gunkel and Ron Etchison (63 days)
- Shortest reign: Karl Heinkler and Kurt Von Brauner (7 days)

The NWA International Tag Team Championship was a professional wrestling tag team championship in Georgia Championship Wrestling (GCW). A secondary title after the NWA World Tag Team Championship (Georgia version), it was one of several international tag team championships recognized by the National Wrestling Alliance. It was the first NWA tag team championship to be billed as an "international" title and active from 1956 to 1963.

Some reigns were held by champions using a ring name, while others used their real name. There have been a total of 34 recognized individual champions and 23 recognized teams, who have had a combined 28 official reigns. The first champions were Fred Atkins and Ike Eakins, and the final champions were Ray Gunkel and Dick Steinborn. At 63 days, Ray Gunkel and Ron Etchison's first and only reign was the longest, while the team of Karl Heinkler and Kurt Von Brauner's reign was the shortest, at seven days.

Five teams - Don McIntyre and Red McIntyre, Freddie Blassie and Bob Shipp, Ray Gunkel and Don McIntyre, Ray Gunkel and Dick Steinborn, and Tarzan Tyler and Len Montana - are tied with the most reigns with two each. Gunkel has the most individual reigns with seven. The following is a chronological list of teams that have been International Tag Team Champions by ring name.

== Title history ==
Key
| No. | Overall reign number |
| Reign | Reign number for the specific team—reign numbers for the individuals are in parentheses, if different |
| Days | Number of days held |

| No. | Champion | Championship change | | | Reign statistics | | Notes | Ref. |
| No. | Champion | Date | Event | Location | Reign | Days | Notes | Ref. |
|---|---|---|---|---|---|---|---|---|
| 1 | Fred Atkins and Ike Eakins | October 1956 | GCW show | N/A | 1 | | Billed as champions upon arrival in the territory. | |
| 2 | Red McIntyre and Chief Big Heart | December 7, 1956 | GCW show | Atlanta, GA | 1 | 63 | | |
| 3 | Mark Lewin and Donn Lewin | February 8, 1957 | GCW show | Atlanta, GA | 1 | 35 | | |
| 4 | Don McIntyre and Red McIntyre (2) | March 15, 1957 | GCW show | Atlanta, GA | 1 | | | |
Championship history is unrecorded from March 15, 1957 to June, 1957 (NLT).
| 5 | Kurt Von Brauner and Freddie Blassie | June, 1957 (NLT) | GCW show | N/A | 1 | (Note: The exact date on which the title was won is not known, which means their title reign lasted between 1 and 20 days.) | | |
| 6 | Don McIntyre and Red McIntyre | June 21, 1957 | GCW show | Atlanta, GA | 2 | | | |
Championship history is unrecorded from June 21, 1957 to July 20, 1957 (NLT).
| 7 | Don McIntyre (3) and Tarzan White | July 20, 1957 (NLT) | GCW show | N/A | 1 | | | |
| 8 | The Von Brauners (Kurt Von Brauner and Fritz Von Brauner) | August 24, 1957 | GCW show | Rome, GA | 1 | 41 | | |
| 9 | Ray Gunkel and Don McIntyre (4) | October 4, 1957 | GCW show | Atlanta, GA | 1 | | | |
Championship history is unrecorded from October 4, 1957 to February, 1958 (NLT).
| 10 | Ray Gunkel (2) and Billy Red Lyons | February, 1958 (NLT) | GCW show | N/A | 1 | (Note: The exact date on which the title was won is not known, which means their title reign lasted between 35 and 62 days.) | | |
| 11 | The Mighty Yankee and Don Lee | April 4, 1958 | GCW show | Atlanta, GA | 1 | 14 | | |
| 12 | Karl Heinkler and Kurt Von Brauner (3) | April 18, 1958 | GCW show | Atlanta, GA | 1 | 7 | | |
| 13 | Angelo Martinelli and Rocky Columbo | April 25, 1958 | GCW show | Atlanta, GA | 1 | | | |
Championship history is unrecorded from April 25, 1958 to June, 1958 (NLT).
| 14 | Jack Dillon and Don Lee (2) | June, 1958 (NLT) | GCW show | N/A | 1 | (Note: The exact date on which the title was won is not known, which means their title reign lasted between 1 and 12 days.) | | |
| 15 | Ray Gunkel (3) and Ron Etchison | June 13, 1958 | GCW show | Atlanta, GA | 1 | 63 | | |
| — | Vacated | August 15, 1958 | GCW show | Atlanta, GA | — | — | Championship is held-up after a controversial title defense against Freddie Blassie and Angelo Poffo ended in a no-contest. | |
Championship history is unrecorded from August 15, 1958 to October, 1958 (NLT).
| 16 | Ray Gunkel (4) and Nick Roberts | October, 1958 (NLT) | GCW show | N/A | 1 | (Note: The exact date on which the title was won is not known, which means their title reign lasted between 1 and 9 days.) | | |
| 17 | Freddie Blassie (2) and Bob Shipp | October 10, 1958 | GCW show | Atlanta, GA | 2 | | | |
Championship history is unrecorded from October 10, 1958 to January, 1959 (NLT).
| 18 | Ray Gunkel (5) and Don McIntyre (5) | January, 1959 (NLT) | GCW show | N/A | 2 | | | |
Championship history is unrecorded from January, 1959 (NLT) to December, 1959 (NLT).
| 19 | Ray Gunkel (6) and Dick Gunkel | December, 1959 (NLT) | GCW show | N/A | 1 | | | |
Championship history is unrecorded from December, 1959 (NLT) to May 3, 1960 (NLT).
| 20 | Freddie Blassie (3) and Eric Pederson | May 3, 1960 (NLT) | GCW show | N/A | 1 | | | |
Championship history is unrecorded from May 3, 1960 (NLT) to June, 1960 (NLT).
| 21 | The Corsicans (Corsica Joe and Corsica Jean) | June, 1960 (NLT) | GCW show | N/A | 1 | | | |
Championship history is unrecorded from June, 1960 (NLT) to April, 1961 (NLT).
| 22 | Gypsy Joe and Skull Murphy | April, 1961 (NLT) | GCW show | N/A | 1 | | | |
Championship history is unrecorded from April, 1961 (NLT) to January 5, 1962 (NLT).
| 23 | Jean Gaullois and Paul Gaullois | January 5, 1962 (NLT) | GCW show | N/A | 1 | | | |
Championship history is unrecorded from January 5, 1962 (NLT) to April, 1963 (NLT).
| 24 | Tarzan Tyler and Len Montana | April, 1963 (NLT) | GCW show | N/A | 1 | | | |
| 25 | Dick Steinborn (2) and Chief Little Eagle | April 27, 1963 | GCW show | Atlanta, GA | 1 | | | |
| 26 | Tarzan Tyler and Len Montana | June, 1963 (NLT) | GCW show | N/A | 2 | | | |
| 27 | Bill Dromo and Chief Little Eagle (2) | June 5, 1963 | GCW show | Columbus, GA | 1 | 9 | | |
| 28 | Ray Gunkel (7) and Dick Steinborn (3) | June 14, 1963 | GCW show | Atlanta, GA | 2 | | | |
