= Tex McKenzie =

American wrestler (1930–2001)

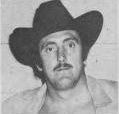
- McKenzie, c. 1982

Personal information
- Born: Frank Hugh McKenzie; July 21, 1930 Edmonds, Washington, U.S.
- Died: May 31, 2001 (aged 70) Victoria, British Columbia, Canada

Professional wrestling career
- Ring name(s): Tex McKenzie; Goliath; Dakota Mack
- Billed height: 6 ft 9 in (206 cm)
- Billed weight: 280 lb (127 kg)
- Trained by: Jack Pfeffer
- Debut: 1950
- Retired: 1977

Frank Hugh McKenzie (July 21, 1930 – May 31, 2001) was an American professional wrestler. During his career, he appeared in the American Wrestling Association, IWA Australia, National Wrestling Federation, and Maple Leaf Wrestling.

== Professional wrestling career ==
=== Early career (1950s) ===
McKenzie wrestled in Texas during the early 1950s under the name Goliath. In 1954, he went to Canada to wrestle for Stu Hart's Stampede Wrestling in Calgary. He formed a tag team with Ilio DiPaolo and won the NWA Calgary Tag Team Championship by defeating Al and Tiny Mills in early November. McKenzie also held the NWA Canadian Open Tag Team Championship in June with Whipper Billy Watson.

=== American Wrestling Association (1958, 1961–1965, 1970) ===
McKenzie started wrestling for the American Wrestling Association in Minnesota in 1958, competing there for many years. In 1961, he feuded with Bob Geigel and Bill Miller. On October 10, 1970, McKenzie defeated Tarzan Tyler for the AWA Midwest Heavyweight Championship in Omaha, Nebraska, before dropping the title a month later to Ole Anderson and leaving the company.

=== IWA Australia (1964–1969) ===
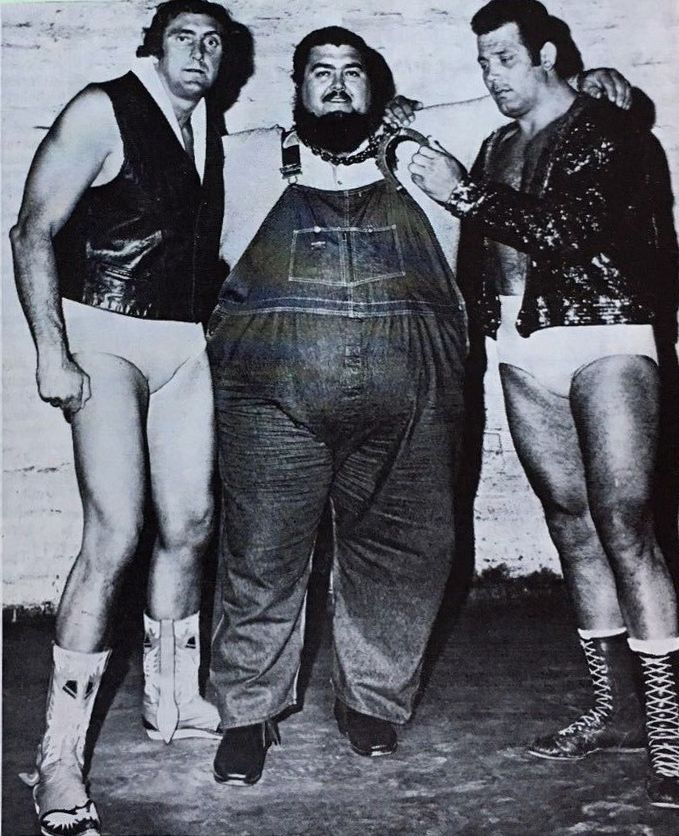
McKenzie (left) with Haystacks Calhoun and Mario Milano, c. 1971

In 1964, he went to Australia to wrestle for IWA Australia, feuding with Killer Kowalski. On June 6, 1967, McKenzie defeated Kowalski for the IWA World Heavyweight Championship. He dropped the title to Skull Murphy in August. A year later, he regained the title by defeating Toru Tanaka on November 13, 1968, before once again dropping the title to Murphy and leaving Australia in 1969.

=== Various promotions (1965–1977) ===
From 1965 to 1967, he wrestled for Mid-Atlantic Championship Wrestling, forming a tag team with Nelson Royal in the late 60s. McKenzie would wrestle in Toronto for Maple Leaf Wrestling from 1970 to 1975. He teamed with various partners against the Love Brothers and the Fabulous Kangaroos (Al Costello and Don Kent). In 1974, he and Red Bastien held the NWA Texas Tag Team Championship. McKenzie also did commentary for the International Wrestling Association during this time before retiring from wrestling in 1977.

== Death ==
On May 31, 2001, McKenzie died at a hospital in Victoria, British Columbia, at the age of 70, from complications of an abdominal aortic aneurysm he suffered while on a boat.

== Championships and accomplishments ==
- American Wrestling Association
  - AWA Midwest Heavyweight Championship (1 time)
  - Nebraska Tag Tean Championship(1 time) - with Verne Gagne
- Stampede Wrestling
  - Stampede Wrestling Hall of Fame (Class of 1995)
  - NWA Canadian Tag Team Championship (Calgary version) (1 time) – with Ilio DiPaolo
- Maple Leaf Wrestling
  - NWA Canadian Open Tag Team Championship (1 time) – with Whipper Billy Watson
- National Wrestling Alliance
  - NWA Northwest Tag Team Championship (1 time) – with Ken Kenneth
- NWA Big Time Wrestling
  - NWA Texas Tag Team Championship (1 time) – with Red Bastien
- World Championship Wrestling
  - IWA World Heavyweight Championship (Australia) (2 times)
  - IWA World Tag Team Championship (2 times) – with Billy White Wolf
