= List of Big Time Wrestling alumni (Boston) =

Big Time Wrestling was a professional wrestling promotion based in Boston, Massachusetts from 1960 to 1975. Former Big Time Wrestling employees consisted of professional wrestlers, managers, play-by-play and color commentators, announcers, interviewers and referees.

== Alumni ==
=== Male wrestlers ===
Birth name	Ring name(s)	Tenure	Ref
Katsuji Adachi^{†}	Mr. Hito	1961	
William Afflis^{†}	Dick the Bruiser	1960; 1961	
Roy Albern^{†}	Bummy Rogers / Bunny Rogers; Rip Collins	1960–1961; 1963	
Roger Barnes	Ronnie Garvin	1960; 1966–1967	
Andre Beauchamp	Mighty Ursus	1962	
Carl Bell^{†}	Don Eagle	1963	
Antonino Biasetton^{†}	Antonino Rocca; Argentina Rocca	1960–1961; 1963	
Guy Brunetti^{†}	Guy Brunetti	1960	
Paul Christerson	Paul Christy	1964	
Pierre Clermont	Pat Patterson	1961–1962	
Yvon Cormier^{†}	The Beast	1963	
Tony DeMore	Gypsy Joe	1963–1965	
Ilio DiPaolo^{†}	Ilio DiPaolo	1961–1962; 1964	
Henry Faggart^{†}	Jackie Fargo	1961–1964	
Jack Faggart Sr.^{†}	Sonny Fargo	1962	
Frank Falzarano^{†}	Gypsy Joe Gonzales	1962–1963; 1965–1970	
Mario Fornini^{†}	Angelo Savoldi	1963	
Laverne Gagne^{†}	Verne Gagne	1960	
George Gallagher^{†}	Mike Gallagher	1961	
John Gallagher^{†}	Doc Gallagher	1961	
Richard Gland^{†}	Bulldog Brower	1963	
José Gomez^{†}	Pepper Gomez	1960	
Russ Groves^{†}	Golden Boy Dupree; Ronnie Dupree; Ron Dupree	1960–1966	
Charles Harris^{†}	Maurice Chevier; The Magnificent Chevier	1965–1966	
Ronald Hill^{†}	Ronnie Hill; Ron Hill	1960–1967	
Eric Holmback^{†}	Yukon Eric	1960	
Austin Johnson	Hobo Brazil	1963–1964	
James Johnson^{†}	Grady Calhoun; Luke Graham	1961–1964	
Terry Joyal^{†}	Terry Garvin	1960; 1962–1963; 1966–1967	
Juan Kachmanian^{†}	Pampero Firpo	1960	
Don Kindred	Mr. Black Magic	1961–1962	
Fred Koury Sr.^{†}	Bull Curry	1960–1961; 1963–1967	
Fred Koury Jr.	Fred Curry; Fred Khoury	1963–1964; 1965	
Guy Larose^{†}	Hans Schmidt	1961–1965; 1967	
Carey Lloyd^{†}	Hobo Brazil; Rufus R. Jones	1965–1967; 1969	
Louis LaCourse	Duke Savage; The Beast	1967–1968	
Leslie Malady	Les Malady	1960–1961	
Chris Markoff	Franz Von Erich	1964	
Frank Menacker	Sam Menacker	1960	
Pedro Morales^{†}	Pedro Morales	1962	
Dominic Nucciarone	Dominic DeNucci	1961–1962	
Frederick Pantano^{†}	Bull Montana	1960–1964; 1966–1970	
Soterios Pappas^{†}	Jesse James	1960–1966; 1970	
Miguel Pérez^{†}	Miguel Pérez	1960–1961	
Eric Pomeroy^{†}	Eric Pomeroy	1962	
Harley Race^{†}	The Great Mortimer; The Great Gilroy	1961–1962; 1963	
Isaac Rosario	Bruno SanMartino; Pancho Rosario	1960; 1963–1966	
Virgil Runnels Jr.	Dusty Rhodes; Dusty Runnells	1967	
Gene Sanizzaro^{†}	Gene Dundee	1960; 1963–1964	
Francis Scarpa^{‡}	Frankie Scarpa; Frank Scarpa; Manuel Cortez	1960–1969^{‡}	
Frank Shields^{†}	Frank Shields; Bruiser Shields; The Bruiser; The Boston Bruiser	1960–1964	
Roy Shropshire	Roy Shire	1961	
Edward Spulnik^{†}	Killer Kowalski	1960–1961	
Joseph Tangaro^{†}	Joe Brunetti	1960	
Alexander Tonko^{†}	Lou Khesz	1964	
Paul Vachon	Paul Vachon	1961–1962	
Edward Welch^{†}	Buddy Fuller; George Valentine	1963; 1966	
Unknown	George Valentine	1963	
Lester Welch^{†}	Lester Welch; Les Welch	1961	
Alexander Woodward	Naldo Von Erich	1964	
Edward Wright^{†}	Bearcat Wright	1961	
Unknown	The Great Mortimer	1967	
Unknown	Al Poholik; Al Poholick; Art Poholek	1960–1961	
Unknown	Alex Kostopoulous	1964	
Ajandro Medina^{†}	Alex Medina; Al Medina	1960–1963	
Unknown	Angelo Puglese	1966	
Unknown	Angelo Rocca; Angie Rocca	1960–1962	
Unknown	Angelo Venturi	1960	
Unknown	Antonio Souza	1960	
Unknown	Apache Eagle	1962	
Unknown	Armando Federico	1960–1961; 1963	
Unknown	Bad Boy Gallagher	1961	
Unknown	Barney O'Shea	1960	
Alfred DeBenedetti^{†}	Baron Antonio Verdi; Great Antonio Verdi	1960; 1969	
Guiseppe Gattone^{†}	Baron Gattoni	1962	
Unknown	Baron Scakluma	1966	
Unknown	Baron von Herring	1968–1969	
Unknown	Bavarian Brother #1	1960	
Unknown	Bavarian Brother #2	1960	
George Thompson^{†}	Bearcat Jones	1964–1965	
Unknown	Ben James	1961	
Seymour Koenig	Benny Berg	1964	
Unknown	Big Daddy Robinson	1960–1965	
Unknown	Big Luke Summerfield	1965–1967	
Unknown	Bill Donovan	1960	
Unknown	Bill Graham	1960–1962; 1966	
Unknown	Billy Lynch; Billy "The Kid" Lynch	1961	
Unknown	The Black Hood	1962	
Unknown	Black Owl	1968	
Unknown	The Black Terror	1960; 1966	
Bob Harmon	Bob Harmon	1963–1964	
Unknown	Bob Nandor	1960	
Unknown	Bob Pope	1965–1966	
Bob Merrill	Bob Stanlee	1962	
Unknown	Bob Yore	1967-1968	
Unknown	Bobby Darnell	1962	
Unknown	Bobby Nixon	1965	
Unknown	Bobby Thomas	1964	
Robert Russell Sr.^{†}	Rebel Russell; The Masked Marvel; Boris Fabian	1960; 1963; 1966	
Unknown	Buck Jordan	1961	
Unknown	Buddy Lee	1964	
Unknown	Bull Kalenko	1960	
Italo Orio	Buzz Orio	1961–1962; 1968–1970	
Unknown	Cal West	1960; 1963–1964	
Unknown	Carl Mortier	1964	
Unknown	Carlos Paredes	1968	
Unknown	Charlie Decker	1961	
Unknown	Charlie Porter; Charley Porter	1960–1961	
Unknown	Chief Eagle	1968–1969	
Unknown	Chief Lone Eagle; Lone Eagle	1961–1962	
Richard Buster^{†}	Chief White Eagle	1962	
Unknown	Chippewa Charlie	1961	
Christos Belkas^{†}	Chris Belkas; The Golden Greek	1966–1969	
Charles Conley^{†}	Chuck Conley	1963	
Unknown	Chuck Montana	1963	
Unknown	Cousin Alfred	1966	
Unknown	Cowboy Tom Blatz; Cowboy Blatz; Cowboy Blatze	1965	
Unknown	Crusher O'Hara	1962	
Unknown	Dan Miller	1960	
Unknown	Dan O'Kelly	1960	
Richard Arrington^{†}	Dick Arrington	1968	
Unknown	Dick Bussiere; Dick Bousier	1960	
Unknown	Dick Dusek / Dicky Dusek	1961; 1963	
Unknown	Dick Marquis	1960–1963	
Unknown	Digger O'Dell	1961	
Unknown	Duke Graham	1967–1968	
Unknown	Dutch Spinner	1968	
Unknown	Dory Nixon	1963–1968	
Unknown	Dr. Couture	1966	
Unknown	Ed McCoy	1960	
Unknown	Ed Miller	1960	
Unknown	Ed Ortega	1965	
Unknown	Eddie Eschabab	1960	
Unknown	Eddie Ortiz	1961; 1965	
Unknown	El Diablo	1962; 1968	
Unknown	El Santo	1968	
Unknown	El Toro	1963	
Unknown	Emilio Carnera; Young Carnera	1961–1962	
Unknown	Enrico Ponzi	1960	
Unknown	Eugenio Perez; Eugene Perez	1961–1963; 1965	
Unknown	Fat Daddy Garrette	1962	
Unknown	Federico Giovanni	1961	
Unknown	Fidel Castro	1963–1964	
Unknown	Flash Gordon	1961	
Unknown	Flash Serrano	1963	
Unknown	Flash Thomas	1961–1965; 1967	
Malcolm Cormier^{†}	The Flying Frenchman; Malcolm Cormier; Mal Cormier	1966–1967; 1968–1969	
Unknown	Frank Flynn	1962	
Unknown	Frank James	1963; 1966–1970	
Unknown	Frank Kinred	1960–1962	
Unknown	Gamma Singh	1966	
Eugene Anderson^{†}	Gene Anderson	1962	
Unknown	George Balbo	1961	
Unknown	George Georgoupolos; The Greek Gladiator	1965	
Unknown	George LaCourse	1967–1968	
Unknown	George Speros	1967	
Unknown	Gerard Dugas	1961	
Unknown	Gerry O'Brien	1961	
Unknown	Gino Amatangelo; Gino Armantangelo	1960–1962	
Unknown	Gino Leone	1964	
Unknown	Gino Perez	1962–1963	
Unknown	Golden Boy Richard	1964	
Unknown	Gorgeous George Allen	1965–1966	
Unknown	Gorgeous George Bell	1961	
Unknown	Gorilla Morgan	1967; 1970	
Unknown	The Great Gaucho	1964	
Unknown	The Great Rajah	1965	
Harry Finkelstein^{†}	Harry Lewis	1960	
Unknown	Haystack Mahoney	1960	
William Toomey^{†}	Haystack Muldoon	1960–1962; 1966–1968	
Don Serrano	Hector Serrano	1962	
Unknown	The Hooded Terror	1960; 1966	
Unknown	Hussain Arab	1967	
George Wilos Jr.^{†}	Irish Red O'Malley; Red O'Malley	1963	
Unknown	Ivan Kalmikoff	1962	
Unknown	Ivan Malenkoff; Ivan Melenkoff	1963; 1965	
Omar van de Schueren	Ivan Strogoff	1960–1962	
Jack Dillon^{†}	Jack Dillon	1960	
Samuel Nichals^{†}	Jackie Nichols	1963	
Unknown	Jerry Graham	1960	
Unknown	Jim Thorpe Jr.	1964	
Unknown	Jimmy Beaton	1966–1967; 1969	
Unknown	Jimmy Valentine	1960–1961; 1965–1966	
Unknown	John Emanuello	1960–1961	
Unknown	Johnny Ringo	1967	
Unknown	Johnny Rougeau	1967	
John Stewart^{†}	Johnny Thunder	1964	
Joe Crugnale^{†}	Joe Crugnale; Giuseppe Crugnale	1961–1962; 1964–1965; 1968–1969	
Joseph Esposito	Joe Esposito	1962	
Unknown	Joe Red Sasso	1960–1963	
Unknown	Jumping Rocco	1964	
Unknown	Karl von Himmel	1960	
Unknown	Ken Barbetti	1960	
Kenneth Ackles^{†}	Kenny Ackles	1962	
Unknown	Killer Curt Douglas	1960–1961; 1964	
Unknown	Killer Johnson	1963	
Unknown^{†}	Kit Fox	1963	
Arthur Beauchene^{†}	Larry Chene	1964	
Laurent Moquin^{†}	Larry Moquin	1965	
Unknown	Leon Dupre	1961	
James Osborne	Lil Abner; Lil' Abner the Kentucky Hillbilly	1963–1966	
Unknown	Little Bobo; Mr. Bobo; Young Bobo	1961	
Unknown	Lord Byron	1967–1969	
Unknown	Lord Monagle Byrnes	1966	
Unknown	Lou Loco Meza	1960	
Unknown	Louis Rivera	1968–1969	
Unknown	Louis Valenzuella; Luis Valenzeulo	1966–1968; 1970	
Unknown	The Mad Mongol	1962–1963; 1966	
Unknown	The Mad Mongol #2	1963	
Unknown	Man Mountain Sprague	1968	
Unknown	Mario DeSouza	1964	
Unknown	Mike Alfred	1966	
Unknown	Mike Higgins	1960	
Unknown	Miguel Firpo	1964	
Unknown	Miguel Torres	1961–1962	
Unknown	The Monster; The Hooded Monster	1963	
Unknown	Mr. Morris	1965	
Unknown	Mr. Mystery	1965	
Unknown	Mr. Nobility	1963	
Unknown	Mr. Puerto Rico	1961	
Unknown	Mr. Queay	1961	
Unknown	Mr. X	1961	
Unknown	The Nature Boy	1964	
Unknown	Nature Boy Del Rio; Nature Boy Armand Del Rio	1961	
Unknown	Nature Boy Ricco; Native Boy Ricco	1960–1961	
Unknown	Negron Perez	1968–1969	
Unknown	Nick Valley	1960–1962	
Unknown	Nikita Kalmikoff	1962	
Unknown	The Oklahoma Cyclone	1965	
Unknown	The Oklahoma Kid	1968	
George McIntyre	Paddy Mack	1962	
Unknown	Paul Shusas	1966–1967	
Unknown	Pancho Mendoza	1960	
Unknown	Pancho Zapata	1964	
Unknown	Pat O'Connor	1960	
Sunday Feuer^{†}	Pat O'Hara	1962–1963	
Unknown	Pat Sullivan	1960; 1966	
Roberto Soto	Pepe Perez	1964–1966; 1968; 1970	
Unknown	Peter Wingo	1965–1968	
Unknown	Pierre Carpentier	1963	
Unknown	Pierre Goulet; Pierre Goullette	1964	
Unknown	Pierre LaChapelle	1961	
Unknown	Pierre LaMarin	1960	
Edouard Auger^{†}	Pierre LaSalle	1962	
Unknown	The Phantom; The Mysterious Phantom	1964	
Unknown	Preacher Lowe	1961	
Carlos Colón Sr.	Prince Kukuya	1966–1967	
Unknown	Prince Omar	1961–1962; 1965	
Unknown	Ray Cortez	1968	
Unknown	Ray Jackson	1968–1969	
Unknown	Red Groupe	1960	
Unknown	Rene Carpentier	1960; 1962	
Unknown	Rick Miller	1966	
Bernard Herman^{†}	Ricki Starr	1961	
Unknown	Ricky Sexton	1962; 1965; 1966	
Unknown	Rafael Castro	1963	
Unknown	Ray Lewin	1963	
Unknown	Rocky Baron	1960	
Unknown	Roger Carpentier	1960	
Unknown	Rudy Valentino	1967	
Wilfred Bath^{†}	Rusty Barend; Rusty Baron	1962–1963	
Unknown	The Shadow	1963	
Unknown	The Shadow; Reno Lee Mon	1967	
Unknown	Smasher Bloom	1967	
Unknown	Smasher Brewer	1966	
Unknown	Sonny Hill	1960	
Frank Hickey^{†}	Spaceman Frank Hickey; Frank Hickey	1964; 1966	
Unknown	Steve Karas	1960; 1962	
Paul Zygowicz^{†}	Steve Stanlee	1962	
Unknown	The Strangler	1963	
T.J. Henderson	Sweet Daddy Watts	1967–1968	
Unknown	Syd Siskay	1963	
Unknown	Tito Perez	1965	
Unknown	Tito Romero	1964	
Unknown	Tony Leone	1964	
Paul DeMarchi	Tony Sinatra	1964	
Unknown	Taro Sakura	1963	
Donald Gaston^{†}	Ted Blassie / Teddie Blassie	1964	
Unknown	The Texas Rebel; Texas Rebel #1	1960	
Unknown	Texas Rebel #2	1960	
Unknown	Tip Toe Graham	1964	
Unknown	Tony Altamore	1966	
Antonio Baillargeon^{†}	Tony Baillargeon	1961	
Manuel Enos^{†}	Tony Enos	1960–1964	
Anthony Aurelio^{†}	Prince Nero; Tony Nero	1964	
Anthony Zollo^{†}	Tony Zollo	1962–1963; 1965–1967	
Unknown	Tommy Thomas	1962	
Adolphus Truesdale	Tuffy Truesdale	1962; 1966–1967	
Unknown	Ty Torres	1967–1968	
Unknown	Vorrius the Greek	1960	
Unknown	Weeping Willie	1963	
Unknown	The White Terror	1960	
Unknown	Whitey Hogan	1961	
Unknown	Wildman Firpo	1960	
Unknown	Wild Red Barry	1960	
Unknown	Young Montana	1965	
Unknown	Yvon Carpentier	1960	
Unknown	Yvon Durrell; Yvon Durelle	1961; 1963	
Unknown	The Zebra Kid	1966	
Unknown	Zim Zam	1963	
Unknown	Zampiro Firpo	1961	

=== Female wrestlers ===
Birth name	Ring name(s)	Tenure	Ref
Gloria Barattini^{†}	Gloria Barattini	1961–1962	
Nellya Baughman^{†}	Judy Grable	1962	
Silvia Calzadilla	Sylvia Torres	1964–1965; 1967	
Mary Carroll	Pat Sherry	1964–1965; 1967	
Lucille Ann Casey	Ann Casey	1962	
Jeanette Collins	Bambi Ball	1960–1962	
Willa Mae Dugas	Doris Dorsey	1965–1967	
Mary Ellison^{†}	Slave Girl Moolah	1962	
Margarita Gaitan^{†}	Maria Garcia	1964	
Frances Gravette^{†}	Fran Gravette	1962	
Yolanda Gutierrez^{†}	Rita Cortez	1963–1965	
Susie Mae McCoy^{†}	Sweet Georgia Brown	1962; 1964–1965	
Alma Osbak	Alma Mills	1960–1962; 1964–1965; 1967–1970	
Cora Svonsteckik^{†}	Cora Coombs	1968	
Betty Wingo^{†}	Babs Wingo	1961	
Ethel Wingo^{†}	Ethel Johnson	1961	
Marva Wingo^{†}	Marva Scott	1961	
Johnnie Young^{†}	Mae Young	1961–1962	
Unknown	Adrienne Ames; Adrianna Ames	1961	
Unknown	Ann Quimbey	1967–1968	
Unknown	Betty Monroe	1961	
Unknown	Betty Ann Spencer	1964–1965	
Unknown	Bonnie Spindello	1967–1968	
Unknown	Brenda Scott	1962	
Unknown	Candy Carol	1968	
Unknown	Carolyn Little	1962	
Unknown	Christa Clark; Christa Clarke; Christine Clark; Christy Clark; Cynthia Clarke	1961–1962	
Unknown	Diana Beamon; Dinah Beaman	1962	
Unknown	Dolly Baker	1968	
Unknown	Dolly St. Cyr	1960	
Unknown	Donna McCoy	1968	
Unknown	Dotty Carter	1962	
Unknown	Elizabeth Scott	1961	
Unknown	Etta Charles	1962	
Unknown	Georgia Brown	1962; 1964–1966	
Unknown	Gloria Stewart	1961; 1962	
Unknown	Kitty Adams	1962	
Unknown	Kitty Regan	1968	
Unknown	Lady Blimp	1961	
Unknown	Lois Valdez	1960	
Unknown	Lucille Dupree; Lucy Dupree	1960–1962; 1964–1967	
Unknown	Lulu Mae Provo	1961	
Unknown	Lulu Palhus	1960	
Unknown	Maggie Santiago	1968–1970	
Unknown	Marva DelFonte	1961	
Unknown	Mary DeLeone	1962	
Unknown^{†}	Mary Jane Mull	1961–1962; 1965–1967	
Unknown	Mary Reynolds	1961	
Unknown	Mitzi Allen	1960	
Unknown	Mohla Siki	1961	
Unknown	Mona Baker	1960–1961	
Unknown	Olga Martinez	1962	
Unknown	Patsy O'Brien; Patricia O'Brien	1962	
Unknown	Princess Little Cloud	1965	
Unknown	Ramona Isabella	1961	
Unknown	The Red Devil; The Mysterious Red Devil	1967	
Unknown	Sally Gabor	1960	
Unknown	Tina Cole	1962	

=== Midget wrestlers ===
Birth name	Ring name(s)	Tenure	Ref
Roland Barriault	Frenchie LaMont	1968	
Robert Bradley^{†}	Cowboy Bradley	1965–1966	
Roger Butts	Brown Panther	1962	
John Cusic^{†}	Irish Jackie	1962; 1966	
Normande Gagnon	Dolly Darcel	1962	
Marcel Gauthier^{†}	Sky Low Low	1962	
Jean Girard^{†}	Little Brutus	1966	
Lionel Giroux^{†}	Little Beaver	1962	
William Guillot^{†}	Billy the Kid	1962; 1965–1966	
Sylvia McMillian^{†}	Darling Dagmar; Little Darlin' Dagmar	1961–1962	
Paul Richard	Farmer Pete	1960	
Jean Roy^{†}	Pancho Lopez	1962	
Leon Stap^{†}	Fuzzy Cupid	1962; 1965–1966	
Unknown	Baby Cheryl; Baby Doll Cheryl	1961–1962	
Unknown	Bouncing Burke	1962	
Unknown	Chico Santana	1965	
Unknown	Diamond Jim Brady	1960–1963; 1966	
Unknown	The Jamaica Kid	1966	
Unknown	Little Diamond Eagle; Diamond Eagle	1965	
Unknown	Little Fabian	1960	
Unknown	The Little Jamaican	1965	
Unknown	Sir Robert Randall	1960–1961	
Unknown	Sonny Boy Cassidy	1960–1962; 1965–1966; 1969	
Unknown	Tiny Tim	1962	
Unknown	Tom Thumb	1966	
Unknown	Vincent Garibaldi	1960–1962; 1969	

=== Stables and tag teams ===
Tag team/Stable(s)	Members	Tenure(s)
The Bavarian Brothers	Bavarian Brother #1 and Bavarian Brother #2	1960
Joe & Guy Brunetti	Joe Brunetti and Guy Brunetti	1960
Fidel & Rafael Castro	Fidel Castro and Rafael Castro	1963
Bull Curry & Fred Curry	Bull Curry and Fred Curry	1965
The Fabulous Fargos	Jackie Fargo and Sonny Fargo	1962
The Fabulous Kangaroos	Al Costello and Roy Heffernan	1961
Doc & Mike Gallagher	Doc Gallagher and Mike Gallagher	1961
Terry Garvin & Ronnie Garvin	Terry Garvin and Ronnie Garvin	1966; 1967
Ivan & Nikita Kalmikoff	Ivan Kalmikoff and Nikita Kalmikoff	1962
Ed & Dan Miller	Ed Miller and Dan Miller	1960
The Scufflin' Hillbillies	Rip Collins and Chuck Conley	1963
The Scufflin' Hillbillies	Cousin Alfred and Mike Alfred	1966
Bob & Steve Stanlee	Bob Stanlee and Steve Stanlee	1962
The Tennessee Hillbillies	Lil Abner and Big Luke	1965
The Texas Rebels	Texas Rebel #1 and Texas Rebel #2	1960

=== Animal wrestlers ===
Birth name	Ring name(s)	Tenure	Ref
Unknown	Black Ozzie the Wrestling Bear	1960	
Unknown	Smokey the Wrestling Bear	1967	
Unknown	Victor the Wrestling Bear	1966	
Unknown	Yogi the Wrestling Bear	1962	
Unknown	The Wrestling Alligator	1962; 1966	
Unknown	Cindy the Elephant	1967	

=== Referees ===
Birth name:	Ring name(s):	Tenure:	Notes
Unknown	Ken Barbetti	1961–1962	
Unknown	Al Castoldi	1961	
Unknown	Dick Marquis	1961	
James Nance	Bo Nance	1968	Special guest referee

=== Other personnel ===
Birth name:	Ring name(s):	Tenure:	Notes
Walter Lipson ^{†}	Walter Lipson		Public relations manager
Jack Pfefer ^{†}	Jack Pfefer	1960-1967	Booker
Anthony Sanizzaro Sr. ^{†}	Tony Santos	1960-1974	Promoter
Anthony Sanizzaro Jr. ^{†}	Tony Santos Jr.	1974-1975	Promoter
Gene Sanizzaro^{†}	Gene Dundee	1974–1975	Promoter

Company name to Year
Company name:	Years:
Big Time Wrestling	1960–1975
Notes
^{†} Indicates they are deceased.
^{‡} Indicates they died while they were employed with Big Time Wrestling.
