= Bert Smith =

Bert Smith may refer to:

- Bert Smith (footballer, born 1892) (1892–1969), English footballer
- Bert Smith (footballer, born 1896), Irish footballer
- Bert Smith (ice hockey) (1925–2001), British ice hockey player
- R. R. R. Smith (born 1954; known as Bert Smith), British classicist, archaeologist, and academic
- Stan Kowalski (born Bert Smith, 1926–2017), American wrestler

== See also ==
- Bertie Smith, character in Oh! What a Lovely War
- Albert Smith (disambiguation)
- Herbert Smith (disambiguation)
- Hubert Smith (disambiguation)
- Robert Smith (disambiguation)
