= Mitsu Arakawa =

American professional wrestler (1927–1997)

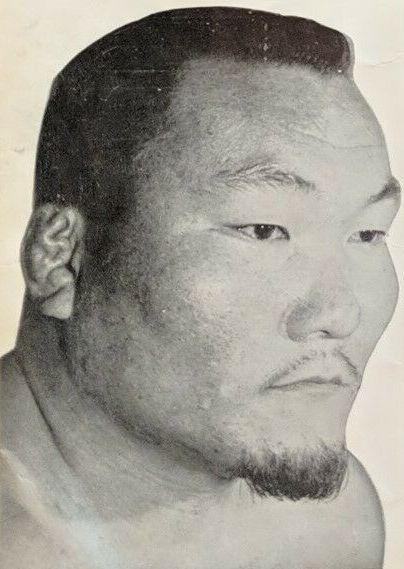
- A photograph of Arakawa from 1969.

Personal information
- Born: Mack Mitsukazu Arakawa; May 23, 1927 Honolulu, Territory of Hawaii
- Died: April 17, 1997 (aged 69) Concord, California, U.S.
- Cause of death: Heart failure
- Spouse: Patti Arakawa
- Children: 3

Professional wrestling career
- Ring name: Mitsu Arakawa
- Billed height: 5 ft 7 in (1.70 m)
- Billed weight: 242 lb (110 kg)
- Billed from: Japan
- Trained by: The Great Yamato
- Debut: 1953
- Retired: 1976

Mack Mitsukazu Arakawa (May 23, 1927 – April 17, 1997) was an American professional wrestler. He is best known for his appearances with the Minneapolis, Minnesota-based NWA Minneapolis Boxing & Wrestling Club/American Wrestling Association.

== Early life ==
Arakawa was born in Hawaii in 1927. He enlisted in the United States Army in 1945.

== Professional wrestling career ==
Arakawa was trained to wrestle by The Great Yamato. He made his professional wrestling debut in 1953. Wrestling as a heel throughout his career, Arakawa was billed as being a Japanese citizen who had survived the atomic bombing of Hiroshima and bore a grudge against the United States as a result. He spent the early years of his career wrestling throughout the Midwest United States.

In 1957, Arakawa debuted in the NWA Minneapolis Boxing & Wrestling Club, where he was billed as Kinji Shibuya's cousin. In August 1957, he and Shibuya defeated the Kalmikoffs to win the NWA World Tag Team Championship (Minneapolis version). They lost the championship to Joe Brunetti and Guy Brunetti in November 1957. In December 1967, Arakawa and Dr. Moto defeated Pat O'Connor and Wilbur Snyder for the AWA World Tag Team Championship. They held the championship for over a year before losing to The Crusher and Dick the Bruiser in December 1968.

In 1959, Arakawa joined the Indianapolis-based World Wrestling Association (WWA). In October 1966, he defeated Dick the Bruiser to win the WWA World Heavyweight Championship. He lost the championship to Wilbur Snyder in September 1967.

Arakawa toured Australia in 1965, 1966 and 1970, winning the IWA World Heavyweight Championship during his first tour. In the mid-1960s, he performed in Canada with Shibuya, with the duo winning the Stampede Wrestling International Tag Team Championship in 1963.

In the late 1960s, Arakawa and Toru Tanaka began wrestling for the World Wide Wrestling Federation (WWWF) as "The Rising Suns". In June 1969, The Rising Suns were crowned the inaugural WWWF International Tag Team Champions (they were billed as having won a tournament that never took place). They lost the championship to Tony Marino and Víctor Rivera in December 1969.

In 1973, Arakawa appeared in The Wrestling Queen, a documentary on rookie professional wrestler Vivian Vachon.

Arakawa retired in 1976.

== Personal life ==
Arakawa was married to Patti, with whom he had two sons, David and Michael, and a daughter, Teresa.

== Death ==
Arakawa died of heart failure on April 17, 1997.

== Filmography ==
=== Film ===
Year	Title	Role	Notes
1973	The Wrestling Queen	Himself	Documentary

== Championships and accomplishments ==
- American Wrestling Alliance
  - AWA World Tag Team Championship (1 time) – with Kinji Shibuya
- NWA Minneapolis Boxing & Wrestling Club/American Wrestling Association
  - AWA World Tag Team Championship (1 time) – with Dr. Moto
  - NWA World Tag Team Championship (Minneapolis version) (1 time) – with Kinji Shibuya
  - Nebraska Tag Team Championship ( 1 time ) with Haru Sasaki
- NWA All-Star Wrestling
  - NWA Canadian Tag Team Championship (1 time) – with Kinji Shibuya
  - NWA Pacific Coast Tag Team Championship (1 time) – with Mr. Moto
- NWA San Francisco
  - NWA World Tag Team Championship (1 time) – with Kinji Shibuya
- National Wrestling Federation
  - NWF World Tag Team Championship (1 time) – with Yoshino Sato
- Stampede Wrestling
  - Stampede Wrestling International Tag Team Championship (1 time) – with Kinji Shibuya
- World Championship Wrestling
  - IWA World Heavyweight Championship (1 time)
- World Wrestling Association
  - WWA World Heavyweight Championship (1 time)
  - WWA World Tag Team Championship (2 times) – with Dr. Moto
- World Wide Wrestling Federation
  - WWWF International Tag Team Championship (1 time, inaugural) – with Toru Tanaka
