= Stan Holek =

Canadian professional wrestler (1933–2015)

Personal information
- Born: April 4, 1933 Chatham, Ontario, Canada
- Died: November 28, 2015 (aged 82)

Professional wrestling career
- Ring name(s): Stan Holek; Stan Lisowski; Stan Neilson; Cowboy Elliott Hardy; Stan Lutze
- Billed height: 6 ft 3 in (1.91 m)
- Billed weight: 240 lb (110 kg)
- Billed from: Milwaukee, Wisconsin
- Trained by: Bert Ruby; Ed Farhat; Larry Shane
- Debut: 1951

Stan Holek (April 4, 1933 – November 28, 2015) was a Canadian professional wrestler, better known by his ring names, Stan Lisowski and Stan Neilson. He became known for being part of two famous "brother" tag teams, the Lisowskis (with Reggie Lisowski) and the Neilsons (with Art Neilson).

== Professional wrestling career ==
Holek originally got into wrestling after his older brother began wrestling in Detroit. At age 18 in 1951, he debuted after training with Bert Rubi, The Sheik and Larry Chene in Detroit. He then began teaming with Reggie Lisowski as the Lisowski Brothers.

After the team split up, Holek began teaming with Lisowski's old partner Art Neilson. Neilson and Holek became known as the Neilsons. The Neilsons would become AWA World Tag Team Champions in 1962 defeating the team of Bob Geigel and Stan Kowalski. They lost the title later that year to Mr. High (Doug "Gilbert" Lindzy, no relation to the latter Doug Gilbert) and Mr. Low (Dick Steinborn).

In addition, Holek wrestled as Stan Lutze in New England in the 1950s. He also toured Japan in the 1960s.

== Personal life ==
Holek grew up on a farm in Chatham, Ontario, and has an older brother named Laddie. He moved to California in 1960 and later became an American citizen. He then worked in the rodeo for 13 years and he worked in gold mines in Nevada.

He was married twice. He was married to his second wife for over 30 years, and they have two daughters. He died on November 28, 2015, after a two year battle with colon cancer.

== Championships and accomplishments ==
- American Wrestling Alliance

- AWA World Tag Team Championship (Indiana version) (4 times) - with Art Neilson

- Maple Leaf Wrestling

- NWA Canadian Open Tag Team Championship (2 times) - with Reggie Lisowski

- NWA Chicago

- NWA World Tag Team Championship (Chicago version) (3 times) - with Reggie Lisowski

- NWA Minneapolis Wrestling and Boxing Club / American Wrestling Association

- AWA World Tag Team Championship (1 time) - with Art Neilson
- NWA World Tag Team Championship (Minneapolis version) (2 times) - with Reggie Lisowski

- Stampede Wrestling

- NWA International Tag Team Championship (Calgary version) (2 times) - with Art Neilson

- Worldwide Wrestling Associates

- WWA International Television Tag Team Championship (4 times) - with The Preacher (3) and Art Neilson (1)
