= Tiny Mills =

Canadian professional wrestler (1912–1987)

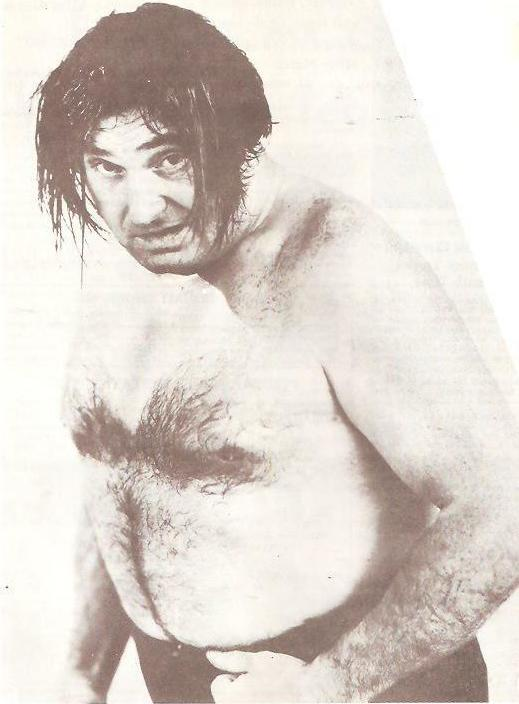
- Mills, c. 1967

Personal information
- Born: Henry W. Mittlestadt; December 7, 1912 Camrose, Alberta, Canada
- Died: June 24, 1987 (aged 74)
- Family: Al Mills (brother)

Professional wrestling career
- Ring name: Tiny Mills
- Billed height: 6 ft 3 in (191 cm)
- Billed weight: 270 lb (122 kg)
- Billed from: Camrose, Alberta, Canada; Missoula, Montana, US
- Debut: 1953
- Retired: 1974

Henry W. Mittlestadt (December 7, 1912 – June 24, 1987), best known by his ring name, Tiny Mills, was a Canadian professional wrestler. He often teamed with his brother Al Mills as the tag team Murder Incorporated (Murder Inc.). Later on Stan "Krusher" Kowalski would replace Al Mills as part of Murder Incorporated.

== Professional wrestling career ==
Mills started his wrestling career at the Maple Leaf Gardens in 1953. Teaming with his elder brother Al Mills, who had been wrestling since the 1930s, they were billed as "Murder Incorporated." Al and Tiny won Toronto's NWA Canadian Open Tag Team Championship in the debut year, defeating the Canadian dream team of Whipper Billy Watson and Yvon Robert. They drew huge houses at Maple Leaf Gardens that year. They traded the Championship with Watson and Hombre Montana as well as Ernie and Emil Dusek in 1954 and won the Championship once more in 1955, which was also the year Al made his final wrestling appearance in Toronto. After the death of Al Mills, Tiny decided to find a new partner and reform Murder Inc. in the late 1950s. He decided to team up with Minneapolis native Stan "Krusher" Kowalski. Team won the Minneapolis version of the NWA World Tag Team Championships twice while working for the NWA Minneapolis Wrestling and Boxing Club. When that promotion became the American Wrestling Association in 1960, Mills and Kowalski became the first AWA World Tag Team Champions. Mills not only worked in tag teams but as a singles wrestler as well. In 1960, Mills had a Championship match against NWA World Champion Pat O'Connor at Maple Leaf Gardens. Together with Kowalski, Tiny Mills once again won the Canadian Open Tag Team Championship, defeating Watson and Ilio DiPaolo on the last Maple Leaf Gardens show of 1960. They lost the Championship early in 1961 after which Mills never came back to Toronto again. After retirement, Tiny became a sheriff in Minnesota.

== Championships and accomplishments ==
- 50th State Big Time Wrestling
  - NWA Hawaii Tag Team Championship (1 time) – with Stan Kowalski
- Alex Turk Promotions
  - Manitoba Tag Team Championship (1 time) - with Al Mills
- Central States Wrestling
  - NWA World Tag Team Championship (Central States version) (2 times) – with Al Mills (1), Pat O'Connor (1)
- Maple Leaf Wrestling
  - NWA Canadian Open Tag Team Championship (6 times) – with Al Mills (5) and Stan Kowalski (1)
- Mid-Atlantic Championship Wrestling
  - NWA Southern Tag Team Championship (Mid-Atlantic version) (1 time) – with Jim Austeri
- NWA Mid-America
  - NWA Southern Tag Team Championship (Mid-America version) (1 time) – with Jim Austeri
- NWA San Francisco
  - NWA World Tag Team Championship (San Francisco version) (1 time) – with Hombre Montana
- NWA Minneapolis Wrestling and Boxing Club / American Wrestling Association
  - AWA World Tag Team Championship (1 time) – with Stan Kowalski
  - NWA World Tag Team Championship (Minneapolis version) (2 times) – with Stan Kowalski
- Southwest Sports, Inc.
  - NWA Texas Tag Team Championship (1 time) – with Duke Keomuka
- Stampede Wrestling
  - NWA Canadian Tag Team Championship (Calgary version) (2 times) – with Al Mills
  - NWA International Tag Team Championship (Calgary version) (1 time) – with Jack Daniels
- Other titles
  - North Dakota Heavyweight Championship (1 time)
