= Herbie Smith =

Herbie Smith may refer to:

- Herbie Smith (cricketer) (1914–1997), Australian cricketer
- Herbie Smith (footballer) (1895–1959), Australian rules footballer

== See also ==
- Herbert Smith (disambiguation)
