= Yukon Eric =

American professional wrestler

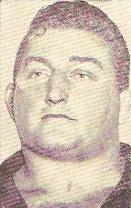

Personal information
- Born: Eric Holmback; April 16, 1916 Monroe, Washington, U.S.
- Died: January 16, 1965 (aged 48) Cartersville, Georgia, U.S.

Professional wrestling career
- Ring name: Yukon Eric
- Billed height: 6 ft 1 in (1.85 m)
- Billed weight: 275 lb (125 kg) – 300 lb (140 kg)
- Billed from: Fairbanks, Alaska
- Trained by: Man Mountain Dean
- Debut: January 22, 1942

Eric Holmback (April 16, 1916 – January 16, 1965) was an American professional wrestler, better known by the ring name Yukon Eric.

Holmback spent the majority of his career in Southern Ontario, Canada, where he won the NWA Canadian Open Tag Team Championship on two occasions with Whipper Billy Watson in 1955 and 1961 and the Montreal Athletic Commission's International Heavyweight Championship. He also won the NWA Texas Heavyweight Championship in 1948.

Holmback is best known for his 1952 match and subsequent feud with Killer Kowalski in which he lost his ear as a result of a botched knee drop. A rematch between the two the following year was the first televised wrestling match in Canada. Holmback continued to wrestle in Florida until he died by suicide in 1965.

== Professional wrestling career ==
After being trained by Man Mountain Dean, Holmback made his professional wrestling debut on January 22, 1942, using the ring name Yukon Eric. Yukon Eric utilised a strongman in-ring persona, and as part of the persona, he was announced as being from Fairbanks, Alaska, and always wore plaid wool shirts, worn open to show off his 66 in (170 cm) chest. He also was known for whipping his opponent into the ropes so that they would bounce back into his chest.

On January 30, 1948, Yukon Eric defeated Sonny Myers to win his first professional wrestling championship, the NWA Texas Heavyweight Championship. He held the championship for a week, before losing it to Miguel Guzmán on February 6. After this, he moved to Southern Ontario, where he spent the majority of his wrestling career. Two years later, on February 15, 1950, he defeated Bobby Managoff to win the Montreal Athletic Commission's International Heavyweight Championship.

During a match against Wladek Kowalski in 1952, Kowalski botched a knee drop, and legitimately severed part of Holmback's left ear. Afterward, Kowalski went to visit Holmback in the hospital, but began laughing at the bandages wrapped around Holmback's head. The incident cemented Kowalski as a heel (villainous character) and prompted Kowalski to rename himself Killer Kowalski. A rematch between the two on January 14, 1953, at the Montreal Forum was the first ever televised wrestling match in Canada.

He won the NWA Canadian Open Tag Team Championship twice with Whipper Billy Watson, with their first reign beginning on February 13, 1958, when they defeated Fritz Von Erich and Gene Kiniski. They lost the championship just over a month later to Stan and Reggie Lisowski on March 20, 1958. Later that year, he won the championship for the second time when he teamed with Dara Singh to defeat Stan and Reggie Lisowski on August 7, 1958. Three years later, on December 28, 1961, he won the NWA Canadian Open Tag Team Championship for the second time with Watson, and the third time overall, when the pair defeated John and Chris Tolos. Worked in Minnesota for American Wrestling Association from 1961 to 1962. He later moved to Florida, where he wrestled until the time of his death in 1965.

In 2007, Holmback was one of the honorees of the Cauliflower Alley Club's Posthumous Award, along with Betty Jo Hawkins.

== Personal life ==
Holmback grew up in Aberdeen, Washington, with three sisters. He attended Washington State College, where he played American football, lettering with the varsity team in 1938 as a sophomore.

== Death ==
After divorcing his wife and suffering financial problems, on January 16, 1965, Holmback drove to the church in Cartersville, Georgia, where he had gotten married, and took his own life by shooting himself in the mouth with a .22 caliber pistol. He was reported missing when he failed to show for matches in Jacksonville, Florida, and St. Petersburg, Florida. His body was found the next day in his car in the church parking lot. He was survived by his three children; two daughters and a son.

== Championships and accomplishments ==
- Cauliflower Alley Club
  - Posthumous Award (2007)
- National Wrestling Alliance
  - NWA World Six-Man Tag Team Championship (1 time) – with Pat O'Connor and Roy McClarity
  - NWA Canadian Open Tag Team Championship (3 times) – with Whipper Billy Watson (2) and Dara Singh (1)
  - NWA Texas Heavyweight Championship (1 time)
- Montreal Athletic Commission
  - MAC International Heavyweight Championship (1 time)

== See also ==
- List of premature professional wrestling deaths
- Lists of solved missing person cases
