= Hard Boiled Haggerty =

American professional wrestler and actor (1925–2004)

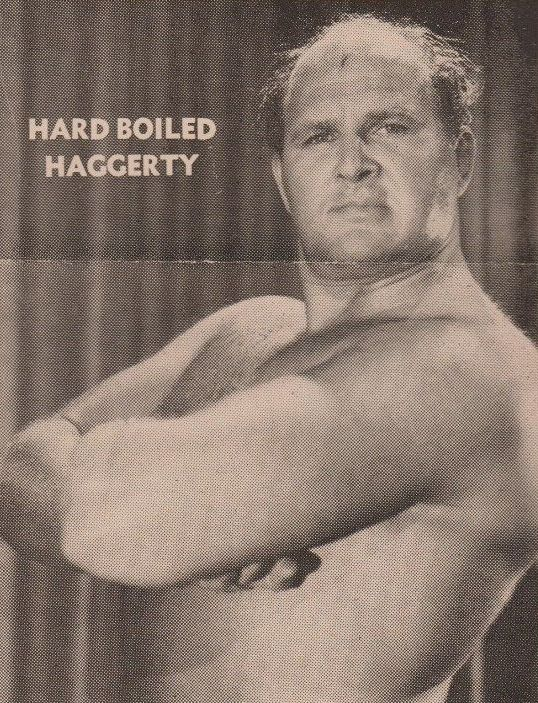
- Hard Boiled Haggerty - Sports Facts - 22 September 1952 Minneapolis Auditorium Wrestling Program

Personal information
- Born: Don Stansauk; April 2, 1925 Los Angeles, California, U.S.
- Died: January 27, 2004 (aged 78) Malibu, California, U.S.
- Education: Pasadena City College; University of Denver

Professional wrestling career
- Ring name(s): Don Sparrow; Hard Boiled Haggerty
- Billed height: 6 ft 1 in (185 cm)
- Billed weight: 285 lb (129 kg)
- Trained by: Danny Loos
- Debut: 1952
- Retired: 1972
- Military service
- Allegiance: United States
- Branch: United States Navy
- Conflicts: World War II (Pacific Theater)

Don Stansauk (April 2, 1925 – January 27, 2004) was an American professional wrestler and actor, known by his ring name, Hard Boiled Haggerty. He was previously a professional American football player, and he became a successful character actor after his wrestling career.

== Military service ==
Haggerty served in the U.S. Navy on the battleship the USS New Jersey during World War II.

== Football career ==
After attending Pasadena City College and the University of Denver, Stansauk was drafted by the Detroit Lions in the eighteenth round of the National Football League entry draft in 1950. He played defensive tackle and, after a season with the Lions, was traded to the Green Bay Packers. Over the next two seasons, Stansauk played in 15 games and recovered two fumbles.

== Professional wrestling career ==
As a wrestler, he made his wrestling debut under his real name in Green Bay, Wisconsin. From there, he moved to Chicago, where he was given the ring name Don Sparrow by promoter Karl Pojello, who thought that Stansauk "moved like a bird". He was later given the name "Hard Boiled Haggerty" by promoter Wally Karbo while wrestling in Minneapolis. Haggerty wrestled as a heel and was hated by the crowds because he portrayed an arrogant character.

Haggerty won his first championship on April 4, 1950, with NWA San Francisco, teaming with Ray Eckert to win the San Francisco version of the National Wrestling Alliance World Tag Team Championship. After dropping the title the following month, he teamed with Dutch Howlett to win the Midwest Wrestling Association American Tag Team Championship in June while wrestling in Ohio. After losing the belts, Haggerty continued wrestling in California. He won the NWA Pacific Coast Tag Team Championship twice, in 1951 and 1954, while teaming with Tom Rice. In 1955, Haggerty wrestled for World Class Championship Wrestling in Texas, winning the NWA Texas Tag Team Championship while teaming with Stu Gibson.

In 1956, Haggerty wrestled in Canada, winning the NWA Canadian Open Tag Team Championship while competing for Maple Leaf Wrestling. Later that year, he won his first singles title while wrestling for the International Wrestling Association in Montreal. He won the IWA World Heavyweight Championship on October 3, 1956, defeating Killer Kowalski for the belt. He held the title for less than a month, losing it back to Kowalski in a rematch.

Back in the United States, Haggerty formed a tag team with Kinji Shibuya in NWA Minneapolis. They won the Minneapolis version of the NWA World Tag Team Championship on April 22, 1958. They held the title for only a day, however, before it was returned to the previous champions because of concerns regarding the referee for the title match. Haggerty's next stop was Hawaii, where he won the NWA Hawaii Tag Team Championship while teaming with Bill Savage. They lost the belts to Lord James Blears and Herb Freeman, but Haggerty teamed with Butcher Vachon to regain the championship.

During the 1960s, Haggerty wrestled in the American Wrestling Association (AWA) and won several titles. From 1960 to 1961, he held the AWA World Tag Team Championship with three different partners. During his first reign, his partner, Len Montana broke his leg. As a result, Haggerty chose Gene Kiniski as his new partner. Shortly after he began teaming with Kiniski, Haggerty challenged his partner for the AWA United States Heavyweight Championship and took the belt from Kiniski. Haggerty and Kiniski continued to wrestle as a team, and they held the belts together twice. The team split up, however, on August 8, 1961, after Haggerty's interference accidentally cost Kiniski a match against Verne Gagne. The team vacated the championship, and a singles match between the two was scheduled to determine the fate of the title. Haggerty and Kiniski wrestled a singles match. Haggerty won the match and the belts, and he chose Bob Geigel as his new partner.

The following year saw Haggerty wrestling for the NWA once more. Haggerty teamed up with Kiniski again to win the Vancouver version of the NWA Pacific Coast Tag Team Championship. They won the belts twice and, during their second reign, held the title until it was retired by the promotion.

Haggerty returned to Hawaii to wrestle with the NWA, and he succeeded in taking the NWA Hawaii Heavyweight Championship from Neff Maivia on February 6, 1964. He held the belt for over two months but lost it back to Maivia in a rematch. While wrestling with the Los Angeles–based Worldwide Wrestling Associates (WWA) later that year, he won his first of four WWA World Tag Team Championships. He teamed with The Destroyer to win the title twice in 1964. In Hawaii again the following year, Haggerty won his final singles title, taking the NWA Hawaii United States Championship from Enrique Torres on February 24, 1965. He held the belt until September 15 that year, when he lost the title to King Curtis Iaukea. He later returned to Los Angeles, where he teamed with El Shareef to win the WWA World Tag Team Championship twice more.

After retiring from wrestling, Haggerty went into acting and appeared in several movies. He also had a role in several television shows, including Adam-12, Kung Fu, Get Smart, Starsky and Hutch, Columbo, Baretta, Happy Days, The Bob Newhart Show, The Love Boat, The Incredible Hulk, The Fall Guy, and Crazy Like a Fox.

He was a member of the Cauliflower Alley Club and earned one of their highest honors in 1993, the Iron Mike Mazurki Award. While living at Pacific Palisades, Don Haggerty (as he was then known) was an ardent member of Elysium Institute in Topanga.

On June 20, 2003, Haggerty was involved in a car accident in Los Angeles and suffered a broken neck and other injuries. On January 27, 2004, Haggerty died at his home in Malibu, California. His interment was at Forest Lawn - Hollywood Hills Cemetery.

== Partial filmography ==
- P.J. (1968) – Ape (uncredited)
- Paint Your Wagon (1969) – Steve Bull
- A Dream of Kings (1969) – Turk
- Adam-12 (TV Series) (1971) episode S4:E9 "Annversary" - Dobish (a paralyzed former Wrestler) (creditec as H.G. Hagferty)
- Bogard (1974) – Moose
- The Wrestler (1974) – Bartender
- Foxy Brown (1974) – Brandi
- Earthquake (1974) – Pool Shark
- The Four Deuces (1975) – Mickey Navarro
- Framed (1975) – Bickford
- Stunts (1977) – Redneck
- Walking Tall: Final Chapter (1977) – Bulow
- The One and Only (1978) – Captain Nemo
- When Every Day Was the Fourth of July (1978, TV Movie) – Casey
- Deathsport (1978) – Jailor
- Buck Rogers in the 25th Century (1979) – Tigerman #2
- The Muppet Movie (1979) – Lumberjack
- The Big Brawl (1980) – Kiss
- The Incredible Hulk (1981, TV Series) – Gregor Potemkin
- Micki & Maude (1984) – Barkhas Guillory
- Hollywood Vice Squad (1986) – Tank
- Rad (1986) – Sgt. Smith
- Million Dollar Mystery (1987) – Awful Abdul

== Championships and accomplishments ==
- American Wrestling Association
  - AWA United States Heavyweight Championship (1 time)
  - AWA World Tag Team Championship (3 times) – with Lenny Montana (1) and replacement partner Gene Kiniski (2), and Bob Geigel (1)
- Cauliflower Alley Club
  - Iron Mike Mazurki Award (1993)
  - Other honoree (1992)
- International Wrestling Association
  - IWA World Heavyweight Championship (1 time)
- Maple Leaf Wrestling
  - NWA Canadian Open Tag Team Championship (1 time) – with Dick Hutton
- NWA Los Angeles
  - NWA "Beat the Champ" Television Championship (1 time)
- Mid-Pacific Promotions
  - NWA Hawaii Heavyweight Championship (1 time)
  - NWA Hawaii Tag Team Championship (2 times) – with Bill Savage (1) and Butcher Vachon (1)
  - NWA United States Heavyweight Championship (Hawaii version) (1 time)
- Midwest Wrestling Association (Ohio)
  - MWA American Tag Team Championship (1 time) – with Dutch Howlett
- NWA All-Star Wrestling
  - NWA Pacific Coast Tag Team Championship (Vancouver version) (2 times) – with Gene Kiniski
- NWA San Francisco
  - NWA Pacific Coast Tag Team Championship (San Francisco version) (2 times) – with Tom Rice
  - NWA World Tag Team Championship (San Francisco version) (1 time) – with Ray Eckert
- World Class Championship Wrestling
  - NWA Texas Tag Team Championship (1 time) – with Stu Gibson
- Worldwide Wrestling Associates
  - WWA World Tag Team Championship (4 times) – with The Destroyer (2), and El Shereef (2)

== See also ==
- List of gridiron football players who became professional wrestlers
