= NWA World Tag Team Championship (Minneapolis version) =

Professional wrestling tag team championship

Details
- Promotion: NWA Minneapolis Wrestling and Boxing Club
- Date established: January 8, 1957
- Date retired: August 1960
Statistics
- First champions: Tiny Mills and Al Mills
- Most reigns: As team: The Kalmikoffs (Ivan and Karol Kalmikoff) (4 times); Individual: Verne Gagne (4 times)
- Longest reign: Murder Inc. (Stan Kowalski and Tiny Mills) (193 days)
- Shortest reign: Herb and Seymour Freeman (7 days)

From January 8, 1957, through August 1960 the NWA Minneapolis Wrestling and Boxing Club promoted the Minneapolis version of the NWA World Tag Team Championship as the main professional wrestling championship for tag teams on their shows held in and around Minneapolis. The Minneapolis Wrestling and Boxing Club was a member of the National Wrestling Alliance (NWA) from its formation in 1948, but left the group in 1960 to help form the American Wrestling Association (AWA). The NWA Board of Directors allowed each member, referred to as a NWA territory, to create and control its own individual "NWA World Tag Team Championship" to be defended within its territory. At one point in 1957, no less than 13 different versions of the NWA World Tag Team Championship were recognized across the United States.^{[Championships]} As with all professional wrestling championships, this championship was not contested for in competitive matches, but in matches with predetermined outcomes to maintain the illusion that professional wrestling is a competitive sport.

Records indicate that brothers Al and Tiny Mills were recognized as NWA World Tag Team Champions in Minnesota in June 1953, as they lost the championship to Tony Baillargeon and Pat O'Connor on June 20, 1953. The records did not indicate how the Mills brothers won the championship, nor is it clear what happened after Baillargeon and O'Connor won the championship. Records of an active NWA World Tag Team Championship in the Minneapolis area do not indicate new champions until January 8, 1957, when The Kalmikoffs (Ivan and Karol Kalmikoff) defeated Fritz Von Erich and Karl Von Schober in the finals of a tournament to win the championship. In 1960 the Minneapolis promotion left the NWA to found the AWA, which meant that the last holders of the NWA championship, Murder Inc. (Stan Kowalski and Tiny Mills), became the first AWA World Tag Team Champions as all NWA-branded championships were abandoned.

The Kalmikoffs held the championship a total of four times, the record both for teams and for Ivan and Karol Kalmikoffs as individuals. Verne Gagne shares the record of four championship reigns, with three different partners: Leo Nomellini, Bronko Nagurski, and Butch Levy. Due to lack of details surrounding various championship changes, it is uncertain which team had the shortest reign; Herb and Seymore Freeman's reign of seven days is the shortest confirmed reign, but the possibility exists that another team had a shorter reign. The last reign was also the longest reign, as Murder Inc. held the championship for 193 days before being awarded the AWA World Tag Team Championship.

== Title history ==
Key
| No. | Overall reign number |
| Reign | Reign number for the specific champion |
| Days | Number of days held |

| No. | Champion | Championship change | | | Reign statistics | | Notes | Ref. |
| No. | Champion | Date | Event | Location | Reign | Days | Notes | Ref. |
|---|---|---|---|---|---|---|---|---|
| 1 | Al Mills and Tiny | June 10, 1953 | House show | (Note: The location of the match was not captured as part of the championship documentation.) | 1 | (Note: The date the championship was won and lost has not been documented which means the championship reign lasted anywhere between 1 day and 20 days.) | Records are unclear on who they defeated to win the championship. | |
| 2 | Pat O'Connor and Tony Baillargeon | June 20, 1953 | House show | Saint Paul, MN | 1 | (Note: The date the championship was lost has not been documented which means the championship reign lasted anywhere between 1 day and 1,297 days.) | | |
Championship history is unrecorded from June 20, 1953 to January 8, 1957.
| 3 | The Kalmikoffs (Ivan Kalmikoff and Karol Kalmikoff) | January 8, 1957 | House show | Minneapolis, MN | 1 | 49 | The Kalmikoffs defeated Fritz Von Erich and Karl Von Schober in a tournament final to win the vacant championship. | |
| 4 | The Brunetti Brothers (Guy Brunetti and Joe Brunetti) | February 26, 1957 | House show | Minneapolis, MN | 1 | 100 | | |
| 5 | The Kalmikoffs (Ivan Kalmikoff and Karol Kalmikoff) | June 6, 1957 | House show | Minneapolis, MN | 2 | 68 | | |
| 6 | Kinji Shibuya and Mitsu Arakawa | August 13, 1957 | House show | Minneapolis, MN | 1 | 105 | | |
| 7 | The Brunetti Brothers (Guy Brunetti and Joe Brunetti) | November 26, 1957 | House show | Minneapolis, MN | 2 | 14 | | |
| 8 | The Atomic Blonds (Chet Wallick and Johnny Valentine) | December 10, 1957 | House show | Minneapolis, MN | 1 | 16 | | |
| 9 | Bronko Nagurski and Verne Gagne | December 26, 1957 | House show | Minneapolis, MN | 1 | 86 | | |
| 10 | The Gallagher Brothers (Doc Gallagher and Mike Gallagher) | March 22, 1958 | House show | Saint Paul, MN | 1 | 54 | Hard Boiled Haggerty and Kinji Shibuya defeated the Gallaghers on April 22, 1958 but the championship was returned a week later due to questionable decisions by referee Ilio DiPaolo. | |
| 11 | Leo Nomellini and Verne Gagne (2) | May 15, 1958 | House show | Minneapolis, MN | 1 | (Note: The date the championship was lost has not been documented which means the championship reign lasted anywhere between 1 day and −319 days.) | | |
| 12 | The Gallagher Brothers (Doc Gallagher and Mike Gallagher) | June 3, 1958 | House show | | 2 | (Note: The date the championship was won has not been documented which means the championship reign lasted anywhere between 1 day and 46 days.) | | |
| 13 | Fritz Von Erich and Hans Hermann | July 1, 1958 | House show | Minneapolis, MN | 1 | (Note: The date the championship was vacated has not been documented which means the championship reign lasted anywhere between 1 day and 151 days.) | | |
| — | Vacated | September 2, 1958 | — | — | — | — | The championship was vacated for undocumented reasons. | |
| 14 | The Lisowski Brothers; Reggie and Stan Lisowski | November 5, 1958 | House show | | 1 | (Note: The date the championship won lost has not been documented which means the championship reign lasted anywhere between 46 days and 75 days.) | The Lisowski Brothers won a tournament to win the vacant championship. | |
| 15 | Herb Freeman and Seymour Freeman | January 15, 1959 | House show | Minneapolis, MN | 1 | 7 | | |
| 16 | The Lisowski Brothers; Reggie and Stan Lisowski | January 22, 1959 | House show | Minneapolis, MN | 2 | 42 | | |
| 17 | The Kalmikoffs (Ivan Kalmikoff and Karol Kalmikoff) | March 5, 1959 | House show | Minneapolis, MN | 3 | 36 | In April 10, 1959 Ivan gave his half to Baron Gattoni after being injured. | |
| 18 | Butch Levy and Verne Gagne (3) | April 28, 1959 | House show | Minneapolis, MN | 1 | (Note: The date the championship was lost has not been documented which means the championship reign lasted anywhere between 85 days and 115 days.) | | |
| 19 | The Kalmikoffs (Ivan Kalmikoff and Karol Kalmikoff) | June 3, 1959 | House show | | 4 | (Note: The date the championship was won has not been documented which means the championship reign lasted anywhere between 4 days and 43 days.) | The Kalmikoffs were awarded the championship because Verne Gagne was on tour outside the territory. | |
| 20 | Butch Levy (2) and Leo Nomellini (2) | July 14, 1959 | House show | Minneapolis, MN | 1 | (Note: The date the championship was vacated has not been documented which means the championship reign lasted anywhere between 1 day and 170 days.) | | |
| — | Vacated | September 2, 1959 | — | — | — | — | The championship was vacated when Leo Nomellini returned to play for the San Francisco 49ers in 1959. | |
| 21 | Murder Incorporated (Stan Kowalski and Tiny Mills (2)) | March 5, 1960 | | N/A | 1 | 193 | Murder Incorporated claimed to be International Tag Team champions in 1959, awarded the world title on this date. The Minneapolis promotion withdraws from NWA and forms American Wrestling Association in May but initially recognize NWA champions. | |
| 22 | Leo Nomellini (3) and Verne Gagne (4) | July 19, 1960 | House show | Minneapolis, MN | 2 | (Note: The date the championship was lost has not been documented which means the championship reign lasted anywhere between 13 days and 43 days.) | | |
| 23 | Murder Incorporated (Stan Kowalski and Tiny Mills (3)) | August 16, 1960 | House show | Minneapolis, MN | 2 | (Note: The exact date the AWA stopped promoting the NWA Tag Team Championship is unclear, leaving length of the reign too uncertain to calculate.) | Murder Incorporated were awarded the championship when Leo Nomellini returned to the NFL. Became the first AWA World Tag Team Champions when AWA stopped recognizing NWA champions. | |
| — | Deactivated | October 4, 1960 | — | — | — | — | AWA stopped promoting the NWA Tag Team Championship. | |

== Team reigns by combined length ==
Key

| Symbol | Meaning |
|---|---|
| ¤ | The exact length of at least one title reign is uncertain, so the shortest possible length is used. |

| Rank | Team | No. of reigns | Combined days |
|---|---|---|---|
| 1 | Murder, Inc. (Stan Kowalski and Tiny Mills) | 2 | 281¤ |
| 2 | The Kalmikoffs (Ivan and Karol Kalmikoff) | 4 | 174¤ |
| 3 | Joe and Guy Brunetti | 2 | 114 |
| 4 | Mitsu Arakawa and Kinji Shibuya | 1 | 105 |
| 5 | Verne Gagne and Bronko Nagurski | 1 | 86 |
| 6 | Verne Gagne and Butch Levy | 1 | 85¤ |
| 7 | Gallagher Brothers (Doc and Mike Gallagher) | 2 | 55¤ |
| 8 | Atomic Blonds (Johnny Valentine and Chet Wallick) | 1 | 16 |
| 9 | Verne Gagne and Leo Nomellini | 2 | 14¤ |
| 10 | Herb and Seymour Freeman | 1 | 7 |
| 11 | Butch Levy and Leo Nomellini | 1 | 1¤ |
| 12 | Hans Hermann and Fritz Von Erich | 1 | 1¤ |
| 13 | Tiny and Al Mills | 1 | 1¤ |
| 14 | Tony Baillargeon and Pat O'Connor | 1 | 1¤ |

== Individual reigns by combined length ==
Key

| Symbol | Meaning |
|---|---|
| ¤ | The exact length of at least one title reign is uncertain, so the shortest possible length is used. |

| Rank | Wrestler | No. of reigns | Combined days |
|---|---|---|---|
| 1 | Tiny Mills | 3 | 282¤ |
| 2 | Stan Kowalski | 2 | 281¤ |
| 3 | Verne Gagne | 4 | 185¤ |
| 4 | Ivan Kalmikoff | 4 | 174¤ |
| 4 | Karol Kalmikoff | 4 | 174¤ |
| 6 | Guy Brunetti | 2 | 114 |
| 6 | Joe Brunetti | 2 | 114 |
| 8 | Kinji Shibuya | 1 | 105 |
| 8 | Mitsu Arakawa | 1 | 105 |
| 10 | Bronko Nagurski | 1 | 86 |
| 10 | Butch Levy | 2 | 86¤ |
| 12 | Doc Mike Gallagher | 2 | 55¤ |
| 12 | Mike Gallagher | 2 | 55¤ |
| 14 | Chet Wallick | 1 | 16 |
| 14 | Johnny Valentine | 1 | 16 |
| 16 | Leo Nomellini | 3 | 15¤ |
| 17 | Herb Freeman | 1 | 7 |
| 17 | Seymour Freeman | 1 | 7 |
| 19 | Tony Baillargeon | 1 | 1¤ |
| 19 | Hans Hermann | 1 | 1¤ |
| 19 | Al Mills | 1 | 1¤ |
| 19 | Fritz Von Erich | 1 | 1¤ |
| 19 | Pat O'Connor | 1 | 1¤ |

== Concurrent championships ==
Sources for 13 simultaneous NWA World Tag Team Championships

- NWA World Tag Team Championship (Los Angeles version)
- NWA World Tag Team Championship (San Francisco version)
- NWA World Tag Team Championship (Central States version)
- NWA World Tag Team Championship (Chicago version)
- NWA World Tag Team Championship (Buffalo Athletic Club version)
- NWA World Tag Team Championship (Georgia version)
- NWA World Tag Team Championship (Iowa/Nebraska version)
- NWA World Tag Team Championship (Indianapolis version)
- NWA World Tag Team Championship (Salt Lake Wrestling Club version)
- NWA World Tag Team Championship (Amarillo version)
- NWA World Tag Team Championship (Minneapolis version)
- NWA World Tag Team Championship (Texas version)
- NWA World Tag Team Championship (Mid-America version)
