= Stan Kowalski =

American professional wrestler (1926–2017)

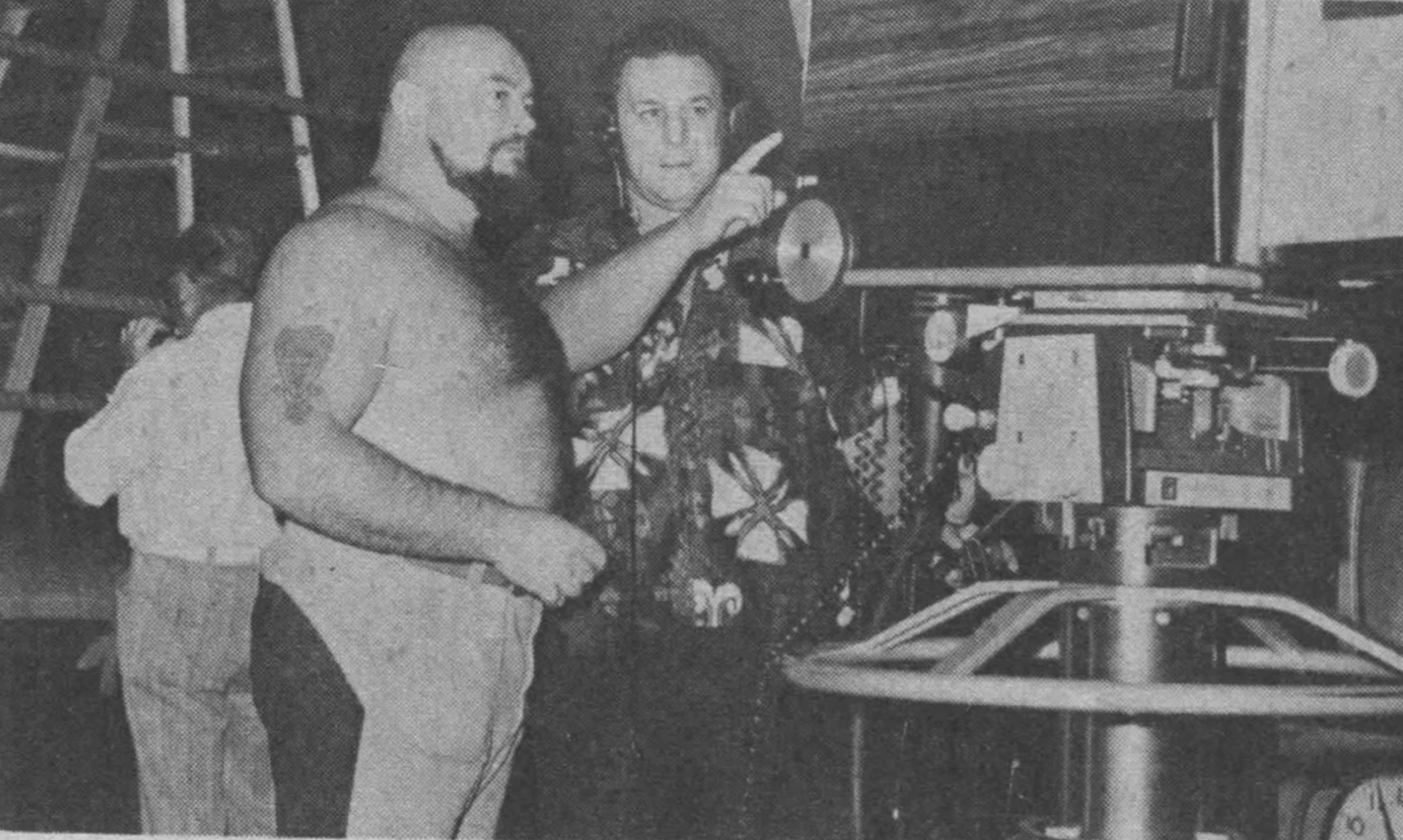
- Kowalski (right) looking through a TV camera with wrestler Ivan Koloff (left), circa 1973.

Personal information
- Born: Bert Smith; May 13, 1926 Minneapolis, Minnesota, United States
- Died: October 20, 2017 (aged 91)
- Education: University of Minnesota

Professional wrestling career
- Ring name(s): The Big K Buddy Marco; Krusher Kowalski; Slamming Sammy Slivers; Ivan Kola; Krippler Karl Kovacs
- Billed height: 6 ft 2.5 in (189 cm)
- Billed weight: 290 lb (132 kg)
- Trained by: Sandor Szabo
- Debut: 1948
- Retired: 1976
- Military service
- Allegiance: United States
- Branch: United States Navy
- Rank: Gunner's mate
- Units: USS Plaice, USS Bashaw, USS Barb
- Conflicts: World War II (Asiatic-Pacific Theater)

Stan Kowalski (born Bert Smith; May 13, 1926 – October 20, 2017) was an American professional wrestler who was one half of the tag team Murder Incorporated with partner Tiny Mills in the American Wrestling Association (AWA) from 1960 to 1975.

== Early life ==
Kowalski wrestled and played football at North Community High School. At age 17, under an assumed name, he joined the United States Navy and served in the Asiatic-Pacific Theater of World War II on three submarines (USS Plaice, USS Bashaw, and USS Barb) for three-and-a-half years as a gunner's mate. He enrolled at the University of Minnesota after the war. He joined the wrestling team, where he met local promoter Joe Pazandak, the University's unofficial assistant wrestling coach. He turned down a chance to play football for the Green Bay Packers in 1950.

== Professional wrestling career ==
Kowalski turned to professional wrestling, debuting as Buddy Marco for a NWA promotion run by Tony Stecher. He traveled to Los Angeles, where he trained with Sandor Szabo. In 1955, promoter Jack Pfefer changed his ring name to Krusher Kowalski; Kowalski was a family name.

He later formed a tag team with Canadian wrestler Tiny Mills as Murder Incorporated. They wrestled together in Canada, Japan, Australia, New Zealand, and the United States. They won the Minneapolis version of the NWA World Tag Team Championships twice while working for the NWA Minneapolis Wrestling and Boxing Club. When that promotion became the American Wrestling Association (AWA) in 1960, Mills and Kowalski became the first AWA World Tag Team Champions. They also won the Canadian Open Tag Team Championship, defeating Billy "Whipper" Watson and Ilio DiPaolo in 1960. They lost the championship early in 1961. Later, he managed Ivan Koloff.

In 1969, he has a brief appearance in an Ohio promotion, Ohio Wrestling Classics. Then, in 1970, he went to New York to wrestle in the World Wide Wrestling Federation (WWWF) as Krippler Karl Kovacs. In Pennsylvania, Kowalski and Bruno Sammartino set a record attendance and gate of $86,000.

During the later years of his career, he continued to work for the American Wrestling Association until retiring from wrestling in 1976.

== Personal life ==
After retiring from professional wrestling, Kowalski owned a night club with wrestler Blackjack Daniels, worked as a police officer, union negotiator, and business agent. He resided in Minneapolis, Minnesota, where he was active in charities, fundraisers, and speaking engagements. He volunteered with the United Way and helped homeless veterans. Kowalski was married to his wife Cleo since 1961 and had two children, a son Scott Smith, and daughter Stacy Smith. He lost part of his colon due to cancer in 2006. He died on October 20, 2017.

Kowalski received a Lifetime Achievement Award from the Improved Order of Red Men in 2016. In addition, the Veterans of Foreign Wars presents an award named in his honor.

== Championships and accomplishments ==
- 50th State Big Time Wrestling
  - NWA Hawaii Tag Team Championship (1 time) – with Tiny Mills
- Cauliflower Alley Club
  - Honoree (2000)
- Central States Wrestling
  - NWA Iowa Tag Team Championship ( 1 time ) - with Jack Daniels
- Maple Leaf Wrestling
  - NWA Canadian Open Tag Team Championship (1 time) – with Tiny Mills
- NWA Minneapolis Wrestling and Boxing Club / American Wrestling Association
  - AWA World Tag Team Championship (1 time) – with Tiny Mills
  - NWA World Tag Team Championship (Minneapolis version) (2 times) – with Tiny Mills
