= Herbert Smith (disambiguation) =

Herbert Smith is a law firm based in London.

Herbert, Herbie, or Herb Smith may also refer to:

== Academics ==
- Herbert Smith (mineralogist) (1872–1953), British mineralogist
- Herbert Huntingdon Smith (1851–1919), American naturalist
- G. Herbert Smith, American educator

== Arts ==
- Herbert Greenhough Smith (1855–1935), first editor of the Strand Magazine
- Herbert Smith (producer) (1901–1986), British film producer and director
- Herbert Tyson Smith (1883–1972), English sculptor
- Herbert Smith, regular on the BBC Radio comedy The Clitheroe Kid
- Herbert Smith (art director) (1916–2006), production designer for the 1965 movie The Hill

== Sports ==
- Herbert Smith (footballer, born 1877) (1877–1951), English international footballer, gold medalist in the 1908 Olympics
- Herbert Smith (half-back), English footballer for Port Vale
- Herbert Smith (forward), English footballer for Bradford City
- Herbert Smith (rugby league), English rugby league footballer of the 1920s for Great Britain, England, Bradford Northern, and Halifax
- Herbert Smith (rugby league, born 1915) (1915–?), English rugby league footballer of the 1930s and 1940s for Batley Shamrocks, Castleford, Bramley, Batley, and Bradford Northern
- Herbert Smith (baseball), Negro league baseball player
- Herbert L. Smith, American football player and coach
- Herbie Smith (cricketer) (1914–1997), Australian cricketer
- Herbie Smith (footballer) (1895–1959), Australian rules footballer
- Herb Smith (1906–?), American baseball player

== Other ==
- Herbert Smith (trade unionist) (1862–1938), British miners' union leader; subject of The Man in the Cap by Jack Lawson
- Herbert Smith (politician) (1871–1935), Australian politician
- Sir Herbert Smith, 1st Baronet (1872–1943), English carpet manufacturer
- Herbert Smith (aircraft designer) (1889–1977), British aircraft designer
- Herbert H. Smith (1898–?), American politician
- Herbert D. Smith (1926–2011), attorney in Oklahoma
- Herbert Smith (businessman), British businessman in Hong Kong

== See also ==
- Bert Smith (disambiguation)
