= NWA Pacific Coast Tag Team Championship (Vancouver version) =

Professional wrestling championship

The Vancouver version of the NWA Pacific Coast Tag Team Championship was the major tag team title in its National Wrestling Alliance-affiliated territory, NWA All-Star Wrestling, from 1961 until 1962, when it was replaced by the Vancouver version of the NWA Canadian Tag Team Championship.

== Title history ==
Key
No.	Overall reign number
Reign	Reign number for the specific champion
Days	Number of days held

No.	Champion	Championship change			Reign statistics		Notes	Ref.
No.	Champion	Date	Event	Location	Reign	Days	Notes	Ref.
1	Lou Thesz and The Outlaw	1961	NWA All-Star show	N/A	1	N/A	Records unclear how they became champions	
—	Vacated	February 1961	—	—	—	—	Championship vacated for undocumented reasons	
2	The Outlaw (2) and Pancho Pico	February 20, 1961	NWA All-Star show	Vancouver, BC	1	14	Defeated Guy and Joe Brunetti in tournament final	
3	Guy and Joe Brunetti	March 6, 1961	NWA All-Star show	Vancouver, BC	1	14		
4	Mitsu Arakawa and Mr. Moto	March 20, 1961	NWA All-Star show	Vancouver, BC	1	7		
5	Guy and Joe Brunetti	March 27, 1961	NWA All-Star show	Vancouver, BC	2	148		
6	Killer Kowalski and Ox Anderson	August 22, 1961	NWA All-Star show	Vancouver, BC	1	N/A		
—	Vacated	September 1961	—	—	—	—	Anderson left the promotion	
7	The Kalmikoffs (Ivan and Karol Kalmikoff)	October 2, 1961	NWA All-Star show	Vancouver, BC	1	35	Defeated Whipper Billy Watson and Roy McClarty in tournament final	
8	Whipper Billy Watson and Roy McClarty	November 6, 1961	NWA All-Star show	Vancouver, BC	1	77		
9	Gene Kiniski and Killer Kowalski (2)	January 22, 1962	NWA All-Star show	Vancouver, BC	1	42		
10	Whipper Billy Watson (2) and Mr. Kleen	March 5, 1962	NWA All-Star show	Vancouver, BC	1	21		
11	Gene Kiniski (2) and Hard Boiled Haggerty	March 26, 1962	NWA All-Star show	Vancouver, BC	1	105		
12	Whipper Billy Watson (3) and Bearcat Wright	July 9, 1962	NWA All-Star show	Vancouver, BC	1	29		
13	Gene Kiniski (3) and Hard Boiled Haggerty	August 7, 1962	NWA All-Star show	Vancouver, BC	2	N/A		
—	Deactivated	November 1962	—	—	—	—	Replaced by Vancouver version of the NWA Canadian Tag Team title	
