= Hubert Smith =

Hubert Smith may refer to:

- Hubie Smith, basketball coach in Tennessee.
- Hubert Smith (cricketer), Australian cricketer
- Hubert Llewellyn Smith, British civil servant
- Hubert Smith, musician in Bermuda
- Hubert Smith, character in The Black Cat (1941 film)
- J. Hubert Smith, Arizona politician

== See also ==
- Hubert Shirley-Smith (1901–1981), British civil engineer
- Bert Smith (disambiguation)
- Hubert Smithers
