= Butch Levy =

American football player and professional wrestler (1921–1999)

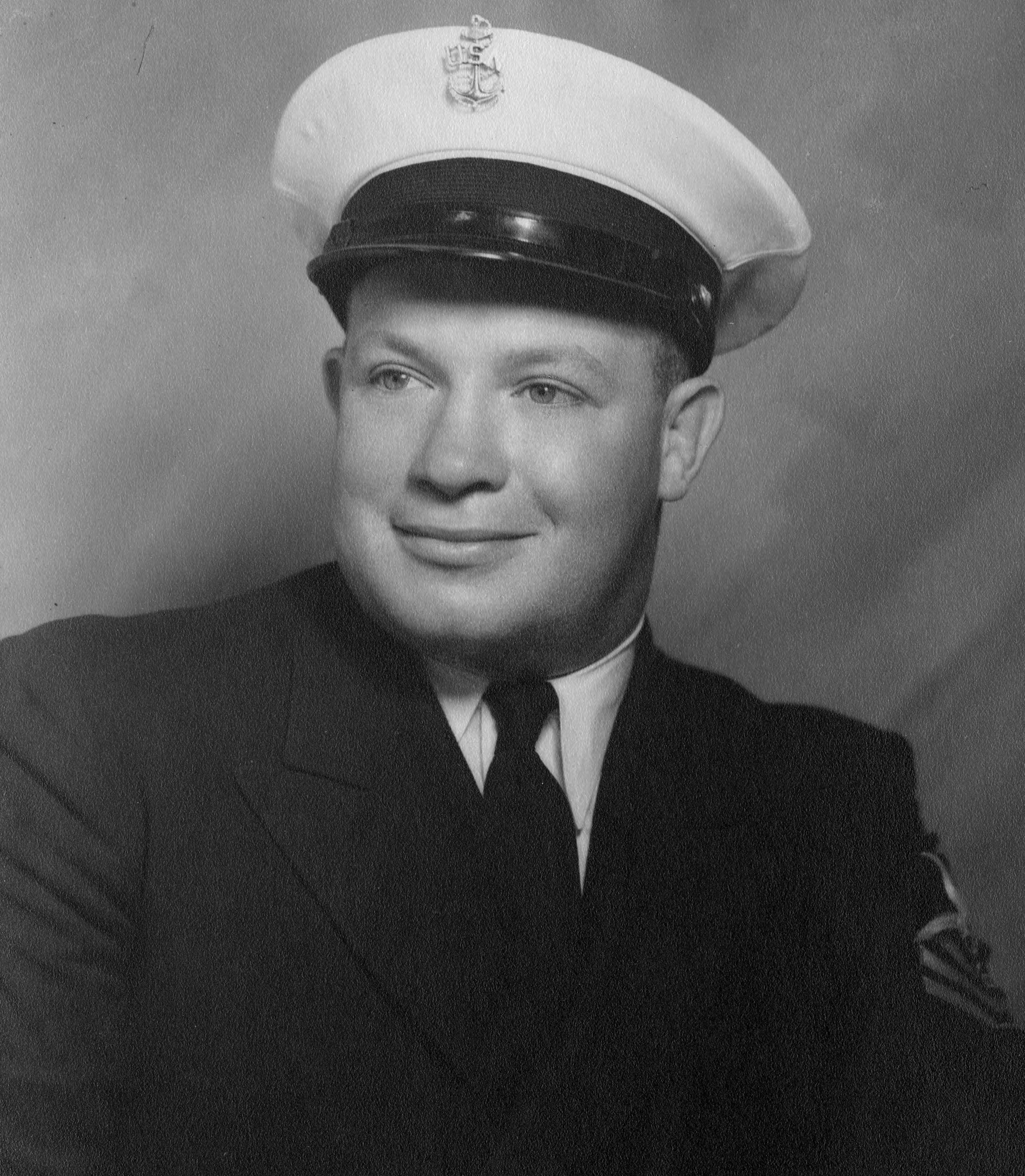

No. 64, 76, 35
- Position: Guard

Personal information
- Born: February 19, 1921; Minneapolis, Minnesota, U.S.
- Died: February 9, 1999 (aged 77); Minneapolis, Minnesota, U.S.
- Listed height: 6 ft 0 in (1.83 m)
- Listed weight: 256 lb (116 kg)

Career information
- High school: West (Minneapolis)
- College: Minnesota
- NFL draft: 1942: 4th round, 27th overall pick

Career history
- Cleveland/Los Angeles Rams (1945–1946); Los Angeles Dons (1947–1948)

Awards and highlights
- NFL champion (1945); First-team All-AAFC (1948); 2× National champion (1940, 1941); First-team All-Big Ten (1941)

Career NFL + AAFC statistics
- Games played: 42
- Games started: 25
- Stats at Pro Football Reference

Medal record

Collegiate Wrestling

Representing the Minnesota Golden Gophers

NCAA Championships
Gold medal – first place	1941 Bethlehem	Heavyweight

Leonard Bernard "Butch" or "Len" Levy (February 19, 1921 – February 9, 1999) was an American football player, amateur wrestler, and professional wrestler. The 1941 NCAA heavyweight wrestling champion and 1942 AAU champion, he was selected by the Cleveland Rams of the National Football League (NFL) in the fourth round of the 1942 NFL draft. He instead enlisted in the United States Navy and played for one of that branch's organized military service teams, the Great Lakes Bluejackets.

Following his discharge from the Navy, Levy played two seasons for the NFL's Rams, winning the NFL Championship in 1945. He then played for the Los Angeles Dons of the All-America Football Conference (AAFC) from 1947 to 1948, earning First-team All-AAFC honors in the latter year — his final season of professional football.

Following his football career, Levy was a professional wrestler in the American Wrestling Association (AWA), winning the NWA World Tag Team Championship twice.

== Early life ==
Levy was born to Abraham Levy and Rose Shapiro on February 19, 1921, in Minneapolis, Minnesota. Butch's grandparents were Jewish immigrants from Lithuania and Russia.

Levy attended West High School in Minneapolis, where he won a total of twelve letters in wrestling, football, baseball and hockey. He was the 1937 and 1938 Minnesota high school and Northwest AAU heavyweight wrestling champion.

== College career ==
Levy played football for the Minnesota Golden Gophers from 1939 to 1941. The Gophers won the national championship in 1940 and 1941, finishing with an 8–0 record both seasons while Levy earned All-American honors both years. He garnered All-Big Ten first-team recognition from the Associated Press in his senior year in 1941. He was named to the Chicago College All-Star Game in 1942.

Levy participated in collegiate wrestling, winning the NCAA heavyweight championship in 1941, becoming the first Golden Gopher to do so and also earned All-American honors the same year. He suffered a broken foot midway through the 1941–42 season, causing him to miss the rest of the year. He won the AAU heavyweight championship in wrestling in 1942. Levy also lettered in baseball for the Golden Gophers in 1942. He graduated with a bachelor's degree in economics.

He was inducted into the University of Minnesota's "M" Club Hall of Fame in 1994.

== Professional football career ==
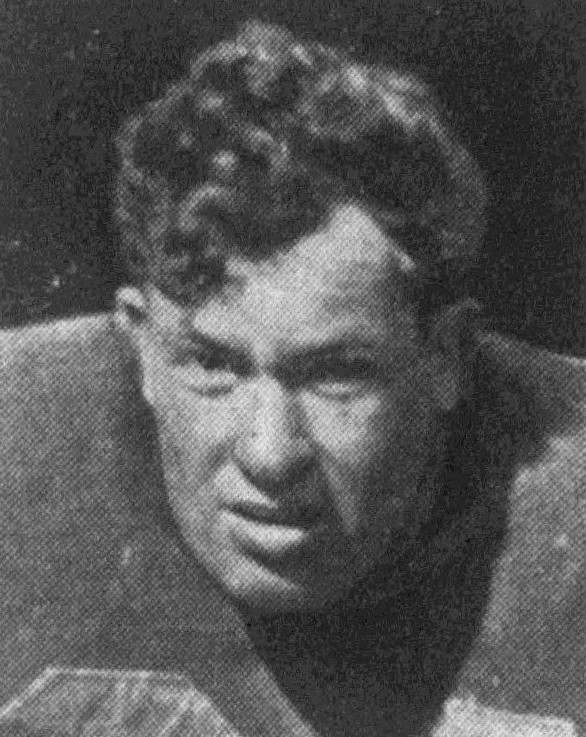
Levy, circa 1947

Levy was selected by the Cleveland Rams of the NFL in the fourth round with the 27th overall pick in the 1942 NFL draft.

He then spent three years in the United States Navy during World War II. Initially disallowed from joining the military due to poor eyesight, he was allowed entry after agreeing to play football for the Great Lakes Navy Bluejackets, one of the organized military service football teams.

Levy, who played guard, was regarded as a large lineman by the standards of his era, standing 6'0" and weighing 260 pounds. He played in seven games for the Rams during the 1945 season. The Rams won the NFL Championship against the Washington Redskins on December 16, 1945.

When the Rams moved to Los Angeles in 1946, Levy followed, signing a one-year contract in March 1946 and appearing in ten games for the team in 1946.

He then played in 25 games for the Los Angeles Dons of the All-America Football Conference (AAFC) from 1947 to 1948, earning All-AAFC first-team honors in his final year. He retired from professional football at the end of the 1948 season.

== Professional wrestling career ==
Levy became a professional wrestler after his football career. He participated in the NWA Minneapolis Boxing & Wrestling Club / American Wrestling Association, wrestling under the ring name of "Butch Levy". He was a two-time NWA World Tag Team champion, first with Verne Gagne and later with Leo Nomellini, both of whom also played for the Minnesota Golden Gophers. Levy met amateur wrestler Pat O'Connor from New Zealand during a wrestling tour in Pat's home country in 1950. Levy then trained him to be a professional wrestler. O'Connor later won the AWA World Heavyweight Championship and NWA World Heavyweight Championship. alte rin his career worked for American Wrestling Association in Minnesota. Retired in 1967.

== Personal life ==
Levy married Loretta "Lucky" Bellson in January 1944 and they had three children. Lucky died in 1997. Len was Jewish and was active in the Jewish community. He worked in his father's plumbing business before selling it in the late 1960s and becoming an insurance agent for Bankers Life. Levy became a stockbroker in the 1970s and later worked for Piper Jaffray. He was also a securities salesman. He suffered a brain tumor in 1991. Levy's son Rand said Butch was "supposed to die" but "people were just astounded to see him a year later on the golf course."

Levy died of cancer on February 9, 1999, at his home in Minneapolis.

== See also ==
- List of gridiron football players who became professional wrestlers
- List of select Jewish football players
- List of Jewish professional wrestlers
