= NWA Canadian Open Tag Team Championship =

Professional wrestling tag team championship

Details
- Promotion: Maple Leaf Wrestling
- Date established: August 28, 1952
- Date retired: January 26, 1961
Statistics
- First champion(s): Pat Flanagan and Whipper Billy Watson
- Final champion(s): Ilio DiPaolo and Billy Red Lyons
- Most reigns: Team: Al and Tiny Mills (5 reigns); Individual: Whipper Billy Watson (15 reigns)

The NWA Canadian Open Tag Team Championship was the top tag team professional wrestling championship in the Canadian promotion Maple Leaf Wrestling from 1952 through 1961. The title was then replaced with the Toronto version of the NWA International Tag Team Championship.

== Title history ==
Key
No.	Overall reign number
Reign	Reign number for the specific team—reign numbers for the individuals are in parentheses, if different
Days	Number of days held

No.	Champion	Championship change			Reign statistics		Notes	Ref.
No.	Champion	Date	Event	Location	Reign	Days	Notes	Ref.
1	Pat Flanagan and Whipper Billy Watson	August 28, 1952	Stampede show	Toronto, Ontario	1	105	Defeated Hans Hermann and Lord Athol Layton in a tournament final to become the first champions.	
2	Lou Plummer and Dick Raines	December 11, 1952	Stampede show	Toronto, Ontario	1	N/A		
3	Al and Tiny Mills	January 1953	Stampede show	Toronto, Ontario	1	N/A		
4	Yvon Robert and Whipper Billy Watson (2)	January 12, 1953	Stampede show	Toronto, Ontario	1	319		
5	Al and Tiny Mills	November 27, 1953	Stampede show	Toronto, Ontario	2	41		
6	Hombre Montana and Whipper Billy Watson (3)	January 7, 1954	Stampede show	Toronto, Ontario	1	35		
7	Al and Tiny Mills	February 11, 1954	Stampede show	Toronto, Ontario	3	21		
8	Emil and Ernie Dusek	March 4, 1954	Stampede show	Toronto, Ontario	1	N/A		
9	Al and Tiny Mills	1954	Stampede show	Toronto, Ontario	4	N/A		
10	Tex McKenzie and Whipper Billy Watson (4)	June 16, 1954	Stampede show	Toronto, Ontario	1	22		
11	Great Togo and Tosh Togo	July 8, 1954	Stampede show	Toronto, Ontario	1	82		
12	Jack Claybourne and Luther Lindsay	September 28, 1954	Stampede show	Hamilton, Ontario	1	72	Defeated Pat Fraley and Tosh Togo.	
13	The Kalmikoffs (Ivan and Karol Kalmikoff)	December 9, 1954	Stampede show	Toronto, Ontario	1	N/A		
14	Paul Baillargeon and Whipper Billy Watson (5)	December 1954	Stampede show	N/A	1	N/A		
15	Al and Tiny Mills	January 20, 1955	Stampede show	Toronto, Ontario	5	56		
16	The Kalmikoffs (Ivan and Karol Kalmikoff)	March 17, 1955	Stampede show	Toronto, Ontario	2	119		
17	Lord Athol Layton and Whipper Billy Watson (6)	July 14, 1955	Stampede show	N/A	1	103		
18	Fritz Von Erich and Karl Von Schober	October 25, 1955	Stampede show	Toronto, Ontario	1	44		
19	Ilio DiPaolo and Whipper Billy Watson (7)	December 8, 1955	Stampede show	Toronto, Ontario	1	21		
20	Fritz Von Erich and Karl Von Schober	December 29, 1955	Stampede show	Toronto, Ontario	2	231		
21	Guy and Joe Brunetti	August 16, 1956	Stampede show	Toronto, Ontario	1	35		
22	Hard Boiled Haggerty and Dick Hutton	September 20, 1956	Stampede show	Toronto, Ontario	1	7		
23	Guy and Joe Brunetti	September 27, 1956	Stampede show	Toronto, Ontario	2	28		
24	Mr. Hito and Mr. Moto	October 25, 1956	Stampede show	Toronto, Ontario	1	N/A		
—		N/A	—	—				
25	Guy and Joe Brunetti	February 5, 1957	Stampede show	Hamilton, Ontario	3	7		
26	Bill and Ed Miller	February 12, 1957	Stampede show	Hamilton, Ontario	1	86		
27	Pat O'Connor and Whipper Billy Watson (8)	May 9, 1957	Stampede show	Toronto, Ontario	1	175		
28	Gene Kiniski and Fritz Von Erich (3)	October 31, 1957	Stampede show	Toronto, Ontario	1	105		
29	Yukon Eric and Whipper Billy Watson (9)	February 13, 1958	Stampede show	Toronto, Ontario	1	35		
30	Reggie and Stan Lisowski	March 20, 1958	Stampede show	N/A	1	63		
31	Bobo Brazil and Whipper Billy Watson (10)	May 22, 1958	Stampede show	Toronto, Ontario	1	21		
32	The Kalmikoffs (Ivan and Nikita Kalmikoff)	June 12, 1958	Stampede show	Toronto, Ontario	1	28		
33	Dara Singh and Yukon Eric (2)	July 10, 1958	Stampede show	N/A	1	28		
34	Reggie and Stan Lisowski	August 7, 1958	Stampede show	Toronto, Ontario	2	21		
35	Bernard Vignal and Whipper Billy Watson (11)	August 28, 1958	Stampede show	Toronto, Ontario	1	27		
36	The Kalmikoffs (Ivan and Nikita Kalmikoff)	September 24, 1958	Stampede show	London, Ontario	2	50		
37	Yukon Eric (3) and Whipper Billy Watson (12)	November 13, 1958	Stampede show	N/A	2	350		
38	Don Leo Jonathan and Gene Kiniski (2)	October 29, 1959	Stampede show	Toronto, Ontario	1	63		
39	Ilio DiPaolo (2) and Whipper Billy Watson (13)	December 31, 1959	Stampede show	Toronto, Ontario	2	74		
40	The Kalmikoffs (Ivan and Nikita Kalmikoff)	March 14, 1960	Stampede show	Toronto, Ontario	3	38		
41	Ilio DiPaolo (3) and Whipper Billy Watson (14)	April 21, 1960	Stampede show	Toronto, Ontario	3	N/A		
42	Doc and Mike Gallagher	1960	Stampede show	Toronto, Ontario	1	N/A		
43	Ilio DiPaolo (4) and Whipper Billy Watson (15)	August 18, 1960	Stampede show	Toronto, Ontario	4	133		
44	Murder Incorporated (Stan Kowalski and Tiny Mills)	December 29, 1960	Stampede show	Toronto, Ontario	1	28		
45	Ilio DiPaolo (5) and Billy Red Lyons	January 26, 1961	Stampede show	Toronto, Ontario	1	N/A		
—	Deactivated	June 1961	—	—	—	—	Title abandoned and replaced with the NWA International Tag Team Championship (Toronto version)	

== See also ==
- Maple Leaf Wrestling
