= Bert Smith (ice hockey) =

British ice hockey player

Personal information
- Born: 6 September 1925; Kirkcaldy, Scotland
- Died: 30 March 2001 (aged 75); St. Andrews, Scotland

Sport
- Sport: Ice hockey

Robert Samuel Smith (6 September 1925 – 30 March 2001) was a British ice hockey player. He competed in the men's tournament at the 1948 Winter Olympics.
