= NWA Canadian Tag Team Championship (Calgary version) =

Professional wrestling tag team championship

Details
- Promotion: Stampede Wrestling
- Date established: 1954
- Date retired: 1959
Statistics
- First champion(s): The Flying Scotts (George and Sandy Scott)
- Final champion(s): Mad Dog and Butcher Vachon
- Most reigns: The Flying Scotts

The Calgary version of the NWA Canadian Tag Team Championship was established in 1954 as the original top tag team championship in Stampede Wrestling; it held that status until 1959, when the title was abandoned in favor of Stampede's then-newly created International Tag Team Championship.

== Title history ==
Key
No.	Overall reign number
Reign	Reign number for the specific team—reign numbers for the individuals are in parentheses, if different
Days	Number of days held

No.	Champion	Championship change			Reign statistics		Notes	Ref.
No.	Champion	Date	Event	Location	Reign	Days	Notes	Ref.
1	The Flying Scotts (George and Sandy Scott)	1954	Stampede show	N/A	1	(Note: The exact date the championship was created is uncertain, which means that the first title reign lasted between 1 and 196 days.)		
2	Chico Garcia and Roberto Pico	July 16, 1954	Stampede show	N/A	1	7		
3	The Flying Scotts (George and Sandy Scott)	July 23, 1954	Stampede show	N/A	2	39		
4	Al and Tiny Mills	August 31, 1954	Stampede show	Edmonton, Alberta	1	63		
5	Tex McKenzie and Ilio DiPaolo	November 2, 1954	Stampede show	Edmonton, Alberta	1	14		
6	Al and Tiny Mills	November 16, 1954	Stampede show	Edmonton, Alberta	2	(Note: The exact date the championship was vacated is uncertain, which means that the championship reign lasted at least 9 days.)		
—	Vacated	November 25, 1954 (NET)	N/A	N/A	—	—	Championship vacated for undocumented reasons	
—		N/A		—				
7	Jim Wright and Roberto Pico (2)	February 8, 1956	Stampede show	Saskatoon, Saskatchewan	1	21	Defeated Ray Villmer and Herb Freeman in tournament final.	
8	Luther Lindsay and Ray Villmer	February 29, 1956	Stampede show	Saskatoon, Saskatchewan	1	(Note: The exact date that Lindsay and Villmer lost the championship is uncertain, which means that the title reign lasted between 1 day and 111 days)	Still champions as of May 9, 1956.	
9	Fritz Von Erich and Lou Sjoberg	June 16, 1956 (NLT)	Stampede show	N/A	1	(Note: The exact date Von Erich and Sjoberg won the championship is uncertain, which means that the title reign lasted between 23 and 130 days.)	Defended against Alberta Tag Team Champions George and Sandy Scott on this day.	
10	Gene Kiniski and Dick Hutton	July 9, 1956	Stampede show	N/A	1	(Note: The length of their title reign is too uncertain to calculate.)		
—		N/A		—				
11	The Kalmikoffs (Ivan and Karol Kalmikoff)	March 24, 1958	Stampede show	Edmonton, Alberta	1	(Note: The exact date the Kalmikoffs lost the championship is uncertain, which means that their reign lasted between 1 day and 281 days.)	Defeated Guy and Joe Brunetti to win the vacant titles.	
12	The Flying Scotts (George and Sandy Scott)	1958	Stampede show	N/A	3	(Note: The exact date the Flying Scotts won the championship is uncertain, which means that their reign lasted between 1 day and 281 days.)		
13	Chico Garcia (2) and Chet Wallick	January 13, 1959	Stampede show	Edmonton, Alberta	1	35		
14	Mad Dog and Butcher Vachon	February 17, 1959	Stampede show	Edmonton, Alberta	1	9		
15	The Flying Scotts (George and Sandy Scott)	February 26, 1959	Stampede show	N/A	4	(Note: The exact date the Flying Scotts lost the championship is uncertain, which means that their title reign lasted between 3 and 11 days.)		
16	Mad Dog and Butcher Vachon	March 1959	Stampede show	N/A	2	(Note: The exact date that the Vachons won the championship is uncertain, which means that their title reign lasted between 1 and 9 days.)		
17	Shag Thomas and Mighty Ursus	March 10, 1959	Stampede show	Edmonton, Alberta	1	(Note: The exact date that Thomas and Ursus lost the championship is uncertain, which means that the title reign lasted between 52 and 62 days.)		
18	Charro Azteca and Chet Wallick (2)	May 1959	Stampede show	N/A	1	(Note: The exact date Charro Azteca and Wallick won the championship is uncertain, which means that their title reign lasted between 1 day and 11 days.)		
19	Mad Dog and Butcher Vachon	May 12, 1959	Stampede show	Edmonton, Alberta	3	(Note: The exact date the championship was abandoned is unknown, which means that the title reign lasted between 1 day and 233 days.)		
—	Vacated	1959	N/A	N/A	—	—	Title abandoned and replaced with the Stampede International Tag Team Championship.	
