= Hubert Smith (cricketer) =

Australian cricketer

Personal information
- Born: 9 October 1891; Beaudesert, Queensland, Australia
- Died: 7 June 1917 (aged 25); Belgium
- Source: Cricinfo, 6 October 2020

Hubert George Selwyn-Smith (9 October 1891 – 7 June 1917) was an Australian cricketer. He played in three first-class matches for Queensland between 1911 and 1913. He was killed in action during World War I.

== See also ==
- List of Queensland first-class cricketers
