= Herbert Smith (forward) =

English footballer

Personal information
- Place of birth: Bradford, England
- Position: Forward

Senior career*
Years	Team	Apps	(Gls)
- Liversedge
1925–1926	Bradford City	5	(0)
Total		5	(0)
- * Club domestic league appearances and goals

Herbert Smith was an English professional footballer who played as a forward.

== Career ==
Born in Bradford, Smith moved from Liversedge to Bradford City in May 1925. He made 5 league appearances for the club, before being released in 1926.

== Sources ==
- Frost, Terry (1988). Bradford City A Complete Record 1903-1988. Breedon Books Sport. ISBN 0-907969-38-0.
