= The Crusher (wrestler) =

American professional wrestler (1926–2005)

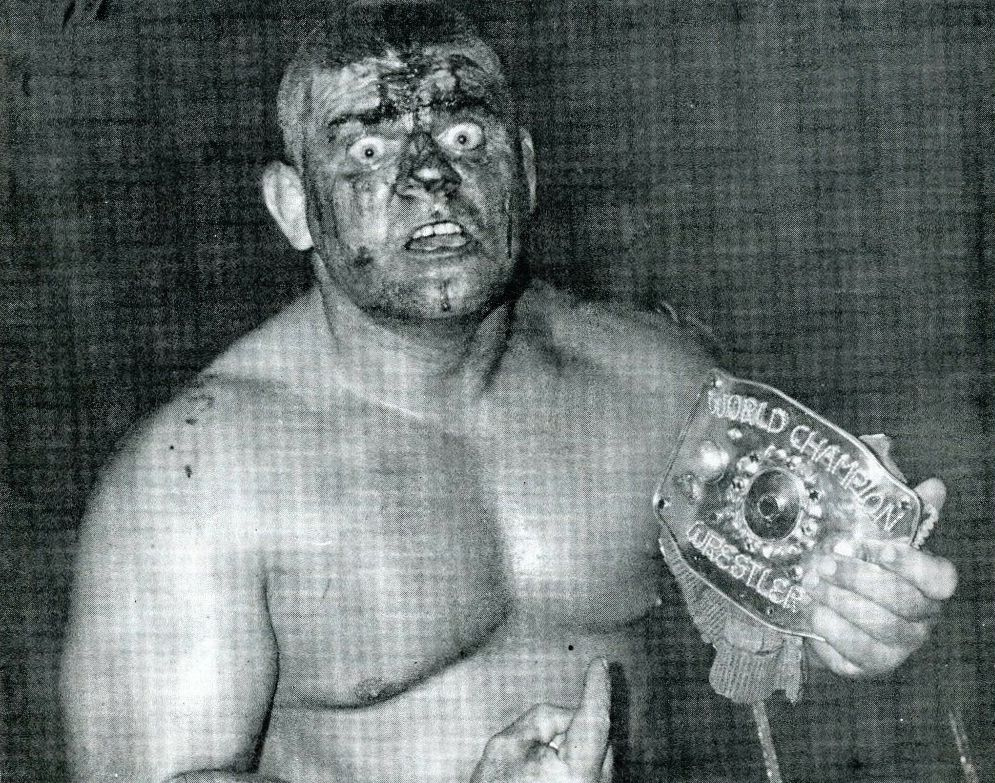
- The Crusher in 1971

Personal information
- Born: Reginald Lisowski; July 11, 1926 South Milwaukee, Wisconsin, U.S.
- Died: October 22, 2005 (aged 79) South Milwaukee, Wisconsin, U.S.
- Spouse: Faye (m. 1949; died 2003)
- Children: 4

Professional wrestling career
- Ring name(s): The Crusher; Crusher Lisowski; Da Crusher; Dick Crusher; Reggie Lisowski; Monster No.2
- Billed height: 5 ft 11 in (1.80 m)
- Billed weight: 260 lb (118 kg)
- Trained by: Ivan Racy; Buck Tassie
- Debut: November 30, 1949
- Retired: 1989
- Military service
- Allegiance: United States
- Branch: United States Army

Reginald Lisowski (July 11, 1926 – October 22, 2005) was an American professional wrestler, better known by his ring name, The Crusher (sometimes Crusher Lisowski to distinguish him from other Crushers, such as Crusher Blackwell). In his obituary, The Washington Post described him as "a professional wrestler whose blue-collar bona fides made him beloved among working class fans for 40 years". One of the biggest-drawing performers in the history of the American Wrestling Association (AWA), he was known as "The Man Who Made Milwaukee Famous", and found his greatest success in the American Midwest, often teaming with Dick the Bruiser.

== Early life ==
Lisowski was born on July 11, 1926, and was raised by a Polish family in the Milwaukee suburb of South Milwaukee. Early on, he was more interested in football, playing fullback for the South Milwaukee High School football team, but took up wrestling while stationed in Germany with the United States Army. He reportedly began his training for professional wrestling at the age of 13.

== Professional wrestling career ==
=== Early career (1949–1954) ===
Having developed a liking for professional wrestling, Lisowski continued training with Ivan Racy and Buck Tassie at Milwaukee's Eagles Club when he returned, eventually wrestling Marcel Buchet in his first recorded match late in 1949 as a dark-haired babyface who wore a star-spangled jacket. His early career included wrestling three to four nights per week at a Chicago armory, typically earning $5 a night. To support himself and to stay in shape, Lisowski worked various blue collar jobs by day, from meat packing to bricklaying. Fred Kohler was the first promoter to put him on TV, and by 1954 he had developed a barrel-chested physique that would stick with him for the entirety of his career. Decades before Stone Cold Steve Austin and The Sandman, Lisowski perfected the gimmick of the beer drinking tough guy. To elevate his career further, he bleached his dark hair blonde and started to get over as a strongman heel, famous for his bolo punch finisher as well as a devastating full nelson. This eventually led to him winning the Chicago-area NWA World Tag Team Championship with partner Art Nielson.

=== Tag team wrestling (1954–1986) ===
Lisowski continued to have tag team success throughout the remainder of the 1950s, often paired with his wrestling "brother" Stan Lisowski. By 1959, he was being billed as "Crusher" Lisowski, which legend came from a promoter's off-hand comment that he "just crushes everybody." Until early 1965, Crusher was a heel in the AWA. After meeting the team of Larry Hennig & Harley Race for the first time, the fans adopted Crusher and his wrestling "cousin" Dick the Bruiser as full-fledged heroes in AWA territory. They were sometimes known as "The Cussin' Cousins" and "saloon goons" (a nickname provided by Nick Bockwinkel). His bluster was legendary, as he would threaten to maul opponents in the ring and afterward "have a party, take all the dollies down Wisconsin Avenue, drink beer and dance the polka." Besides his impressive physique, The Crusher's gimmick was to absorb a tremendous amount of punishment and still be able to make a comeback for the win. Over the next 15 to 20 years, Crusher and Bruiser were tag partners off and on, and a natural combination due to their common background and brawling wrestling style. Both of them were steel cage specialists, rarely losing matches of that type. If Dick the Bruiser and Crusher felt they hadn't bloodied their opponents enough during a match, they would trade punches with each other afterwards. They won the AWA World Tag Team Championship 5 times, the WWA Tag Team Titles (which were from Bruiser's promotion) 6 times, and the NWA International Tag Titles 1 time among others.

=== Success as a solo wrestler (1960–1986) ===
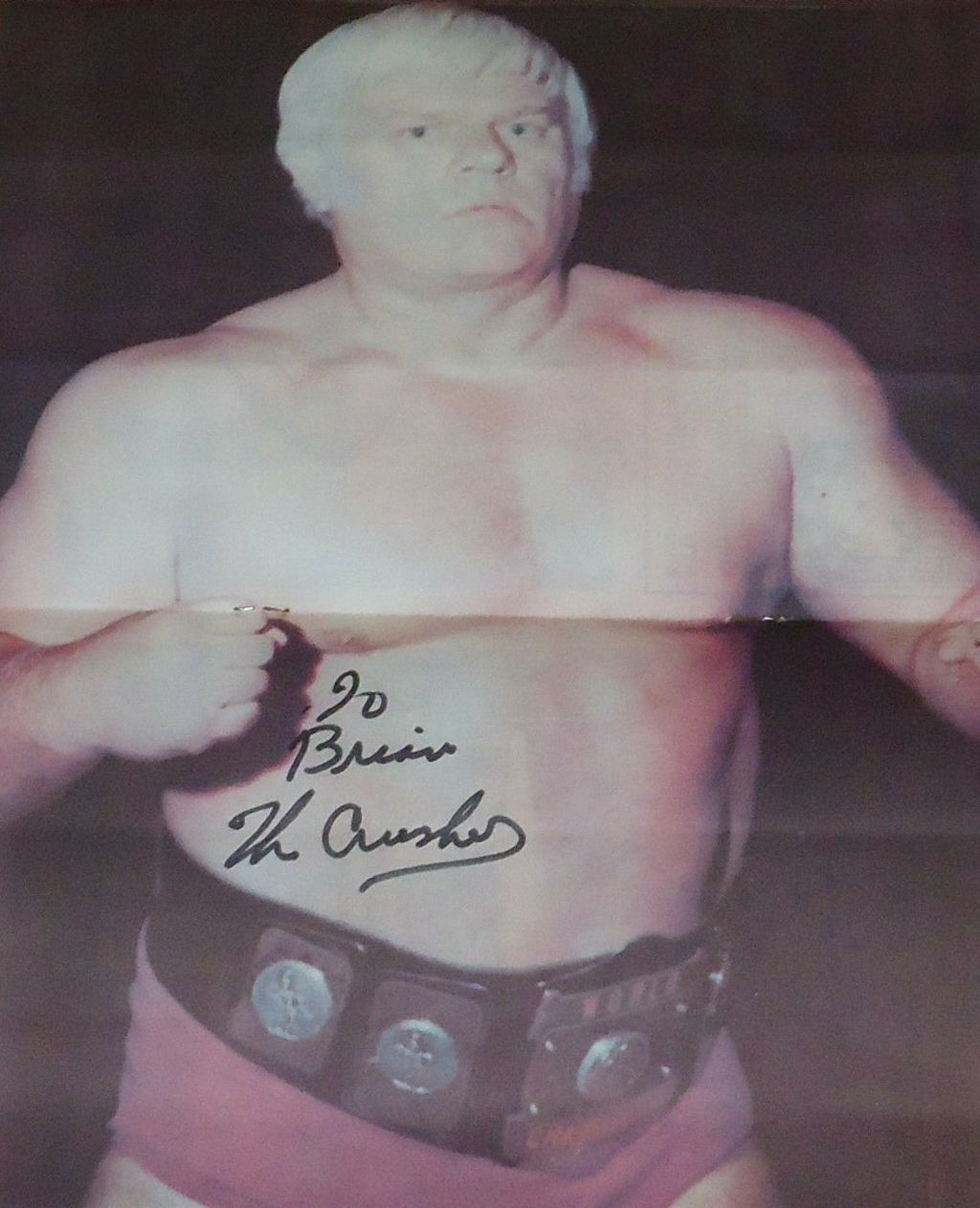
The Crusher in 1977

Introduced at the beginning of wrestling matches as "The Wrestler That Made Milwaukee Famous" (a play on the slogan for Schlitz, "The Beer That Made Milwaukee Famous"), Crusher was successful as a solo wrestler, winning the AWA World Heavyweight Championship three times, the first time unifying it with the Omaha version of the World Heavyweight Championship on July 9, 1963, in a match where he defeated Verne Gagne. He was skillful at cutting promos, as he would brag about his "100 megaton biceps" and offer to pummel "da bum" he was facing in the ring with ease, and he often delighted in calling opponents "turkeynecks". His most quotable and famous phrase though was: "How 'bout 'dat?" When asked how he trained for a match, he'd claim he ran along the waterfront in Milwaukee carrying a large full beer barrel over either shoulder for strength (and longtime AWA announcer Rodger Kent often noted that by the end of the Crusher's training run, the beer was gone), and that he'd dance polka all night with Polish barmaids to increase his stamina. Although much of Crusher's popularity came from the idea that he was a big beer drinker, in actuality, he never drank beer, and according to Baron Von Raschke, he actually preferred wine. In 1981, Lisowski's wrestling career almost came to an end when the 450-pound Jerry Blackwell (who he had feuded with over the "Crusher" moniker) botched a top rope move and landed on Lisowski's right arm, causing nerve damage from his shoulder all the way to his wrist. Doctors told him he would never wrestle again, but Crusher did strength training for two years while he was unofficially "retired", returning to the ring in 1983, teaming with Baron von Raschke to beat Jerry Blackwell and Ken Patera for the AWA World Tag Team titles, only to lose them to The Road Warriors in August 1984.

=== Move to the World Wrestling Federation (1966, 1986-1988) ===
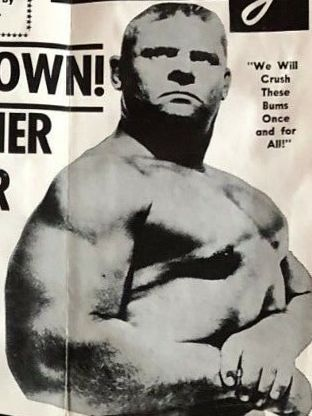
The Crusher in November 1968

Lisowski also had a successful run in the WWWF (later WWF) in 1966, where he was the nemesis of Johnny Valentine and a young Bruno Sammartino, primarily in the Pittsburgh promotion.

In the mid-1980s, seeing that the American Wrestling Association (AWA) promotion with which he had the most success over the years was crumbling, particularly when Hulk Hogan and many of the other top talent jumped ship to Vince McMahon's World Wrestling Federation (WWF), Crusher went to work for McMahon on a part-time basis, appearing at WWF house shows all over the Midwest. Lisowski claimed that he made more money working part-time for McMahon than he did working for the frugal Gagne on a full-time basis. In 1986, Lisowski occasionally teamed with The Machines as Crusher Machine.

The Crusher's last recorded match was at a WWF house show in Omaha on February 15, 1988, replacing Billy Jack Haynes to team with Ken Patera and face Demolition, who were disqualified when Mr. Fuji tripped Crusher with a cane about three minutes in. The Crusher's last television appearance was at WWF's 1998 pay-per-view Over the Edge: In Your House where was shown sitting alongside Mad Dog Vachon in the front row. Jerry Lawler made fun of the two men's age, and tried to steal Vachon's artificial leg, but Vachon hit him over the head with it, and Crusher punched him. As Lawler bailed, the two former enemies shook hands.

== Other media ==
In 1974, he and Dick the Bruiser starred in the movie The Wrestler, where they beat up a posse of mobsters on the big screen. Lisowski also pitched products in commercials for liquor stores and televisions. He starred in a Byron's Tires commercial where he folded a casing in half and yelled "Don't be a turkey neck! Get your tires from Byron's!".

== Personal life and death ==
Lisowski once worked as a guest conductor for the Milwaukee Symphony Orchestra at a fundraising event.

In his later years, multiple surgeries on his hips and his knee crippled Lisowski, as well as heart bypass surgery and a non-cancerous tumor removed from his brain stem in March 2005, which left him partially paralyzed. Lisowski's wife Faye died in March 2003 after the couple were married for 55 years. He spent the final months of his life in a nursing home and had to be fed through a tube, but his son David stated that he would never stop working out until his death.

On October 22, 2005, he died of a brain tumor at the age of 79. He, his wife, Faye, and infant son Gary are interred at the Holy Sepulcher Cemetery near Milwaukee. At his burial, a wrestling ring with crimson ropes was set up, and on the mat were a pair of black wrestling boots. Gagne reacted to his death by saying to the St. Paul Pioneer Press, "We had some dandy matches. The Crusher never was a great technically skilled wrestler, but he was tougher than nails and a brawler. He could bench press nearly 600 pounds. And he loved to have fun. After a match, he couldn't get a beer in his hands fast enough."

== Legacy ==
In 1964, the Minneapolis-based garage rock band The Novas wrote a song dedicated to him called "The Crusher", with lead singer Bob Nolan imitating the raunchy voice of Crusher Lisowski (and his trademark yell at the beginning of the record). The tune, which included the lyrics "Do the hammer lock, you turkeynecks!" was popular in the upper Midwest and made it to #88 on the national Billboard chart and #40 in Canada It was later covered by The Cramps on their album Psychedelic Jungle, and has long been a staple on the Dr. Demento Radio Show. The song has received a resurgence of popularity in recent years, as David Letterman had often played it on his late-night talk show. The Ramones released a song entitled "The Crusher", paying tribute to Lisowski on their last studio recorded album, Adios Amigos.

He was ranked 55 out of 100 wrestlers for Dave Meltzer's Top 100 Wrestlers of all time in 2002.

On June 8, 2019, a bronze statue of The Crusher was unveiled in South Milwaukee at 1101 Milwaukee Avenue. South Milwaukee Mayor Erik Brooks declared the day "Reggie 'Da Crusher' Lisowski Day" in his memory. A few weeks later on August 24, 2019, surveillance video captured two men striking the statue with a concrete block, damaging the nose, cheek and chest. Da Crusher's family noticed the damage and reported it to police. It was later revealed those who vandalized the statue were 18-year-old James Dudgeon, who was charged with criminal damage to property, and 21-year-old Douglas E. Macklin, who was also charged with criminal damage to property. A yearly celebration called "Crusherfest" is held typically in June to celebrate the Da Crusher.

== Championships and accomplishments ==
- Big Time Wrestling ( Omaha)
  - World Tag Team Championship ( Nebraska version ) ( 1 time ) - with Stan Lisowski
- Capitol Wrestling Corporation
  - NWA United States Television Championship (1 time)
- Cauliflower Alley Club
  - Other honoree (2000)
- Fred Kohler Enterprises
  - NWA World Tag Team Championship (Chicago version) (3 times) - with Art Neilson (1) and Stan Lisowski (2)
- Georgia Championship Wrestling
  - NWA Georgia Tag Team Championship (1 time) - with Tommy Rich
- Japan Wrestling Association
  - NWA International Tag Team Championship (1 time) - with Dick the Bruiser
- Maple Leaf Wrestling
  - NWA Canadian Open Tag Team Championship (1 time) - with Stan Lisowski
- NWA Minneapolis Wrestling and Boxing Club/American Wrestling Association
  - AWA Brass Knuckles Championship (1 time)
  - AWA World Heavyweight Championship (3 times)
  - AWA World Tag Team Championship (9 times) - with Dick the Bruiser (5), Verne Gagne (1), Red Bastien (1), Billy Robinson (1) and Baron von Raschke (1)
  - NWA World Tag Team Championship (Minneapolis version) (2 times) - with Stan Lisowski
  - British Open Tag Team Championship (Minneapolis version) (1 time) - with Stan Lisowski
  - World Heavyweight Championship (Omaha version) (1 time)
  - Nebraska Heavyweight Championship (1 time)
- Pro Wrestling Illustrated
  - PWI Tag Team of the Year (1972) - with Dick the Bruiser
  - Ranked No. 260 of the 500 best singles wrestlers of the PWI Years in 2003
- Professional Wrestling Hall of Fame
  - (Class of 2005) - with Bruiser
- Western States Sports
  - NWA World Tag Team Championship (Amarillo version) (1 time) - with Art Nelson
- World Championship Wrestling
  - WCW Hall of Fame (Class of 1994)
- World Wrestling Association
  - WWA World Tag Team Championship (6 times) - with Dick the Bruiser
- Wrestling Observer Newsletter
  - Worst Tag Team (1984) with Baron Von Raschke
  - Wrestling Observer Newsletter Hall of Fame (Class of 1996)
- Other
  - Rocky Mountain Heavyweight Championship (1 time)
