= Kalmikoffs =

Professional wrestling stable

The Kalmikoffs
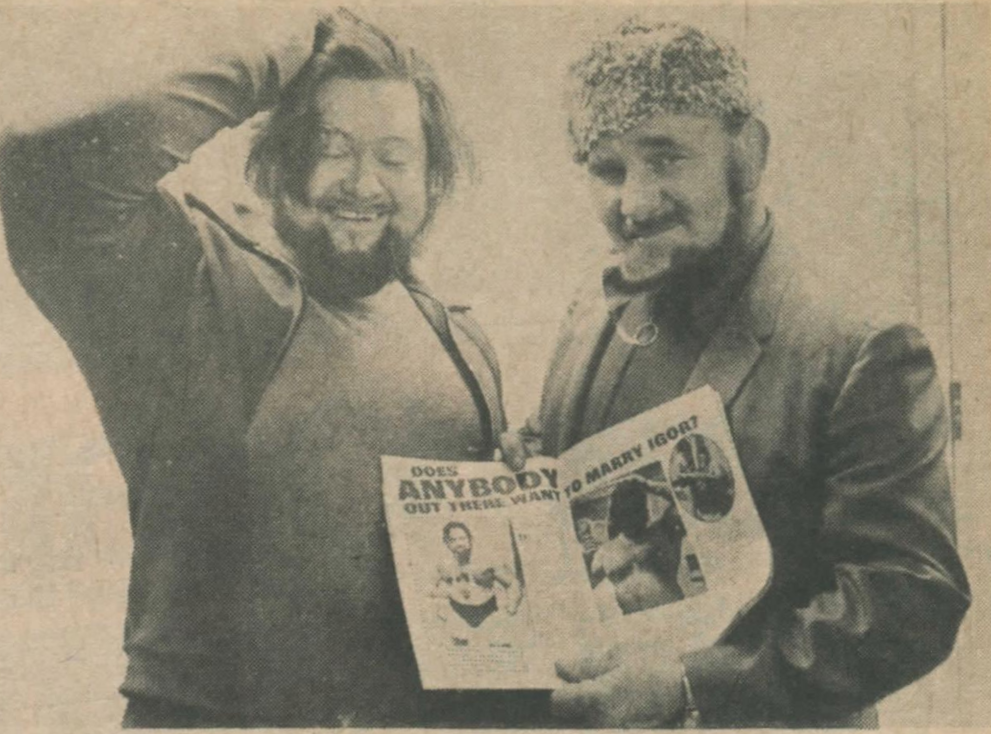
- Ivan Kalmikoff (right) and Mighty Igor in 1972

Stable
- Members: Ivan Kalmikoff; Karol Kalmikoff; Nikita Kalmikoff; Stan/Igor Kalmikoff
- Name(s): The Kalmikoffs; Ivan Kalmikoff and Karol Krauser; Ivan and Karol Kalmikoff; Ivan and Nikita Kalmikoff; Karol and Stan/Igor Kalmikoff
- Billed from: Soviet Union
- Debut: October 28, 1953
- Disbanded: 1965

The Kalmikoffs were a professional wrestling group of fictitious Soviet brothers. It began as a tag team consisting of Ivan (Edward Bogucki) and Karol (Karol Piwoworczyk) who were later joined by "brothers" Nikita (Nikita Mulkovitch) and Stan (or Igor) (Eric Pomeroy). They were very successful in the mid-1950s to early 1960s, especially the original tag team of Ivan and Karol.

== History ==
The original two members debuted on October 28, 1953 in Amarillo, Texas as Ivan Kalmikoff and Karol Krauser against George and Jack Curtis. Already known as the Kalmikoffs, they later became fictional brothers; they also became a successful tag team in the Minneapolis territory (future American Wrestling Association) and in Canada winning several titles.

In 1962, after the formation of the AWA, Karol shortly left the promotion and Ivan begun teaming with another brother, Nikita with some success. After Karol returned to the AWA, the original duo won the AWA World Tag Team Championships.

By 1963, Ivan settled into a part-time job in the Detroit zoo as a landscaper. Karol Kalmikoff begun teaming with yet another "brother", Stan Kalmikoff, sometimes called Igor. The tandem didn't last, however, as Karol suffered a fatal heart attack on September 12, 1964 in Salt Lake City. Ivan would spend some time managing Mighty Igor Vodic while the other "brothers" moved on to other gimmicks.

In 1939 or 1940, Karol Krauser modeled for the Fleischer Studios in Florida for the Superman animated shorts.

Karols wife Zosia was also one of the first female wrestlers in the late thirties and early forties. She was managed by Jack Pfeifer and billed out as "Zoska Burska"

== Championships and accomplishments ==
=== Ivan & Karol ===
- American Wrestling Alliance
  - AWA World Tag Team Championship (Indiana version) (1 time)
- Maple Leaf Wrestling
  - NWA Canadian Open Tag Team Championship (3 times)
- NWA All-Star Wrestling
  - NWA Pacific Coast Tag Team Championship (Vancouver version) (1 time)
- NWA Minneapolis Wrestling and Boxing Club / American Wrestling Association
  - AWA World Tag Team Championship (1 time)
  - NWA World Tag Team Championship (Minneapolis version) (4 times)
- Southwest Sports, Inc.
  - NWA Texas Tag Team Championship (1 time)
- Stampede Wrestling
  - NWA Canadian Tag Team Championship (Calgary version) (1 time)
  - NWA International Tag Team Championship (Calgary version) (1 time)
- Western States Sports
  - NWA Southwest Tag Team Championship (1 time)

=== Ivan & Nikita ===
- Maple Leaf Wrestling

- NWA Canadian Open Tag Team Championship (2 times)

=== Ivan Kalmikoff ===
Born Edward Bogucki (May 21, 1918 - June 9, 1996) in Dubois, Pennsylvania, Ivan found early success outside the Kalmikoffs in Dory Funk's NWA Western States Sports in Amarillo, Texas.

- Southwest Sports, Inc.
  - NWA Texas Tag Team Championship (1 time) - with Duke Keomuka
- Western States Sports
  - NWA Southwest Tag Team Championship (1 time) - with Ace Abbott
  - NWA Southwest Junior Heavyweight Championship (1 time)

=== Karol Krauser/Kalmikoff ===
Karol Piwoworczyk (August 12, 1912 – September 12, 1964) in Holyoke, Massachusetts, Karol won one singles championship before dying in 1964.

- Midwest Wrestling Association
  - MWA Heavyweight Championship (1 time)
