= Herbie Smith (footballer) =

Australian rules footballer

Personal information
- Full name: Herbie Smith
- Born: 27 August 1895
- Died: 15 March 1959 (aged 63)
- Original team: Prahran
- Height: 175 cm (5 ft 9 in)
- Weight: 73 kg (161 lb)

Playing career^{1}
Years	Club	Games (Goals)
1919–21	Geelong	38 (0)
- ^{1} Playing statistics correct to the end of 1921.

Herbie Smith (27 August 1895 – 15 March 1959) was an Australian rules footballer who played with Geelong in the Victorian Football League (VFL).
