= Ilio DiPaolo =

Italian professional wrestler and restaurateur (1926–1995)

Personal information
- Born: 7 November 1926 Introdacqua (AQ), Abruzzo, Italy
- Died: 10 May 1995 (aged 68) Hamburg, New York, U.S.

Professional wrestling career
- Ring name: Ilio DiPaolo
- Billed height: 6 ft 2 in (188 cm)
- Billed weight: 265 lb (120 kg)
- Trained by: Toots Mondt
- Debut: 1949
- Retired: 1965

Ilio DiPaolo (7 November 1926 – 10 May 1995) was an Italian professional wrestler and restaurateur who lived in the Buffalo, New York area.

== Professional wrestling career ==
DiPaolo was born in Italy and lived there until he moved to Venezuela in 1949. There, he met promoter Toots Mondt, who taught him to wrestle. While waiting to get the proper paperwork to move to the United States, he relocated to the Dominican Republic to wrestle in the meantime. After the paperwork was completed, he moved to Buffalo, New York in 1951. He then began to work for Frank Tunney out of the Toronto area. Around this time he teamed with Whipper Billy Watson to win the NWA Canadian Open Tag Team Championship. Also in Toronto, he wrestled Pat O'Connor for the NWA World title in 1959, but the match went to a one-hour time limit draw. His last match was against Lou Thesz for the same title; a match that also went to a one-hour time limit draw.

== Personal life ==
DiPaolo met his wife, Ethel, the stepdaughter of promoter Pedro Martinez, in 1952. The couple had four children.

He opened his first restaurant, a pizzeria, when he was in his 40s, but it was destroyed by a fire. DiPaolo retired from wrestling full-time in 1965 and opened his second restaurant, an eponymous Italian restaurant now known as "Ilio DiPaolo's" in Blasdell, New York. He died in 1995 after being struck by a car, during a torrential downpour, while crossing the street in front of Tina's Italian Kitchen restaurant with his wife. After his death, DiPaolo's oldest son, Dennis, began to run the restaurant. His other children also worked in the restaurant.

World Championship Wrestling held the Ilio DiPaolo Memorial Show for DiPaolo from 1996 through 1999. To this point, over $1 million has been raised for the Ilio DiPaolo Scholarship Fund and for other Buffalo charities like the Children's Hospital and People Inc.

DiPaolo was selected as a New York State Award recipient by the Professional Wrestling Hall of Fame and Museum in 2003. The DiPaolo family has also been inducted into the New York Chapter of the National Wrestling Hall of Fame for the creation of the Ilio DiPaolo Scholarship fund and continual contribution to high school wrestling.

== Championships and accomplishments ==
- Big Time Wrestling
  - BTW World Tag Team Championship (1 time) - with Buddy Lee
- Cauliflower Alley Club
  - Other honoree (1994)
- Greater Buffalo Sports Hall of Fame
  - 1996 inductee
- Maple Leaf Wrestling
  - NWA Canadian Open Tag Team Championship (5 times) - with Whipper Billy Watson (4) and Billy Red Lyons (1)
- Midwest Wrestling Association
  - MWA Ohio Heavyweight Championship (3 times)
  - MWA Ohio Tag Team Championship (1 time) - with Lord Athol Layton
- Professional Wrestling Hall of Fame and Museum
  - New York State Award (2003)
- Worldwide Wrestling Associates
  - WWA International Television Tag Team Championship (1 time) - with Tex McKenzie
- Stampede Wrestling
  - NWA Canadian Tag Team Championship (Calgary version) (1 time) - with Tex McKenzie
  - Stampede Wrestling Hall of Fame (Class of 1995)
