= Whipper Billy Watson =

Canadian professional wrestler (1915-1990)

Personal information
- Born: William John Potts; June 25, 1915 East York, Ontario, Canada
- Died: February 4, 1990 (aged 74) Orlando, Florida, U.S.

Professional wrestling career
- Ring name(s): Billy Potts; Billy Watson
- Billed height: 5 ft 10 in (178 cm)
- Billed weight: 227 lb (103 kg)
- Trained by: Phil Lawson
- Debut: 1936
- Retired: 28 November 1971

William John Potts, OOnt (June 25, 1915 – February 4, 1990) was a Canadian professional wrestler best known by his ring name "Whipper" Billy Watson. He was a two-time world champion, having held both the National Wrestling Association title and the National Wrestling Alliance title. On February 21, 1947, he became the first man to win a world heavyweight wrestling championship on TV.

== Early life ==
Watson was born in 1915 in East York, Ontario (now part of Toronto) to an English-born father, John Potts and a Canadian-born mother, Alice Mary Wilken. Watson began wrestling in Toronto under his real name. He was a member of the Scarborough Athletic Club in the mid-1930s and was wrestling on what were billed as amateur wrestling shows in Toronto.

== Professional wrestling career ==
=== Exposure to wrestling ===
For four years as a teenager, Watson sold the Toronto Daily Star at the corner of Danforth and Dawes Road. He was convinced by his brother George to play hooky from piano lessons one Saturday to attend a wrestling session at the All Hallows Anglican Church gymnasium. The event changed Watson's life. He furthered his wrestling training with Phillip Lawson at the Bowles Athletic Club and later the Central YMCA.

In 1936, wrestling as Bill Potts, Watson appeared on cards at British Consols Stadium in Toronto that were advertised as amateur wrestling shows. In June of that year, he went on a tour of the United Kingdom along with fellow Toronto wrestlers Tommy Nelson, Al Korman, and Ken "Tiger" Tasker and their manager, Harry Joyce. English wrestling often involved hard-nosed shooting and he was sidelined for six months with a fractured shoulder and numerous broken ribs. It was on this tour that William Potts became Billy Watson. Booked by former Olympic Gold Medalist George de Relwyskow, Watson traveled through England and Ireland. The change of surname was caused by the opportunity to take on the tour engagements of fellow Canadian wrestler, Winnett Wallingford Watson, whose ship had been delayed by bad weather in the Atlantic; the original Watson later changed his ring name to Pat Flanagan. Watson received the "Whipper" nickname from his usage of the "Irish Whip", which involved hurling an opponent into the ropes before throwing him over his back, though sources differ on whether the name was acquired in Canada or the United Kingdom.

=== Star attraction at Maple Leaf Gardens ===
After four years abroad, Watson and his wife returned to Canada, and he began wrestling at Maple Leaf Wrestling in Toronto under 27-year-old promoter Frank Tunney. Watson made his Maple Leaf Gardens debut in the opening match of the October 3, 1940. Newspaper reports in November said Watson was frustrated with not getting a main event match in his first six appearances at the Gardens. He appeared in one Gardens main event in February 1941, but his big push came two months later. According to storyline, Watson filed a lawsuit against Tunney for breach of contract, claiming that he had been signed to wrestle a main event against Masked Wolf. When Tunney held an open tournament to determine the number one contender for the world title on May 1, 1941, Watson entered; filing a copy of his entry form with the Ontario Athletics Commission so that Tunney would be unable to claim he did not enter, and then won four matches in one night to win the tournament.

From that point on, Watson was positioned as a legitimate main event performer, a position that was cemented during Watson's feud with Nanjo Singh, which began in January 1942. Watson soon became a crowd favourite and within a few years was a mainstream celebrity and one of Toronto's most popular citizens. Frank Tunney estimated that Whipper Watson drew more than five million people in main events of shows in Toronto. As one of the most popular wrestlers in the city's history, Watson spent 31 years entertaining fans. His last match was held on November 28, 1971 where he teamed with Bulldog Brower at the Gardens to beat Dingo the Sundowner and Man Mountain Cannon in less than five minutes which would be his very last match.

=== Championship runs ===
Watson defeated Nanjo Singh for the British Empire title on April 30, 1942. He feuded with Bill Longson, Lou Thesz, Yvon Robert, Gene Kiniski, Gorgeous George, and The Sheik, among many others. Watson earned a reputation as someone who was willing to lose clean in the ring. He earned an "everyman" image and Watson went on to hold the city of Toronto's regional title and the British Empire title on a regular basis.

Tunney cut Watson in on the business side of things. Their combined booking efforts resulted in large fortunes for the two of them. With connections to St. Louis promoter Tom Packs, Watson's notoriety resulted in Watson ending Longson's four-year title reign with a victory at the Kiel Auditorium in St. Louis on February 21, 1947. The territory of St. Louis became a home away from home for Watson. More than 10,000 St. Louis fans watched local hero Lou Thesz beat Watson for the world title on April 25, 1947. After Packs retired in 1948, Tunney bought into the territory in St. Louis and this resulted in many more matches for Watson in the city.

Watson became one of a small group of wrestlers to have membership in the National Wrestling Alliance. In 1955, Watson expanded his business ventures by purchasing the Seattle territory from Bob Murray. Wrestlers from Toronto such as Doug Hepburn and Sky-Hi Lee wrestled for Watson in Seattle. Ken Kenneth ran the day-to-day operations for Watson and imported wrestlers from San Francisco to compete in Seattle. The territory folded a few months later.

On March 15, 1956, Watson ended Thesz's six-year reign as World Champion in front of 15,000 fans. Former boxing champion Jack Dempsey was the referee in the match. Watson traveled throughout North America and took on legends such as Gorgeous George, Pat O'Connor, Dick Hutton, Richard Dempk, Bobo Brazil, Hans Schmidt, Fritz Von Erich, Killer Kowalski and Buddy Rogers. Thesz regained the title from Watson on November 9, 1956, in St. Louis.

Outside of wrestling, Watson considered playing football for the Edmonton Eskimos in the 1950s.

He also trained several wrestlers, including Farmer Brooks, a midget professional wrestler, and Rocky Johnson, a multiple-time tag team champion and father of The Rock.

== Personal life ==
On November 30, 1971, Watson was struck by an out-of-control car while placing a fireplace screen in the trunk of his car on Rogers Road in Toronto. After a three-hour surgery at Northwestern Hospital, his knee eventually recovered, but Watson was forced to retire from professional wrestling due to the severity of the injury. Although he nearly lost a leg, he continued his fundraising activities into his retirement.

Watson also promoted his own soft drink brand.

Watson was well known for his contributions to charity. He raised millions for campaigns such as the Easter Seals and was responsible for having 150,000 children join a safety club. He made many public appearances across Canada in support of children with physical disabilities and held an annual Easter Seals skate-a-thon at the Gardens. In 1974, he also started the "Whipper Watson Snowarama for Timmy" to raise money for the construction of a therapeutic pool. To date, Snowarama for Easter Seals Kids has raised over 16.1 million dollars provincially to help support children and youth with physical disabilities. Today, his campaign to build The Whipper Watson Therapeutic Pool at Southlake Regional Health Centre is illustrated in a mural in the facility.

As Watson was quoted in the Sault Star on January 31, 1979, "They deserve a chance to live life as normally as you or I and we can help them do it. We can tear down some of those needless barriers that the handicapped face everyday. We can give thanks that our kids and families are unafflicted and we can get out and sincerely work hard to make the 1979 Snowarama the most successful yet."

Over the course of the next twelve years, Watson gained 130 pounds to weigh 350 pounds. He died on February 4, 1990, in Orlando, Florida. He is well-remembered in York Region where he lived.

== Legacy ==
W.J. Watson Public School in Keswick, Ontario, is named in his honour.

He was inducted into the Ontario Sports Hall of Fame in 1995.

In 2003, Watson was ranked number one wrestler in Greg Oliver's book Professional Wrestling Hall Of Fame: The Canadians.

== Politics ==
Watson tested the waters of politics as the Progressive Conservative Party of Canada candidate in York East in the 1965 federal election. Watson placed second with 32% of the vote, falling about 2,500 votes behind Liberal Party of Canada candidate Steve Otto.

== Championships and accomplishments ==
- National Wrestling Association
  - NWA World Heavyweight Championship (1 time)
- International Wrestling Association (Montreal)
  - IWA International Heavyweight Championship (1 time)
- Maple Leaf Wrestling
  - NWA British Empire Heavyweight Championship (Toronto version) (9 times)
  - NWA Canadian Open Tag Team Championship (15 times) - with Pat Flanagan (1), Yvon Robert (1), Hombre Montana (1), Tex McKenzie (2), Antonino Rocca (1), Pat O'Connor (1), Yukon Eric, (2), Bobo Brazil (1), Bernard Vigal, (1), and Ilio Dipaolo (4)
  - NWA International Tag Team Championship (Toronto version) (9 times) - with Yukon Eric (1), Bill Soloweyko (1), Billy Red Lyons (1), Bruno Sammartino (1), Johnny Valentine (2), Bulldog Brower (2), and Mark Lewin (1)
- National Wrestling Alliance
  - NWA World Heavyweight Championship (1 time)
- NWA All-Star Wrestling
  - NWA Canadian Tag Team Championship (Vancouver version) (1 time) - with Dan Miller
- Professional Wrestling Hall of Fame
  - Class of 2015
- Ontario Sports Hall of Fame
  - Class of 1995
- Stampede Wrestling
  - NWA Canadian Heavyweight Championship (Calgary version) (1 time)
  - Stampede Wrestling Hall of Fame (Class of 1995)
- Wrestling Observer Newsletter
  - Wrestling Observer Newsletter Hall of Fame (Class of 1996)

== Electoral record ==
1965 Canadian federal election: York East
Party	Candidate	Votes
Liberal	Steve Otto	18,840
Progressive Conservative	William Whipper Watson	15,312
New Democratic Party	William Smith	13,045
Social Credit	R. Beacock	194
