= Maple Leaf Wrestling =

Canadian professional wrestling promotion

- Maple Leaf Wrestling logo
- Founded: 1930
- Defunct: 1984
- Headquarters: Toronto, Ontario, Canada
- Founder: Jack Corcoran
- Owner(s): Jack Corcoran (1930–1939); John Tunney (1939); Frank Tunney (1939–1983); Jack Tunney (1983–1986); Eddie Tunney (1983–1984); WWE Libraries (1984–present)
- Parent: WWE Libraries
- Formerly: Queensbury Athletic Club; Maple Leaf Wrestling

Maple Leaf Wrestling was the unofficial name of a Canadian professional wrestling promotion owned by Frank Tunney and based in Toronto, Ontario, Canada during the 1970s and 1980s. Founded in 1930, Maple Leaf was a territory of the National Wrestling Alliance for much of his history; after Frank's death in 1983, his nephews instead elected to align with the World Wrestling Federation, which acquired the promotion in 1984.

== History ==
=== Queensbury Athletic Club ===
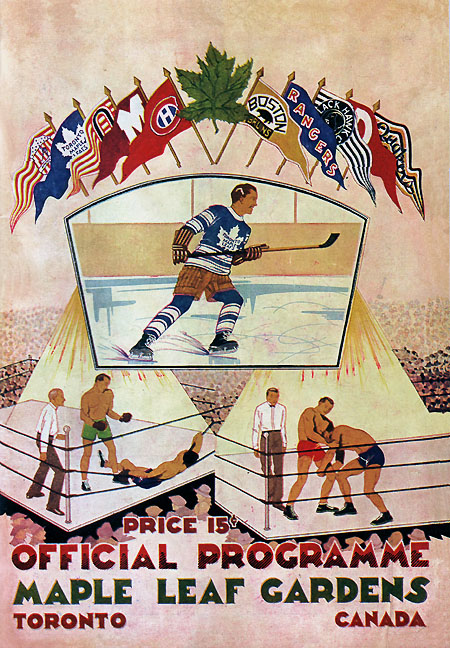
Cover of the program for the first game of the Toronto Maple Leafs at Maple Leaf Gardens (MLG) in 1931. Boxing and wrestling matches, also staple events at MLG for most of its history, are depicted on the cover along with ice hockey imagery.

The promotion, initially known as the Queensbury Athletic Club, traces its roots back to 1930, when it was launched by Jack Corcoran, who had previously promoted boxing in Toronto under the Queensbury name. Initially, Corcoran was involved in a promotional war with rival promoter Ivan Mickailoff, but after Corcoran allied himself with the new Maple Leaf Gardens in 1931, he took control of professional wrestling in Toronto.

The Gardens would remain the main venue for the promotion for more than 60 years. Wrestling kept the Gardens busy on nights when there was no hockey game. Canadian, British Empire and world title matches were all held there.

=== The Tunneys take over ===
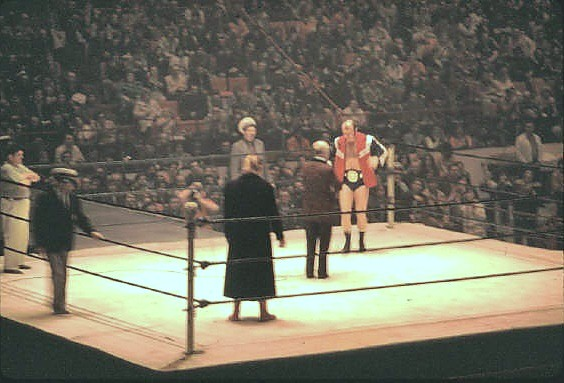
Ring introductions at MLG of the NWA World Heavyweight Championship match between champion Dory Funk, Jr. and challenger Johnny Valentine on February 11, 1973. Note the entrance ramp at left, which was used at MLG decades before it became commonplace in other promotions.

Corcoran stepped down in 1939 and was bought out by his assistants, John and Frank Tunney. John died just a few months later, and the promotion was then run by Frank. Through most of the 1940s and 1950s, Frank Tunney's biggest star was local hero Whipper Billy Watson, who became a two-time world champion. Starting in 1969, the shows were headlined by The Sheik for more than eight years.

In 1978, Tunney began working with promoter Jim Crockett, Jr., who ran Mid-Atlantic Championship Wrestling in the Carolinas. The two would become partners in the Toronto promotion, along with George Scott, a key executive with Crockett who had been a preliminary wrestler for Tunney from 1950 to 1956.

=== Aligning with the World Wrestling Federation ===
Following Frank's death in 1983, the business was run by John's son Jack Tunney and Frank's son, Eddie Tunney. The Tunneys hosted National Wrestling Alliance (NWA) and Mid-Atlantic Wrestling matches until 1984, when Jack Tunney abandoned Crockett and signed with Vince McMahon's expanding World Wrestling Federation, with Jack serving as a figurehead on-air president of the WWF from 1984 to 1995, while also serving as the (legitimate) president of Titan Sports Canada, the local arm of the WWF's parent company.

Following the WWF takeover in 1984, the name Maple Leaf Wrestling continued to be used for the federation's Canadian TV program (a staple of Hamilton station CHCH-TV for many years), which the WWF took over production of after the Tunneys split from the NWA. The show was hosted by Angelo Mosca and Jack Reynolds. TV tapings for the show were held in Brantford and other cities in southern Ontario for the next two years, until the WWF ceased the tapings in 1986 and decided to simply use the Maple Leaf Wrestling name for the Canadian airings of WWF Superstars of Wrestling. In these Canadian episodes there was some Canadian footage, usually matches from Maple Leaf Gardens and updates by on-air announcer and former wrestler Billy Red Lyons. These tapings were the precursor to the WWF's Wrestling Challenge, which became the "B" show to WWF Superstars Of Wrestling. Gorilla Monsoon and Jesse Ventura were the hosts for the Canadian tapings (with Ventura doing his famous "The Body Shop" segment). When those tapings morphed into Challenge in 1986, Ventura was moved to WWF Superstars Of Wrestling. Bobby Heenan replaced Ventura as the Canadian tapings became WWF Wrestling Challenge.

In 1995, McMahon chose to run the shows in Toronto without any involvement from the Tunneys. The final show at the Gardens was held on September 17, 1995.

== Championships ==
Championship	Last Recognized Champion	From	Until	Other names	Notes
NWA British Empire Heavyweight Championship	Whipper Billy Watson	1941	1967		
NWA Canadian Open Tag Team Championship	Ilio DiPaolo and Billy Red Lyons	1952	1961		
NWA United States Heavyweight Championship	The Sheik	1962	1977		
NWA International Tag Team Championship	The Crusaders (Billy Red Lyons and Dewey Robertson)	1961	1977		
NWA Canadian Heavyweight Championship	Angelo Mosca Jr.	1978	1984		
NWA Canadian Television Championship	Brian Adidas	1982	1984		

== See also ==
- Professional wrestling in Canada

== Works cited ==
- Toronto Wrestling History
- Maple Leaf Wrestling - Pictorial & History
- Wrestling-Titles.com: Maple Leaf Wrestling
- Maple Leaf Wrestling retrospective
