= List of former Stampede Wrestling personnel =

Stampede Wrestling was a professional wrestling promotion based in Calgary, Alberta from 1948 to 1990 and from 1999 to 2008. Former employees in Stampede consisted of professional wrestlers, managers, play-by-play and colour commentators, announcers, interviewers and referees.

== Alumni ==
=== Male wrestlers ===
Birth name:	Ring name(s):	Tenure:	Notes
Unknown	Adolph Barbee	1985	
Unknown	Adrian Street	1981	
Art Wilderman	All Canadian Boy	1973	
Unknown	Akam Singh	1988	
Unknown	Al Dolan	1950	
Unknown	Al Goodwin	1965	
Unknown	Al Ward	1963–1964	
Unknown^{†}	Alberto Torres	1960–1961	
Unknown	Alo Leilani	1975–1978; 1986	
Unknown	Andy Rockne	1949	
Unknown	The Animal / Major Cal Manson	1983	
Unknown	Angelo Salvadore	1963	
Unknown	Barrabás	1979–1980	
Unknown	Ben Bassarab	1988-1989	
Unknown	Ben Morgan	1949–1950	
Unknown	Benny Binder	1963; 1965	
Unknown	Bert Warner	1965	
Unknown	Bill Batch	1952–1953; 1955	
Unknown	Bill Condos	1962	
Unknown	Bill Parkas	1962	
Unknown	Bill Sheriff	1951; 1954	
Unknown	Bill Showers	1968	
Unknown	Billy Kohnke	1957	
Unknown	Billy Ventura	1976	
Unknown	Bob Boucher	1976–1979	
Unknown	Bob Corby	1956–1957	
Unknown	Bob DeMarce	1951–1952; 1954	
Unknown	Bob Emory	1989	
Unknown^{†}	Bob Morse / The Viking	1960; 1963–1965	
Unknown	Bob O'Brien	1987	
Unknown	Bob Pettit	1979	
Unknown	Bob Pirie	1972-unknown	
Unknown	Bobby Jones	1966	
Unknown	Boris Korchenko	1983	
Unknown	Boss Hogg	1986	
Unknown	Brad Foster	1986	
Unknown	Brett Sampson	1986	
Unknown	Brian Wardman	1950–1951	
Unknown	Bruce Kirk	1966–1967	
Unknown^{†}	Bruce Swan	1986	
Unknown	Bucky Siegler	1989	
Unknown	Bud Cody	1958; 1965; 1967	
Unknown	Bufford Maddox	1982	
Unknown	Charlie Fox	1967	
Unknown	Charo Rivera	1983	
Unknown	Ched Kid	1963	
Unknown	Chic Scott	1986	
Unknown	Chris Yugo	1963	
Unknown	Christian Briat	1968	
Unknown	Chuck Bruce	1962–1963	
Unknown	Chuck Kitchen	1952	
Unknown	Chuck Marchuk	1968	
Unknown	Chuck McCracken	1967–1968; 1970	
Unknown	Chuck Thomas	1959	
Unknown	Cliff Olson	1953–1954	
Unknown	Cliff Thiede	1949–1950; 1952	
Unknown	Cobra Singh	1964	
Unknown	The Commanchero	1987	
Unknown^{†}	Con Bruno	1951–1955	
Unknown	Dallard Oulette	1949–1951	
Unknown	Dan O'Connor	1950	
Unknown	Dan O'Hara	1962	
Unknown	Dave Broady	1954	
Unknown	Dave Kochen	1981	
Unknown	Dave Martin	1967–1968	
Unknown	Dave Mitchell	1968	
Unknown	Denny Alberts	1978	
Unknown	Dr. Scarlet	1968	
Unknown	Don Griffin	1964	
Unknown	Don Hipkiss	1981	
Unknown^{†}	Don Kindred	1950; 1955–1960	
Unknown^{†}	Don Lee	1955	
Unknown	Don Wayt	1975; 1977	
Unknown	Don White	1983	
Unknown	Doug Lalonde	1966	
Unknown	Duffy O'Rourke	1981	
Unknown^{†}	Duke Myers	1980–1984; 1986–1989	
Unknown^{†}	Earl Malone	1948; 1950	
Unknown	Eddie Sharkey	1963	
Unknown	El Diable	1988	
Unknown	El Falcón	1984	
Unknown	Emil Van Velzen	1950	
Unknown	Emir Badui	1949	
Unknown	Ferenc Varga	1964	
Unknown	Frank Hurley	1951; 1954–1955	
Unknown	Fred Ketterer	1960	
Unknown	Fritz Schnabel	1951–1952	
Unknown	Gene Bowman	1949; 1954	
Unknown	The General	1978	
Unknown	George Bruckman	1955	
Unknown	George Butler	1981	
Unknown	George Iaukea	1975	
Unknown	George Richey	1977–1978	
Unknown	Gerd Topsnik	1963–1965	
Unknown	Golden Greek Dritsas	1964	
Unknown	Gordon Ivey / Poison Ivy	1966–1978	
Unknown^{†}	Ferenc Szikszay	1949; 1955	
Unknown	Hubert Pelzer	1952–1953	
Unknown	Hubert Sester / The Terminator / Toots Jorgenson	1985–1986	
Unknown	The Invader / Randy Webber	1980–1986	
Unknown	Jack Dillon	1955	
Unknown	Jack Foote	1965	
Unknown	Jack Jackson	1950	
Unknown	Jack Kelly	1953	
Unknown	Jack O'Reilly	1958	
Unknown	Jack Weibe / Jack Wiebe	1950–1953	
Unknown	Jake Foley	1981	
Unknown	Jeff Wheeler	1986–1987	
Unknown	Jerry Dritsas	1964	
Unknown	Jerry Johnson	1963	
Unknown	Jerry Puckett	1962	
Unknown	Jesse Jackson	1989	
Unknown	Jim Blackhawk	1964	
Unknown	Jim Contos	1960	
Unknown	Jim Custer	1978	
Unknown	Jim Henry	1951; 1954	
Unknown	Joe Kono	1959–1960	
Unknown	Joe Norris	1980	
Unknown	Joe Troskur	1950–1952	
Unknown	John Baker	1984	
Unknown	John Bartol	1950–1951; 1953	
Unknown	John Brink	1967–1968	
Unknown	John Gillis	1987	
Unknown	John Harvie	1986	
Unknown^{†}	Johnny Demchuck	1959	
Unknown	Johnny Sinclair	1951; 1961	
Unknown	Jonathan Holliday	1986–1989	
Unknown	José Quintero	1969–1970	
Unknown	Josh Logan	1987	
Unknown	J.T. Law	1988–1989	
Unknown	Juan Hernández	1948–1949	
Unknown	Jude Rosenbloom	1981–1982; 1984; 1987	
Unknown	Kam Takida	1959	
Unknown	Karl Karlsson	1954; 1957	
Unknown	Ken Johnson	1986–1989	
Unknown	Ken Lorimer	1957; 1959–1961	
Unknown	Ken Williams	1953	
Unknown	Kevin Stewart	1984	
Unknown	Kim Schau	1988–1989	
Unknown	Larry Jones	1979	
Unknown	Larry Lane	1973–1979	
Unknown	Lee Carlson	1965	
Unknown	Lefty Pacer	1950–1951	
Leonard Hardlotte	Len Crazy Blood / Len Crazy Horse	1987; 1989	
Unknown	Lenny Guilmette	1986	
Unknown	Lindy Calder	1972–1979; 1982	
Unknown^{†}	Lloyd Yakimovich	1949–1950	
Unknown	Lone Eagle	1979–1980	
Unknown^{†}	Lou Laird	1949	
Unknown^{†}	Luis Hernández	1963–1964	
Unknown	The Mad Professor / The Nutty Professor	1963	
Unknown	The Manchurian	1963	
Unknown	Mandingo	1980–1981	
Unknown	Marcel Trudeau / Paul Trudeau	1969	
Unknown	The Masked Outlaw	1989	
Unknown	The Masked Rider	1989	
Unknown	Mike McGuirk	1986; 1988	
Unknown	Mr. Grizzly	1959–1960	
Unknown	The Mongolian	1963	
Unknown	Nick Harris	1953–1958; 1961–1963; 1965	
Unknown	Nick Kilonis	1961	
Unknown	Nick Menace Jr.	1982	
Unknown	Nick Miller	1962	
Unknown	Ninja Maniac	1985	
Unknown^{†}	Otto Kuss	1952	
Unknown	Pat O'Brien / Rene Lorenz	1964; 1971	
Unknown	Paul DeGalles / Paul DeGaulles	1962; 1967	
Unknown^{†}	Pedro Ortega	1949	
Unknown	Pierre LaChappelle	1961–1962	
Unknown	Prince Moses Moli	1986	
Unknown	Ramon Cernados	1961	
Unknown	Randy Thatcher	1987–1988	
Unknown	Ravi Shenkar	1988	
Unknown	Ray Lanier	1980	
Unknown	Ray Marshall	1950	
Unknown	Red Gardner	1959	
Unknown	The Red Phantom	1949	
Unknown	Red Taylor	1960–1961	
Unknown	Rennie Marr	1964; 1967	
Unknown	Reyes García	1954	
Unknown	Rich Laumann	1988	
Unknown	Rich Moreau	1975	
Unknown	Richie Anderson	1989	
Unknown	Ricky Rice	1989	
Unknown	Ricky Waldo	1956; 1961–1965	
Unknown	Roberto Gonzales	1966–1967	
Unknown	Rocky Brewer	1981	
Unknown	Roger Irvine	1959	
Unknown	Ronnie Lee	1980	
Unknown	Roy Forrest	1953–1954	
Unknown	Roy Redcrow	1990	
Unknown	Rudy Burke	1982	
Unknown	Russell Miller	1968–1970; 1972	
Unknown^{†}	Sándor Fozó	1954–1955	
Unknown	Scarlett O'Hara	1963	
Unknown	Scavenger	1981	
Bart Steiger	Skull Mason	1989	
Unknown	Sonny Pascua	1961; 1963	
Unknown	The Spartan	1961	
Unknown	Stan Wurth	1953	
Unknown	Stavros Gialelis	1987	
Unknown^{†}	Steve Gillespie	1989	
Unknown	Steve Kosti	1959–1962	
Unknown	Steve Novak	1977–1980	
Unknown	Steve Renaud	1988	
Unknown	Steve Taylor	1982	
Unknown^{†}	Sylvano Sousa	1982	
Unknown	The Terrible Turk	1968	
Unknown	Terry Rainier	1960	
Unknown	Terry Sawyer	1979	
Unknown	Texas Red Miller	1980	
Unknown	T.G. Stone / Tucker G. Stone	1980–1982	
Unknown	Tiger Singh	1966	
Unknown^{†}	Tom Stanton	1979-1982, 1984	
Unknown	Tommy Ferrara	1988	
Unknown	Tony Rocco	1982	
Unknown	The UFO	1976–1977	
Vern Warner	Vern Warner	1965-1968	
Unknown	Wally Steele	1960	
Unknown	The Warrior	1989	
Unknown	White Lightning	1987	
Unknown	Whitey Dropko	1951–1954	
Unknown	Willie Seymour	1987–1988	
Unknown	Zebra Kid, Jr.	1967	
Ángel Acevedo	The Cuban Assassin	1976–1989	
Gabriel Acocella^{†}	Jack Britton	1951; 1953	
Katsuji Adachi^{†}	Mr. Hito	1973–1979; 1981–1988	
Jack Adkisson^{†}	Fritz Von Erich	1955–1956	
Roy Lee Albern^{†}	Ripper Collins	1976	
Edward Albers	Ed Miller	1957–1958; 1960	
Gary Albright^{†}	Vokhan Singh	1988–1989	
Albert Alexinis^{†}	Al Smith	1956–1957	
Michael Allen	Mike Allen	1983	
Richard Allen	Sandy Beach (wrestler)	1989	
Walter Allen^{†}	John Smith / Soldat Gorky	1956–1957; 1960–1962; 1965	
Jack Altinger^{†}	Jack Allen	1954	
Brad Anderson	Brad Anderson	1988	
Don Anderson^{†}	Ox Anderson	1958; 1961; 1966	
Gene Anderson^{†}	Gene Anderson	1961; 1963	
Jason Anderson	Blackheart Destruction / Jason Anderson	1989–1990	
Leonard Anderson^{†}	Leo Numa	1953	
Thomas Andersen	Scorpion / Tom Andrews	1966	
Ray Andrews	Ray Andrews	1951; 1956; 1959	
B.J. Annis	B.J. Annis	1986–1987	
John Anson	John Anson / Karl Von Shotz	1971–1972; 1976	
Orest Antonation	Bill Cody	1971; 1973–1977; 1980; 1982; 1984; 1986–1987	
Mitsukazu Arakawa^{†}	Mitsu Arakawa	1957–1958	
Ted Arcidi	Ted Arcidi	1986–1987	
Simeon Ardelean	El Mongol / The Mongol	1961; 1963	
Victor Arko	Mike Kelly	1974–1975	
William Arko^{†}	Pat Kelly	1974–1975	
Daniel Arteaga^{†}	Chico Garcia	1954–1961; 1963	
Charles Ashenoff	Konnan the Great	1989	
Anthony Aurelio^{†}	Tony Aurelia / Tony Nero	1957; 1962–1963	
Nedelko Babic^{†}	Danny Babich / Igor Volkoff	1970–1974; 1976–1978; 1983	
Vince Bagala^{†}	Vince Montana	1961–1962	
Adrien Baillargeon^{†}	Adrien Baillargeon	1955–1957	
Antonio Baillargeon^{†}	Tony Baillargeon	1956–1958	
Jean Baillargeon^{†}	Jean Baillargeon	1952–1954; 1958	
Lionel Baillargeon^{†}	Lionel Baillargeon	1952–1953	
Paul Baillargeon^{†}	Paul Baillargeon	1951–1952	
Douglas Baker^{†}	Bob Baker / The Ox	1968–1969	
Dennis Baldock	Bob Pringle / Bobby Bass	1970–1976; 1980; 1984	
Jimmie Banks^{†}	Kasavubu / Tiger Jackson	1977–1978; 1980	
Craig Baranieski	Craig Jamieson / Gus Jamieson	1986–1990	
Mark Barber	Terry Adonis	1983	
Antonio Barichievich^{†}	Antonio the Great / The Great Antonio	1959	
Ferrin Barr^{†}	Sandy Barr	1966	
Patrick Barrett	Paddy Barrett	1965	
Roland Barriault	Frenchy Lamonte / Frenchy Simard / Marcel Semard	1963; 1968; 1970; 1974; 1977; 1981	
Ben Bassarab	Ben Bassarab	1983–1987	
Rolland Bastien^{†}	Red Bastien	1965	
Myron Batesole^{†}	The Cardiff Giant	1948–1950; 1952	
Wilfred Bath^{†}	Fisherboy / Willie Bath	1962	
Sydney Batt^{†}	Steve Rickard	1964	
Robert Baxter^{†}	Laverne Baxter	1949–1950	
Robert Bédard^{†}	Rene Goulet	1986 ^{WWF}	
Steve Bellman^{†}	Steve Bellman	1950–1954	
Jeff Beltzner^{†}	Brick Bronsky	1987–1988	
John Bence	Jack Bence	1956–1957; 1969–1971	
Chris Benoit^{†}	Chris Benoit	1985–1990	
Barney Bernard	Barney Ostby	1949–1952	
Herbert Betsinger^{†}	Jack McDonald	1949; 1951; 1953	
Dick Beyer^{†}	The Destroyer	1973	
Antonino Biasetton^{†}	Antonino Rocca	1961	
Tom Billington^{†}	The Dynamite Kid	1978–1984; 1985–1986 ^{WWF} 1988–1989	
Vince Billotto	Vinnie Valentino	1988–1989	
Frank Earl Black	Earl Black	1971	
Steve Blackman	Steve Blackman	1988–1989	
Joe Blanchard^{†}	Joe Blanchard	1953–1955	
Nick Bockwinkel^{†}	Nick Bockwinkel	1961–1962; 1981–1983	
Warren Bockwinkel^{†}	Warren Bockwinkel	1953–1954	
Aldo Bogni^{†}	Aldo Bogni	1955; 1962	
Edward Bogucki^{†}	Ivan Kalmikoff	1958; 1960; 1964	
George Bollas^{†}	George Bollas / The Zebra Kid	1954; 1967	
Terry Bollea	Hulk Hogan	1986 ^{WWF}	
Steve Bolus^{†}	Steve Bolus / Rory Hunter	1959; 1961	
William Borders^{†}	Jim Grabmire	1962	
Oscar Bourdage^{†}	Jean LaSalle	1963–1966	
Shayne Bower^{†}	Beef Wellington / Biff Wellington / Dick Wellington	1986–1990	
Wayde Bowles^{†}	Rocky Johnson	1966	
Bob Bradley	John Dane	1961–1962	
Dino Bravo^{†}	Dino Bravo	1962	
Malcolm Brenner	Farmer Brenner / Mal Brenner	1958	
Daniel Briley	Danny Davis	1982–1984	
Jack Brisco^{†}	Jack Brisco	1974–1975	
Tim Brooks^{†}	Killer Tim Brooks	1977	
Bob Brown^{†}	"Bulldog" Bob Brown	1969; 1971; 1989	
Kerry Brown^{†}	Kerry Brown	1981–1989	
Orville Brown^{†}	Orville Brown	1949	
Guy Brunetti^{†}	Guy Brunetti	1958; 1961	
Phil Buckley^{†}	Buck Robley	1973–1974	
Charles Buffong^{†}	Charles Buffong / Otis Taylor / Otis Young	1980–1983	
Bob Bulat	Bob Bulat / Mechanic #1	1985–1986	
Jeff Bulat	Jeff Bulat / Mechanic #2	1986–1987	
Samson Burke	Sammy Berg	1957	
Axel Cadier^{†}	Alex Cadier	1954	
William Calhoun^{†}	Haystacks Calhoun	1963	
Roy Callender	Roy Callender	1975–1976	
Larry Cameron^{†}	Larry Cameron	1987–1989	
Ian Campbell^{†}	Ian Campbell	1957–1959	
Joe Campbell	Joe Campbell	1952–1953	
David Cannell	David Patterson	1980	
Ali Ahmet Çapraz^{†}	Ali Bey	1950; 1956	
Primo Carnera^{†}	Primo Carnera	1955; 1962	
Bob Carson^{†}	Bob Sweetan	1965–1971	
Tom Cassett^{†}	Teijo Khan	1989	
Pedro Castillo^{†}	Fidel Castillo	1978; 1980	
John Castro	Johnny Love	1989	
John Charyszyn^{†}	Andre Zvezda	1979–1980	
Alfonso Chicharro^{†}	Hercules Romero	1963	
Joseph Chorre, Jr.^{†}	Suni War Cloud	1950; 1955	
Ted Christy	Ted Christy	1953; 1955–1956; 1964; 1967	
Vic Christy	Vic Christy	1967	
Allen Coage^{†}	Bad News Allen	1982–1984; 1985–1988	
William Cobb^{†}	Happy Farmer Humphrey	1958	
Derrell Cochran	Derrell Cochran	1968–1969	
Ryland Coffield^{†}	Jim Coffield	1953	
Eldridge Coleman	Wayne Coleman	1970	
Randy Colley^{†}	Randy Colley	1989	
Rocco Colombo^{†}	Rocky Columbo	1963–1964	
Nelson Combs^{†}	Nelson Royal	1959–1960; 1978–1979	
Jim Conroy	Jim Conroy / Killer Conroy / Killer McCoy	1959; 1964	
Jean-Louis Cormier^{†}	Rudy Kay	1966; 1968	
Leonce Cormier	Batman / Leo Burke	1966–1970; 1974; 1977–1983; 1985–1988	
Romeo Cormier^{†}	Bobby Burke / Norton Jackson	1967–1968; 1977–1978; 1980–1981	
Yvon Cormier^{†}	The Beast	1966–1968; 1977	
Theodore Cosenza^{†}	Tony Cosenza	1950	
Giacomo Costa^{†}	Al Costello	1957; 1964–1965; 1971	
John Cozman^{†}	John Cosman	1983; 1985–1988	
Arnold Cream^{†}	Joe Walcott	1959; 1967	
John Cretoria^{†}	Hajha Baba / Haji Baba	1962	
Ion Croitoru^{†}	Orhan Turgedan / Orhan Tugdekyn	1984; 1986	
Ruben Cruz^{†}	Hercules Ayala	1977–1985, 2000	
Frank Cullen	Robbie Stewart	1981–1982; 1986	
Chick Curcuru^{†}	Chick Garibaldi	1956–1957	
Hubert Curtis^{†}	Bud Curtis	1958	
Angelo Curto^{†}	Martino Angelo	1956–1959	
Jack Danielson^{†}	Black Jack Daniels	1961	
William Davis^{†}	Willie Davis	1957	
Chris Davros^{†}	Babe Zaharias	1949	
John da Silva^{†}	John da Silva	1961	
Alfred DeBenedetti^{†}	Tony Verdi	1949	
Gerry Dellaserra	Rocky Della Serra	1980	
Edward Denton	Lynn Denton	1980	
Dominic DeNucci^{†}	Dominic Bravo	1962–1963	
Michael DiBiase^{†}	Mike DiBiase	1958	
Ilio DiPaolo^{†}	Ilio DiPaolo	1954–1955	
Steve DiSalvo	Steve DiSalvo	1986–1989	
Joseph DiTommaso^{†}	The Bat / Tiger Joe Tomasso	1952–1960; 1963–1964; 1970–1980	
Anthony Dobie^{†}	Jim Dobie	1949	
Doug Donnan^{†}	Doug Donnan / Doug Donovan	1952–1953	
Joe Dorsetti^{†}	Gypsy Joe	1960	
Andrew Douglas^{†}	Andrew Douglas	1975	
William Dromo^{†}	Bill Dromo	1963–1965; 1969–1970	
Gene DuBuque^{†}	Gene Dubuque	1950–1951	
Robert Duranton	The Magnificent Robert / Robert of Paris	1962	
Yvon Durelle^{†}	Yvon Durelle	1962	
Bill Eadie	Masked Superstar	1984	
Joseph Eakins^{†}	Ike Eakins / The Masked Destroyer	1957; 1963	
Robert Ellis	Bob Elliot	1958	
Douglas Embry	Eric Embry	1979–1980	
Ulualoaiga Emelio^{†}	Tami Samoa	1977	
Wayne Ermatinger	Michel Hammer / Mike Hammer	1978; 1981–1983; 1985–1987	
Felipe Estrada	El Canek	1986	
Ronald Etchison, Sr.^{†}	Ron Etchison / Ronnie Etchinson	1962–1963	
Edward Ethefier	Eddie Morrow	1975–1977	
Gerard Ethifier	Gerry Morrow / Jerry Morrow	1975–1979; 1981–1990	
Edward Faieta^{†}	Ed Gardenia	1953–1954	
Willie Farkas^{†}	Bill Farkas	1964	
Wayne Farris	Honky Tonk Wayne	1982–1983; 1985–1986	
William Faynik^{†}	Cyclops	1960	
Raymond Fernandez^{†}	Hercules	1986 ^{WWF}	
Daniel Ferrazzo	Danny Ferrazza	1954; 1958–1960	
Scott Ferris	Scott Ferris / Mad Max Ferris	1982–1984	
Ron Finch	Ron Finch	1970–1973	
Harry Finkelstein	El Hombre Montana	1957–1958	
Oattem Fisher	Oattem Fisher	1960–1962	
Francisco Flores	Francisco Flores	1983	
Mario Fornini^{†}	Angelo Savoldi	1961	
Dennis Forsland^{†}	Eric the Great	1959–1960; 1964	
John Fotie^{‡}	John Foti	1955–1963; 1966–1969	
Kit Fox^{†}	Chief Kit Fox	1960	
Patrick Fraley	Pat Fraley	1955–1956	
Edmund Francis^{†}	Ed Francis	1960–1961	
Keith Franke^{†}	Adrian Adonis	1984; 1986 ^{WWF}	
Rudolph Freed	Rudy Diamond	1986 ^{WWF}	
Earl Patrick Freeman^{†}	Paddy Ryan	1976; 1978	
Erich Froelich	Eric Froelich / Ricky Rommel	1963–1965; 1971	
Yasuyuki Fujii	Colonel Yan Kee / Yasuyuki Fujii	1973; 1979–1980	
Tatsumi Fujinami	Tatsumi Fujinami	1979; 1983	
Dory Funk^{†}	The Outlaw	1961	
Dory Funk Jr.	Dory Funk Jr.	1969–1972; 1974; 1976; 1978–1979	
Terry Funk	Terry Funk	1976	
John Gabor	Fritz von Ulm	1956–1957	
Jean Gagné^{†}	Don Gagné, Francois Marquis	1972; 1975–1979	
George Gallagher^{†}	Mike Gallagher	1956	
John Gallagher^{†}	Doc Gallagher	1956	
Hubert Gallant	Hubert Gallant	1977–1985	
Francisco García^{†}	Frank Butcher / The Shadow	1971–1974; 1976–1977	
Raúl Reyes García	Scorpion II	1977	
Charles Geoghegan^{†}	Tim Geohagen	1955; 1957–1958; 1961; 1965	
John Gibson, Jr.^{†}	Stu Gibson	1950; 1954	
Richard Gland^{†}	Bulldog Brower	1961; 1974	
Steve Gobrukovich^{†}	Steve Gob	1950–1951; 1955	
Emile Goguen	Emile Dupre	1966–1967; 1970–1971	
Cecil Goldstick^{†}	Cecil Goldstick / Tiger Goldstick	1949–1951	
José Gómez	Tony Russo	1984	
Carlos González	Carlos Belafonte / Carlos Colón	1970–1974	
Luther Goodall^{†}	Luther Lindsay	1955–1960; 1967	
William Goodman^{†}	Big Bad John	1975	
George Gordienko^{†}	George Gordienko	1952–1958; 1962; 1969; 1972–1973	
Archie Gouldie^{†}	Archie Gouldie / The Stomper	1962; 1967–1969; 1971–1974; 1976; 1980; 1983–1984	
Walter Grebek	Jan Gotch	1956–1957; 1962; 1964	
Robert Grimbley^{†}	Cyclone Smith	1960	
Neil Guay	Neil Guay / J.P. Durelle / The Towering Inferno	1975–1979	
Audley Hader^{†}	Jack Hader	1955	
John Hady^{†}	Jim Hady	1955; 1965	
Dennis Hall	Magnificent Max	1962	
Heigo Hamaguchi	Higo Hamaguchi	1976–1977; 1983	
Eddie Hammil	Kung Fu	1981–1982	
Larry Hamilton^{†}	Assassin #2	1976	
Ib Solvang Hansen^{†}	Eric the Red / Ike Hansen	1960–1961; 1968	
John Stanley Hansen II	Stan Hansen	1979	
Susumu Hara^{†}	Fighting Hara	1978	
George Hardison^{†}	Seelie Samara	1951–1952; 1954	
James Harris^{†}	Kamala	1984 ^{WWF}	
Bret Hart	Bret Hart	1976–1984; 1985–1987 ^{WWF}	
Bruce Hart	Bruce Hart	1972–1984; 1985–1990	
Keith Hart	Keith Hart	1973–1984; 1985–1989	
Owen Hart^{†}	Owen Hart / The Avenger	1986–1989	
Ross Hart	Ross Hart / Ross Lindsey	1985–1988	
Smith Hart^{†}	Smith Hart	1973–1983	
Stu Hart^{†}	Stu Hart	1948–1960; 1967; 1969–1973; 1975–1979; 1983; 1986	
Hiroshi Hase	Hiroshi Hase	1986–1987	
Shinya Hashimoto^{†}	Hashif Khan	1987–1988	
Dale Hey^{†}	Dale Hayes	1967	
Erwin Hayes	Gil Hayes	1967–1970; 1972; 1976–1977; 1979; 1985	
William Haynes III	Bill Haynes / Billy Jack Haynes	1982; 1986	
Don Heaton^{†}	Don Leo Jonathan	1959–1960; 1964–1965; 1968	
Laurence Heffernan^{†}	Roy Heffernan	1955–1958; 1964–1965	
John Henning^{†}	John Paul Henning	1956–1958	
Lawrence Hennig^{†}	Larry Hennig	1961	
Doug Hepburn^{†}	Doug Hepburn	1955–1957; 1959	
Bernard Herman^{†}	Ricki Starr	1959	
Robert Hermann^{†}	Hans Hermann	1962	
Francisco Hernández^{†}	Sugi Sito	1971–1972	
Jerry Hester	Jim Starr	1966	
Frank Hickey^{†}	Frank Hickey	1950	
Lee Higgins^{†}	Bud Higgins / Butch Higgins	1949; 1953	
Maury High^{†}	Rocket Monroe	1961	
Shigehisa Higo^{†}	Mach Hayato	1982	
Dean Higuchi^{†}	Dean Higuchi	1968	
James Hillman	Mike Miller	1982–1983	
John Hindley	Johnny Smith	1986–1989	
James Hines	Bobby Fulton	1980	
Junji Hirata	Sonny Two Rivers / Strong Machine	1983–1985	
Kevin Hobbs	KJ Anderssen	1980–1982	
Allan Hobman^{†}	Al Hobman	1969	
Ronald Hogg^{†}	George Drake / Ronnie McGregor	1948; 1955–1956	
Stan Holek^{†}	Stan Lisowski / Stan Neilson	1958; 1963; 1967	
Eric Holmback^{†}	Yukon Eric	1953; 1956–1957	
Frank Hoy^{†}	Black Angus Campbell	1971; 1976–1977	
Ray Hrstich^{†}	Dick Hrstich	1956–1959	
Leonard Hughes^{†}	Len Hughes	1958	
Dick Huffman^{†}	Dick Huffman	1956–1958	
Timothy Hunt^{†}	The Hunter	1989	
Clyde Hurle^{†}	Kangaroo Kennedy	1962	
Wes Hutchings	Hartford Love	1976	
Richard Hutton^{†}	Dick Hutton	1957–1960	
Con Iakovidis	Con Kovidis	1986	
Curtis Iaukea^{†}	Curtis Iaukea	1975	
Nedelco Ilitch^{†}	Nick Elitch	1950	
Kanji Inoki	Antonio Inoki	1979; 1983	
Sueo Inoue	Mighty Inoue	1977	
Barney Irwin	Bill Irwin	1981	
Karl Istaz^{†}	Karl Gotch	1964–1965	
Don Jardine^{†}	Don Jardine	1959	
Gregory Jarque^{†}	Gregory Jarque	1956	
Kevin Jeffries	Kevin Jeffries	1984	
Brian Jewel	Joe Ventura	1977; 1979–1980	
William Jodoin	Bill Jodoin	1980–1983; 1987–1989	
James Johnson^{†}	Luke Graham	1963	
Gervaise Jones^{†}	Jack Ruffin / The Masked Mauler	1975; 1977	
Harvey Jones^{†}	Buck Jones / Harvey Jones	1964; 1966–1973	
Marty Jones	Marty Jones	1979	
Tommy Lee Jones	Jeff Gouldie	1983	
Victor Jovica	Victor Jovica	1971–1972; 1974	
Francis Julian^{†}	Frank Marconi / Gorilla Marconi	1949–1954; 1970	
Juan Kachmanian^{†}	Pampero Firpo	1977	
George Kahaumia^{†}	Taro Miyaki	1963	
Zoltán Kájel^{†}	Maurice LaChappelle	1951–1952	
Don Kalt^{†}	Don Fargo	1975	
McRonald Kamaka^{†}	Tor Kamata	1972–1977	
Walter Kameroff	Walter Kameroff	1952–1953	
Harold Kanusius	Harold Cannon / Thunderbolt Cannon	1970–1977	
Arthur Kapitanopolis	Art Kapitan	1953	
John Karney^{†}	Ivan Kameroff / Ivan Volkoff	1950; 1954–1955; 1963–1965	
Lawrence Kasaboski^{†}	Larry Kasaboski	1960	
Abe Kashey^{†}	Abe Kashey	1949	
Joseph Katelmach^{†}	Joe Corbett	1950–1953	
Toshiaki Kawada	Black Mephisto / Kio Kawada	1986	
Bill Kazmaier	Bill Kazmaier	1986–1987	
Gary, LeMottee	The Scorpion	1985-1986	
Masao Kimura^{†}	Rusher Kimura	1983–1984	
Gene Kiniski^{†}	Gene Kiniski	1953; 1957–1962; 1965; 1967–1969; 1976–1980; 1982	
Kelly Kiniski	Kelly Kiniski	1980–1981	
Tatsumi Kitahara	Sumo Hara	1989	
Louis Klein^{†}	Lou Klein	1957–1958	
Russell Knorr^{†}	Tiny Anderson	1983	
Herbert Knotts^{†}	Buddy Knox	1957	
Kuniaki Kobayashi	Kuniaki Kobayashi	1983	
Wilson Kohlbrecher^{†}	Wilson Kohlbrecher	1961	
Yasuhiro Kojima^{†}	Hiro Matsuda	1975	
Dimitar Dimitrov	Don Kolov	1982–1983	
Abraham Korman^{†}	Al Korman	1950; 1958	
George Kosti^{†}	George Kosti	1959–1964	
Ioanis Kostolias^{†}	Johnny Kostas	1962–1963; 1965–1966	
Matthew Kostrencich^{†}	Matt Murphy	1952; 1954	
Sándor Kovács^{†}	Sándor Kovács	1962; 1964–1965; 1969	
Roger Kowarko^{†}	Buddy Bison	1963	
Dan Kroffat	Dan Kroffat	1969–1973; 1975–1980; 1985–1986	
Richard Krupa	Golden Grappler / Vladimir Krupoff	1986	
Jack Krys	Killer Jack Kris	1959–1962; 1964–1970	
John Kurgis^{†}	Sonny Kurgis	1948	
Louis LaCourse	Duke Savage	1974–1975; 1979	
Philip Lafond	Black Sabbath / Phil Lafleur	1983–1985; 1987–1988	
Frankie Laine^{†}	Frankie Laine	1975–1976	
Wallace Lam Ho^{†}	Oni Wiki Wiki	1955; 1959	
Florian Langevin^{†}	Bob Langevin / Legs Langevin	1952; 1960	
Maurice LaPointe	Maurice LaPointe	1957–1961	
James LaRock^{†}	Jim LaRock	1958–1959	
Guy Larose^{†}	Guy Ross	1949; 1951	
José Laureano	Carlos Peron / Chicky Peron	1980; 1982	
Louis Laurence	Louis Laurence	1978–1979; 1984	
Don Leeds^{†}	Don McClarity	1962–1963	
Robert Leedy^{†}	Sky Hi Lee	1951–1952; 1955–1956	
Paul Lehman	Paul Diamond	1967	
Robert Leipler^{†}	Bob Leipler	1953	
Antone Leone^{†}	Antone Leone / Ripper Leone	1954; 1961	
Ed Leslie	Brutus Beefcake	1986 ^{WWF}	
Mark Lewin	Mark Lewin	1962; 1975	
Dale Lewis^{†}	Dale Lewis	1979	
Jerry Linden^{†}	Jerry Aitken	1959–1960	
Rick Link	Squasher Link	1987	
Douglas Lindzy^{†}	Doug Lindsay / Doug Lindsey	1961	
Ted Lipscomb^{†}	MX-1 / Ted Allen	1983	
Reginald Lisowski^{†}	Reggie Lisowski	1958	
Danny Little Bear^{†}	Danny Little Bear	1974	
Jack Lloyd^{†}	Danno O'Shocker	1957–1958	
Steve Logan	Steve Logan	1983	
Daniel López^{†}	Vince Lopez	1956–1957	
Pedro Godoy López^{†}	Pedro Godoy	1955–1956	
Roberto López	Pepe Pérez	1962–1963	
Bob Lortie^{†}	Bob Lortie	1949–1950	
Paul Lortie^{†}	Paul Lortie	1950–1951	
Yvon Losier^{†}	Maurice Roberre	1952	
Norman Lowndes^{†}	Norman Frederick Charles III	1977–1979; 1983	
Bob Lueck	Bob Lueck	1970–1972	
Bronko Lupsity^{†}	Bronko Lubich / Count Alexis Bruga	1954; 1962	
Luigi Macera^{†}	Luigi Macera	1960	
George Macricostas^{†}	George Macricostas	1953	
Tom Magee	Tom Magee	1985–1986	
Auleaga Maiava^{†}	Prince Maivia	1955–1958	
Leslie Malady	Les Thatcher	1962	
Peter Managoff^{†}	Pete Managoff	1949–1950; 1952–1953	
Pantaleon Manlapig^{†}	Pantaleon Manlapig	1948	
William Marchuk	Bill Marchuk	1967–1971	
Robert Marella^{†}	Gino Marella	1961	
Joe Marsh^{†}	Joe Marsh	1948; 1951–1952	
Salvatore Martino^{†}	Salvatore Bellomo	1977–1978	
Jerry Matthews^{†}	Jerry Graham	1962–1963; 1966	
Steven May	Steve Ray	1989	
Earl Maynard	Earl Maynard	1969	
Mikhaił Mazurkiewicz^{†}	Mike Mazurki	1948	
George McArthur^{†}	George McArthur	1958	
Roy McClarty^{†}	Roy McClarty	1951; 1961; 1964–1965	
Robert McCoy^{†}	Bibber McCoy	1949	
Earl McCready^{†}	Earl McCready	1949–1955	
James McDonald^{†}	Danno McDonald	1961	
Mike McGee	Mike McGee	1956–1957	
Stephen McGill^{†}	Steve McGill	1954	
Patrick McGill^{†}	Pat McGill	1948–1956	
Richard McGraw^{†}	Rick McGraw	1984 ^{WWF}	
Frank McKenzie^{†}	Tex McKenzie	1954–1955; 1964	
Dave McKigney^{†}	Dave DuBois / Gene DuBois / Jacques DuBois / Pierre Dubois	1959; 1964; 1968–1969	
Paul McManus^{†}	Frank Morgan	1962	
Pat Meehan^{†}	Pat Meehan	1954–1958	
Gerald Meeker^{†}	Jerry Meeker	1948–1950	
Gilberto Melendez^{†}	Gypsy Joe	1976–1977	
Edward Melowsky^{†}	Pat Murphy	1958; 1961	
Frank Menacker^{†}	Sammy Menacker	1949; 1956–1957	
Bob Merrill^{†}	Rip Miller	1959–1961	
Arthur Michalik^{†}	Art Mahalik / Art Michalik	1958	
Omar Mijares	Omar Atlas	1973–1974	
Robert Mike^{†}	Bob Mike	1953–1954	
Bill Miller^{†}	Bill Miller	1957–1960	
Daniel Miller^{†}	Dan Miller	1957; 1959	
Peter Miller	Peter Flowers	1984	
Walter Millich^{†}	Joe Millich	1959–1960; 1962–1963; 1968	
John Minton^{†}	Big John Studd	1986 ^{WWF}	
Felix Miquet^{†}	Felix Miquet	1950	
Francois Miquet^{†}	Francois Miquet	1949–1950; 1952	
Adolph Mittlestadt^{†}	Al Mills	1948–1960	
Henry Mittelstadt^{†}	Tiny Mills	1949; 1951–1954; 1957–1958; 1961	
Herbert Moeller	Hans Schnabel	1958	
Karl Moffat	Butch Moffat / Jason the Terrible	1983–1990	
Domingo Molina	Raoul Castillo	1978	
George Momberg^{†}	Karl Von Krupp / Karl Krupp	1971; 1974–1975	
Edward Montimayor	Pepe Montez	1967	
Pedro Morales^{†}	Pedro Morales	1986 ^{WWF}	
Lorigo Morelli^{†}	Tony Morelli	1957	
Masanori Morimura	Black Tomcat	1988	
David Morgan^{†}	Dave Morgan	1983	
Wilbur Morgan	Toar Morgan	1953–1955; 1960–1961	
Jim Morris	Jim Morris	1983	
Bob Morrison	Bob Wayne	1986	
Don Morrison	Beautiful Brutus / Luke Morrison / Lumberjack Luke	1972; 1976	
James Morrison	J. J. Dillon	1977–1978; 1981	
Angelo Mosca^{†}	Angelo Mosca	1969–1970; 1974–1975; 1984	
John Mucciacciaro^{†}	Johnny Moochy	1952	
Nikita Mulkovitch	Nikita Kalmikoff	1962; 1965	
Don Muraco	Don Muraco	1988–1989	
Akio Murasaki	Great Saki	1974	
Frank Murdoch^{†}	Frankie Murdoch	1949; 1954	
Hoyt Murdoch^{†}	Dick Murdoch	1984 ^{WWF}	
John Murphy^{†}	Skull Murphy	1954	
Lloyd Murphy^{†}	Gene Murphy	1961	
Stan Mykietovitch^{†}	Moose Morowski / Stan Mykietovitch	1967; 1971; 1973–1974; 1976–1979; 1984	
Stan Myslajek^{†}	Stan Myslajek	1950	
Nick Nader^{†}	Nick Albert	1950–1960	
Bronko Nagurski^{†}	Bronko Nagurski	1951	
Czaya Nandor^{†}	Czaya Nandor	1961–1962; 1964	
Jim Neidhart^{†}	Jim Neidhart	1979–1985	
Arthur Nelson^{†}	Art Neilson / The Super Destroyer	1963; 1965; 1967; 1979	
Bobby Nelson^{†}	Bobby Nelson	1951	
Newman^{†}	Leo Newman	1963	
Duke Noble	Duke Noble / Earl of Noble	1964–1965	
Robert Nutt^{†}	Ron Starr	1984–1987; 1989	
Greg Nykoliation	Eddie Watts	1989	
Reino Nyman^{†}	Lou Newman	1948–1950; 1955–1958	
Patrick O'Connor^{†}	Pat O'Connor	1956–1957; 1959–1961; 1968; 1978	
Homer O'Dell^{†}	Homer O'Dell	1962	
Mike O'Leary^{†}	Mike York	1978	
Tommy O'Toole^{†}	Tommy O'Toole	1952–1954; 1956; 1961–1962	
Larry Oliver, Sr.^{†}	Rip Oliver	1984	
Albert Olsen^{†}	Ole Olsen	1953; 1955	
Tod Olsen	Todd Olson	1987	
Len Olson	Len St. Clair	1989	
Juan Onaindia^{†}	Juan Sebastian	1964–1965	
Jesús Ortega^{†}	Mighty Ursus	1955–1957; 1959–1967; 1970–1972; 1975	
Bob Orton^{†}	Bob Orton	1958	
Randal Orton^{†}	The Zodiac	1987	
William Osborne	Bud Osborne	1960–1963; 1965; 1967–1974; 1977–1978	
Ray Osborne	Ray Osborne	1960–1963; 1968–1970; 1977–1978	
Isao Oshiro	Tsutomu Oshiro	1979–1980	
Masashi Ozawa	Killer Khan	1984	
Nicola Pacchiano	Nick Pacchiano	1966–1968; 1970–1976	
Michael Paidousis^{†}	Mike Paidousis	1958	
Chris Pallies^{†}	King Kong Bundy	1986 ^{WWF}	
Angel Pantoja	Angel Peron / José Peron	1980; 1982	
Henry Pardi^{†}	Tony Angelo	1950–1951; 1953–1955	
Cliff Parker	Cliff Parker	1957	
Robert Pare	Marquis de Paree / Mr. Guillotine	1959; 1964	
Reggie Parks^{†}	Reggie Parks / Reg Parks	1955–1962; 1969–1970; 1976–1977; 1982	
Stephen Patrebka	Steve Patrick	1954	
Jean Baptiste Paul^{†}	Chief Thunderbird	1948–1951; 1953	
George Pavich	George Pavich	1952	
Maurice Peak	Mighty Moe Malone	1986	
Ken Peale	Ken Wayne	1982	
Paul Pellerin	Butcher #2 / Paul Peller	1968; 1970–1971	
Fred Peloquin	Freddy Peloquin	1986	
George Pencheff	George Pencheff / George Penchoff	1958	
Michael Penzel^{†}	Colonel Kirchner	1987	
Miguel Pérez^{†}	Miguel Pérez	1978	
Paul Perschmann^{†}	Buddy Rose	1984	
Josip Peruzović^{†}	Big O / Joe Croatian / Joe Peruzovic	1968–1969	
Jack Pesek^{†}	Jack Pesek	1955; 1968–1969; 1972; 1974–1976	
David Peterson^{†}	DJ Peterson	1989	
Gene Petit^{†}	Cousin Luke / Gene Lewis	1979; 1986 ^{WWF}	
Stephen Petitpas	Steve Pettipas	1979	
John Pettigrew^{†}	Vern Pettigrew	1950	
Tommy Phelps	Tommy Phelps	1956	
Roberto Pico^{†}	Roberto Pico	1954; 1956; 1961	
Brian Pillman^{†}	Brian Pillman	1986–1989	
Michel Pigeon^{†}	Jos LeDuc	1968–1969	
Louis Pitoscia^{†}	Lou Pitoscia	1953–1954	
Karol Piwoworczyk^{†}	Karol Kalmikoff	1958; 1960–1961	
Danny Plechas^{†}	Danny Plechas	1950; 1958	
Louis Plummer^{†}	Lou Plummer	1955; 1957	
Angelo Poffo^{†}	Angelo Poffo	1954–1955	
Lanny Poffo	Lanny Poffo	1986 ^{WWF}	
Gilles Poisson	Alex the Butcher / Gilles Poisson	1969–1970; 1976	
Eric Pomeroy^{†}	Igor Kalmikoff	1964	
Ron Pope	The Magnificent Zulu / The Mighty Zulu	1973; 1978	
Garfield Portz	Garfield Portz	1980; 1987–1988	
Geoff Portz^{†}	Geoff Portz	1972–1973	
William Potts^{†}	Whipper Billy Watson	1949–1950; 1954; 1956–1963; 1965	
Freddie Prosser^{†}	Butcher #1 / Fred Sweetan	1968–1969	
Antonio Pugliese^{†}	Tony Parisi	1965	
Charles Putnam^{†}	Eric Pedersen	1952	
John Quinn^{†}	John Quinn	1971–1972; 1974–1977; 1984	
Harley Race^{†}	Harley Race	1977–1980; 1989	
Edward Ramírez^{†}	Charro Azteca	1956; 1959; 1963	
Robert Ramstead	Buck Ramstead	1983	
Robert Rancourt	Suni War Cloud	1988	
Austin Rapes^{†}	Buddy Austin	1970–1971	
Monroe Rice Jr.^{†}	Randy Tyler	1981	
Sylvester Ritter^{†}	Big Daddy Ritter	1978–1980	
Timothy Reid	Timothy Flowers	1983–1984; 1987	
Nick Roberts^{†}	Nick Roberts	1955	
Billy Robinson^{†}	Billy Robinson	1969–1970; 1972	
Ramon Eduardo Rodríguez^{†}	Ciclón Negro	1983	
Alex Romaniuk^{†}	Alex Romaniuk	1953	
Karl Rosenstein^{†}	Karl Gray	1951; 1956	
Victor Rosettani^{†}	Vic Rosettani / Vic Rossitani	1967–1968; 1973	
Jacques Rougeau	Jimmy Rougeau	1977–1978	
André Roussimoff^{†}	André the Giant	1976–1978; 1983–1984	
Martin Ruane^{†}	Loch Ness Monster	1980; 1983	
Dave Ruhl^{†}	Dave Ruhl	1948–1972	
Bob Russell	Bob Russell / Rebel Russell	1953	
Ronald Rychliski	Ron Ritchie	1985–1987; 1989–1990	
Gadowar Sahota	Gadabra Sahota / Gama Singh / The Great Gama	1973–1978; 1981–1989	
Hiroyuki Saito	Hiro Saito / Isao Saito	1983–1985	
Seiji Sakaguchi	Seiji Sakaguchi	1979	
Kazuo Sakurada^{†}	Kendo Nagasaki / Mr. Sakurada	1976–1981	
Bruno Sammartino^{†}	Bruno Sammartino	1965	
Charles Santen^{†}	Stan Dusek	1949–1950	
Kensuke Sasaki	Benkei Sasaki	1989	
Shinji Sasazaki	Yang Chung	1987–1988	
Peter Sauer^{†}	Ray Steele	1949	
Joseph Scarpa, Jr.^{†}	Mark Scarpa	1986–1987	
Herbert Schiff^{†}	Herb Freeman	1956	
Ray Schilling^{†}	Logger Larsen / Logger Larson	1956–1957	
Kenneth Schiscka^{†}	Ken Kenneth	1954–1956; 1959	
David Schultz	David Schults	1980–1984; 1986	
Steve Schumann^{†}	Lance Idol / The Rebel	1984; 1988	
Mark Sciarra	Rip Rogers	1988	
Mikel Scicluna^{†}	Michael Valentino	1957–1958; 1962–1964	
Angus Scott^{†}	Angus Scott / Sandy Scott	1954; 1956–1959; 1963–1964; 1978–1979	
George Scott^{†}	George Scott	1954; 1956–1964	
Tetsuo Sekigawa^{†}	Judo Joe / Mr. Sekigawa / Tetsuo Sekigawa	1973; 1979–1980	
Don Serrano^{†}	Don Serrano	1968–1969	
Ben Sharpe^{†}	Ben Sharpe	1962	
Mike Sharpe, Sr.^{†}	Mike Sharpe	1962–1963	
Mike Sharpe, Jr.^{†}	Mike Sharpe, Jr.	1976–1977; 1980–1981	
Charles Shaw^{†}	Ben Doon MacDonald	1987	
John Shaw	Ivan the Terrible	1957–1958	
Mike Shaw^{†}	Makhan Singh	1981–1984; 1985–1989	
Ron Shaw	Ron Shaw	1984 ^{WWF}	
Dan Sheffield^{†}	George Grant	1960	
David Sheldon^{†}	Angel of Death	1986–1987; 1989–1990	
Len Shelley	Len Shelly	1969; 1979	
Benjamin Sherman, Jr.^{†}	Ben Sherman	1953	
David Sherwin^{†}	Goldie Rogers	1980–1989	
Robert Shibuya^{†}	Kinji Shibuya	1953; 1958; 1962–1963	
Frank Shields^{†}	Bad Boy Shields / Boston Bruiser / Bruiser Shields / Frank Shields	1963–1965; 1968	
George Shindo^{†}	Sugi Hayamaka	1954	
Peter Shologan^{†}	Pete Shologan	1953–1955; 1958	
Larry Shreve	Abdullah the Butcher	1969–1974; 1984	
Walter Sieber^{†}	Waldo Von Erich	1961; 1963–1965; 1968	
Reginald Siki	Sweet Daddy Siki	1963–1964; 1966; 1970	
Tony Silipini^{†}	Tony Marino	1976	
Jagjit Singh Hans	Tiger Jeet Singh	1979	
Nanjo Singh^{†}	Nanjo Singh	1955	
Jhalman Singh Sidhu	Jalmin Singh / Sheer Jaguar Singh	1986	
Louis Sjoberg^{†}	Lou Sjoberg / Karl von Schober	1949–1951; 1953–1958; 1963–1964	
George Skaaland	George Skaaland	1986–1987	
Aurelian Smith, Jr.	Jake Roberts	1979	
Bert Smith^{†}	Stan Kowalski	1957; 1963	
Davey Boy Smith^{†}	Davey Boy Smith	1981–1984; 1985–1986 ^{WWF} 1988–1989	
Joe Smith Jr.^{†}	Don Kent	1971	
Roger Smith	The Assassin / Roger Rhodes	1976; 1989	
Smokey	Smokey the Wrestling Bear	1964	
Wilbur Snyder^{†}	Wilbur Snyder	1953; 1958	
Merced Solis	Tito Santana	1986 ^{WWF}	
Bill Soloweyko^{†}	Klondike Bill	1960–1961; 1964–1965; 1968–1969	
Laurent Soucie	Laurent Soucie	1982	
Edward Spulnik^{†}	Killer Kowalski	1961–1964	
Clem St. Louis	Clem St. Louis	1958–1960; 1962; 1965; 1967–1969	
Bill Stack	Bill Stack	1950	
Donald Stansauk^{†}	Hard Boiled Haggerty	1956–1957	
Tom Stanton	Elton Stanton / Tom Stanton / The Mercenary	1979–1982; 1984	
Clyde Steeves^{†}	Clyde Steeves	1961–1962	
Abe Stein^{†}	Abe Stein	1949	
Richard Steinborn^{†}	Dick Steinborn / Mr. Wrestling	1979–1980	
Carl Stevens^{†}	Ray Shire	1961	
Peter Stilsbury	Outback Jack	1986	
George Stipich^{†}	Emile Koverly / Stan Stasiak	1959–1960; 1964–1968	
Woody Strode^{†}	Woody Strode	1949; 1953	
Tinia Su'a	Alo Pago Pago	1960–1961	
Don Sugai^{†}	Don Sugai	1948; 1951	
Ed Sullivan^{†}	Ed Sullivan	1970–1972	
Phillip Swenson^{†}	The Swedish Angel	1949	
Nobuhiko Takada	Nobuhiko Takada	1983	
George Takano	The Cobra	1983–1985	
Shunji Takano	Shunji Takano	1983–1985	
Takao Tanaka	Ho Chi Lau	1982	
Joseph Tangaro^{†}	Joe Brunetti	1958; 1961	
Rick Taras	Rick Patterson	1985–1986	
Kenneth Tasker	Tiger Tasker	1958–1959	
Newton Tattrie^{†}	Alexander Newberry / Mr. Robust / Newton Tattrie / Pete Mingo	1964–1965; 1967–1969	
Papaliitele Taogaga	Duke Kono / Siva Afi	1979; 1982; 1986 ^{WWF}	
David Taylor	Tim Shea	1983	
Terrible Ted	Terrible Ted	1959; 1968	
Bill Terry^{†}	Kurt Von Hess	1971–1972; 1976	
Arthur Thomas^{†}	Art Thomas	1968	
James Thomas^{†}	Shag Thomas	1955; 1959; 1967	
Kieran Thomas	The Blue Demon / Dr. Drago Zhivago / Hutch Thomas	1984–1990	
Curtis Thompson	Archangel	1989	
Les Thornton^{†}	Les Thornton	1986	
Larry Tillman	Larry Tillman	1950	
Lajos Tiza^{†}	Lou Thesz	1952–1953; 1955; 1957–1959; 1961; 1963	
Masanori Toguchi	Tiger Chung Lee	1986 ^{WWF}	
Chris Tolos^{†}	Chris Tolos / George Tolos	1952; 1955; 1958; 1969	
John Tolos^{†}	John Tolos	1958; 1968	
Al Tomko^{†}	Cosmos #1 / Leroy Hirsch	1968; 1970	
William Toomey^{†}	Haystacks Muldoon	1961	
William Torontos^{†}	Billy Torontos / George Torontos	1962–1963	
Ted Tourtas	Ted Tourtas	1949	
Camille Tourville^{†}	Tarzan Tourville	1958–1961	
Bob Tuck	Cosmo #2	1968	
Frank Townsend	Farmer Boy	1957	
Maurice Vachon^{†}	Mad Dog Vachon	1959	
Paul Vachon	Butcher Vachon	1959–1960; 1962	
Gino Vagnone^{†}	Gino Vagnone / Mr. X	1951–1952	
Rico Valentino	Ricky Renaldo	1962	
Fernand Valois^{†}	Frank Valois	1974	
Charles Van Audenarde^{†}	Jack Terry	1963	
William Varga^{†}	Bill Vargas / Billy Varga	1964	
Hossein Vaziri	Khosrow Vaziri	1984	
Richard Vest^{†}	Chief Big Heart	1963	
Bernard Vignal	Bernard Vignal / Frenchy Vignal	1960	
Michel Vigneault^{†}	Michel Martel	1971–1974; 1976–1978	
Rick Vigneault	Rick Martel	1973–1974; 1977	
José Villalobos	Scorpion I	1977	
Raymond Villmer^{†}	Ray Villmer	1956	
Danny Viloski^{†}	Danny Viloski	1950–1953; 1968	
Michael Volcan^{†}	Mike Volcan	1959	
George Wagner^{†}	Gorgeous George	1949; 1956; 1959; 1961	
Rocky Wagner	Rocky Wagner	1952–1953	
John Walker^{†}	Johnny Walker	1961	
Chet Wallick^{†}	Chet Wallick	1956–1959	
Leo Wallick^{†}	Leo Wallick	1949	
Alan Warshawski	Al Warshawski	1955	
Winnett Watson^{†}	Pat Flanagan	1957	
Kenneth Weaver^{†}	Johnny Weaver	1961	
Édouard Weiczorkiewicz^{†}	Édouard Carpentier	1960–1961; 1968	
Larry Weil^{†}	Larry Sharpe	1976	
George Wells	George Wells	1978	
Arthur White^{†}	Tarzan White	1952	
C.M. Wilkins^{†}	Tex Wilkins	1949–1951	
David Williams	Dave Williams	1984	
John Wisniski^{†}	Johnny Valentine	1956–1957	
Jonathan Wisniski	Greg Valentine / Johnny Valentine, Jr.	1971–1972; 1986 ^{WWF}	
John Witte^{†}	John Witte	1957–1958	
Alexander Woodward	Alexander the Great / Great Alexander	1966	
Bernie Wright	Athol Foley	1983	
Bill Wright^{†}	Bill Wright	1962	
Edward Wright^{†}	Bearcat Wright	1953; 1956–1957; 1962–1963	
Frederick Wright^{†}	Fred Wright	1957	
James Wright^{†}	Jim Wright	1948; 1951; 1954–1956; 1958; 1960; 1962–1963	
Reuben Wright^{†}	Lu Kim / Rube Wright	1948–1949; 1958–1960	
Steve Wright	Steve Wright	1980	
Hiroshi Yagi	Hiroshi Yagi	1974–1976; 1979–1980	
Keiichi Yamada	Keiichi Yamada	1987; 1989	
Shin'ichi Yokouchi^{†}	Chati Yokouchi	1973	
Jay York^{†}	The Alaskan	1960–1961	
Abe Yourist^{†}	Abe Yourist	1948	
Pedro Zapata^{†}	Oki Shikina	1977	
Firpo Zbyszko^{†}	Firpo Zbyszko	1952–1953; 1955–1958; 1966–1968	
Aaron Zimbleman	Aaron Zimbleman	1950	
Stephan Zold	Steve Zold	1955	
Abe Zvonkin^{†}	Abe Zvonkin	1954–1955	

=== Female wrestlers ===
Birth name:	Ring name(s):	Tenure:	Notes
Unknown	Betty Ann Spencer	1963–1965	
Unknown	Betty Fredericks	1970	
Unknown	China Mira	1958	
Unknown	Connie Ethier	1953–1954	
Unknown	Darlene Shields	1962–1963	
Unknown	Delta Dawn	1987	
Unknown	Desiree Petersen	1985; 1989–1990	
Unknown	Dolly Dropko	1964	
Unknown	Donna Day	1981	
Unknown	Doris Omoth	1975	
Unknown	Doris Sawback	1964	
Unknown	Edith Wade	1955	
Unknown	Elaine Ellis	1956	
Unknown	Elma Cook	1963	
Unknown	Evita Alonzo	1988	
Unknown	Jackie Hammond	1958–1960; 1962	
Unknown	Jan Chase	1968–1969	
Unknown	Jane O'Brien	1970	
Unknown^{†}	Jean Antone	1971–1973	
Unknown	Joyce Ford	1953–1954	
Unknown	Joyce Smith	1958–1959	
Unknown	Kathy O'Brien	1962	
Unknown	Kathy Starr	1959–1962	
Unknown	Lilly Bitter	1953	
Unknown	Lois Johnson	1956	
Unknown	Lucy Martin	1959	
Unknown	Madge Robinson	1963	
Unknown	Marie Vagnone	1970	
Unknown	Mary Alice Hillis	1956	
Unknown^{†}	Marva Scott	1959	
Unknown	Mika Komatsu	1987–1988	
Unknown	Millie Stafford	1951–1953; 1955–1956; 1959; 1961	
Unknown	Olga Martinez	1963	
Unknown	Olga Zepeda	1954–1956	
Unknown	Patty Stevens	1970	
Unknown	Peggy Allen	1960	
Unknown	Penny Mitchell	1982–1983	
Unknown	Princess White Rabbit	1962	
Unknown	Rita Rivera	1983; 1989	
Unknown	Ruth Boatcallie	1954–1955	
Unknown	Sandra Partlowe	1973	
Unknown	Susie Mantis	1986	
Unknown	Terri LaChance / Terry LaChance	1968; 1975	
Unknown	Toni Rose	1964; 1973–1974	
Unknown	Vicky Carranza / Vicki Hernández	1986	
Unknown	Violet Viann	1953–1954	
Unknown	Vivian Oneski	1958	
Unknown	Yumi Ogura	1988	
Ethel Aschenbrenner	Ethel Brown	1954–1955	
Barbara Baker	Barbara Baker	1954–1957	
Joan Ballard	Jessica Rogers	1960	
Winona Barkley^{†}	Winona Little Heart	1980	
Nellya Baughman^{†}	Judy Grable	1959; 1963–1964; 1969; 1982	
Dinah Beamon	Diana Beamon / Dinah Beamon	1963	
Barbara Boucher	Bette Boucher	1964	
Kathy Branch	Cathy Branch / Kathy Branch	1955	
Bonnabel Burnquist^{†}	Bonnie Watson	1953–1956	
Etta Mae Cantrell^{†}	Lana Lamar	1955	
Carol Carota	Carol Carota	1952–1953	
Dorothy Carter	Dorothy Carter	1964	
Lucille Ann Casey^{†}	Ann Casey	1963	
Mahala Coker	Judy Glover	1954; 1958; 1961	
Carol Cook	Carol Cook	1950; 1954	
Dorothy Dotson	Dot Dotson	1959; 1962	
Mary Ellison^{†}	The Fabulous Moolah	1959–1960; 1964	
Elizabeth J. Floyd^{†}	Betty Hawkins / Betty Jo Hawkins	1954–1957	
Mars Foreit^{†}	Mars Bennett	1951; 1956	
Irene Francisco^{†}	Princess White Dove	1963–1964	
Lori Froese	Tiger Lady	1983	
María Dolores González	Lola González	1988	
Marva Goodwin^{†}	Babs Wingo	1957; 1959	
Yolanda Gutierrez^{†}	Rita Cortez	1960	
Ethel Hairston^{†}	Ethel Johnson	1957; 1959	
Judy Hardee	Judy Martin	1980; 1982	
Geneva Huckabee^{†}	The Lady Angel	1960	
Hiroe Ito	Taranchera	1984	
Lorraine Johnson^{†}	Lorraine Johnson	1958–1961	
Dixie Jordan	Princess Little Cloud	1964	
Mary Ann Kostecki^{†}	Penny Banner	1956–1958; 1961	
Mary LaFramboise	Princess Brighteyes	1971	
Sylvia Lantagne^{†}	Betty Clark	1959	
LaChona LeClaire	LeeChona LaClaire	1955	
Peggy Lee	Peggy Lee	1980	
María León	Rossy Moreno	1984	
Laura Martin	Laura Martinez	1954; 1958; 1960	
Susie Mae McCoy^{†}	Sweet Georgia Brown	1963–1965	
Velvet McIntyre	Velvet McIntyre	1982–1983 ^{WWF}	
Mary Jane Mull^{†}	Mary Jane Mull	1953–1954	
Chigusa Nagayo	Chigusa Nagayo	1988	
Maria Nelson	Marie LaVerne	1971	
Betty Jo Niccoli	Betty Niccoli	1971–1975	
Mary Noble^{†}	Kay Noble	1958–1959; 1961	
Alma Osbak	Alma Mills	1957–1958	
Vickie Otis^{†}	Princess Victoria	1982	
Patricia Penry	Pattie Neff / Patty Neff	1955–1956	
Anna Pico	Ann LaVerne	1951; 1954	
Barbara Reeves	Barbara Galento	1971–1972	
Wendi Richter	Wendi Richter	1982–1983 ^{WWF}	
Elsie Schevchenko^{†}	Ella Waldek	1951–1952	
Brenda Scott	Brenda Scott	1963	
Ida Mae Selenkow^{†}	Ida Mae Martinez	1953–1955	
DeAlva Sibly^{†}	June Byers	1953; 1955–1958; 1961–1962	
Rhonda Sing^{†}	Monster Ripper / Rhonda Singh	1983–1989	
Gloria Souza^{†}	Gloria Barattini	1959	
Verdie Nell Stewart^{†}	Nell Stewart	1950; 1953; 1955	
Kathy Stockton	KC Houston	1987; 1989–1990	
Margarita Strong^{†}	Maria Garcia	1963	
Cora Svonsteckik^{†}	Cora Combs	1953	
Debbie Szostecki	Debbie Combs	1981	
Betty Wade-Murphy	Joyce Grable	1974; 1980; 1982–1983	
Mercedes Waukago	Princess Tona Tomah	1960; 1962	
Doris Whitlock	Sabrina	1982	
Kathleen Wimbley	Kathleen Wimbley	1954	
Masami Yoshida	Devil Masami	1987	
Johnnie Mae Young^{†}	Mae Young	1959	

=== Midget wrestlers ===
Birth name:	Ring name(s):	Tenure:	Notes
Unknown	Baby Cheryl	1960; 1964	
Unknown	Bobo Johnson	1976	
Unknown	Bouncing Burke / Bouncing Bernie Burke	1960	
Unknown	Chico Santana	1963	
Unknown	Dandy Andy Moore / Dandy Moore	1960–1961	
Unknown	Dirty Morgan	1979	
Unknown	Farmer McGregor	1959	
Unknown	The Frisco Kid	1983	
Unknown	Hillbilly Pete	1977	
Unknown	The Jamaica Kid	1966; 1969–1971	
Unknown	Joey Russell	1981	
Unknown	Johnny Smith	1951	
Unknown	Little Red Feather / Red Feather	1957–1960	
Unknown	Mario Sanchez / Mario Valentine / Mario Valentino	1959	
Unknown	Max Bowman / Otto Bowman	1954–1955	
Unknown	Pee Wee Lopez	1963	
Unknown	Sonny Boy Cassidy	1962	
Unknown	Sonny Boy Hayes	1970–1973; 1976; 1982	
Unknown	Tiger Jackson	1953	
Unknown	Tito Infante	1955	
Unknown	Wee Willie Wilson	1977	
Unknown	Wolfman Kevin	1983–1984	
Jonathan Adams^{†}	Little John	1975; 1977–1978	
Shigeri Akabane^{†}	Little Tokyo	1978; 1980	
William Bowman^{†}	Tom Thumb	1951; 1955–1961; 1969; 1973	
Robert Bradley^{†}	Cowboy Bradley	1955; 1958; 1961; 1968–1971	
Roger Butts	Brown Panther	1955–1960	
Garry Culbreth	Tiny Tom	1979–1980	
John P. Cusic^{†}	Irish Jackie	1955–1960; 1962; 1964; 1967	
Curtis Dudit	Coconut Willie	1979–1980; 1983–1984; 1988	
Steve Eisenhower	Butch Cassidy	1979	
Marcel Gauthier^{†}	Sky Low Low	1951; 1953–1955; 1957; 1960–1961; 1963–1964; 1966; 1969–1970; 1981–1982; 1988	
Jean Jacques Girard^{†}	Little Brutus / Tiny Tim Girard	1955–1959; 1961; 1963–1964; 1966–1967; 1969–1972	
Claude Giroux	Tiger Jackson	1982	
Lionel Giroux^{†}	Little Beaver	1951; 1958–1961; 1963; 1966; 1969; 1982	
Katie Glass	Diamond Lil	1974	
William Guillot^{†}	Billy the Kid	1959–1963; 1969–1970; 1973; 1975; 1977–1980	
James Houghton^{†}	Beau Brummel	1959; 1961	
Raymond Kessler	The Haiti Kid	1972; 1975–1978	
Harold Lang^{†}	Cowboy Lang	1971; 1973; 1975; 1978–1980; 1988	
Raymond McCrae	Tuffy McCrae	1954	
Sylvia McMillian	Darling Dagmar	1960; 1964; 1974	
Jean Roy	Pancho López / Tiny Roe	1951; 1958; 1960–1962	
Raymond Sabourin^{†}	Pee Wee James	1951; 1953–1955; 1957; 1959–1960	
Leon Stap^{†}	Fuzzy Cupid	1957–1958; 1960; 1962; 1964; 1968	
Richard Stephenson^{†}	Mighty Schultz	1953–1955; 1959	
Roger Tomlin^{†}	Little Boy Blue	1963; 1973	
Eric Tovey^{†}	Lord Littlebrook	1956–1958; 1961	
Ferdinand Tucci^{†}	Pancho the Bull	1951; 1953–1955; 1959–1960	
Pierre Villeneuve^{†}	Farmer Pete	1959; 1961; 1973	

=== Stables and tag teams ===
Tag team/Stable(s)	Members	Tenure(s)
Bad Company	Bruce Hart and Brian Pillman^{†}	1986–1988
The Blackhearts	Apocalypse and Destruction	1989
The British Bulldogs^{†}	The Dynamite Kid and Davey Boy Smith	1983–1984; 1988
The Brunettis^{†}	Guy Brunetti and Joe Brunetti	1958; 1961
The Burkes	Leo Burke and Bobby Burke^{†}	1977–1981
The Butchers	Butcher#1^{†} and Butcher #2	1968
The Calgary Hurricanes	Hiro Saito, Shunji Takano and Strong Machine	1983–1984
The Castillo Brothers	Fidel Castillo and Raoul Castillo	1978
Chin Lee & Sugi Sito	Chin Lee and Sugi Sito	1971–1972
The Christys	Bobby Christy and Jerry Christy	1964; 1967–1970
The Cosmos	Cosmo#1 and Cosmo #2	1968
The Cuban Assassins	Cuban Assassin#1 and Cuban Assassin #2	1976–1977
The Cuban Commandos	The Cuban Assassin and Gerry Morrow	1987–1989
The Derringer Brothers	Bret Derringer and Matt Derringer	1989
The Des Fosses Brothers	Gilles Des Fosses and Jacques Des Fosses	1987–1988
The Fabulous Kangaroos	Al Costello^{†} and Roy Heffernan^{†}	1957; 1964–1965
The Flying Scotts^{†}	George Scott and Sandy Scott	1954; 1956–1959; 1963
Goldie Rogers & Rip Rogers	Goldie Rogers^{†} and Rip Rogers	1988
The Kalmikoffs^{†}	Ivan Kalmikoff and Karol Kalmikoff	1958; 1960
Karachi Vice	The Great Gama, Makhan Singh^{†}, and Vokhan Singh^{†}	1986–1989
The Kelly Twins	Pat Kelly^{†} and Mike Kelly	1974–1975
The Kiwis	Sweet William and Nick Carter	1974; 1979
The LeDucs	Paul LeDuc and Jos LeDuc^{†}	1968–1969
The McGuire Twins^{†}	Benny McGuire and Billy McGuire	1976
The Masters of Disaster	Duke Myers^{†} and Kerry Brown^{†}	1987
The Mechanics	Mechanic #1 and Mechanic #2	1985–1986
Michel Martel & Danny Babich	Michel Martel^{†} and Danny Babich	1971–1973
Mitsu Arakawa & Kinji Shibuya	Mitsu Arakawa^{†} and Kinji Shibuya^{†}	1958
The Morrow Brothers	Ed and Gerry Morrow	1975–1976
Mr. Hito & Mr. Sakurada	Mr. Hito^{†} and Mr. Sakurada^{†}	1978–1979
Murder Inc.^{†}	Al Mills and Tiny Mills	1951–1955; 1957–1958
The Neilson Brothers^{†}	Art Neilson and Stan Neilson	1963
The Osborne Brothers	Bud Osborne and Ray Osborne	1960–1962; 1968–1969; 1977–1978
The Outlaws	Outlaw #1 and Outlaw #2	1979
The Peron Brothers	Chicky Peron and Jose Peron	1980
The Power Twins	David Power and Larry Power	1989
The Royal Kangaroos^{†}	Lord Jonathan Boyd and Norman Frederick Charles III	1977
The Samurai Warriors	Benkei Sasaki and Sumu Hara	1989
The Scorpions	Scorpion I and Scorpion II	1977
The State Patrol	Sgt. Buddy Lee Parker and Lt. James Earl Wright	1989
The Sweetan Brothers^{†}	Bob Sweetan and Fred Sweetan	1969
The Tolos Brothers^{†}	Chris Tolos and John Tolos	1958
The Torres Brothers^{†}	Alberto Torres and Ramon Torres	1961
The Vachons	Butcher Vachon and Mad Dog Vachon^{†}	1959
The Viet Cong Express	Hiroshi Hase and Fumihiro Niikura	1986–1987
The Von Steigers	Kurt Von Steiger and Karl Von Steiger	1967
The Wild Samoans	Afa Anoaʻi and Sika Anoaʻi	1973; 1984 ^{WWF}

=== Managers and valets ===
Birth name:	Ring name(s):	Tenure:	Notes
Milad Elzein	Abu Wizal	1987–1989	
John Foley^{†}	J.R. Foley	1976–1986	
Gertrude Vachon^{†}	Luna Vachon	1989	
Ichimasa Wakamatsu	K.Y. Wakamatsu	1982–1984; 1989	

=== Commentators and interviewers ===
Birth name:	Ring name(s):	Tenure:	Notes
Jim Davies	Jim Davies	1985–1989	
Bob Leonard	Bob Leonard	1957–1989	
Ed Whalen^{†}	Ed Whalen	1958–1983; 1985–1989	

=== Referees ===
Birth name:	Ring name(s):	Tenure:	Notes
Sandy Scott	Alexander Scott		
Unknown	Cedric Hathaway		
Unknown	Rod Hayter		
Wayne Hart	Wayne Hart		
Dean Hart^{†}	Dean Hart		
Hans-Jochen Herrmann	Hans-Jochen Herrmann / Jergin Himmler	1979–1989	
Lajos Tiza^{†}	Lou Thesz	1981	

Company name to Year
Company name:	Years:
Klondike Wrestling	1948–1951
Big Time Wrestling	1951–1964
Wildcat Wrestling	1965–1967
Stampede Wrestling	1967–1990
Notes
^{†} Indicates they are deceased.
^{‡} Indicates they died while they were employed with Stampede Wrestling.
^{WWF} Indicates they were part of a talent exchange with the World Wrestling Federation.
