= NWA International Tag Team Championship =

Professional wrestling tag team championship

Details
- Promotion: Japan Wrestling Association (1966-1973); Western States Sports (1973-1975); All Japan Pro Wrestling (1975-1988); Western States Sports
- Date established: 1959
- Date retired: June 10, 1988
Statistics
- First champions: The Fabulous Kangaroos (Al Costello and Roy Heffernan)
- Final champions: Jumbo Tsuruta and Yoshiaki Yatsu
- Most reigns: Team: Giant Baba and Jumbo Tsuruta (6 reigns); Individual: Giant Baba (12 reigns)
- Shortest reign: "Killer" Karl Krupp and Fritz Von Erich, Jumbo Tsuruta and Yoshiaki Yatsu (<1 day)

This was a regional NWA championship based in Japan. For the version of this title that was promoted in NWA All Star Wrestling in Canada, see NWA International Tag Team Championship (Vancouver version).

The NWA International Tag Team Championship was a National Wrestling Alliance-sanctioned title contested in All Japan Pro Wrestling (AJPW) and Western States Sports. Prior to being used in AJPW, the title was defended in the Japan Wrestling Association (JWA). The title lasted from 1962 through 1988. It is now part of the World Tag Team Championship, also known as the "Double Cup".

== Title history ==
Key
No.	The overall championship reign
Reign	The reign number for the specific wrestler listed.
Event	The event promoted by the respective promotion in which the title changed hands
N/A	The specific information is not known
—	Used for vacated reigns in order to not count it as an official reign

No.	Champions	Reign	Date	Days held	Location	Event	Notes	Ref(s)
Japan Wrestling Association (JWA)
1	The Fabulous Kangaroos (Al Costello and Roy Heffernan)	1	1962	(Note: The length of the championship reign is too uncertain to calculate.)	N/A	N/A	Recognized as first champions; may have held the title as early as 1959.	
2	The Flying Scotts (George Scott and Sandy Scott)	1	January 1963		N/A	Live event		
3	Karl and Kurt Von Stroheim	1	July 1964	(Note: The exact date the championship was won and lost is uncertain, which means that the championship reign lasted between 1 day and 19 days.)	Texas	Live event		
4	Bull and Fred Curry	1	July 20, 1964	(Note: The exact date the championship was won and lost is uncertain, which means that the championship reign lasted between 1 day and 72 days.)	Fort Worth, Texas	Live event		
5	Karl and Kurt Von Stroheim	2	February 1966	(Note: The exact date the championship was won and lost is uncertain, which means that the championship reign lasted between 1 day and 71 days.)	Texas, United States	Live event		
6	Fritz Von Goehring and Mike Padosis	1	September 1966	(Note: The exact date the championship was won is uncertain, which means that the championship reign lasted between 766 days and 795 days.)	Texas, United States	Live event		
7	Giant Baba and Michiaki Yoshimura	1	November 5, 1966	335	Tokyo, Japan	Live event	Established the title in Japan Pro Wrestling Alliance.	
8	Tarzan Tyler and Bill Watts	1	October 6, 1967	25	Fukushima, Japan	Live event		
9	Giant Baba (2) and Antonio Inoki	1	October 31, 1967	69	Osaka, Japan	Live event		
—	Vacated	—	January 8, 1968	—	N/A	N/A	Title held up when Inoki no-shows a scheduled defense against Crusher Lisowski and Dr. Bill Miller in Hiroshima, Japan due to heavy snow.	
10	Giant Baba (3) and Antonio Inoki	2	February 3, 1968	341	Tokyo, Japan	Live event	Defeated Crusher Lisowski and Bill Miller in rematch to win the held up title.	
11	Danny Hodge and Wilbur Snyder	1	January 9, 1969	26	Hiroshima, Japan	Live event		
12	Giant Baba (4) and Antonio Inoki	3	February 4, 1969	188	Sapporo, Japan	Live event		
13	Dick the Bruiser and Crusher Lisowski	1	August 11, 1969	2	Sapporo, Japan	Live event		
14	Giant Baba (5) and Antonio Inoki	4	August 13, 1969	846	Osaka, Japan	Live event		
15	The Funks (Dory Funk, Jr. and Terry Funk)	1	December 7, 1971	164	Los Angeles, California	Live event		
16	Giant Baba (6) and Seiji Sakaguchi	1	May 19, 1972	111	Los Angeles, California, United States	Live event		
—	Vacated	—	September 7, 1972	—	N/A	N/A	Baba left the JWA to found All Japan Pro Wrestling.	
17	Kintarō Ōki and Seiji Sakaguchi (2)	1	December 2, 1972	82	Tokyo, Japan	Live event	Defeated Bobo Brazil and Gene Kiniski to win the vacant title.	
18	Killer Karl Krupp and Johnny Valentine	1	February 22, 1973	12	Osaka, Japan	Live event		
19	Kintarō Ōki (2) and Umanosuke Ueda	1	March 6, 1973	43	Nagoya, Japan	Live event		
20	Killer Karl Krupp (2) and Fritz Von Erich	1	April 18, 1973	(Note: The exact date the championship was won is uncertain, which means that the championship reign lasted between 1 day and 12 days.)	Yaizu, Japan	Live event		
21	Killer Karl Krupp (3) and Karl Von Steiger	1	April 1973	(Note: The exact date the championship was won and lost is uncertain, which means that the championship reign lasted between 1 day and 11 days.)	N/A	N/A	The JWA closed on April 20, 1973. Von Erich forfeited his half of the title and Krupp chose Karl von Steiger as his new partner to defend the title in Western States Sports.	
Western States Sports (WSS)
22	The Funks (Dory Funk Jr. and Terry Funk)	2	May 26, 1973	92	Amarillo, Texas	Live event		
23	Killer Karl Kox and Ciclon Negro	1	August 26, 1973	(Note: The exact date the championship was lost is uncertain, which means that the championship reign lasted between 36 days and 66 days.)	Lubbock, Texas	Live event		
24	The Funks (Dory Funk Jr. and Terry Funk)	3	October 1973	(Note: The exact date the championship was won is uncertain, which means that the championship reign lasted between 462 days and 492 days.)	Texas	Live event		
All Japan Pro Wrestling (AJPW)
25	Giant Baba (7) and Jumbo Tsuruta	1	February 5, 1975	631	San Antonio, Texas	Live event	Returned to All Japan Pro Wrestling with the championship	
26	Kintarō Ōki (3) and Kim Duk	1	October 28, 1976	42	Tokyo, Japan	Live event		
27	Giant Baba (8) and Jumbo Tsuruta	2	December 9, 1976	333	Tokyo, Japan	Live event		
28	Kintarō Ōki (4) and Kim Duk	2	November 7, 1977	185	Seoul, South Korea	Live event		
29	Giant Baba (9) and Jumbo Tsuruta	3	May 11, 1978	519	Tokyo, Japan	Live event		
30	Abdullah the Butcher and Ray Candy	1	October 12, 1979	7	Tokyo, Japan	Live event		
31	Giant Baba (10) and Jumbo Tsuruta	4	October 19, 1979	1,271	Tokyo, Japan	Live event		
32	Ron Bass and Stan Hansen	1	April 12, 1983	5	Matsuyama, Japan	Live event		
33	Giant Baba (11) and Jumbo Tsuruta	5	April 17, 1983	100	Nagasaki, Japan	Live event		
34	Tiger Jeet Singh and Umanosuke Ueda (2)	1	July 26, 1983	6	Fukuoka, Japan	Live event		
35	Giant Baba (12) and Jumbo Tsuruta	6	August 1, 1983	(Note: The exact date the championship was lost is uncertain, which means that the championship reign lasted between 274 and 304 days.)	Tokyo, Japan	Live event		
—	Vacated	—	May 1984	—	N/A	N/A	Baba was injured	
36	Genichiro Tenryu and Jumbo Tsuruta (7)	1	September 3, 1984	520	Hiroshima, Japan	Live event	Defeated Jerry Blackwell and Bruiser Brody to win the vacant title.	
37	Riki Choshu and Yoshiaki Yatsu	1	February 5, 1986	365	Sapporo, Japan	Live event		
38	Genichiro Tenryu (2) and Jumbo Tsuruta (8)	2	February 5, 1987	35	Sapporo, Japan	Live event		
39	The Road Warriors (Animal and Hawk)	1	March 12, 1987	456	Tokyo, Japan	Live event		
Western States Sports (WSS)
40	Jumbo Tsuruta (9) and Yoshiaki Yatsu (2)	1	June 10, 1988	0	Tokyo, Japan	Live event		
—	Unified	—	June 10, 1988	—	N/A	N/A	Unified with the PWF Tag Team Championship to form the World Tag Team Championship, also known as the "Double Cup".	

== List of combined reigns ==
=== By Team ===
Rank	Team	# Of Reigns	Combined Days
1	Giant Baba and Jumbo Tsuruta	6	3,127
2	Giant Baba and Antonio Inoki	4	1,444
3	Dory Funk Jr. and Terry Funk	3	749
4	Genichiro Tenryu and Jumbo Tsuruta	2	555
5	Flying Scotts (George Scott and Sandy Scott	1	547
6	Bull Curry and Fred Curry	1	529
7	The Road Warriors (Animal and Hawk)	1	456
8	The Fabulous Kangoroos (Al Costello and Roy Heffernan)	1	365
8	Riki Choshu and Yoshiaki Yatsu	1	365
9	Giant Baba and Michiaki Yoshimura	1	335
10	Karl and Kurt Von Stroheim	2	263
11	Kintarō Ōki and Kim Duk	2	227
12	Giant Baba and Seiji Sakaguchi	1	111
13	Kintarō Ōki and Seiji Sakaguchi	1	82
14	Fritz Von Goehring and Mike Padosis	1	66
15	Kintarō Ōki and Umanosuke Ueda	1	43
16	Tarzan Tyler and Bill Watts	1	25
17	Danny Hodge and Wilbur Snyder	1	26
17	"Killer" Karl Krupp and Johnny Valentine	1	12
17	"Killer" Karl Krupp and Karl Von Steiger	1	12
19	Abdullah the Butcher and Ray Candy	1	7
20	Tiger Jeet Singh and Umanosuke Ueda	1	6
21	"Killer" Karl Kox and Ciclon Negro	1	5
21	Ron Bass and Stan Hansen	1	5
23	Dick the Bruiser and Crusher Lisowski	1	2
24	"Killer" Karl Krupp and Fritz Von Erich	1	0
24	Jumbo Tsuruta and Yoshiaki Yatsu	1	0

=== By wrestler ===
Rank	Team	# Of Reigns	Combined Days
1	Giant Baba	12	5,017
2	Jumbo Tsuruta	9	3,662
3	Antonio Inoki	4	1,444
4	Dory Funk Jr	3	749
4	Terry Funk	3	749
5	Genichiro Tenryu	2	555
6	George Scott	1	547
6	Sandy Scott	1	547
7	Bull Curry	1	529
7	Fred Curry	1	529
8	Animal	1	456
8	Hawk	1	456
9	Al Costello	1	365
9	Roy Heffernan	1	365
9	Riki Choshu	1	365
9	Yoshiaki Yatsu	2	365
10	Kintarō Ōki	4	352
11	Michiaki Yoshimura	1	335
12	Karl Von Stroheim	2	263
12	Kurt Von Stroheim	2	263
13	Kim Duk	2	227
14	Seiji Sakaguchi	2	193
15	Fritz Von Goehring	1	66
15	Mike Padosis	1	66
16	Umanosuke Ueda	2	49
17	Danny Hodge	1	26
17	Wilbur Snyder	1	26
18	Tarzan Tyler	1	25
18	Bill Watts	1	25
19	"Killer" Karl Krupp	3	23
20	Johnny Valentine	1	12
21	Abdullah the Butcher	1	7
21	Ray Candy	1	7
22	Tiger Jeet Singh	1	6
23	"Killer" Karl Kox	1	5
23	Ciclon Negro	1	5
23	Ron Bass	1	5
23	Stan Hansen	1	5
24	Dick the Bruiser	1	2
24	Crusher Lisowski	1	2
25	Fritz Von Erich	1	0

== See also ==
- List of National Wrestling Alliance championships
- Japan Wrestling Association
- World Tag Team Championship
- NWA International Heavyweight Championship
