= John Foti =

Canadian wrestler (1928–1969)

Personal information
- Born: John Fotie; March 13, 1928 Regina, Saskatchewan
- Died: April 29, 1969 (aged 41) Calgary, Alberta

Professional wrestling career
- Ring name(s): John Foti; Bobby Bell
- Billed weight: 100 kg (220 lb)
- Billed from: Buffalo, New York; Hamilton, Ontario
- Debut: 1954

John Fotie (March 13, 1928 – April 29, 1969) was a Canadian professional wrestler and a painter, better known by his ring name, John Foti. He was best known in Stu Hart's Stampede Wrestling in Calgary from 1955 to 1969. He also wrestled in the American Wrestling Association and National Wrestling Alliance.

== Professional wrestling career ==
=== Early career ===
Born in Regina, Saskatchewan and alter raised in Hamilton, Ontario. He worked in the gym where he befriended George Scott, Sandy Scott, Skull Murphy and Billy Red Lyons. Got into wrestling he started his career in upstate New York and Ontario. In 1957 he wrestled for the American Wrestling Association in Minnesota.

=== Stampede Wrestling ===
In 1955 Foti debuted in Stu Hart's Stampede Wrestling in Calgary, Alberta where he became a household name for the territory. Billed from Hamilton, Foti would draw sellouts crowds in matches against Whipper Billy Watson, Lou Thesz, and Killer Kowalski. On June 6, 1959, Foti won the NWA Calgary Canadian Heavyweight Title by defeating Charro Azteca. He feuded with Mad Dog Vachon, and Vachon's brother Paul. The title was vacated in July of that year. In 1960 he won the Stampede International Tag Team titles with Don Kindred and dropped the titles to Luther Lindsay and Oattman Fisher. Foti once again won the NWA Calgary Canadian Heavyweight Title as he defeated John Smith on June 9, 1961, and lost the title to Killer Kowalski on November 17. In 1963 he left Calgary to wrestle for other territories in Canada and the United States.

In 1966 he returned to Stampede where he feuded with Gil Hayes from 1967 to 1969, and Bob Sweetan in 1969.

=== Later career ===
Foti spent time in Buffalo's National Wrestling Federation, Vancouver's All-Star Wrestling, and Portland's Pacific Northwest Wrestling. Between 1963 and 1966 he wrestled in Toronto's Maple Leaf Wrestling. In 1964 he wrestled in the Northeast territory for World Wide Wrestling Federation as a journeyman.

== Personal life and death ==
He was also a painter. He struggled with alcoholism in his later years. On April 29, 1969, Foti committed suicide in his home in Calgary. He was 41.

== Championships and accomplishments ==
- Stampede Wrestling
  - Stampede Wrestling International Tag Team Championship – with Don Kindred
  - NWA Canadian Heavyweight Championship (Calgary version) (2 times)
  - NWA Alberta Tag Team Championship – with John Paul Hennig

== See also ==
- List of premature professional wrestling deaths
