= Alberta Tag Team Championship =

1950s tag team championship

Details
- Promotion: Stampede Wrestling
- Date established: March 5, 1954
- Date retired: c.1957
Statistics
- First champions: Bob Mike and Seelie Samara
- Final champions: John Foti and John Paul Henning
- Most reigns: The Flying Scotts (George Scott and Sandy Scott) (3 times)
- Longest reign: The Flying Scotts (211 days)
- Shortest reign: Bob Mike and Seelie Samara (5 days)

In professional wrestling, the Alberta Tag Team Championship was a tag team championship promoted by the Calgary, Alberta, Canada-based professional wrestling promotion Stampede Wrestling in the mid-1950s.

== History ==
The Alberta Tag Team Championship was created in 1954. The inaugural champions were Bob Mike and Seelie Samara, who defeated Jim Henry and Frank Marconi on 5 March 1954 in what was billed as the final bout of a tournament.

The Alberta Tag Team Championship was one of two tag team championships contested in Stampede Wrestling during the mid-1950s, with the other being the NWA Canadian Tag Team Championship (which was also created in 1954). On several occasions, the same tag team held the two championships concurrently.

The championship was defended exclusively within Calgary, with bouts taking place in the Victoria Pavilion. The championship was frequently defended in two-out-of-three falls matches.

There are two gaps in the recorded lineage of the Alberta Tag Team Championship: from 2 August 1954 to March 1955, and again between 27 May 1955 and 5 April 1956. It is unknown whether the championship continued to be defended and change hands over these periods without a record being maintained or rather whether it was quietly abandoned and subsequently resurrected.

The final champions were John Foti and John Paul Henning, who won the championship on 14 December 1956, and were billed as champions until at least 30 May 1957. The championship was abandoned that year. In February 1958, the NWA International Tag Team Championship was introduced in its place.

== Reigns ==
Key
No.	Overall reign number
Reign	Reign number for the specific champion
Days	Number of days held
<1	Reign lasted less than a day
+	Current reign is changing daily

No.	Champion	Championship change			Reign statistics		Notes	Ref.
No.	Champion	Date	Event	Location	Reign	Days	Notes	Ref.
1	Bob Mike and Seelie Samara	March 5, 1954	House show	Calgary, Alberta, Canada	1	5	Mike and Samara defeated Jim Henry and Frank Marconi in the final of a tournament.	
2	Jim Henry and Frank Marconi	March 10, 1954	House show	Calgary, Alberta, Canada	1	44		
3	Jean Baillargeon and Seelie Samara (2)	April 23, 1954	House show	Calgary, Alberta, Canada	1	14		
4	Jim Henry (2) and Mr. E	May 7, 1954	House show	Calgary, Alberta, Canada	1	55	During the reign the masked Mr. E revealed his identity as Abe Zvonkin.	
5	The Flying Scotts (George Scott and Sandy Scott)	July 1, 1954	House show	Calgary, Alberta, Canada	1	15		
6	Chico Garcia and Roberto Pico	March 5, 1954	House show	Calgary, Alberta, Canada	1	7		
7	The Flying Scotts (George Scott and Sandy Scott)	July 23, 1954	House show	Calgary, Alberta, Canada	2	≥10	The date and manner of the end of the reign is not recorded. The Flying Scotts held the championship until at least 2 August 1954.	
8	Steve Gob and Ivan Kameroff	Unknown	Unknown	Unknown	1	≥20	The date and manner of the beginning of the reign is not recorded. Steve Gob and Ivan Kameroff held the championship from at least 2 March 1955.	
9	Lou Sjoberg and Fritz Von Erich	March 25, 1955	House show	Calgary, Alberta, Canada	1	11		
10	Sky Hi Lee and Earl McCready	April 5, 1955	House show	Calgary, Alberta, Canada	1	34		
11	Lou Sjoberg and Fritz Von Erich	May 6, 1954	House show	Calgary, Alberta, Canada	2	14		
12	Don Lee and Sky Hi Lee (2)	May 20, 1955	House show	Calgary, Alberta, Canada	1	≥7	The date and manner of the end of the reign is not recorded. Don Lee and Sky Hi Lee held the championship until at least 27 May 1955.	
13	Roberto Pico (2) and Jim Wright	Unknown	Unknown	Unknown	1	≥8	The date and manner of the beginning of the reign is not recorded. Robert Pico and Jim Wright held the championship from at least 5 April 1956.	
14	The Flying Scotts (George Scott and Sandy Scott)	April 13, 1956	House show	Calgary, Alberta, Canada	3	211		
15	Charro Azteca and Fritz Von Ulm	November 10, 1956	House show	Calgary, Alberta, Canada	1	34		
16	John Foti and John Paul Henning	December 10, 1956	House show	Calgary, Alberta, Canada	1	≥167	The date and manner of the end of the reign is not recorded. John Foti and John Paul Henning held the championship until at least May 30, 1957.	
