= Les Bricoleurs =

Les bricoleurs
- Directed by: Jean Girault
- Written by: Jean Girault; Jacques Vilfrid
- Produced by: Raymond Eger
- Starring: Francis Blance; Darry Crowl; Elke Sommer
- Music by: Michel Magne
- Production company: Félix Films
- Distributed by: Les Films Fernand Rivers
- Release date: 1 January 1963
- Running time: 113 minutes
- Country: France
- Language: French

Les bricoleurs (The Handymen) is a 1963 French thriller film directed by Jean Girault and starring Francis Blanche, Darry Cowl, Elke Sommer and Jacqueline Maillan. It was released in the United States as Who Stole the Body?

== Premise ==
Two estate agents discover a body in a house they are about to sell to a customer.

== Cast ==
- Francis Blanche : Edouard
- Darry Cowl : Félix
- Jacqueline Maillan : L'anglaise
- Clément Harari : Le professeur Hippolyte
- Elke Sommer : Brigitte
- Daniel Ceccaldi : La Banque Hubert
- Claudine Coster : Ingrid
- Mario David : Georges, l'ami de Monica
- Valérie Lagrange : Monica
- Rolande Ségur : Princess Elisabeth
- Bernard Dhéran : inspector de l'auto-école
- Daniel Emilfork : Igor, le domestique du professeur Hippolyte
- Serge Marquand : Le chasseur du professeur
- Paul Mercey : Le curé
- André Badin : Ludovic, le chauffeur de l'Anglaise
- Yves Barsacq : Le maître d'hôtel de La Banque
- Roger Carel : Le comte de La Bigle
- Philippe Castelli : Le facteur
- Marcel Pérès : Le garde-chasse
- Jacques Seiler : Le majordome du comte
- Jean Tissier : Le professeur Gédéon Depois-Demesure
- Gisèle Sandre : La dernière victime
- France Anglade : Une jeune femme passant son permis
- Christian Méry : Un homme passant son permis
- Ski Hi Lee : Le voleur de la banque
