= Baillargeon Brothers =

20th-century Canadian strongmen and professional wrestlers

Tag team
- Members: Adrien Baillargeon; Antonio Baillargeon; Charles Baillargeon; Jean Baillargeon; Lionel Baillargeon; Paul Baillargeon

The Baillargeon Brothers were Canadian strongmen and professional wrestlers. They were called "the six strongest brothers in the world".

== Early life ==
The Baillargeon Brothers were from Saint-Magloire-de-Bellechasse, Quebec, Canada. They were known for their strength, even in childhood, and often worked on farms and later as lumberjacks.

The brothers became involved in entertainment on November 26, 1946. Jean Baillargeon went to a vaudeville show where a wrestler named "Sheik Abid" offered $100 to anyone who could lift as much as him; the performer lifted 725 pounds (329 kg). After insisting several times on attempting this feat, Baillargeon was given a barbell weighing 130-150 pounds to lift in the standing-snatch position, a feat that Sheik Abid demonstrated. He completed the task, though his hand was off-balance. The promoters were going to disqualify him, but the crowd booed and he was given $25 to leave. Juliette Veilleux, a spectator who later became the wife of Antonio Baillargeon, spoke of this feat to Canadian weightlifter and former champion Gérard Michaud, who told Jean about the possibilities of working in the field.

== Strongman act ==
In 1947, the brothers (minus Antonio) put on a strongman show with the Dionne Brothers, who were acrobats. The show attracted 4,000 spectators and led to four more shows the month after. Antonio then joined his brothers for their performances after returning from school. The two sets of brothers became a traveling act, performing throughout Canada and the United States. The brothers wore a costume that had the Canadian maple leaf with a beaver inside that said, "6 Baillargeon Brothers". The troupe performed a 10-act show which notably featured Charles pulling a bus with his teeth, as well as a human pyramid.

The brothers met Bob Hoffman, who was the owner of Strength & Health magazine in 1948 at a weightlifting exhibition. While the performance was not perfect, it earned them coverage in the magazine and helped them further grow their brand.

== Professional wrestling ==
The brothers later were trained in professional wrestling and made their debut in 1949, with the Jean, Adrien and Paul winning their debut matches. They competed in various promotions including Gulf Coast Championship Wrestling, Maple Leaf Wrestling and Big Time Wrestling.

=== Jean Baillargeon ===
Jean Baillargeon (May 2, 1915 - March 2, 1994) - He defeated Hassan Bay in his professional debut in 1949. He won a one-day tournament for Promotions Eddie Quinn in 1950 and later won the Alberta Tag Team Championship with Seelie Samara on April 23, 1954. Jean ended up having a 15 year career in wrestling.

=== Charles Baillargeon ===
Charles Baillargeon (July 8, 1917 - February 10, 2010) - His specialty was performing lifting and pulling feats of strength with his teeth. Charles defeated Charlie Guilman in his 1949 professional wrestling debut. His professional wrestling career with cut short due to a car accident in 1955. After wrestling and strongman competitions, he worked in the hotel business with his brother, Paul.

=== Adrien Baillargeon ===
Adrien Baillargeon (October 26, 1918 - May 9, 1995) - Like his brothers, he debuted as a professional wrestler in 1949. He was the runner up in a tournament for the NWA Canadian Heavyweight Championship in June 1955. He won the NWA World Tag Team Championship in 1955 with his brother, Paul. He won the NWA Louisiana Tag Team Championship with Tony Jiminez in March 1960 and won the Mid-South Louisiana Heavyweight Championship in February 1960. He later moved to Lafayette, Louisiana.

=== Lionel Baillargeon ===
Lionel Baillargeon (July 4, 1921 - June 19, 1982) - He made his professional wrestling debut in 1949 against Willie Debeau. He was a Canadian Junior Heavyweight wrestling champion and retired in 1958.

=== Paul Baillargeon ===
Paul Baillargeon (July 19, 1922 - October 18, 1999) - His specialty was lifting horses. He made his professional wrestling debut in 1949 against Paul Lortie and was nicknamed "The French Canadian Bear". He held the NWA Canadian Open Tag Team Championship with Whipper Billy Watson and won the NWA World Tag Team Championship with his brother, Adrien. He said to be the biggest wrestling star of the brothers. After retiring from wrestling in 1960, he was the owner of "Hotel Baillargeon" and was the President of the Quebec Hotel Association.

=== Antonio Baillargeon ===
Antonio Baillargeon (November 22, 1928 – March 14, 1997), also known as Tony Baillargeon - He debuted in 1949 against Charlie Guilman at the age of 20. He was said to have wrestled 3,000 matches in 45 different states in the US. He held the NWA World Tag Team Championship with Pat O'Connor, the NWA World World Tag Team Championship with Maurice Lapoine and the NWA Gulf Coast Tag Team Championship with his brother Adrien. He retired in 1976.
