= George Scott (wrestler) =

Canadian professional and amateur wrestler (1929–2014)

Personal information
- Born: August 27, 1929 Dalmeny, Scotland
- Died: January 20, 2014 (aged 84) Indian Rocks Beach, Florida, U.S.

Professional wrestling career
- Ring name(s): George Scott; The Great Scott; Benny Becker
- Billed height: 6 ft 1 in (1.85 m)
- Billed weight: 235 lb (107 kg)
- Debut: 1948
- Retired: 1985

George Scott (August 27, 1929 – January 20, 2014) was a Canadian professional wrestler, booker and promoter. From the 1950s until the 1970s, he and his younger brother Sandy competed as The Flying Scotts in North American regional promotions including the National Wrestling Alliance, particularly the Midwest and Mid-Atlantic territories, as well as successful stints in the American Wrestling Association, Maple Leaf Wrestling and Stampede Wrestling.

Scott was also the longtime head booker for the Jim Crockett Promotions working under promoter Jim Crockett, Jr. during the 1970s and with Vince McMahon during the World Wrestling Federation's national expansion during the early 1980s. He helped organize many of the early PPV events such as WrestleMania I and WrestleMania 2 as well as the early cards for the WWF's weekly television shows Saturday Night's Main Event, Prime Time Wrestling and Superstars of Wrestling.

On the Steve Austin Show Unleashed Podcast, Scott was credited by Ric Flair as the person who came up with the idea that to reverse the Figure-four leglock, the opponent would simply turn over onto their stomach.

== Professional wrestling career ==
=== Early life and career ===
George Scott was the first born son to his parents, Walter James Scott Sr. and Jeannie Mackay. He was born in Dalmeny, Scotland while his parents were visiting relatives and, returning to Canada, was raised in Hamilton, Ontario. He grew up with his siblings Angus and Walter. His sister Jeannie Gow Scott, at the age of 11, suffered appendicitis during a return trip from Scotland on the SS Athenia, and was pronounced dead in Montreal, Quebec, on October 25, 1937. She is buried in Woodland Cemetery, Hamilton, Ontario.

Involved in hockey, basketball, and roller skating as a child, Scott began amateur wrestling at the local YMCA at age 12 and, during the next year, also started weightlifting.

Living nearby Ben and Mike Sharpe, both well known professional wrestlers in Hamilton at the time, he also faced Martin Hutzler in an amateur bout at the YMCA. Making his professional debut in Wasaga Beach at age 17, he was helped in his early career by Pat Murphy and Dano Macdonald. During the late 1940s, Scott attempted to convince local promoter Joe Maiche to wrestle in the Brantford armories before being signed by Toledo promoter Jack Pfefer and promoted as an up-and-coming wrestler. As Benny Becker, would gain considerable experience from many veteran wrestlers in the territory and would later face "Nature Boy" Buddy Rogers and Gorgeous George several times in his early career.

=== National Wrestling Alliance ===
After a brief stint with Georgia Championship Wrestling and Jim Crockett Promotions, Scott eventually found his way back to Canada where he wrestled for promoter John Katan in Toronto and made his debut in Maple Leaf Gardens in November 1950. While there, he and Whipper Billy Watson had an altercation in which he appeared with Watson on the undercard facing Lee Henning. The following day, a local newspaper wrote how Scott's match stole the show and Scott began appearing in the opening matches for much of his time in the promotion thereafter.

In 1952, following a match against Buddy Rogers in Florida, Scott collapsed in the bathroom of his apartment. He was eventually found by a friend who, noticing the bathroom light on, broke into the apartment when Scott failed to respond to his knocking on the door. Brought to a local hospital, Scott was told he had passed out due to a deep bruise in his hip and was eventually flown back to Toronto where he was diagnosed with three ruptured discs in his back caused when Rogers had kicked him in the back during their match.

Although doctors recommended surgery, Scott refused when he was told he would be unable to wrestle again. Taking a year off to recuperate, he lived with his parents while John Katan, Jack Laskin and Jack Tunney held stags and fundraising events to help his family as Scott remained paralyzed for six months.

Worried that he might suffer another more serious injury, his parents had tried to encourage him to retire and his mother suggesting a career in law enforcement. Although he began working as a bouncer for a time and was offered a managerial position at the bar he worked for, he declined and eventually returned to active competition in Stu Hart's Stampede Wrestling in 1954.

=== The Flying Scotts ===
Helping his brother Angus break into the wrestling business in 1953, Scott began teaming with his brother in Stampede Wrestling shortly after his recovery later winning the NWA Canadian Tag Team Championship in 1954. After a brief stint in Maple Leaf Gardens in 1955, The Flying Scotts, as they were known, became one of the top tag teams in the Toronto and Buffalo areas during the late 1950s. Defeating Chris and John Tolos for the Stampede International Tag Team Championship in 1958, they would feud with Butcher and Mad Dog Vachon the following year.

Scott would also return to the Carolinas with his brother during the 1960s before eventually regained the Stampede International Tag Team Championship in 1963. They would also win the Indiana version of the AWA World Tag Team Championship and, while in Australia during the late 1960s, won the IWA World Tag Team Championship three times between 1966 and 1968.

While in Stu Hart's Stampede Wrestling in 1954, he and Angus would become one of the most popular tag teams in Western Canada during their six-year stay in the promotion. At one event, in which they were featured in the main event against The Miller Brothers (Bill and Ed Miller), promoters were forced to turn away 6,000 at a Stampede Wrestling event before splitting up. The two would eventually have a falling out after the death of their mother resulting in Angus refusing to attend her funeral.

Scott spent a short time (1968) in Championship wrestling based in Fort Worth Texas at the North side arena, the promotion was later bought by Fritz Von Erich and renamed WCCW. Scott as a baby face had bloody matches with Johnny Valentine, once Valentine ripped Scotts shirt off and ran him into the ring post, Scott spent the night in the hospital because Valentine went too far and really injured him.

=== Stampede Wrestling ===
Remaining in Calgary, Scott had a successful singles career while with Stampede Wrestling during the 1950s and 60s. When Billy Watson appeared in the area in the late 1960s, he refused to defend his title against Scott as well as Luther Lindsay and George Gordienko. According to Scott, this was the result of their argument in Toronto years before.

While wrestling Killer Kowalski during a match in Calgary, fans reportedly began chanting "We want Scott". The following night at an event in Edmonton, Watson asked Scott to team with him in Toronto to which Scott declined. Scott has stated in later interviews that he regretted that decision as the wrestler who eventually teamed with Watson, Billy Red Lyons whose career would take off after that match.

Involved in booking for Stu Hart and Jim Crockett during the early 1970s, he declined offers to tour Japan and instead chose to continue wrestling for both Stampede Wrestling and the Mid-Atlantic territory. He teamed with El Mongol and Jimmy Dancing Bear in 6-man tag team matches against Buddy Colt and The Assassins in late 1971 and, the following year, he lost to Superstar Billy Graham in Chicago on November 3, 1972, Suffering a neck injury while wrestling in Texas, he was forced to retire the following year reuniting with his brother Angus against Atlantic Coast Tag Team Champions Gene & Ole Anderson in Winston-Salem, North Carolina, on May 26, 1973, retiring later that year.

=== Jim Crockett Promotions and the Mid-Atlantic territory ===
In the years following his retirement, George gained a reputation as one of the leading bookers in the industry. Brought in by John Ringly, who had recently taken over Jim Crockett Promotions after the death of his father-in-law Jim Crockett, Sr., and stayed on after David and Jim Crockett, Jr. assumed control of the promotion.

During his first few years in the Carolinas, he made major changes in the promotion including changing its focus from traditional tag team wrestling to singles competitors by bringing Wahoo McDaniel, The Super Destroyer and Johnny Valentine, with Valentine being the top wrestler in the territory. Although fans were slow to respond to the sudden shift, Valentine had become one of the most popular wrestlers in the region within several months. He also signed younger wrestlers such as "Superfly" Jimmy Snuka, Roddy Piper, Ricky "The Dragon" Steamboat and "Nature Boy" Ric Flair, and became a major influence during their early careers.

During the late-1970s, Scott became a partner with Jim Crockett buying a third of Toronto promoter Frank Tunney's promotion for $100,000. This allowed them access to southern Ontario and parts of the northeastern United States as well as bringing in wrestlers from Maple Leaf Wrestling and the Carolinas. This would continue for several years until Frank Tunney's death in 1983 and his nephew Jack Tunney sided with the World Wrestling Federation when they entered the area during the mid-1980s; Scott later sued Jack Tunney and eventually received a $500,000 settlement and $150,000 in legal expenses in 1992.

In 1981, Scott chose to leave Jim Crockett Promotions due to a pay dispute and resigned his position after giving Jim Crockett six weeks notice. Although Jim Crockett attempted to take Scott to court, the matter was soon dropped. Receiving numerous offers from promoters across the country, Scott took several months off before agreeing to temporarily assist Atlanta promoter Jim Barnett and Georgia Championship Wrestling for two months.

Scott was approached by Eddie Einhorn to become a partner in his International Wrestling Association, offering him a $250,000 salary and a percentage of the promotion, but Scott eventually declined. During this time, he also looking into purchasing the rights for the NWA's Oklahoma territory although he walked away from the deal allowing Bill Watts to purchase the territory for his Universal Wrestling Federation/Mid-South promotion.

=== World Wrestling Federation ===
In 1983, Scott received a call from Vince McMahon Sr. with whom he had a close working relationship while with Jim Crockett Promotions. Agreeing to assist his son Vince McMahon who had recently taken over the World Wrestling Federation, he was immediately sent to Atlanta to oversee the WWF's purchase of the Saturday night timeslot on TBS, forcing out Georgia Championship Wrestling and resulting what became known as "Black Saturday". He was later involved in negotiations with Keith Hart for the McMahon's buyout of Stampede Wrestling which, according to Stu Hart in his biography Stu Hart: Lord of the Ring, was concluded by a handshake agreement. The official sale was finalized by Jim Barnett on August 24, 1984, for $1,000,000 to be paid off $100,000 a year.

While in the area, he began running events in Miami, Florida, which soon became very profitable for the company, and he soon began booking for the entire promotion. Between 1984 and 1985, the WWF was grossing between $3 million and $4 million on weekends. He was directly involved in planning some of the biggest events in the promotion's history including WrestleMania I and 2, the first televised shows for Saturday Night's Main Event and the supercard Big Event at Toronto's Exhibition Stadium. Scott appeared on-camera at WrestleMania when, during the main event between Hulk Hogan & Mr. T and "Rowdy" Roddy Piper and Paul Orndorff, he pulled guest official Muhammad Ali out of the ring as he was supposed to be an outside-the-ring referee.

Prior to WrestleMania, he took part in the initial negotiations with Mr. T to appear in the main event. Despite an argument between him and Mr. T, the disagreement was eventually settled and he agreed to appear; Mr. T later ran up $22,000 in expenses during the week leading up to WrestleMania.

Scott was also one of the key officials who attempted to clean up the widespread drug use among wrestlers in the promotion. He was involved in setting up the WWF's initial drug testing program. Those who failed the drug test would be suspended for six weeks and, if caught a second time, would be released from the company. Although having control of most of the roster, he and then WWF World Heavyweight Champion Hulk Hogan became involved in a heated argument during an event at Madison Square Garden regarding "some unsavory characters" hanging around backstage. Hogan, who by this time was gaining some political clout, went over Scott's head complaining about the incident to promoter Vince McMahon.

He worked three days straight with NBC producer Dick Ebersol on Saturday Night's Main Event I. He and Ebersol disagreed on the show's content, with Ebersol in favor of a Saturday Night Live-style show as opposed to Scott's ideas for a traditional wrestling event. The format had been previously used on the WWF's Tuesday Night Titans. Eventually, Scott decided to resign due to overwork, the changing direction of the company and ongoing conflicts with Hogan and other wrestlers.

=== Later career and retirement ===
After leaving the WWF in 1986, he briefly worked for Fritz Von Erich in Dallas replacing Ken Mantell, who had left the promotion earlier that year. Although Dave Meltzer's The Wrestling Observer newsletter reported that he had joined the promotion in August, other sources such as David Manning's Heroes of World Class have claimed he had joined the promotion shortly before Kerry Von Erich's motorcycle accident the previous month.

Scott's time in WCCW was brief however and, according to Gary Hart, he resigned his position after failing to force Hart out of the promotion. Scott, who reportedly regarded Hart as a threat to his position, had scheduled a match between Abdullah the Butcher and Bruiser Brody at the supercard Christmas Star Wars '86 later that year. However, he secretly withheld from the participants that the match, in which Abdullah the Butcher would lose to Brody, would be a loser-leaves-Texas match. Brody would eventually find out about the arrangement and instead agreed to lose to Abdullah causing him to leave the promotion. Brody would return to WCCW as the masked wrestler Red River Jack and, with Scott leaving the promotion shortly after, Brody replaced him as head booker. He later went back to work for Crockett in 1988, taking over creative rights of the promotion but lightning didn't strike twice and his run was brief as he was fired in April 1989, due to the lack of promotion for the Clash of the Champions, and was replaced by the NWA booking committee. He started up a promotion in the Carolinas called South Atlantic Pro Wrestling in the early 1990s. It got off to a promising start but shut down in 1994.

== Personal life ==
Retiring to Indian Rocks Beach, Florida, with his wife Jean, a former City Commissioner who has long been active in local politics. Scott also became involved in real estate and rental property, as well as his involvement in numerous charitable events, specifically his assistance in establishing the Eblen Foundation in Asheville, North Carolina, which helps underprivileged families.

In 2001, he was among several honorees at the Cauliflower Alley Club Banquet & Reunion. Scott was also acknowledged by Vince McMahon, who publicly thanked him for his contributions to the World Wrestling Federation during a wrestling event later that year.

Scott was diagnosed with lung cancer in November 2011. He entered hospice care in October 2013 and died a few months later on January 20, 2014.

== Championships and accomplishments ==
- American Wrestling Alliance
  - AWA World Tag Team Championship (2 times) - with Sandy Scott
- Cauliflower Alley Club
  - Other honoree (2001)
- Central States Wrestling
  - NWA World Tag Team Championship (Central States version) (1 time) - with Sandy Scott
- George Tragos/Lou Thesz Professional Wrestling Hall of Fame
  - Class of 2004
- Japan Wrestling Association
  - NWA International Tag Team Championship (1 time) - with Sandy Scott
- Mid-Atlantic Championship Wrestling
  - NWA Southern Tag Team Championship (Mid-Atlantic version) (2 times) - with Sandy Scott
- NWA Big Time Wrestling
  - NWA American Tag Team Championship (1 time) - with Mr. Wrestling
  - NWA Texas Heavyweight Championship (1 time)
- Stampede Wrestling
  - Alberta Tag Team Championship (3 times) - with Sandy Scott
  - NWA Canadian Tag Team Championship (Calgary version) (4 times) - with Sandy Scott
  - NWA International Tag Team Championship (Calgary version) (6 times) - with Sandy Scott
- World Championship Wrestling (Australia)
  - IWA World Tag Team Championship (3 times) - with Sandy Scott
- World Wide Wrestling Federation
  - WWWF United States Tag Team Championship (1 time) - with Buddy Austin
