= Ski Hi Lee =

American professional wrestler

Personal information
- Born: Robert Hayes Leedy; 9 February 1921 Pierceton, Indiana, United States or Toronto, Ontario, Canada
- Died: May 31, 1974 (aged 53) London, England, United Kingdom

Professional wrestling career
- Ring name(s): Bob Lee; Hi Lee; Jack Lee; Robert E. Lee; Ski Hi Lee; Sky High Lee; Sky Hi Lee; Sky Hy Lee; Tiny Lee
- Billed height: 6 ft 7 in - 6 ft 11 in (2.11 m)
- Billed weight: 280 lb - 300 lb (140 kg)
- Billed from: El Paso, Texas, United States; Houston, Texas, United States; Toronto, Ontario, Canada
- Debut: 1944
- Retired: 1968

Robert Hayes Leedy (9 February 1921 – 31 May 1974) was an American professional wrestler, boxer and actor, better known by his ring name, Ski Hi Lee (also spelled Sky Hi Lee, Sky High Lee, and Sky Hy Lee). Known for his great height and strength, he was described as the tallest professional wrestler of his era and as "among the roughest in the business".

== Early life ==
Leedy was born on 9 February 1921 in Pierceton, Indiana, United States. Others say Toronto.

== Professional wrestling career ==
Leedy began wrestling in 1944. During the late 1940s, he wrestled for various promotions in the United States and Canada. Midget wrestler Sky Low Low, who debuted in the late 1940s, adopted his ring name in reference to Lee.

By 1950, Lee was appearing with the Calgary, Alberta-based Big Time Wrestling promotion. On 26 February 1951, Lee defeated Al Mills for the promotion's NWA Canadian Heavyweight Championship. Mills regained the championship from Lee the following month. Lee won the championship from Mills a second time on 29 January 1952, once again losing the championship to Mills in a rematch the following month. On 2 April 1955, Lee and Earl McCready defeated Fritz Von Erich and Lou Sjoberg for the Alberta Tag Team Championship. They lost the championship back to Von Erich and Sjoberg later that month. On 20 May 1955, Lee defeated Von Erich and Sjoberg for the championship a second time, this time with Don Lee as his partner. Lee continued to wrestle for Big Time Wrestling until at least 1956.

In 1957, Lee wrestled 30 matches in Australia - including two bouts against NWA World Heavyweight Champion Lou Thesz - followed by a single bout in New Zealand. In mid-1957, Lee wrestled for NWA Los Angeles, where he briefly held the NWA International Television Tag Team Championship alongside Shag Thomas. In late-1957, Lee began wrestling for the Honolulu, Hawaii-based promotion 50th State Big Time Wrestling. He continued to wrestle for the promotion until early 1959. During his stint in Hawaii, Lee lived in Waikiki in Honolulu.

In late-1958, Lee toured Japan with the Japan Pro Wrestling Alliance, participating in the "International Competitions of the Fall" series as one-half of a tag team with Don Leo Jonathan. While in East Asia, Lee visited Formosa during the Second Taiwan Strait Crisis, reportedly being introduced to Chiang Kai-shek.

In the early-1960s, Lee toured South Africa. In 1961, Jeremy Taylor recorded a satirical song entitled "Ag Pleez Deddy" ("Oh Please Daddy") in which reference is made to a scheduled bout between Lee and the South African wrestler Willie Liebenberg.

After finishing his tour, Lee flew to the United Kingdom in 1962 to exchange his pay, which he had been given in pound sterling. He ultimately settled in the UK, working for Joint Promotions and other companies. During his time in the UK, he faced Tiger Joe Robinson in a bout that promoter Atholl Oakeley described as "one of the finest fights ever seen in London".

Leedy's last recorded bouts were in July 1968, when he toured Japan with International Wrestling Enterprise as part of its "Big Summer Series".

== Professional wrestling persona ==
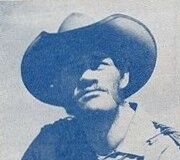
Lee in 1953 wearing his signature stetson.

Early in his career Lee wrestled as a face and was billed from his hometown of Toronto. He used various ring names before settling on "Ski Hi Lee". Later in his career, Lee wrestled as a heel and was billed as being a cowboy from El Paso, Texas (or, less commonly, Houston, Texas) in the United States, with his character described as a "country bumpkin version of Jaws" and a "roughneck" and supposedly being the son of the Texas Ranger "Hi Lee". Lee was described by Pat Barrett as "one of the most hated men in wrestling, on a par with Roddy Piper"; on at least one occasion he was attacked by multiple audience members while leaving the ring.

Lee had a distinctive appearance, with Bob Leonard describing him as "this great big, raw-boned guy who had the look of a corpse that had been left hanging around for a couple of days [who had] long, shaggy hair [and was] always unshaven". His hair was described as a "lion-like mane". One writer described his "large head, long curly locks, sideburns, walrus moustache and 'mutton-chop' whiskers". Lee was referred to by one audience member as "the first person I ever saw who was a lean 292 pounds". He was known to wear a stetson.

Lee wrestled in a brawling style that emphasised his height and strength, with frequent choking and gouging. His finishers included a backbreaker, a knee drop, and a right-handed punch.

== Boxing career ==
Robin Lee
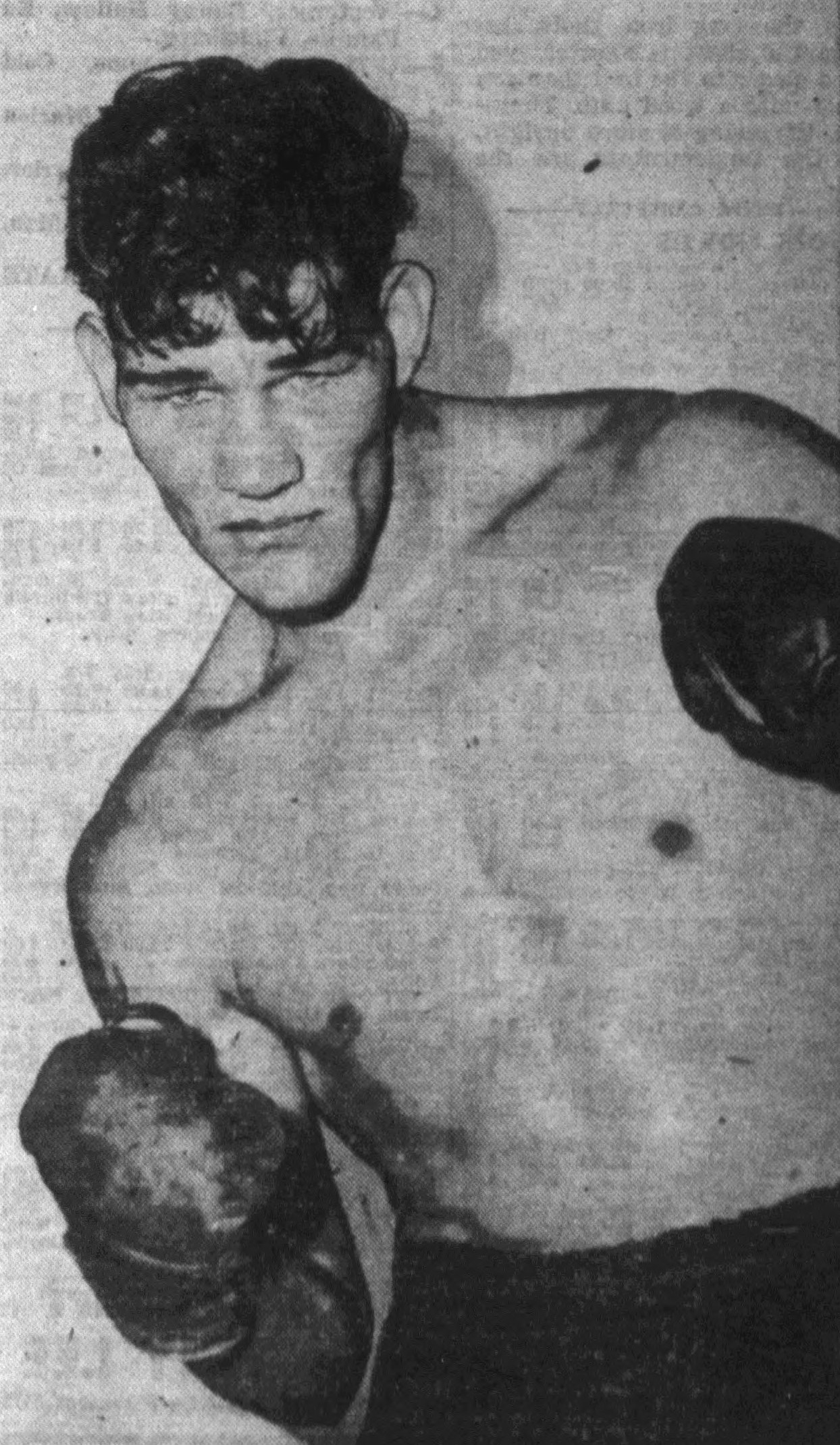

Personal information
- Nickname: "Tiny"
- Born: Robert Hayes Leedy
- Height: 6 ft 7 in (201 cm)
- Weight: Heavyweight

Boxing career
- Reach: 87 in (221 cm)
- Stance: Orthodox

Boxing record
- Total fights: 17
- Wins: 11
- Win by KO: 5
- Losses: 1

Leedy boxed from 1945 to 1946 as a heavyweight under the ring name Robin "Tiny" Lee (sometimes referred to as simply "Tiny Lee"). Fighting out of San Francisco, California, he was billed as 6 feet 7 inches (201 cm) with an 87 inches (220 cm) reach. He is recorded by BoxRec as having fought 17 bouts between July 11, 1945, and June 25, 1946, of which he won 11, lost five, and drew one. In September 1945, he reportedly defeated Billy Gilbert by knockout in 14 seconds.

17 fights	11 wins	5 losses
By knockout	10	4
By decision	1	1
Draws	1	

No.	Result	Record	Opponent	Type	Date	Location
17	Loss	11–5–1	(United States) Johnny Haynes	KO	25 June 1946	(United States) Grand Olympic Auditorium, Los Angeles, California, U.S.
16	Loss	11–4–1	(United States) Tex Boddie	TKO	13 May 1946	(United States) Ak-Sar-Ben Racetrack and Coliseum, Omaha, Nebraska, U.S.
15	Win	11–3–1	(United States) Charley Johnson	KO	30 April 1946	(United States) Civic Auditorium, San Jose, California U.S.
14	Loss	10–3–1	(United States) Doug Ellison	PTS	23 April 1946	(United States) Memorial Auditorium, Sacramento, California U.S.
13	Win	10–2–1	(United States) Lowell Strong	TKO	28 March 1946	(United States) Civic Auditorium, San Francisco, California, U.S.
12	Loss	9–2–1	(Argentina) Abel Cestac	KO	28 February 1946	(United States) Auditorium, Minneapolis, Minnesota U.S.
11	Win	9–1–1	(United States) Lindy Elliott	TKO	15 February 1946	(United States) St. Paul Auditorium, Saint Paul, Minnesota, U.S.
10	Win	8–1–1	(United States) Tiger Sullivan	KO	4 February 1946	(United States) City Auditorium, Omaha, Nebraska, U.S.
9	Win	7–1–1	(United States) Bill McClure	KO	31 January 1946	(United States) Auditorium, Minneapolis, Minnesota, U.S.
8	Win	6–1–1	(United States) Charley Johnson	PTS	21 December 1945	(United States) National Hall, San Francisco, California, U.S.
7	Win	5–1–1	(United States) Johnny Ebarb	TKO	23 November 1945	(United States) Civic Auditorium, San Francisco, California, U.S.
6	Loss	4–1–1	(United States) Doug Ellison	TKO	5 October 1945	(United States) National Hall, San Francisco, California, U.S.
5	Win	4–0–1	(United States) Billy Gilbert	KO	14 September 1945	(United States) Civic Auditorium, San Francisco, California, U.S.
4	Win	3–0–1	(United States) Frankie Estrada	KO	3 August 1945	(United States) National Hall, San Francisco, California, U.S.
3	Win	2–0–1	(United States) Joe Hudson	KO	24 July 1945	(United States) Civic Auditorium, San Jose, California, U.S.
2	Win	1–0–1	(United States) Battling Moore	KO	14 July 1945	(United States) Palo Alto, California, U.S.
1	Draw	0–0–1	(United States) Charley Johnson	PTS	11 July 1945	(United States) Auditorium, Oakland, California, U.S.

== Acting career ==
Leedy acted in three films: the French comedies L'Empire de la Nuit and Les Bricoleurs in 1962 and 1963 respectively, and the Indian mystery Nasihat in 1967.

Filmography
Year	Title	Role	Notes
1962	L'Empire de la Nuit ("The Empire of the Night")	Le géant ("The giant")	
1963	Les Bricoleurs ("The DIYers")	Le voleur de la banque ("The bank robber")	
1967	Nasihat ("Advice")	Henchman	

== Personal life ==
Leedy suffered from acromegaly. He had a high pain tolerance and would engage in geek show feats including chewing glass and allowing people to throw darts into his bare back.

Lee owned a 200-acre dude ranch in Bolton, Ontario (the "Rocking H"), as well as a restaurant in Toronto and 1,200 acres in Alberta.

Lee was a heavy drinker, reportedly drinking a forty of whisky for breakfast. Fellow wrestler Orig Williams described him as a "world-class drinker" who would drink three bottles of whisky daily. Fellow wrestler Al Oeming quoted Lee's aunt as bemoaning him having on one occasion drunk "a 26er of King's Straight for breakfast, a 26er at noon, and a 26er at night".

== Death ==
Leedy died on 31 May 1974 in his adopted home of London. His death has variously been ascribed to complications from acromegaly, alcohol intoxication, and health complications caused by a cook lacing a meal he had eaten with rat poison. He was cremated at South London Crematorium.

== Championships and accomplishments ==
- NWA Los Angeles
  - NWA International Television Tag Team Championship (1 time) - with Shag Thomas
- Stampede Wrestling
  - Alberta Tag Team Championship (2 times) - with Don Lee (1 time) and Earl McCready (1 time)
  - NWA Canadian Heavyweight Championship (2 times)
  - Stampede Wrestling Hall of Fame (Class of 1995)
