= Abe Zvonkin =

Canadian track and field athlete and wrestler

Profile
- Position: Tackle

Personal information
- Born: March 6, 1910; New York City, New York, United States
- Died: August 22, 2002 (aged 92); Hamilton, Ontario, Canada

Career information
- University: Queen's University

Career history
- 1933: Hamilton Tigers
- 1934–35: Queen's Golden Gaels
- 1937–39: Hamilton Tigers
- 1942–43: Hamilton Flying Wildcats

Awards and highlights
- Grey Cup champion (1943); CFL All-Star (1934)

Abe Zvonkin
Medal record

Men's Athletics

Representing Canada

British Empire Games
Bronze medal – third place	1930 Hamilton	Discus throw

Abe Zvonkin (March 6, 1910 – August 22, 2002) was a Canadian track and field athlete, an all-star and Grey Cup champion Canadian football player and professional wrestler. He was born in New York City, United States and died in Hamilton, Ontario.

== Personal life ==
Abe Zvonkin was born in New York City, son of Russian immigrants. The family later moved to Canada when Zvonkin was only two years old. He attended the Queen's University in Kingston, Ontario, where he began playing football. Zvonkin was married for 73 years to Jean Zvokin and together they had three children, one daughter and two sons. After retiring from professional wrestling Zvorkin would travel the United States and Canada competing in dog shows for many years. He died on August 22, 2002, from Cancer.

== Athletics ==
While Zvonkin was born in New York, New York, he represented Canada at the 1930 Empire Games. At the games Zvonkin won the bronze medal in the discus throw event. He finished fourth in the shot put competition, one place out of medal contention.

== Canadian Football ==
Zvonkin began his football career in 1933 with the Hamilton Tigers of the Ontario Rugby Football Union, but when he attended Queen's University he became an all-star in 1934 with the Queen's Golden Gaels. He returned to the Tigers for 3 more seasons in 1937, ending with his enlistment during World War II. He played two more seasons with the Hamilton Flying Wildcats, winning the Grey Cup in 1943, his last season.

== Professional wrestling career ==
After being influenced by Whipper Billy Watson, Zvorkin made his professional wrestling debut on March 24, 1944, defeating Al Dunlop. From the beginning Zvonkin played the heel (wrestling term for those who play the "bad guys"), thriving in the role. Over the years Zvonkin wrestled under a number of different identities or ring names, including masked characters Mr. X and the Purple Phantom. He also worked as "Mr. E" as well as under his real name, playing off his Russian heritage. Zvonkin retired in 1961.

== Championships and accomplishments ==
- Stampede Wrestling
  - Alberta Tag Team Championship (1 time) – with Jim Henry
