= Sandy Scott =

Canadian professional wrestler (1934-2010)

Personal information
- Born: Angus Mackay Scott; May 27, 1934 Hamilton, Ontario
- Died: March 11, 2010 (aged 75)

Professional wrestling career
- Ring name: Sandy Scott
- Debut: 1954

Angus Mackay Scott (May 27, 1934 – March 11, 2010), better known by his ring name Sandy Scott, was a Canadian professional wrestler. He worked with his older brother George from the 1950s until the 1970s as The Flying Scotts in North American regional promotions including the National Wrestling Alliance, particularly the Midwest and Mid-Atlantic territories, as well as successful stints in the American Wrestling Association, Maple Leaf Wrestling and Stampede Wrestling.

== Professional wrestling career ==
=== Early life and career ===
Scott was born Edinburgh, Scotland. At age five, he moved to Hamilton, Ontario, and growing up, he enjoyed football, wrestling at the YMCA and bodybuilding with Mike Sharpe.

=== The Flying Scotts ===
His older brother George helped Sandy break into the wrestling business in 1954. They began teaming in Stampede Wrestling, winning the NWA Canadian Tag Team Championship in 1954. After a brief stint in Maple Leaf Gardens in 1955, The Flying Scotts, as they were known, became one of the top tag teams in the Toronto and Buffalo areas during the late 1950s. Defeating Chris and John Tolos for the Stampede International Tag Team Championship in 1958, they would feud with Butcher and Mad Dog Vachon the following year.

The duo returned to the Carolinas during the 1960s before eventually regained the Stampede International Tag Team Championship in 1963. They also won the AWA World Tag Team Championship in Indiana and, while in Australia during the late 1960s, won the IWA World Tag Team Championship three times between 1966 and 1968.

While in Stampede Wrestling in 1954, they became one of the most popular tag teams in Western Canada during their six-year stay in the promotion. At one event, in which they were featured in the main event against The Miller Brothers (Bill and Ed Miller), promoters were forced to turn away 6,000 at a Stampede Wrestling event before splitting up. The two would eventually have a falling-out after the death of their mother, which resulted in Sandy refusing to attend her funeral.

=== Later career ===
During the 1980s, he was an office executive for Jim Crockett Promotions (JCP). When JCP was purchased by Ted Turner and renamed World Championship Wrestling (WCW), he continued to work for the company. He also acted as the host for WCW WorldWide.

In 1991, he helped found Smoky Mountain Wrestling with Jim Cornette and Rick Rubin.

In his last years he met local wrestler Michael "The Legendary Eclipso" Weddle from Salem, Va, who also promoted American Championship Wrestling and worked with them as commissioner and helped bring in talent like Johnny Weaver to help promote events, some of this can be found under ACW, Eclipso, Sandy Scott in youtube videos. He worked with ACW until his death and was remembered by a special event in Rocky Mt Va

== Personal life ==
After retiring from professional wrestling, he settled in Roanoke, Virginia, with his wife. He had two sons and a daughter. Scott died on March 11, 2010, from pancreatic cancer.

== Legacy ==
The name "Sandy Scott" was used by two other Scottish wrestlers - one from Glenrothes who later worked for Stampede Wrestling, the other from Wishaw.

== Championships and accomplishments ==
- American Wrestling Alliance
  - AWA World Tag Team Championship (2 times) – with George Scott
- Central States Wrestling
  - NWA World Tag Team Championship (Central States version) (1 time) – with George Scott
- Japan Wrestling Association
  - NWA International Tag Team Championship (1 time) – with George Scott
- Mid-Atlantic Championship Wrestling
  - NWA Southern Tag Team Championship (Mid-Atlantic version) (2 times) – with George Scott
  - NWA Atlantic Coast Tag Team Championship (1 time) – with Nelson Royal
  - NWA Wrestling Legends Hall of Heroes (2008)
- Southern States Wrestling
  - Kingsport Wrestling Hall of Fame (Class of 2001)
- Stampede Wrestling
  - Alberta Tag Team Championship (3 times) - with George Scott
  - NWA Canadian Tag Team Championship (Calgary version) (4 times) – with George Scott
  - NWA International Tag Team Championship (Calgary version) (6 times) – with George Scott
- World Championship Wrestling (Australia)
  - IWA World Tag Team Championship (3 times) – with George Scott
