= Fritz Von Goering =

American professional wrestler (1930–2024)

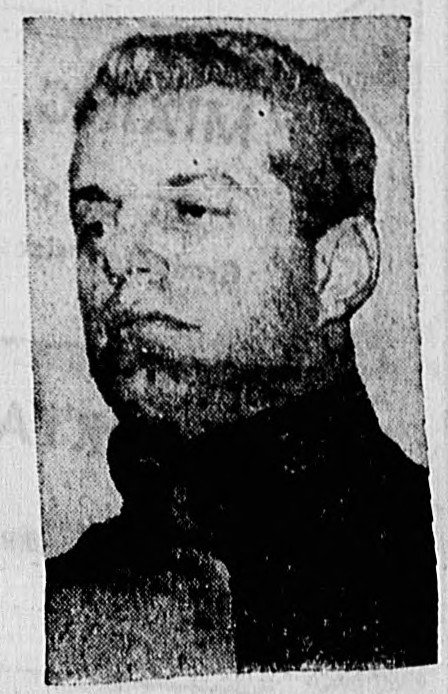
- Von Goering, circa 1956

Personal information
- Born: Harold Ray Jennings; March 31, 1930 San Francisco, California, U.S.
- Died: August 13, 2024 (aged 94)

Professional wrestling career
- Ring name(s): Fritz Von Goering; Fritz von Ulm; John Gabor; Johnny Gabor; Ray Jennings
- Billed height: 6 ft 3 in (191 cm)
- Billed weight: 255 lb (116 kg)
- Billed from: Berlin, Germany; Frankfurt, Germany; Nuremberg, Germany
- Trained by: Joe Pazandak
- Debut: 1949
- Retired: 1973

Fritz Von Goering (March 31, 1930 – August 13, 2024) was an American professional wrestler, known for playing a villainous German character in the 1950s, 1960s and 1970s.

== Early life ==
Fritz Von Goering was born as Harold Ray Jennings in San Francisco, California, on March 31, 1930, to an Irish-American family. Prior to his death, it was reported that he was born as John Gabor; he used the Gabor name throughout his personal life, including on legal documents. He reportedly grew up in Chicago, Illinois. After finishing high school, Gabor enlisted in the California National Guard, later serving in the United States Air Force.

== Professional wrestling career ==
Gabor became interested in combat fighting at a young age when his uncle brought him to boxing matches and he grew to admire profession wrestlers such as Lou Thesz and Bobby Managoff, both of whom he would wrestle with later in his career. According to Mercury News, Gabor was trained in gyms, where wrestlers "beat him up badly just to see how much he wanted to learn," writing: "Von Goering is one of the few successful wrestlers who does not have an amateur background; he isn't the product of a wrestling academy, nor did he rise up through the college or Olympic ranks." Greg Oliver reported that Gabor was trained by Joe Pazandak, whom Gabor recounted had subjected him to intense training.

Gabor started wrestling in aftermath of World War II, when it was common for heels (villains) to be portrayed as being from countries in the Axis powers. Despite not being of German descent, he was billed as "Fritz von Ulm", until a promoter in Minnesota altered it to include the Goering surname, which was based on Nazi Party figure Hermann Göring. As part of his character, he was billed as being from various German cities, but in reality had never been out of the United States at that point. Eventually his character was modified to be of East German origin, after relations with West Germany softened during the Cold War.

During his career, he captured several tag team championships. In 1962, he won the NWA Pacific Northwest Heavyweight Championship. Frequent rivals included Thesz and Managoff, as well as Dick Hutton, Pat O'Connor, and Bronko Nagurski. He was also paired against Buddy Rogers; Von Goering stated that he "hated [Roger's] guts offstage as well as on". He finished his career in Roy Shire's Big Time Wrestling promotion, where he teamed with Luke Graham.

== Retirement and death ==
After retiring in 1973, Gabor moved to Campbell, California, with his wife, Kay. He found work as a truck driver and a car salesman, which he said he sometimes found more difficult than wrestling. At the behest of Thesz, Gabor supported the George Tragos/Lou Thesz Professional Wrestling Hall of Fame after its creation in 1999. In 2009, he was personally inducted into the hall of fame, which typically inducts wrestlers with a background in amateur wrestling. Mike Chapman, then-executive director of the museum which oversaw the hall of fame stated: "Even though he never had an amateur background, Fritz was voted in quite easily, frankly, because the hall of fame recognized the kind of respect he had in the ring."

Gabor died on August 13, 2024, at the age of 94. His death was reportedly the result of heart failure.

== Championships and accomplishments ==
- George Tragos/Lou Thesz Professional Wrestling Hall of Fame
  - Class of 2009
- NWA San Francisco
  - NWA World Tag Team Championship (San Francisco version) (1 time) – with Gene Dubuque
- Pacific Northwest Wrestling
  - NWA Pacific Northwest Heavyweight Championship (1 time)
  - NWA Pacific Northwest Tag Team Championship (2 times) - with Maurice Vachon (1), Kurt von Poppenheim (1)
- Stampede Wrestling
  - Alberta Tag Team Championship (1 time) - with Charro Azteca
- Western States Sports
  - NWA International Tag Team Championship (1 time) - with Mike Padosis
