= Gorilla Marconi =

American professional wrestler (1917–1997)

Personal information
- Born: Francis Joseph Julian; April 5, 1917 Salem, Ohio, United States
- Died: March 1, 1997 (aged 79)

Professional wrestling career
- Ring name(s): Gorilla Marconi; Frank Marconi; The Beast; Black Shadow; Golden Terror; Mighty Bolo
- Billed height: 6 ft 1 in (185 cm)
- Billed weight: 276 lb (125 kg)
- Debut: 1937
- Retired: 1986

Francis Joseph Julian (April 5, 1917 – March 1, 1997) was an American professional wrestler known as Gorilla Marconi. He worked in various territories, notably in Calgary, Toronto, New York City, and Charlotte. Also worked for the World Wrestling Federation in the 1970s and 1980s.

== Professional wrestling career ==
Julian made his professional wrestling debut in 1937 in Ohio. In 1941, he worked in Argentina.

In 1948, made his debut in Calgary, Alberta for Stampede Wrestling. In 1954, won the Alberta Tag Team titles with Jim Henry.

During most of his career, he worked in various territories in Atlanta, Dallas, Charlotte, Toronto, Minneapolis, St. Louis, Vancouver, Oklahoma City, Kansas City and Houston.

In October 1962, he teamed with Art Michalik and Skull Murphy against Rikidozan, Kokichi Endo and Michiaki Yoshimura in a Best 2-out-of-3 Falls match in Japan for Japan Pro Wrestling Alliance in Nakatane, Japan with a record attendance of 15,000.

In 1970, Marconi returned to Stampede in Calgary only working for six months.

Marconi worked for the World Wide Wrestling Federation from 1976 to 1978 as enhancement talent against Bob Backlund, Chief Jay Strongbow, Bobo Brazil, Larry Zbyszko, and Dino Bravo.

Then in 1979, he returned to Toronto's Maple Leaf Wrestling where he became a regular until 1981.

In 1984 he returned to the World Wrestling Federation (formerly World Wide Wrestling Federation) where he worked events mainly in Toronto and Southern Ontario, after the WWF bought Maple Leaf Wrestling. He worked against The Iron Sheik, Tony Atlas, Jimmy Snuka, Tito Santana, George Steele, Junkyard Dog, and The Killer Bees. His last match was against Billy Jack Haynes on June 1, 1986, for Prime Time Wrestling at Maple Leaf Gardens in Toronto.

== Death ==
Marconi died on March 1, 1997, at 79.

== Championships and accomplishments ==
- Stampede Wrestling
  - NWA Alberta Tag Team Championship – with Jim Henry
