= Dr. Bill Miller =

American professional wrestler (1927–1997)

Personal information
- Born: William M. Miller; June 5, 1927 Fremont, Ohio, U.S.
- Died: March 24, 1997 (aged 69) Columbus, Ohio, U.S.
- Education: Ohio State University

Professional wrestling career
- Ring name(s): Big Bill Miller; Dr. Bill Miller; Doctor "X"; Mr. M The Crimson Knight
- Billed height: 6 ft 6 in (1.98 m)
- Billed weight: 290 lb (130 kg)
- Billed from: Fremont, Ohio
- Debut: 1951
- Retired: 1976

William M. Miller (June 5, 1927 – March 24, 1997) was an American professional wrestler. He was a one-time American Wrestling Association world champion and also wrestled in the National Wrestling Alliance, the World Wrestling Association and the World Wide Wrestling Federation.

== Professional wrestling career ==
Born on June 5, 1927, Miller was raised on the Twin Pines Farm in Fremont. He was a nine-letterman at Ohio State University in wrestling, football and track; he was also a member of the OSU team that won the 1950 Rose Bowl. He was an all-american heavyweight wrestler, a two-time Big Ten heavyweight champion, and Conference MVP in his senior year. Miller was also an All-American shot-put and discus track star. He was voted into the Ohio State University Athletic Hall of Fame in 1997 for both wrestling and track.

After a stint in the U.S. Navy, Miller began to wrestle professionally in Columbus under promoter Al Haft. He became a veterinarian while starting his wrestling career, hence, the "Dr." in his name. On May 1, 1952, Miller defeated Don Eagle to win the Ohio version of the AWA title, until losing it on September 2 to Don Arnold. He wrestled as "Mr. M" in the Minneapolis–Saint Paul area and held the AWA title for over seven months while engaging in a feud with Verne Gagne. On August 21, 1962, Mr. M was unmasked by Gagne. Under his own name, he wrestled in the Detroit area with The Sheik (Eddie Farhat) through the 60s. Miller also donned a mask as the Crimson Knight, until November 20, 1970, when he lost to Dory Funk Jr. and was subsequently unmasked by him. Near the end of his career, he worked for the WWA with Dick the Bruiser in the Indianapolis area. He was also a frequent challenger to Bruno Sammartino for the WWWF World Championship in the mid-1960s, facing him in a one-hour bout and a 48 second squash loss.

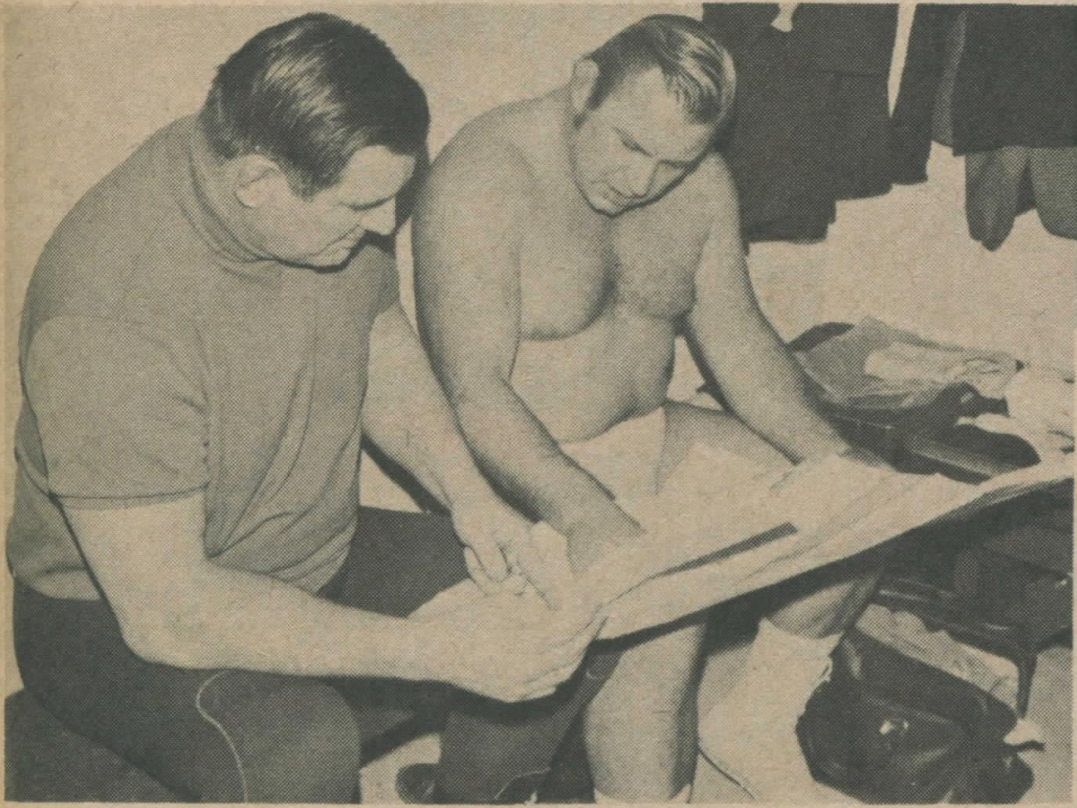
Bill and Dan Miller, c. 1973

In the early 1960s, Bill teamed with both his storyline brother Big Ed Miller (Edmund von Albers), and real life brother Danny Miller. From August 1965 to February 1966, Bill and Danny held the WWWF United States Tag Team Championship, winning it from Gorilla Monsoon & Cowboy Bill Watts, but losing them to Johnny Valentine & Tony Parisi at Madison Square Garden. He was also a part of a brutal feud against Ray Stevens for the San Francisco version of the United States title, leading to a death match between the two on June 21, 1969, at the Cow Palace, where guest referee Rocky Marciano knocked out Miller, disappointed in his rule breaking tactics.

After retiring from the ring in 1976, he returned to his first love of veterinarian medicine and opened a practice in Ohio, performing autopsies on animals.

== Death ==
On March 24, 1997, Miller died of a heart attack at the age of 69, after working out at a gym while leaving the building. He was survived by his wife and six children.

== Championships and accomplishments ==
- American Wrestling Association
  - AWA Canadian Open Tag Team Championship (1 time) - with Bob Geigel
  - AWA United States Heavyweight Championship (1 time)
  - AWA World Heavyweight Championship (1 time)
  - World Heavyweight Championship (Omaha version) (2 times)
- Central States Wrestling
  - NWA North American Tag Team Championship (Central States Version) (1 time) - with Bob Geigel
- George Tragos/Lou Thesz Professional Wrestling Hall of Fame
  - Class of 2005
- Southwest Sports, Inc. / NWA Big Time Wrestling
  - NWA Brass Knuckles Championship (Texas version) (1 time)
- International Pro Wrestling
  - IWA World Heavyweight Championship (1 time)
- St. Louis Wrestling Hall of Fame
  - Class of 2016
- Stampede Wrestling
  - Stampede Wrestling Hall of Fame (Class of 1995)
- World Championship Wrestling (Australia)
  - IWA World Tag Team Championship (1 time) - with Killer Kowalski
- World Wrestling Association (Indianapolis)
  - WWA World Tag Team Championship (1 time) - with Dick the Bruiser
- World Wide Wrestling Federation
  - WWWF United States Tag Team Championship (1 time) - with Dan Miller
- Wrestling Observer Newsletter
  - Wrestling Observer Newsletter Hall of Fame (Class of 2009)
