= List of American Wrestling Association attendance records =

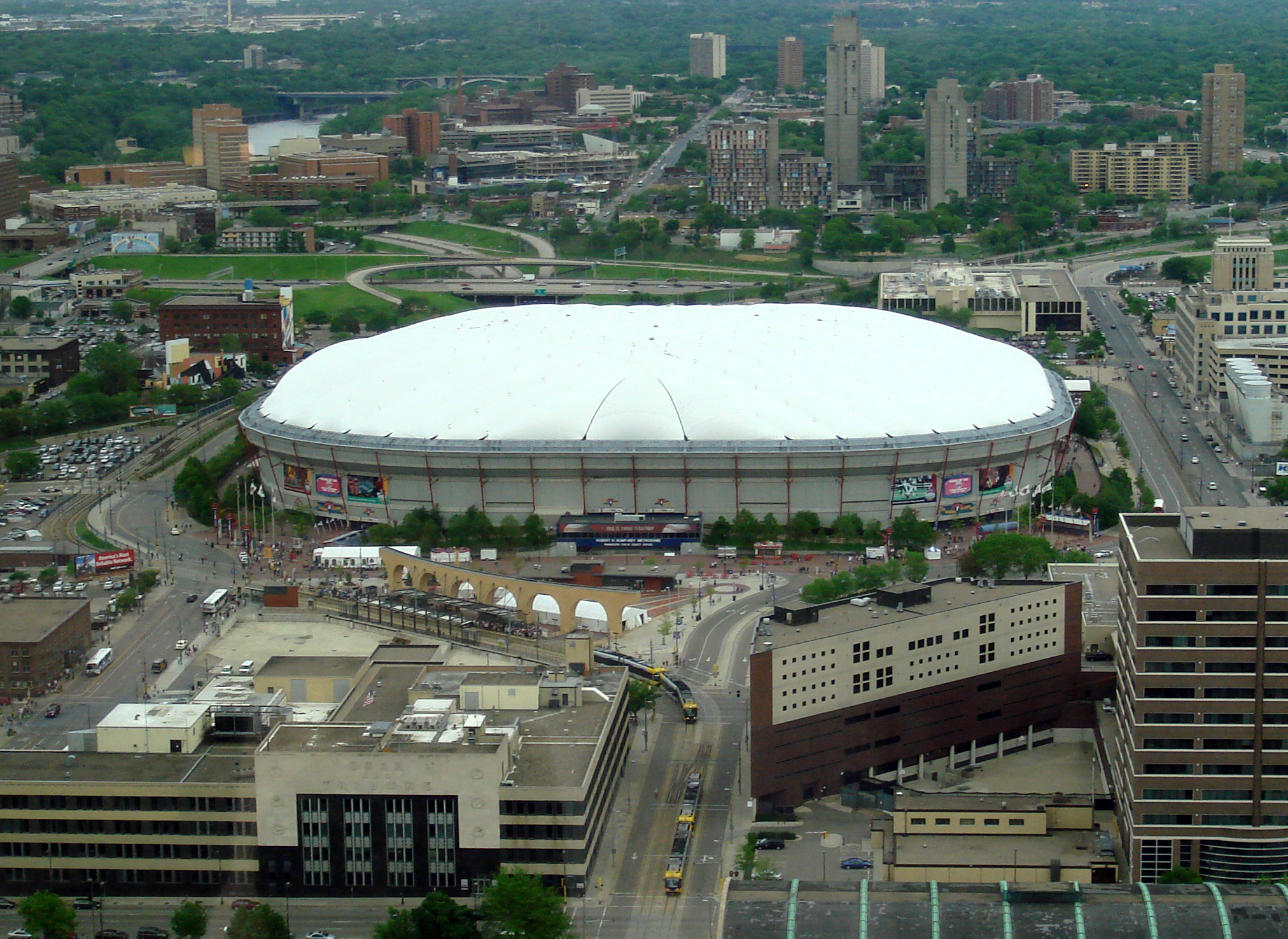
WrestleRock '86, held at the Hubert H. Humphrey Metrodome on April 20, 1986, was attended by 23,000 fans. It is the AWA's top gate attendance and among the biggest shows of the 1980s wrestling boom.

This is a list of American Wrestling Association attendance records. Established as the Minneapolis Boxing & Wrestling Club by Tony Stecher in 1933, it was among the first professional wrestling promotions in the United States. A founding member of the National Wrestling Alliance in 1948, Stecher controlled the NWA's "Minneapolis wrestling territory" which included much of the Great Lakes and Upper Midwestern United States. In 1959, Verne Gagne and Wally Karbo took control of the company and left the NWA the following year. The company was subsequently renamed the American Wrestling Association. With Gagne promoted as a legitimate rival to the NWA World Heavyweight Champion, the AWA closely matched the NWA in terms of attendances. In its heyday, the AWA was able to hold "stadium show" supercards at Comiskey Park, the International Amphitheater, Rosemont Horizon, Soldier Field and other major venues.

The AWA was considered one of the "Big Three", along with the National Wrestling Alliance and World Wide Wrestling Federation, during the "Territory-era" (1940s–1980s). Although its success continued into the early part of the 1980s wrestling boom, peaking with 23,000 fans at WrestleRock '86, the promotion was unable to compete against the national expansion of Vince McMahon's World Wrestling Federation, and eventually went bankrupt in 1991.

== Events and attendances ==
Promotion	Event	Location	Venue	Attendance	Main Event(s)
AWA	WrestleRock '86; April 20, 1986	Minneapolis, Minnesota	Hubert H. Humphrey Metrodome	23,000	The Road Warriors (Road Warrior Animal and Road Warrior Hawk) vs. The Fabulous Freebirds (Michael Hayes and Jimmy Garvin) in a Steel Cage match
AWA	Verne Gagne vs. Baron Von Raschke; August 14, 1970	Chicago, Illinois	Comiskey Park	21,000	Verne Gagne (c) vs. Baron Von Raschke in a Best 2-out-of-3 Falls match for the AWA World Heavyweight Championship
AWA	SuperClash; September 28, 1985	Chicago, Illinois	Comiskey Park	20,347	Rick Martel (c) vs. Stan Hansen for the AWA World Heavyweight Championship
AWA	20-Man Battle Royal; October 23, 1983	St. Paul, Minnesota	St. Paul Civic Center	19,120	20-man Battle Royal match
AWA	The Crusher & Greg Gagne vs. Sheik Adnan Al-Kaissey & Jerry Blackwell; March 25, 1984	St. Paul, Minnesota	St. Paul Civic Center	19,000	The Crusher and Greg Gagne vs. Sheik Adnan Al-Kaissey and Jerry Blackwell in a Steel Cage match
AWA	Nick Bockwinkel vs. Hulk Hogan; April 18, 1982	St. Paul, Minnesota	St. Paul Civic Center	18,969	Nick Bockwinkel (c) vs. Hulk Hogan for the AWA World Heavyweight Championship
AWA	Hulk Hogan & The High Flyers vs. Crusher Blackwell, Ken Patera & Sheik Adnan Al-Kaissey; November 4, 1983	Rosemont, Illinois	Rosemont Horizon	18,500	Hulk Hogan and The High Flyers (Greg Gagne and Jim Brunzell) vs. Crusher Blackwell, Ken Patera and Sheik Adnan Al-Kaissey
AWA	Jumbo Tsuruta vs. Blackjack Lanza; March 4, 1984	Rosemont, Illinois	Rosemont Horizon	18,000	Jumbo Tsuruta (c) vs. Blackjack Lanza for the AWA World Heavyweight Championship
AWA	Nick Bockwinkel vs. Mad Dog Vachon; December 25, 1983	St. Paul, Minnesota	St. Paul Civic Center	17,857	Nick Bockwinkel (c) vs. Mad Dog Vachon for the AWA World Heavyweight Championship
AWA	The Crusher vs. Jerry Blackwell; August 17, 1980	St. Paul, Minnesota	St. Paul Civic Center	17,000	The Crusher vs. Jerry Blackwell in a Lights Out match
AWA	Baron Von Raschke, Dick the Bruiser & The Crusher vs. Masa Saito, Jesse Ventura & Jerry Blackwell; April 29, 1984	Rosemont, Illinois	Rosemont Horizon	17,000	Baron Von Raschke, Dick the Bruiser and The Crusher vs. Masa Saito, Jesse Ventura and Jerry Blackwell in a Steel Cage match
AWA	Tony Atlas vs. Masa Saito; October 21, 1984	St. Paul, Minnesota	St. Paul Civic Center	17,000	Tony Atlas vs. Masa Saito
AWA	Rick Martel vs. Billy Robinson; November 22, 1984	St. Paul, Minnesota	St. Paul Civic Center	16,000	Rick Martel (c) vs. Billy Robinson for the AWA World Heavyweight Championship
AWA	Verne Gagne Retirement Show (Day 1); May 10, 1981	St. Paul, Minnesota	St. Paul Civic Center	15,780	Verne Gagne (c) vs. Nick Bockwinkel for the AWA World Heavyweight Championship
AWA	Blackjack Lanza & Bobby Duncum vs. Dick the Bruiser & The Crusher; August 27, 1976	Chicago, Illinois	Comiskey Park	15,000	Blackjack Lanza and Bobby Duncum (c) vs. Dick the Bruiser and The Crusher in a Steel Cage match for the AWA World Tag Team Championship
AWA	Nick Bockwinkel vs. Hulk Hogan; June 20, 1982	St. Paul, Minnesota	St. Paul Civic Center	15,000	Nick Bockwinkel (c) vs. Hulk Hogan for the AWA World Heavyweight Championship
AWA	Nick Bockwinkel vs. Brad Rheingans; September 25, 1983	St. Paul, Minnesota	St. Paul Civic Center	15,000	Nick Bockwinkel (c) vs. Brad Rheingans for the AWA World Heavyweight Championship
AWA	Dick the Bruiser & The Blackjacks vs. Ken Patera, Jerry Blackwell & Sheik Adnan Al-Kaissey; April 1, 1984	Rosemont, Illinois	Rosemont Horizon	14,250	Dick the Bruiser and The Blackjacks (Blackjack Mulligan and Blackjack Lanza) vs. Ken Patera, Jerry Blackwell and Sheik Adnan Al-Kaissey
AWA	Nick Bockwinkel vs. Wahoo McDaniel; June 26, 1983	St. Paul, Minnesota	St. Paul Civic Center	14,000	Nick Bockwinkel (c) vs. Wahoo McDaniel for the AWA World Heavyweight Championship
AWA	The Crusher vs. Jerry Blackwell; February 26, 1984	St. Paul, Minnesota	St. Paul Civic Center	14,000	The Crusher vs. Jerry Blackwell in a No Disqualification match
AWA	Nick Bockwinkel vs. Mad Dog Vachon; November 24, 1983	St. Paul, Minnesota	St. Paul Civic Center	13,163	Nick Bockwinkel (c) vs. Mad Dog Vachon for the AWA World Heavyweight Championship
AWA	Rick Martel vs. Jim Garvin; December 25, 1984	St. Paul, Minnesota	St. Paul Civic Center	13,000	Rick Martel (c) vs. Jim Garvin for the AWA World Heavyweight Championship
AWA	Jerry Blackwell & The Road Warriors vs. The Fabulous Freebirds; January 10, 1986	Rosemont, Illinois	Rosemont Horizon	13,000	Jerry Blackwell and The Road Warriors (Road Warrior Hawk and Road Warrior Animal) vs. The Fabulous Freebirds (Terry Gordy, Michael Hayes and Buddy Roberts) in a Steel Cage match
AWA	André the Giant and Ray Stevens vs. The Heenan Family; October 21, 1982	Winnipeg, Manitoba	Winnipeg Arena	12,512	André the Giant and Ray Stevens defeated The Heenan Family (Ken Patera and Bobby Heenan)
AWA / JCP	Rick Martel vs. Kamala; November 24, 1985	Baltimore, Maryland	Baltimore Civic Center	12,500	Rick Martel vs. Kamala for the AWA World Heavyweight Championship
AWA	The Crusher vs. Angelo Mosca; April 1, 1978	Milwaukee, Wisconsin	MECCA Arena	12,308	The Crusher vs. Angelo Mosca in a Steel Cage match

== Historical ==
Top 10 most-attended shows in the 1930s
No.	Promotion	Event	Location	Venue	Attendance	Main Event(s)
1.	MBWC	Jim Londos vs. Ray Steele; March 19, 1935	Minneapolis, Minnesota	Minneapolis Auditorium	10,000	Jim Londos (c) vs. Ray Steele for the NWA World Heavyweight Championship
1.	MBWC	Jim Londos vs. Ray Steele; April 30, 1935	Minneapolis, Minnesota	Minneapolis Auditorium	10,000	Jim Londos (c) vs. Ray Steele for the NWA World Heavyweight Championship
1.	MBWC	Bronko Nagurski vs. Dick Raines; April 20, 1937	Minneapolis, Minnesota	Minneapolis Auditorium	10,000	Bronko Nagurski vs. Dick Raines
2.	MBWC	Bronko Nagurski vs. Hans Kaempfer; June 7, 1938	Minneapolis, Minnesota	Minneapolis Auditorium	9,041	Bronko Nagurski (c) vs. Hans Kaempfer for the World Heavyweight Championship
2.	MBWC	Bronko Nagurski vs. Gino Vagnone; July 12, 1938	Minneapolis, Minnesota	Minneapolis Auditorium	9,041	Bronko Nagurski (c) vs. Gino Vagnone for the World Heavyweight Championship
3.	MBWC	Bronko Nagurski vs. Otto Kuss; July 11, 1937	Waterloo, Iowa	Electric Park Arena	9,000	Bronko Nagurski (c) vs. Otto Kuss for the World Heavyweight Championship
4.	MBWC	Jim Londos vs. Abe Kashey; March 6, 1934	Minneapolis, Minnesota	Minneapolis Auditorium	8,500	Jim Londos (c) vs. Abe Kashey for the NWA World Heavyweight Championship
4.	MBWC	Bronko Nagurski vs. Farmer Tobin; June 30, 1936	Minneapolis, Minnesota	Minneapolis Auditorium	8,500	Bronko Nagurski vs. Farmer Tobin
5.	MBWC	Pat O'Shocker vs. Abe Kashey; January 29, 1934	Minneapolis, Minnesota	Minneapolis Auditorium	8,000	Pat O'Shocker vs. Abe Kashey
5.	MBWC	Abe Kashey vs. Charley Retzlaff; October 9, 1934	Minneapolis, Minnesota	Minneapolis Auditorium	8,000	Abe Kashey vs. Charley Retzlaff in a Boxer vs. Wrestler match with special referee Jack Dempsey
5.	MBWC	Jim Londos vs. Abe Coleman; January 22, 1935	Minneapolis, Minnesota	Minneapolis Auditorium	8,000	Jim Londos (c) vs. Abe Coleman for the NWA World Heavyweight Championship
5.	MBWC	Dean Detton vs. Bronko Nagurski; June 29, 1937	Minneapolis, Minnesota	Minneapolis Auditorium	8,000	Dean Detton (c) vs. Bronko Nagurski for the World Heavyweight Championship
5.	MBWC	Bronko Nagurski vs. Dick Raines; September 7, 1937	Minneapolis, Minnesota	Minneapolis Auditorium	8,000	Bronko Nagurski vs. Dick Raines
6.	MBWC	Ray Steele vs. Ed Lewis; April 2, 1935	Minneapolis, Minnesota	Minneapolis Auditorium	7,000	Ray Steele vs. Ed "Strangler" Lewis
6.	MBWC	Danno O'Mahoney vs. Ray Steele; September 17, 1935	Minneapolis, Minnesota	Minneapolis Auditorium	7,000	Danno O'Mahoney (c) vs. Ray Steele for the NWA World Heavyweight Championship
6.	MBWC	Hans Kaempfer vs. Dick Raines; June 8, 1937	Minneapolis, Minnesota	Minneapolis Auditorium	7,000	Hans Kaempfer vs. Dick Raines
6.	MBWC	Bronko Nagurski vs. Paul Jones; February 1, 1938	Minneapolis, Minnesota	Minneapolis Auditorium	7,000	Bronko Nagurski (c) vs. Paul Jones for the World Heavyweight Championship
7.	MBWC	Bronko Nagurski vs. Abe Coleman; March 5, 1935	Minneapolis, Minnesota	Minneapolis Auditorium	6,500	Bronko Nagurski vs. Abe Coleman
8.	MBWC	Danno O'Mahoney vs. Paul Jones; November 11, 1935	Minneapolis, Minnesota	Minneapolis Auditorium	6,000	Danno O'Mahoney (c) vs. Paul Jones for the NWA World Heavyweight Championship
8.	MBWC	Lou Plummer vs. Frank Speer; January 13, 1936	Minneapolis, Minnesota	Minneapolis Auditorium	6,000	Lou Plummer vs. Frank Speer
8.	MBWC	Lou Plummer vs. Farmer Tobin; March 3, 1936	Minneapolis, Minnesota	Minneapolis Auditorium	6,000	Lou Plummer vs. Farmer Tobin
8.	MBWC	Bronko Nagurski vs. Ray Steele; January 4, 1938	Minneapolis, Minnesota	Minneapolis Auditorium	6,000	Bronko Nagurski (c) vs. Ray Steele for the World Heavyweight Championship
8.	MBWC	Jim Londos vs. Ray Steele; March 22, 1938	Minneapolis, Minnesota	Minneapolis Auditorium	6,000	Jim Londos vs. Ray Steele
8.	MBWC	Bronko Nagurski vs. Ali Baba; May 9, 1939	Minneapolis, Minnesota	Minneapolis Auditorium	6,000	Bronko Nagurski vs. Ali Baba
8.	MBWC	Bronko Nagurski vs. Chief Saunooke; October 10, 1939	Minneapolis, Minnesota	Minneapolis Auditorium	6,000	Bronko Nagurski (c) vs. Chief Saunooke for the NWA World Heavyweight Championship
9.	FKE / MBWC	Bronko Nagurski vs. Fritz Von Schacht; February 8, 1938	Chicago, Illinois	Chicago Stadium	5,081	Bronko Nagurski (c) vs. Fritz Von Schacht for the World Heavyweight Championship
10.	MBWC	Jim Londos vs. Joe Cox; June 13, 1933	Minneapolis, Minnesota	Minneapolis Auditorium	5,000	Jim Londos vs. Joe Cox
10.	MBWC	Milo Steinborn vs. George Koverly; July 22, 1934	Waterloo, Iowa	Electric Park Arena	5,000	Milo Steinborn vs. George Koverly
10.	MBWC	Abe Coleman vs. Abe Kashey; January 8, 1935	Minneapolis, Minnesota	Minneapolis Auditorium	5,000	Abe Coleman vs. Abe Kashey
10.	MBWC	Bronko Nagurski vs. Lou Plummer; June 18, 1935	Minneapolis, Minnesota	Minneapolis Auditorium	5,000	Bronko Nagurski vs. Lou Plummer
10.	MBWC	Danno O'Mahoney vs. Lou Plummer; July 16, 1935	Minneapolis, Minnesota	Minneapolis Auditorium	5,000	Danno O'Mahoney (c) vs. Lou Plummer for the NWA World Heavyweight Championship
10.	MBWC	Lou Plummer vs. Otto Kuss; January 7, 1936	Minneapolis, Minnesota	Minneapolis Auditorium	5,000	Lou Plummer vs. Otto Kuss
10.	MBWC	Jim Londos vs. Cliff Olson; February 18, 1936	Minneapolis, Minnesota	Minneapolis Auditorium	5,000	Jim Londos vs. Cliff Olson
10.	MBWC	Farmer Tobin vs. Dick Raines; February 9, 1937	Minneapolis, Minnesota	Minneapolis Auditorium	5,000	Farmer Tobin vs. Dick Raines
10.	MBWC	Bronko Nagurski vs. Ed Lewis; May 25, 1937	Minneapolis, Minnesota	Minneapolis Auditorium	5,000	Bronko Nagurski vs. Ed "Strangler" Lewis
10.	MBWC	Hans Kaempfer vs. Chief Little Wolf; April 26, 1938	Minneapolis, Minnesota	Minneapolis Auditorium	5,000	Hans Kaempfer vs. Chief Little Wolf
10.	MBWC	Bronko Nagurski vs. Hans Kaempfer; November 29, 1938	Minneapolis, Minnesota	Minneapolis Auditorium	5,000	Bronko Nagurski vs. Hans Kaempfer
10.	MBWC	Bronko Nagurski vs. Dick Raines; June 28, 1939	Minneapolis, Minnesota	Minneapolis Auditorium	5,000	Bronko Nagurski (c) vs. Dick Raines for the NWA World Heavyweight Championship

Top 10 most-attended shows in the 1940s
No.	Promotion	Event	Location	Venue	Attendance	Main Event(s)
1.	MBWC	Ray Steele vs. Bronko Nagurski; March 11, 1941	Minneapolis, Minnesota	Minneapolis Auditorium	8,000	Ray Steele (c) vs. Bronko Nagurski for the NWA World Heavyweight Championship
2.	MBWC	Sandor Szabo vs. Cliff Gustafson; July 1, 1941	Minneapolis, Minnesota	Minneapolis Auditorium	7,000	Sandor Szabo (c) vs. Cliff Gustafson for the NWA World Heavyweight Championship
3.	MBWC	Bronko Nagurski vs. Cliff Gustafson; January 27, 1942	Minneapolis, Minnesota	Minneapolis Auditorium	6,500	Bronko Nagurski vs. Cliff Gustafson
4.	MBWC	Cliff Gustafson vs. Abe Kashey; May 29, 1945	Minneapolis, Minnesota	Minneapolis Auditorium	6,000	Cliff Gustafson vs. Abe Kashey
5.	MBWC	Bronko Nagurski vs. Bob Wagner; November 29, 1949	Minneapolis, Minnesota	Minneapolis Auditorium	5,326	Bronko Nagurski vs. Bob Wagner
6.	MBWC	Bronko Nagurski vs. Ernie Dusek; January 9, 1940	Minneapolis, Minnesota	Minneapolis Auditorium	5,000	Bronko Nagurski (c) vs. Ernie Dusek for the NWA World Heavyweight Championship
6.	MBWC	Bronko Nagurski vs. Danno O'Mahoney; February 6, 1940	Minneapolis, Minnesota	Minneapolis Auditorium	5,000	Bronko Nagurski (c) vs. Danno O'Mahoney for the NWA World Heavyweight Championship
6.	MBWC	Bronko Nagurski vs. Ed Virag; April 30, 1940	Minneapolis, Minnesota	Minneapolis Auditorium	5,000	Bronko Nagurski vs. Ed Virag
6.	MBWC	Bronko Nagurski vs. Lou Thesz; May 7, 1940	Minneapolis, Minnesota	Minneapolis Auditorium	5,000	Bronko Nagurski vs. Lou Thesz
6.	MBWC	The French Angel vs. Alf Johnson; June 7, 1940	Minneapolis, Minnesota	Minneapolis Auditorium	5,000	The French Angel vs. Alf Johnson
6.	MBWC	Bronko Nagurski vs. Sandor Szabo; May 26, 1942	Minneapolis, Minnesota	Minneapolis Auditorium	5,000	Bronko Nagurski vs. Sandor Szabo
6.	MBWC	Bronko Nagurski vs. Steve Casey; January 20, 1948	Minneapolis, Minnesota	Minneapolis Auditorium	5,000	Bronko Nagurski vs. Steve Casey
6.	MBWC	George Gordienko vs. Mike Browning; February 3, 1948	Minneapolis, Minnesota	Minneapolis Auditorium	5,000	George Gordienko vs. Mike Browning
6.	MBWC	Orville Brown vs. Bronko Nagurski; June 14, 1949	Minneapolis, Minnesota	Minneapolis Auditorium	5,000	Orville Brown (c) vs. Bronko Nagurski for the NWA World Heavyweight Championship
7.	MBWC	Bronko Nagurski vs. Bill Longson; December 27, 1949	Minneapolis, Minnesota	Minneapolis Auditorium	4,623	Bronko Nagurski vs. Bill Longson
8.	MBWC	Bronko Nagurski vs. Ray Steele; June 5, 1945	Minneapolis, Minnesota	Minneapolis Auditorium	4,500	Bronko Nagurski vs. Ray Steele
9.	MBWC	Midwest Wrestling tournament February 20, 1940	Minneapolis, Minnesota	Minneapolis Auditorium	4,000	16-man Midwest Wrestling tournament
9.	MBWC	Sandor Szabo vs. Billy Bartush; April 28, 1942	Minneapolis, Minnesota	Minneapolis Auditorium	4,000	Sandor Szabo vs. Billy Bartush
9.	MBWC	George Gordienko vs. Dave Levin; January 6, 1948	Minneapolis, Minnesota	Minneapolis Auditorium	4,000	George Gordienko vs. Dave Levin
10.	MBWC	Steve Kozak vs. Joe Pazandak; November 21, 1946	Winnipeg, Manitoba	Civic Auditorium	3,800	Steve Kozak vs. Joe Pazandak

Top 10 most-attended shows in the 1950s
No.	Promotion	Event	Location	Venue	Attendance	Main Event(s)
1.	MBWC	Abe Kashey vs. Dick Raines; March 23, 1954	Minneapolis, Minnesota	Minneapolis Auditorium	9,990	Abe Kashey vs. Dick Raines with special referee Joe Louis
2.	MBWC	Yukon Eric vs. Hard Boiled Haggerty; July 14, 1953	Minneapolis, Minnesota	Minneapolis Auditorium	9,641	Yukon Eric vs. Hard Boiled Haggerty
3.	MBWC	Tiny Mills vs. Hard Boiled Haggerty; October 28, 1952	Minneapolis, Minnesota	Minneapolis Auditorium	9,400	Tiny Mills vs. Hard Boiled Haggerty
3.	MBWC	Yukon Eric vs. Ski Hi Lee; May 5, 1953	Minneapolis, Minnesota	Minneapolis Auditorium	9,400	Yukon Eric vs. Ski Hi Lee
4.	MBWC	The Kalmikoffs vs. Lord Layton & Bobby Managoff; March 6, 1956	Minneapolis, Minnesota	Minneapolis Auditorium	9,250	The Kalmikoffs (Ivan Kalmikoff and Karol Kalmikoff) vs. Lord Layton and Bobby Managoff
5.	MBWC	Ike Eakins vs Hard Boiled Haggerty; March 17, 1953	Minneapolis, Minnesota	Minneapolis Armory	9,238	Ike Eakins vs Hard Boiled Haggerty
6.	MBWC	Bronko Nagurski vs. Lou Thesz; June 26, 1951	Minneapolis, Minnesota	Minneapolis Auditorium	9,146	Bronko Nagurski vs. Lou Thesz
7.	MBWC	Bronko Nagurski vs. Hard Boiled Haggerty; August 19, 1952	Minneapolis, Minnesota	Minneapolis Auditorium	9,120	Bronko Nagurski vs. Hard Boiled Haggerty
8.	MBWC	Verne Gagne & Paul Baillargeon vs. Tiny Mills & Dick Raines; July 22, 1952	Minneapolis, Minnesota	Minneapolis Auditorium	9,000	Verne Gagne and Paul Baillargeon vs. Tiny Mills and Dick Raines in a Best 2-out-of-3 Falls match
9.	MBWC	Butch Levy vs. Dick Raines; January 31, 1950	Minneapolis, Minnesota	Minneapolis Auditorium	8,934	Butch Levy vs. Dick Raines with special referee Jack Dempsey
10.	MBWC	Bronko Nagurski vs. Wladek Kowalski; May 2, 1950	Minneapolis, Minnesota	Minneapolis Auditorium	8,917	Bronko Nagurski vs. Wladek Kowalski

Top 10 most-attended shows in the 1960s
No.	Promotion	Event	Location	Venue	Attendance	Main Event(s)
1.	AWA	Verne Gagne vs. Blackjack Lanza; July 27, 1968	Chicago, Illinois	International Amphitheater	12,108	Verne Gagne (c) vs. Blackjack Lanza for the AWA World Heavyweight Championship
2.	AWA	Larry Hennig & Harley Race vs. Dick the Bruiser & The Crusher; April 15, 1967	Chicago, Illinois	International Amphitheater	11,425	Larry Hennig and Harley Race (c) vs. Dick the Bruiser and The Crusher for the AWA World Tag Team Championship
3.	AWA	Lars Anderson vs. Bill Watts; April 10, 1969	Milwaukee, Wisconsin	Milwaukee Arena	11,308	Lars Anderson vs. Bill Watts
4.	AWA	Dick the Bruiser & The Crusher vs. Larry Hennig & Harley Race; January 17, 1965	St. Paul, Minnesota	St. Paul Auditorium	10,993	Dick the Bruiser and The Crusher (c) vs. Larry Hennig and Harley Race in a Best 2-out-of-3 Falls match for the AWA World Heavyweight Championship
5.	AWA	The Crusher vs. Verne Gagne; February 15, 1963	St. Paul, Minnesota	St. Paul Auditorium	10,802	The Crusher vs. Verne Gagne in a Death match
6.	AWA	Verne Gagne vs. Gene Kiniski; November 24, 1960	St. Paul, Minnesota	St. Paul Auditorium	10,661	Verne Gagne (c) vs. Gene Kiniski for the AWA World Heavyweight Championship
7.	AWA	Dick the Bruiser & Bobby Heenan vs. The Chain Gang; June 21, 1969	Chicago, Illinois	International Amphitheater	10,000	Dick the Bruiser and Bobby Heenan vs. The Chain Gang (Frank Dillinger and Jack Dillinger) in a Best 2-out-of-3 Falls match
7.	AWA	Verne Gagne vs. Bill Watts; July 26, 1969	Chicago, Illinois	International Amphitheater	10,000	Verne Gagne (c) vs. Bill Watts in a Best 2-out-of-3 Falls match for the AWA World Heavyweight Championship
7.	AWA	Dick the Bruiser & The Crusher vs. The Vachons; August 30, 1969	Chicago, Illinois	International Amphitheater	10,000	Dick the Bruiser and The Crusher (c) vs. The Vachons (Mad Dog Vachon and Butcher Vachon) in a Best 2-out-of-3 Falls match for the AWA World Tag Team Championship
7.	AWA	The Vachons vs. Pat O'Connor & Wilbur Snyder; September 13, 1969	Chicago, Illinois	International Amphitheatre	10,000	The Vachons (Mad Dog Vachon and Butcher Vachon) vs. Pat O'Connor and Wilbur Snyder in a Best 2-out-of-3 Falls match
7.	AWA	The Vachons vs. Edouard Carpentier & Wilbur Snyder; September 27, 1969	Chicago, Illinois	International Amphitheatre	10,000	The Vachons (Butcher Vachon and Mad Dog Vachon) (c) vs. Edouard Carpentier and Wilbur Snyder in a Best 2-out-of-3 Falls match for the AWA World Tag Team Championship
7.	AWA	The Vachons vs. Red Bastien & Billy Red Lyons; October 11, 1969	Chicago, Illinois	International Amphitheater	10,000	The Vachons (Mad Dog Vachon and Butcher Vachon) (c) vs. Red Bastien and Billy Red Lyons in a Best 2-out-of-3 Falls match for the AWA World Tag Team Championship
7.	AWA	The Vachons vs. Red Bastien & Billy Red Lyons; November 8, 1969	Chicago, Illinois	International Amphitheater	10,000	The Vachons (Mad Dog Vachon and Butcher Vachon) (c) vs. Red Bastien and Billy Red Lyons in a Best 2-out-of-3 Falls match for the AWA World Tag Team Championship
7.	AWA	12-man Battle Royal; November 22, 1969	Chicago, Illinois	International Amphitheater	10,000	12-man Battle Royal
8.	AWA	Larry Hennig & Harley Race vs. Dick the Bruiser & The Crusher; March 11, 1967	Chicago, Illinois	International Amphitheater	9,812	Larry Hennig and Harley Race (c) vs. Dick the Bruiser and The Crusher for the AWA World Tag Team Championship
9.	AWA	Mad Dog Vachon vs. Verne Gagne; June 26, 1965	Minneapolis, Minnesota	Minneapolis Auditorium	9,713	Mad Dog Vachon (c) vs. Verne Gagne in a Best 2-out-of-3 Falls match for the AWA World Heavyweight Championship
10.	AWA	Dick the Bruiser & The Crusher vs. The Vachons; July 12, 1969	Milwaukee, Wisconsin	Milwaukee Arena	9,512	Dick the Bruiser and The Crusher (c) vs. The Vachons (Mad Dog Vachon and Butcher Vachon) in a Best 2-out-of-3 Falls match for the AWA World Tag Team Championship

Top 10 most-attended shows in the 1970s
No.	Promotion	Event	Location	Venue	Attendance	Main Event(s)
1.	AWA	Verne Gagne vs. Baron Von Raschke; August 14, 1970	Chicago, Illinois	Comiskey Park	21,000	Verne Gagne (c) vs. Baron Von Raschke in a Best 2-out-of-3 Falls match for the AWA World Heavyweight Championship
2.	AWA	Verne Gagne vs. Billy Robinson; September 7, 1974	Chicago, Illinois	Comiskey Park	18,000	Verne Gagne (c) vs. Billy Robinson for the AWA World Heavyweight Championship
3.	AWA	Blackjack Lanza & Bobby Duncum vs. Dick the Bruiser & The Crusher; August 27, 1976	Chicago, Illinois	Comiskey Park	15,000	Blackjack Lanza and Bobby Duncum (c) vs. Dick the Bruiser and The Crusher in a Steel Cage match for the AWA World Tag Team Championship
4.	AWA	The Crusher vs. Angelo Mosca; April 1, 1978	Milwaukee, Wisconsin	MECCA Arena	12,308	The Crusher vs. Angelo Mosca in a Steel Cage match
5.	AWA	The Crusher vs. Nick Bockwinkel; October 9, 1971	Milwaukee, Wisconsin	Milwaukee Arena	12,300	The Crusher vs. Nick Bockwinkel
5.	AWA	The Crusher & Mad Dog Vachon vs. Billy Graham & Ivan Koloff; September 29, 1973	Milwaukee, Wisconsin	Milwaukee Arena	12,300	The Crusher and Mad Dog Vachon vs. Billy Graham and Ivan Koloff in a Steel Cage match
6.	AWA	The Crusher vs. Mad Dog Vachon; June 13, 1970	Milwaukee, Wisconsin	Milwaukee Arena	12,076	The Crusher vs. Mad Dog Vachon in a Steel Cage match
7.	AWA	The Crusher vs. Dusty Rhodes; June 17, 1972	Milwaukee, Wisconsin	Milwaukee Arena	12,062	The Crusher vs. Dusty Rhodes in a Saloon match
8.	AWA	Dick the Bruiser & The Crusher vs. The Chain Gang; June 2, 1970	Chicago, Illinois	International Amphitheater	12,000	Dick the Bruiser and The Crusher vs. The Chain Gang (Jim Dillinger and Jack Dillinger) in a Best 2-out-of-3 Falls match
8.	AWA	Dick the Bruiser & The Crusher vs. The Blackjacks; September 1, 1972	Chicago, Illinois	Soldier Field	12,000	Dick the Bruiser and The Crusher vs. The Blackjacks (Blackjack Mulligan and Blackjack Lanza) in a Steel Cage match with special referee Jersey Joe Walcott
8.	AWA	Nick Bockwinkel & Ray Stevens vs. Dick the Bruiser & The Crusher; August 16, 1975	Chicago, Illinois	International Amphitheater	12,000	Nick Bockwinkel and Ray Stevens (c) vs. Dick the Bruiser and The Crusher in a Best 2-out-of-3 Falls match for the AWA World Tag Team Championship
8.	AWA	Nick Bockwinkel vs. Verne Gagne; December 3, 1977	Chicago, Illinois	International Amphitheater	12,000	Nick Bockwinkel (c) vs. Verne Gagne for the AWA World Heavyweight Championship
9.	AWA	Nick Bockwinkel & Ray Stevens vs. Dick the Bruiser & The Crusher; August 19, 1972	Milwaukee, Wisconsin	Milwaukee Arena	11,951	Nick Bockwinkel and Ray Stevens (c) vs. Dick the Bruiser and The Crusher in a Best 2-out-of-3 Falls match for the AWA World Tag Team Championship
10.	AWA	André the Giant & The High Flyers vs. The Heenan Family; March 18, 1976	Winnipeg, Manitoba	Winnipeg Arena	11,500	André the Giant and The High Flyers (Greg Gagne and Jim Brunzell) vs. The Heenan Family (Nick Bockwinkel, Bobby Duncum and Bobby Heenan)
10.	AWA	Dick the Bruiser vs. Ernie Ladd; March 11, 1978	Chicago, Illinois	International Amphitheater	11,500	Dick the Bruiser vs. Ernie Ladd in a Texas Death match

Top 10 most-attended shows in the 1980s
No.	Promotion	Event	Location	Venue	Attendance	Main Event(s)
1.	AWA	WrestleRock 86; April 20, 1986	Minneapolis, Minnesota	Hubert H. Humphrey Metrodome	23,000	The Road Warriors (Road Warrior Animal and Road Warrior Hawk) vs. The Fabulous Freebirds (Michael Hayes and Jimmy Garvin) in a Steel Cage match
2.	AWA	SuperClash; September 28, 1985	Chicago, Illinois	Comiskey Park	20,347	Rick Martel (c) vs. Stan Hansen for the AWA World Heavyweight Championship
3.	AWA	The Road Warriors vs. The Crusher & Stan Lane; August 30, 1984	Chicago, Illinois	Comiskey Park	20,000 (Note: The event took place after a Chicago White Sox vs. Toronto Blue Jays baseball game.)	The Road Warriors (Road Warrior Hawk and Road Warrior Animal) (c) vs. The Crusher and Stan Lane for the AWA World Tag Team Championship
3.	AWA	AWA Super Sunday; April 24, 1983	St. Paul, Minnesota	St. Paul Civic Center	20,000	Nick Bockwinkel (c) vs. Hulk Hogan for the AWA World Heavyweight Championship
3.	AWA	20-Man Battle Royal; October 23, 1983	St. Paul, Minnesota	St. Paul Civic Center	19,120	20-man Battle Royal match
4.	AWA	The Crusher & Greg Gagne vs. Sheik Adnan Al-Kaissey & Jerry Blackwell; March 25, 1984	St. Paul, Minnesota	St. Paul Civic Center	19,000	The Crusher and Greg Gagne vs. Sheik Adnan Al-Kaissey and Jerry Blackwell in a Steel Cage match
5.	AWA	Nick Bockwinkel vs. Hulk Hogan; April 18, 1982	St. Paul, Minnesota	St. Paul Civic Center	18,969	Nick Bockwinkel (c) vs. Hulk Hogan for the AWA World Heavyweight Championship
6.	AWA	Hulk Hogan & The High Flyers vs. Crusher Blackwell, Ken Patera & Sheik Adnan Al-Kaissey; November 4, 1983	Rosemont, Illinois	Rosemont Horizon	18,500	Hulk Hogan and The High Flyers (Greg Gagne and Jim Brunzell) vs. Crusher Blackwell, Ken Patera and Sheik Adnan Al-Kaissey
7.	AWA	Nick Bockwinkel vs. Rick Martel; November 25, 1982	St. Paul, Minnesota	St. Paul Civic Center	18,000	Nick Bockwinkel (c) vs. Rick Martel for the AWA World Heavyweight Championship
7.	AWA	Jumbo Tsuruta vs. Blackjack Lanza; March 4, 1984	Rosemont, Illinois	Rosemont Horizon	18,000	Jumbo Tsuruta (c) vs. Blackjack Lanza for the AWA World Heavyweight Championship
7.	AWA	The Crusher & Baron Von Raschke vs Mr. Saito & Jesse Ventura; April 1, 1984	Rosemont, Illinois	Rosemont Horizon	18,000	The Crusher and Baron Von Raschke vs Mr. Saito and Jesse Ventura
8.	AWA	Nick Bockwinkel vs. Mad Dog Vachon; December 25, 1983	St. Paul, Minnesota	St. Paul Civic Center	17,857	Nick Bockwinkel (c) vs. Mad Dog Vachon for the AWA World Heavyweight Championship
9.	AWA	The Crusher vs. Jerry Blackwell; August 17, 1980	St. Paul, Minnesota	St. Paul Civic Center	17,000	The Crusher vs. Jerry Blackwell in a Lights Out match
9.	AWA	Baron Von Raschke, Dick the Bruiser & The Crusher vs. Masa Saito, Jesse Ventura & Jerry Blackwell; April 29, 1984	Rosemont, Illinois	Rosemont Horizon	17,000	Baron Von Raschke, Dick the Bruiser and The Crusher vs. Masa Saito, Jesse Ventura and Jerry Blackwell in a Steel Cage match
9.	AWA	Tony Atlas vs. Masa Saito; October 21, 1984	St. Paul, Minnesota	St. Paul Civic Center	17,000	Tony Atlas vs. Masa Saito
10.	AWA	Rick Martel vs. Billy Robinson; November 22, 1984	St. Paul, Minnesota	St. Paul Civic Center	16,000	Rick Martel (c) vs. Billy Robinson for the AWA World Heavyweight Championship

Top 5 most-attended shows in the 1990s
No.	Promotion	Event	Location	Venue	Attendance	Main Event(s)
1.	AWA / NWA	Twin Wars '90; May 5, 1990	St. Paul, Minnesota	St. Paul Civic Center	4,000	Larry Zbyszko vs. Nikita Koloff for the AWA World Heavyweight Championship with special guest referee Nick Bockwinkel
2.	AWA	SuperClash IV; April 8, 1990	St. Paul, Minnesota	St. Paul Civic Center	2,000	Mr. Saito (c) vs. Larry Zbyszko for the AWA World Heavyweight Championship with special guest referee Nick Bockwinkel
3.	AWA	All Star Wrestling; January 22, 1994	Red Wing, Minnesota	Treasure Island Resort & Casino	700	Larry Zbyszko vs. Repo Man
4.	AWA	Wahoo McDaniel & Greg Gagne vs. The Destruction Crew; May 3, 1991	Bloomington, Minnesota	Bloomington Kennedy High School	650	Wahoo McDaniel and Greg Gagne vs. The Destruction Crew (Mike Enos and Wayne Bloom)
5.	AWA	Wahoo McDaniel & Baron Von Raschke vs. The Destruction Crew; May 2, 1991	Bemidji, Minnesota		450	Wahoo McDaniel and Baron Von Raschke vs. The Destruction Crew (Mike Enos and Wayne Bloom)
