= SuperClash =

American Wrestling Association event series

- Promotions: American Wrestling Association
- First event: SuperClash (1985)
- Last event: SuperClash IV
- Event gimmick: AWA's flagship event

SuperClash was a series of major professional wrestling shows promoted by the American Wrestling Association (AWA) between 1983 (the first event was known as Super Sunday) and 1990, often co-promoted with other North American wrestling promotions. AWA held a total of four SuperClash shows, with the third being broadcast on pay-per-view (PPV), AWA's only PPV show.

== Dates, venues and main events ==
Event	Date	City	Venue	Main Event	Ref(s)
SuperClash (1985)	September 28, 1985	Comiskey Park	Chicago, Illinois	Rick Martel (c) vs. Stan Hansen for the AWA World Heavyweight Championship	
SuperClash II	May 2, 1987	Cow Palace	San Francisco, California	Nick Bockwinkel (c) vs. Curt Hennig for the AWA World Heavyweight Championship	
SuperClash III	December 13, 1988	UIC Pavilion	Chicago, Illinois	Jerry Lawler (AWA) vs. Kerry Von Erich (WCCW) - AWA World Heavyweight Championship vs. WCWA World Heavyweight Championship match)	
SuperClash IV	April 8, 1990	Saint Paul Civic Center	Saint Paul, Minnesota	Mr. Saito (c) vs. Larry Zbyszko for the AWA World Heavyweight Championship	
(c) – refers to the champion(s) heading into the match

== See also ==
- AWA on television
