= Warren Bockwinkel =

American professional wrestler

- A promotional photograph of Bockwinkel from the 1950s.

Personal information
- Born: May 21, 1911
- Died: March 25, 1986 (aged 74) St. Louis, Missouri, U.S.
- Children: Nick Bockwinkel

Professional wrestling career
- Ring name: Warren Bockwinkel
- Billed weight: 220 lb (100 kg)
- Billed from: St. Louis, Missouri
- Debut: 1934
- Retired: 1957

Warren Bockwinkel (often misspelled Bockwinkle, May 21, 1911 – March 25, 1986) was an American professional wrestler.

== Career ==
Bockwinkel was working as a truck driver for International Shoe Company in St. Louis, Missouri when he was introduced to professional wrestling by a small man he met in a bar who subsequently took him to a gym run by an individual named "Tregas". This Tregas was an experienced European wrestler who seemingly operated a wrestling training gym in St. Louis.

Bockwinkel competed in the National Wrestling Alliance and North American regional promotions during the 1930s, 1940s and 1950s. He was a "shoot-style" wrestler who started in St. Louis and who often played an “excellent middle of the card” role, wrestling primarily in preliminary matches, although he occasionally appeared in main events. One of the earliest wrestlers to appear on television, he teamed with many of the top wrestlers of the day including Ray Vilmer, Killer Kowalski and "Classy" Freddie Blassie. Although he never won a world title during his career, he was involved in many high-profile feuds including against Ernie Dusek, Paul Boesch, Sandor Szabo, George Zaharias and NWA World Heavyweight Champion Lou Thesz.

He was also the trainer of several wrestlers of the "Golden Age of Wrestling"-era including Wilbur Snyder and, along with Lou Thesz, his son Nick Bockwinkel who would eventually become a major star in the American Wrestling Association winning the AWA World Heavyweight Championship six times during the 1970s and 1980s.

By 1955, he had retired, only coming out of retirement for a match with Hans Schmidt on October 2, 1957. Bockwinkel was inducted into the George Tragos/Lou Thesz Professional Wrestling Hall of Fame in 2010.

It is said that Bockwinkel wrestled a match in 1983 at 72 years old but this is unverified.

== Personal life ==
A personal friend of promoter Lord James Blears, he convinced Blears to allow Nick Bockwinkel to compete in his NWA Hawaii territory and later teamed with his son during the early 1950s. His son, Nick, later acknowledged his father in his induction speeches for the Professional Wrestling Hall of Fame and Museum in 2003 and the WWE Hall of Fame in 2007.

== Death ==
Bockwinkel died on March 25, 1986.
