= SuperClash (1985) =

Professional wrestling show

SuperClash '85
- Promotion: American Wrestling Association
- Date: September 28, 1985
- City: Chicago, Illinois
- Venue: Comiskey Park
- Attendance: 20,347

Event chronology
← Previous; AWA Super Sunday	Next → WrestleRock 86

SuperClash chronology
← Previous; First	Next → SuperClash II

SuperClash '85 – The Night of Champions was the first SuperClash professional wrestling supercard event promoted by the American Wrestling Association (AWA). It was billed as AWA's flagship supercard, their biggest event of the year. The event was held at Comiskey Park in Chicago, Illinois on September 28, 1985, only a few months after WrestleMania, which was promoted by the rival World Wrestling Federation (WWF) promotion.

The show drew a paid attendance of 20,347, although it was announced as 25,000. SuperClash – Night of Champions was one of the co-promotional efforts by the AWA, and National Wrestling Alliance (NWA), to compete with the WWF's increasing national presence and popularity. The jointly promoted venture was known as Pro Wrestling USA. Reportedly, promoters Verne Gagne (AWA) and Jim Crockett (NWA) disputed the live gate for the show, with Crockett claiming $288,000 and Gagne claiming $200,000 was made. Due to the money dispute, several NWA stars set to appear on Gagne's upcoming AWA events were pulled, with some cards then cancelled altogether.

The show featured numerous championship matches including three world heavyweight championship matches. On the show, Mil Máscaras defended the IWA World Heavyweight Championship against Buddy Roberts, despite the fact that the International Wrestling Association had closed down in 1978. Since then, Mil Máscaras continued to defend the championship, basically as his own personal championship used to give an air of prestige to some of Mil Máscaras' matches. Also on the show the team of Jumbo Tsuruta, Giant Baba, and Genichiro Tenryu were billed as defending the Asian Six-Man Tag Team Championship, a championship that was never mentioned outside the promotional material for the SuperClash show. In the tenth match of the night it appeared as if The Fabulous Freebirds (Michael Hayes and Terry Gordy) defeated The Road Warriors (Hawk and Animal) to win the AWA World Tag Team Championship. During the match, Hayes used a set of Brass knuckles on Animal to win the match. Moments later, promoter Verne Gagne reviewed the instant replay and decided to give the championship back to the Road Warriors, disqualifying the Freebirds. In the semi-main event, Ric Flair successfully defended his NWA World Heavyweight Championship against Magnum T. A. The main event match between champion AWA World Heavyweight Champion Rick Martel and Stan Hansen only lasted a couple of minutes as the champion and the challenger fought first at ringside and then into the dugout of Comiskey Park, resulting in a double disqualification.

== Event ==
=== Preliminary matches ===
In the opening match, Steve Regal defended the AWA World Light Heavyweight Championship against Brad Rheingans. Rheingans hit an atomic drop on Regal and covered him for the pinfall but Jimmy Garvin distracted the referee, allowing Regal to pin Rheingans using a roll-up (grabbing the tights for leverage) to retain the title.

In the second bout, Candy Divine defended her AWA World Women's Championship against Sherri Martel. Near the end of the match, Sherri hit a clothesline, suplex and a diving splash on Divine then pinned her to win the title.

In the third bout, Mil Máscaras defended the IWA World Heavyweight Championship against Buddy Roberts. Mascaras hit a diving crossbody on Roberts and pinned him to retain the title.

In the fourth bout, the team of Greg Gagne, Scott Hall, and Curt Hennig competed against Ray Stevens, Nick Bockwinkel and Larry Zbyszko. After a back and forth match between the two teams, Hall powerslammed Stevens and pinned him.

In the fifth bout, Little Tokyo defended the NWA World Midget's Championship against Little T. Little Tokyo hit a double chop to Little T's throat and then pinned him.

In the sixth bout, Jumbo Tsuruta, Giant Baba and Genichiro Tenryu defended the "Asian Six-Man Tag Team Championship" against Harley Race, Bill Irwin and Scott Irwin. Baba hit Bill Irwin with a boot to the face and pinned him to retain the title.

In the seventh bout, Kerry Von Erich faced Jimmy Garvin. Von Erich missed a charge at Garvin and Garvin climbed to the top rope but Von Erich crotched him from the top and Garvin fell down and then Von Erich pinned. After the match, Precious berated Von Erich and Garvin attacked him but Von Erich applied an Iron Claw on Garvin to make him pass out.

In the eighth bout, The Russian Team (Krusher Khruschev, Ivan Koloff, and Nikita Koloff) defended the NWA World Six-Man Tag Team Championship against Crusher, Dick the Bruiser and Baron von Raschke. Baron initially made Ivan submit to a clawhold but the referee did not see the submission as he was busy in preventing other wrestlers from interfering. Nikita then hit Baron with a foreign object and Ivan pinned him to retain the titles.

The ninth bout was a Bodyslam match between Jerry Blackwell and Kamala with the winner to earn the prize of $10,000. Blackwell slammed Kamala to win the challenge. After the match, Kamala's manager Sheik Adnan Al-Kaissie attacked Blackwell with his sword and a bunch of wrestlers tried to make the save but they were hit with it as well. This led to Baron von Raschke making the save with a baseball bat.

In the tenth bout, The Road Warriors (Road Warrior Hawk and Road Warrior Animal) defended the AWA World Tag Team Championship against the Fabulous Freebirds (Michael Hayes and Terry Gordy). A brawl took place between Paul Ellering and Buddy Roberts at ringside. Animal hit a shoulder block to Gordy and covered him for the pinfall until Hayes broke it up by hitting a diving elbow drop from the middle rope allowing Gordy to pin Animal for the titles. However, this win was reversed due to the illegal man, Hayes, getting involved.

In the eleventh bout, Sgt. Slaughter defended the AWA America's Championship against Boris Zhukov. Zhukov loaded his elbow pad with a foreign object and hit Slaughter with it, thus forcing the referee to disqualify him. As a result, Slaughter retained the America's Championship.

In the penultimate match, Ric Flair defended the NWA World Heavyweight Championship against Magnum T. A.. Magnum tried to pin Flair with a cradle but Flair reversed it into his own cradle and grabbed Magnum's tights for the pinfall to retain the title.

In the main event, Rick Martel defended the AWA World Heavyweight Championship against Stan Hansen. Hansen attacked Martel with a chair before the match and then hit him with a chair again until the match finally started. Hansen and Martel began hitting each other with chairs, forcing the referee to end the match in a double disqualification, resulting in Martel retaining the title.

== Results ==
No.	Results	Stipulations	Times
1	Steve Regal (c) defeated Brad Rheingans	Singles match for the AWA World Light Heavyweight Championship	08:15
2	Sherri Martel defeated Candi Divine (c)	Singles match for the AWA World Women's Championship	11:45
3	Mil Máscaras (c) defeated Buddy Roberts	Singles match for the IWA World Heavyweight Championship	06:57
4	Greg Gagne, Scott Hall and Curt Hennig defeated Ray Stevens, Nick Bockwinkel and Larry Zbyszko	Six-man tag team match	12:30
5	Little Tokyo (c) defeated Little T	Singles match for the NWA World Midget's Championship	06:54
6	Jumbo Tsuruta, Giant Baba and Genichiro Tenryu (c) defeated Harley Race, Bill Irwin and Scott Irwin	Six-man tag team match for the Asian Six-Man Tag Team Championship	10:57
7	Kerry Von Erich defeated Jimmy Garvin (with Precious) by pinfall	Singles match	06:54
8	The Russian Team (Krusher Khruschev, Ivan Koloff and Nikita Koloff) (c) defeated Crusher, Dick the Bruiser and Baron von Raschke	Six-man tag team match for the NWA World Six-Man Tag Team Championship	08:54
9	Jerry Blackwell defeated Kamala (with Sheik Adnan Al-Kaissie)	$10,000 Body Slam match	09:54
10	The Road Warriors (Hawk and Animal) (c) defeated The Fabulous Freebirds (Michael Hayes and Terry Gordy) by disqualification	Tag team match for the AWA World Tag Team Championship	14:12
11	Sgt. Slaughter (c) defeated Boris Zukhov by disqualification	Singles match for the AWA America's Championship	09:34
12	Ric Flair (c) defeated Magnum T. A.	Singles match for the NWA World Heavyweight Championship	19:10
13	Rick Martel (c) vs. Stan Hansen ended in a double disqualification	Singles match for the AWA World Heavyweight Championship	02:30
(c) / – the champion(s) heading into the match

== See also ==
- 1985 in professional wrestling
