= WrestleRock =

Professional wrestling show

- The logo used when the show was televised
- Promotion: American Wrestling Association
- Date: April 20, 1986
- City: Minneapolis, Minnesota
- Venue: Hubert H. Humphrey Metrodome
- Attendance: 23,000

Event chronology
← Previous; SuperClash	Next → SuperClash II

WrestleRock was a professional wrestling supercard event promoted by the American Wrestling Association (AWA) that took place on April 20, 1986 in the Hubert H. Humphrey Metrodome in Minneapolis, Minnesota in the United States.

In June 2016, WrestleRock was added to the WWE Network.

== Background ==
The event was held at the Hubert H. Humphrey Metrodome in Minneapolis, Minnesota on Sunday April 20, 1986. The card was heavily promoted for months during weekly television programming. Although not as ambitious as the WWF's WrestleMania 2, the show was a reasonable success, drawing more fans than both of Jim Crockett Promotions' Crockett Cup shows combined.

WrestleRock would prove to be the final stadium show for the AWA.

=== WrestleRock Rumble ===
The promotions for the show included a music video shot in Las Vegas entitled the "WrestleRock Rumble" in a vein similar to "The Super Bowl Shuffle" from 1985. It featured different AWA talent "rapping" verses, including 60-year-old Verne Gagne reading his verse off a sheet. The video was parodied by the WWE online comedy show Are You Serious?, with co-host Road Dogg calling Nick Bockwinkel the best rapper of the bunch. It was then parodied as the "WrestleMania Rumble", featuring Brodus Clay, Yoshi Tatsu, Santino Marella and Puppet H doing rap verses to promote WrestleMania XXVIII.

== Results ==
No.	Results	Stipulations	Times
1	Brad Rheingans defeated Boris Zukhov	Singles match	08:31
2	Little Mr. T and Cowboy Lang defeated Lord Littlebrook and Little Tokyo	Tag team match with Gary Lumpkin as the special guest referee	10:01
3	Colonel DeBeers defeated Wahoo McDaniel by disqualification	Singles match	05:03
4	Buddy Rose and Doug Somers defeated The Midnight Rockers (Shawn Michaels and Marty Jannetty)	Tag team match	12:03
5	Tiger Mask defeated Buck Zumhofe	Singles match	10:55
6	Barry Windham and Mike Rotunda defeated The Fabulous Ones (Stan Lane and Steve Keirn)	Tag team match	14:01
7	Giant Baba defeated Bulldog Bob Brown	Singles match	8:28
8	Harley Race vs. Rick Martel ended in a double countout	Singles match	17:34
9	Sherri Martel defeated Luna Vachon, Joyce Grable, Kat LeRoux, Rose Divine, Taylor Thomas, Despina Montagas, Misty Blue Simmes, Debbie Combs, and Candi Divine	10-woman battle royal	10:00
10	Sgt. Slaughter (c) defeated Kamala (with Skandor Akbar) by disqualification	Singles match for the AWA America's Championship	09:54
11	Scott Hall and Curt Hennig (c) defeated the Long Ryders (Bill Irwin and Scott Irwin)	Tag team match for the AWA World Tag Team Championship	27:53
12	Scott LeDoux defeated Larry Zbyszko by disqualification	Boxing match with Larry Hennig as the special guest referee	12:19
13	Nick Bockwinkel defeated Stan Hansen (c) by disqualification	Singles match for the AWA World Heavyweight Championship	10:43
14	Greg Gagne and Jimmy Snuka defeated King Kong Brody and Nord the Barbarian	Steel Cage match	12:12
15	Verne Gagne defeated Sheik Adnan El Kassey	Steel Cage match	06:54
16	The Road Warriors (Animal and Hawk) (with Paul Ellering) defeated the Fabulous Freebirds (Jimmy Garvin and Michael Hayes)	Steel cage match	21:21
(c) / – the champion(s) heading into the match
