= SuperClash II =

Professional wrestling show

- Promotion: American Wrestling Association
- Date: May 2, 1987
- City: Daly City, California
- Venue: Cow Palace
- Attendance: 2,800

Event chronology
← Previous; WrestleRock 86	Next → SuperClash III

SuperClash chronology
← Previous; SuperClash I	Next → SuperClash III

SuperClash II was the second SuperClash professional wrestling supercard event produced by American Wrestling Association (AWA). The event took place at the Cow Palace in Daly City, California on May 2, 1987. The show was promoted as the AWA's most important show of the year. Unlike SuperClash I and SuperClash III, the second event featured mainly AWA wrestlers. While not the last match of the show the main event was a match between Curt Hennig and Nick Bockwinkel for the AWA World Heavyweight Championship, in which Hennig defeated Bockwinkel to capture his only world championship.

The show featured six additional matches that were taped for television and shown as part of the AWA's weekly television shows in subsequent weeks. The show was produced by San Francisco based Robert McWilliams Productions for the AWA.

== Event ==
The opening match of the event took place between Buck Zumhofe and Sheik Adnan Al-Kaissy. Kassie pinned Zumhofe with a roll-up in the corner.

Next, D.J. Peterson took on Super Ninja. Near the end of the match, Peterson got a sunset flip and covered Ninja in a small package for the pinfall but the fifteen minute time limit expired, resulting in the match ending in a time limit draw.

Next, Sherri Martel defended the World Women's Championship against Madusa Miceli. Miceli performed an airplane spin on Martel but Doug Somers distracted the referee, allowing Martel to roll-up Miceli by grabbing her tights for leverage to retain the title.

Next, Nick Bockwinkel defended the World Heavyweight Championship against Curt Hennig. Larry Zbyszko showed up to challenge the winner of the match. Near the end of the match, Zbyszko handed a roll of quarters to Hennig, who hit Bockwinkel with them to win the title.

Later, The Midnight Rockers (Shawn Michaels and Marty Jannetty) and Ray Stevens took on the team of Buddy Wolfe, Doug Somers and Kevin Kelly in a six-man tag team match. Stevens pinned Somers with a small package.

In the penultimate match, Jerry Blackwell took on Boris Zhukov. Blackwell hit a clothesline to Zhukov for the win.

The final match was a tag team match pitting Jimmy Snuka and Russ Francis against The Terrorist and The Mercenary. Francis hit a diving splash to Terrorist for the win.

== Results ==
No.	Results	Stipulations	Times
1	Sheik Adnan Al-Kaissy defeated Buck Zumhofe	Singles match	10:45
2	D.J. Peterson vs. Super Ninja ended in a time-limit draw	Singles match	15:00
3	Sherri Martel (c) defeated Madusa Miceli	Singles match for the AWA World Women's Championship	11:00
4	Curt Hennig defeated Nick Bockwinkel (c)	Singles match for the AWA World Heavyweight Championship	26:00
5	The Midnight Rockers (Shawn Michaels and Marty Jannetty) and Ray Stevens defeated Buddy Wolfe, Doug Somers and Kevin Kelly	Six-man tag team match	16:00
6	Jerry Blackwell defeated Boris Zhukov by pinfall	Singles match	10:00
7	Jimmy Snuka and Russ Francis defeated The Terrorist and The Mercenary	Tag team match	12:00
(c) / – the champion(s) heading into the match

== See also ==
- 1987 in professional wrestling
