= AWA Super Sunday =

Professional wrestling show

Super Sunday
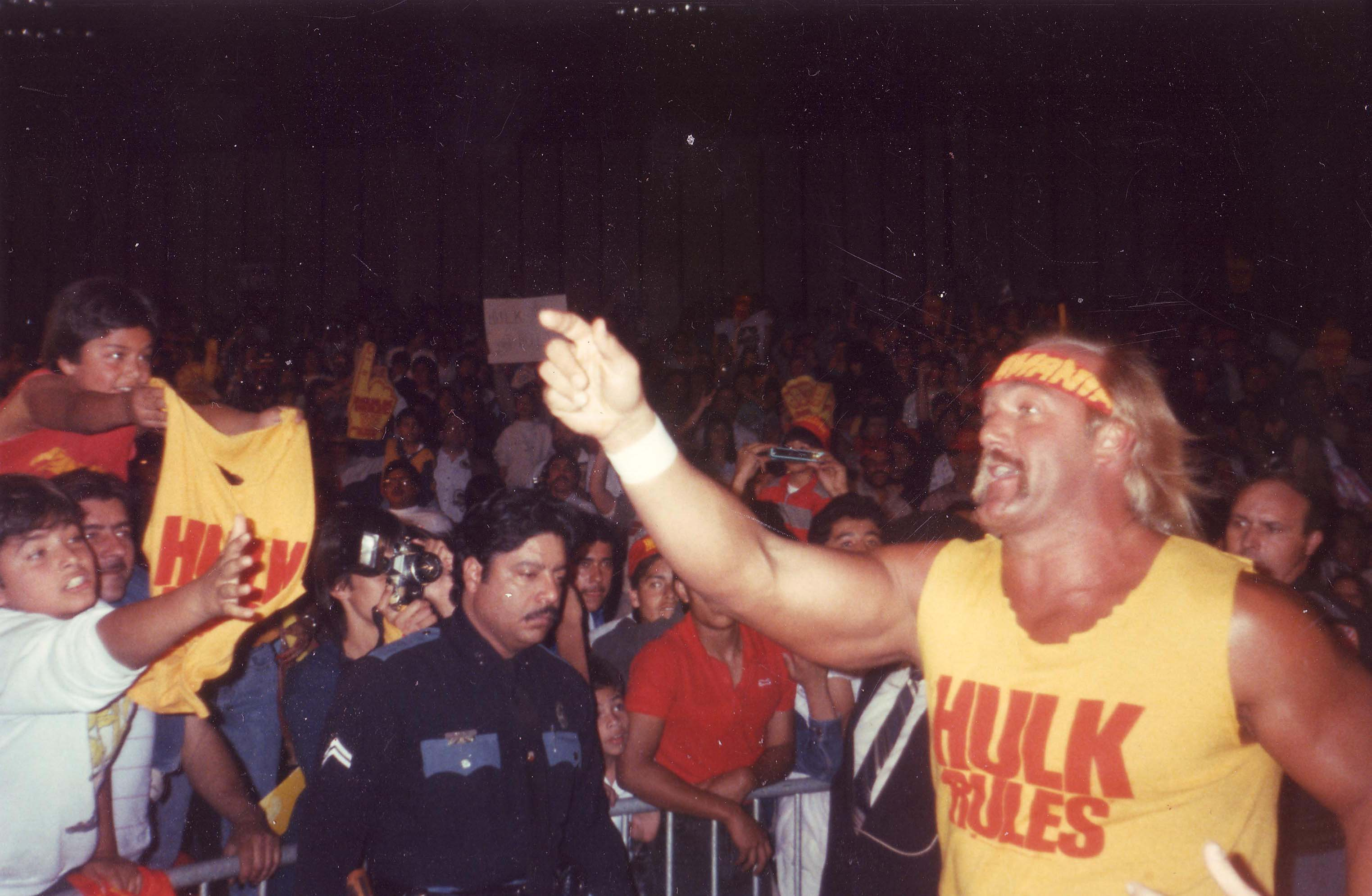
- Hulk Hogan (pictured 1989) who appeared to have won the AWA World Heavyweight Championship at the show.
- Promotion: American Wrestling Association
- Date: April 24, 1983
- City: St. Paul, Minnesota
- Venue: St. Paul Civic Center
- Attendance: 20,000

Event chronology
← Previous —	Next → SuperClash

Super Sunday (later known as SuperClash) was the inaugural professional wrestling Closed-circuit television and supercard event promoted by the American Wrestling Association (AWA). In the main event of the show Hulk Hogan challenging AWA World Champion Nick Bockwinkel for his title. The event also featured Verne Gagne coming out of retirement. Rod Trongard handled commentary duties, while Mean Gene Okerlund was the ring announcer. This event was added to the WWE Network in June 2016.

== Background ==
The event was held at the St. Paul Civic Center in St. Paul, Minnesota on Sunday, April 24, 1983.

== Results ==
No.	Results	Stipulations	Times
1	Brad Rheingans defeated Rocky Stone	Singles match	07:00
2	Buck Zumhofe defeated Steve Regal	Singles match	08:37
3	Jerry Lawler defeated John Tolos	Singles match	07:53
4	The Texas Cowgirls (Wendi Richter and Joyce Grable) (c) defeated Judy Martin and Velvet McIntyre	Tag team match for the NWA Women's World Tag Team Championship	13:46
5	Wahoo McDaniel defeated Eddie Boulder	Singles match	07:06
6	Jesse Ventura, Ken Patera and Blackjack Lanza defeated The High Flyers (Greg Gagne and Jim Brunzell) and Rick Martel	Six-man tag team match	17:03
7	Verne Gagne and Mad Dog Vachon defeated Sheik Adnan El-Kaissey and Jerry Blackwell	Tag team match	12:23
8	Nick Bockwinkel (c) vs. Hulk Hogan ended in a no contest after the referee reversed the decision	Singles match for the AWA World Heavyweight Title with Lord James Blears as special guest referee	18:12
(c) / – the champion(s) heading into the match

== See also ==
- 1983 in professional wrestling
- AWA on television
