= Wally Karbo =

American professional wrestling promoter (1915–1993)

Walter Karbo
Personal information
- Born: August 14, 1915 Minneapolis, Minnesota, U.S.
- Died: March 25, 1993 (aged 77) Edina, Minnesota, U.S.

Professional wrestling career
- Ring name: Wally Karbo
- Billed height: 6 ft 0 in (183 cm)
- Debut: 1936
- Retired: 1985

Walter Joseph Karbo (August 14, 1915 – March 23, 1993) was an American professional wrestling promoter and co-founder of the American Wrestling Association with Verne Gagne.

== Early life ==
The son of Polish immigrants, Karbo graduated from De La Salle High School in 1934 and was offered a basketball scholarship to the University of Notre Dame, but declined to go.

== Career ==
Karbo had a brief spell in boxing for promoter Pinkie George, which caught the attention of fellow wrestling promoter Tony Stecher in the 1930s. Initially working for Stecher as an assistant, he eventually became a referee, officiating 8,000 matches in his early 20s. After this, Karbo evolved into a promoter, attending the first meeting of the National Wrestling Alliance held by Stecher in 1948.

In 1952, Tony Stecher sold a one-third interest in the Minneapolis Boxing and Wrestling club to Wally Karbo and his son Dennis Stecher. After Tony's death in 1954, control of the promotion was passed to Dennis and Karbo. In 1959, Dennis sold his majority stake in the Minneapolis Boxing and Wrestling club to Karbo and Gagne, becoming co-owners of the promotion from that point onward. Breaking away from the National Wrestling Alliance, he and Gagne established the AWA in 1960 and together operated the promotion for over thirty years.

Karbo would also appear as an on-air personality, hosting the AWA's Saturday morning television show All-Star Wrestling before Karbo sold his interests to Gagne in 1985. Although retiring soon after, he did remain in professional wrestling, appearing as the commissioner of the Ladies Pro Wrestling Association.

== Death ==
On March 23, 1993, Karbo suffered a heart attack while eating lunch with a friend in Bloomington, Minnesota. He was taken to the Fairview Southdale Hospital in Edina, where he was pronounced dead at the age of 77. His funeral took place six days later, with Nick Bockwinkel delivering the eulogy.

== Awards and accomplishments ==
- Professional Wrestling Hall of Fame and Museum
  - Class of 2019
