= AWA World Heavyweight Championship =

Professional wrestling championship

Details
- Promotion: AWA
- Date established: May 18, 1960
- Date retired: August 1991
Statistics
- First champion: Pat O'Connor
- Final champion: Larry Zbyszko
- Most reigns: Verne Gagne (10 reigns)
- Longest reign: Verne Gagne (2625 days)
- Shortest reign: Verne Gagne, Mighty Igor Vodic and Dick the Bruiser (7 days)

The AWA World Heavyweight Championship was a professional wrestling world heavyweight championship and the highest ranked championship in the defunct American Wrestling Association (AWA). All AWA trademarks, including the AWA World Heavyweight Championship, are now owned by WWE.

== History ==
The AWA World Heavyweight Championship was established in May 1960, after the AWA was formed by the departure of the Minneapolis, Minnesota-area territory from the National Wrestling Alliance (NWA). Pat O'Connor was conditionally recognized as the first champion upon the AWA's secession from the NWA as O'Connor held the NWA World Heavyweight Championship, which he had won on January 9, 1959, though he was ordered to defend against Verne Gagne within 90 days or he would forfeit the AWA title to Gagne.

The creation of the AWA World Heavyweight Championship along with the NWA World Heavyweight Championship would pave the way for the creation of many other world championships in other wrestling promotions. The AWA and the title became inactive in late 1990 and the organization officially closed down in August 1991 with the title also being decommissioned. The championship is featured in the video games WWE '13 as a downloadable title and as an unlockable title in WWE 2K14 and the seventh-generation console versions of WWE 2K15, WWE 2K16, and WWE 2K17.

== Trademark infringement ==
In 1996, Dale Gagner and his associate Jonnie Stewart, former AWA employees, began using the AWA name in the state of Minnesota and formed a promotion known as AWA Superstars of Wrestling, infringing on the AWA name. The promotion also created their own version of the AWA World Heavyweight Championship. In April 2007, World Wrestling Entertainment (WWE) filed a lawsuit against Dale Gagner citing trademark infringement, as WWE owned all American Wrestling Association properties due to their purchase after the AWA's closure, including the AWA World Heavyweight Championship. In October 2008, the court ruled in favor of WWE. The court ruling prohibits Gagner from exploiting or trading on the AWA name or any other derivatives.

== Title history ==
Key
No.	Overall reign number
Reign	Reign number for the specific champion
Days	Number of days held
†	Championship change is unrecognized by the promotion

No.	Champion	Championship change			Reign statistics		Notes	Ref.
No.	Champion	Date	Event	Location	Reign	Days	Notes	Ref.
1	Pat O'Connor	May 18, 1960	N/A	N/A	1	90	O'Connor, NWA World Heavyweight Championship since 1959, was recognized as the first AWA World Champion in May 1960, but was given 90 days to defend the title against Verne Gagne or be stripped of the title.	
2	Verne Gagne	August 16, 1960	N/A	N/A	1	329	Gagne was awarded the championship after Pat O'Connor failed to defend the title.	
3	Gene Kiniski	July 11, 1961	House show	Minneapolis, Minnesota	1	28		
4	Verne Gagne	August 8, 1961	House show	Minneapolis, Minnesota	2	154		
5	Mr. M	January 9, 1962	House show	Minneapolis, Minnesota	1	224		
6	Verne Gagne	August 21, 1962	House show	Minneapolis, Minnesota	3	322		
7	The Crusher	July 9, 1963	House show	Minneapolis, Minnesota	1	11	The Crusher also won the Omaha version of World Heavyweight Championship from Verne Gagne on February 15, 1963, in Omaha, Nebraska.	
8	Verne Gagne	July 20, 1963	House show	Minneapolis, Minnesota	4	7	Gagne won both the AWA Championship and the Omaha Championship.	
9	Fritz Von Erich	July 27, 1963	House show	Omaha, Nebraska	1	12	Von Erich won both the AWA Championship and the Omaha Championship.	
10	Verne Gagne	August 8, 1963	House show	Amarillo, Texas	5	100	Fritz Von Erich's Omaha Championship was not at stake. On September 7, 1963, Gagne defeated Von Erich in Omaha to unify both titles.	
11	The Crusher	November 16, 1963	House show	Saint Paul, Minnesota	2	28		
12	Verne Gagne	December 14, 1963	House show	Minneapolis, Minnesota	6	140		
13	Mad Dog Vachon	May 2, 1964	House show	Omaha, Nebraska	1	14		
14	Verne Gagne	May 16, 1964	House show	Omaha, Nebraska	7	157		
15	Mad Dog Vachon	October 20, 1964	House show	Minneapolis, Minnesota	2	207		
16	Mighty Igor Vodic	May 15, 1965	House show	Omaha, Nebraska	1	7		
17	Mad Dog Vachon	May 22, 1965	House show	Omaha, Nebraska	3	91		
18	The Crusher	August 21, 1965	House show	Saint Paul, Minnesota	3	83		
19	Mad Dog Vachon	November 12, 1965	House show	Denver, Colorado	4	365 (57)^{†}		
†	Mr. Wrestling	January 8, 1966	House show	Omaha, Nebraska	1^{†}	6		
†	Mad Dog Vachon	January 14, 1966	House show	Omaha, Nebraska	5^{†}	302	AWA president Stanley Blackburn nullified the previous title change, as Mr. Wrestling's legs were on the rope during the pinfall. Vachon defeated Mr. Wrestling in a rematch for the title.	
20	Dick the Bruiser	November 12, 1966	House show	Omaha, Nebraska	1	7		
21	Mad Dog Vachon	November 19, 1966	House show	Omaha, Nebraska	5	99		
22	Verne Gagne	February 26, 1967	House show	Saint Paul, Minnesota	8	538		
23	Dr. X	August 17, 1968	House show	Bloomington, Minnesota	1	14		
24	Verne Gagne	August 31, 1968	House show	Minneapolis, MN	9	2625		
25	Nick Bockwinkel	November 8, 1975	House show	Saint Paul, Minnesota	1	1714		
26	Verne Gagne	July 18, 1980	House show	Chicago, Illinois	10	305	Gagne retired from active wrestling while still the champion.	
27	Nick Bockwinkel	May 19, 1981	N/A	N/A	2	467 (334)^{†}	Bockwinkel was awarded the championship.	
†	Hulk Hogan	April 18, 1982	House show	Saint Paul, Minnesota	1^{†}	6		
†	Nick Bockwinkel	April 24, 1982	—	—	3^{†}	127	Bockwinkel was restored the title by AWA president Stanley Blackburn due to Hogan having used a foreign object during the match.	
28	Otto Wanz	August 29, 1982	House show	Saint Paul, Minnesota	1	41		
29	Nick Bockwinkel	October 9, 1982	House show	Chicago, Illinois	3	501	The title was held up on December 27, 1982, after a match with Jerry Lawler, and was restored to Bockwinkel after defeating Lawler in a rematch on January 10, 1983. The AWA retroactively recognized Bockwinkel's title reign as continuous.	
30	Jumbo Tsuruta	February 22, 1984	House show	Tokyo, Japan	1	81		
31	Rick Martel	May 13, 1984	House show	Saint Paul, Minnesota	1	595		
32	Stan Hansen	December 29, 1985	House show	East Rutherford, NJ	1	181	Hansen defended the title on All Japan Pro Wrestling cards in July 1986.	
33	Nick Bockwinkel	June 28, 1986	House show	Denver, Colorado	4	308	Bockwinkel was awarded the championship when Stan Hansen left the AWA.	
34	Curt Hennig	May 2, 1987	SuperClash II	Daly City, CA	1	373	The title was held up immediately due to controversy over interference by Larry Zbyszko but returned to Hennig days later after the AWA Championship Committee found no no evidence of interference. On February 16, 1988, the title was again held up after a no-contest between Hennig and The Grappler in Portland, OR. Hennig regained the title on March 5 in Portland, when his replacement, The Assassin, defeated The Grappler. AWA recognized Hennig's title reign as continuous.	
35	Jerry Lawler	May 9, 1988	House show	Memphis, TN	1	256	Lawler later defeated Kerry Von Erich on December 13, 1988, in Chicago to win the WCCW World Heavyweight Championship to become the first (USWA) Unified World Champion.	
—	Vacated	January 20, 1989	—	—	—	—	Jerry Lawler was stripped of the championship after the Continental Wrestling Association (CWA) split from the AWA.	
36	Larry Zbyszko	February 7, 1989	House show	Saint Paul, Minnesota	1	368	Zbyszko won a battle royal, last eliminating Tom Zenk to win the vacant title.	
37	Mr. Saito	February 10, 1990	Super Fight in Tokyo Dome	Tokyo, Japan	1	57		
38	Larry Zbyszko	April 8, 1990	SuperClash IV	Saint Paul, Minnesota	2	248		
—	Vacated	December 12, 1990	—	—	—	—	The title was held up when Larry Zbyszko left the AWA for World Championship Wrestling (WCW). Official kayfabe reason was that Zbyszko refused to defend the title on a tour of Japan.	
Championship history is unrecorded from January 1991 to August 1991.
—	Deactivated	August 1991	—	—	—	—	The championship was deactivated when AWA closed.	

== Combined reigns ==
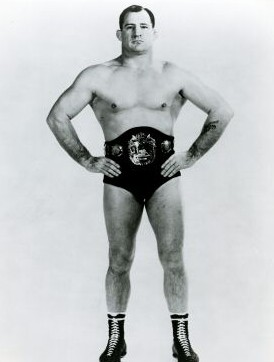
Inaugural champion Pat O'Connor

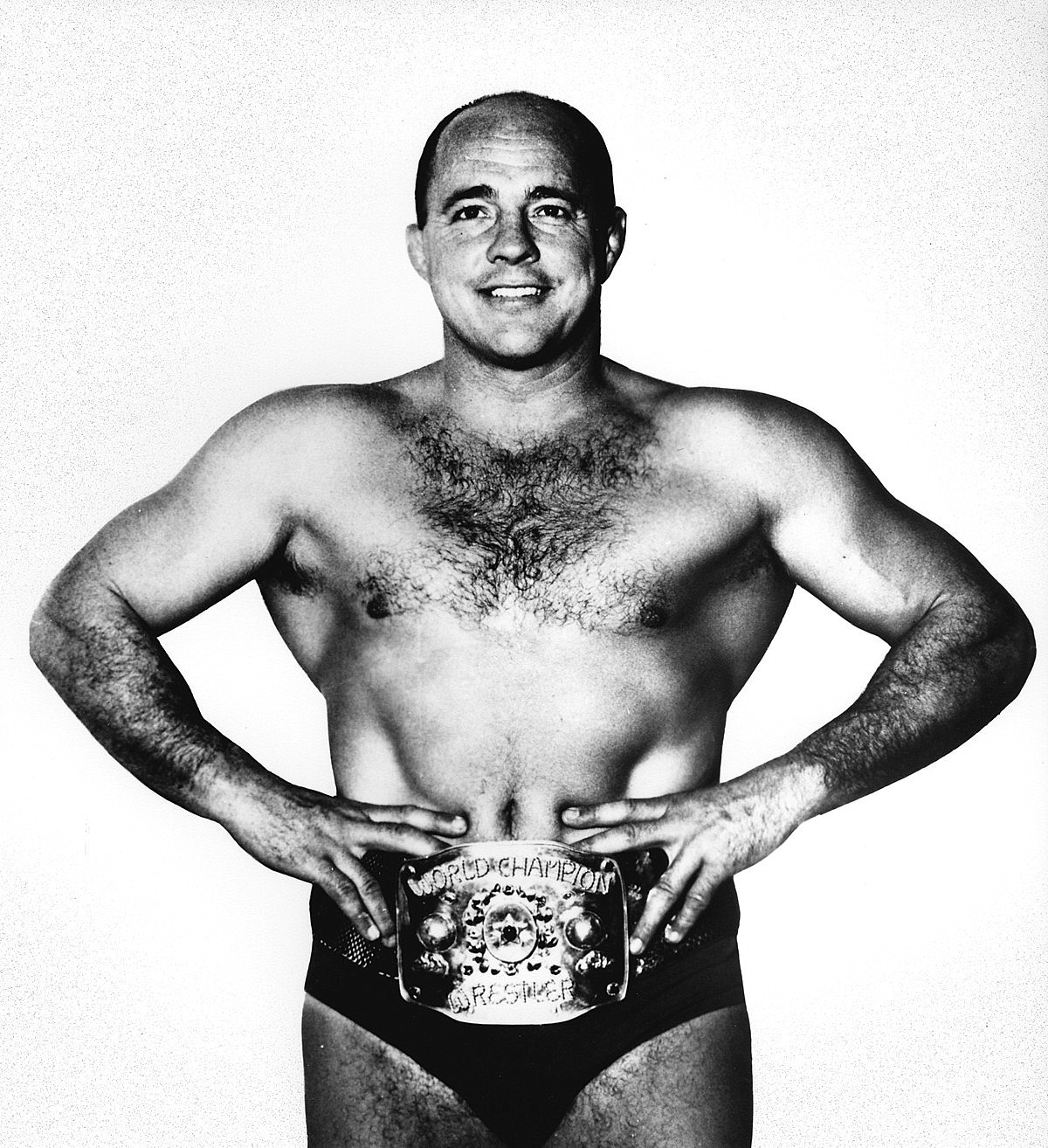
Record 10-time, longest reigning and longest combined champion Verne Gagne

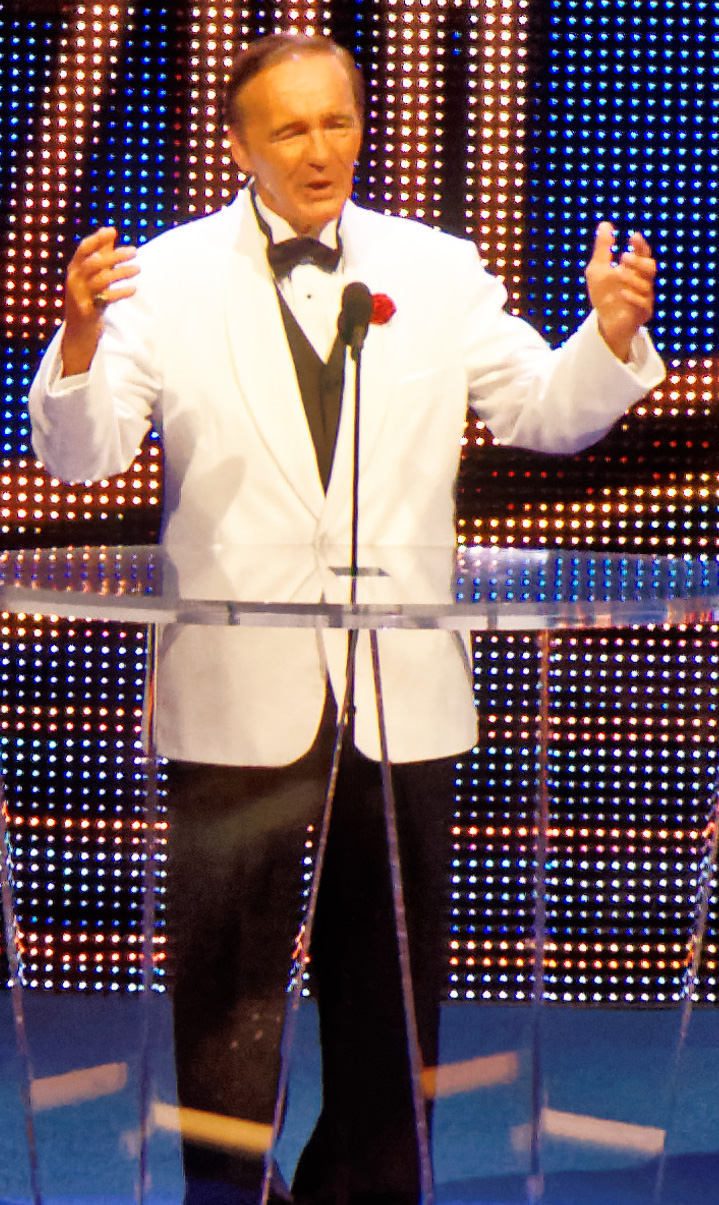
Final champion Larry Zbyszko

Rank	Wrestler	No. of reigns	Combined days
1	Verne Gagne	10	4,677
2	Nick Bockwinkel	4	2,990
3	Mad Dog Vachon	5	776
4	Larry Zbyszko	2	616
5	Rick Martel	1	595
6	Curt Hennig	1	373
7	Jerry Lawler	1	256
8	Mr. M	1	224
9	Stan Hansen	1	181
10	The Crusher	3	122
11	Pat O'Connor	1	90
12	Jumbo Tsuruta	1	81
13	Mr. Saito	1	57
14	Otto Wanz	1	41
15	Gene Kiniski	1	28
16	Dr. X	1	14
17	Fritz Von Erich	1	12
18	Dick the Bruiser	1	7
18	Mighty Igor Vodic	1	7
—	Mr. Wrestling	1	6
—	Hulk Hogan	1	6

== See also ==
- List of early world heavyweight champions in professional wrestling
- World Heavyweight Championship (Omaha)
- USWA Unified World Heavyweight Championship
- WCWA World Heavyweight Championship
- WSL World Heavyweight Championship
- Zero1 World Heavyweight Championship

Sporting positions
Preceded by NWA World Heavyweight Championship	AWA's top heavyweight championship 1960–1990	Succeeded by Final
