= Betty Jo Hawkins =

American professional wrestler (1930–1987)

Personal information
- Born: Elizabeth J. Floyd; October 22, 1930 Boyd, Kentucky, United States
- Died: December 4, 1987 (aged 57)
- Spouse: Brute Bernard

Professional wrestling career
- Ring name(s): Betty Hawkins; Betty Jo Hawkins
- Trained by: Ella Waldek
- Debut: 1948
- Retired: 1959

Elizabeth "Bettie" J. Floyd (October 22, 1930 to December 4, 1987), better known by her ring name Betty Jo Hawkins, was an American professional wrestler.

== Professional wrestling career ==
As a child Floyd suffered from rheumatoid arthritis which caused her pain in her joints. It was misdiagnosed as polio.

Hawkins was trained by Ella Waldek and made her professional wrestling debut in 1948. She won the NWA Florida Women's Championship in 1952 where she became a three-time champion. She later worked in Calgary for Stampede Wrestling and other territories. Hawkins retired from wrestling in 1959 after the arthritis came back.

== Personal life and death ==
Hawkins was married to professional wrestler Brute Bernard. Bernard died in 1984 of a self-inflicted gunshot; it was not determined if his death was a suicide or an accident. One story states that Bernard was playing Russian roulette.

Hawkins died from a heart attack on December 4, 1987. She was 57.

== Championships and accomplishments ==
- Championship Wrestling from Florida
  - NWA Florida Women's Championship (3 times)
- National Wrestling Alliance
  - NWA Women's World Tag Team Championship (2 times) – with Penny Banner (2)
