= NWA Florida Women's Championship =

Professional wrestling women's championship

Details
- Promotion: Championship Wrestling from Florida
- Date established: October 15, 1951
- Date retired: After October 3, 1975
Statistics
- First champion: Mae Young
- Final champion: Bonnie Watson
- Most reigns: Betty Hawkins/Bonnie Watson (3 reigns)

The NWA Florida Women's Championship was a women's professional wrestling title in Championship Wrestling from Florida, which lasted originally from 1951 to at least 1971.

== Title history ==
Key
No.	Overall reign number
Reign	Reign number for the specific champion
Days	Number of days held

No.	Champion	Championship change			Reign statistics		Notes	Ref.
No.	Champion	Date	Event	Location	Reign	Days	Notes	Ref.
1	Mae Young	October 15, 1951	CWF Show	Tampa, FL	1	(Note: The length of the championship reign is too uncertain to calculate.)	Defeated Cora Combs to become the inaugural champion.	
—	Vacated	1952	—	—	—	—	The championship was vacated for undocumented reasons.	
2	Ann LaVerne	March 10, 1952	CWF Show	Tampa, FL	1	(Note: The date the championship was won is uncertain, which means the reign lasted between 52 and 82 days.)	Defeated Betty Hawkins to win the vacant championship.	
3	Betty Hawkins	May 1952	CWF Show	Tampa, FL	1	52–82 (Note: The exact date that Hawkins won the championship is uncertain, which means the reign lasted between 254 and 284 days.)		
4	Mars Bennett	February 9, 1953	CWF Show	Tampa, FL	1	21		
5	Gloria Barattini	March 2, 1953	CWF Show	Tampa, FL	1	210	Last eliminated Mars Bennett in a six-woman battle royal to win the championship.	
6	Betty Hawkins	September 28, 1953	CWF Show	Tampa, FL	2	14		
7	Dot Dotson	October 12, 1953	CWF Show	Tampa, FL	1	35		
8	Betty Hawkins	November 16, 1953	CWF Show	Tampa, FL	3			
—	Vacated	1955	—	—	—	—	The Championship was vacated when Betty Hawkins does not defend the title for over six months.	
9	Gloria Barattini	March 7, 1955	CWF Show	Tampa, FL	2		Defeated Mae Young to win the vacant championship; still billed as champion on October 15, 1956	
Championship history is unrecorded from October 15, 1956 to March 29, 1957.
10	Judy Glover	March 29, 1957 (NLT)	CWF Show	N/A	1		Glover still billed as champion on April 25, 1957.	
Championship history is unrecorded from April 25, 1957 to November 15, 1960.
11	Bonnie Watson	November 15, 1960	CWF Show	Lake Worth Beach, FL	1		Defeated Ella Waldek to win the NWA Southern Women's Championship and is also recognized as Florida champion; still champion billed as on December 6, 1960.	
Championship history is unrecorded from December 6, 1960 to October 26, 1961.
12	Ella Waldek	October 26, 1961 (NLT)	CWF Show	N/A	1		Waldek listed as champion on February 6, 1962 and January 28, 1964; billed as the world champion on February 16, 1964 until at least March 11, 1964.	
Championship history is unrecorded from October 26, 1961 to June 1969.
13	Sherri Lee	June 1969 (Note: Possibly June 25 in Miami, Florida.)	CWF Show	N/A	1	463–492 (Note: The date the championship was won is uncertain, which means it lasted between 463 and 492 days.)	Lee may have defeated Barbara Galento to win the championship.	
14	Ella Waldek	October 6, 1970	CWF Show	Tampa, FL	2	256		
15	Bonnie Watson	June 19, 1971	CWF Show	St. Petersburg, FL	2	1,529		
16	Early Dawn	August 26, 1975	CWF Show	Fort Myers, FL	1	7		
17	Bonnie Watson	September 2, 1975	CWF Show	Fort Myers, FL	3			
—	Deactivated	October 3, 1975	—	—	—	—	Last time Bonnie Watson was listed as champion.	

== See also ==
- Championship Wrestling from Florida
- National Wrestling Alliance
