= WWE Hall of Fame (2018) =

WWE Hall of Fame induction ceremony

- Promotion: WWE
- Date: April 6, 2018
- City: New Orleans, Louisiana
- Venue: Smoothie King Center

WWE Hall of Fame chronology
← Previous; 2017	Next → 2019

WWE Hall of Fame (2018) was the event that featured the introduction of the 19th class to the WWE Hall of Fame. The event was produced by WWE on April 6, 2018, from the Smoothie King Center in New Orleans, Louisiana. The event took place the same weekend as WrestleMania 34. The event aired live on the WWE Network, and was hosted by Jerry Lawler. The following night, a condensed one-hour version of the ceremony aired on USA Network.

== Background ==
On January 15, 2018, ESPN announced that Goldberg would be inducted as the headliner of the WWE Hall of Fame. Goldberg, after a successful run with World Championship Wrestling, signed a one-year contract with World Wrestling Entertainment (WWE) in March 2003, debuting on the March 31 episode of Raw. Goldberg would go on to face Lesnar at WrestleMania XX, however fans knew this would be the final WWE match for both Goldberg and Lesnar, and thus gave largely negative reactions throughout the performance. During the episode of WWE 24 featuring Goldberg, he admitted that he did not have the right attitude while in the WWE, which caused him to leave on bad terms. After a twelve-year absence, Goldberg appeared on the October 3, 2016 episode of SportsCenter, where he contemplated a return to WWE, which eventually occurred on an episode of Raw, two weeks later. Goldberg's return would include a run with the WWE Universal Championship, and ended after his match with Lesnar at WrestleMania 33. Goldberg appeared the following night on Raw Talk (which aired on the WWE Network after the Raw broadcast) to wish the fans farewell, but ultimately did not rule out a return in the future.

On February 19, 2018, WWE announced that Jeff Jarrett would be inducted into the WWE Hall of Fame on April 6, an announcement that was met with "widespread surprise" due to the circumstances of Jarrett's departure from the promotion in 1999 and his role in founding Impact Wrestling. Jarrett left the WWF in October 1999, right after WWF head writer Vince Russo resigned from the WWF in order to join WCW. Jarrett's contract expired on October 16, 1999, one day before his scheduled match with Chyna at No Mercy. Jarrett wrestled at No Mercy nonetheless, losing the Intercontinental Championship to Chyna. Chyna later alleged that Jarrett and Russo had colluded in order to delay Jarrett's title defense until after Jarrett's contract had expired, and that Jarrett had subsequently made a deal with WWF Chairman Vince McMahon for $300,000 in order to wrestle without a contract. In 2006, Jarrett asserted that he had been paid only what he was owed by the WWF. In a 2008 interview for a TNA special, Jarrett stated that not only were his negotiations cordial and in good faith, but that he also got stock options in WWF's IPO, which occurred two days after he left.

== Event ==
Due to the launch of the WWE Network shortly before WrestleMania XXX, this event featured the fifth "Red Carpet" event as a one-hour pre-show prior to the start of the event. The pre-show was hosted by Byron Saxton, and Maria Menounos. Renee Young and Charly Caruso conducted interviews from the red carpet.

The event itself had kicked off with an image stating it was in memory of Johnny Valiant, who died two days earlier. Valiant was struck at 5:30 a.m. and killed by a pickup truck in Ross Township. He was taken to Allegheny General Hospital, where he was pronounced dead.

The first inductees were The Dudley Boyz (Bubba Ray Dudley and D-Von Dudley), who were inducted by Edge and Christian. Edge and Christian discussed why they were chosen to induct The Dudley Boyz, and how their team and The Hardy Boyz would not exist without the Dudleys. During the Dudleys speech, Bubba Ray told D-Von he is only supposed to say "testify", to which D-Von responded that he is now a producer and Bubba Ray needs to step back. They both thanked their families, including a reference to Mr. T's long speech at the WWE Hall of Fame ceremony. They continued by saying they are the first Extreme Championship Wrestling act to be inducted into the Hall of Fame, and thanked their fellow ECW wrestlers. They invited Edge, Christian and The Hardy Boyz on stage with them, as Bubba Ray said it was thanks to the six of them together that they are where they are today. Their music then played signalling it was time to wrap up, and they finished by putting the producer through a table.

Lawler next introduced Hillbilly Jim by stating he was already in the Denim Overalls Hall of Fame and the Moonshine Hall of Fame. Jimmy Hart came out to induct Jim, stating they have been friends for 39 years, and he never would have worked for the WWE if it were not for him. Jim talked about the story of how he got involved in wrestling, and thanked Jim Ross, Dale Mann, Archie Gouldie, Stu Hart, Jerry Lawler, Jerry Jarrett and Pat Patterson for giving him the opportunities they did. Jim went on to say he was accepting this honor on behalf of his mother, family and most of all the fans. Jim finished by talking about his friends Johnny Valiant, André the Giant, Lord Alfred Hayes, Gorilla Monsoon, Bobby Heenan, Freddie Blassie, Lou Albano, Jimmy Snuka, Randy Savage, and Roddy Piper; who all meant so much to him but are no longer around to see his induction.

In 2016, WWE introduced a new category for the Hall of Fame called the "Legacy" wing. Inductees under this new category feature wrestlers from the early years of professional wrestling, primarily during the early part of the 20th century. All inductees in 2018 were inducted posthumously and were recognized with a video package at the ceremony. A video montage was run next for the legacy inductees, which were Stan Stasiak, El Santo, Jim Londos, Sputnik Monroe, Boris Malenko, Dara Singh, Hiro Matsuda, Rufus R. Jones, Cora Combs, and lastly Lord Alfred Hayes.

Ivory was the next inductee, inducted by Molly Holly. Holly discussed all that Ivory has done in the ring and out, and called out Lilian Garcia to introduce Ivory. Ivory spoke about her road stories and how the women's movement has progressed over the years. Ivory compared being inducted to getting married as you only do it once (while poking fun at Ric Flair), and went on to say she has never been married, so she is treating this as her wedding. While describing how it would relate to her wedding, Ivory was cut off by the Right to Censor music when her descriptions got too sexual. Ivory finished by thanking her family and the fans.

Kid Rock was next inducted into the WWE Hall of Fame, Celebrity Wing, by Triple H. Triple H talked about how Kid Rock was the voice of the attitude era, and all he provided to the WWE over the years. Kid Rock started by saying Vince McMahon does not like getting thanked, so he wanted to send a big thank you to McMahon for all he did. Rock spoke briefly about his involvement in the WWE and finished by talking about his former bandmate Joe C.

Lawler said the next inductee Jeff Jarrett, means a lot to him, as he helped train him during their times in Memphis. Road Dogg came out to induct Jarrett, and discussed their times on the road. Jarrett discussed his career and times in groups such as The Four Horsemen and the New World Order. Jarrett said there are two people who have meant a lot to him that he had to thank, and emotionally thanked both Road Dogg and Owen Hart. After telling some stories on the road, Jarrett thanked Karen Jarrett, his kids, his father Jerry Jarrett, and his grandmother Christine. Jarrett ended by reciting a poem which he had recited during his first wrestling appearance. Following Jarrett's speech, Road Dogg came out and the two sang their song With My Baby Tonight.

Following Ultimate Warrior's death in April 2014, WWE introduced the Warrior Award, in 2015, for those who have "exhibited unwavering strength and perseverance, and who lives life with the courage and compassion that embodies the indomitable spirit of the Ultimate Warrior." The 2018 inductee was Jarrius "JJ" Robertson, a double liver transplant survivor.

Mark Henry was next inducted by Big Show. Henry discussed his family and what made him come into wrestling. Henry then transitioned into his Sexual Chocolate persona, talking to Stephanie McMahon before turning to his wife, and thanked Mae Young and Chyna for helping make the character. Henry went on to talk about the great times he had with the Nation of Domination, and talked about his relationship with each of the members. He then went on to plead with Martha Hart, the widow of Owen Hart, to please allow Owen to be inducted into the Hall of Fame. Henry then changed his jacket to the jacket he wore during his previous false retirement, and challenged AJ Styles and Roman Reigns, before removing the jacket and thanking everyone.

Paul Heyman came out to induct Goldberg, and after announcing him cameras followed Goldberg to the stage from the locker room, similar to his entrances on Monday Nitro, while the people in attendance chanted his name. Goldberg stated that much like his matches his speech will be short. Goldberg started by stating he was the first WCW and WWE Champion to be Jewish and to have a bar-mitzvah. Goldberg went on to thank those who helped train him and made him look good in the ring, as well as his family, and for their support during his return to the ring. Goldberg finished by thanking the fans, sharing a Stephanie McMahon story, and discussing the respect he had for Sting and Diamond Dallas Page.

== Inductees ==
=== Individual ===
- Class headliners appear in **boldface**

Image	Ring name (Birth Name)	Inducted by	WWE recognized accolades
	**Goldberg** (William Goldberg)	Paul Heyman	One-time WCW World Heavyweight Champion; Two-time WCW United States Heavyweight Champion; One-time WCW World Tag Team Champion; One-time World Heavyweight Champion; One-time WWE Universal Champion; Recognized as having a 173–0 undefeated streak in WCW. In 2020, He also won the WWE Universal Championship in his second reign.
	Ivory (Lisa Moretti)	Molly Holly	Three-time WWF Women's Champion
	Jeff Jarrett	Road Dogg	Six-time NWA World Heavyweight Champion; Four-time WCW World Heavyweight Champion; Three-time WCW United States Heavyweight Champion; Six-time WWF Intercontinental Champion; One-time WWF European Champion; One-time WWF Tag Team Champion Credited by WWE for promoting TNA that gave future WWE Superstars like AJ Styles, Bobby Roode, and Eric Young their first major exposure
	Hillbilly Jim (James Morris)	Jimmy Hart	30+ year association with WWE as a wrestler, manager, and ambassador
	Mark Henry	Big Show	One-time World Heavyweight Champion; One-time ECW Champion; One-time WWF European Champion

=== Tag team ===
Image	Group	Inducted by	WWE recognized accolades
	The Dudley Boyz	Edge and Christian	Eight-time WWF/World Tag Team Champions; One-time WWE Tag Team Champions; Eight-time ECW Tag Team Champions; One-time WCW Tag Team Champions; One-time NWA World Tag Team Champions
Bubba Ray Dudley (Mark LoMonaco) – 10-time WWF/E Hardcore Champion

=== Celebrity ===
Image	Recipient (Birth name)	Occupation	Inducted by	Appearances
	Kid Rock (Robert Ritchie)	Rapper/Singer/Musician	Triple H	Performed live at several WWE events (Monday Night Raw in 2000, WrestleMania 25 in 2009, and Tribute to the Troops in 2012); Provided entrance themes for The Undertaker ("American Bad Ass") and Stacy Keibler ("Legs"); Numerous songs used as official pay-per-view themes

=== Warrior Award ===
Recipient (Birth name)	Presented By	Notes
Jarrius "JJ" Robertson	Dana Warrior	Double liver transplant survivor

=== Legacy ===
Image	Ring name (Birth name)	WWE recognized accolades
	Boris Malenko (Lawrence Simon)	Held numerous regional NWA championships Father of wrestlers Dean and Joe Malenko
—N/a	Cora Combs (Cora Svonsteckik)	Four-time NWA United States Women's Champion; Two-time NWA Southern Women's Champion (Florida version)
	Dara Singh	Held the World Wide Wrestling Association World Heavyweight Championship, NWA Canadian Open Tag Team Championship
	El Santo (Rodolfo Guzmán Huerta)	Inaugural NWA World Welterweight Champion; Starred in 53 films and is considered a folk hero in Mexican culture
—N/a	Hiro Matsuda (Yasuhiro Kojima)	Four-time NWA Florida Tag Team Champion; Four-time NWA Southern Heavyweight Champion (Florida version); Two-time NWA World Junior Heavyweight Champion; Trained Hulk Hogan, Lex Luger, and numerous other wrestlers
	Jim Londos (Christos Theofilou)	Two-time World Heavyweight Wrestling Champion
	Rufus R. Jones (Carey Lloyd)	One-time World Negro Heavyweight Champion; Held numerous regional NWA championships
	Sputnik Monroe (Rosco Merrick)	Credited with ending segregation at sporting events in Memphis, Tennessee
	Stan Stasiak (George Stipich)	One-time WWWF Heavyweight Champion; Father of former WCW and WWF/WWE wrestler Shawn Stasiak
	Lord Alfred Hayes (Alfred Hayes)	Long-time WWF employee
