= Ida Mae Martinez =

American professional wrestler and nurse

Personal information
- Born: Ida Mae Martinez; September 9, 1931 New London, Connecticut
- Died: January 19, 2010 (aged 78)

Professional wrestling career
- Ring name(s): Ida Mae Martinez; Ida May Martinez
- Billed height: 5 ft 2 in (157 cm)
- Billed weight: 125 lb (57 kg)
- Debut: 1951
- Retired: 1960

Ida Mae Martinez Selenkow (September 9, 1931 – January 19, 2010) was an American professional wrestler in the 1950s, known as Ida Mae Martinez. After her retirement in 1960, she appeared in the 2004 documentary Lipstick & Dynamite about the early years of Women's professional wrestling in North America. In addition to wrestling, Martinez was a yodeler, releasing the CD The Yodeling Lady Ms. Ida also in 2004. Martinez also obtained a Master's Degree in Nursing and was one of the first nurses in Baltimore to work with AIDS patients.

== Professional wrestling career ==
After watching a female professional wrestling match between Johnny Mae Young and Gloria Barattini, Martinez sought out promoter Billy Wolfe. Wolfe invited her to train in Columbus, Ohio. She debuted professionally in August 1951 in Ohio. She won the Championship of Mexico in 1952. She held the title until 1953.

She retired in 1960 after remarrying. In the 1980s, she became a board member for the Cauliflower Alley Club. Martinez also was featured in the 2004 documentary about women's wrestling, Lipstick & Dynamite. In 2006, the Professional Wrestling Hall of Fame awarded her the Senator Hugh Farley Award for her contribution in and outside of the ring.

== Personal life ==
Martinez was born in New London, Connecticut and raised in North Stonington, where she lived with relatives after her mother abandoned her. She never knew her father.

Her guardians were reportedly abusive and she left home sometime between the ages of 13 and 15 to live with her cousin. She attended Norwich Free Academy, but eventually dropped out of high school. In addition to school, she worked as a yodeler and singer at country and minstrel shows. She married at age 17 and claimed that her husband was abusive. Her wrestling career began in 1948, when a customer, who was a wrestler, asked her if she wanted to wrestle. She said yes.

She retired from the ring in 1960 to marry a Baltimore businessman, Herbert Selenkow. They later had two daughters, but later divorced. She received her GED in 1971, an Associate's Degree in nursing in 1975, and a Bachelor's Degree in nursing in 1980. Ten years later she received her Master's Degree from the University of Maryland School of Nursing. She was inducted into the Nursing Honor Society Sigma Theta Tau. She was one of the first nurses in Baltimore to care for AIDS patients. She also published writings about her work with AIDS patients.

She later converted to Judaism. In 2004, she released a yodeling CD, The Yodeling Lady Ms. Ida. She appeared on The Rosie O'Donnell Show as a yodeler in April 1999. She was also a member of the Western Music Association.

== Championships and accomplishments ==
- Professional Wrestling Hall of Fame and Museum
  - Senator Hugh Farley Award (2006)
- Other titles
  - Championship of Mexico
  - Ladies' International Wrestling Association Award (1989)
  - Gulf Coast Wrestling Reunion Pioneer Award
  - Seattle Hall of Fame Award (1999)

== See also ==
- List of Jewish professional wrestlers
