= Beverly Shade =

American professional wrestler (1936–2023)

Personal information
- Born: March 21, 1936 Nashville, Tennessee, U.S.
- Died: June 2, 2023 (aged 87) Southaven, Mississippi, U.S.
- Spouse: Billy Blue River (m. 1969)
- Children: 2

Professional wrestling career
- Ring names: Beverly Blue River; Beverly Shade
- Billed height: 5 ft 8 in (173 cm)
- Billed weight: 145 lb (66 kg)
- Trained by: Ella Waldek
- Debut: 1958
- Retired: 1989

Beverly Wenhold (March 21, 1936 – June 2, 2023), known by the ring name Beverly Shade, was an American professional wrestler. Her career spanned from the 1950s to the 1980s, a fixture in the women's wrestling scene for decades. During her career, she held the NWA Women's Tag Team Championship.

== Professional wrestling career ==
Shade began her training in 1957 under Ella Waldek, and would later adapt the nickname "The Hammer". Shade's first match occurred in Lakeland, Florida, where she participated in a battle royal. In August 1978, Shade alongside her trainee Natasha the Hatchet Lady won the NWA Women's Tag Team Championship. Later, she teamed with another trainee, Tracy Richards as The Arm & Hammer Connection.

Over the course of her wrestling career, Shade held titles such as the All-Star Wrestling Women's Championship twice.

== Personal life and death ==
Shade was married to fellow wrestler Billy Blue River. They would team together in mixed matches as ‘Beverly Two River’. Billy also launched his outlaw group in Florida with Shade by his side. The couple had two sons.

Shade died from complications of lung cancer on June 2, 2023, at the age of 87.

== Championships and accomplishments ==
All-Star Wrestling (Florida)
Title	Times / Year	Partner	Ref
Florida Women’s Championship	2×	—	
Cauliflower Alley Club
Honor	Year	Partner	Ref
Other honoree	2000	—	
International Wrestling Alliance (Florida)
Title	Times / Year	Partner	Ref
IWA World Women’s Tag Team Championship	1×	Tracy Richards	
National Wrestling Alliance
Title	Times / Year	Partner	Ref
NWA Women’s Tag Team Championship	1×	Natasha the Hatchet Lady	
Professional Wrestling Hall of Fame
Honor	Year	Partner	Ref
Class of 2019	—	—	
Women’s Wrestling Hall of Fame
Honor	Year	Partner	Ref
Class of 2023	—	—	
