= Sportatorium =

The name Sportatorium, a contraction of sports auditorium, has been used as the name of three indoor sports arenas:

- Dallas Sportatorium, in Dallas, Texas
- Hollywood Sportatorium, in Hollywood, Florida
- Tampa Sportatorium, a small television studio in Tampa, Florida
