= Lipstick and Dynamite, Piss and Vinegar: The First Ladies of Wrestling =

2004 film

Lipstick and Dynamite: The First Ladies of Wrestling
- DVD cover
- Directed by: Ruth Leitman
- Produced by: Ruth Leitman
- Starring: Ella Waldek; Gladys Gillem; Ida Mae Martinez; Mae Young; The Fabulous Moolah; Penny Banner
- Cinematography: Ruth Leitman; Nancy Segler
- Music by: The Corn Sisters
- Release date: May 4, 2004 (Tribeca Film Festival)
- Running time: 75 minutes
- Country: United States
- Language: English

Lipstick and Dynamite: The First Ladies of Wrestling (often referred to as Lipstick and Dynamite) is a 2004 documentary film about the early days of women's professional wrestling in North America. It was directed by Ruth Leitman, who interviewed The Fabulous Moolah, Mae Young, Gladys "Kill 'Em" Gillem, Ida Mae Martinez, Ella Waldek and Penny Banner for the film. The film premiered in 2004 in Toronto and was screened at various film festivals across the United States. The film also had a limited release in theaters in 2005. Reviews for the film were mixed.

== Synopsis ==
The documentary tells its story by focusing on the careers of six women—The Fabulous Moolah, Mae Young, Gladys "Kill 'Em" Gillem, Ida Mae Martinez, Ella Waldek and Penny Banner. It begins by describing the beginning of wrestling in the 1930s. By the 1940s, American men had to leave the country to fight in World War II, leaving females to take over the sport. At first, women's wrestling was seen as a side-show, and it was banned in several states. The film mostly focuses on these years—the 1940s—along with the 1950s and 1960s, better known as the "heyday of women's wrestling", when the sport became more accepted and popular. The six women are interviewed and tell their stories of why they entered wrestling. They also share tales of being exploited financially, unruly fans, and being physically abused. The film splices in archival footage of their matches, television clips, and footage from a 1951 movie entitled Racket Girls in between interviews. The film also covers their post-wrestling occupations: lion-tamer, detective, nurse, and yodeler. The film ends with footage from the Gulf Coast Wrestlers Reunion, where they meet to swap stories.

== Production ==
"They really need to see the real us, meaning us, the women. We've been stereotyped for a long time, as masculine, they think we're butches, this and that. That's not true. I think many of us have a lot of class, and we show it."

— Ida May Martinez

Although Leitman was not a fan of professional wrestling, she was the first to develop the idea of a documentary about the beginnings of female wrestling. The objective of the film was to give back to the female professional wrestlers of the 1940s–1960s. The stars hoped the film would help "set the record straight" about the early days of women's wrestling, when it was taboo for girls to join the business.

Penny Banner helped put the film together, as she had connections in both the Ladies International Wrestling Association and the Cauliflower Alley Club, which helped the director locate older stars to use in the filming.

Kelly Hogan, an old friend of Leitman's, offered to provide music for the film and soundtrack, and recorded songs with the combo, The Corn Sisters, Carolyn Mark and Neko Case. While recording, Case discovered that Ella Waldek was her great-aunt, which was previously unknown to her. After providing music for the film, they began promoting it at all of their shows.

Leitman also produced the film with the productions companies 100-to-One Films and Ruthless Films.

== Release ==
The film had its world premiere in Toronto in April 2004 during the Hot Docs Film Festival, and it had its United States premiere at the Tribeca Film Festival in New York City in May 2004. It had several other screenings, as well, including at the Atlanta Film Festival in June 2004 and the Chicago and Hamptons Film Festivals in October 2004. In early 2005, the film played at the Sarasota and Miami Film Festivals.

The film, distributed by Koch Lorber Films, had a limited theatrical release in the United States during the course of 2005. In its first weekend, it made $4,046. At the end of eleven weeks, it had appeared in three theaters and grossed $25,378. The film was released on DVD in September 2005.

To help promote the film, The Fabulous Moolah and Mae Young were interviewed on Late Night with Conan O'Brien. They also promoted the film on The Tonight Show with Jay Leno. Several magazines also advertised for the film, including Entertainment Weekly, Details, FHM, and O.

== Critical response ==
The Atlanta Journal-Constitution gave the film a positive review, citing at as "a dynamite documentary" and rating it a B+. Similarly, Karie Bible of IGN called the film a "fascinating look" and a "valentine to wrestling and to the women who introduced the sport across America". Liz Braun of the Toronto Sun called the film "a glimpse of the wild and woolly pre-feminist world these capable women inhabited" and invites readers to "have a look." The Los Angeles Times' Kenneth Turan commented that the "uneasy, unnerving air of the carny hangs over this film, and it gives off a pungent whiff of how rough, rowdy and raucous, how inescapably down and dirty, these women's world could be."

Other reviews were mixed, with the film scoring a 62% at Rotten Tomatoes and an average rating of 6.4/10 from critics. Roger Ebert praised Leitman for doing "an extraordinary job of assembling the survivors from the early days of a disreputable sport" and rated the film with two and a half stars out of four.

Stephen Holden of The New York Times called the movie "more of a scrapbook than a coherent history". The San Francisco Chronicle's Peter Hartlaub stated that the film "doesn't succeed in its attempt to make a feminist statement, with too many of the wrestlers sounding like male athletes who talk in excruciating detail about high school football seasons that everyone else forgot." Echoing that statement, Russell Scott Smith of the New York Post stated, "Unfortunately, the filmmakers let the ladies prattle on too long about issues that would only matter to the most rabid wrestling aficionados."
