= Janet Wolfe =

American professional wrestler

Janet Boyer Wolfe

Personal information
- Born: Jeanette Boyer; June 13, 1933 Orr, Minnesota, U.S.
- Died: July 28, 1951 (aged 18) East Liverpool, Ohio, U.S.
- Cause of death: Brain haemorrhage
- Family: Billy Wolfe (father); Mildred Burke (mother)

Professional wrestling career
- Ring name(s): Janet Boyer; Janet Boyer Wolfe; Janet Wolfe; Jeanette Wolfe; Violet Wolfe
- Billed height: 5 ft 3 in (160 cm)
- Billed weight: 120 lb (54 kg)
- Trained by: Billy Wolfe
- Debut: 1951

Jeanette Boyer (June 13, 1933 – July 28, 1951), also known as Janet Boyer Wolfe, was an American professional wrestler. She was the foster daughter of Billy Wolfe and Mildred Burke. She was trained by her father, who operated a troupe of female wrestlers associated with the NWA.

== Early history ==
Jeanette Boyer was born to Selma Boyer, and was raised in Orr in St. Louis County, Minnesota. Little is known about her family life, other than she attended a wrestling school and was trained by Tony Stecher in wrestling, hoping to get signed into a promotion. She was eventually sent to Billy Wolfe when she was 17, but was initially rejected due to her small size and weight. Shortly after turning 18 and gaining weight, she was adopted by Billy Wolfe, who mentored her. She adopted "Wolfe" as her surname.

She only wrestled three matches in her life, with the third being against Ella Waldek on July 27, 1951.

== Death ==
On July 27, 1951, Wolfe was body-slammed hard on the mat by Ella Waldek, to whom she lost the match in approximately seven minutes, which might have ruptured a vein in her stomach. Later that same evening, in the final contest of the benefit show at Patterson Field in East Liverpool, Ohio, she was scheduled to be the tag-team partner of Eva Lee, but she was complaining of a major headache minutes prior to this. Nevertheless she wrestled for a few minutes before tagging Lee, who then saw her partner collapse on the ring apron and lost consciousness.

The match was stopped as people attended to Wolfe, who never regained consciousness. She was brought into the locker room, where she was briefly operated on by medical officials who were at the event, applying oxygen masks, before paramedics arrived and took Wolfe to East Liverpool Osteopathic Hospital, where she was pronounced dead at 4:00 a.m. on July 28. The official cause of death was a brain hemorrhage, and the doctor found that a blood clot had formed possibly six or seven days before, signifying that Waldek was not to blame for her death, even though police questioned all three women involved in the match and ultimately let them go.

In the aftermath, Waldek continued to perform and was labeled as a murderer by the crowd, something which is said to have helped her notoriety. Waldek, however, always believed that the huge meal that Wolfe ate between the two matches contributed to her death.

== See also ==
- List of premature professional wrestling deaths
