= Mae Young =

American professional wrestler (1923–2014)

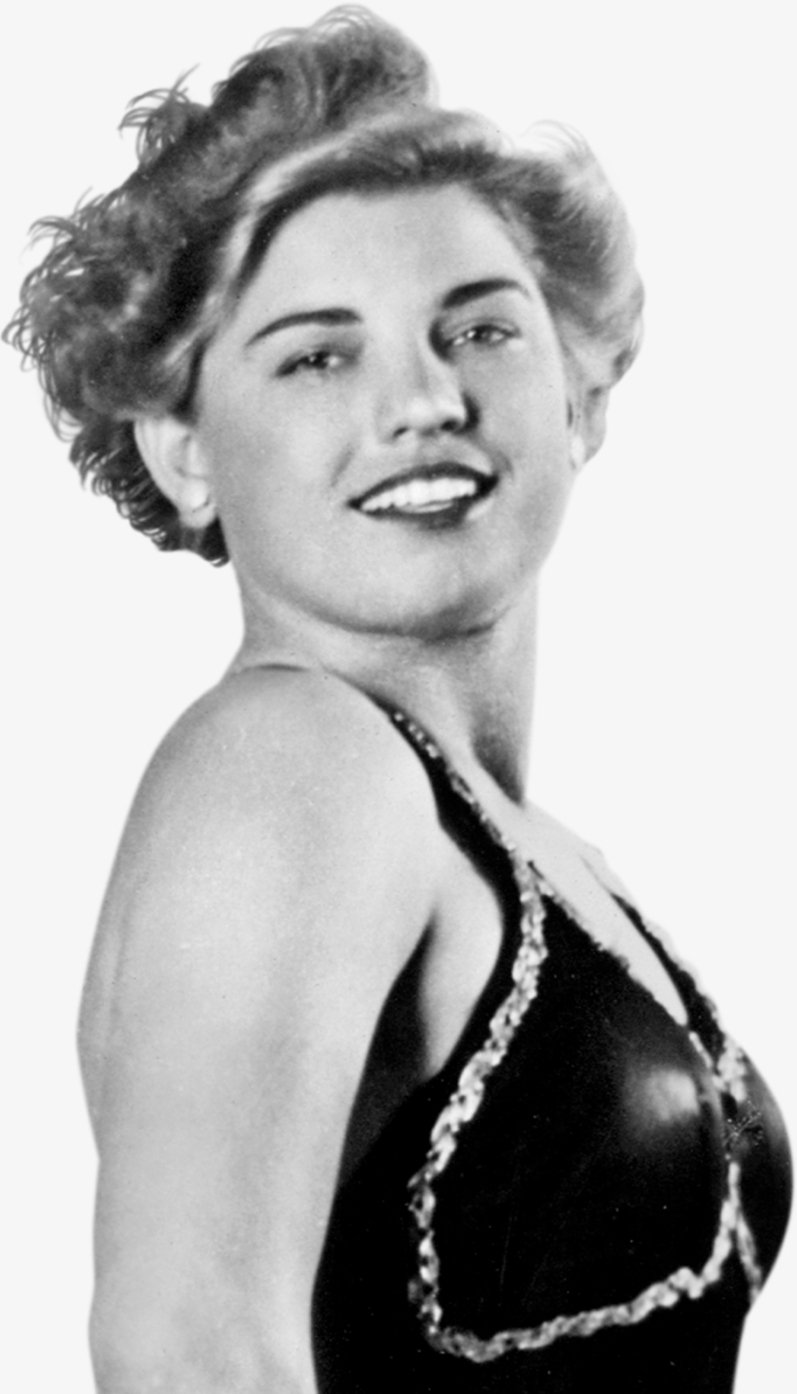
- Young in the 1950s
- Born: Johnnie Mae Young; March 12, 1923; Sand Springs, Oklahoma, U.S.
- Died: January 14, 2014 (aged 90); Columbia, South Carolina, U.S.
- Resting place: Greenlawn Memorial Park; Columbia, South Carolina
- Occupation: Professional wrestler
- Years active: 1939–2014
- Professional wrestling career
- Ring name(s): Mae Young; Miss May Young "The Queen" Mae Young; The Queen; Billie Young; The Great Mae Young; Madame X Mae the Queen; Mrs. Stasiak; Marie Young
- Billed height: 5 ft 3 in (160 cm)
- Billed from: Sand Springs, Oklahoma
- Trained by: Mildred Burke
- Debut: August 20, 1939
- Retired: November 15, 2010

Johnnie Mae Young (March 12, 1923 – January 14, 2014) was an American professional wrestler, trainer and promoter. She wrestled throughout the United States and Canada and won multiple titles in the National Wrestling Alliance. Young is considered one of the pioneers in women's wrestling as she helped to increase the popularity of the sport throughout the 1940s and during World War II. In 1954, she and Mildred Burke were among the first female competitors to tour post-war Japan.

Beginning in 1999, Young had renewed success in her career after joining World Wrestling Federation (WWF, now WWE). Young was part of a recurring comedic duo with best friend The Fabulous Moolah in appearances on WWE televised events. Young is also remembered for taking bumps well past the age of 70 on televised programming. In 2004, she was inducted into the Professional Wrestling Hall of Fame and Museum as part of their "Lady Wrestler" category. On March 29, 2008, Young was inducted into the WWE Hall of Fame.

In 2017, an all-female professional wrestling tournament was introduced by WWE and was named Mae Young Classic as a tribute to her memory. Its purpose was to showcase the new female wrestlers that had signed with the company and were in development, as well as independent circuit veterans from around the world. The winner received a contract with WWE and a trophy for their achievement. After the second tournament in 2018, the tournament was discontinued.

== Early life ==
Johnnie Mae Young was born in Sand Springs, Oklahoma, on March 12, 1923. She was the youngest of eight children (one died at birth). Her mother Lilly Mae Young was a single mother (her partner left to find work and never returned) living during the Great Depression. Young's oldest sister Inie was severely disabled by whooping cough at a very young age. Young was an amateur wrestler on her high school's boys' wrestling team at the age of fifteen. Her brothers Fred, Eugen, Lawarence, and Everett taught her to wrestle and helped her join the team. Young also played softball with Tulsa's national championship team.

== Professional wrestling career ==
=== Beginnings (1939–1950) ===
While still in high school, Young went to a professional wrestling show and challenged then-champion Mildred Burke when she visited Tulsa to wrestle Gladys Gillem. Because the promoters told her she could not wrestle the champion, she wrestled Gillem in a shoot fight, beating her within seconds. After the fight, promoter Billy Wolfe wanted Young to become a professional wrestler. She left home two years later to wrestle professionally. Young later traveled to Charlotte, North Carolina, where she met and trained with The Fabulous Moolah and also met Ed "Strangler" Lewis who told her "I don't like girl wrestlers, women should be in the kitchen, but after seeing you, you was born to be a wrestler."

There have been conflicting reports as to the year in which Young began her career. Young claimed her first match was August 20, 1939, while WWE said she "started her professional career" this year. However, Young also once said her first match was March 22, 1940. According to Dave Meltzer of The Wrestling Observer, historians have been unable to find any records that she began in 1939 and that her first match was most likely in 1941. Meltzer wrote, "In reality, Young is believed to have competed in seven decades, matching the record held by Lou Thesz. ... You really couldn't call [her] 2010 match anything resembling a pro wrestling match, even giving as much leeway as possible. While she always claimed to have started in 1939, at 16, historians researching have been unable to find any records of her wrestling prior to 1941, when she turned 18 and went on tour with Billy Wolfe's troupe."

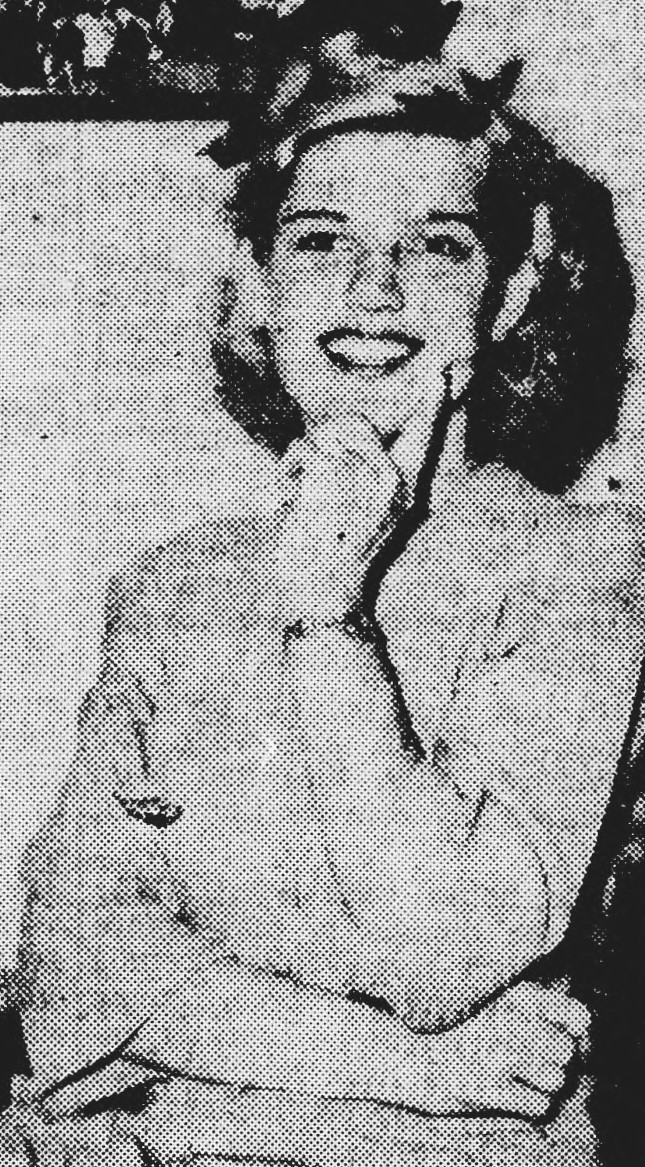
Young in 1943

In 1941, Young, along with Mildred Burke, opened up Canada for female wrestling. In Canada, they worked for Stu Hart. She was wrestling in Memphis, Tennessee, on December 7, 1941, the day that Pearl Harbor was bombed by the Japanese, which led to the United States entering World War II. During the war, Young helped women take advantage of the fact that the men were fighting overseas by expanding their role in the sport.

=== Various wrestling promotions (1950–1970s) ===
She fought under the nicknames of "The Queen" and "The Great Mae Young", but she used her real name for most of her matches. During the 1950s, she wrestled for Mildred Burke's World Women's Wrestling Association (WWWA). In 1954, Young and Burke were some of the first females to tour Japan after the war. In 1951, she became the National Wrestling Alliance's (NWA) first Florida Women's Champion. Five years later in September 1956, she participated in the battle royal to determine the new NWA World Women's Champion after June Byers was stripped of the title, but the championship was won by Young's friend The Fabulous Moolah. In 1968, she became the NWA's first United States Women's Champion. She wrestled for WWWF in two matches in 1969 and 1972. At this point it is unknown when Mae left the wrestling business and retired. In the late 70s, Mae worked in the real estate business in San Leandro California.

As an instructor, her students included Ric "The Equalizer" Drasin and The Fabulous Moolah.

=== Ladies International Wrestling Association (1993–1998) ===
In 1993, Young would come out of retirement and started wrestling again for the first time in over 20 years. She worked for Fabulous Moolah's Ladies International Wrestling Association based in Las Vegas. On June 21, 1996, she teamed with Fabulous Moolah at LIWA Golden Girls Extravaganza event in Las Vegas where they wrestled Liz Chase and Lori Lynn to a no contest. She continued working with LIWA and even teaming with Moolah until 1998. She left the promotion and went to the WWF in 1999.

=== World Wrestling Federation/Entertainment/WWE (1994, 1999–2013) ===
==== Early appearance and arrival (1994, 1999–2001) ====
Before her official recognition by WWE fans, she made a cameo appearance being shown by the camera along with The Fabulous Moolah, Freddie Blassie, Lou Albano, and Nikolai Volkoff in the crowd of the WrestleMania X event on March 20, 1994.

Young made her official debut in the World Wrestling Federation (WWF) on the September 9, 1999, episode of SmackDown!, where she was introduced with The Fabulous Moolah and later was attacked by Jeff Jarrett being put into the figure-four leglock. After this appearance, both Mae and Moolah began appearing regularly on WWF televised shows. Mae made her WWF in-ring debut on the September 27 episode of Raw is War; along with Moolah, she competed in a handicapped evening gown match against WWF Women's Champion Ivory, who stripped Mae from her gown before Moolah picked up the victory. At No Mercy on October 17, Mae managed Moolah, who defeated Ivory for the championship – her last wrestling title before her death in 2007. At Survivor Series on November 14, she and Moolah competed in an eight-woman tag team match along with Debra and Tori against Ivory, Jacqueline, Terri Runnels, and Luna Vachon, with their team coming out victorious.

At the Royal Rumble event on January 23, 2000, Mae Young won the Miss Royal Rumble 2000 swimsuit contest and afterwards flashed her breasts. However, she was actually wearing a prosthesis and did not actually expose herself. At the end of 1999 and through 2000, Mae developed a storyline along with "Sexual Chocolate" Mark Henry where she started dating him, which included a kayfabe pregnancy and attacks by The Dudley Boyz, specifically Bubba Ray Dudley who performed powerbombs on Young through tables twice in consecutive episodes of Raw – the first being in the ring and the second, in which Young was originally reliant on a wheelchair, being off the entryway stage as what has been described as the most notorious powerbomb in WWE history. Mae was 77 years of age at the time, but expressed enthusiasm for the stunt. Her child was eventually delivered and found to be nothing more than a bloody rubber hand. On April 2, Mae accompanied The Kat at WrestleMania 2000 to her match against Terri Runnels; Kat lost the match as Mae was distracted by kissing the guest referee, Val Venis, before attacking Terri and her manager, Moolah.

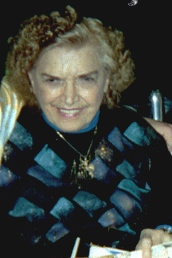
Young in 2001

On December 24, 2001, Young and Moolah appeared backstage on the Christmas Eve edition of Raw, which marked their last appearance before returning in the summer of 2002.

==== Return and sporadic appearances (2002–2007) ====
On the July 29, 2002, episode of Raw, Mae Young returned along with Moolah, to promote her new book: "The Fabulous Moolah: First Goddess of the Squared Circle" before being attacked by 3-Minute Warning on orders of general manager Eric Bischoff. On the September 15, 2003, episode of Raw, she accompanied Moolah at her last wrestling singles match, in which she defeated Victoria before being attacked by Randy Orton and an infuriated Victoria. On June 15 at Bad Blood, Mae appeared during a segment along with Stone Cold Steve Austin and Eric Bischoff where she stripped herself in the ring and shared a passionate kiss with Eric Bischoff and performed a bronco buster on Bischoff before being stunned by Austin.

In 2004, Mae Young was inducted into the Professional Wrestling Hall of Fame and Museum as part of their Lady wrestler category class of that year. On the September 23 episode of SmackDown!, Young teamed with Moolah and defeated Dawn Marie and Torrie Wilson.

On March 23, 2005, Moolah and Mae Young appeared on the Late Night with Conan O'Brien show to promote their 2005 documentary in which they starred about their 1950s heyday along with several other lady wrestlers of their era. On January 8, 2006, at New Year's Revolution, Young re−appeared along with Moolah during a bra & panties gauntlet match where she stripped herself before being attacked by Victoria as she left the ring, which led to both women retaliate and rip off Victoria's shirt. At WrestleMania 22 on April 2, Young appeared along with Moolah during a backstage segment with Snitsky.

At WrestleMania 23 on April 1, 2007, Mae Young appeared during a backstage segment along with several other WWE Superstars and Hall of Famers. On the August 24 episode of SmackDown, Mae Young made a special appearance winning a Divas bikini contest. Mae's last appearance with Moolah before her death came at SummerSlam in August 2007, both appeared during a backstage segment along with Vince McMahon and Raw's general manager, William Regal, two months prior to her friend's death. On the December 10, 2007, episode of Raw's 15th Anniversary, Young was involved in a segment alongside Melina, Sunny, Hornswoggle, Triple H, Shane McMahon, Stephanie McMahon and Vince McMahon.

==== WWE Hall of Fame, retirement and final appearances (2008–2013) ====
On March 29, 2008, Young was inducted into the WWE Hall of Fame as part of the 2008 class. At the ceremony, she was inducted by fellow wrestler and friend, Pat Patterson. In her acceptance speech, she spoke about her wrestling journey, commenting on the following:

I learned to wrestle amateur in Sand Springs so I never heard of women professional wrestlers but one day I heard in tulsa paper there was going to be a women's world championship match come to town of Oklahoma so I immediately got at home with my brother and I shout hey let's you and I go over cause I am going to challenge that champion named Mildred Burke, so I went and there was a promoter (Billy Wolfe) at that time and I told him I want to challenge the world's champion Mildred Burke, he said you can't do that cause you never wrestle a wrestling match, I said yeah but I beat her, I can beat her so the only one who was Burke's adversary at the time, he broke over that there was only two other girl wrestlers in the whole world that was Gladys Gillem and a girl with the name of Elvira Snodgrass so I asked the wrestling coach in Sand Springs and I said I want to try out to be a professional wrestler so it brought Kill'em Guillem over and he put me in one corner Gladys in another so he snailed the bell and I run over her taking her down like a bull and beat her in just seconds, then Billy put me against Elvira Snodgrass and I also beat her in seconds, so then Billy says to me well he says I think I may make a girl wrestler of you.

The next night at WrestleMania XXIV, she appeared when she was introduced as part of the 2008 Hall of Fame class. On the 800th episode of Raw on November 3, Mae Young competed in a 16-Diva tag match, where she was pinned by Beth Phoenix.

At WrestleMania XXV on April 5, 2009, Mae Young appeared as the special guest time keeper for the 25-Diva battle royal, which was won by Santina Marella.

On the November 15, 2010, "Old School" edition of Raw, Young appeared alongside several WWE legends. Later that night, she was involved in a segment with LayCool, where the latter insulted her, resulting in a Falls Count Anywhere handicap match against LayCool, thus becoming the first person to wrestle over the age of 80, the first person to wrestle in nine different decades and her final stipulated wrestling match.

At WrestleMania XXVII on April 3, 2011, Mae appeared backstage during a segment along with The Rock and Eve Torres. During the May 2 episode of Raw, Vickie Guerrero and Dolph Ziggler mockingly presented Mae as a "birthday gift" to The Rock, who responded by kissing Young.

Mae Young appeared on SmackDown: Blast from the Past (April 10, 2012), kissing The Great Khali. and Raw 1000 (July 23, 2012), during which she was escorted by a man dressed in a giant hand costume, claiming to be her son. On September 24 episode of Raw, Mae appeared in one of Kane and Daniel Bryan's "Anger Management" skits. On the December 31 episode of Raw, Mae Young was warming up for her match with then-Divas Champion Eve Torres and began experiencing stomach cramps as it was later determined that she was once again pregnant and gave birth to "Baby New Year", played by Hornswoggle.

In her last on-screen appearance on the March 4, 2013, episode of Old School Raw, Mae Young's 90th birthday celebration was interrupted by CM Punk. Backstage, WWE Chairman Vince McMahon and WWE executive Triple H presented her with a personally monogrammed Divas Championship belt.

== Professional wrestling persona ==
Little is known about Young's character before WWE, but it has been widely speculated that she was the first female wrestler to use a dropkick. She is remembered in WWE for her comedic performances. Among her finishing and signature moves included the elbow drop and the bronco buster, in which she used to perform the famous D-Generation X crotch chop taunt. Young is also remembered for taking bumps, one of her most famous spots was being powerbombed through a table off the wrestling arena stage by Bubba Ray Dudley at the age of 77. Another famous bump of hers was when she was attacked along with The Fabulous Moolah by 3-Minute Warning, where she was scoop slammed and diving splashed by Rosey and Jamal at the age of 79.

== Other media ==
=== Video games ===
Young appeared in one WWE video game, that being WWF No Mercy as an unlockable character, and was also featured on the mobile games for iOS and Android, WWE SuperCard and WWE Champions.

=== Toys ===
In 2007, Mae Young appeared on Jakks Pacific WWE Classic Superstars Series 18. On September 12, 2017, WWE unveiled an exclusive fashion doll done by toy brand Mattel of Mae Young.

In November 2020, a Mae Young action figure was included in the Mattel WWE Elite 81 series as a rare exclusive collector's one.

=== Film ===
Young is portrayed by Francesca Eastwood in the 2024 movie Queen of the Ring.

== Personal life ==
In 1991, Young quit the wrestling business and moved to California to become a Christian evangelist and take care of her mother, who was sick. She later renounced her evangelist lifestyle. In 1991, she moved in with The Fabulous Moolah and midget wrestler Katie Glass at a house in Columbia, South Carolina, an arrangement which lasted until Moolah's death in November 2007.

== Death ==
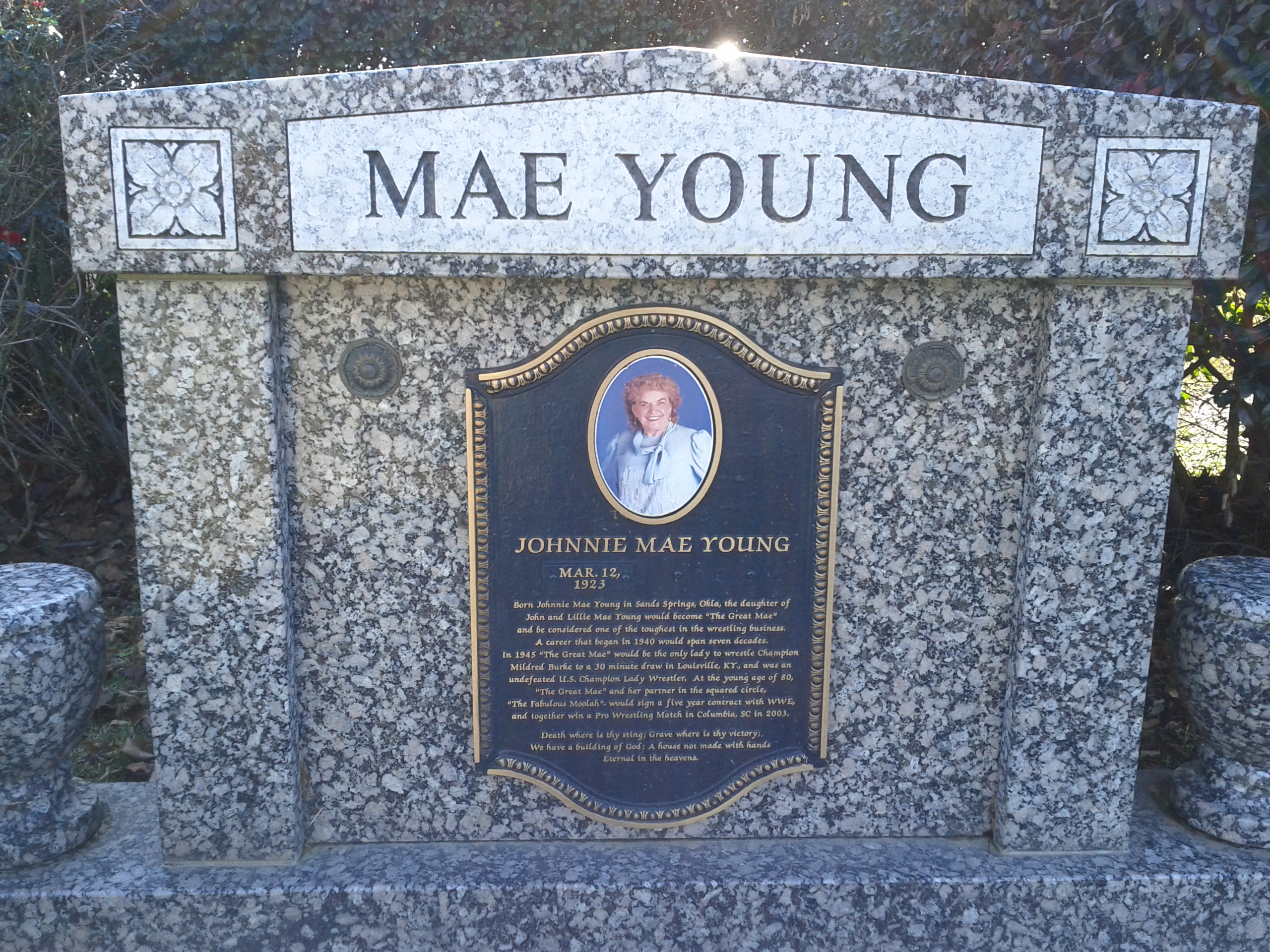
Young's crypt located at Greenlawn Memorial Park in Columbia, South Carolina. It was photographed in 2012, two years before her death

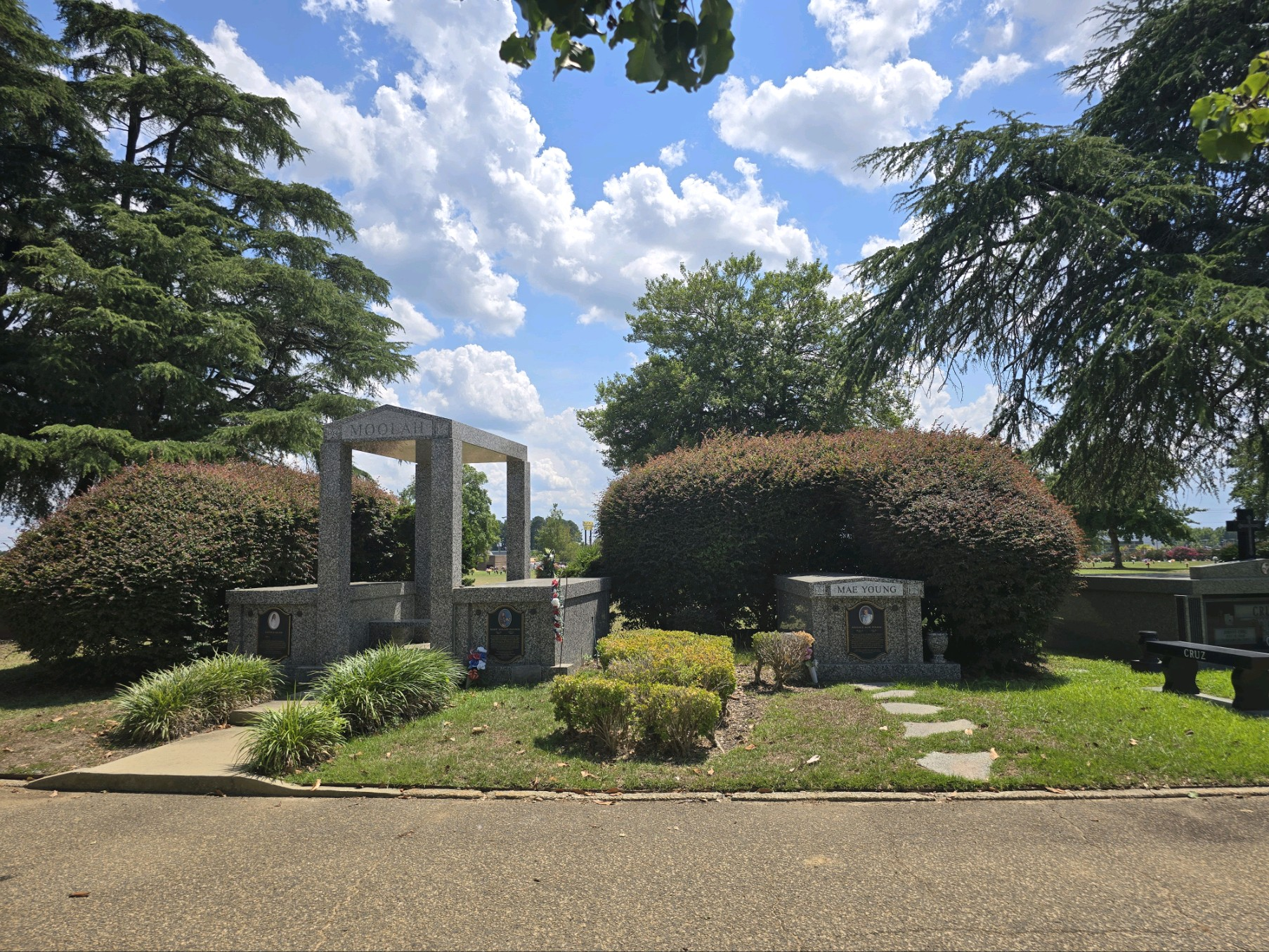
Young marker and the nearby Moolah crypt

On December 31, 2013, it was reported that Young had been hospitalized. The Charleston Post & Courier erroneously reported that she had died on January 9, 2014. Young's death was announced by WWE on the morning of January 14 after having died at her home in Columbia, South Carolina, at the age of 90. Young was entombed at Greenlawn Memorial Park in Columbia, South Carolina, next to the grave plot of her longtime friend The Fabulous Moolah and the latter's protegé Katie Glass.

== Legacy ==
Mae Young is a highly respected figure and one of the pioneers in wrestling industry. She is overall a three-time champion. Her career spanned nine decades, a career that spanned longer than any wrestler in the wrestling business. Young and Mildred Burke were the first women to wrestle in Canada. Her last match broke history when she was regarded as the oldest wrestler to ever have a match at the age of 87. Some of her notable trainees were WWE Hall of Famers The Fabulous Moolah and June Byers. On December 7, 1941, Mae was wrestling in Memphis, Tennessee, the day Pearl Harbor was bombed and the United States entered World War II. WWE Hall of Famer Pat Patterson said: “There's been only one Mae Young, and there will be only one ever.” Wrestling legend Dutch Mantell describe Mae Young as the greatest woman wrestler ever.

She is often recognized by wrestling historians, journalists and colleagues as one of the toughest female wrestlers ever for her willingness to take hard bumps from the male wrestlers. Vince McMahon stated: “There will never be another Mae Young. Her longevity in sports entertainment may never be matched, and I will forever be grateful for all of her contributions to the industry.” WWE Hall of Famer The Fabulous Moolah stated: “Mae Young, she's tough. She taught me a lot.” In 2008, WWE Hall of Famer Jim Ross said: “When it comes to who was the toughest woman, there are no debates. Johnnie Mae Young is universally considered to be the baddest of the bad when it comes to women's wrestling.” Pro wrestling legend “Classy” Freddie Blassie said that: “Mae could kick the hell out of 67% of the men.”

In the book Sisterhood of The Squared Circle by Pat Laprade and Dan Murphy, wrestling journalist Dave Meltzer stated, "There is little doubt she was among the toughest of any of the women wrestlers who were in the so-called golden age in the ’40s and early ’50s." After taking hard bumps from the Dudley Boyz, they describe Mae as: “The toughest man we had ever been in the ring with”. For her longevity, impact and contributions to the industry, she was inducted into the Professional Wrestling Hall of Fame and Museum in 2004 and later into the WWE Hall of Fame in 2008.

== Posthumous honors ==
On January 14, 2014, the exact day of Mae's death, WWE pay tribute to her with a posthumous video which included highlights of her career, and another, six days later, on January 20. On January 16, Total Nonstop Action Wrestling dedicated their live Genesis episode of Impact Wrestling to the memory of Young. On January 17, SmackDown was also dedicated to her memory. Two weeks later, Shine 16 dedicated to her a ten-bell salute.

On March 20, 2017, WWE honored Young during their Women's History Month, a video was released where she was credited as the women pioneer of professional wrestling. WWE praised for her contributions to the wrestling business by Stephanie McMahon, the late Fabulous Moolah, Ivory, Beth Phoenix and Pat Patterson. On July 30, multiple superstars from the Mae Young Classic recognized and honored Mae's legacy and life, among them Lita, Jim Ross, Lacey Evans, Mercedes Martinez, Bianca Belair, Marti Belle and Vanessa Borne.

=== Mae Young Classic ===
On April 1, 2017, WWE announced that a women's tournament would be taking place in the summer of 2017 at a press conference during the WrestleMania 33 weekend and that there were going to be a total of 32 wrestlers competing.

The tournament was named after Young as an honor to her and it was exclusively for women from both NXT and the independent circuit, it took place on July 13 and 14, 2017, which aired on the WWE Network on August 28 (round 1) and September 4 (round 2, quarterfinals, and semifinals), and the final match aired live on September 12, also on the WWE Network. The finalists of the inaugural tournament were Shayna Baszler and Kairi Sane, with the winner being Sane on September 12.

In 2018, the tournament turned annual as it was announced a second event for the Mae Young Classic. The winner of the 2018 tournament was Toni Storm on October 28, and she was crowned at the first ever all women's pay–per–view WWE Evolution.

== Filmography ==
=== Film ===
Year	Title	Role	Notes
2004	Lipstick and Dynamite, Piss and Vinegar: The First Ladies of Wrestling	Herself	Documentary

=== Television ===
Year	Title	Role	Notes
2003	Law & Order: Criminal Intent	Ms. Edwards	Episode: "A Person of Interest"
2004	WWE RAW Diva Search Casting Special	Herself	Guest, television special
2005	Late Night with Conan O'Brien	Herself	Guest

== Championships and accomplishments ==
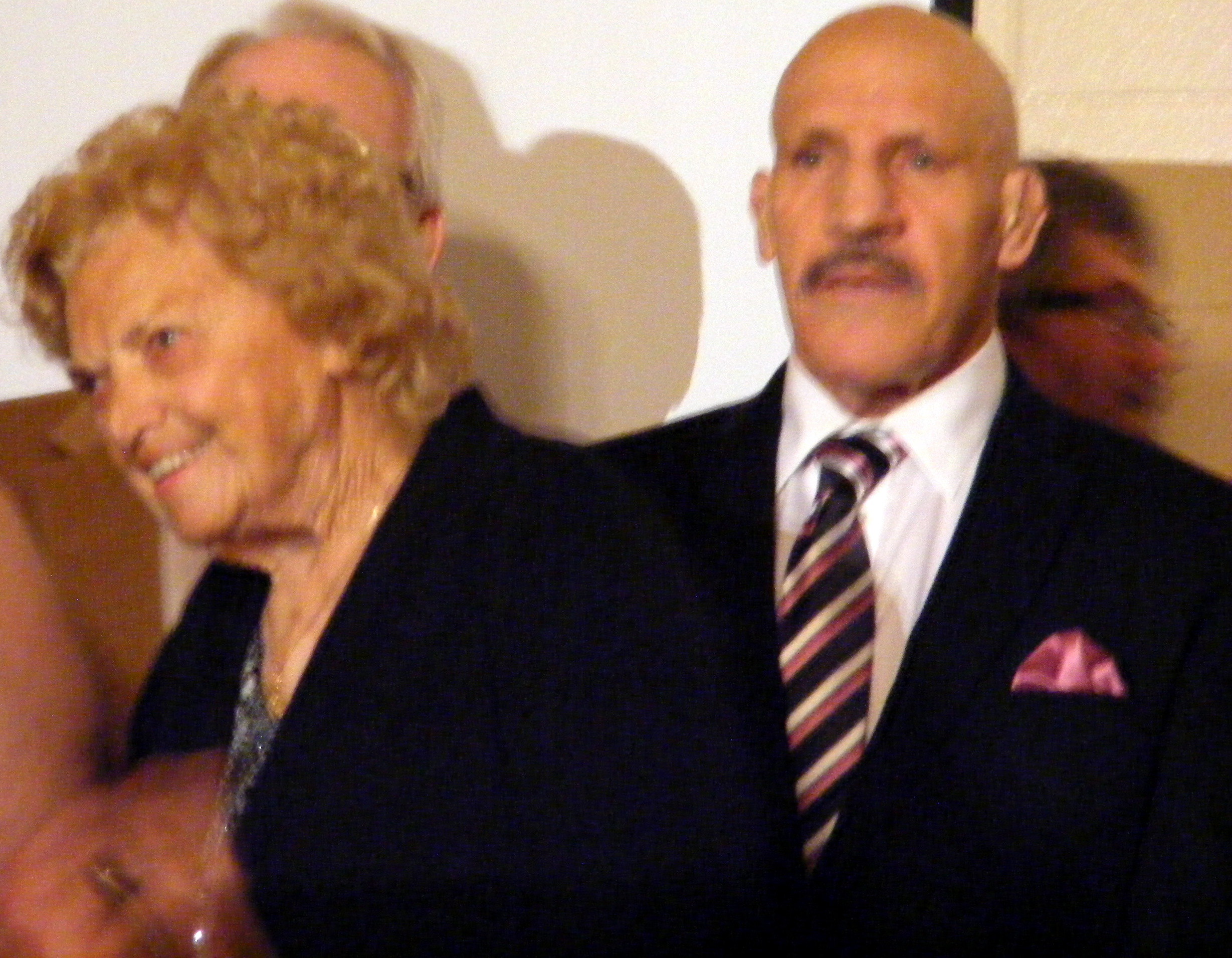
Mae Young with Bruno Sammartino during a Professional Wrestling Hall of Fame event in 2012

- Championship Wrestling from Florida
  - NWA Florida Women's Championship (1 time)
- National Wrestling Alliance
  - NWA United States Women's Championship (1 time)
  - NWA World Women's Tag Team Championship (1 time, inaugural) – with Ella Waldek
- Pro Wrestling Illustrated
  - Ranked No. 241 of the top 500 wrestlers in the PWI 500 in 2006
- Professional Wrestling Hall of Fame
  - Class of 2004
- World Wrestling Federation/World Wrestling Entertainment/WWE
  - Miss Royal Rumble (1 time)
  - Slammy Award (1 time)
    - Knucklehead Moment of the Year (2010) Defeating LayCool at Old School Raw
  - WWE Hall of Fame (Class of 2008)
- Other titles
  - California Women's Championship (2 times)

== See also ==
- List of oldest surviving professional wrestlers
