= Cora Combs =

American actress and professional wrestler (1927–2015)

Personal information
- Born: Beulah Mae Combs; March 17, 1927 Hazard, Kentucky, U.S.
- Died: June 21, 2015 (aged 88) Nashville, Tennessee, U.S.
- Spouses: Earl Evans Andrews, Chester Joseph Szostecki
- Children: Deborah "Debbie" Ann Szostecki, Charles David Szostecki

Professional wrestling career
- Ring name(s): Cora Combs; Lady Satan; Beulah Szostecki
- Billed height: 5 ft 5 in (165 cm)
- Billed weight: 138 lb (63 kg)
- Trained by: Billy Wolfe
- Debut: 1945
- Retired: 1985

Beulah Mae Combs (March 17, 1927 – June 21, 2015), better known by her ring name as Cora Combs, was an American professional wrestler. She was the last survivor of the Billy Wolfe troupe. She mainly wrestled in Indianapolis.

== Professional wrestling career ==
Combs was born on March 17, 1927, in Hazard, Kentucky. Before she was a professional wrestler, Combs was a country music singer. In 1949, she attended a pro wrestling show headlined by Mildred Burke, then the biggest star in women's pro wrestling. Nick Gulas presented her to pro wrestler Billy Wolfe, who trained her.

Combs also wrestled her own daughter, Debbie Combs, under a mask as Lady Satan.

In 2007, Combs was inducted in the Pro Wrestling Hall of Fame.

== Personal life and death ==
Combs had a daughter, Deborah Ann Szostecki (Debbie Combs), who also was a professional wrestler.

Combs died on June 21, 2015, in Nashville at the age of 88. She had pneumonia in the week preceding her death.

== Championships and accomplishments ==
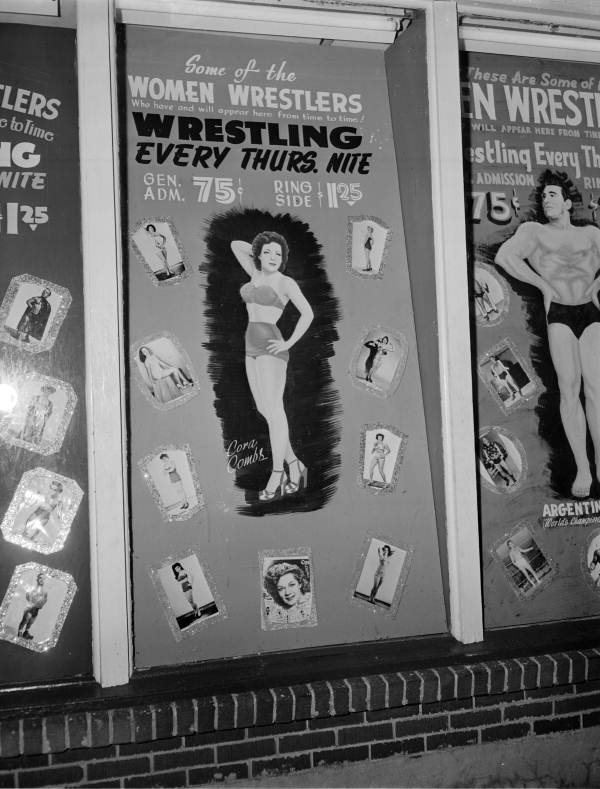
A Jacksonville, Florida poster advertises Cora Combs

- National Wrestling Alliance
  - NWA United States Women's Championship (5 times)
  - NWA Southern Women's Championship (Florida version) (2 times)
- Professional Wrestling Hall of Fame
  - Class of 2007
- WWE
  - WWE Hall of Fame (Class of 2018)

== See also ==
- List of oldest surviving professional wrestlers
