= Gladys Gillem =

American professional wrestler and businesswoman

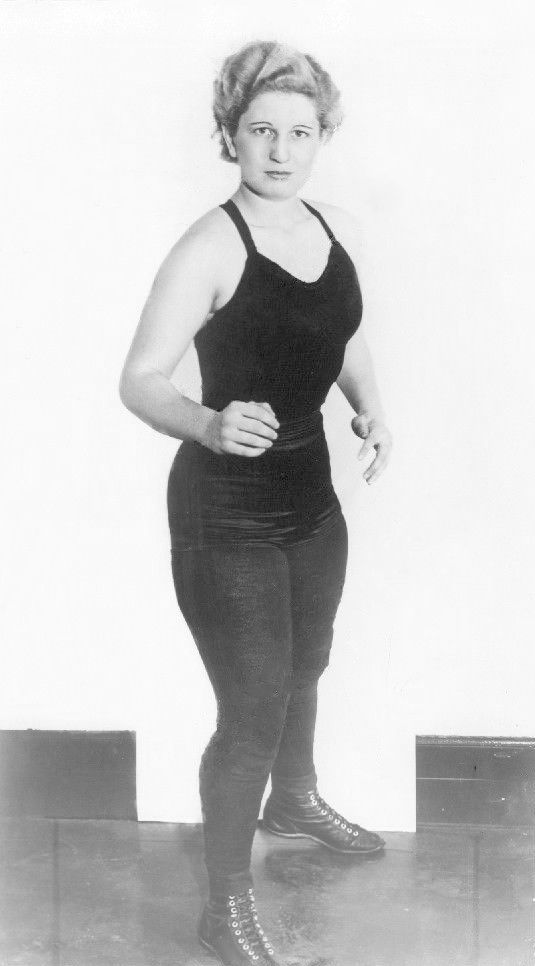
- Gillem in 1942

Personal information
- Born: Gladys Gillem Wall; January 6, 1920 Birmingham, Alabama, U.S.
- Died: August 12, 2009 (aged 89) Pensacola, Florida, U.S.

Professional wrestling career
- Ring name: Gladys Gillem
- Trained by: Wilma Gordon
- Debut: 1942
- Retired: 1962

Gladys Gillem Wall (January 6, 1920 – August 12, 2009), also known as Gladys "Killem" Gillem or Gladys "Kill 'Em" Gillem, was an American professional wrestler.

== Professional wrestling career ==
Gillem was inspired to begin a career as a professional wrestling after seeing Mildred Burke wrestle. She was trained in Tennessee with Wilma Gordon, and she began wrestling in carnival shows. Besides wrestling men and women, Gillem wrestled bears and alligators as part of her act. Gillem eventually found work touring with promoter Billy Wolfe's, the husband of Mildred Burke, troop of women wrestlers in 1942. She was often an opponent of Burke's, wrestling her for the World Women's Championship. She acted in this capacity until her retirement in 1962. During her time with the promotion, she developed a sexual relationship with Wolfe.

During one professional wrestling match, one of Gillem's eyes was knocked out of the socket. Also, she developed a cauliflower like sore on the back of her head due to taking bumps in the ring. Gillem, however, gained additional notability when she was one of the focal interviewees for Lipstick and Dynamite, Piss and Vinegar: The First Ladies of Wrestling, a documentary about the early days of women's wrestling in North America.

== Personal life ==
She was born in Birmingham, Alabama to Fred and Clara Gillem. In high school, Gillem won the Alabama State softball championship with her team. After her father died when she was 19, Gillem took care of her mother, who was an invalid. After leaving wrestling, she rode horses and worked as a trapeze artist. Gillem then became a lion tamer and wrestled alligators.

She met her husband John Wall while working for the Bailey Brothers' circus. The couple had three children together: Kathleen Ann, John, and Claire Fredrica. Her husband was killed while working as a Broadway stagehand in New York when a 500-pound box fell on his head. After his death, Gillem ran her mother's boarding house. In 1973, she began running the Birmingham motel in Pensacola.

== Death ==
Gillem underwent heart bypass surgery in 2003. On August 12, 2009, she died of Alzheimer's disease at her home in Pensacola, Florida.
