= Boyd, Kentucky =

Unincorporated community in Kentucky, United States

Coordinates: 38°33′02″N 84°23′39″W

Boyd is an unincorporated community in Harrison County, Kentucky, in the United States.

== History ==
A post office called Boyd's Station was established in 1854. It was renamed Boyd in 1880, and remained in operation until it was discontinued in 1957. The community was named for Andrew Boyd, an early settler.
