= Ella Waldek =

American professional wrestler (1929–2013)

Personal information
- Born: Elsie Schevchenko; December 2, 1929 Custer, Washington, U.S.
- Died: April 17, 2013 (aged 83)

Professional wrestling career
- Billed height: 5"5
- Billed weight: 137 lb (62 kg)
- Trained by: The Fabulous Moolah
- Debut: 1951
- Retired: 1972

Elsie Schevchenko (December 2, 1929 – April 17, 2013), better known as Ella Waldek (Mecouch), was an American professional wrestler. She was one of the subjects of the 2005 documentary film Lipstick & Dynamite: The First Ladies of Wrestling.

== Professional wrestling career ==
Ella Waldek was born as Elsie Schevchenko in Custer, Washington, daughter of a Ukrainian father and German mother (divorced when their daughter was three) who were farm labourers and lived in a converted barn, and grew up as a self-described "farm girl". Originally a roller derby performer, Waldek's professional wrestling career began in 1952 after a male friend took her to a professional wrestling event. "I didn’t even know there was such a thing," she claimed years later. She was trained by The Fabulous Moolah.

Despite her limited knowledge of professional wrestling at the time, Waldek began a career in Chicago, Illinois. She adopted the name "Ella Waldek" because, in her words, "who could stand in a ring and autograph an eleven letter last name?" Waldek earned the nickname "The Policeman" and also worked under the names "Jackie Lee" and "Charming Carmen". She adopted the short arm scissor lift as one her signature maneuvers. Over the course of her career, Waldek worked matches with other female wrestlers, including Mae Young.

Janet Wolfe died after a body slam she had received from Waldek during a tag team match, though she was not injured by the move. Wolfe rolled out of the ring and collapsed at ringside. Waldek called for the timekeeper to assist her and get her away from the ring. Though Wolfe's death was eventually ruled to be an accident, police initially arrested Waldek and the other participants in the match—Mae Young and Eva Lee. The police reportedly considered charging the three with manslaughter, but all three women were eventually released. As a result of the incident, people attended wrestling events to see Waldek, who had to endure crowd chants of "murderer" directed at her.

Over the course of her wrestling career, Waldek held several titles including the NWA Florida Women's Championship, the NWA World Women's Tag Team Championship with Mae Young and two reigns with the NWA Southern Women's Championship, Florida version.

== Post-wrestling career ==
After almost twenty years of wrestling, Waldek ended her career in 1971. She then became a private investigator and subsequently founded her own security firm, before taking up gardening part-time. Her professional career had apparently taken its toll though, as she had been rendered unable to have children due to a kick she had taken to the solar plexus.

Waldek recounted her experiences as a professional wrestler for the documentary film Lipstick & Dynamite, reuniting with some of her fellow female wrestlers in the process. Through her involvement in the film, Waldek found out that singer-songwriter Neko Case, who had been working on music for the film, is her great-niece.

== Championships and accomplishments ==
- Championship Wrestling from Florida
  - NWA Florida Women's Championship (1 time)
  - NWA Southern Women's Championship (Florida version) (6 times)
- National Wrestling Alliance
  - NWA World Women's Tag Team Championship (1 time, inaugural) – with Mae Young
