= Tampa Sportatorium =

Professional wrestling studio in Florida, US

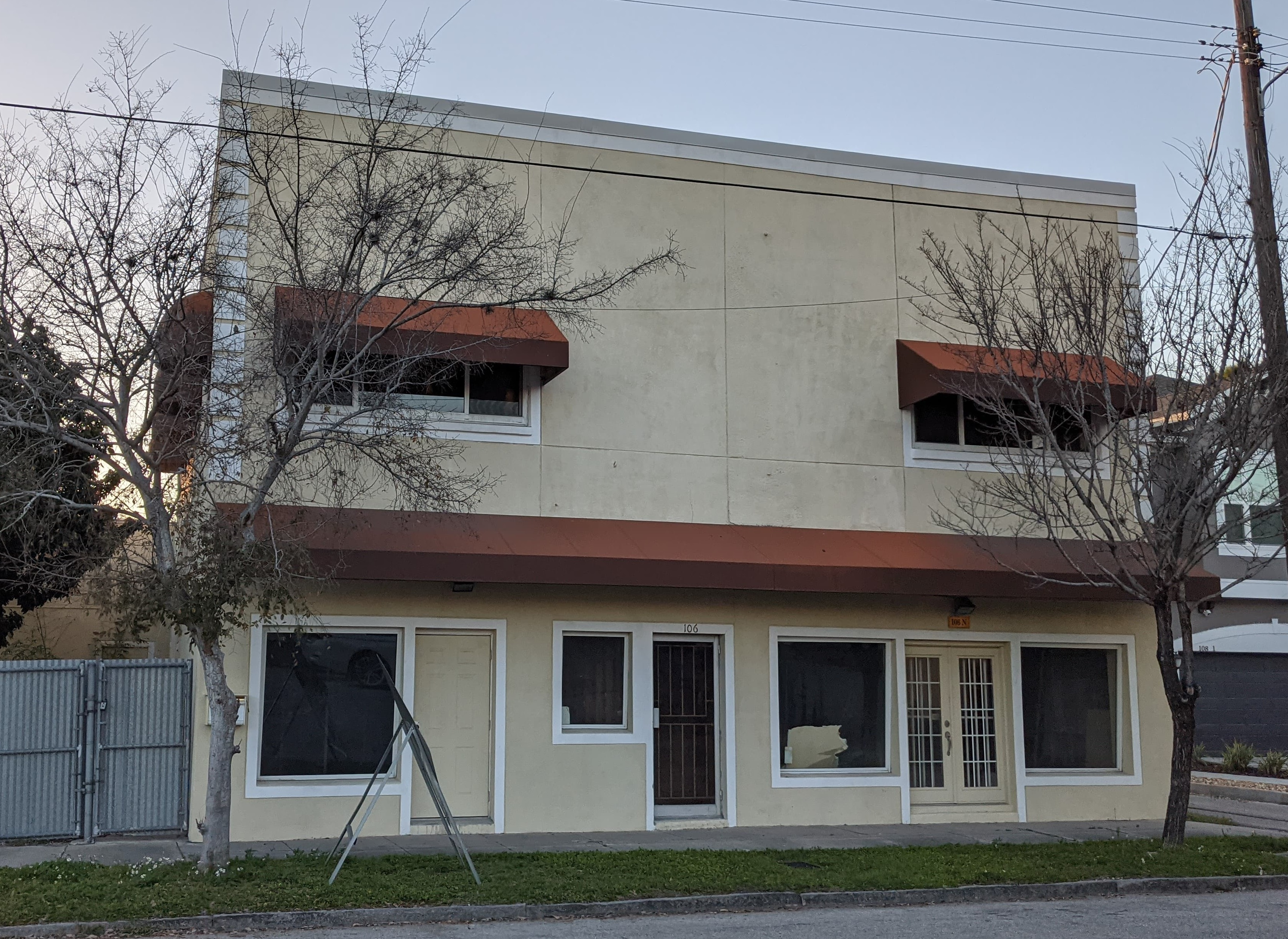
The building once known as the Tampa Sportatorium in 2020.

The Tampa Sportatorium was a professional wrestling studio used by Championship Wrestling from Florida.

Located at 106 N Albany Ave near downtown Tampa, Florida, the 7,500-square-foot stucco building was used for television tapings at 11am on Thursdays, which would air on the following Sundays. The promotion began using the studio for events in 1961 and purchased the building four years later. Tampa native Hulk Hogan attended shows at the Sportatorium as a teenager and recalled that the studio could not fit more than 50 people in it and that it was not air conditioned despite Florida's often warm, subtropical, and humid climate. To make the room seem bigger to the television audience, the walls were painted black. Dory Funk Jr. praised the content to come out of the building, stating: "The Sportatorium was small, but the television it produced was so good."

The upstairs of the building was used as an office by company executives Eddie and Mike Graham and Jim Barnett. Championship Wrestling from Florida closed in 1987 and the Graham family sold the building a few years later. A textile factory occupied the building for many years, until a foreclosure saw it go on auction in 2016. In 2020, it was purchased by a Miami-based development group. It was reported in 2024 that the building was at risk of being demolished after the Tampa City Council voted to rezone the area for new residences and commercial space.
