= NWA Southern Women's Championship (Florida version) =

Professional wrestling women's championship

Details
- Promotion: Championship Wrestling from Florida
- Date established: 1948
- Date retired: 1972
Statistics
- First champion: Bobbie LaRue
- Final champion: Bonnie Watson
- Most reigns: Ella Wladek (6 reigns)

The NWA Southern Women's Championship (Florida version) was a National Wrestling Alliance's women's professional wrestling championship, It was created in 1948 and it was also a part of Championship Wrestling from Florida, the championship retired in 1972.

== Title history ==
Key
| No. | Overall reign number |
| Reign | Reign number for the specific champion |
| Days | Number of days held |

| No. | Champion | Championship change | | | Reign statistics | | Notes | Ref. |
| No. | Champion | Date | Event | Location | Reign | Days | Notes | Ref. |
|---|---|---|---|---|---|---|---|---|
| 1 | Bobbie LaRue | May 2, 1948 (NLT) | CWF Show | Miami, Florida | 1 | (Note: The length of the championship reign is too uncertain to calculate.) | | |
| 2 | Cora Combs | September 1, 1953 (NLT) | CWF Show | N/A | 1 | | Listed as having "Recently won" the championship on September 5, 1953. Title reign undetermined after September 28, 1954 | |
Championship history is unrecorded from September 1, 1953 (NLT) to August 16, 1957 (NLT).
| 3 | Judy Glover | August 16, 1957 (NLT) | CWF Show | N/A | 1 | | | |
| — | Vacated | August 16, 1957 | — | — | — | — | Held up after a match against Millie Stafford ended in a controversial fashion | |
| 4 | Judy Glover | August 23, 1957 | CWF Show | N/A | 2 | 26 | Won the rematch | |
| 5 | Millie Stafford | September 18, 1957 | CWF Show | Tampa, Florida | 1 | 7 | | |
| 6 | Judy Glover | September 25, 1957 | CWF Show | Tampa, Florida | 3 | 3 | | |
| 7 | Ella Waldek | September 28, 1957 | CWF Show | Dade City, Florida | 1 | 56 | | |
| 8 | Judy Glover | November 23, 1957 | CWF Show | Dade City, Florida | 4 | (Note: The length of the reign is uncertain, it lasted between 230 and 319 days.) | Still billed as champion on July 11, 1958 | |
| 9 | Ella Waldek | October 8, 1958 (NLT) | CWF Show | N/A | 2 | (Note: The length of the reign is uncertain, it lasted between 67 and 179 days.) | Still billed as champion on December 14, 1958 | |
| 10 | Judy Glover | January 7, 1959 (NLT) | CWF Show | N/A | 5 | (Note: The length of the reign is uncertain, it lasted between 1 and 47 days.) | | |
| 11 | Ella Waldek | January 1959 | CWF Show | N/A | 3 | (Note: The length of the reign is uncertain, it lasted between 60 and 113 days.) | | |
| 12 | Judy Glover | April 1959 | CWF Show | N/A | 6 | (Note: The length of the reign is uncertain, it lasted between 1 and 30 days.) | | |
| — | Vacated | April 1959 | — | — | — | — | Championship vacated for undocumented reasons. | |
| 13 | Bonnie Watson | November 15, 1960 | CWF Show | Lake Worth, Florida | 1 | | Also recognized as NWA Florida Women's Champion. Still billed as champion on February 27, 1961 | |
Championship history is unrecorded from November 15, 1960 to October 2, 1961 (NLT).
| 14 | Cora Combs | October 2, 1961 (NLT) | CWF Show | N/A | 2 | | | |
Championship history is unrecorded from October 2, 1961 (NLT) to January 21, 1962 (NLT).
| 15 | Ella Waldek | January 21, 1962 (NLT) | CWF Show | N/A | 5 | | Listed as former champion on February 3, 1962 | |
Championship history is unrecorded from January 21, 1962 (NLT) to April 1, 1962 (NLT).
| 16 | Ella Waldek | April 1, 1962 (NLT) | CWF Show | N/A | 6 | | | |
| 17 | Bonnie Watson | April 1962 | CWF Show | N/A | 2 | | The title change took place between April 3 and April 15, 1962. Listed as former champion on March 26, 1967 | |
Championship history is unrecorded from April 1962 to May 22, 1968 (NLT).
| 18 | Bonnie Watson | May 22, 1968 (NLT) | CWF Show | N/A | 3 | | Listed as champion on August 5, 1971. Held both Southern and Florida championship on October 1, 1972 | |
| — | Deactivated | After October 1, 1972 | — | — | — | — | Last documented title match took place on this date | |

== See also ==
- Jim Crockett Promotions
- National Wrestling Alliance
- Championship Wrestling from Florida
