= Championship Wrestling from Florida =

American professional wrestling promotion

- Acronym: CWF
- Founded: 1949
- Defunct: 1987
- Headquarters: Tampa, Florida
- Founder: "Cowboy" Clarence P. Luttrall
- Owner(s): Eddie Graham; Hiro Matsuda; Duke Keomuka

Championship Wrestling from Florida (CWF) was the corporate and brand name of the Tampa, Florida, wrestling office existing from 1961, when Eddie Graham first bought into the promotion, until 1987, when it closed down. It is also referred to as Florida Championship Wrestling. When Mike Graham tried a return to promoting, the rights to the name had been acquired by an outside party, forcing him to use another name, Florida Championship Wrestling.

== History ==
=== Founding ===
The original owner and promoter was "Cowboy" Clarence Preston Luttrall, a former journeyman heel wrestler who once fought a widely publicized boxing match, resulting from a wrestling angle, with a forty-something Jack Dempsey. Luttrall opened the office in 1949, and Eddie Graham bought into the promotion in 1961, then took over completely in 1971 due to the declining health of Luttrall.

The office was a member of the National Wrestling Alliance during the entire CWF era, Eddie Graham serving two terms as NWA president, and loosely aligned before that, with other 'world' champions sometimes defending their titles. CWF became a staple in many Southern households in the 1970s and 1980s, with Dusty Rhodes arguably its most noted headliner, his babyface turn beginning May 14, 1974, against former partner Pak Song. The promotion competed against other syndicated shows on Saturday night like The Lawrence Welk Show and Solid Gold for years.

=== Notable stars ===
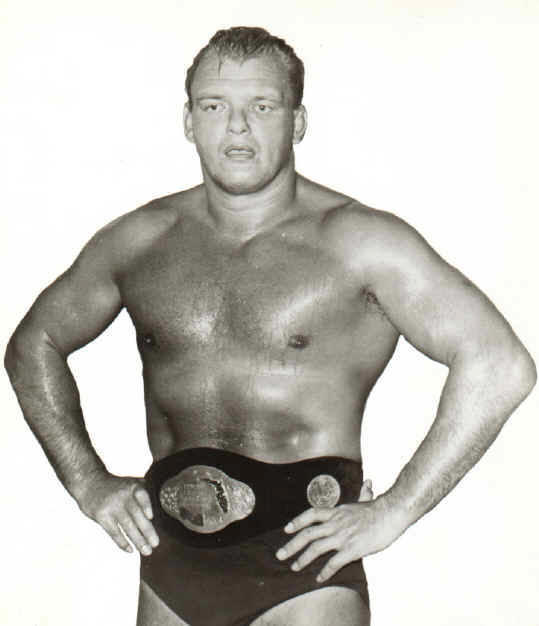
Johnny Valentine with the NWA Florida Heavyweight Championship

The promotion thrived with stars such as NWA champions Lou Thesz and Gene Kiniski, Graham, Bobby Shane, Robert Lee Schoenberger, Don Curtis, Sam Steamboat, The Magnificent Muraco (Don Muraco), the Great Malenko (Larry Simon), Johnny Valentine, Hiro Matsuda, Bob Orton Sr. and later Bob Orton Jr., Joe Scarpa (later known as Chief Jay Strongbow), Wahoo McDaniel, the Funks (Terry and Dory Jr.), the Briscos (Jack and Jerry), Buddy Colt (Ron Read), Dusty Rhodes, Blackjack Mulligan, Bruiser Brody, Kendall Windham, Barry Windham, Mike Rotunda, Lex Luger, Rick Rood (later Rick Rude), Harley Race, André the Giant, Jim Duggan, Butch Reed, Rick Steiner, The Freebirds, Cactus Jack, Scott Hall, Terry Allen (later more famous as Magnum T. A.), Percy Pringle (later more famous as Paul Bearer), Luna Vachon, Jimmy Garvin, Adrian Street, Héctor Guerrero, Chavo Guerrero Sr., Oliver Humperdink, One Man Gang, J. J. Dillon, Gary Hart (wrestler), Bob Roop, Mark Lewin, Dutch Mantel, Mike Graham (Eddie's son), The Sheepherders, Kevin Sullivan – whose cult-like Army of Darkness got tremendous heat from the fans – and, in the words of the promotion's legendary commentator and a star in his own right Gordon Solie, 'a host of others'. Solie's deadpan interviewing style often buoyed the outlandish behavior and actions of Sullivan and his minions, bringing a legitimacy to the on-air segments no matter what depths Sullivan would descend to.

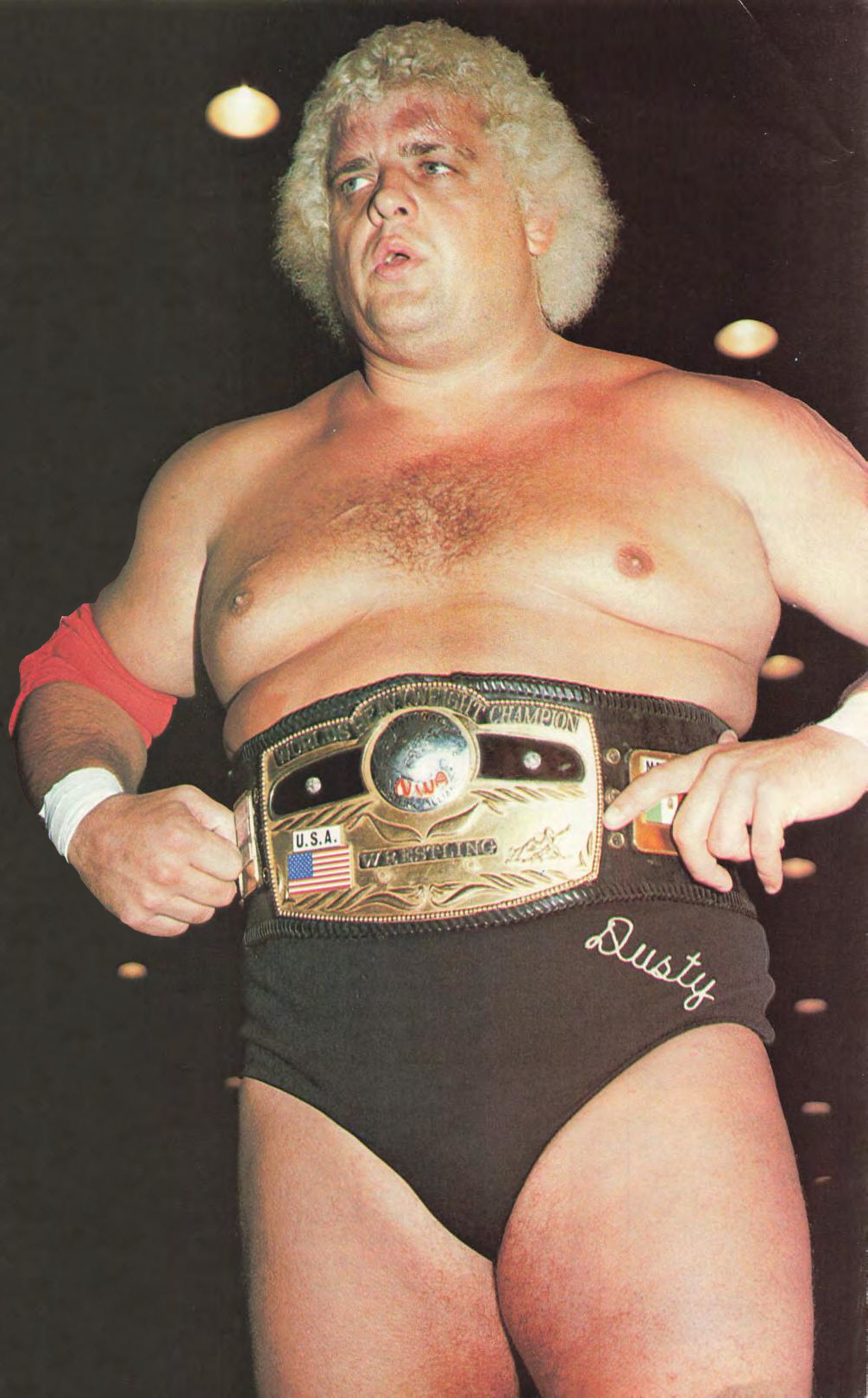
Dusty Rhodes became a top star in the territory

Dusty Rhodes stands out among the noted performers because of the number of rivalries he had on air through most of CWF's broadcasting history. Well known heels, newcomers and babyfaces who turned heel during their tenure with CWF often sought out Rhodes to make their names in the territory. His rivals over the years included Superstar Billy Graham, Ray Stevens, Ernie Ladd, Ivan Koloff, Ox Baker, Ron Bass, Kamala, Abdullah the Butcher, Ric Flair, his old Texas Outlaws partner Dick Murdoch and of course, Kevin Sullivan.

Mike Moore served as a ring announcer.

=== After Eddie Graham's suicide ===
When Eddie Graham died by suicide in January 1985, due to a combination of personal and business problems, responsibility for the office went to Hiro Matsuda and Duke Keomuka, both of whom bought in during the 1960s. The other remaining owners were Mike Graham, Eddie's brother Skip Gossett, Dusty Rhodes and Buddy Colt. The promotion continued losing money and merged with Jim Crockett Promotions in February 1987. Most of the stars had gone to Jim Crockett Promotions or the WWF by that point. CWF continued operating as a JCP subsidiary until its last card on November 14, 1987, in Robarts Arena in Sarasota; in the main event, NWA Western States Heritage champion Barry Windham battled Dory Funk Jr. to a 20-minute time-limit draw.

== Professional Wrestling Federation ==
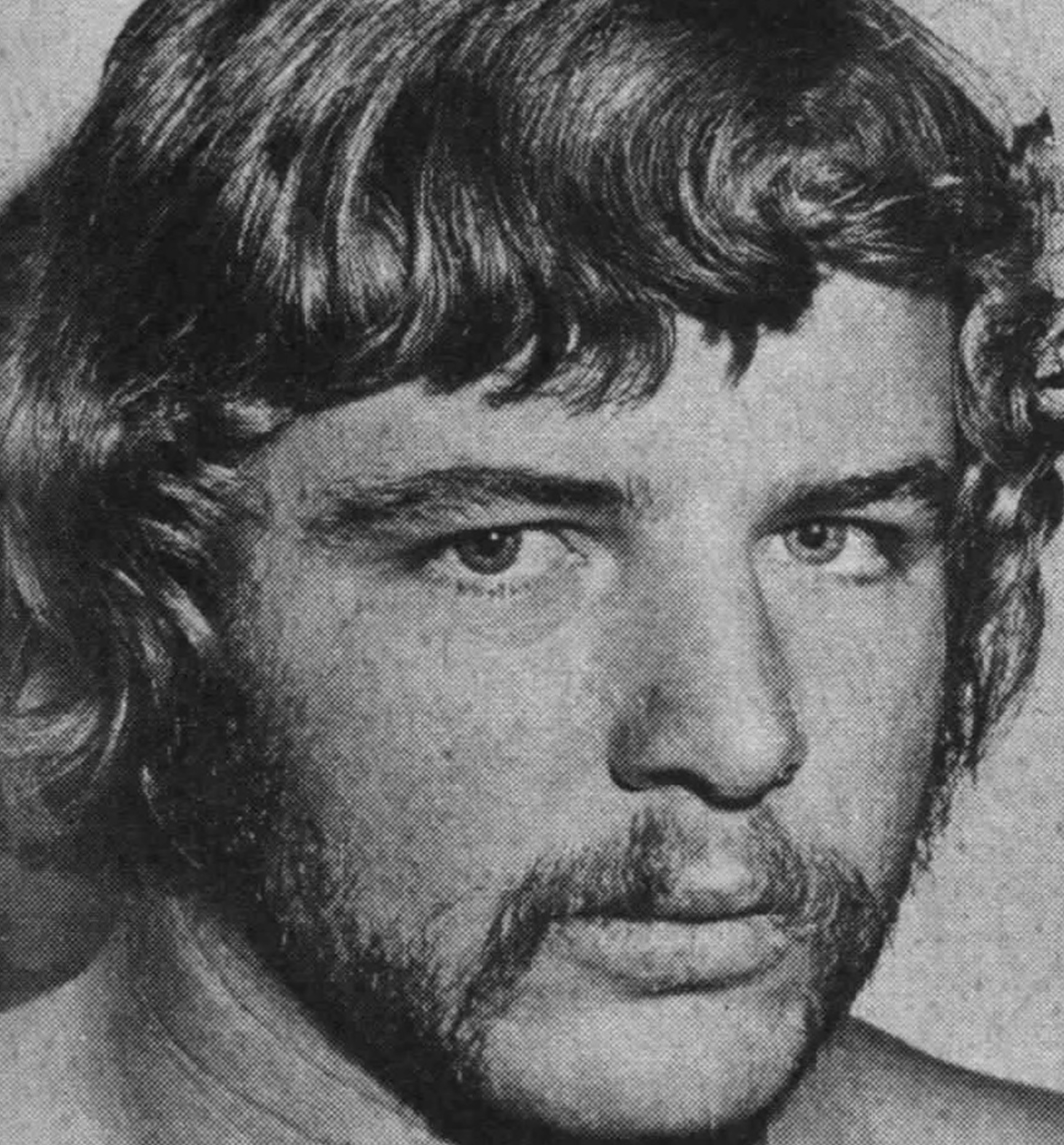
Mike Graham attempted to revive the territory after the death of his father

In late 1988, during the acquisition of Jim Crockett Promotions by Turner Broadcasting that formed World Championship Wrestling (WCW), the duo of Mike Graham and Steve Keirn attempted to revive the dormant CWF territory as a separate promotion. Once Rhodes departed from WCW, they reached out to him, and ultimately partnered to launch the new promotion in February 1989. Rhodes had larger visions for the fledgling regional territory, which included a name change from FCW to the non-regional Professional Wrestling Federation (PWF). The new startup promotion featured a raft of current and future stars, including Terry Funk, Dick Slater, Bam Bam Bigelow, Al Perez, The Nasty Boys, Scott Hall, Dustin Rhodes, Mike Awesome, Dallas Page and The Big Steel Man (who would become Tugboat in the WWF).

Dusty Rhodes made his debut for the company on March 4, 1989, at an event in Titusville, Florida, when he teamed with Steve Keirn to defeat the duo of The Big Steel Man and Dick Slater. A week later at the PWF Homecoming event in Tampa, he pinned Big Steel Man to become the first PWF Heavyweight Champion. Later that spring as the PWF began to grow, Rhodes received a surprise backstage visit from Bobby Heenan, who inquired on the state of the company's business. Shortly thereafter Vince McMahon reached out to Rhodes and made an offer to acquire the PWF as a developmental territory and to bring Rhodes into the WWF. He refused, as his desire was to grow the territory into a national brand that could compete with WCW and the WWF. However the Professional Wrestling Federation's backers did not have a desire to fund the company at a level necessary to enhance the territory further. In May he decided to part ways with the PWF and join the World Wrestling Federation as a wrestler.

Before departing, Rhodes was defeated by The Big Steel Man on May 13, 1989, for the PWF title at an event in Sarasota. His final match with the company was on May 20, where he wrestled Steel Man at an event in Fort Lauderdale. The promotion closed shortly after holding its last show June 29, 1991, in Nassau, Bahamas, which saw Tyree Pride beat Steve Keirn for the PWF Florida Championship.

The PWF Heavyweight Championship belt was later used as a makeshift WCW World Heavyweight Championship belt. This was awarded to Lex Luger at the 1991 Great American Bash and worn by him until a permanent replacement for the Big Gold Belt was ready.

== Television programs and tape library ==
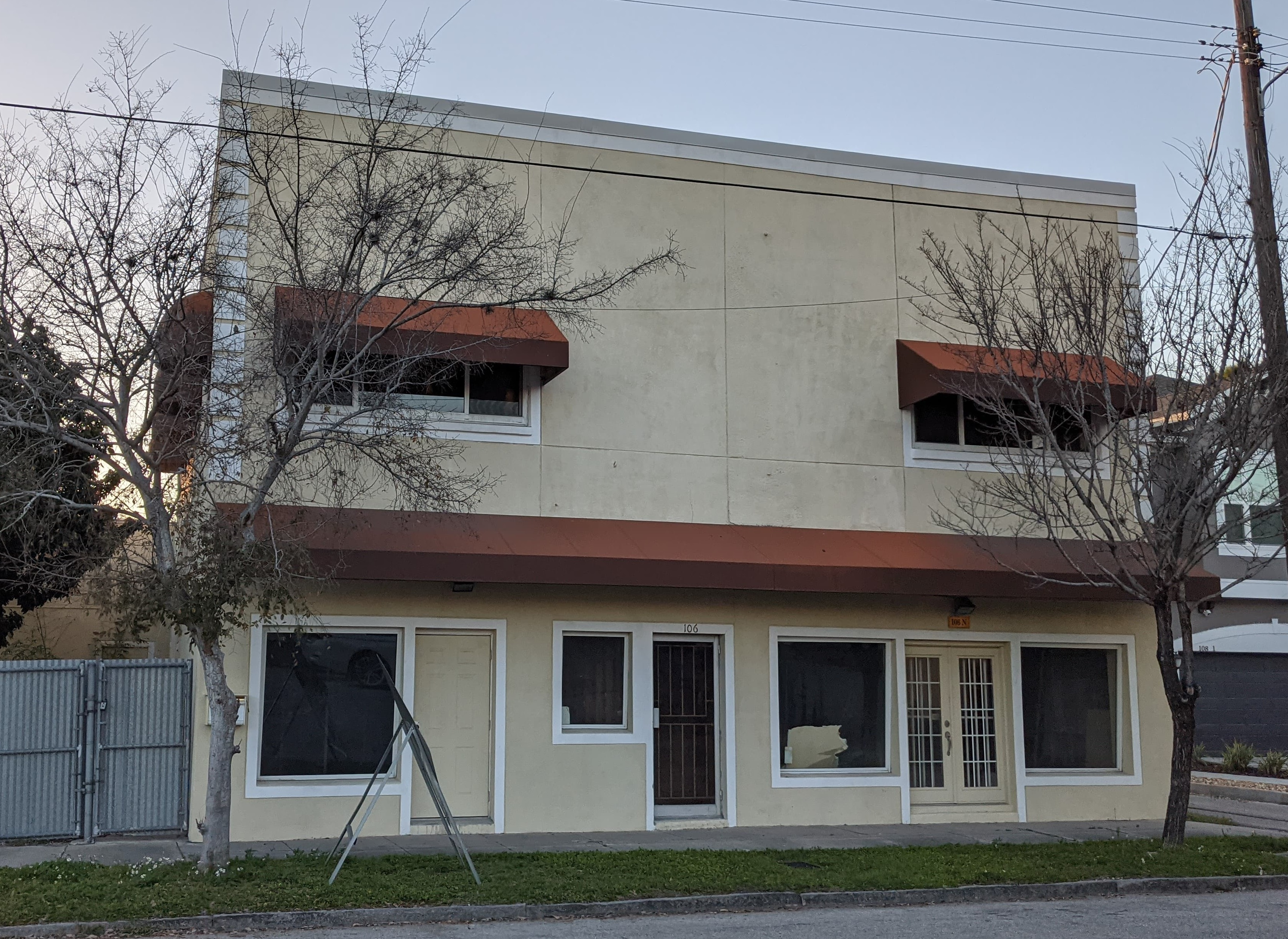
The building once known as the Tampa Sportatorium in 2020

CWF filmed and later taped its weekly TV wrestling show at the Tampa Sportatorium at 106 North Albany Avenue in Tampa, which was in reality a small television studio with seating for a live audience of about 100 people, with the wrestling office and gym in the same building. Arena footage was always also used, and full arena show broadcasts began in the early '80s. CWF Spin-off shows were Championship Wrestling Superstars, Global Wrestling, North Florida Championship Wrestling, United States Class Wrestling, American Championship Wrestling and Southern Professional Wrestling.

In 1960, Gordon Solie became the lead announcer for CWF's Saturday morning television shows, a spot he would occupy for the next quarter-century. In 1980, he hired singer Barbara Clary, who was bilingual to conduct interviews in both English and Spanish. Solie was joined on commentary by Buddy Colt during the program's final years.

On March 2, 2006, the CWF library was purchased by World Wrestling Entertainment (WWE) for the DVD on Dusty Rhodes.

In 2007, WWE revived the promotion as a developmental territory under the name Florida Championship Wrestling (FCW). In 2012, the promotion began operating under the NXT banner, dropping references to FCW. On June 28, 2013, the WWE formally shuttered the Florida Championship Wrestling Arena, moving all equipment and personnel to the WWE Performance Center in Orlando.

== Championships ==
- NWA Brass Knuckles Championship (Florida version)
- NWA Florida Bahamian Championship
- NWA Florida Global Tag Team Championship
- NWA Florida Heavyweight Championship
- NWA Florida Junior Heavyweight Championship
- NWA Florida Television Championship
- NWA Florida Tag Team Championship
- NWA Florida Women's Championship
- NWA Southern Heavyweight Championship (Florida version)
- NWA Southern Tag Team Championship (Florida version)
- NWA Southern Women's Championship (Florida version)
- NWA North American Tag Team Championship (Florida version)
- NWA United States Tag Team Championship (Florida version)
- NWA World Tag Team Championship (Florida version)

== See also ==
- List of National Wrestling Alliance territories
- List of independent wrestling promotions in the United States
